= Mexico in the OTI Festival 1989 =

- OTI Festival 1989
- Participating broadcaster: Televisa
- Country: Mexico
- Selection process: National OTI Festival
- Selection date: 8 October 1989

Competing entry
- Song: "Una canción no es suficiente"
- Artist: Analí
- Songwriter: Jesús Monárrez

Placement
- Final result: 1st

Participation chronology
◄1988 •	1989	• 1990►

Mexico was represented at the OTI Festival 1989 with the song "Una canción no es suficiente", written by Jesús Monárrez, and performed by Analí. The Mexican participating broadcaster, Televisa, selected its entry through a national televised competition with several phases. The song, that was performed in position 14, placed first out of 22 competing entries, winning the festival. This was the fourth entry from Mexico that won the OTI Festival, after winning in 1973, in 1975, and in 1985.

== National stage ==
Televisa held a national competition with four televised qualifying rounds, a playoff, a semi-final, and a final to select its entry for the 18th edition of the OTI Festival. This eighteenth edition of the National OTI Festival featured forty songs in the qualifying rounds, sixteen in the semi-final, and eight in the final. The top-three entries were awarded. In addition to the general competition, awards were also given for Best Male Performer, and Best Female Performer.

The shows were held at Teatro de la Ciudad in Mexico City, were presented by Raúl Velasco, and broadcast on Canal 2. The musical director was Chucho Ferrrer, who conducted the orchestra when required.

Competing entries on the National OTI Festival – Mexico 1989
Song	Artist	Songwriter(s)	Conductor
"Aura"	Carlos Lara	Carlos Lara	
"Blanca María"	Alberto Cardielli	Blanca Zurita	
"Carta"	Magdalena Zárate	Amparo Rubín	
"¿Cómo fue?"	Yoshio	Yoshio	
"Cuesta arriba"	Antonio	Jorge Javier Martínez	
"Del otro lado del mundo"	Gitano	Jorge Javier Martínez	
"Del suelo al cielo"	Byanca	José T. Martínez; Alfredo Gil	
"Después de ti, después de mí"	Alejandro Filio	Alejandro Filio	Luigi Lazareno
"Es amor"	Johnny Laboriel	José A. Ceballos; Felipe de la Cruz	
"Es el amor"	Héctor Suárez	Benny Ibarra; Héctor Suárez	
"Frida"	Carmín	Carmín	
"Juntos"	Ulises	Carlos Lara	
"Hoy he vuelto a este lugar"	Arturo Sayeg	Arturo Sayeg	Pedro Alberto Cárdenas
"Loco"	José Roberto	José Roberto	Luigi Lazareno
"Más que sueños"	Ópera Prima	Juan Carlos Pastrana; Ramiro Pastrana	
"Mejor que él"	Héctor Meneses	Héctor Meneses	
"Nadie se va del todo"	Sergio Esquivel	Sergio Esquivel	
"No me hace falta más"	Jade	Pedro Alberto Cárdenas; Francisco Curiel	
"Nunca será tarde"	José María Napoleón	José María Napoleón	Luigi Lazareno
"Para morir así"	Imelda Miller	Gabriel Villaseñor de Anda	
"Pecador y creyente"	Manolo Muñoz	José Roberto	
"Por un momento"	Roberto Jordán	Felipe Gil	Chucho Ferrer
"Pretendimos a tiempo"	Lolita Cortés	Sergio Chávez; Paco Rosas	
"Qué bonito es vivir"	Felipe Gil	Felipe Gil	
"Qué difícil será olvidarte"	Tiempo Nuevo	Carlos María	
"Qué mal te va sin mí"	Sonia Rivas	Sonia Rivas	
"Quédate"	Omar	Omar	
"Señores del jurado, me declaro culpable"	Amparo Rubín	Amparo Rubín	
"Simple y llanamente"	Alejandra Ávalos	Pedro Alberto Cárdenas	
"Taciturno amor"	Pablo Raffi	Mujeres Trabajando; Jorge Luis Meixueiro	
"Te extraño"	Patsy	Omar Hernández	
"Territorios H.S."	Cecilia Toussaint	Cecilia Toussaint	
"Tómame"	Paco Guízar	Alejandro Filio	
"Un rayo de luz"	Dianna	Juan Francisco Rodríguez	
"Una canción no es suficiente"	Analí	Jesús Monárrez	Jesús Medel
"Una última sonrisa"	Media Luna	Juan Carlos Pastrana	Juan Santana
"Y aquí estoy"	Francisco Xavier	Alberto Berganza; Francisco Xavier	
"Y es él"	Coco Levy	Xavier Asali; Coco Levy	Xavier Asali
"Y nada más"	Jesús Monárrez	Jesús Monárrez	
"Y sé que vas a llorar"	Imelda Miller	Carlos María	Homero Patrón

=== Qualifying rounds ===
The four qualifying rounds were held on Saturdays 9, 16, and 23, and 30 September 1989. Each round featured ten entries, of which the three highest-scoring advanced to the semi-final. In each round, after all the competing entries were performed, each of the ten jurors cast one vote for each of their three favorite entries.

The ten jurors were: Rafael Acosta, Álvaro Dávila, (Note: Álvaro Dávila was absent in the third qualifying round.) María Eugenia de Esesarte, Luis G. Basurto, Agustín Jiménez, Leopoldo Meraz, Gustavo Rivera, Sylvia Tapia, Jesús Vázquez, Rubén Zepeda.

Qualifier

Result of the first qualifying round of the National OTI Festival – Mexico 1989
R/O	Song	Artist	Votes	Result
1	"Frida"	Carmín	1	—N/a
2	"Hoy he vuelto a este lugar"	Arturo Sayeg	0	—N/a
3	"Loco"	José Roberto	6	Qualified
4	"Una última sonrisa"	Media Luna	0	—N/a
5	"Después de ti, después de mí"	Alejandro Filio	7	Qualified
6	"Y sé que vas a llorar"	Imelda Miller	0	—N/a
7	"Por un momento"	Roberto Jordán	0	—N/a
8	"Una canción no es suficiente"	Analí	9	Qualified
9	"Y es él"	Coco Levy	3	—N/a
10	"Nunca será tarde"	José María Napoleón	4	—N/a

Detailed vote of the first qualifying round of the National OTI Festival – Mexico 1989
R/O	Song	Rubén Zepeda	Rafael Acosta	Agustín Jiménez	M. Eugenia de Esesarte	Álvaro Dávila	Leopoldo Meraz	Sylvia Tapia	Gustavo Rivera	Jesús Vázquez	Luis G. Basurto	Total
1	"Frida"		1									1
2	"Hoy he vuelto a este lugar"											0
3	"Loco"		1	1				1	1	1	1	6
4	"Una última sonrisa"											0
5	"Después de ti, después de mí"	1			1	1	1	1		1	1	7
6	"Y sé que vas a llorar"											0
7	"Por un momento"											0
8	"Una canción no es suficiente"	1	1	1	1	1	1	1	1	1		9
9	"Y es él"	1			1						1	3
10	"Nunca será tarde"			1		1	1		1			4

Result of the second qualifying round of the National OTI Festival – Mexico 1989
R/O	Song	Artist	Votes	Result
1	"Qué difícil será olvidarte"	Tiempo Nuevo	2	—N/a
2	"Taciturno amor"	Pablo Raffi	10	Qualified
3	"Un rayo de luz"	Dianna	7	Qualified
4	"Es amor"	Johnny Laboriel	1	—N/a
5	"Te extraño"	Patsy	0	—N/a
6	"Juntos"	Ulises	0	—N/a
7	"Carta"	Magdalena Zárate	6	Qualified
8	"Mejor que él"	Héctor Meneses	1	—N/a
9	"No me hace falta más"	Jade	3	—N/a
10	"Para morir así"	Imelda Miller	0	—N/a

Detailed vote of the second qualifying round of the National OTI Festival – Mexico 1989
R/O	Song	Jesús Vázquez	Rafael Acosta	Sylvia Tapia	Álvaro Dávila	Luis G. Basurto	Leopoldo Meraz	Rubén Zepeda	M. Eugenia de Esesarte	Agustín Jiménez	Gustavo Rivera	Total
1	"Qué difícil será olvidarte"							1	1			2
2	"Taciturno amor"	1	1	1	1	1	1	1	1	1	1	10
3	"Un rayo de luz"	1	1	1		1	1			1	1	7
4	"Es amor"		1									1
5	"Te extraño"											0
6	"Juntos"											0
7	"Carta"	1				1	1	1		1	1	6
8	"Mejor que él"				1							1
9	"No me hace falta más"			1	1				1			3
10	"Para morir así"											0

Result of the third qualifying round of the National OTI Festival – Mexico 1989
R/O	Song	Artist	Votes	Result
1	"Más que sueños"	Ópera Prima	0	—N/a
2	"Blanca María"	Alberto Cardielli	0	—N/a
3	"¿Cómo fue?"	Yoshio	6	Qualified
4	"Tómame"	Paco Guízar	2	—N/a
5	"Del suelo al cielo"	Byanca	0	—N/a
6	"Cuesta arriba"	Antonio	6	Qualified
7	"Señores del jurado, me declaro culpable"	Amparo Rubín	0	—N/a
8	"Y nada más"	Jesús Monárrez	5	—N/a
9	"Es el amor"	Héctor Suárez	1	—N/a
10	"Nadie se va del todo"	Sergio Esquivel	7	Qualified

Detailed vote of the third qualifying round of the National OTI Festival – Mexico 1989
R/O	Song	Luis G. Basurto	M. Eugenia de Esesarte	Rubén Zepeda	Gustavo Rivera	Jesús Vázquez	Rafael Acosta	Agustín Jiménez	Sylvia Tapia	Leopoldo Meraz	~~Álvaro Dávila~~	Total
1	"Más que sueños"											0
2	"Blanca María"											0
3	"¿Cómo fue?"	1		1	1			1	1	1		6
4	"Tómame"		1				1					2
5	"Del suelo al cielo"											0
6	"Cuesta arriba"		1	1	1	1		1	1			6
7	"Señores del jurado, me declaro culpable"											0
8	"Y nada más"	1	1			1	1		1			5
9	"Es el amor"									1		1
10	"Nadie se va del todo"	1		1	1	1	1	1		1		7

Result of the fourth qualifying round of the National OTI Festival – Mexico 1989
R/O	Song	Artist	Votes	Result
1	"Qué mal te va sin mí"	Sonia Rivas	0	—N/a
2	"Quédate"	Omar	0	—N/a
3	"Aura"	Carlos Lara	2	—N/a
4	"Del otro lado del mundo"	Gitano	7	Qualified
5	"Qué bonito es vivir"	Felipe Gil	5	Qualified
6	"Simple y llanamente"	Alejandra Ávalos	0	—N/a
7	"Y aquí estoy"	Francisco Xavier	10	Qualified
8	"Pretendimos a tiempo"	Lolita Cortés	0	—N/a
9	"Pecador y creyente"	Manolo Muñoz	1	—N/a
10	"Territorios H.S."	Cecilia Toussaint	5	—N/a

Detailed vote of the fourth qualifying round of the National OTI Festival – Mexico 1989
R/O	Song	Gustavo Rivera	Luis G. Basurto	Álvaro Dávila	Rubén Zepeda	Sylvia Tapia	M. Eugenia de Esesarte	Jesús Vázquez	Leopoldo Meraz	Rafael Acosta	Agustín Jiménez	Total
1	"Qué mal te va sin mí"											0
2	"Quédate"											0
3	"Aura"				1	1						2
4	"Del otro lado del mundo"	1	1			1	1	1	1		1	7
5	"Qué bonito es vivir"	1	1	1					1		1	5
6	"Simple y llanamente"											0
7	"Y aquí estoy"	1	1	1	1	1	1	1	1	1	1	10
8	"Pretendimos a tiempo"											0
9	"Pecador y creyente"									1		1
10	"Territorios H.S."			1	1		1	1		1		5

=== Playoff ===
The playoff was held on Saturday 30 September 1989 following the fourth qualifying round. To select the last four semi-finalists, each of the ten jurors cast one vote for each of their four favorite entries among the twenty-eight not qualified.

Result of the playoff of the National OTI Festival – Mexico 1989
Song	Result
"Aura"	—N/a
"Blanca María"	—N/a
"Del suelo al cielo"	—N/a
"Es amor"	—N/a
"Es el amor"	—N/a
"Frida"	—N/a
"Juntos"	—N/a
"Hoy he vuelto a este lugar"	—N/a
"Más que sueños"	—N/a
"Mejor que él"	—N/a
"No me hace falta más"	Qualified
"Nunca será tarde"	—N/a
"Para morir así"	—N/a
"Pecador y creyente"	—N/a
"Por un momento"	—N/a
"Pretendimos a tiempo"	—N/a
"Qué difícil será olvidarte"	Qualified
"Qué mal te va sin mí"	—N/a
"Quédate"	—N/a
"Señores del jurado, me declaro culpable"	—N/a
"Simple y llanamente"	—N/a
"Te extraño"	—N/a
"Territorios H.S."	Qualified
"Tómame"	—N/a
"Una última sonrisa"	—N/a
"Y es él"	—N/a
"Y nada más"	Qualified
"Y sé que vas a llorar"	—N/a

=== Semi-final ===
The semi-final was held on Saturday 7 October 1989. After all the competing entries were performed, each of the ten jurors cast one vote for each of their eight favorite entries, and the eight most voted songs went on to the final. The same jurors that voted in the qualifying rounds, voted in the semi-final.

Result of the semi-final of the National OTI Festival – Mexico 1989
R/O	Song	Artist	Votes	Result
1	"No me hace falta más"	Jade	3	—N/a
2	"Loco"	José Roberto	1	—N/a
3	"Del otro lado del mundo"	Gitano	3	—N/a
4	"Un rayo de luz"	Dianna	6	Qualified
5	"Y aquí estoy"	Francisco Xavier	9	Qualified
6	"¿Cómo fue?"	Yoshio	5	Qualified
7	"Taciturno amor"	Pablo Raffi	10	Qualified
8	"Territorios H.S."	Cecilia Toussaint	4	—N/a
9	"Qué difícil será olvidarte"	Tiempo Nuevo	0	—N/a
10	"Qué bonito es vivir"	Felipe Gil	1	—N/a
11	"Cuesta arriba"	Antonio	8	Qualified
12	"Una canción no es suficiente"	Analí	10	Qualified
13	"Después de ti, después de mí"	Alejandro Filio	4	—N/a
14	"Nadie se va del todo"	Sergio Esquivel	9	Qualified
15	"Y nada más"	Jesús Monárrez	5	Qualified
16	"Carta"	Magdalena Zárate	2	—N/a

Detailed vote of the semi-final of the National OTI Festival – Mexico 1989
R/O	Song	Agustín Jiménez	Sylvia Tapia	M. Eugenia de Esesarte	Leopoldo Meraz	Álvaro Dávila	Jesús Vázquez	Luis G. Basurto	Gustavo Rivera	Rafael Acosta	Rubén Zepeda	Total
1	"No me hace falta más"			1	1					1		3
2	"Loco"	1										1
3	"Del otro lado del mundo"		1					1			1	3
4	"Un rayo de luz"	1	1				1	1	1		1	6
5	"Y aquí estoy"		1	1	1	1	1	1	1	1	1	9
6	"¿Cómo fue?"	1	1					1	1		1	5
7	"Taciturno amor"	1	1	1	1	1	1	1	1	1	1	10
8	"Territorios H.S."			1		1	1			1		4
9	"Qué dificil será olvidarte"											0
10	"Qué bonito es vivir"					1						1
11	"Cuesta arriba"	1	1	1	1		1	1	1		1	8
12	"Una canción no es suficiente"	1	1	1	1	1	1	1	1	1	1	10
13	"Después de ti, después de mí"				1	1	1			1		4
14	"Nadie se va del todo"	1		1	1	1	1	1	1	1	1	9
15	"Y nada más"	1	1	1		1				1		5
16	"Carta"				1				1			2

=== Final ===
The six-song final was held on Sunday 8 October 1989. The final was held in two rounds. In the first round, each of the ten jurors cast one vote for each of their three favorite entries, and the three most voted songs went on to the superfinal. In the superfinal, each juror announced aloud one vote for their favourite entry. The same jurors that voted in the qualifying rounds and the semi-final, voted in the final. The show featured guest performances by Daniela Romo, Benito, Gualberto Castro, and Ray Conniff.

The winner was "Una canción no es suficiente", written by Jesús Monárrez, and performed by Analí. The festival ended with a reprise of the winning entry.

Result of the final of the National OTI Festival – Mexico 1989
R/O	Song	Artist	Votes	Result
1	"Y nada más"	Jesús Monárrez	1	4
2	"Un rayo de luz"	Dianna	0	5
3	"Cuesta arriba"	Antonio	1	4
4	"Nadie se va del todo"	Sergio Esquivel	10	Qualified
5	"Una canción no es suficiente"	Analí	8	Qualified
6	"¿Cómo fue?"	Yoshio	1	4
7	"Y aquí estoy"	Francisco Xavier	8	Qualified
8	"Taciturno amor"	Pablo Raffi	1	4

Detailed vote of the final of the National OTI Festival – Mexico 1989
R/O	Song	Rubén Zepeda	Leopoldo Meraz	Álvaro Dávila	Agustín Jiménez	Gustavo Rivera	Rafael Acosta	Sylvia Tapia	Luis G. Basurto	M. Eugenia de Esesarte	Jesús Vázquez	Total
1	"Y nada más"						1					1
2	"Cuesta arriba"											0
3	"Cuesta arriba"					1						1
4	"Nadie se va del todo"	1	1	1	1	1	1	1	1	1	1	10
5	"Una canción no es suficiente"	1	1	1	1			1	1	1	1	8
6	"¿Cómo fue?"				1							1
7	"Y aquí estoy"	1	1	1			1	1	1	1	1	8
8	"Taciturno amor"					1						1

Winner

Result of the superfinal of the National OTI Festival – Mexico 1989
R/O	Song	Artist	Votes	Result
1	"Nadie se va del todo"	Sergio Esquivel	3	2
2	"Una canción no es suficiente"	Analí	6	1
3	"Y aquí estoy"	Francisco Xavier	1	3

Detailed vote of the superfinal of the National OTI Festival – Mexico 1989
R/O	Song	Rubén Zepeda	Leopoldo Meraz	Álvaro Dávila	Agustín Jiménez	Gustavo Rivera	Rafael Acosta	Sylvia Tapia	Luis G. Basurto	M. Eugenia de Esesarte	Jesús Vázquez	Total
1	"Nadie se va del todo"		1	1		1						3
2	"Una canción no es suficiente"	1			1			1	1	1	1	6
3	"Y aquí estoy"						1					1

=== Merit awards ===
In the final, the jurors voted for the Best Male and Female Performer among the shortlisted artist in each category. Yoshio received the Best Male Performer Award; and Magdalena Zárate the Best Female Performer Award.

=== Official album ===
12 finalistas del XVIII Festival OTI 89 is the official compilation album of the eighteenth edition of the Mexican National OTI Festival, released by Melody Internacional in 1989. The vinyl LP features the studio version of twelve of the songs qualified for the semi-final.

== At the OTI Festival ==
On 18 November 1989, the OTI Festival was held at the theater of the James L. Knight Center in Miami, United States, hosted by Univision, and broadcast live throughout Ibero-America. Analí performed "Una canción no es suficiente" in position 14, placing first out of 22 competing entries, winning the festival. This was the fourth entry from Mexico that won the OTI Festival, after winning in 1973, in 1975, and in 1985.
