= Mexico in the OTI Festival 1979 =

- OTI Festival 1979
- Participating broadcaster: Televisa
- Country: Mexico
- Selection process: National OTI Festival

Competing entry
- Song: "Vivir sin ti"
- Artist: Estela Núñez
- Songwriters: Roberto Robles; Eduardo Magallanes

Placement
- Final result: 8th, 18 points

Participation chronology
◄1978 •	1979	• 1980►

Mexico was represented at the OTI Festival 1979 with the song "Vivir sin ti", written by Roberto Robles and Eduardo Magallanes, and performed by Estela Núñez. The Mexican participating broadcaster, Televisa, selected its entry through a national televised competition with several phases. The song, that was performed in position 13, placed eighth out of 21 competing entries, with 18 points.

== National stage ==
Televisa held a national competition with four televised qualifying rounds and a final to select its entry for the 8th edition of the OTI Festival. This eight edition of the National OTI Festival featured 32 songs, of which ten reached the final. In addition to the general competition, awards were given for Best Male Performer, Best Female Performer, Best Musical Arrangement, and Breakout Artist, among all the competing artists.

The shows were held at Teatro de la Ciudad in Mexico City, were presented by Raúl Velasco, and were broadcast on Canal 2. The musical director was Chucho Ferrrer, who conducted the Single Union of Music Workers of Mexico orchestra when required. Hermanos Zavala, the single mixed backing choir of four voices, were credited on the songs they accompanied.

Competing entries on the National OTI Festival – Mexico 1979
Song	Artist	Songwriter(s)	Conductor
"Aire amigo"	Octavio	Octavio	
"Al final"	Emmanuel	Roberto Cantoral	Chucho Ferrer
"Amor"	Johnny Laboriel	Felipe Gil	
"Amor de abril"	María Medina	Carlos Medina; María Medina	
"Atrévete a negar"	Manolo Muñoz	Alejandro Correa	
"Canta, conmigo canta"	Los Randall	Víctor Aguilar	
"Conclusión"	Guadalupe Trigo and Viola	Guadalupe Trigo	Mario Patrón
"Desde hoy he decidido"	María del Sol	Graciela González	
"El ave y el hombre"	Los Cava	Los Cava	
"Esto es amor"	Salvador Amor	Ramón Amor	
"Estreno"	Yoshio	Roberto Cantoral	
"Gracias señor"	Tirzo Paiz	Tirzo Paiz	
"Me cansé de ti"	Ga-bí	Víctor Alberti	
"Mi querido amor"	Irasema	Irasema	
"Mujer de noche"	Fernando Riba	Fernando Riba	
"No llores América"	Arianna	Óscar Salvador	
"Oración"	Víctor Yturbe	Mario Molina Montes	
"Para renacer"	Grupo Hermanos and friends	Martha Cano	
"Para ti, para mí"	Grupo Tabasco	Armando Manzanero	Chucho Ferrer
"Poema mudo"	Joan Sebastian	Joan Sebastian	
"Pobre tristeza"	Luis Augusto Herba	Luis Augusto Herba	
"Primavera en jaula"	Rosalba	David Haro	
"Quiero saberlo bien"	José Roberto	José Roberto	
"Recuerdo pequeña"	Benito Castro	Benito Castro	
"Sembrador de mañanas"	Felipe Gil	Felipe Gil	Chucho Ferrer
"Si fueras tú"	Grupo Aria 8	José Sabre Marroquín	
"Siempre hay un mañana"	Yuri	Irasema	
"Sublime historia"	Gilda	Cuitláhuac Delgado	
"Tienen rosas las espinas"	Los Cinco Amigos	José Sierra Flores	
"Un tipo como yo"	Sergio Esquivel	Sergio Esquivel	Jonathán Zarzosa
"Vivir sin ti"	Estela Núñez	Roberto Robles; Eduardo Magallanes	Eduardo Magallanes
"Volver a amar"	Luis Daniel and Jaime	Sergio Ortiz	

=== Qualifying rounds ===
The four qualifying rounds were held on Saturdays 21 and 28 July, and 4 and 11 August 1979. There were eight entries in each round, of which the ten highest-scoring entries among the 32 competing advanced to the final. Ten expert jurors present in the hall and five remote provincial juries scored all the entries.

The jurors present in the hall were: Tina Galindo, Gustavo Rivera, Guillermo Acosta, Manú Dornbierer, Tino Martin, Ernesto Juárez, Consuelo Chávez, Rogelio Brambila Pelayo, Elías Cervantes, and Alfredo Gil, who was the chairperson.

Qualifier

Result of the qualifying rounds of the National OTI Festival – Mexico 1979
R/O	Song	Artist	Result
First qualifying round – 21 July 1979
1	"Tienen rosas las espinas"	Los Cinco Amigos	—N/a
2	"Esto es amor"	Salvador Amor	—N/a
3	"Volver a amar"	Luis Daniel and Jaime	—N/a
4	"Recuerdo pequeña"	Benito Castro	Qualified
5	"Canta, conmigo canta"	Los Randall	Qualified
6	"Sublime historia"	Gilda	—N/a
7	"Gracias señor"	Tirzo Paiz	—N/a
8	"Amor de abril"	María Medina	—N/a
Second qualifying round – 28 July 1979
1	"Para renacer"	Grupo Hermanos and friends	—N/a
2	"Pobre tristeza"	Luis Augusto Herba	—N/a
3	"Primavera en jaula"	Rosalba	—N/a
4	"Quiero saberlo bien"	José Roberto	—N/a
5	"Si fueras tú"	Grupo Aria 8	—N/a
6	"Sembrador de mañanas"	Felipe Gil	—N/a
7	"No llores América"	Arianna	—N/a
8	"Amor"	Johnny Laboriel	Qualified
Third qualifying round – 4 August 1979
1	"Conclusión"	Guadalupe Trigo and Viola	—N/a
2	"Aire amigo"	Octavio	—N/a
3	"Siempre hay un mañana"	Yuri	—N/a
4	"Poema mudo"	Joan Sebastian	—N/a
5	"Para ti, para mí"	Grupo Tabasco	Qualified
6	"Un tipo como yo"	Sergio Esquivel	Qualified
7	"Al final"	Emmanuel	Qualified
8	"Vivir sin ti"	Estela Núñez	Qualified
Fourth qualifying round – 11 August 1979
1	"El ave y el hombre"	Los Cava	—N/a
2	"Me cansé de ti"	Ga-bí	—N/a
3	"Mujer de noche"	Fernando Riba	—N/a
4	"Mi querido amor"	Irasema	—N/a
5	"Estreno"	Yoshio	Qualified
6	"Desde hoy he decidido"	María del Sol	—N/a
7	"Atrévete a negar"	Manolo Muñoz	Qualified
8	"Oración"	Víctor Yturbe	Qualified

=== Final ===
The final opened with a medley of the seven previous winners of the national festival performed by the orchestra conducted by Guillermo Méndez Guiú and the backing choir. Following each of the competing entries, each of the performers received on stage a finalist diploma delivered by a celebrity such as: Héctor Meneses, Lolita de la Colina, Silvia Pinal, and Sergio Corona. The interval act featured a performance of the cast of La Carabina de Ambrosio.

The same jurors present in the hall for the qualifying rounds were also present for the final, with the exception of Acosta who was replaced by Peter Ulrich. For the final competition, five international members were added: Tomás Fundora, Omar Marchant, Joaquín Blaya, Pilar Candel, and Rafael Martínez Amador. They were joined by five remote provincial juries of five members each located in Guadalajara, Nuevo Laredo, Mérida, Veracruz, and Monterrey. Each of the ten present jurors and the five remote juries scored between 1 and 10 points each of the finalists. After all the competing entries had been performed, the spokesperson of each remote jury announced their points in the order of performance via telephone; while the jurors in the hall showed their scores, that had already been previously counted, on boards all at once for each of the songs.

The winner was "Vivir sin ti", written by Roberto Robles and Eduardo Magallanes, and performed by Estela Núñez; with "Al final", written by Roberto Cantoral and performed by Emmanuel, placing second; and "Un tipo como yo", written and performed by Sergio Esquivel, placing third. The final results were met with loud booing from some of the audience. The festival ended with a reprise of the winning entry.

Winner

Result of the final of the National OTI Festival – Mexico 1979
R/O	Song	Artist	Points	Result
1	"Para ti, para mí"	Grupo Tabasco	122	7
2	"Un tipo como yo"	Sergio Esquivel	166	3
3	"Al final"	Emmanuel	168	2
4	"Vivir sin ti"	Estela Núñez	172	1
5	"Canta, conmigo canta"	Los Randall	122	7
6	"Atrévete a negar"	Manolo Muñoz	143	5
7	"Estreno"	Yoshio	147	4
8	"Recuerdo pequeña"	Benito Castro	119	10
9	"Amor"	Johnny Laboriel	139	6
10	"Oración"	Víctor Yturbe	122	7

Detailed Vote of the National OTI Festival final – Mexico 1979
R/O	Song	Provincial juries					Jurors in the hall	Total
R/O	Song	Guadalajara	Nuevo Laredo	Mérida	Veracruz	Monterrey	Jurors in the hall	Total
1	"Para ti, para mí"	8	6	6	7	6	89	122
2	"Un tipo como yo"	7	6	8	7	10	128	166
3	"Al final"	9	10	10	10	9	120	168
4	"Vivir sin ti"	7	8	7	9	9	132	172
5	"Canta, conmigo canta"	6	7	5	6	7	91	122
6	"Atrévete a negar"	8	6	6	8	6	109	143
7	"Estreno"	8	9	7	6	7	110	147
8	"Recuerdo pequeña"	6	5	5	5	8	90	119
9	"Amor"	7	7	6	7	6	106	139
10	"Oración"	7	6	9	7	7	86	122

Jurors in the hall
National	Tina Galindo; Gustavo Rivera; Peter Ulrich; Alfredo Gil (chairperson); Manú Dornbierer; Tino Martin; Ernesto Juárez; Consuelo Chávez; Rogelio Brambila Pelayo; Elías Cervantes
International	Tomás Fundora; Omar Marchant; Joaquín Blaya; Pilar Candel; Rafael Martínez Amador

Provincial juries members
Provincial Jury	Coordinator/Spokesperson	Members
Guadalajara	Alejandro Pickering Carvajal	Enrique Romo; María Antonieta Vázquez; David Cornejo; Ivonne Ostler Pujol; Fernando Cortés
Nuevo León	Ramoncita Esparza	Eusebio Salas Peralta; Antonio Sarabia; Angelica Vela de Villarreal; Margarita Gutierrez; Rocío Medellín
Mérida	Rodrigo Rubio	Miriam Gamboa de Solís; Jorge Peniche Peniche; Víctor Espinosa Ávila; Jorge Carlos Castro; Gonzalo Domínguez Soto
Veracruz	Antonio Liaño	Norma Olivier Decano; Rosalinda Hermida de Heredia; Guillermo Ruiz; Domingo Lucas
Monterrey	Horacio Pedraza	Edgardo Arrambide; Francisco Morales; Jorge Alberto Garza; Marisela Ruiz

=== Merit awards ===
In the final, the nine jurors who were present in all the qualifying rounds voted aloud for the Best Male and Female Performer Awards and Breakout Artist Award among the three shortlisted artist in each category. The members of the orchestra voted for the Best Musical Arrangement Award among the three entries shortlisted.

Yoshio received the Best Male Performer Award; Estela Núñez the Best Female Performer Award; Eduardo Magallanes the Best Musical Arrangement Award for "Vivir sin ti"; and Yuri the Breakout Artist Award. The four winners of the merit awards received both a gold and a silver medal.

Best Male Performer
Artist	Votes	Result
Yoshio	8	1
Emmanuel	0	3
Manolo Muñoz	1	2

Best Female Performer
Artist	Votes	Result
María Medina	3	2
Estela Núñez	6	1
Ga-bí	0	3

Best Musical Arrangement
Song	Arranger	Votes	Result
"Vivir sin ti"	Eduardo Magallanes	37	1
"Sembrador de mañanas"	Chucho Ferrer	29	2
"Conclusión"	Mario Patrón	14	3

Breakout Artist
Artist	Votes	Result
Yuri	9	1
Arianna	0	2
María del Sol	0	2

=== Official album ===
Las 10 finalistas del Festival OTI 79 is the official compilation album of the eighth edition of the Mexican National OTI Festival, released by Productos Especiales CBS in 1979. The vinyl LP features the studio version of the ten songs qualified for the national final.

== At the OTI Festival ==
On 8 December 1979, the OTI Festival was held at the Theatre of the Military Academy in Caracas, Venezuela, hosted by Radio Caracas Televisión (RCTV), Venevisión, Televisora Nacional (TVN), and Venezolana de Televisión (VTV), and broadcast live throughout Ibero-America. Estela Núñez performed "Vivir sin ti" in position 13, with Eduardo Magallanes conducting the event's orchestra, and placing eighth out of 21 competing entries, with 18 points.

=== Voting ===
Each participating broadcaster assembled a jury who awarded 5–1 points to their five favourite songs in order of preference.

Points awarded to Mexico
Score	Country
5 points	
4 points	Spain
3 points	Guatemala; Honduras
2 points	Costa Rica; El Salvador; Uruguay
1 point	Argentina; Peru

Points awarded by Mexico
Score	Country
5 points	Venezuela
4 points	Argentina
3 points	Puerto Rico
2 points	Spain
1 point	Portugal
