= Mexico in the OTI Festival 1975 =

- OTI Festival 1975
- Participating broadcaster: Televisa
- Country: Mexico
- Selection process: National OTI Festival
- Selection date: 5 October 1975

Competing entry
- Song: "La felicidad"
- Artist: Gualberto Castro
- Songwriter: Felipe Gil

Placement
- Final result: 1st, 20 votes

Participation chronology
◄1974 •	1975	• 1976►

Mexico was represented at the OTI Festival 1975 with the song "La felicidad", written by Felipe Gil, and performed by Gualberto Castro. The Mexican participating broadcaster, Televisa, selected its entry through a national televised competition with several phases. The song, that was performed in position 16, placed first out of 19 competing entries, winning the festival with 20 votes. This was the second entry from Mexico that won the OTI Festival, after winning in 1973.

== National stage ==
Televisa held a national competition with four televised qualifying rounds and a final to select its entry for the 4th edition of the OTI Festival. This fourth edition of the National OTI Festival featured 32 songs, of which nine reached the final. In addition to the general competition, awards were given for Best Performer and Best Musical Arrangement, among all the competing artists.

The shows were held at Studio 2 of Televisa San Ángel in Mexico City, were presented by Raúl Velasco, and were broadcast on Canal 2 within the show Siempre en Domingo. The musical director was Chucho Ferrrer, who conducted the orchestra when required.

Competing entries on the National OTI Festival – Mexico 1975
Song	Artist	Songwriter(s)	Conductor
"Amor y tiempo"	Héctor Meneses	Héctor Meneses	Mario Patrón
"Cantemos de amores"	Los Randall	Martha Cano	Chucho Ferrer
"Como cuando empezabas"	Mónica Ygual	José María Napoleón	
"De ti para mí, de mí para ti"	María Medina	Eduardo Magallanes; Mario Molina Montes	Eduardo Magallanes
"Después de esa noche"	Raúl Marti	Rogelio A. González	
"Dime amigo viento"	Los Randall	Raúl Aguilar; Edgar Aguilar	
"¿Dónde vas amor?"	Mario Eduardo	Octavio	
"El día llegará"	Roberto Jordán	Juan Manuel Anzaldua	
"Esa mujer y yo"	Gualberto Castro	Felipe Gil; Mario Arturo	
"Eso es mi amor por ti"	Enrique Cáceres	Fernando Z. Maldonado	
"Guadalupe estrella"	Perla Negra	Eduardo Tornell	
"Ha nacido el hombre"	Yoshio	Yoshio; Miguel Ángel Medina	
"La felicidad"	Gualberto Castro	Felipe Gil	Chucho Ferrer
"Me da miedo tu amor"	Héctor Meneses	Héctor Meneses	Mario Patrón
"Me enamoré"	Manolo Muñoz	Eduardo Tornell	
"Me gusta andar los caminos"	Sergio Esquivel	Sergio Esquivel	
"Mestizo"	Alberto Ángel	Alberto Ángel	
"Mi ruego"	Roberto Jordán	Roberto Pérez Flores; Juan M. López Lee	
"Niño"	José María Napoleón	José María Napoleón	
"No hay soledad"	Perla Negra	Carlos Blanco	
"No quiero crecer"	Sergio Guerra	Rafael Aguirre	
"Nuestra casa"	Álvaro Dávila	Álvaro Dávila	
"Pobrecito niño"	Manolo Muñoz	Manolo Muñoz	
"¿Quién gritó de amor cuando nací?"	Silvia Roar	Arnulfo M. Vega	
"Quiero ser parte de usted"	María Medina	Jonathán Zarzosa	
"Soy una canción"	Álvaro Dávila	Álvaro Dávila	
"Tu corazón me llama"	Raúl Marti	Eduardo Piña	
"Volver a ti"	Luis Heredia	Luis Heredia	
"Volver a vivir"	Javier del Valle	Rubén Rodríguez	
"Volverán los días felices"	Mario Eduardo	Sergio Esquivel	
"Vuelves a casa"	La Nopalera	Mario Patrón; Mario Arturo	
"Ya te extraño y no te has ido"	Manuel	Amparo Rubín	

=== Qualifying rounds ===
The four qualifying rounds were held on Sundays 7, 14, 21, and 28 September 1975. The eight highest-scoring entries among the 32 competing advanced to the final.

Qualifier

Result of the qualifying rounds of the National OTI Festival – Mexico 1975
R/O	Song	Artist	Result
First qualifying round – 7 September 1975
1	"No quiero crecer"	Sergio Guerra	—N/a
2	"Guadalupe estrella"	Perla Negra	—N/a
3	"Después de esa noche"	Raúl Marti	—N/a
4	"¿Quién gritó de amor cuando nací?"	Silvia Roar	—N/a
5	"Volver a vivir"	Javier del Valle	—N/a
6	"¿Dónde vas amor?"	Mario Eduardo	—N/a
7	"Cantemos de amores"	Los Randall	Qualified
8	"Me enamoré"	Manolo Muñoz	Qualified
Second qualifying round – 14 September 1975
1	"Ya te extraño y no te has ido"	Manuel	—N/a
2	"Ha nacido el hombre"	Yoshio	—N/a
3	"Mi ruego"	Roberto Jordán	—N/a
4	"Vuelves a casa"	La Nopalera	—N/a
5	"Soy una canción"	Álvaro Dávila	—N/a
6	"Quiero ser parte de usted"	María Medina	—N/a
7	"Esa mujer y yo"	Gualberto Castro	Qualified
8	"Me da miedo tu amor"	Héctor Meneses	Qualified
Third qualifying round – 21 September 1975
1	"Volverán los días felices"	Mario Eduardo	—N/a
2	"Mestizo"	Alberto Ángel	—N/a
3	"Como cuando empezabas"	Mónica Ygual	—N/a
4	"Volver a ti"	Luis Heredia	—N/a
5	"Niño"	José María Napoleón	—N/a
6	"Eso es mi amor por ti"	Enrique Cáceres	Qualified
7	"Nuestra casa"	Álvaro Dávila	—N/a
8	"No hay soledad"	Perla Negra	—N/a
Fourth qualifying round – 28 September 1975
1	"Tu corazón me llama"	Raúl Marti	—N/a
2	"Me gusta andar los caminos"	Sergio Esquivel	—N/a
3	"Amor y tiempo"	Héctor Meneses	Qualified
4	"Pobrecito niño"	Manolo Muñoz	—N/a
5	"De ti para mí, de mí para ti"	María Medina	Qualified
6	"El día llegará"	Roberto Jordán	—N/a
7	"Dime amigo viento"	Los Randall	Qualified
8	"La felicidad"	Gualberto Castro	Qualified

=== Final ===
The final was held on Sunday 5 October 1975. The winner was "La felicidad", written by Felipe Gil, and performed by Gualberto Castro. The festival ended with a reprise of the winning entry. In addition, María Medina received the Best Performer Award and Eduardo Magallanes the Best Musical Arrangement Award.

Winner

Result of the final of the National OTI Festival – Mexico 1975
R/O	Song	Artist	Points	Result
1	"La felicidad"	Gualberto Castro	144	1
2	"Me da miedo tu amor"	Héctor Meneses	136	3
3	"De ti para mí, de mí para ti"	María Medina	141	2
4	"Esa mujer y yo"	Gualberto Castro	127	6
5	"Eso es mi amor por ti"	Enrique Cáceres	122	7
6	"Me enamoré"	Manolo Muñoz	119	9
7	"Amor y tiempo"	Héctor Meneses	130	4
8	"Cantemos de amores"	Los Randall	129	5
9	"Dime amigo viento"	Los Randall	122	7

== At the OTI Festival ==
On 15 November 1975, the OTI Festival was held at the WKAQ-TV studios in San Juan, Puerto Rico, hosted by WKAQ-Telemundo, and broadcast live throughout Ibero-America. Gualberto Castro performed "La felicidad" in position 16, with Chucho Ferrer conducting the event's orchestra, placing first out of 19 competing entries, winning the festival with 20 votes. This was the second entry from Mexico that won the OTI Festival, after winning in 1973.
