= Mexico in the OTI Festival 1972 =

- OTI Festival 1972
- Participating broadcaster: Telesistema Mexicano (TSM)
- Country: Mexico
- Selection process: National OTI Festival
- Selection date: 24 September 1972

Competing entry
- Song: "Yo no voy a la guerra"
- Artist: Alberto Ángel "El Cuervo"
- Songwriter: Roberto Cantoral

Placement
- Final result: Disqualified

Participation chronology
1972	• 1973►

Mexico was set to be represented at the OTI Festival 1972 with the song "Yo no voy a la guerra", written by Roberto Cantoral, and performed by Alberto Ángel "El Cuervo". The Mexican participating broadcaster, Telesistema Mexicano (TSM), had selected its entry through a national televised competition with several phases. The song, was disqualified by the Organización de Televisión Iberoamericana (OTI) Program Commission because its lyrics didn't comply with the rules of the competition for going against "the idiosyncratic sensitivity or way of life of the Ibero-American peoples". They requested TSM to send a replacement song, but the broadcaster refused to do so.

== National stage ==
Telesistema Mexicano (TSM) held a national competition with four televised qualifying rounds and a final to select its entry for the 1st edition of the OTI Festival. This first edition of the National OTI Festival featured 31 songs, of which sixteen reached the final.

The shows were presented by Raúl Velasco, and were broadcast on Canal 2 within the show Siempre en Domingo. The musical director was Chucho Ferrrer, who conducted the orchestra when required.

Competing entries on the National OTI Festival – Mexico 1972
Song	Artist	Songwriter(s)	Conductor
"Amiga tristeza"	Sola	Héctor Meneses	
"Canto"	José María Napoleón	José María Napoleón	
"Con amor"	Raúl Marti	Jonathán Zarzosa; Juan Manuel López Lee	
"Dime quién es"	Ethel	Roberto Cantoral	
"El viento"	Óscar Chávez	Chamín Correa	
"Es"	Patrizio	Chamín Correa	
"Fue"	Alejandra	José María Napoleón	
"Huellas de sangre"	Carlos Gerardo	Carlos Gerardo	
"Lejos de mi vida"	Edy Martín	Óscar García R.	
"Mami"	Carlos María	Carlos Lico	
"Me tienes que querer"	Mariano Vega	Mariano Vega	
"Mi mundo eres tú"	Aidee del Río	Felipe Gil	
"Mi poblado"	Teodoro	Carlos Trejo Zambrano	
"Ojos gitanos"	Juan Luis	Juan Luis	
"Olvidar tu ayer en mi hoy"	Grupo Alfa Zeta	Arnulfo M. Vega	
"Para todo el mundo"	Alejandra	Daniel Hernández	
"¿Por qué será?"	Carlos Gerardo	Carlos Gerardo	
"Pregúntale a las estrellas"	Carlos Blanco	Carlos Blanco	
"Qué frías noches"	Raúl Marti	Eduardo Piña	
"Quiero sufrirle a la vida"	Martha Ventura	Felipe Gil	
"Retrato de dos amantes"	Sergio Esquivel	Sergio Esquivel	
"Santísima muerte"	Óscar Chávez	Óscar Chávez	
"Será mañana"	Juan Gabriel	Juan Gabriel	
"Sin ilusión"	Teodoro	Hesiquio Ramos; Víctor M. Hernández	
"Una historia y un final"	Freddy Pérez Valencia	Marcos Lizama; Julián Alcántara	
"Uno, dos, tres (y me das un beso)"	Juan Gabriel	Juan Gabriel	
"Una rosa en la esquina"	Raúl Marti	Jonathán Zarzosa; Juan Manuel López Lee	
"Vida"	Alfredo Cuevas	Jorge Ortega; Federico Baena Solís	
"Vienes"	Ethel	Andrés Córdova	
"Voy a ser de ti"	Sola	Felipe Gil	
"Yo no voy a la guerra"	Alberto Ángel "El Cuervo"	Roberto Cantoral	

=== Qualifying rounds ===
The four qualifying rounds were held on Sundays 27 August, and 3, 10, and 17 September 1972. The sixteen highest-scoring entries among the 31 competing advanced to the final.

Qualifier

Result of the qualifying rounds of the National OTI Festival – Mexico 1972
R/O	Song	Artist	Result
First qualifying round – 27 August 1972
1	"Con amor"	Raúl Marti	Qualified
2	"Yo no voy a la guerra"	Alberto Ángel "El Cuervo"	Qualified
3	"Será mañana"	Juan Gabriel	Qualified
4	"Vienes"	Ethel	—N/a
5	"Santísima muerte"	Óscar Chávez	—N/a
6	"Mi mundo eres tú"	Aidee del Río	—N/a
7	"Pregúntale a las estrellas"	Carlos Blanco	—N/a
8	"Una historia y un final"	Freddy Pérez Valencia	—N/a
Second qualifying round – 3 September 1972
1	"Canto"	José María Napoleón	Qualified
2	"Olvidar tu ayer en mi hoy"	Grupo Alfa Zeta	—N/a
3	"Es"	Patrizio	Qualified
4	"Quiero sufrirle a la vida"	Martha Ventura	—N/a
5	"Vida"	Alfredo Cuevas	—N/a
6	"Dime quién es"	Ethel	Qualified
7	"Uno, dos, tres (y me das un beso)"	Juan Gabriel	—N/a
Third qualifying round – 10 September 1972
1	"Para todo el mundo"	Alejandra	—N/a
2	"Sin ilusión"	Teodoro	—N/a
3	"Amiga tristeza"	Sola	Qualified
4	"Lejos de mi vida"	Edy Martín	—N/a
5	"Qué frías noches"	Raúl Marti	Qualified
6	"Retrato de dos amantes"	Sergio Esquivel	—N/a
7	"Huellas de sangre"	Carlos Gerardo	—N/a
8	"El viento"	Óscar Chávez	Qualified
Fourth qualifying round – 17 September 1972
1	"Me tienes que querer"	Mariano Vega	Qualified
2	"Mami"	Carlos María	Qualified
3	"¿Por qué será?"	Carlos Gerardo	Qualified
4	"Voy a ser de ti"	Sola	Qualified
5	"Fue"	Alejandra	Qualified
6	"Mi poblado"	Teodoro	Qualified
7	"Una rosa en la esquina"	Raúl Marti	Qualified
8	"Ojos gitanos"	Juan Luis	—N/a

=== Final ===
The final was held on Sunday 24 September 1972. The winner was "Yo no voy a la guerra", written by Roberto Cantoral, and performed by Alberto Ángel "El Cuervo". The festival ended with a reprise of the winning entry.

Winner

Result of the final of the National OTI Festival – Mexico 1972
R/O	Song	Artist	Result
1	"Con amor"	Raúl Marti	3
2	"Voy a ser de ti"	Sola	2
3	"Yo no voy a la guerra"	Alberto Ángel "El Cuervo"	1
4	"Dime quién es"	Ethel	4
5	"Qué frías noches"	Raúl Marti	
6	"Una rosa en la esquina"	Raúl Marti	6
7	"Amiga tristeza"	Sola	5
8	"¿Por qué será?"	Carlos Gerardo	7
9	"Canto"	José María Napoleón	
10	"Fue"	Alejandra	
11	"Mi poblado"	Teodoro	
12	"Será mañana"	Juan Gabriel	
13	"Me tienes que querer"	Mariano Vega	
14	"El viento"	Óscar Chávez	
15	"Mami"	Carlos María	
16	"Es"	Patrizio	

== At the OTI Festival ==
After TSM sent to the Organización de Televisión Iberoamericana (OTI) the documentation confirming "Yo no voy a la guerra" as its entry for the festival, the OTI Program Commission disqualified the song because its lyrics didn't comply with the rules of the competition for going against "the idiosyncratic sensitivity or way of life of the Ibero-American peoples". They requested TSM to send a replacement song, but the broadcaster refused to do so. Mexico had been drawn to perform between Colombia and Peru.

Following the disqualification, Roberto Cantoral sued TSM for breach of contract, and claimed that the disqualification generated "a severe and unfair boycott" against him within record labels and radio stations.
