= María Elena Saldaña =

Mexican actress and comedian

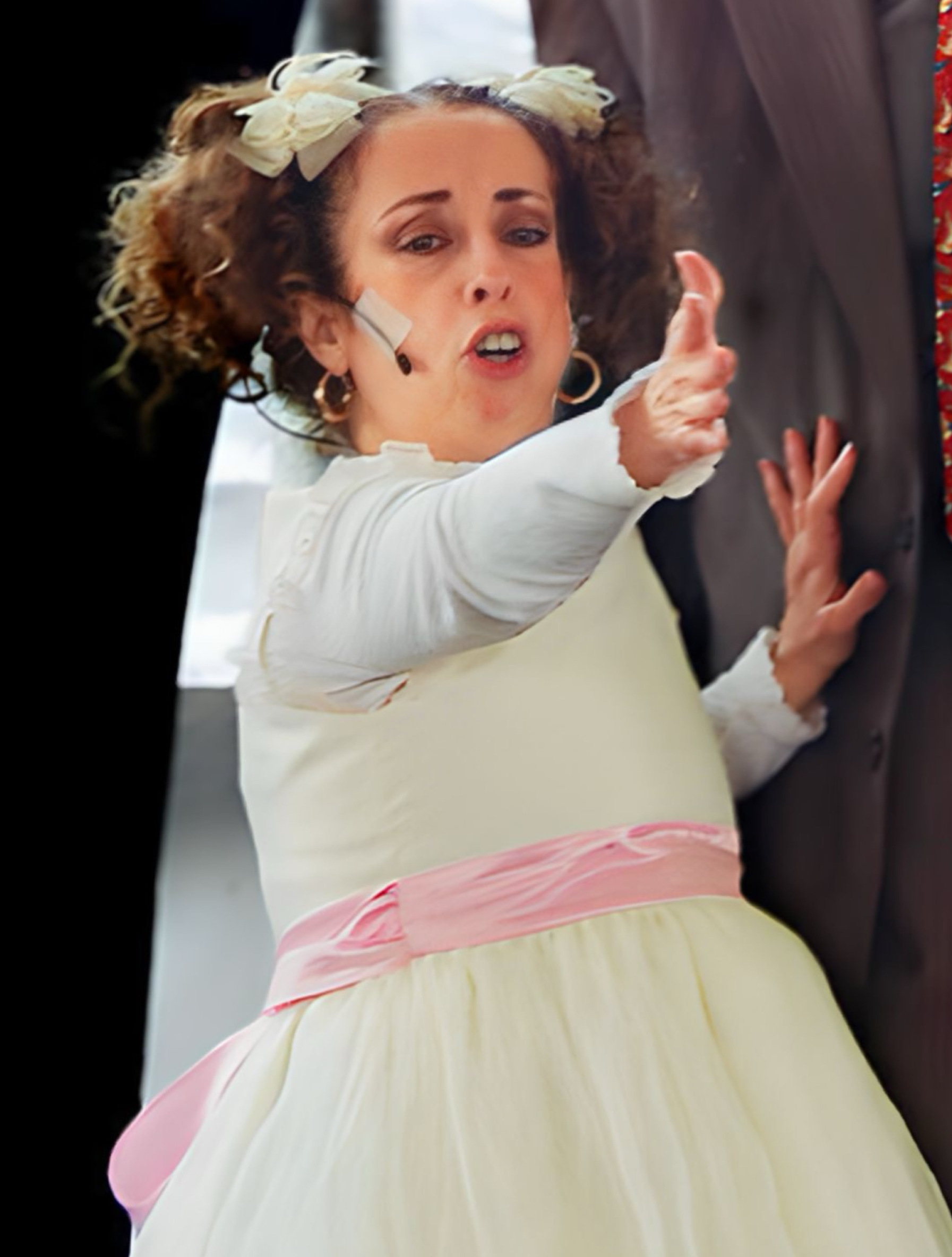
- Saldaña acting as "La Güereja" in 2014
- Born: 23 July 1963 (age 62); Veracruz, Veracruz, Mexico
- Occupation(s): Actress, comedian
- Years active: 1980–present
- Children: 2

María Elena Saldaña (Spanish pronunciation: [salˈdaɲa]; born 23 July 1963), also known as La Güereja, is a Mexican television actress whose career dates back to the mid-1980s. Saldaña, who has dwarfism due to an undetermined illness, has achieved fame over the years with her portrayal of a little Mexican girl named Mariquita Castro Pérez, nicknamed "La Güereja".

== Early life and career ==
Saldaña was born in Veracruz, Mexico, on 23 July 1963. She started acting while in school. During one class, in which the kids sang or recited poetry, Saldaña knew a story about a little girl much like herself, and with a classmate, performed a sketch in which Saldaña portrayed that little girl, the forerunner to her eventual "La Güereja" character. She then performed her act on a television station in Veracruz, and this led, in 1984, to Mexico City and a contract with Televisa. Once there, Saldaña began to appear on several of the network's comedy series, as well as the telenovela Volver a Empezar. On one of the comedies, Ándale!, Saldaña first met Benito Castro; the two starred in the segment "La Güereja y El Papiringo," which, in 1998 would become, under different producers, a television series of its own as La Güereja y Algo Más.

== La Güereja ==
Saldaña created La Güereja as sort of a female El Chavo. The character she plays is a 4-year-old Mexican girl who goes to school but whose home life tends to be a little wacky. La Güereja's hair is in two pigtails, and she wears a long dress. She was the star of two Televisa series, La Güereja y algo más and Güereja de mi vida. Both series aired in other countries in addition to Mexico, including Univision in the United States.

La Güereja y Algo Más premiered in 1998 and featured Saldaña in the role of not only La Güereja but also two characters that have become part of her repertoire: Mimí Piquín, a tiny actress, and the tiny nun Sor Zita. With her in the cast were Benito Castro, in the role of her father, Judy Ponte and Erika Bleher as nuns, José Natera, Jorge Arvizu, Cesar Bono, Eduardo España and Maru Dueñas. Dueñas was both seen as La Güereja's teacher and heard as her chauffeur. After three seasons, the series underwent a major change in 2001. The program became Güereja de mi vida, Castro was the only supporting cast member returning from the previous series, and the Mimí Piquín and Sor Zita sketches were dropped. Now entire episodes focused on La Güereja's home life. The series ended at the end of the year. The La Güereja series was one of two Televisa series appearing at the same time in which adult actors played children; the other was Jorge Ortiz de Pinedo's Cero en Conducta.

In addition to television, Saldaña has also performed in the Mexican theater, having performed in 35 different plays.
