= Mexico in the OTI Festival 1973 =

- OTI Festival 1973
- Participating broadcaster: Televisa
- Country: Mexico
- Selection process: National OTI Festival
- Selection date: 21 October 1973

Competing entry
- Song: "Qué alegre va María"
- Artist: Imelda Miller
- Songwriter: Celia Bonfil

Placement
- Final result: 1st, 10 votes

Participation chronology
| ◄1972 • | 1973 | • 1974► |

Mexico was represented at the OTI Festival 1973 with the song "Qué alegre va María", written by Celia Bonfil, and performed by Imelda Miller. The Mexican participating broadcaster, Televisa, selected its entry through a national televised competition with several phases. The song, that was performed in position 13, placed first out of 14 competing entries tying with the song from Peru in 10 votes, and winning the festival after applying the tie-breaking rule.

However, the national final had been won by "La canción del hombre", written by Felipe Gil and performed by Gualberto Castro, which became ineligible for the festival since it was later proven that it had been broadcast on the radio before the permitted date. "Qué alegre va María", which had been the runner-up in the national final, was sent instead. This was the first entry from Mexico to actually participate in the OTI Festival, since the previous year's entry was disqualified and no replacement was sent.

== National stage ==
Televisa held a national competition with three televised qualifying rounds and a final to select its debut entry for the 2th edition of the OTI Festival. This second edition of the National OTI Festival featured 23 songs, of which eight reached the final.

The shows were presented by Raúl Velasco, and were broadcast on Canal 2 within the show Siempre en Domingo. The musical director was Chucho Ferrrer, who conducted the orchestra when required.

Competing entries on the National OTI Festival – Mexico 1973
| Song | Artist | Songwriter(s) | Conductor |
|---|---|---|---|
| "Abraham" | Grupo Juglaría | Miguel Ángel Medina; Yoshio | |
| "Canción triste" | Jaime Moreno | Federico Méndez Tejeda; Héctor Luis Mendoza | |
| "Cuando volverás a mí" | Mónica Ygual | Mónica Ygual | |
| "De la noche a la mañana" | José Luis Almada | José Luis Almada | |
| "En tu lugar" | Irma Carlón | Vicente Garrido Calderón | |
| "Esa" | Jorge Vargas | Alberto Bustillos | |
| "Esta canción" | Fernando Allende | Luis Adame; Gustavo Jiménez | |
| "Fueron las mañanas" | Fátima | Rocco y Alessandro | |
| "Junto a ti, paloma" | Héctor Meneses | Héctor Meneses | |
| "La canción del hombre" | Gualberto Castro | Felipe Gil | |
| "Llegando al pueblo llovía" | Manuel | Carlos Blanco | |
| "Me gusta la voz del hombre" | José Luis Almada | José Luis Almada | |
| "Otro día" | Fernando Allende | Loustalot | |
| "Qué alegre va María" | Imelda Miller | Celia Bonfil | |
| "Quién pudiera dormir como duerme un niño" | Grupo Juglaría | Yoshio | |
| "Quiero seguir soñando" | David Verduzco | David Verduzco | |
| "Quiero sentirte amor" | Luis Moreno | Héctor Meneses | |
| "Si me quisieras como yo" | Luis Moreno | Roberto Magaña | |
| "Siempre de ti" | Fátima | David Haro | |
| "Su silencio" | Fernando Allende | Rocco y Alessandro | |
| "Te amo" | Gualberto Castro | Felipe Gil | |
| "Te sigo" | Irma Carlón | Pedro Luis Bartilotti | |
| "Un día de abril" | Jaime Moreno | Sergio Esquivel | |

=== Qualifying rounds ===
The three qualifying rounds were held on Sundays 30 September, and 7 and 14 October 1973. The eight highest-scoring entries among the 23 competing advanced to the final.

Qualifier

Result of the qualifying rounds of the National OTI Festival – Mexico 1973
| R/O | Song | Artist | Result |
First qualifying round – 30 September 1973
| 1 | "Quién pudiera dormir como duerme un niño" | Grupo Juglaría | Qualified |
| 2 | "Te sigo" | Irma Carlón | Qualified |
| 3 | "Llegando al pueblo llovía" | Manuel | —N/a |
| 4 | "Canción triste" | Jaime Moreno | —N/a |
| 5 | "Fueron las mañanas" | Fátima | —N/a |
| 6 | "Esta canción" | Fernando Allende | —N/a |
| 7 | "De la noche a la mañana" | José Luis Almada | —N/a |
| 8 | "Su silencio" | Fernando Allende | —N/a |
Second qualifying round – 7 October 1973
| 1 | "Te amo" | Gualberto Castro | Qualified |
| 2 | "Me gusta la voz del hombre" | José Luis Almada | Qualified |
| 3 | "Junto a ti, paloma" | Héctor Meneses | Qualified |
| 4 | "Esa" | Jorge Vargas | Qualified |
| 5 | "Cuando volverás a mí" | Mónica Ygual | —N/a |
| 6 | "En tu lugar" | Irma Carlón | —N/a |
| 7 | "Si me quisieras como yo" | Luis Moreno | —N/a |
| 8 | "Quiero seguir soñando" | David Verduzco | —N/a |
Third qualifying round – 14 October 1973
| 1 | "Abraham" | Grupo Juglaría | —N/a |
| 2 | "Otro día" | Fernando Allende | —N/a |
| 3 | "Siempre de ti" | Fátima | —N/a |
| 4 | "Quiero sentirte amor" | Luis Moreno | —N/a |
| 5 | "Un día de abril" | Jaime Moreno | —N/a |
| 6 | "Qué alegre va María" | Imelda Miller | Qualified |
| 7 | "La canción del hombre" | Gualberto Castro | Qualified |

=== Final ===
The final was held on Sunday 21 October 1973. The winner was "La canción del hombre", written by Felipe Gil and performed by Gualberto Castro. The festival ended with a reprise of the winning entry.

Winner

Result of the final of the National OTI Festival – Mexico 1973
| R/O | Song | Artist | Points | Result |
|---|---|---|---|---|
| 1 | "La canción del hombre" | Gualberto Castro | 146 | 1 |
| 2 | "Qué alegre va María" | Imelda Miller | 144 | 2 |
| 3 | "Te amo" | Gualberto Castro | 137 | 3 |
| 4 | "Junto a ti, paloma" | Héctor Meneses | 122 | 4 |
| 5 | "Me gusta la voz del hombre" | José Luis Almada | | |
| 6 | "Quién pudiera dormir como duerme un niño" | Grupo Juglaría | | |
| 7 | "Te sigo" | Irma Carlón | | |
| 8 | "Esa" | Jorge Vargas | | |

=== Song replacement ===
On 26 October 1973, "La canción del hombre" became ineligible for the OTI Festival since it was proven that it had been broadcast on the radio before the permitted date. The runner-up in the national final, "Qué alegre va María", written by Celia Bonfil, and performed by Imelda Miller, was signed up for the international competition instead.

== At the OTI Festival ==
On 10 November 1973, the OTI Festival was held at the Palácio das Artes in Belo Horizonte, Brazil, hosted by TV Itacolomi on behalf of Rede Tupi, and broadcast live throughout Ibero-America.

Imelda Miller performed "Qué alegre va María" in position 13, with Chucho Ferrer conducting the event's orchestra, and placing first out of 14 competing entries, in a tie in 10 votes with "El mundo gira por tu amor" by Gabriela de Jesús representing Peru. In the tie-breaking vote, Mexico received 7 votes and Peru 5, making "Qué alegre va María" the winning song.

=== Voting ===
Each participating broadcaster assembled a five-member jury, which each member voting for its favourite song.

Votes awarded to Mexico
| Score | Country |
|---|---|
| 3 votes | Argentina |
| 2 votes | Brazil |
| 1 vote | Dominican Republic; Puerto Rico; Spain; Uruguay; Venezuela |

Votes awarded by Mexico
| Score | Country |
|---|---|
| 1 vote | Dominican Republic; Panama; Peru; Portugal; Uruguay |
