= Manoella Torres =

American singer

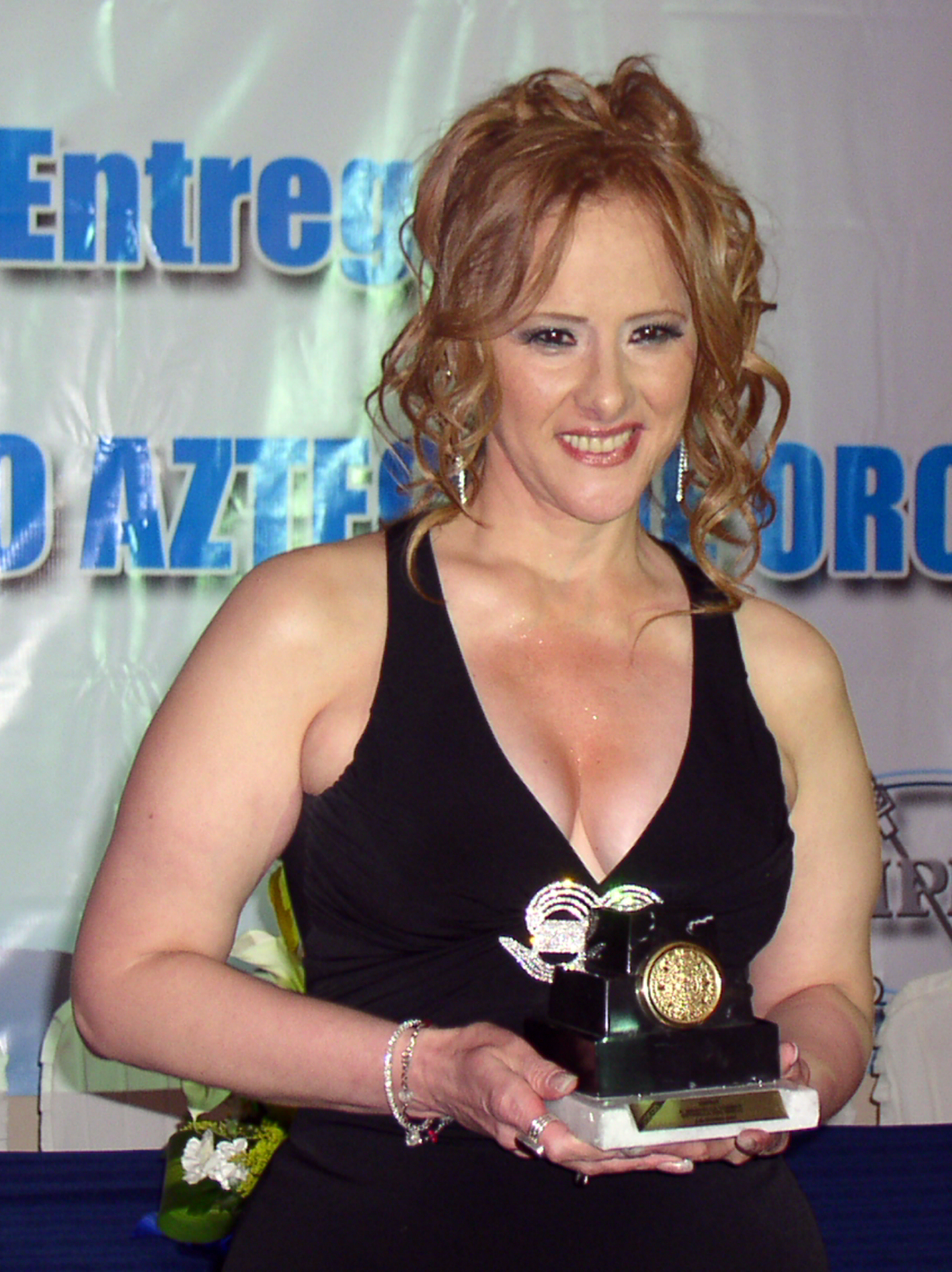
- Manoella Torres being awarded as "Star of the Century" with the "Golden Aztec Calendar" by the Mexican Association of Journalists of Radio and TV

Background information
- Also known as: The woman who was born to sing
- Born: Gloria Torres Calderón; New York City, United States
- Origin: United States
- Genres: Latin pop, mariachi, pop
- Occupations: Singer, actress
- Years active: 1972–present
- Labels: Columbia Records; Peerless Records; PolyGram Records; IM Records; Universal Music Group
- Website: manoellatorres.com

Manoella Torres is an American singer and actress of Puerto Rican descent based in Mexico who has had an extensive career that continues to this day. She has recorded over 350 songs by famous songwriters including Armando Manzanero, Juan Carlos Calderón, Juan Gabriel, Manuel Alejandro, Felicia Garza and Rafael Pérez Botija.

== Biography ==
Born as Gloria Torres Calderón, she was the daughter of Puerto Ricans Felicia Calderón and Jorge Torres. As a young girl she was sent to live with her maternal grandmother. She encouraged Gloria's talent while Gloria idolized singers like Cuco Sánchez, Los Panchos and Lucha Villa. In Mexico she continued to study vocalization and years later met the man who would take her career to the next level, Alfredo Marcelo Gil. He became her manager and initially gave her the stage name "Gloria Gil". She began making the rounds of musical events and television appearances where she met another important figure in her career, Armando Manzanero. Upon hearing her sing, he said "Niñita, tú naciste para cantar (Little girl, you were born to sing)". This quote would eventually become her media nickname "la mujer que nació para cantar (the woman who was born to sing)".

In 1971, she was offered a contract record deal with Columbia Records and her stage name was changed to "Manoella Torres". Her first album "Nació Para Cantar" included her first single record that Manzanero wrote titled "El Último Verano" became a smash hit throughout Mexico. Soon Manoella would amass hit after hit appearing regularly on "Siempre en Domingo" with Raúl Velasco. She appeared on numerous Mexican television variety shows and shared the stage with Mexico's most famous entertainers such as Verónica Castro and Gualberto Castro. Some of her greatest hits include "Ahora Que Soy Libre", "Te Voy A Enseñar A Querer", "Libre Como Gaviota", "Acaríciame", "Que Me Perdone Tu Señora", and quite possibly her most famous song "A La Que Vive Contigo", written by her mentor Armando Manzanero.

Towards the end of the 1970s, Manoella married Guillermo Diestel Pasquel, with whom she had a daughter, Erika. Later, it was discovered that he was abusive towards Manoella, resulting in her separation from her husband and in the mid-1980s she left Mexico. Disillusioned with love, she decided to focus on her life and her daughter. For three years, she had no contact with anyone of her previous life in Mexico. Deciding to end her marriage, and start anew, she returned to Mexico in 1988 and started performing.

In February 2007, Manoella Torres became part of Mexican television network TV Azteca's reality show titled "Disco de Oro", hosted by José Luis Rodríguez "El Puma", in which singers of the past compete in an interactive environment with the viewers. The winner got to release an album produced by the network but, unfortunately, Manoella achieved the third place.

Today she continues to tour continuously across Mexico and to release albums regularly, most of the time consisting of covers of herself and other famous singers.

== Discography ==
Release Date	Title	Track List	Label
1966	Gloria Gil (Recorded as Gloria Gil)	1. Dejaste De Ser; 2. En Una Flor; 3. Viento De Invierno; 4. Mis Novios; 5. Tinta Verde; 6. Me He Quedado Sin Tu Amor; 7. Mi Camino Y Tú; 8. La Canción De Las Muchachas; 9. Has Querido Olvidar; 10. El Último De Los Agentes Secretos	RCA Camden
1969	Dulce De Coco (Recorded as Gloria Gil)	1. Dulce De Coco; 2. Fue Por Ti; 3. Yes, Yes, Pero Goodbye; 4. Corazón No Llores; 5. Llévate La Llave; 6. La Coqueta; 7. En Mi Viejo San Juan; 8. Si No Quieres; 9. Yo Te Esperaré; 10. Un Amor Como Mi Amor	Oro Records
1971	Nació Para Cantar	1. Amor Y Más Amor; 2. Llorando Por Dentro; 3. Ahora; 4. El Último Verano; 5. Amor Baladí; 6. Nunca Me Dejes; 7. Ahora Que Soy Libre; 8. Nunca Mi Amor; 9. Para Siempre Tú Y Yo; 10. Voy A Guardar Mi Lamento; 11. Nos Volvimos A Encontrar	Columbia Records
1972	Te Voy A Enseñar A Querer	1. Y Resulta Que Te Quiero; 2. La Tierra Mía; 3. Sabor De Alegría; 4. Bésame Otra Vez; 5. Con Tu Amor; 6. La Vida Es Nuestra; 7. Como Las Violetas; 8. Y Llegó; 9. Tengo Miedo; 10. Te Voy A Enseñar A Querer; 11. Qué Bella Es La Vida	Columbia Records
1973	Libre Como Gaviota	1. Libre Como Gaviota; 2. Tú Eres Todo Para Mí; 3. Yo Por Permitirlo; 4. Ayúdame; 5. Buenas Noches Madrid; 6. Quiéreme Mucho; 7. Solamente Nuestro Amor; 8. No Te Buscaré; 9. Cuando Salga La Luna; 10. Hay Amor; 11. Para Qué Soñar	Columbia Records
1974	Yo Seguiré Cantando	1. Yo Seguiré Cantando; 2. Te Recordaré; 3. Te Deseo Amor; 4. Agradezco Al Mundo; 5. Cuando Te Quiero Besar; 6. El Valle Y El Volcán; 7. Dime Amor; 8. Cada Momento; 9. Hazme Creer; 10. Cuando Vuelva A Tu Lado; 11. Donde Quieras Tú	Columbia Records
1975	Manoella	1. El Río; 2. Errores Y Defectos; 3. Tu Recuerdo; 4. Márchate; 5. Tómame O Déjame; 6. Llévame Contigo; 7. Vete Ya; 8. Mi Primer Amor; 9. Pecados Nuevos; 10. Poeta Dónde Estás; 11. Cómo Te Amo	Columbia Records
1976	Abrázame	1. Abrázame; 2. Si Supieras; 3. Al Partir; 4. Amado Mío; 5. Encontré Algo En Mi Vida; 6. Bésame Mucho; 7. Qué Bello Día; 8. Él Y Yo; 9. No Te Beso Más; 10. Déjame Sola; 11. La Secretaria	Columbia Records
1977	Acaríciame	1. Acaríciame; 2. Mi Felicidad; 3. Cuando Amanezca Otra Vez; 4. Vivo De Recuerdos; 5. Flores Marchitas; 6. Mi Primer Beso; 7. Sí O No; 8. La Corriente; 9. Quién Compra Una Canción; 10. Buscando A Quien Amar; 11. Dame Un Beso Y Dime Adiós	Columbia Records
1978	Abrígame En Tu Piel	1. Abrígame En Tu Piel; 2. Tu Bienvenida; 3. Sembrador; 4. Cuando Te Hayas Ido; 5. Lo Hice Por Amor; 6. Pantomima; 7. Volver; 8. Cuando Entrego Mi Querer; 9. Voy A Escribirte Un Verso; 10. Siempre Más Y Más	Columbia Records
1979	Que Me Perdone Tu Señora	1. Que Me Perdone Tu Señora; 2. No Sé Cómo; 3. Triste; 4. No Me Quieres; 5. Lo Mismo Da; 6. Nuestro Primer Beso; 7. La Coqueta De Teresa; 8. Qué Alegría; 9. Por Nuestro Amor; 10. Quiero	Columbia Records
1980	Se Te Fue Viva La Paloma	1. Se Te Fue Viva La Paloma; 2. No Me Dejes Esperando; 3. Acabo De Nacer; 4. Sabes Una Cosa; 5. Qué Bonito Amanecer; 6. El Gorrión Y Yo; 7. Te Juro Que Andas Mal; 8. Buenos Días Amor; 9. Que Todo Vaya Bien; 10. Otra Vez	Columbia Records
1980	Ahora No, Ahora Sí Quiero	1. Ahora No; 2. Mi Corazón Me Pertenece; 3. Me Alejaré De Ti; 4. Te Vas Para Tu Casa; 5. No Hay Amor; 6. Ahora Sí Quiero; 7. Engáñame; 8. Gracias Por Amarme Tanto; 9. Alguien; 10. Hoy Que Hace Frío	Columbia Records
1981	A La Que Vive Contigo	1. A La Que Vive Contigo; 2. Para Qué Te Vas; 3. Señor; 4. Cuándo Vendrás; 5. Sospecho; 6. La Mitad De Mi Vida; 7. Como Cualquier Artista; 8. Olvida; 9. Otra Vez Amor; 10. Lo De Antes	Columbia Records
1982	Herida De Muerte	1. Mi Canto Eres Tú; 2. Bésame (Amor De Contrabando); 3. Rutina; 4. Igual Que Ayer; 5. A Ver Qué Siento; 6. Herida De Muerte; 7. Sé De Dónde Vienes; 8. Éxito Seguro; 9. Canciones De Ayer; 10. Ya Te Estoy Extrañando	Columbia Records
1983	Busca Tu Gaviota	1. Busca Tu Gaviota; 2. Te Amaré Vida Mía; 3. Tú Te Lo Pierdes; 4. Cuatro Primaveras; 5. Soy Magdalena; 6. Gorrión; 7. No Me Dejes Llorando; 8. Adiós Cariño; 9. Vendrán Palomas Negras; 10. Locuras Tengo Contigo	Columbia Records
1984	Acéptame Como Soy	1. Acéptame Como Soy; 2. Me Siento Sola; 3. Qué Te Has Creído; 4. Una Y Otra Vez; 5. Fíjate Que No; 6. Yo Daría La Vida; 7. Hoy Lloré Por Ti; 8. Demasiado Tarde; 9. Para Qué Te Vas; 10. Te Hubiera Conocido Un Poco Antes	Columbia Records
1985	Manoella Torres '85	1. Tú Nunca Me Has Querido; 2. Yo No Entiendo Al Amor; 3. Tiempo Perdido; 4. Déjame; 5. Te Aprovechas De Mí; 6. Dónde Estarás; 7. Creer En Ti; 8. A Mí Ya No; 9. Arráncate Mi Amor; 10. Donde Vaya	Columbia Records
1988	Quiero Empezar A Vivir	1. Estás Jugando De Amante; 2. Trátame Bien; 3. Llama Del Deseo; 4. Me He Enamorado De Él; 5. Ocúpame El Corazón; 6. Quiero Empezar A Vivir; 7. Soy Mujer; 8. México Sin Ti; 9. En La Autopista; 10. Todo En El Amor	Columbia Records
1990	Aquí Estoy	1. Y Qué Querías Tú; 2. No Me Dejes Sola; 3. Súbito; 4. Quiéreme Ahora; 5. Ay Cupido; 6. Mentiroso; 7. Yo Quiero Con Él; 8. A Tu Merced; 9. Qué Calor; 10. Mala Suerte	Peerless Records
1991	A Plenitud	1. Poquito A Poco; 2. Noche Azul; 3. Una Tonta De Tantas; 4. No Me Alcanza El Tiempo; 5. Soy Toda Una Mujer; 6. Cobarde; 7. Suele Pasar Así; 8. Enamórame Otra Vez; 9. Nadie Se Muere De Amor; 10. Volver A Comenzar	Peerless Records
1993	Renacer	1. Y Por Supuesto; 2. Huele A Peligro; 3. El Último Verano; 4. Me Perdonas; 5. A La Que Vive Contigo; 6. Un Bolero; 7. No Te He Robado Nada; 8. Cuando Pienso En Ti; 9. Acaríciame; 10. Yo Sé Que Volverás	Peerless Records
1996	Sensibilidad	1. Hazlo Por Mi Corazón; 2. Nunca Lo Sabré, Nunca Lo Sabrás; 3. Busca Un Amor; 4. Infidelidad; 5. Yo Quiero Ser Igual Que Tú; 6. He Venido A Pedirte Perdón; 7. Si Quieres; 8. Yo No Nací Para Amar; 9. Aunque Te Enamores; 10. Tenías Que Ser Tan Cruel	Peerless Records
1997	Mujeres	1. Bésame Mucho; 2. Mucho Corazón; 3. Qué Sabes Tú; 4. Mil Besos; 5. Compréndeme; 6. El Amor, Cosa Tan Rara; 7. Es Demasiado Tarde; 8. Alma Mía; 9. Como Tú; 10. Así; 11. Señora, Señora, Señora; 12. Bésame Y Olvídame	PolyGram Records
1998	Lo Mejor De Juan Gabriel (Antología Del Mariachi Vol. 4)	1. No Vale La Pena; 2. Sólo Sé Que Fue En Marzo; 3. El Noa Noa; 4. Querido; 5. Déjame Vivir; 6. Siempre En Mi Mente; 7. No Lastimes Más; 8. De Mi Enamórate; 9. Buenos Días Señor Sol; 10. No Me Vuelvo A Enamorar; 11. Caray; 12. Tú Sigues Siendo El Mismo	PolyGram Records
1998	Lo Mejor De Agustín Lara (Antología Del Mariachi Vol. 6)	1. Pobre De Mí; 2. Farolito; 3. Aquel Amor (With Mauro Calderón); 4. Amor De Mis Amores; 5. Limosna; 6. Concha Nacar	PolyGram Records
2000	Te Amo	1. Te Amo; 2. Como Las Violetas; 3. Tu Amor; 4. Acaríciame; 5. Calla; 6. El Último Verano; 7. Si Supieras; 8. Abrázame Y Bésame; 9. Que Me Perdone Tu Señora; 10. Errores Y Defectos; 11. Te Voy A Enseñar A Querer; 12. Valió La Pena Vivir; 13. A La Que Vive Contigo	IM Records
2000	Interpreta Canciones De Conchita Bulnes	1. Baja California Sur; 2. Enigma De Amor; 3. Cabo San Lucas; 4. Si Regresas A Mí; 5. California; 6. Soñando Te Amaré; 7. Vámonos Para Los Cabos; 8. Mi Soledad; 9. Etcétera, Etcétera; 10. Tus Mentiras	IM Records
2001	Javier Solís... De La Tierra Al Cielo	1. Esclavo Y Amo; 2. Y...; 3. En Mi Viejo San Juan; 4. Si Dios Me Quita La Vida; 5. He Sabido Que Te Amaba; 6. Me Recordarás; 7. Moliendo Café; 8. Échame A Mí La Culpa; 9. Una Limosna; 10. Qué Va; 11. Sombras... Nada Más; 12. Adelante; 13. Cenizas; 14. La Mentira (Se Te Olvida)	IM Records
2002	Mi Soledad	1. Mi Soledad; 2. Son Corazón; 3. Aquí Te Espero; 4. Me Voy A Navegar; 5. El Rosario De Mi Vida; 6. Libre Como Gaviota; 7. Todo Pasa; 8. Tras De ti 9. Junto A Mi Almohada; 10. Esperaré; 11. Soñando Estoy; 12. Ahora Que Soy Libre	IM Records
2004	Las Canciones Que Siempre Amé	1. La Gata Bajo La Lluvia; 2. Me Va A Extrañar; 3. Corazón Partío; 4. Todo Se Derrumbó Dentro De Mí; 5. Vives En Mí; 6. No Hace Falta; 7. Amainará; 8. Dormir Contigo; 9. Gracias A La Vida; 10. Estúpido; 11. Te Perdí; 12. Y Resulta Que Te Quiero; 13. Herida De Muerte	IM Records
2006	Homenaje A Los Panchos	1. Sin Un Amor; 2. Piel Canela; 3. Contigo; 4. Mi Último Fracaso; 5. Caminemos; 6. Rayito De Luna; 7. Sin Ti; 8. Celosa; 9. Sabor A Mí; 10. Fuego Bajo Tu Piel; 11. La Múcura; 12. No, No Y No; 13. No Me Quieras Tanto; 14. Los Dos; 15. Me Voy Pa'l Pueblo; 16. No, No Y No (With Carlos Cuevas)	IM Records

== See also ==
- List of Mexicans
- List of Puerto Ricans
