= Las Estrellas =

Mexican television network

- Logo used since 2017 (Note: The logo's style has been in use since 2016.)
- Type: Terrestrial television network
- Country: Mexico
- Broadcast area: Nationwide
- Transmitters: see below
- Headquarters: Avenida Chapultepec 28, Colonia Doctores, Cuauhtémoc, 06720 Mexico City, Mexico

Programming
- Picture format: 1080i HDTV (downscaled to 480i for the SD feed)

Ownership
- Owner: TelevisaUnivision

History
- Launched: 21 March 1951; 75 years ago
- Founder: Emilio Azcárraga Milmo
- Former names: Canal 2 (1951–1984); El Canal de las Estrellas (1985–2005); Canal de las Estrellas (2005–2016)

Links
- Website: www.lasestrellas.tv

Availability

Terrestrial
- Digital terrestrial television (Except Tijuana): Channel 2.1
- Digital terrestrial television (Reynosa): Channel 9.1
- Digital terrestrial television (Tijuana): Channel 19.1

Las Estrellas (Spanish for "The Stars", pronounced [las esˈtɾeʝas]) is a Mexican commercial broadcast television network owned by TelevisaUnivision. It began official broadcasts on March 21, 1951, and is distributed free-to-air across Mexico through affiliated stations, with XEW-TDT in Mexico City serving as its transmitter. It is Mexico's most-watched television network and TelevisaUnivision's flagship broadcast outlet in the country. The network is also the nation's second-oldest television broadcaster, tracing its roots to XEW-TV, after XHTV-TDT (now its sister channel N+ Foro).

Its programming is centered on telenovelas, game shows, comedy series, and newscasts. On weekends, the schedule expands to include films, reality shows, special events such as sports broadcasts and award ceremonies, as well as occasional simulcasts of major telenovela finales on Televisa Regional stations. The network also airs major Mexican soccer matches and, at times, boxing events. Much of its programming is also carried in the United States by Univision. Since 2003, a timeshift feed has been available nationwide on Sky México and Izzi Telecom, where it replaced Ponchivisión by mutual agreement.

== History ==
Las Estrellas originated from XEW-TV, which began broadcasting on 11 March 1951. The channel was a sister station to the legendary XEW-AM radio station, owned by Emilio Azcárraga Vidaurreta, which was also the owner of the newly launched channel. It was the second commercial TV channel to be established in Mexico City, after XHTV channel 4, owned by the Novedades newspaper. XEW-TV's first transmission was a live, play-by-play, outside broadcast of a Mexican League match, with XEW radio veteran Pedro Septién on commentary duties. Other than live sports broadcasts, XEW-TV initially broadcast films from the Golden Age of Mexican cinema, as its studios in Chapultepec 18 were still under construction. The studio complex, known as Televicentro, would be inaugurated in January 1952. Soon thereafter, the programming scope would be expanded to include live variety shows and television theatre showcases, in a style similar to XEW radio's similarly formatted shows.

XEW-TV would be a pioneer in Mexican television, and would establish many industry firsts. In 1962, the channel would become the flagship network of the newly merged Telesistema Mexicano, which also brought XHTV and XHGC under Azcárraga's hands, and, after merging with XHTM-TV and Televisión Independiente de México, many of these stations' programs would move to XEW-TV. As a result, XEW-TV rapidly grew and became the country's most watched TV network, a position which was undisputed for many years, as Televisa held a monopoly on commercial TV in Mexico, which even went into heavily influencing the political landscape in the country. As a result, by 1985, and in preparation for the 1986 FIFA World Cup (in which Televisa was the host broadcaster), XEW-TV was renamed El Canal de las Estrellas, in reference to the station's line-up of actors, comedians and presenters. This was further reinforced with the launch of an image campaign song, sung by Lucía Méndez, in 1988.

Before the TSM-TIM merger, XEW's network was carrying its telenovelas from 4:15pm to 7:45pm.

After the death of Emilio Azcárraga Milmo in 1997, El Canal de las Estrellas suffered a massive restructuring of its programming. The biggest moment of the restructuring came in 1998, when 24 Horas, the Jacobo Zabludovsky-anchored newscast, long a propaganda mouthpiece of the Mexican political regime, was canceled. The station's brand identity was also replaced with a new logo created by Pablo Rovalo. After a period of ratings turmoil, viewership stabilized, but the channel had to contend now with a surgent XHDF, freshly privatized and bought under the auspicies of TV Azteca.

After years of decline, particularly after 2012, as accusations of political bias in favor of then-President Enrique Peña Nieto began to hamper the broadcaster's credibility, in 2016, the decision was made to relaunch entirely the station's branding and programming. On 22 August 2016, XEW-TV was renamed as Las Estrellas, and introduced many changes to its programming schedule, including shorter and snappier telenovelas and news programming, as well as dropping many long-running programming in favour of programming oriented to a younger audience. The changes generated a big ratings decline; as a result, by 2017, much of the new programming was canceled and the prime time telenovelas and news programming were relocated to pre-relaunch timeslots and viewership stabilized, especially during the COVID-19 pandemic.

== Las Estrellas Internacional ==
Las Estrellas is available as a pay television network in Europe and Australia as Las Estrellas Europa and Las Estrellas Latinoamérica in Central and South America through Televisa Networks. Both feeds differ from the Las Estrellas programming, usually broadcasting shows weeks behind their original broadcast.

The European feed was known as Galavisión until 2005 and started broadcasting in late 1988. On October 15, 2005, the channel adopted El Canal de las Estrellas, as Galavisión was associated to old movies, outdated telenovelas and sports events broadcast with delay. The rebrand enabled the channel to get up-to-date with the Latin American feed. In January 2025, satellite distribution of the feed changed from Eutelsat 9B to Intelsat 35e.

In Canada, XEW-TDT and the Las Estrellas schedule is available in full on Western Canada Rogers Cable (limited to the Greater Toronto Area) and Bell Fibe TV as an eligible foreign service.

== Network logos ==
1951 logo

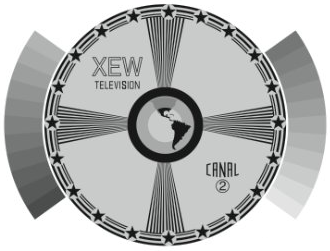
1952 logo

1968 logo

1988 logo

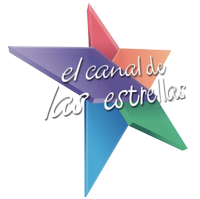
1993 logo

1997 logo

2007 logo

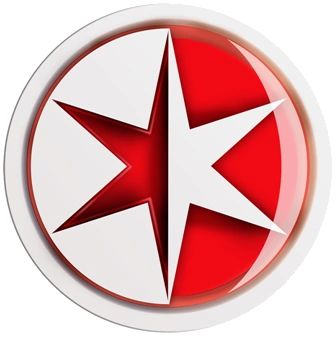
2014 logo

2016 logo

== Programming ==
Weekday programming in the afternoon and prime time consists of telenovelas. Las Estrellas airs sports programming and sports specials like the Olympic Games and the FIFA World Cup. Morning and afternoon programming consists of news, sports, talk shows, and variety shows. Night time programming is filled with a news program and Univision-produced shows. Examples of shows produced by Las Estrellas are Recuerda y Gana, Hoy, El Juego de las Estrellas, and Cuéntamelo ya. The network also produces and airs the Premios TVyNovelas, sponsored by the Televisa-owned magazine of the same name and considered the highest honor in the domestic Mexican television industry.

From 1973 until 2000, Televisa took part in the annual Ibero-American OTI Festival for twenty-seven editions representing Mexico. To select its entry to the international festival, the network organized a large-scale televised national competition with several phases, which was one of Canal 2's flagship programs each year. Televisa also staged the 3rd, 5th, 20th, and 28th editions of the OTI Festival in Acapulco, and the 10th and 13th editions in Mexico City. Televisa won the competition six times: in 1973 with "Qué alegre va María", written by Celia Bonfil and performed by Imelda Miller; in 1975 with "La felicidad", written by Felipe Gil and performed by Gualberto Castro; in 1985 with "El fandango aquí", written by Marcial Alejandro and performed by Eugenia León; in 1989 with "Una canción no es suficiente", written by Jesús Monárrez and performed by Analí; in 1990 with "Un bolero", written by Francisco Curiel and Pedro Alberto Cárdenas and performed by Carlos Cuevas; and in 1997 with "Se diga lo que se diga", written by Francisco Curiel and José Manuel Fernández and performed by Iridián.

== Repeaters ==
The following is a list of all full-time Las Estrellas repeaters:

RF	VC	Call sign	Location	ERP	Concessionaire
26	2	XHEBC-TDT	Ensenada	38 kW	Televimex
34	2	XHBM-TDT	Mexicali	180 kW	Televimex
22	19	XHUAA-TDT	Tijuana	200 kW	Televimex
27	2	XHSJT-TDT	San José del Cabo; Cabo San Lucas	30 kW; 27 kW	Televimex
30	2	XHCBC-TDT	Cd. Constitución	10 kW	Televimex
26	2	XHGWT-TDT	Guerrero Negro	30 kW	Televimex
28	2	XHLPT-TDT	La Paz	26 kW	Televimex
34	2	XHCPA-TDT	Campeche	28 kW	Televimex
22	2	XHCDC-TDT	Ciudad del Carmen	31 kW	Televimex
21	2	XHEFT-TDT	Escárcega	18 kW	Televimex
32	2	XHWVT-TDT	Tonalá; Arriaga	20 kW; 18 kW	Televimex
34	2	XHCIC-TDT	Cintalapa de Figueroa		Televimex
23	2	XHCMZ-TDT	Comitán de Dominguez	32 kW	Televimex
32	2	XHHUC-TDT	Huixtla	40 kW	Televimex
32	2	XHOCC-TDT	Ocosingo	39 kW	Televimex
16	2	XHSCC-TDT	San Cristobal de las Casas	30 kW	Televimex
23	2	XHAA-TDT	Tapachula	62 kW	Televimex
29	2	XHTUA-TDT	Tuxtla Gutiérrez	45 kW	Televimex
28	2	XHVAC-TDT	Venustiano Carranza	22 kW	Televimex
26	2	XHVFC-TDT	Villaflores	20 kW	Televimex
36	2	XHCHC-TDT	Cd. Camargo	24 kW	Televimex
46	2	XHCCH-TDT	Cd. Cuauhtémoc	26 kW	Televimex
23	2	XHDEH-TDT	Cd. Delicias	20 kW	Televimex
33	2	XHBU-TDT	Cd. Jiménez	11 kW	Televimex
29	2	XEPM-TDT	Cd. Juárez	50 kW	Televimex
29	2	XHMAC-TDT	Cd. Madera	14 kW	Televimex
24	2	XHFI-TDT	Chihuahua; Cd. Cuauhtémoc	47 kW; 26 kW	Televimex
26	2	XHHPT-TDT	Hidalgo del Parral	24 kW	Televimex
27	2	XHNCG-TDT	Nuevo Casas Grandes	34 kW	Televimex
15	2	XHOCH-TDT	Ojinaga	23 kW	Televimex
35	2	XHBVT-TDT	San Buenaventura	25 kW	Televimex
34	2	XHSAC-TDT	Santa Barbara	23 kW	Televimex
32	2	XEW-TDT	Mexico City (Pico Tres Padres, Mexico)	270 kW	Televimex
35	2	XHWDT-TDT	Allende	40 kW	Televimex
34	2	XHAMC-TDT	Ciudad Acuña	50 kW	Televimex
23	2	XHRDC-TDT	Nueva Rosita	42 kW	Televimex
35	2	XHMOT-TDT	Monclova	50 kW	Televimex
22	2	XHPAC-TDT	Parras de la Fuente	62 kW	Televimex
30	2	XHPNT-TDT	Piedras Negras	43 kW	Televimex
20	2	XHO-TDT	Torreón	150 kW	Televimex
16	2	XHBZ-TDT	Colima; Manzanillo; Cd. Guzmán, Jal.	54 kW; 30 kW; 15 kW	Televimex
23	2	XHTEC-TDT	Tecomán/Armería	33 kW	Televimex
21	2	XHDI-TDT	Durango; Santiago Papasquiaro, Dgo.	94 kW	Televimex
27	2	XHLGT-TDT	León; Guanajuato	180 kW; 20 kW	Televimex
22	2	XHACZ-TDT	Acapulco	15 kW	Televimex
20	2	XHCK-TDT	Chilpancingo	50 kW	Televimex
26	2	XHIGG-TDT	Iguala	43 kW	Televimex
34	2	XHTGG-TDT	Tecpan de Galeana	24 kW	Televimex
27	2	XHIZG-TDT	Ixtapa and Zihuatanejo	40 kW	Televimex
34	2	XHTWH-TDT	Tulancingo	45 kW	Televimex
36	2	XHATJ-TDT	Atotonilco El Alto	24 kW	Televimex
32	2	XHANT-TDT	Autlán de Navarro	43 kW	Televimex
24	2	XHGA-TDT	Guadalajara Metropolitan Area	150 kW	Televimex
25	2	XHLBU-TDT	La Barca	22 kW	Televimex
36	2	XHPVT-TDT	Puerto Vallarta	33 kW	Televimex
36	2	XHTM-TDT	Altzomoni; Tejupilco de Hidalgo; Taxco, Gro. Pachuca, Hgo. (RF 39); Cuernavaca, Mor. San Martín Texmelucan, Pue. Tlaxcala, Tlax.	236 kW; 20 kW; 21 kW; 8 kW; 45 kW; 20 kW; 30 kW	Televimex
19	2	XHTOL-TDT	Toluca/Jocotitlán	45 kW	Televimex
25	2	XHAPN-TDT	Apatzingán	47 kW	Televimex
21	2	XHCHM-TDT	Ciudad Hidalgo	14 kW	Televimex
30	2	XHLBT-TDT	Lazaro Cárdenas	25 kW	Televimex
31	2	XHLRM-TDT	Los Reyes	22 kW	Televimex
16	2	XHKW-TDT	Morelia	47.2 kW	Jose Humberto y Loucille Martínez Morales
30	2	XHURT-TDT	Cerro Burro, Mich.	338 kW	Televimex
14	2	XHSAM-TDT	Sahuayo de Morelos-Jiquilpan	20 kW	Televimex
29	2	XHZMT-TDT	Zamora	32 kW	Televimex
36	2	XHZIM-TDT	Zinapécuaro	30 kW	Televimex
25	2	XHZMM-TDT	Zitácuaro	10 kW	Televimex
32	2	XHACN-TDT	Acaponeta and Tecuala	15 kW	Televimex
23	2	XHIMN-TDT	Islas Marias	1.3 kW	Televimex
18	2	XHSEN-TDT	Santiago Ixcuintla	17 kW	Televimex
28	2	XHTEN-TDT	Tepic	55 kW	Televimex
23	2	XHX-TDT	Monterrey; Saltillo, Coah. Sabinas Hidalgo	200 kW; 45 kW; 4.8 kW	Televimex
31	2	XHHLO-TDT	Huajuapan de León; Tehuacán, Pue.	76 kW; 36 kW	Televimex
21	2	XHPAO-TDT	Cerro Palma Sola, Oax.	76 kW	Televimex
23	2	XHMIO-TDT	Miahuatlán de Porfirio Díaz	18 kW	Televimex
29	2	XHBN-TDT	Oaxaca	97 kW	Televimex
32	2	XHPNO-TDT	Pinotepa Nacional	46 kW	Televimex
36	2	XHPAT-TDT	Puerto Ángel	24 kW	Televimex
31	2	XHPET-TDT	Puerto Escondido	21 kW	Televimex
20	2	XHZAP-TDT	Zacatlán	20 kW	Televimex
32	2	XHZ-TDT	Querétaro (Cerro El Zamorano); Cerro El Cimatario; Guanajuato, Gto. Irapuato-Celaya, Gto. San Miguel de Allende, Gto.	180 kW; 10 kW; 20 kW; 50 kW; 65 kW	Televimex
21	2	XHCCN-TDT	Cancún; Playa del Carmen	60 kW; 20 kW	Televimex
27	2	XHCHF-TDT	Chetumal	28 kW	Televimex
30	2	XHCOQ-TDT	Cozumel	60 kW	Televimex
30	2	XHCDV-TDT	Ciudad Valles	18 kW	Televimex
29	2	XHMTS-TDT	Matehuala	27 kW	Televimex
31	2	XHSLA-TDT	San Luis Potosí	210 kW	Televimex
29	2	XHTAT-TDT	Tamazunchale	40 kW	Televimex
23	2	XHBT-TDT	Culiacán	155 kW	Televimex
25/30	2	XHBS-TDT	Los Mochis; Cd. Obregón, Son.(RF 30)	110 kW; 200 kW	Televimex
25	2	XHOW-TDT	Mazatlán	118 kW	Televimex
17	2	XHAPT-TDT	Agua Prieta	25 kW	Televimex
35	2	XHSVT-TDT	Caborca	37 kW	Televimex
34	2	XHCNS-TDT	Cananea	32 kW	Televimex
20	2	XHGST-TDT	Guaymas	46 kW	Televimex
23	2	XHHES-TDT	Hermosillo	100 kW	Televimex
21	2	XHMST-TDT	Magdalena de Kino	24 kW	Televimex
27	2	XHBF-TDT	Navojoa	65 kW	Televisora de Navojoa
17	2	XHNOS-TDT	Nogales	35 kW	Televimex
22	2	XHPDT-TDT	Puerto Peñasco	32 kW	Televimex
32	2	XHLRT-TDT	San Luis Río Colorado	55 kW	Televimex
27	2	XHFRT-TDT	Frontera	18 kW	Televimex
31	2	XHUBT-TDT	La Venta	3 kW	Televimex
30	2	XHTET-TDT	Tenosique; Palenque, Chis.	28 kW	Televimex
32	2	XHVIZ-TDT	Villahermosa	125 kW	Televimex
34	2	XHMBT-TDT	Ciudad Mante	27 kW	Televimex
31	2	XHTK-TDT	Ciudad Victoria	80 kW	Televimex
30	2	XHLUT-TDT	La Rosita-Villagrán	35 kW	Televimex
29	2	XHLAR-TDT	Nuevo Laredo	200 kW	Televimex
19	9	XERV-TDT	Reynosa	300 kW	Televisora de Occidente
28	2	XHTAM-TDT	Reynosa	265 kW	Televimex
25	2	XHSFT-TDT	San Fernando	15 kW	Televimex
32	2	XHSZT-TDT	Soto la Marina	20 kW	Televimex
17	2	XHGO-TDT	Tampico	180 kW	Televimex
18	2	XHCRT-TDT	Cerro Azul	28 kW	Televimex
24	2	XHCV-TDT	Coatzacoalcos	60 kW	Televimex
24	2	XHFM-TDT	Veracruz		Televisora de Occidente
17	2	XHAH-TDT	Las Lajas; Nogales; Orizaba	430 kW; 25 kW; 60 kW	Televimex
35	2	XHATV-TDT	San Andrés Tuxtla, Ver.	22 kW	Televimex
30	2	XHTP-TDT	Mérida	125 kW	Televisora Peninsular
32	2	XHVTT-TDT	Valladolid; Tizimín	60 kW; 28 kW	Televimex
22	2	XHJZT-TDT	Jalpa	25 kW	Televimex
23	2	XHNOZ-TDT	Nochistlan	32 kW	Televimex
18	2	XHSOZ-TDT	Sombrerete	32 kW	Televimex
25	2	XHTLZ-TDT	Tlaltenango; Calvillo, Ags.	22 kW; 17 kW	Televimex
22	2	XHVAZ-TDT	Valparaiso	22 kW	Televimex
16	2	XHBD-TDT	Zacatecas; Aguascalientes, Ags.	130 kW; 10 kW	Televimex
