= Roberto Cantoral =

Mexican composer, singer, musician (1935-2010)

- Born: Roberto Cantoral Garcia; 7 June 1935
- Origin: Ciudad Madero, Tamaulipas
- Died: 7 August 2010 (aged 75)
- Genres: Bolero, Latin music
- Occupations: Composer, singer, musician
- Instruments: Piano, guitar
- Years active: 1950–2010
- Label: Sony Discos
- Formerly of: Los Hermanos Cantoral; Los Tres Caballeros; Los Panchos; Los Hermanos Castro; Gualberto Castro; José José

Roberto Cantoral García (7 June 1935 – 7 August 2010) was a Mexican composer, singer and songwriter. He was known for composing a string of hit Mexican songs, including "El Triste", "Al Final", "La Barca" and "El Reloj" The Sociedad de Autores y Compositores de México (English: Society of Authors and Composers of Mexico) estimated that "La Barca" and "El Reloj" have been recorded over 1,000 times by other artists like Plácido Domingo, Gualberto Castro, José José, Luis Miguel, Joan Báez and Linda Ronstadt. In 2009, he won the Latin Grammy Trustees Award. Iconos, which was released by Marc Anthony in 2010, featured "El Triste".

== Early life ==
Roberto Cantoral Garcia was born on 7 June 1935 in Ciudad Madero, Tamaulipas. From an early age, he showed an ability for music and its composition. Cantoral moved to Mexico City to attend college but dropped out to become a band leader.

== Career ==
=== 1950–1960 ===
In 1950, Cantoral formed the Hermanos Cantoral (English: Cantoral Brothers) with Antonio Cantoral. The duo recorded "El preso número 9" (English: Prisoner Number 9) and "El crucifijo de piedra" (English: The Crucifix of Stone). The duo ended in 1954 with Antonio's death and Roberto formed Los Tres Caballeros (English: The Three Gentlemen) with Chamin Correa and Leonel Gálvez who performed during Mexico's era of romantic music and traveled to Japan, Argentina and the United States.

=== 1960–1980 ===
In 1960, Cantoral went solo and achieved international fame for "Al final", "Noche no te vayas", "Regálame esta noche", and "Yo lo comprendo". In 1970, he wrote the ballad "El Triste" for José José. As a songwriter, he won in 1972 the 1st Mexican national selection for the OTI Festival with the song "Yo no voy a la guerra", which was disqualified at the OTI Festival 1972 for its lyrics; and in 1974, he won the 3rd national selection with "Quijote", which represented Mexico in the OTI Festival 1974 placing tenth. Cantoral donated the proceeds from "Pobre Navidad" to worldwide children institutions such as UNICEF and his song, "Plegaria de paz" was broadcast "three consecutive years at the Vatican". Cantoral composed themes for telenovelas such as El derecho de nacer, Paloma, and Pacto de amor.

=== 1980–2000 ===
In 1982, Cantoral was elected as Sociedad de Autores y Compositores de México's Chairman of the Board for his first term.

== Awards ==
During his lifetime, Cantoral received many awards. He received medals of merit from Adolfo López Mateos and Josip Broz Tito. In 1969, Cantoral ganó la presea Diana Cazadora and premio Cuauhtémoc de Oro (English: Diana the Huntress award and Cuauhtémoc Gold prize). He won three gold records for "El Reloj", "La Barca" and "El Triste".

== Personal life ==
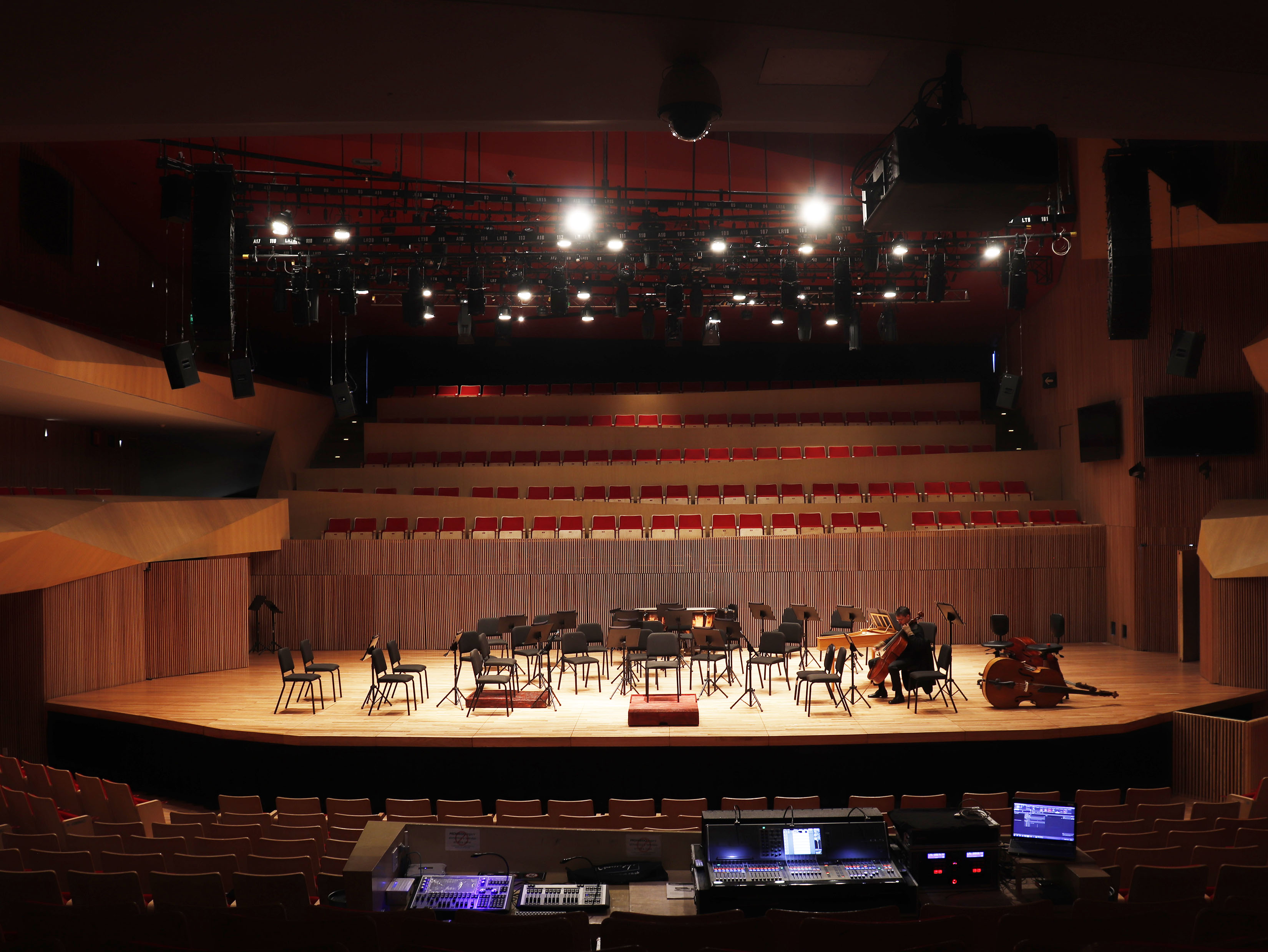
Roberto Cantoral Cultural Center in Mexico City was named after him.

Cantoral resided in Rancho Viejo, Texas, just across the border from Mexico. His home, which suffered a fire in 2006 but was renovated, features a large marble clock in honor of his song, El Reloj, and several statues.

Cantoral was married to Itatí Zucchi and was the father of Mexican actress Itatí Cantoral, the co-star of the Televisa television series Hasta Que El Dinero Nos Separe. Roberto Cantoral had three sons, Carlos, Roberto and José, with Zucchi.

== Death ==
In 2010, 75-year old Cantoral died after suffering a heart attack on a flight from Brownsville, Texas, to Ciudad de México. The plane made an emergency landing in Toluca, Mexico, where Cantoral was pronounced dead. His body was placed on public view at the Palacio de Bellas Artes in Mexico City. Cantoral's ashes were scattered in his hometown, Tampico, Tamaulipas

== Tribute ==
On June 7, 2021, Google celebrated his 85th birthday with a Google Doodle.
