= José María Napoleón =

Mexican singer and composer (born 1948)

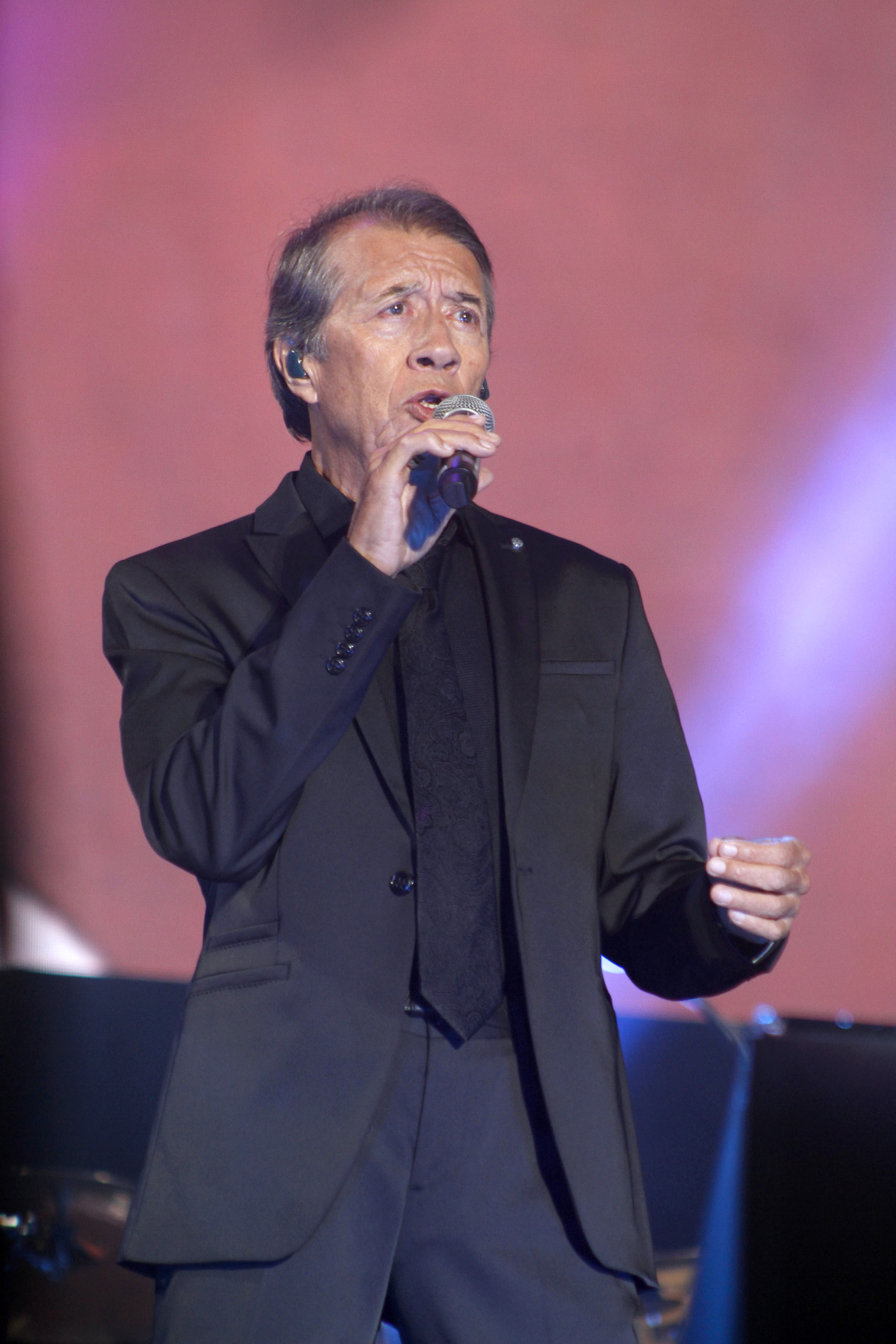

Background information
- Born: José María Napoleón Ruiz Narváez; 18 August 1948 (age 78); Aguascalientes, Mexico
- Genres: Latin pop
- Occupations: Singer, songwriter
- Instruments: Vocals, piano, guitar
- Years active: 1970–present

José María Napoleón Ruiz Narváez (born 18 August 1948) is a Mexican singer and composer.

== Life ==
He arrived from Aguascalientes to Mexico City in 1966. In 1977, he won the 6th Mexican national selection for the OTI Festival, and thus represented Mexico in the OTI Festival 1977 with the song "Hombre". Although he ended in the last place with no points, his career went on successfully, turning into a star in Mexico.

Vicente Fernández, Pepe Aguilar, Pedro Fernández, Yuri, Franck Pourcel, Plácido Domingo and José José, and Rosario De Alba have sung his compositions.

== Discography ==
- "El grillo" (1970)
- "De vez en vez" (1975)
- "Después de tanto" (1976)
- "Vive" (1976)
- "Pajarillo" (1977)
- "Hombre" (1977)
- "Un pedazo de madera" (1977)
- "Porque te quiero andaré" (1977)
- "Recuerdo apagado" (1978)
- "Lo que no fue no será" (1979)
- "Sin tu amor" (1979)
- "Eres" (1980)
- "Treinta años" (1980)
- "Ella se llamaba" (1980)
- "Mientras llueve" (1982)
- "Celos" (1982)
- "Nunca cambies" (1984)
- "Corazón, corazón" (1985)
- "Déjame Amarte De Nuevo" (1974)

== At the OTI Festival ==
Napoleón participated fourteen times in the Mexican national selection for the OTI Festival both as a singer and a songwriter; winning the 6th edition with his song "Hombre", and thus representing Mexico in the OTI Festival 1977, where he placed seventeenth.

Participations in the Mexican national selection for the OTI festival
Year	Song	Performer	Songwriter	Result
1972	"Canto"	José María Napoleón	José María Napoleón	Finalist
1972	"Fue"	Alejandra	José María Napoleón	Finalist
1974	"Los días de la vida"	Jorge Castro	José María Napoleón	4th in the final
1975	"Niño"	José María Napoleón	José María Napoleón	Eliminated in the qualifying rounds
1975	"Como cuando empezabas"	Mónica Ygual	José María Napoleón	Eliminated in the qualifying rounds
1976	"Anhelos"	José María Napoleón	José María Napoleón	Eliminated in the qualifying rounds
1976	"Vive"	José María Napoleón	José María Napoleón	4th in the final
1977	"Hombre"	José María Napoleón	José María Napoleón	1st in the final
1977	"Señor de edad"	José María Napoleón	José María Napoleón	Eliminated in the qualifying rounds
1980	"Pregúntate"	Juan Diego	José María Napoleón	Eliminated in the qualifying rounds
1981	"Deja"	Yuri	José María Napoleón	3rd in the final
1988	"Me están matando los celos"	José María Napoleón	José María Napoleón	Eliminated in the semi-final
1989	"Nunca será tarde"	José María Napoleón	José María Napoleón	Eliminated in the first qualifying round
1990	"Puede ser"	José María Napoleón	José María Napoleón	Finalist

Participations in the OTI festival
Year	Country	Song	Performer	Songwriter	Result
1977	Mexico	"Hombre"	José María Napoleón	José María Napoleón	17th
