= Los Hermanos Castro =

Singing quartet from Mexico City, Mexico

The Castro Brothers (Los Hermanos Castro) are a male singing quartet originated in Mexico City, Mexico in the mid-1950s.

== The original group: "Los Panchitos" ==
The original group was formed in the mid-1940s and was called "Los Panchitos." The group was made up of three brothers: Arturo, Jorge, and Javier Castro. Their ages ranged between 10 and 6 years old. Arturo played the piano, Jorge was the drummer, and Javier played the stand-up bass. In an interview with Gualberto Castro, c. 1982, Gualberto said: "Javier was just a baby when he sang and played in "Los Panchitos." My uncle stood him up on a chair so he could reach up to play the stand-up bass."

== The Formation of "Los Hermanos Castro" ==
When "Los Panchitos" were playing in restaurants and bars in Mexico City, Gualberto Castro, their first cousin, about 13 years old at the time, was auditioning in many venues to become a singer. Often Arturo would go to interviews with Gualberto as his piano player or musical accompaniment; the cousins knew they could sing well, but they were all having difficulty finding work. Gualberto's father, Antonio talked to his brother and they decided that Arturo, Jorge, Javier, and Gualberto should join together in a group. When Gualberto entered the group, "Los Panchitos" became "Los Hermanos Castro."

== Los Hermanos Castro ==
The original members of Los Hermanos Castro were Arturo Castro, piano, later keyboards, musical arranger, songwriter, and vocals; Javier Castro, vocals, stand-up bass, later electric bass, (Javier is father of Mexican actress Daniela Castro); Jorge Castro, tenor vocals, rhythms; and Gualberto Castro tenor countertenor. From humble beginnings, Los Hermanos Castro sang in Mexico City nightclubs, bars, theaters until a New York City agent discovered the group and booked then for work in New York City i.e., The Copacabana.

== Success ==
The group's four-part harmony set within the traditional Mexican trio style "plus one" that echoed the Mariachi sound developed a newness in music that set the group apart from their modern counterparts. The unusual blend of Jorge's tenor with Gualberto's tenor – countertenor voices blended with the deeper voices of Arturo and Javier voices played in Bossa nova, Samba and Jazz styles, were the reason the group was continually contracted in many Lounges throughout the United States. In the mid-1960 the group was booked into night clubs and lounges in Las Vegas, Nevada. They performed with Paul Anka, Judy Garland, and many entertainers including featured in the French production show Casino de Paris at the Dunes, Las Vegas, produced by Frederick Apcar.

The group also appeared in Cuba, Spain, Puerto Rico, Central America, Argentina. Los Hermanos Castro sang on television shows such as The Judy Garland Show. Many of the songs the group performed were written by Arturo. Their single "Un Hombre y Una Mujer" reached the number three position on the Puerto Rico singles chart in June 1967. In 1971 they were Brazilian Festival winners.

== Group reorganizes ==
The group returned to their native Mexico in the late 1970s. At that time Jorge Castro left the group to pursue a solo career. Benito Castro, son of the late Arturo Castro a.k.a. "el Bigoton Castro", a well known Mexican comedian, Benito cousin to Arturo, Javier and Gualberto Castro, entered the group.

== Presently ==
Currently, The Hermanos Castro continue to perform in Mexico City, Mexico.
