= Amparo Rubín =

Mexican singer and composer (1955–2024)

- Born: María Amparo Rubín Tagle; 24 March 1955; Puebla, Mexico
- Died: 6 January 2024 (aged 68)
- Occupations: Musician, composer, singer, songwriter

María Amparo Rubín Tagle (24 March 1955 – 6 January 2024) was a Mexican singer and composer.

== Biography ==
Amparo Rubín was born to José Rubín and Ofelia Tagle in the city of Puebla on 24 March 1955. Aged just 11, she composed her first song, En la arena, which was later performed and recorded by Lupita D'Alessio.

In Puebla, she attended her first semesters in education studying communication. She studied Spanish literature for three years and took part in literature and philosophy workshops as well as learning to play the guitar. She moved to Mexico City to formally begin her career, which was a quick success with songs like Peligro, performed by Olga María of Flans in 1991 for their album Adiós and by Yuridia in 2005, and Herida de muerte, popularized by Manoella Torres. Rubín settled in Spain for five years, making presentations and recitals in nightclubs in several Spanish cities. In addition to her work as a singer and composer, Rubín delved into musical and theatrical workshops. She developed a method in soap operas wherein each character in the story had their own leitmotif, and the telenovela Vivir un poco would be the first to use this method.

Rubín died on 6 January 2024, at the age of 68.

== Discography ==
=== Television ===
- Abandonada (1985)
- Vivir un poco (1985)
- Esperándote (1985)
- Marionetas (1986)
- Cicatrices del alma (1986)
- La casa al final de la calle (1989)
- Luz y sombra (1989)
- Días sin luna (1990)
- El abuelo y yo (1992)
- Bajo un mismo rostro (1995)
- Cañaveral de pasiones (1996)
- El secreto de Alejandra (1997)
- Camila (1998)
