= Benito Castro =

Mexican musician (1946–2023)

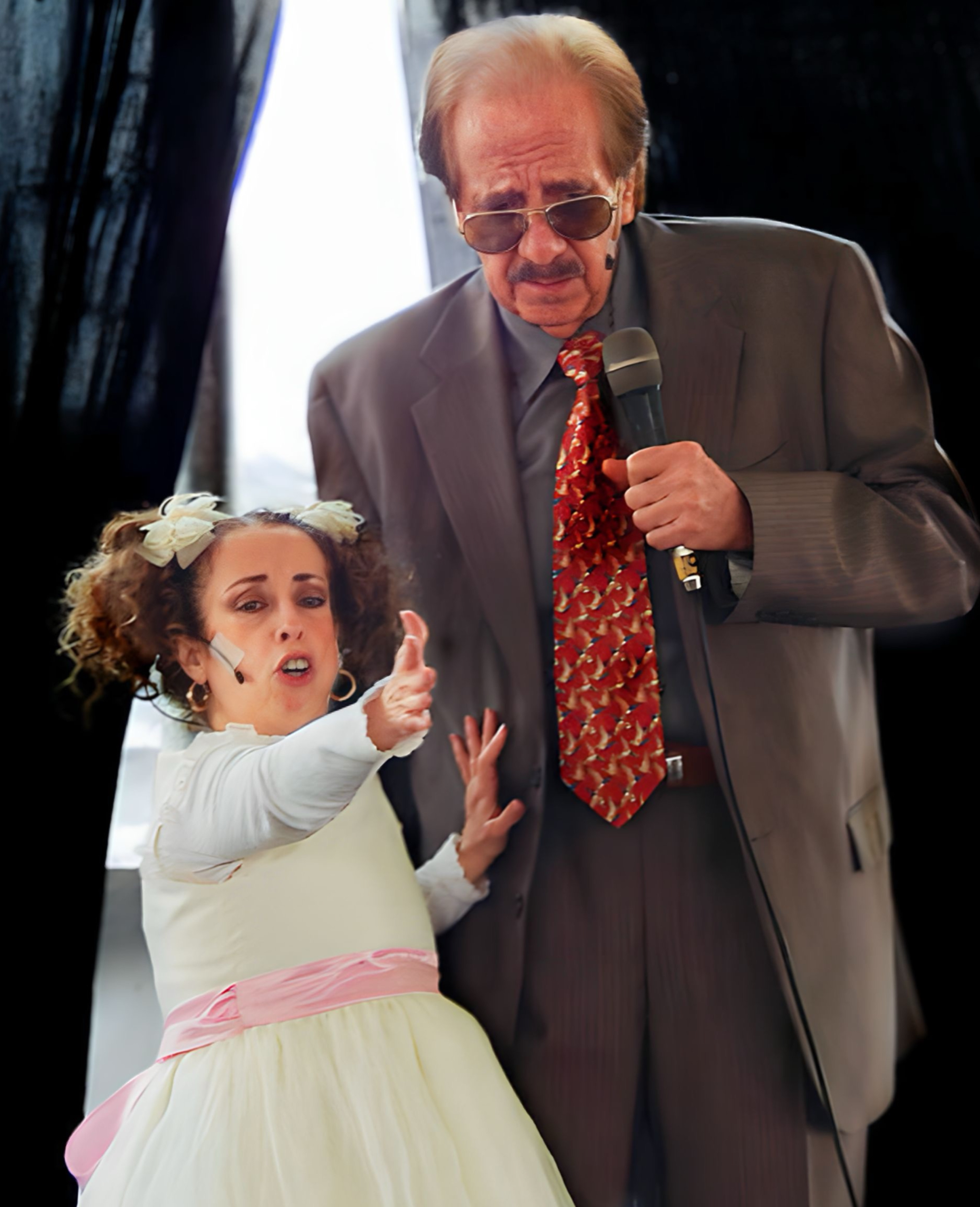
- Castro (right) with María Elena Saldaña in 2014
- Born: Arturo Castro Hernández; 5 June 1946; Mexico City, Mexico
- Died: 11 September 2023 (aged 77); Mexico City, Mexico
- Occupations: Musician; actor; comedian
- Spouses: Karen Kaczmarczyk (m. 1974; div. 2008): Deborah Ochoa
- Children: 3

Arturo "Benito" Castro Hernández (5 June 1946 – 11 September 2023) was a Mexican musician, actor, and comedian. He was a member of Los Hermanos Castro (The Castro Brothers), a male singing quartet.

== Early life ==
Castro was born to Arturo Castro and Rosa Hernandez de Castro. He has two sisters. His first cousin is Gualberto Castro, who was one of the original members of Los Hermanos Castro. His third cousin is actress and singer Daniela Castro.

== Los Hermanos Castro ==
As a teenager, Benito joined his cousin's musical group, Los Hermanos Castro. The original group started in Mexico City during the late 1950s with three brothers, Arturo, Javier, and Jorge Castro. A few years later, their first cousin, Gualberto Castro entered the group. The group enjoyed a great deal of success throughout the United States, Europe, and South America. Benito joined the group while they were performing under a long-term contract in Las Vegas. This made it possible for one of the Castros to take time off, when needed. Benito sang harmony and played guitar, but he also gave the group a new "zing" with his on-stage antics and comedy. His personality gave the group a new dimension. According to Benito, he "fell in love with a dancer in a show in Las Vegas," they married, and he became a "father at a young age."

When Los Hermanos Castro returned to Mexico, Castro continued to play gigs with Los Hermanos Castro, but also formed a musical duo with Kiko Campos. "Benito and Kiko" played in nightclubs throughout Mexico, recorded albums, and still performed together in nightclubs and concerts when Benito was not performing with Los Hermanos Castro.

== Television ==
Benito created the personality "Kin Kin from Acapulco" for the Mexican television show La Carabina de Ambrosio from 1979 to 1983. His comedy skits portraying a sun-tanned, raggedy cut-off jean, flip-flop-wearing beach bum in Acapulco were a take-off of Bob Denver's role on "Gilligan's Island." His ability to imitate and mimic others like Bob Denver, politicians, and singers opened the door for Benito to participate in another Mexican television show called "La Ensalada de Locos" (Crazy People Salad). Here, he outrageously imitated people in the public eye and poked fun at their peculiarities so much that the show was removed from television. Benito had a working relationship with the radio and television personality Paco Stanley and "how terrible it was for him to learn of the death of his friend."

Later in the 1980s, Castro wrote the theme for the television series Anabel, and continued to appear in other television series. He first teamed with María Elena Saldaña on Paco Stanley's Andale! in 1993, creating the character "El Papiringo." His comedy skits portraying him as the father of Saldana's "La Güereja" character led to two television series, La Güereja y algo más and La Güereja de mi vida, which ended in 2001.

Despite the death of Stanley and the departures of Saldana and Anabel Ferreira (Ferreira returned to Televisa in 2008), Castro continued to appear in other Televisa-produced series.

== Death ==
Benito Castro died from injuries sustained from falling down the stairs of his home on 11 September 2023, at the age of 77.

== Credits in film, and television ==
List of film and television credits,
Year	Title	Role
2014	Como dice el dicho (TV Series)	Abuelo
2011	Su Sombra(Movie)	Father
2009	Adictos (TV Series)	
2006	Chiquitq Bum (TV Series)	
2004	Cancionera (TV Series)	
2002	Asi Son Ellas (TV Series)	Roque Del Fino
2001	Güereja de Mi Vida (TV Series)	Benito "Papiringo" Castro
2000	Siempre te Amare (TV Series)	
1998	La Güereja y Algo Más (Movie)	
1995	La Sangre de los Inocentes (Movie)	Benito
1984	Alegría de Mediodia (TV Series)	
1979	La Criada Maravilla (Movie)	
