= Roberto Jordán =

Mexican singer (born 1943)

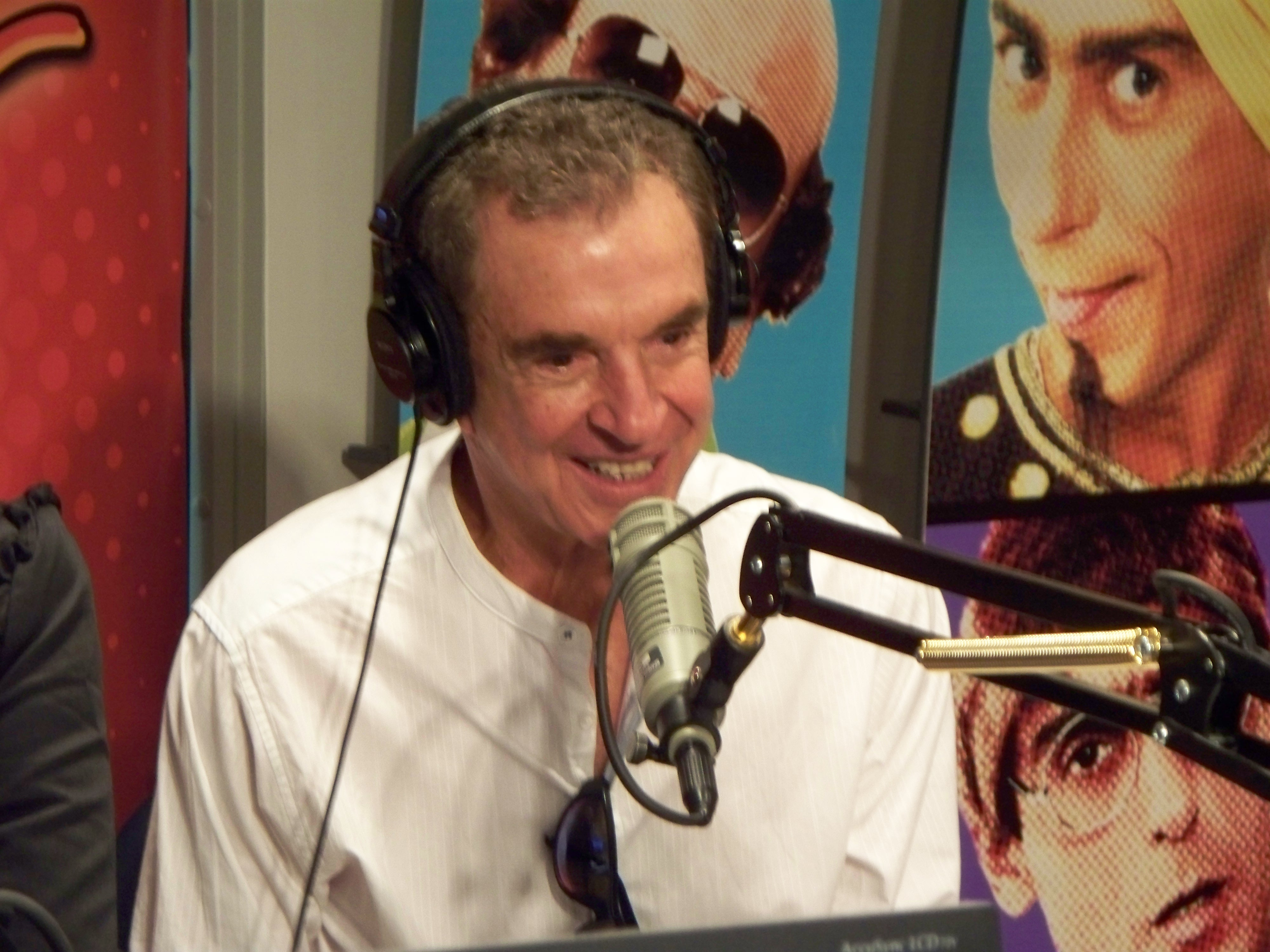
- Jordán in 2011

Background information
- Born: Roberto Pérez Flores; February 20, 1943 (age 83)
- Origin: Los Mochis, Sinaloa, Mexico
- Genres: Mexican rock, Bubblegum pop
- Occupations: Singer, songwriter
- Instrument: Singer
- Years active: 1966–present

Roberto Jordán (Spanish pronunciation: [roˈβeɾto xoɾˈðan]) (born February 20, 1943, in Los Mochis, Sinaloa, Mexico) is a popular singer whose heyday occurred during Mexico's nueva ola (new wave) of music in the late 1960s and early 1970s. Many of his songs were covers of English-language rock and pop songs, with arrangements provided by music teachers and producers Enrique Okamura and Eduardo Magallanes. Jordán popularized several Bubblegum rock songs among youth in the Spanish-speaking world, singing songs by the 1910 Fruitgum Company, the Ohio Express and The Turtles as well as introducing the repertoire of singer-songwriters like Neil Diamond and Joe South.

Jordán left the stage for a number of years to pursue business and sports. In the mid-1980s, he returned to performing and even recorded a new version of his onetime hit Hazme una señal (a cover version of Brenton Wood's Gimme Little Sign). He also performed at a reunion concert with original Mexican rock acts such as Los Rockin' Devils, Los Teen Tops and Los Hermanos Carrión in 2006.

== Discography (partial) ==
- 1968 – Hazme Una Señal, RCA Victor
- 1968 – 1,2,3 Detente!, RCA Victor
- 1970 – Castillos de Algodón, RCA Victor
- 1999 – Roberto Jordán (best-of compilation), Tepito Records

== Videos ==
- Roberto Jordán – Por ser como eres on YouTube
