= Gualberto Castro =

Mexican musical artist (1934–2019)

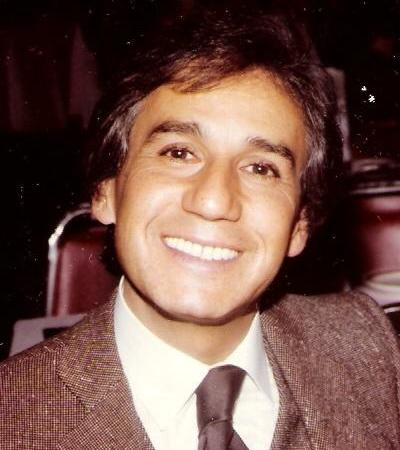
- Gualberto Castro in Las Vegas, c. 1981
- Born: Gualberto Antonio Castro Levario; 12 July 1934; Mexico City, Mexico
- Died: 27 June 2019 (aged 84); Mexico City, Mexico
- Other name: Guales
- Spouses: Altia Michel (m. 1954–1959) Suzanna J. Edwards (m. 1962; div. 1968) Suzanna J. Edwards (m. 1970–1973) Mariana Castro (m. 1979–1984) Maria Alejandra Walliser (m. 1986–2003) Alexis Cordova (m. 2004–2006): Gundy Becker
- Children: Altia Castro Michel
- Musical career
- Formerly of: Los Hermanos Castro

Gualberto Antonio Castro Levario (12 July 1934 – 27 June 2019) was a Mexican singer, actor and television presenter.

Castro was best known for singing with Los Hermanos Castro (aka "The Brothers Castro"), for his portrayal of Tony in the 1977 Mexican production of West Side Story, and for hosting the television program La Carabina de Ambrosio.

== Early life ==
Born in Mexico City, Castro began singing at an early age. He and his mother Julieta, father Antonio, and sister Julieta Jr. lived in Colonia Guerrero, Mexico City, Mexico; a singing teacher, Alejandro Algara, lived in the same building. "My father studied singing with the Algara; my father had a superior tenor voice", said Castro. "In those days, opera was what was studied, but I chose romantic ballads because it was what my father sang and I began listening to his music very early in life." Although Castro's father did not sing professionally, he wrote some of Castro's songs that Castro recorded on his hit album Qué mal amada estás, such as "Vanidosa". Even though Castro wanted to sing, he could not find a job as a singer. He began his artistic career as a backup dancer when he was 14 years old in the Teatro Blanquita, located in downtown Mexico City. Castro's first cousins, Arturo, Javier and Jorge Castro, had developed a singing group called Los Hermanos Castro ("The Castro Brothers"). They invited Castro to join as a countertenor voice to harmonize with Jorge's superb tenor voice. The group sang in nightclubs and bars in Mexico City. An agent from New York heard the boys and contracted them to sing in New York City. Gualberto related: "When we got the contract to sing in New York, we thought we had become millionaires." However, they discovered that living in New York was very expensive. "We were so poor", said Gualberto, "that the four of us slept in one bed. Two of us slept with our heads at the foot of the bed and the other two of us slept with our heads at the head of the bed." In time, the Castro Brothers gained fame in the United States and began to tour the country. The quartet met with great success in Las Vegas, Nevada, in more ways than one. Gualberto said: "We worked in a lounge that had showgirls. The girls would talk to us before they went on the stage, but they had nothing on their chests. We thought Las Vegas was wonderful."

== Music ==
The Castro Brothers were famous for their four-part harmony with Gualberto’s countertenor / tenor voice often singing lead. Later, their first cousin, Benito Castro entered the group as a musician and a singer, but he gradually turned into a comedian like his late father, Arturo "Bigotón" Castro. They recorded numerous albums; one of their most famous hits, "Yo sin ti", written and arranged by Arturo Castro, became a popular song throughout Mexico and South America. CBS later released a composite CD / DVD of Los Hermanos Castros singing and performing live filmed and recorded during the 1960s.

When returning to Mexico, Los Hermanos Castro decided to go their separate ways, each successfully developing a career in music. Gualberto embarked on a solo singing career, recording one album a year and appearing in numerous night clubs, theaters, movies and television; he was a long time emcee for La Carabina de Ambrosio, a popular weekly television show during the early 1980s that co-starred the magician Beto "El Boticario" and dancer Gina Montes. Castro appeared on television, theaters and nightclubs with numerous entertainers such as Judy Garland, Paul Anka, Verónica Castro (no relation) and Laura Zapata.

In 1973, Castro won the 2nd Mexican national selection for the OTI Festival with the song "La canción del hombre" written by Felipe Gil, which later became ineligible for the international competition. In 1975, he won again the 4th national selection with the song "La felicidad", also written by Felipe Gil, and went on to represent Mexico in the OTI Festival 1975, which he also won. He received numerous awards and honors from Mexico, Argentina, Peru, Colombia, and the United States, including a lifetime award for singing and entertaining from the Accociacion Nacional de Actores (ANDA). On August 22, 2007, Gualberto celebrated 60 years as a singer and entertainer.

== Controversial album cover ==
In 1980, Gualberto Castro's song "Qué mal amada estás" by Roberto Cantoral came out in an album with the same name as the song. Gualberto and his wife designed the album cover with himself lying down between the shapely legs of dancers who stood in French-cut leotards above him. The legs belonged to his wife, sister-in-law, and a friend of the family, who were all dancers. The cover design was inspired by the publicity for Mickey Rooney's stage production Sugar Babies. The album cover caused scandal in the conservative Mexican record market; the album sold out quickly and the lead song "Qué mal amada estás" became a big hit for Gualberto. Ten years later, CBS, the publisher of the album changed the album cover to a generic photograph without Gualberto's image.

== Gualberto Castro v. NFL ==
In 2010, the NFL used Gualberto Castro's signature song "La Felicidad" for a commercial promoting American football to Spanish-speaking audiences. The NFL did not need permission from Castro to use the song, but the NFL neglected to pay Castro royalties for the use of the song.

== Personal life ==
A longtime vegetarian, Gualberto also followed a macrobiotic diet. He maintained a strict lifestyle that entailed drinking no alcoholic beverages or coffee, meditation, exercise and yoga. In a television interview, interviewer Mario Pintor asked Gualberto Castro what he did to keep his singing voice intact after so many years of performances. Gualberto answered: "It is not magic to keep one's voice, but with discipline. If you are a person who stays out late at night, drinks alcohol, smokes cigarettes, and carouses around, well, your singing voice will change tone, perhaps get graveled, and finally, you can't sing. I use the paradigm of Tito Guízar: he was 90 years old and he was still singing in the same key as when he was young. At 90 years old he still could sing opera because he was a disciplined person. The same with Don Pedro Vargas, both of them died singing."

Arturo Castro, affectionately known as "El Bigotón", an actor, comedian and night-club entertainer, was Gualberto's uncle. Daniela Castro, a popular Mexican TV actress, was Gualberto's second cousin.

Gualberto Castro was married six times, firstly to Altia Michel from 1954 until 1959, to Susana Edwards from 1962 until 1968, to Mariana Castro from 1979 until 1984, to Alejandra Walliser from 1986 until 2003, to Alexis Córdova from 2004 until 2006 and finally to Gudrun Becker until his death. He died in Zona Rosa, Mexico City on 27 June 2019, due to health complications arising from treatment for bladder cancer, among which was a pulmonary infection.
