= Manolo Muñoz =

Mexican singer and actor (1941–2000)

Manolo Muñoz (20 April 1941 –29 October 2000) was a Mexican singer and actor who was famous for an interpretation of the song "Speedy Gonzales" in the 1960s. He was also one of the first soloists in Mexico to sing a style that later became popular with artists like José José, Víctor Yturbe, and Luis Miguel.

Muñoz, who was born Manuel Muñoz Velasco in La Barca, Jalisco, was also referred to as El Flaco Muñoz, El Esqueleto and El Hombre de la Llamarada. His career began in 1959; he played a significant role in the history of Mexican rock. He is one of early Mexican rock's most prolific singers, both as the singer of Los Gibson Boys and as a solo artist.

He was planning a tour at the time of his death.
