= Yoshio (singer) =

Mexican singer (1949–2020)

- Born: Gustavo Nakatani Ávila; October 15, 1949; Mexico City, Mexico
- Died: May 13, 2020 (aged 70) Mexico City, Mexico
- Genres: Ballad, pop
- Occupation: Singer

Gustavo Nakatani Ávila (15 October 1949 – 13 May 2020), known professionally as Yoshio, was a Mexican singer of Japanese descent whose greatest hits were in the 1970s and 1980s. He represented Mexico in the OTI Festival 1981 placing third.

== Biography ==
Yoshio was the son of Yoshigei Nakatani Moriguchi, the Japanese-born entrepreneur and creator of Japanese-style peanuts in Mexico, and Mexican-born wife Ema Ávila Espinoza, and the youngest of 8 siblings, including artist Carlos Nakatani. As a young child, he was given the nickname of "Yoshio" by his father, after not only showing his talent as a singer, but also because of his big heart and passion for life. Soon after, the family started calling Gustavo by the nickname. Yoshio means noble man in Japanese. Yoshio continued helping out in his father's business, at the same time as he was training his voice for singing.

== Career ==
In 1973, Yoshio participated in the Mexican national selection for the OTI Festival performing "Quién pudiera dormir como duerme un niño" with a group he formed to exclusively sing the songs he had written. He participated as a solo artist in the national selection in 1977 with the song "Tu primera vez", not qualifying for the final; in 1978 with the song "Dime por qué", reaching the final; and in 1979 with the song "Estreno", placing fourth in the final and receiving the "Best Male Performer Award". He participated again in 1981 with "Lo que pasó, pasó", written by Felipe Gil, winning the national final, and representing Mexico in the OTI Festival 1981 where he placed third. He also participated in the Yamaha Music Festival at the Tokyo Nippon Budokan in October 1982, with the song "Enséñame a querer" written by Sonia Rivas and Mario Molina Montes, who won the Silver medal, with Yoshio winning the "Best Singing Performance Award".

Among his other hits are the songs "Samurai" (for which he received the nickname of "Samurai de la Canción", nickname shared with singer Pedro Vargas, who was given the name before), "Reina de Corazones" and "A Mi Manera" (a Spanish-language translation of "My Way"). Yoshio recorded over 30 albums, including “Demasiado Tarde” (1978), “Yoshio” (1979), “Ámame” (1980), “Lo que pasó, pasó” (1981), “Yoshio” (1982), “Reina de corazones” (1984), “Samurai” (1985), “Tú ni te imaginas” (1990), “Soy puro corazón” (1991), “20 grandes éxitos” (2001), “Sentimientos de México” (2002), “Las canciones de mi vida” (2002), “Mientras de mí te olvidas. Yoshio interpreta a Martín Urieta” (2006), “La gran colección del 60 aniversario CBS” (2008), “Lo mejor de Yoshio” (2013), “Amo la vida” (2015), “Lo maravi Yoshio de Manzanero” (2016), “Lo maravi Yoshio de Álvaro Carrillo” (2017), and “Bohemios de la OTI”.

In 2015, Yoshio celebrated 45 years of career in the Lunario del Auditorio, an alternate stage with capacity for around 1000 people.

As an actor, Yoshio participated in Silvia Pinal's series "Mujer, Casos de la Vida Real"; on La hora marcada, acting with María Rojo; co-starred with Ana Martin on the telenovela "El Pecado de Oyuki" (1988); on "El cristal empañado" (1989); on "Una luz en el camino" (1998), and on "Pasión" (2007, in a role written by Carla Estradaespecially for him.

As a program host, he hosted the MVS show “Ahora toca”, broadcast in Mexico and the United States; and on Radio Capital “Soy bohemio y qué”.

== Personal life ==
=== COVID diagnosis and death ===
On 30 April 2020, he was admitted at the Xoco hospital, where he was at first diagnosed with salmonellosis, and later with COVID-19. He died in the hospital on 13 May, at age 70 during the COVID-19 pandemic in Mexico. It was later revealed that he contracted the virus in the hospital; his remains were cremated.

== See also ==
- Japanese community of Mexico City
