= Felicia Garza =

Mexican-American songwriter, singer and actress (born 1941)

Felipe Gil
- Born: Felipe Bojalil Garza; 7 September 1941; San Antonio, Texas
- Other name: Felicia Garza
- Occupation: Singer-songwriter
- Parents: Felipe Gil; Eva Garza

Felipe Bojalil Garza (born 7 September 1941, in San Antonio, Texas), better known as Felipe Gil, is a Mexican-American songwriter, musician, singer, and actor. Starting his show-business career in 1961, Gil participated in movies and had a successful singing career that took him to places as far from Mexico and the United States as Argentina, where he lived at for two years from 1964 to 1966. In 2016, at the age of 74, Gil announced that he was transgender, taking the name of Felicia Garza. In 2025, Felicia Garza "died", as told to Argentinian journalist Maximiliano Lumbia, with Gil returning to his former male self.

== Early life ==
Gil was born as Felipe Bojalil Garza in San Antonio, Texas, the son of singer Felipe Gil (Felipe Bojalil Gil) and of bolero singer Eva Garza, and nephew of musicians Alfredo "El güero" Gil, Chucho Martínez Gil and Carlos and Pablo Martinez Gil (Hermanos Martínez Gil). When his mother was pregnant with him, she moved to San Antonio, Texas from New York City, so she could give birth to her child there, returning to New York when he was six months old.

Gil has declared that he had a difficult relationship with his father, who was usually away due to his tours and his lifestyle as a famous singer. Gil self-identified as female from a young age and, at 4 years old, he wore his mother's clothes, but his father saw him and beat him up, which caused his mother to make him promise that from then on, Gil would try to look more like his father instead. When he was 11, his mother took Felipe Jr. and his sister Corina to Mexico City, because Eva Garza was under contract with the XEW radio station. His parents soon divorced.

As a kid, Gil dreamed about becoming a mathematical physicist in order to build in the future the many spaceships he had imagined. When he read The Little Prince by author Antoine de Saint-Exupéry, Gil began writing verses and poems dedicated to the universe, man and God. His love of music, even though he was part of a musical family, was born when he became part of a choir at age 15, in a church in New York. While he was there, Gil's father died of asfixia, after the bed he was sleeping on caught on fire from a cigarrette Gil Sr. had on his hand. His father's death affected him profoundly.

Gil continued struggling with his identity all his life. He played on an American football team, and practiced boxing, hoping that the experience would shape his inner-self into the man that he thought those around him wanted him to be; but he kept suffering.

== Musical career ==
Having become a gospel choir singer, Gil launched a musical career in 1961, using the pseudonym "Fabricio". Gil was known artistically as Fabricio from 1961 to 1967, when he began performing as Felipe Gil. He released albums from 1967 to 2009 using the name Felipe Gil. He released, according to Discogs.com, 12 albums and singles, including two singles for Capitol Records, (1969's "Que Te Pasa, Vida Mia?" and 1971's "Quiero Ser", not to be confused with Menudo's 1981 album and song of the same name).

During this time, he reached teen idol status in Mexico, additionally launching an acting career. The movies he starred in were named "Buenos Dias, Acapulco" ("Good Morning, Acapulco") and "Baila, Mi Amor" ("Dance, my Love"). His fame reached Argentina, where he moved to, living there from 1964 to 1966, and hosting a television show named "La Hora Ye Ye" ("The Ye Ye Hour").

In 1967, he joined a musical comedy television show named Cómicos y Canciones, alongside others such as Capulina and Chespirito. The show aired until 1969.

In 1966, his mother died in Tucson, Arizona, stricken by pneumonia during one of his mother's tours.

=== OTI Festival and other festivals ===
Gil won the Mexican national selection for the OTI Festival three times as a composer: in 1973 with "La canción del hombre" sung by Gualberto Castro, in 1975 with "La felicidad" also sung by Gualberto Castro, and in 1981 with "Lo que pasó, pasó" sung by Yoshio. "La canción del hombre" could not represent Mexico in the OTI Festival 1973 since it had been released before the permitted date, but "La felicidad" represented Mexico in the OTI Festival 1975 winning the festival, and "Lo que pasó, pasó" represented Mexico in the OTI Festival 1981 placing third.

In 1975, he also won the Festival Internacional de la Voz y la Cancion de Puerto Rico with the song "El río" sung by Manoella Torres.

== Later life ==
In 2016, he came out as transgender. He announced that, due to his advanced age, he was not going to go through sexual reassignment surgery but live out as a woman instead. "I haven't used anything except hormonal replacement therapy, I'm not going to change entirely and become a transsexual, which is different from transgender; I am a man and a woman at the same time", he declared to the press.

His family had a hard time accepting his new identity; his nephew Marcos Valdés (son of comedian Manuel Valdés and of Gil's sister Corina) took on social media to declare his disapproval of his uncle's transgenderism by declaring that "I keep seeing my uncle as my uncle. Do his daughters see him as their father or their mother? (Do I) see him as an uncle or aunt? He is my uncle, I love and admire him. I adore and respect him. Many say he looks better as a woman than he did as a man. (I hope everything) goes well for my uncle".

On August 26, 2022, her daughter Dulce Maria Gil died at the age of 53 of multiple sclerosis.

On March 26, 2025, it was revealed that Felicia Garza, Gil's female identity, had "died", as Gil told Argentinian journalist Maxiliano Lumbia during a phone call. Lumbia declared "We do not know why, but Felicia Garza somehow died, as did Felipe Gil at some point. Now, simbolically, Felicia Garza died to give a fresh start to Felipe Gil. I called her and she told me: 'I'm retiring from the entertainment world, I am not planning on appearing again', I told her: 'But why, Felicia?', and she told me: 'Don't call me Felicia, I am Felipe'. It was then that I noticed that Felicia had disappeared."

=== Health issues ===
In 2021, he declared on a television show named "Sale el Sol" that he had suffered thrombophlebitis on the inner part of his left leg, which according to him, was due to his hormonal treatments. He suffered pain in the area, and was hospitalized a few days.

== Personal life ==
Having been twice married, as Felicia, he considered himself a transbian. He had declared he hoped to find the love of a woman again in his life. She has an unspecified number of daughters, of whom, initially, only Dulce Maria accepted her transgenderness.

== See also ==
- List of Mexicans
- Samantha Love
