= Sergio Esquivel =

Mexican singer-songwriter (1946–2021)

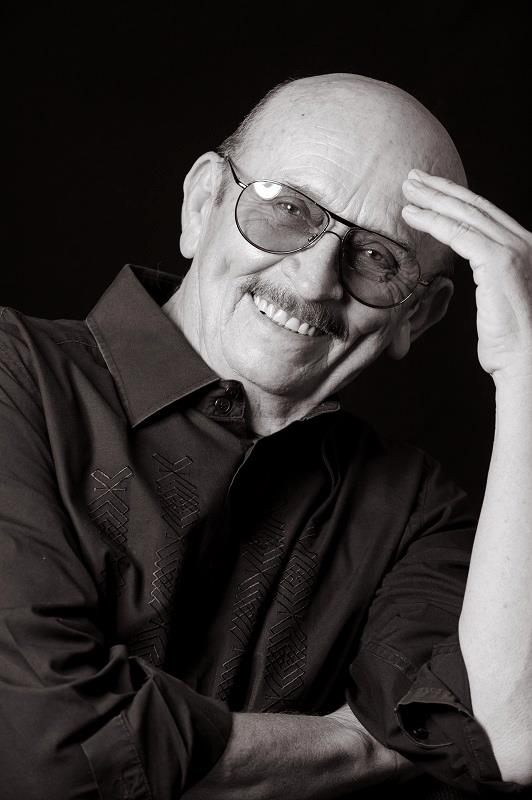

Background information
- Born: Sergio Iván Esquivel Cortés; December 8, 1946; Ticul, Yucatán, Mexico
- Died: April 24, 2021 (aged 74) Mérida, Yucatán, Mexico
- Occupation: Singer-songwriter

Sergio Iván Esquivel Cortés (8 December 1946 – 24 April 2021) was a Mexican singer-songwriter.

He recorded more than 20 albums as a performer. He wrote more than 350 songs which have been performed by singers such as José José, Emmanuel, Christian Castro, Marco Antonio Muñiz, Lupita D’Alessio, and others.
