= Yuri discography =

This is the discography for Mexican pop singer Yuri.

== Albums ==
- 1978: Tú Iluminas mi Vida
- 1980: Esperanzas
- 1981: Llena de dulzura
- 1983: Yuri: Sí, soy así
- 1984: Karma Kamaleón
- 1985: Yo te pido amor
- 1986: Un corazón herido
- 1987: Aire
- 1988: Isla del Sol
- 1989: Sui Generis
- 1990: Soy Libre
- 1992: Obsesiones
- 1993: Nueva era
- 1994: Reencuentros
- 1995: Espejos del Alma
- 1997: Más Fuerte que la Vida
- 1998: Huellas
- 2000: Que tu fe nunca muera
- 2002: Enamorada
- 2004: Yuri/A lo Mexicano
- 2006: Acompáñame
- 2006: Vive la Historia (DVD)
- 2008: Mi Hijita Linda
- 2010: Inusual
- 2011: Mi Tributo al Festival
- 2013: Mi Tributo al Festival II
- 2015: Invencible
- 2017: Primera Fila: Yuri
- 2021: Celebrando a una Leyenda
- 2025: Yuri y sus Amigos del Regional Mexicano

== Singles ==
Year	Title	Chart Positions		Album
Year	Title	US Latin	US Latin Pop	Album
1986	"Dame Un Beso"	28	-	Yo Te Pido Amor
1987	"¿Es Ella Más Que Yo?"	21	-	Un Corazón Herido
1987	"Un Corazón Herido"	12	-	Un Corazón Herido
1987	"Vivir Sin Ti"	26	-	Un Corazón Herido
1988	"¿Qué Te Pasa?"	1	-	Aire
1988	"Cuando Baja la Marea"	12	-	Aire
1989	"Hombres al Borde de un Ataque de Celos"	1	-	Isla del Sol
1989	"Isla del Sol"	30	-	Isla del Sol
1989	"Imposible Amarte Como Yo"	21	-	Isla del Sol
1989	"No Puedo Más"	20	-	Isla del Sol
1990	"Embrujada (Estoy)"	7	-	Sui Generis
1990	"Me Tienes Que Querer"	6	-	Sui Generis
1990	"Mi Vecina"	23	-	Sui Generis
1991	"Quién Eres Tú (Quem É Você)"	8	-	Soy Libre
1991	"Todo Mi Corazón"	5	-	Soy Libre
1993	"Como Te Amé (I'll Never Love This Way Again)"	34	-	Obsesiones
1993	"Poligamia"	11	-	Obsesiones
1994	"Detrás de Mi Ventana"	1	-	Nueva Era
1994	"Amiga Mía"	9	-	Nueva Era
1994	"Quiero Volver a Empezar"	-	15	Reencuentros
1994	"Juntos" (with Uniko Ko)	22	-	Reencuentros
1998	"¿Y Tú Cómo Estás? (E Tu Come Stai?)"	10	2	Huellas

=== Other records ===
- 1983: Sí, soy así (edited in Spain)
- 1984: Ni tu ni yo (edited in Spain)
- 1989: Algo de mi vida (Includes B Sides and Never Officially Edited Songs Previously)
- 1991: Isla del Sol (Brazil Edition, With 4 Songs In Portuguese)
- 1994: Reencuentros (Compilation That Includes 3 New Songs)
- 1998: Mi testimonio (Spoken Album That Includes The Song "Quién soy yo")
- 2001: En la luz (Compilation Of Christian Themes, With 1 New Song)

=== Collaborations and duets ===
- Y ahora juntos, with Oscar Athié (1984)
- Cantaré, cantarás, with Latin American Artists (1985)
- Dos en uno, with Jimmy Osmond (1986)
- Ven a cantar, with EMI Cast (1986)
- Esta navidad, with EMI Cast and Melody Cast (1987)
- Hay mil mundos differentes, with EMI Cast (1988)
- A better place /Un lugar mejor, with Don Johnson (1989)
- Píntalo, with Luis Angel (1990)
- Siempre fiel, with Sony Cast (1990)
- Química perfecta, with Luis Enrique (1992)
- Juntos, with Uniko-ko (1994)
- Hey Jude, with Sony Cast (1995)
- Y todo el mundo eres tu, with Tito Enríquez (1995)
- Medley: Alegres cantad, with Susana Zabaleta, Alejandra Ávalos and Sasha Sokol (1995)
- Quimbara, with Celia Cruz (1997)
- Burundanga, with Celia Cruz (1997)
- Paz del Alma, with Torre Fuerte and Rodrigo Espinoza (1997)
- Ven a mi casa esta navidad, with Polygram Cast (1997)
- Hoy que estamos juntos, with Rodrigo Espinoza (1998)
- Estoy aquí, with United Artist For Chiapas (1999)
- Por los buenos mexicanos, with Mexican Artists (2001)
- El último adiós, with Hispanic Artists (2001)
- Lo que soñé, with Rodrigo Espinoza (2001)
- El está al llegar, with Alex D´Castro (2003)
- Y llegaste tú, with Mijares (2004)
- Cosas del amor, with Ana Bárbara (2004)
- Popurrí Juan Gabriel, with Pandora (2004)
- Que no quede huella, with Guadalupe Esparza (2004)
- Cuatro vidas, with Vicente Fernández (2004)
- Esta navidad, with Moderatto, Mijares, Pandora and Sergio Fachelli (2005)
- Acompáñame, Duets CD with Mijares (2006)
- Hay una respuesta, with Christian Artists (2006)
- Ahora es el tiempo, with Christian Artists (2007)
- Todo mi corazón, with Los hijos de Sánchez (2008)
- Gracias, with Kumbia All Starz (2008)
- La múcura, with Flex (2009)

=== Other official recordings ===
- Quimbara, Included On the Album of La Manzana Eléctrica 1978
- Adiós Manhattan, Demo Recorded For Gamma In 1978, Published in 1989
- La balada del vagabundo, B Side Of The Single "Tú iluminas mi vida" (1978)
- Siempre hay un mañana, Song Used During Her Performance On The OTI (1979)
- Frente a frente, Included On The South American Version Of "Llena de dulzura" (1981)
- Si, soy así, Included On The Spanish Version Of "Yuri (Yo te amo, te amo)" (1983)
- Tiempos Mejores, Song Used During Her Performance On The OTI (1984)
- No se que pasa, Included On The Spanish Version Of "Karma kamaleon (Ni tú ni yo)" (1984)
- Hoy me siento libre, Included On The Spanish Version Of "Karma kamaleon (Ni tú ni yo)" (1984)
- Campana sobre campana, Included On the Album "Eterna navidad" (1986)
- Las posadas, Included On The Album "Ven a cantar" (1987)
- Las bicycletas adoran el sol, Included On the Album "Erase una vez" (1988)
- Mejor sola, B Side Of The Audio Cassette "Hola-Remix" (1989)
- Cassette de amor, Included On The Album "Algo de mi vida" (1989)
- No sucederá más, Included On The Album "Algo de mi vida" (1989)
- Maquillaje, Song Written By Nacho Cano Included On The Album "Algo de mi vida" (1989)
- El cascabel, Included On The Album "México, voz y sentimiento" (1990)
- Lo poquito que me queda, Included On The Album "México, voz y sentimiento vol. II" (1991)
- Hey hey, Song In Portuguese Included On The Album "Isla del Sol (Brasil Edition)" (1991)
- Nao somos iguais, Song In Portuguese Included On The Album "Isla del Sol (Brasil Edition)" (1991)
- Grito de paixao, Song In Portuguese Included On The Album "Isla del Sol (Brasil Edition)" (1991)
- Todas, Song In Portuguese Included On The Album "Isla del Sol (Brasil Edition)" (1991)
- Qué numerito, Included On The Album "Anímate" (1994)
- El espejo, Song Originally Recorded In 1986, Included On The Album "Por amor y desamor" (1995)
- Obladí obladá, Included On The Album "Hey Jude" (1995)
- La boa, Included On The Album "Nuestro aniversario" (1996)
- Sabor a mí, Included On the Album "Piano, voz y sentimiento" (1997)
- Celebremos, Included On The Album "Israel" (1998)
- Veracruz, Included On The Album "Antología del mariachi vol. 6" (1998)
- Noche criolla, Included On The Album "Antología del mariachi vol. 6" (1998)
- Clave azul, Included On the Album "Antología del mariachi vol. 6" (1998)
- La cumbancha, Incluida En El Album "Antología del mariachi vol. 6" (1998)
- ABCD, Included On The Album "Los cuates de Chabelo" (1999)
- Brillan las estrellas, Included On The Album "Buenas noches" (2006)
- Angelitos de colores, Included On The Album "Buenas noches" (2006)
- Una limosna para este pobre viejo, Included On The Album "Superestrellas en Navidad" (2007)

== Videography ==
1. 1982 El pequeño panda de Chapultepec
2. 1982 Maldita primavera
3. 1985 Yo te pido amor
4. 1985 Dame un beso
5. 1986 Es ella más que yo
6. 1986 Campana sobre campana
7. 1987 Las bicycletas adoran el sol
8. 1987 Las posadas
9. 1988 Qué te pasa
10. 1988 Cuando baja la marea
11. 1988 Hombres al borde de un ataque de celos
12. 1988 Hola
13. 1988 No puedo más
14. 1989 A Better Place / Un lugar mejor (dúo con Don Johnson)
15. 1989 Me tienes que querer
16. 1990 Sabes lo que pasa
17. 1990 El apagón (2 versiones)
18. 1990 Todo mi corazón
19. 1992 Decir adiós
20. 1992 Química perfecta (dueto con Luis Enrique)
21. 1992 Poligamia
22. 1993 Detrás de mi ventana
23. 1993 Amiga mía
24. 1994 Volver a empezar
25. 1994 Juntos (dúo con Unik-ko)
26. 1995 De qué te vale fingir
27. 1995 Engáñame
28. 1998 Y tú cómo estás
29. 1998 Soy feliz
30. 2000 Que tu fe nunca muera
31. 2002 Ya no vives en mí
32. 2005 Callados
33. 2006 Hay una respuesta
34. 2010 Arrepentida
35. 2010 Ya no vives en mí (remix)
36. 2011 Estoy Cansada
37. 2011 Ay Amor
38. 2013 El Triste
39. 2013 Tiempos Mejores
40. 2014 Invencible
41. 2014 Duele (ft. Reik)
42. 2015 Ahora
43. 2015 Al Bailar (ft. Yandel)
44. 2015 Presa
45. 2025 Icónica
