= Vivir Sin Ti =

Vivir sin ti (English: Living Without You") may refer to:

- "Vivir sin ti", a 1986 song by Yuri on her album Un corazón herido
- "Vivir sin ti", a 2010 song by Gilberto Santa Rosa on his album Irrepetible
- "Vivir sin ti", an unreleased song by Jennifer Lopez
- "Vivir sin ti, a 1999 song by Cristian Castro on his album Mi Vida Sin Tu Amor
- "Vivir sin ti", a song by Camilo Sesto
- "Vivir sin ti", a song by María Victoria
- "Vivir sin ti", a song by La Factoría
- "Vivir sin ti" a 1979 song by Estela Núñez, written by Roberto Robles and Eduardo Magallanes, which represented Mexico in the OTI Festival 1979
