= Algo de mi vida =

Algo de mi Vida

Studio album by Yuri
- Released: 1989 (Mexico)
- Recorded: 1978-1979, 1981-1983, 1987
- Genre: Pop
- Label: EMI Capitol de México

Yuri chronology
Aire (1987)	Algo de mi Vida (1989)	Isla del sol (1988)

Algo de mi vida (English: Something of my life) is an album by Mexican pop singer Yuri. It was released in 1988. The album was edited by EMI Capitol when Yuri left the company to join CBS Records. The company decided to include unpublished songs that were not incorporated in any previous releases, with the exception of the track "Amores clandestinos" (Clandestine loves) included in her album Aire. This album also has a speech of Yuri where she relates the beginning of her career, it also has several covers like "Maquillaje" (Make-up) of Mecano, "No sucederá más" (It won't happen anymore) from the Italian song "Non succedera più" of the singer Claudia Mori, "Cassette de amor" (Love cassette) of Dulce and "Frente a frente" (Face to face) of Jeanette. There was a single from this album, but it was edited only in Spain.

== Track listing ==
No.	Title	Writer(s)	Producer(s)	Length
1.	"Amores clandestinos (1987)"	Consuelo Arango, Difelisatti	Gian Pietro Felisatti	4:08
2.	"Maquillaje (1982)"	Nacho Cano		2:30
3.	"Cassette de amor (1982)"	Araujo, Honorio Herrero	Rafael Pérez Botija	3:13
4.	"Si, soy así (1983)"	Lolita de la Colina	Rafael Trabucchelli, A. Serrano	2:15
5.	"Siempre hay un mañana (1979)"	Irasema	Irasema	3:23
6.	"No sucederá más (Non succederà più)(1982)"			3:50
7.	"Algo de mi vida (1983)"	D.A.R.	Rafael Trabucchelli, A. Serrano	8:49
8.	"Popurrí (Solos/Soy un garabato/De pequeños/Yo te amo, te amo/¡Oh Mamma!)(1983)"	José Luis Perales, Lolita de la Colina, Jesús Glück, Javier Muro, Maryni Callajo, Mari Trini	Rafael Trabuchelli, A. Serrano, Jesús Glück	5:04
9.	"Adiós Manhattan (1979)"	Miguel Tottis, Bebu Silvetti	Bebu Silvetti, Julio Jaramillo	4:23
10.	"Frente a frente (1981)"	Manuel Alejandro, Ana Magdalena	Manuel Alejandro	3:08

== Production ==
- Executive producer: EMI Capitol de México
- Musical arrangements: Gian Pietro Felisatti, Rafael Pérez Botija, Rafael Trabuchelli, A. Serrano, Jesús Glück, Bebu Silvetti, Julio Jaramillo
- Graphic design: J. Vicente Diosdado G.

== Singles ==
- Amores clandestinos
