= Acompáñame =

Acompáñame may refer to:

- Acompáñame (TV series), a 1977 Mexican telenovela
- Acompáñame (album), an album by Yuri and Mijares
- Acompáñame, an album by Rocío Dúrcal
- Acompáñame (film), a 1966 Argentine film directed by Luis César Amadori
