= Mi Testimonio =

Studio album by Yuri
- Released: 1997
- Recorded: 1997
- Genre: Christian music
- Label: Piedra Angular

Yuri chronology
Más Fuerte que la Vida (1996)	Mi Testimonio (1997)	Huellas (1998)

Mi testimonio (My testimony) is a cassette by Mexican pop singer Yuri. It was released in 1997. Officially, this is not considered an album, but rather a "talk cassette".

== Critical reception ==
At the end of 1997, Yuri released this cassette with a speech, in which she talks about her conversion to the Evangelical Protestantism, her approach with God, and the way many people reproached this move.

Yuri has been criticized for switching to the Evangelical faith and abandoning the Catholic faith, since her country, Mexico, is largely devoted to the Roman Catholic Church.

The cassette sold more than 12,000 copies.

== Content ==
1. Her testimony (Speech)
2. "Paz en el alma" (Peace in the soul)... Song
3. "Otra vez ante ti" (Again in front of you)... Song
