= Yo tenía diez perritos =

Spanish-language children's song

"Yo tenía diez perritos" (transl. I used to have ten puppies), sometimes known as simply "Los diez perritos" (transl. The ten puppies), is a traditional Spanish-language children's song of anonymous authorship. The song consists of a counting-down rhyme in which the singer starts out with ten puppies. Each verse describes one puppy's misadventures, reducing the number by one each time. Early folklorists noted it as part of Hispanic oral tradition, widely spread across the Spanish-speaking world. By the mid-20th century, versions were documented in numerous Spanish-speaking countries, such as Cuba, Spain and Peru.

== History ==
One hypothesis proposed by researchers from the University of Castilla–La Mancha says that the song may have originated from 19th-century English-language counting songs for children; another traced the song back to the traditions of Portugal and Lower Brittany. The study linked "Los diez perritos" to a lineage of songs beginning with Ten Little Injuns, a song published in 1868 by American songwriter Septimus Winner. Winner's song was a xenophobic song that counted ten Native American boys (or, in some versions, black children), as they disappeared one by one. These types of counting-out songs were popular in the late 1800s despite their content. However, as societal attitudes changed in the 20th century, the original lyrics became less and less socially acceptable. The lyrics were thus adapted to replace the derogatory depictions of human children with innocent characters, typically animals. The university scholars argue that this adaptation allowed the catchy formula to survive.

Once introduced to Latin America, the song spread through oral tradition and was highly popular. By the early 20th century, folklorists recorded local variants across the region. For example, a Chilean compilation from Carahue in the 1910s documented a version with locally adapted words, for example to reference the Mapocho River. Similar versions have been noted in Mexico, Central America and the Caribbean. Over time, the song also became known in Spain. It eventually entered Spanish oral archives; for instance, a 2005 field recording in Segovia captured a family singing the tune together.

== Lyrics and melody ==
Show translation
Spanish

𝄆 Yo tenía diez perritos 𝄇
Uno no come ni bebe
No me quedan más que nueve, nueve, nueve, nueve, nueve

𝄆 Yo tenía nueve perritos 𝄇
Uno se tragó un bizcocho
No me quedan más que ocho, ocho, ocho, ocho, ocho

𝄆 De los ocho que quedaban 𝄇
Uno lo mató un machete... siete

𝄆 De los siete que quedaban 𝄇
Uno se murió de sed... seis

𝄆 De los seis que me quedaban 𝄇
Uno se murió de un brinco... cinco

𝄆 De los cinco que me quedan 𝄇
Uno se fue para el teatro... cuatro

𝄆 De los cuatro que me quedan 𝄇
Uno se viró al revés... tres

𝄆 De los tres que me quedaban 𝄇
Uno se murió de tos... dos

𝄆 De los dos que me quedaban 𝄇
Uno se lo llevó Bruno
No me queda más que uno, uno, uno, uno, uno

𝄆 Y ese uno que quedaba 𝄇
Ése se quedó conmigo
Él es mi mejor amigo, amigo, amigo, amigo, amigo

— Sources:
Translation:
English

𝄆 I used to have ten puppies 𝄇
One wouldn't eat or drink
All I have left are nine, nine, nine, nine, nine

𝄆 I used to have nine puppies 𝄇
One swallowed a piece of cake
All I have left are eight, eight, eight, eight, eight

𝄆 Of the eight that were still left 𝄇
One was killed by a machete... seven

𝄆 Of the seven that were still left 𝄇
One died of thirst... six

𝄆 Of the six I still had left 𝄇
One died from a dive... five

𝄆 Of the five that were still left 𝄇
One went to the theatre... four

𝄆 Of the four that were still left 𝄇
One turned inside out... three

𝄆 Of the three that were still left 𝄇
One died of coughing... two

𝄆 Of the two that were still left 𝄇
Bruno took one home
All I have left is one, one, one, one, one

𝄆 And the one I still had left 𝄇
That one stayed with me
He's my best friend, friend, friend, friend, friend

The lyrics above are only one version of the song, and there are many variations of it that are used. There are versions where the singer's dogs all die or otherwise leave, and versions where the puppies' mother gives birth to a new litter. An example of another alternative ending that has been used in the past is:

Spanish

Ese uno fue para el monte
Solo me queda su nombre
Y su nombre se me olvidó
Y este cuento se acabó, -bó, -bó, -bó, -bó.

— Source:
Translation:
English

That one went into the mountains
All I have left is his name
But I forgot his name
That's the end of this story, story, story, story, story.

== Reception ==
Yo tenía diez perritos has been cherished over the years as a rather playful song, but some parents and commentators raised concerns about the song's lyrics in addition to its racist origins. Specifically, they noted that in some versions the puppies all suffer an unfortunate fate. Additionally, a folkloric study noted a Costa Rican version with the equivalent of the N-word instead of puppies, which modern audiences would recognize as racist. Such versions, though, are largely obsolete and the overwhelmingly common version with puppies has largely evaded the stigma attached to its 19th-century predecessor and is seen as a positive example of how folk traditions change over time. Educators have also lauded the song's pedagogical value; it has been cited in academic papers and educational resources about using music and rhyme to teach counting and language to young children.

In academic circles, the song has drawn interest from folklorists, musicologists, and educators alike. Scholars have praised it as a case of oral tradition adaptation and cross-cultural transmission. Folklorists in Spain and Latin America throughout the 20th century collected versions of it, contributing to studies of children's lore and the universality of counting rhymes.

Some early researchers proposed creative theories surrounding the song as well. For example, one conjecture was that songs such as this might have been used as chants for use when curing illnesses, but later experts have debunked these claims due to lack of evidence.

== Recordings ==
The song has been recorded and performed by numerous artists, especially those who focus on children's music. One of the most famous early recordings of the song was by Cepillín, who included it on his debut album of children's songs in 1970. His version became a staple on Latin American radio and television during the 1970s. Another well-known rendition is by Tatiana, a well-known Mexican children's artist, who released a recording of it in 1995.

== See also ==
- La Cucaracha
- La Bamba (song)
