= Hombres al Borde de un Ataque de Celos =

Single by Yuri

from the album Isla del Sol
- Released: 1988
- Recorded: 1988; Estudio Baby (Milan, Italy); Cerroni (Bologna, Italy); Eurosonic; Torres Sonido (Madrid, Spain)
- Genre: Latin dance
- Length: 2:59
- Label: CBS Discos
- Songwriter: J.R. Florez
- Producer: Gian Pietro Felisatti · Loris Ceroni

Yuri singles chronology
"Cuando Baja la Marea" (1988)	"Hombres al Borde de un Ataque de Celos" (1988)	"Isla del Sol" (1989)

"Hombres al Borde de un Ataque de Celos" ("Men on the Verge of a Jealous Outbreak") is a dance song written by J.R. Florez, produced by Gian Pietro Felisatti and Loris Ceroni, and performed by Mexican singer Yuri. It was released in 1988 as the first single from her studio album Isla del Sol (1988), and became her second number-one single in the Billboard Hot Latin Tracks chart after "Qué Te Pasa" in 1988. Isla del Sol was the first album recorded by the singer on CBS, her record label until 1995. This song became one of her staple on every live performance and was also included on the live album Vive la Historia.

The song debuted on the Billboard Hot Latin Tracks chart at number 24 on January 7, 1989 and climbed to the top ten three weeks later. It reached the top position of the chart on February 18, 1989, replacing "Cómo Tu Mujer" by Spanish singer Rocío Dúrcal and being replaced four weeks later by José José's "Como Tú". "Hombres al Borde de un Ataque de Celos" ended 1989 as the ninth best-performing Latin single of the year in United States.

Yuri also recorded the song in Brazilian Portuguese.

== Charts ==
Chart (1989)	Peak position
Ecuador (UPI)	3
Mexico (AMPROFON)	4
Panama (UPI)	7
Puerto Rico (UPI)	2
US Hot Latin Songs (Billboard)	1

== See also ==
- List of number-one Billboard Top Latin Songs from the 1980s
