= Maledetta primavera =

1981 single by Loretta Goggi

Single by Loretta Goggi

from the album Il mio prossimo amore
- Released: February 1981
- Recorded: February 1981
- Genre: Pop
- Length: 4:10 (album version)
- Label: WEA
- Songwriters: Paolo Cassella; Totò Savio
- Producer: Totò Savio

"Maledetta primavera" (pronounced [maleˈdetta primaˈvɛːra]; Italian for "Damned springtime") is a song written by Paolo Cassella and Gaetano "Totò" Savio and performed by Italian singer Loretta Goggi in 1981, at the 31st edition of the Sanremo Music Festival. Coming second in the festival, it became a hit in Italy, with later covers in several other languages also garnering success around the world.

== Cover versions ==
In Latin America, Mexican singer Yuri included a Spanish-language cover, "Maldita primavera", in her 1981 album Llena de dulzura, topping the single chart in Mexico, Argentina, Spain, Venezuela and Costa Rica. The album itself sold more than 2.6 million copies, more than 360,000 in Mexico alone. Another Mexican singer, Yuridia, recorded this in her 2005 album La voz de un ángel. In 2012, Dominican singer Yiyo Sarante made a salsa version of "La maldita primavera".

Finnish singer Paula Koivuniemi published the Finnish version "Aikuinen nainen" in 1982. She has performed it at live concerts afterwards. In Germany, Caterina Valente sang the cover "Das kommt nie wieder". In Belgium, Dana Winner sang both the Dutch version "Vrij als een vogel" and the English version "Flying High". In Czechoslovakia, Petra Janů sang a popular Czech cover called "Moje malá premiéra". In Yugoslavia, Maja Blagdan sang the Croatian version "Zaboravi" and Tinkara Kovač sang the Slovenian version "Vigred s snegom me odeva".

In 2006, singer Patrizio Buanne included a cover of the original version in his album Forever Begins Tonight (Universal Music TV).

== Charts ==
Chart (1981)	Peak position
Austria (Ö3 Austria Top 40)	9
Italy (Musica e dischi)	1
Switzerland (Schweizer Hitparade)	2
West Germany (GfK)	8
