= Yo te pido amor =

Yo Te Pido Amor

Studio album by Yuri
- Released: November 21, 1985
- Recorded: 1985
- Genre: Pop
- Label: EMI Music

Yuri chronology
Karma Kamaleón (1984)	Yo Te Pido Amor (1985)	Un corazón herido (1986)

Yo Te Pido Amor (I Ask You for Love) is the sixth album by Mexican pop singer Yuri. It was released on November 21, 1985, by EMI Music, her first for the label. The album sold 600,000 units.

== Reception ==
In the United States, the album reached No. 23 on the Billboard Latin Pop Albums chart. It was nominated for a Grammy Award for Best Latin Pop Performance.

== Track listing ==
No.	Title	Writer(s)	Producer(s)	Length
1.	"Dame un beso"	Difelisatti, J.R. Florez	Noé-Santapaga, Gian Pietro Felisatti, Jesús Glück	3:08
2.	"Yo te pido amor"	Difelisatti, J.R. Florez	Gian Pierto Felisatti, Jesús Glück	3:45
3.	"El amor es un boomerang"	A. Marcos, J.R. Florez	Noé-Santapaga, Gian Pierto Felisatti	2:50
4.	"Perdona"	Hernaldo Zúñiga	Gian Pierto Felisatti, Jesús Glück	3:42
5.	"Sálvame"	Jesús Glück, J.R. Florez	Gian Pierto Felisatti, Eduardo Leyva	3:25
6.	"Déjala"	Difelisatti, J.R. Florez	Gian Pierto Felisatti, Eduardo Leyva	3:34
7.	"Mal"	Damiani, Del Sarto, J.R. Florez	Gian Pierto Felisatti	2:50
8.	"Te quiero"	J.R. Florez	Gian Pierto Felisatti, Eduardo Leyva	3:40
9.	"Si te pierdo"	Hernaldo Zúñiga	Gian Pierto Felisatti, Jesús Glück	3:11
10.	"Carrillón"	Loris Ceroni, J.R. Florez	Noé-Santapaga	3:25

== Production ==
- Executive producer: Miguel Blasco
- Director: Gian Pietro Felisatti
- Musical arrangements: Gian Pietro Felisatti, Noah-Santapaga
- String arrangements: Gian Pietro Felisatti, Jesus Gluck, Eduardo Leyva
- Recording studio: Eurosonic (Madrid) and Baby Studios (Milan)
- Sound engineer: Massimo Noé and J. Alvarez Alija
- Assistant: Alberto Pinto
- Musicians: Lele Melotti (drums), Pino Santapaga (guitar), Luigi Capellot (bass), Piero Cairo (keyboards)
- Photography: Serapio Carreño
- Graphic design: ZEN
- Stylist: Cheska

== Singles ==
1. "Yo te pido amor"
2. "Dame un beso"
3. "Déjala"
4. "El amor es un boomerang"
5. "Te quiero"

=== Singles charts ===
Title	Mexico	Argentina	Colombia	Costa Rica	Guatemala	US Latin	Venezuela
"Dame un beso"	1	1	1	1	1	28	1
"Yo te pido amor"	1	5	1	1	1	—	1
"Déjala"	1	19	5	1	1	—	10
