= Sui Generis (album) =

Studio album by Yuri
- Released: September 24, 1989
- Recorded: 1989 in Madrid, Milan, Bologna and Los Angeles
- Genre: Pop
- Label: CBS International
- Producers: Loris Cerronni, Gian Pietro Felisatti

Yuri chronology
Isla del Sol (1988)	Sui Generis (1989)	Soy Libre (1990)

Sui Generis is the tenth album by Mexican pop singer Yuri, released on September 24, 1989. It has sold more than 350,000 copies and been certified Gold and Platinum.

== Track listings ==
=== First edition ===
No.	Title	Writer(s)	Producer(s)	Length
1.	"Embrujada (Estoy)"	Consuelo Arango	Gian Pietro Felisatti, Santa-Noé and Loris Cerrone	3:05
2.	"Es Inútil Ya"	Omar, Rodolfo Von Horsten	Gian Pietro Felisatti, Santa-Noé and Loris Cerrone	3:25
3.	"Déjame Amarte Más"	Marcela Cayre, Consuelo Arango	Gian Pietro Felisatti, Santa-Noé and Loris Cerrone	3:05
4.	"Fascinación"	M. Manning, D. Marcheti, Adap. J. Pal	Gian Pietro Felisatti, Santa-Noé and Loris Cerrone	3:20
5.	"Fiesta del Interior (Festa do interior)"	Moreas Moreira, Abel Silva, I. Ballesteros	Gian Pietro Felisatti, Santa-Noé and Loris Cerrone	3:25
6.	"Me Tienes Que Querer"	J. R. Florez	Gian Pietro Felisatti, Santa-Noé and Loris Cerrone	3:40
7.	"Tienes el Control de Mi Corazón"	Consuelo Arango, Miguel Blasco, J.R. Florez	Gian Pietro Felisatti, Santa-Noé and Loris Cerrone	3:45
8.	"Amigos"	Gian Pierto Felisatti, J.R. Florez	Gian Pietro Felisatti, Santa-Noé and Loris Cerrone	4:20
9.	"Mi Vecina"	Consuelo Arango	Gian Pietro Felisatti, Santa-Noé and Loris Cerrone	3:25
10.	"Por Buen Camino"	Marcela Cayre, Consuelo Arango	Gian Pietro Felisatti, Santa-Noé and Loris Cerrone	5:00
11.	"Fiebre"	J.R. Florez, Miguel Blasco, César Valle	Gian Pietro Felisatti, Santa-Noé and Loris Cerrone	3:40

=== Second edition ===
No.	Title	Writer(s)	Producer(s)	Length
1.	"Embrujada (Estoy)"	Consuelo Arango	Gian Pietro Felisatti, Santa-Noé and Loris Cerrone	3:05
2.	"Es inútil"	Omar, Rodolfo Von Horsten	Gian Pietro Felisatti, Santa-Noé and Loris Cerrone	3:25
3.	"Déjame amarte más"	Marella Cayre, Consuelo Arango	Gian Pietro Felisatti, Santa-Noé and Loris Cerrone	3:05
4.	"Amigos"	Gian Pietro Felisatti	Gian Pietro Felisatti, Santa-Noé and Loris Cerrone	4:20
5.	"Tines el control de mi corazón"	Consuelo Arango, Miguel Blasco, J.R. Flores	Gian Pietro Felisatti, Santa-Noé and Loris Cerrone	3:45
6.	"Por buen camino"	Marella Cayre, Consuelo Arango	Gian Pietro Felisatti, Santa-Noé and Loris Cerrone	5:00
7.	"Fiebre"	J.R. Flores, Miguel Blasco, César Valle	Gian Pietro Felisatti, Santa-Noé and Loris Cerrone	3:40
8.	"Fascinación"	M. Manning, D. Marcheti, Adap. J. Pal	Gian Pietro Felisatti, Santa-Noé and Loris Cerrone	3:20
9.	"Mi vecina"	Consuelo Arango	Gian Pietro Felisatti, Santa-Noé and Loris Cerrone	3:25
10.	"Me tienes que querer"	J.R. Flores	Gian Pietro Felisatti, Santa-Noé and Loris Cerrone	3:40
11.	"Fiesta del interior (Festa do interior)"	Moreas Moreira, Abel Silva, I. Ballesteros	Gian Pietro Felisatti, Santa-Noé and Loris Cerrone	3:25
12.	"Hey, hey (Hombres al borde de un ataque de celos)" (Portuguese version)	J.R. Flores, Claudio Rabello	Gian Pietro Felisatti, Santanoe	3:15

== Production ==
- Executive producer: Miguel Blasco
- Director: Loris Cerrone and Gian Pietro Felisatti
- Musical arrangements: Gian Pietro Felisatti, Santa-Noé and Loris Ceroni
- Sound engineer: Santa-Noé and Loris Cerrone
- Voice and mix engineer: John Pace and Gary Wagner
- Recording Studios: Baby Baby-Milán, Cerrone Studio-Gastel Bolognese, Conway Studios-Los Angeles, California
- Mixed at: Balu Bala Studio-Madrid
- Art direction: Arturo Medellín
- Photography: Germán Herrera (Encamera)
- Graphic design: Karem Tretmanis
- Makeup: Eduardo Arias
- Fashion designer: Gabriela Diaque

== Singles ==
- "Embrujada (Estoy)"
- "Me Tienes Que Querer"
- "Mi Vecina"
- "Tienes el control de mi corazón"

=== Singles charts ===
Title	Mexico	Colombia	Costa Rica	Guatemala	Nicaragua	Panama	Peru	US Latin	Venezuela
"Embrujada (Estoy)"	1	9	5	2	1	1	10	7	5
"Me tienes que querer"	5	8	10	5	2	15	2	6	10
"Mi vecina"	10	21	—	18	5	30	—	23	—
