= Detrás de Mi Ventana =

Song by Yuri

Single by Yuri

from the album Nueva Era
- Released: 1993
- Genre: Latin pop
- Length: 4:39
- Label: Sony
- Songwriter: Ricardo Arjona
- Producer: Alex Zepeda

Yuri singles chronology
"Poligamia" (1993)	"Detrás de Mi Ventana" (1993)	"Amiga Mía" (1994)

"Detrás de Mi Ventana" (Behind My Window) is a Latin pop song by Mexican recording artist Yuri from her studio album Nueva Era (1993). The track was written by Guatemalan singer-songwriter Ricardo Arjona. It was released as the lead single in Latin America and the United States, peaking atop the Billboard's Latin Songs chart, becoming the third number-one song in the chart for the singer and the first for Arjona as a songwriter.

The track has been widely covered by several performers including a merengue version by Puerto-Rican American Melina León in 2001, and a banda version American singer Jenni Rivera on her album Joyas Prestadas, which became a top twenty hit in the Latin charts in the United States and received the Lo Nuestro Award for Pop Song of the Year.

== Background ==
Guatemalan singer-songwriter Ricardo Arjona received a proposal to join Sony Music in 1991, and before the release of his first studio album with the label, Del Otro Lado del Sol, Arjona wrote several songs to be recorded by other artists, such as the performers of the soundtrack for the Mexican telenovela Alcanzar una estrella: "La Mujer Que No Soñé" ("The Woman I Never Dreamed Of") by Eduardo Capetillo and the title track sung by Mariana Garza. Arjona was asked to write a song for Mexican singer Yuri to be included on her new album, produced by Alex Zepeda, and Arjona submitted "Detrás de Mi Ventana", a song about a failed love relationship between a bored housewife and an absent husband, which was later named a "riveting ballad" by John Lannert of Billboard magazine.

== Chart performance ==
The track debuted in the Billboard Latin Songs (formerly Hot Latin Tracks) chart at number 32 in the week of December 4, 1993 climbing to the top ten three weeks later. The song peaked at number-one on January 29, 1994, replacing "Cerca de Ti" by American band Barrio Boyzz and being succeeded by "Luna" by Mexican singer-songwriter Ana Gabriel, three weeks later. "Detrás de Mi Ventana" was Yuri's first number-one single in the chart since "Hombres al Borde de un Ataque de Celos" in 1989. The song ended 1994 as the ninth best performing Latin single of the year in the United States. Ricardo Arjona earned the American Society of Composers, Authors and Publishers award for Pop/Contemporary Song in 1995 for "Detrás de Mi Ventana". In November 1999, the song was labeled as one of the "hottest tracks" for Sony Discos in a list including the most successful releases by the label since the launching of the Billboard Hot Latin Tracks chart in 1986.

=== Charts ===
==== Weekly charts ====
Chart (1994)	Peak position
US Latin Songs (Billboard)	1

==== Year-end charts ====
Chart (1994)	Peak position
US Latin Songs (Billboard)	9

== Cover versions ==
In 1997, Yuri recorded a mariachi version of the track for her album Más Fuerte que la Vida. Puerto-Rican American singer Melina León recorded a merengue version of the song for her album Corazón de Mujer, produced by Omar Alfanno in 2001. According to Manuel Vega, of the Panamanian newspaper La Prensa, listening the track "you would never guess that it was written for another musical genre." Mexican singer Yuridia released in 2005 La Voz de un Ángel, an album that included a selection of tracks performed by her in the reality talent competition show La Academia; the album featured her version of "Detrás de Mi Ventana". The song was later included in the musical Mentiras (Lies) in 2009, along several popular songs in the decade of the 1980s in Mexico originally performed by María Conchita Alonso, Oscar Athié, Dulce, Lupita D'Alessio, Emmanuel, Franco, Marisela, Mijares, Prisma, and Daniela Romo.

In 2015, soda drink company Pepsi released a commercial inspired on the song but relating the boredom of an office worker about his daily life, with the lyrics changed to fit with his day-to-day drama. The music then stops when someone offers him a can of soda of the company.

=== Jenni Rivera version ===
"Detrás de Mi Ventana"

Single by Jenni Rivera

from the album Joyas Prestadas
- Released: 2012
- Recorded: Twin Recording Studio, Burbank, California, USA
- Genre: Latin pop ballad, Banda ballad
- Length: 4:22 (pop version); 4:37 (banda version)
- Label: Fonovisa
- Songwriter: Ricardo Arjona
- Producer: Enrique Martínez

Jenni Rivera singles chronology
"A Cambio de Qué" (2012)	"Detrás de Mi Ventana" (2012)	"La Misma Gran Señora" (2013)

Mexican-American singer Jenni Rivera released in 2011 Joyas Prestadas, a double album consisting of a collection of eleven tracks originally performed by other singers, whom made them notable back in their original release. Rivera recorded these songs in two versions: pop and banda. According to her, the songs she chose were recordings she listened to while working as a record store cashier. The albums were produced by Enrique Martinez and were recorded at the Twin Recording Studio in Burbank, California. "Detrás de Mi Ventana" was chosen as the third and final single released from the album on July 3, 2012. The song peaked at sixteen on the Billboard Hot Latin Songs chart and number six on the Regional Mexican Songs chart, respectively. This version earned the Lo Nuestro Award for Pop Song of the Year at the 26th Lo Nuestro Awards in 2014.

==== Charts ====
Chart (2012)	Peak position
US Regional Mexican Songs (Billboard)	6

Chart (2013)	Peak position
US Hot Latin Songs (Billboard)	12
US Latin Airplay (Billboard)	9

== See also ==
- List of number-one hits of 1993 (Mexico)
- List of number-one Billboard Hot Latin Tracks of 1994
