= Tú Iluminas mi Vida =

Studio album by Yuri
- Released: 1978
- Recorded: 1977–1978
- Genre: Pop
- Label: Discos Gamma
- Producers: Julio Jaramillo (tracks 1, 2, 5, 7 and 9), Rodrigo Alvarez (tracks 3, 4, 6, 8 and 10)

Yuri chronology
Tú Iluminas mi Vida (1978)	Esperanzas (1980)

Singles from Tú Iluminas mi Vida
- 1. "Tú iluminas mi vida" 2. "Las Cosas Bonitas del Amor"; 3. "Que haremos el domingo" 4. "Espinita"

Tú Iluminas mi Vida is the debut album by Mexican pop singer, Yuri. It was released in 1978. Her first single that gained some airplay was "Tú iluminas mi vida"; it was a cover of the song "You Light Up My Life" by Debby Boone. This album is considered a rarity as it is discontinued. It received promotion in the movies Milagro en el circo and En familia con Chabelo.

== Track listing ==
No.	Title	Writer(s)	Producer(s)	Length
1.	"Tú iluminas mi vida (You Light Up My Life)"	Joe Brooks, Adap. Irasema	Julio Jaramillo	3:25
2.	"Las cosas bonitas del amor"	Rossana Rosas	Julio Jaramillo	2:56
3.	"Espinita"	Nico Jiménez	Rodrigo Alvarez	2:45
4.	"Así (Alone)"	Morly Kraft, Selma Kraft, Adap. Irasema	Rodrigo Alvarez	2:30
5.	"Canta, reir, silbar"	Pedro Lacorte	Julio Jaramillo	2:45
6.	"Soñando (Dreamin')"	B. de Vorzon, T. Ellis, Adap. Irasema	Rodrigo Alvarez	2:30
7.	"Nos pertenecemos (We Belong Together)"	R. Carr, J. Mitchel	Julio Jaramillo	2:35
8.	"Hoy todo es amor"	Mario Alberto	Rodrigo Alvarez	2:38
9.	"Qué haremos el domingo"	Alfonso Mario Montaño Olea	Julio Jaramillo	3:05
10.	"Suave tristeza"	Oscar Gómez Díaz	Rodrigo Alvarez	2:50

== Production ==
- Arrangements and Direction: Julio Jaramillo and Rodrigo Alvarez
- Label: Gamma records, 1978
- Backing vocals: Hermanos Zavala

== Singles ==
1. "Tú iluminas mi vida"
2. "Las cosas bonitas del amor"
3. "Que haremos el Domingo"
4. "Espinita"

Between this album and the following one, she released 1 more single, but it was not included in any album:

No.	Title	Writer(s)	Producer(s)	Length
1.	"La balada del Vagabundo"	José Guardiola	Julio Jaramillo	2:35
