= Qué Te Pasa =

Single by Yuri

from the album Aire
- Released: 1987
- Recorded: 1987; The Hit Factory (New York, New York)
- Genre: Latin dance
- Length: 3:22
- Label: EMI Capitol
- Songwriter: DiFelisatti · J.R. Florez
- Producer: DiFelisatti

Yuri singles chronology
"Mamá Dame" (1987)	"Qué Te Pasa" (1987)	"Cuando Baja la Marea" (1988)

"Qué Te Pasa" ("What's Up With You") is a dance song written by J.R. Florez and Gian Pietro DiFelissati, produced by Felissatti and performed by Mexican singer Yuri. It was released in 1987 as the first single from her seventh studio album Aire (1987), and became her first number-one single in the Billboard Hot Latin Tracks chart and won the Lo Nuestro Award for Pop Song of the Year in 1989.

This song was a success in Mexico and United States, leading the parent album to its peak at number eight in the Billboard Latin Pop Albums and approximate sales of one and a half million units in Latin America.

== Background ==
In 1987, after her third participation on the OTI Festival, Yuri did a special appearance in the Miss México contest, along with fellow Mexican singer Luis Miguel, and this would be one of her last performances that year, since she decided to marry Fernando Iriarte. She recorded in late 1987 Aire, under the guidance of DiFelisatti and J.R. Florez. This was her last album with EMI, since she signed with Sony Music in 1988. The first single released from this album was "Qué Te Pasa", a song that was included twenty years later on Yuri's first live album Vive la Historia. The song was also featured in the film Selena (1997), starred by Jennifer López.

== Chart performance ==
"Qué Te Pasa" spent sixteen weeks at number one, surpassing the records held by fellow Mexican singers Daniela Romo and Ana Gabriel, when their singles "De Mí Enamórate" and "Ay Amor", respectively, spent fourteen weeks at the top of the chart, becoming the song with most weeks at number one in the 1980s. Yuri held this record for twelve years, until Son By Four with "A Puro Dolor", which spent 20 weeks at number-one in 2000. Currently the song ranks twelfth for songs with most weeks at the top of the chart.

The song debuted on the Billboard Hot Latin Tracks chart at number 36 on April 9, 1988, and climbed to the top ten three weeks later. It reached the top position of the chart on May 5, 1988. The song ended the year as the second best-performing single of 1988.

== See also ==
- List of number-one Billboard Top Latin Songs from the 1980s
