= Mi Hijita Linda =

Studio album by Yuri
- Released: December 2008 (Mexico)
- Recorded: 2008
- Genre: Pop
- Length: 42:47 min
- Label: EMI Televisa Music
- Producer: Manuel Calderón; Gian Pietro Felisatti; Luigi Giraldo; Jorge Avendaño Lührs

Yuri chronology
Vive la Historia (2007)	Mi Hijita Linda (2008)	Inusual (2010)

Mi Hijita Linda (English: My cute little daughter) is the 22nd studio album by Mexican pop singer Yuri. It was released in early December 2008. The album has the participation of the singer Flex in the song La Múcura and it has several covers like the folk song "La bamba" and one of the most famous cumbia songs "La Pollera Colorá" (The red skirt).

== Reception ==
Yuri returned with this new album under the supervision of EMI Televisa Music and four producers. However this comeback did not work, since the album was panned by critics and fans in general; most of the public blamed the label since there was not enough promotion to support the album equally in Mexico as outside Mexico.

== Track listing ==
Tracks:

No.	Title	Writer(s)	Producer(s)	Length
1.	"Sí mi hijita linda"		Luigi Giraldo	3:10
2.	"Ya no me ames"	Gian Pietro Felisatti / Miguel Luna	G.P. Felisatti, Jorge Avendaño	3:03
3.	"La Múcura (Ft. Nigga)"		Luigi Giraldo	3:12
4.	"Me has echado al olvido"	Roberto Carlos	G.P. Felisatti, Jorge Avendaño	4:24
5.	"Pepe"		Luigi Giraldo	3:17
6.	"Salvemos nuestro amor"	Miguel Luna	G.P. Felisatti, Jorge Avendaño	4:02
7.	"La Bamba"	Dominio público	Luigi Giraldo	3:09
8.	"Lo que son las cosas"	Luis Angel	G.P. Felisatti, Jorge Avendaño	4:05
9.	"La Pollera colorá"		Luigi Giraldo	3:04
10.	"Estúpida romántica"	Gian Pietro Felisatti / Miguel Luna	G.P. Felisatti, Jorge Avendaño	3:25
11.	"María Cristina"		Luigi Giraldo	3:26
12.	"La Bamba" (Bonus track, Version for children)	Dominio público	Luigi Giraldo	3:05

== Production ==
- Executive producer and Art direction: Manuel Calderón
- Production: Luigi Giraldo, Gian Pietro Felisatti and Jorge Avendaño Lührs
- Label: EMI
- Year: 2008

== Singles ==
- Mi hijita linda
- Ya no me ames (in United States)
- Estúpida romántica (in United States)

#	Title	Date
1.	"Sí, mi hijita linda"	2009
