= Isla del Sol (album) =

Studio album by Yuri
- Released: October 17, 1988
- Recorded: July – August 1988
- Studios: Baby Studios (Milan); Cerroni (Bologna, Italy); Estudios Eurosonic (Madrid); Torres Sonido (Madrid)
- Genre: Pop
- Label: Sony Music
- Producers: Loris Cerronni, Gian Pietro Felisatti

Yuri chronology
Aire (1987)	Isla del Sol (1988)	Sui Generis (1989)

Isla del Sol (Island of the Sun) is the ninth album by Mexican pop singer Yuri, released on October 17, 1988. The album sold more than 350,000 copies, earning a Platinum certification. After this success, Sony Music offered her better international exposure, prompting the change in label from EMI Music. On the Billboard Latin Pop Albums chart, it debuted and peaked at number 17 in February 1989.

A Portuguese version of the album was released in Brazil, where it sold enough copies to be certified Gold.

== Track listings ==
No.	Title	Writer(s)	Producer(s)	Length
1.	"Hola"	Loris Cerrone, J.R. Flores	Loris Cerrone	2:57
2.	"Imposible amarte como yo"	Di Felisatti, J.R. Flores	Loris Cerrone	4:28
3.	"Touché"	Di Felisatti, J.R. Flores	Gian Pietro Felisatti, Santanoe	2:41
4.	"Veneno"	Loris Cerrone, J.R. Flores	Loris Cerrone	4:35
5.	"Isla del sol"	Di Felisatti, J.R. Flores	Gian Pietro Felisatti, Santanoe	3:55
6.	"Hombres al Borde de un Ataque de Celos"	J.R. Flores	Gian Pietro Felisatti, Santanoe	2:57
7.	"No puedo más"	Di Felisatti, J.R. Flores	Gian Pietro Felisatti, Santanoe	3:50
8.	"Miel y limón (On the rocks)"	Rita Lee, Roberto De Carvalho, J.R. Flores	Loris Cerrone	3:53
9.	"Vivir a dos"	Loris Cerrone, J.R. Flores	Loris Cerrone	3:53
10.	"Entre mujer y marido"	Di Felisatti, J.R. Flores	Gian Pietro Felisatti, Santanoe	3:11

=== Brazilian edition ===
No.	Title	Writer(s)	Producer(s)	Length
1.	"Todas (Hola)" (Portuguese version)	Loris Cerrone, J.R. Flores, Claudio Rabello	Loris Cerrone	3:03
2.	"Imposible amrte como yo"	Di Felisatti, J.R. Flores	Loris Cerrone	4:28
3.	"Touché"	Di Felisatti, J.R. Flores	Gian Pietro Felisatti, Santanoe	2:41
4.	"Veneno"	Loris Cerrone, J.R. Flores	Loris Cerrone	4:35
5.	"Isla del sol"	Di Felisatti, J.R. Flores	Gian Pietro Felisatti, Santanoe	3:55
6.	"Hey, hey (Hombres al borde de un ataque de celos)" (Portuguese version)	J.R. Flores, Claudio Rabello	Gian Pietro Felisatti, Santanoe	3:15
7.	"Não somos iguais (No puedo más)" (Portuguese version)	Di Felisatti, J.R. Flores, Claudio Rabello	Gian Pietro Felisatti, Santanoe	3:45
8.	"Miel y limón (On the rocks)"	Rita Lee, Roberto De Carvalho, J.R. Flores	Loris Cerrone	3:53
9.	"Grito de paixão (Vivir a dos)" (Portuguese version)	Loris Cerrone, J.R. Flores, Claudio Rabello	Loris Cerrone	3:40
10.	"Entre mujer y marido"	Di Felisatti, J.R. Flores	Gian Pietro Felisatti, Santanoe	3:11

== Production ==
- Producers: Loris Cerrone and Gian Pietro Felisatti
- Director: Gian Pietro Felisatti
- Recording at Baby Studios (Milan), Cerroni (Bologna), Eurosonic (Madrid) and Torres Sonido (Madrid)
- Musical arrangements: Loris Cerrone, Gian Pietro Felisatti and Santanoe
- Sound engineers: Loris Cerrone and Másimo Noé
- Voice engineer and mix: José Antonio Alvarez Alija
- Graphic design: Antonio M. Parra
- Stylist and look: Manolo Mora

== Singles ==
Spanish

- "Hombres al borde de un ataque de celos"
- "Hola"
- "No puedo más"
- "Isla del Sol"
- "Imposible amarte como yo"
- "Entre mujer y marido"

Portuguese

- "Hey, hey"
- "Não somos iguais"
- "Todas"
- "Grito de paixão"

=== Singles charts ===
Title	Mexico	Argentina	Colombia	Costa Rica	Guatemala	Nicaragua	Panama	Peru	US Latin	Venezuela
"Hombres al borde de un ataque de celos"	1	1	1	1	1	1	1	1	1	1
"Isla del Sol"	1	31	8	5	10	5	5	4	30	10
"No puedo más"	5	—	15	10	5	4	10	11	20	9
"Imposible amarte como yo"	1	21	9	6	9	2	2	10	21	8
