= Karma Kamaleón =

Studio album by Yuri
- Released: 1984
- Recorded: 1984
- Genre: Pop
- Label: Discos Gamma
- Producer: Rafael Trabucchelli

Yuri chronology
Yuri: Sí, soy así (1983)	Karma Kamaleón (1984)	Yo te pido amor (1985)

Karma Kamaleón is the fifth album by Mexican pop singer Yuri. It was released in 1984. This album received Platinum and Gold discs for sales over 700,000 copies. The title track is a Spanish language version of the hit by Culture Club, "Karma Chameleon".

== Track listings ==
=== Latin America edition ===
No.	Title	Writer(s)	Producer(s)	Length
1.	"Sombras de ayer"	M. Larami, Digastaldo	Rafael Trabucchelli	3:55
2.	"Perdona amor"	M. Larami, Difelisatti	Rafael Trabucchelli	3:45
3.	"Ciao, cariño, ciao (Ciao, amore, ciao)"	A. Nuti, C. Loris, Adap. I. Ballesteros	Rafael Trabucchelli	3:46
4.	"Tra la la"	Lenny Macaluso, Adap. A. Jarrin	Rafael Trabucchelli	2:58
5.	"Quiero ser"	Omar Alfano	Rafael Trabucchelli	3:00
6.	"Deja a un lado tu timidez"	Jesús Glück	Rafael Trabucchelli	3:09
7.	"No sé que tienes tú"	I. Ballesteros, Difelisatti, R. Gigo	Rafael Trabucchelli	2:30
8.	"Que será (Ci sara)"	C. Minellono, D. Farina	Rafael Trabucchelli	3:33
9.	"Karma Kamaleon (Karma Chameleon)"	O`Dowd, Moss, Craig, Hay, Pickett; adap. E. del Pozo	Rafael Trabucchelli	4:10
10.	"Ni tu, ni yo"	I. Ballesteros, Digastaldo	Rafael Trabucchelli	3:20

=== Spain edition ===
Ni tu, ni yo

No.	Title	Writer(s)	Producer(s)	Length
1.	"Sombras de ayer"	M. Larami, Digastaldo	Rafael Trabucchelli	3:55
2.	"Perdona amor"	M. Larami, Difelisatti	Rafael Trabucchelli	3:45
3.	"Ciao, cariño, ciao (Ciao, amore, ciao)"	A. Nuti, C. Loris, Adap. I. Ballesteros	Rafael Trabucchelli	3:46
4.	"Tra la la"	Lenny Macaluso, Adap. A. Jarrin	Rafael Trabucchelli	2:58
5.	"Quiero ser"	Omar Alfano	Rafael Trabucchelli	3:00
6.	"Deja a un lado tu timidez"	Jesús Glück	Rafael Trabucchelli	3:09
7.	"No sé que tienes tú"	I. Ballesteros, Difelisatti, R. Gigo	Rafael Trabucchelli	2:30
8.	"No se que pasa"	F. Romero	Rafael Trabucchelli	3:02
9.	"Hoy me siento libre"	Jesús Glück	Rafael Trabucchelli	3:09
10.	"Ni tu, ni yo"	I. Ballesteros, Digastaldo	Rafael Trabucchelli	3:20

== Production ==
- Producer: Rafael Trabucchelli
- Musical arrangements: Rafael Trabucchelli
- Country of recording: Spain

== Singles ==
1. "Karma Kamaleon"
2. "No sé que tienes tú"
3. "No se que pasa" (only in Spain)
4. "Ciao, cariño, ciao"
