= Aire (Yuri album) =

Studio album by Yuri
- Released: November 22, 1987
- Recorded: 1987
- Genre: Pop
- Label: EMI Music

Yuri chronology
Un corazón herido (1986)	Aire (1987)	Isla del Sol (1988)

Aire (Air) is the eighth album by Mexican pop singer Yuri, released on November 22, 1987. It has sold over 700,000 copies and was certified Platinum. Yuri promoted the album with the Aire Tour, sponsored by Coca-Cola.

In the United States, the album reached No. 8 on the Billboard Latin Pop Albums chart.

== Track listing ==
No.	Title	Writer(s)	Producer(s)	Length
1.	"Cuando baja la marea"	J. de Florez, Difelisatti	Gian Pietro Felisatti	3:57
2.	"Qué te pasa"	J. de Florez, Difelisatti	Gian Pietro Felisatti	3:08
3.	"Entre dos aguas"	Consuelo Arango, Difelisatti	Gian Pietro Felisatti	3:08
4.	"Piedad"	Consuelo Arango, Difelisatti	Santa-Noé	3:43
5.	"Tonto"	J. de Florez	Loris Ceroni	3:27
6.	"Amores clandestinos"	Consuelo Arango, Difelisatti	Gian Pietro Felisatti	4:10
7.	"Cartas"	Luis Carlos Esteban	Santa-Noé	2:54
8.	"Bubalú"	J. de Florez	Loris Ceroni	3:46
9.	"Comediantes"	Consuelo Arango, Difelisatti	Loris Ceroni	3:20
10.	"Amo"	Consuelo Arango	Loris Ceroni	3:13

== Production ==
- Executive producer: Miguel Blasco
- Art director: Miguel Blasco
- Director: Gian Pietro Felisatti
- Musical arrangements: Gian Pietro Felisatti, Loris Ceroni and Santa-Noé
- Recording studio: Eurosonic (Madrid) / Baby Studios (Milan) / CRS (Bologna)
- Sound engineer: José Antonio Alvarez Alija
- Additional engineer: Massimo Noé, Loris Ceroni
- Mixed at Estudios Torres Sonido
- Photography: Antonio Parra
- Graphic design: ZEN
- Stylist: Manolo Batista

== Singles ==
1. "Qué te pasa"
2. "Cuando baja la marea"
3. "Amores Clandestinos"

=== Singles charts ===
Title	Mexico	Argentina	Colombia	Costa Rica	Guatemala	Nicaragua	Peru	US Latin	Venezuela
"Qué te pasa"	1	1	1	1	1	1	1	1	1
"Cuando baja la marea"	1	20	2	3	1	1	2	12	5
