= Espejos del Alma =

Studio album by Yuri
- Released: September 12, 1995
- Recorded: 1995
- Genre: Latin pop
- Label: Sony Latin; Columbia
- Producer: Alejandro Zepeda; Carlos Murguía

Yuri chronology
Reencuentros (1994)	Espejos del Alma (1995)	Más Fuerte que la Vida (1996)

Espejos del Alma (Mirrors of the Soul) is the fifteenth studio album by Mexican singer Yuri. It was released on September 12, 1995, through Sony Music Latin and Columbia Records. It was produced by Alejandro Zepeda and Carlos Murguía. The album was not as successful as her previous records, due to the personal and professional struggles at the time.

== History ==
In February 1995, Yuri attended the 1995 Viña del Mar International Song Festival, where she met with Rodrigo Espinosa, vocalist of the Chilean group Aleste, with whom she would later marry. At that time, the rhythm of work devastated the singer's health, and when she began to record the album, she was diagnosed with cancer on her vocal cords, but it was treated and healed. During this time, she declared that promiscuity was a principal part of her sexual life and alcohol. Due to this, she had a breakdown and tried to kill herself; this situation made her leave Catholicism and become a Christian.

== Singles and commercial performance ==
The first single, "De qué te vale fingir" was another hit, topping the charts in Mexico and Panama. However, due to Yuri's conversion to Evangelicalism, the record label didn't provide enough promotion to the album, becoming one of Yuri's least successful albums to date.

== Track listing ==
No.	Title	Writer(s)	Producer(s)	Length
1.	"Ojos que no ven"	Rudy Pérez	Alex Zepeda, Carlos Murguía	3:47
2.	"De qué te vale fingir"	Manuel Pacho, Rosa Salcedo	Alex Zepeda, Carlos Murguía	4:42
3.	"Qué sabes tu del amor (Meaning of love)"	Barlow, Adap. Alex Zepeda	Alex Zepeda, Carlos Murguía	4:25
4.	"Ni una lágrima (Possiamo realizzare I nostri sogni)"	G. Galgani, T. Montelpare	Alex Zepeda, Carlos Murguía	3:45
5.	"Estoy enamorada"	Carlos Murguía	Alex Zepeda, Carlos Murguía	4:58
6.	"Engáñame"	Rudy Pérez	Alex Zepeda, Carlos Murguía	4:37
7.	"Mueve tu cuerpo"	Francesco Tradardi	Alex Zepeda, Carlos Murguía	3:52
8.	"De amante a señora"	Manuel Pacho, Rosa Salcedo	Alex Zepeda, Carlos Murguía	3:25
9.	"La última en saberlo (The Last to Know)"	B. Nalsh, P. Galdstone, Adap. Rudy Pérez	Alex Zepeda, Carlos Murguía	4:35
10.	"Qué me va a pasar (I can't keep my hands of you) "	Kid Coco, Adap. Alex Zepeda	Alex Zepeda, Carlos Murguía	4:22

== Production ==
- Executive producer: Fernando Figueroa
- Director: Alex Zepeda
- Musical arrangements: Alex Zepeda and Carlos Murguía
- Musicians: Michael Landau, José Hernández, Carlos Murguía, Alex Zepeda, Nando Hernández, John Harrison, Peter Strawvack, Leo Carrot
- Backing vocals: Mariana Rivera, Renata Rivera, Alfredo Calderón, Carlos Murguía, Alex Zepeda
- Recorded in: AZTECH Lab. Estudios, Westlake Audio, L.A., Ca.
- Mix engineer: Chris Brooke and Tony Meado
- Mastering: Bernie Grundman Mastering by Chris Brooke
- Art direction: Rocio Larrazolo
- Graphic design: Alicia V. Sodi and César Saldaña
- Photography: Carlos Somonte
- Make up: Eduardo Arias and Eduardo Gasset
