= Huellas =

Studio album by Yuri
- Released: March 1, 1998
- Recorded: 1997–1998
- Genres: Pop; Gospel music
- Label: Polygram

Yuri chronology
Mi Testimonio(Special) (1997)	Huellas (1998)	Que tu fe nunca muera (2000)

Huellas (English: Traces) is the 17th studio album by Mexican pop singer Yuri. It was released in 1998. It sold more than 200,000 copies earning 2 Gold discs.

== Reception ==
Yuri comes back to the public view with this album of inspirational style under the supervision of Polygram. This is a foray into Gospel music, pop, hip hop and blues. Four singles were extracted:"¿Y tú como estás?" (How are you?), "Soy Feliz" (I'm happy), "Ven y tócame" (Come and touch me) and "Hoy que estamos juntos" (Today we are together). She achieves to chart in the first spots of the Religious radio stations with her songs: "Jesucristo" (Jesus Christ), "María Magdalena" (Mary Magdalene), "El milagro" (The miracle) and "Deja al amor fluir" (Let love flow). She creates polemic and controversy in the Mexican news because of her radical prudery, leaving behind the femme fatale image, since that representation didn't match with her then-style of religious. With this album, she announced an indefinite cease to her career in order to dedicate her time to divulge God's word and welfare.

It reached No. 12 in Pop Latin Albums in Billboard.

== Track listing ==
No.	Title	Writer(s)	Producer(s)	Length
1.	"¿Y tú cómo estás? (E tu come stai)"	Claudio Baglioni	Alex Zepeda, Arturo Pérez	4:12
2.	"Soy feliz (Summer Breeze)"	J. Seals, D. Crofts	Alex Zepeda, Arturo Pérez	3:45
3.	"Hoy que estamos juntos (Non amarmi)(Ft. Rodrigo Espinoza)"	A. Baldi, G. Bigazzi, M. Falagiani	Alex Zepeda, Arturo Pérez	4:26
4.	"El latir de tu corazón"	K. Boycet, T. Cooper, B. Cooper	Alex Zepeda, Arturo Pérez	4:16
5.	"El milagro"	Marcos Vidal	Alex Zepeda, Arturo Pérez	5:41
6.	"Jesucristo"	Roberto Carlos	Alex Zepeda, Arturo Pérez	3:35
7.	"Huellas"	Alabína	Alex Zepeda, Arturo Pérez	3:35
8.	"La montaña"	Roberto Carlos	Alex Zepeda, Arturo Pérez	4:57
9.	"Ven y tócame (Tocar voce)"	Torcuato Mariano	Alex Zepeda, Arturo Pérez	3:55
10.	"Deja el amor fluir"	Crystal Lewis, Brian Ray	Alex Zepeda, Arturo Pérez	5:28
11.	"Mi familia"	Patty Cabrera, Bob Parr	Alex Zepeda, Arturo Pérez	3:55
12.	"María Magdalena"	Yuri, M. Pacho	Alex Zepeda, Arturo Pérez	4:42

== Production ==
- Producer: Alejandro Zepeda
- Musical arrangements: Alex Zepeda and Arturo Pérez
- Musicians: Arturo Pérez, Michael Landau, Neil Stubenhouse, Alex Zepeda, Phenix Horns
- Backing vocals: Kanny O'Brian, Carlos Murguía, Leyla Hoyle, María del Rey
- Recorded in: Z. LAB, Mexico, Westlake (A) Audio, Castle Oaks, Westlake (D)
- Mix engineer: Antonio Canasio
- Mastering: Bernie Grundman
- Art direction: Arturo Medellín, Manuel Calderón
- Photography: Adolfo Pérez Butron
- Graphic design: Ulises Quezada

== Singles ==
=== Non-Christian charts ===
- ¿Y Tú Cómo Estás?
- Soy feliz
- Hoy que estamos juntos (Duet with Rodrigo, her husband)
- Ven y tócame

=== Christian radio stations ===
- María Magdalena
- Jesucristo
- El Milagro
- Deja al amor fluir

== Charts ==
=== Single charts ===
#	Title	Mexico	United States Tropical/Salsa	United States Lat. Songs	Costa Rica	Venezuela	Colombia	Guatemala	Nicaragua	Peru
1.	"¿Y Tú Cómo Estás?"	#1	#10	#8	#1	#1	#1	#1	#1	#1
2.	"Soy Feliz"	#10	-	-	#20	#15	#16	#10	#4	#19
3.	"Hoy que estamos juntos"	#5	-	-	#21	#20	#25	#19	#10	#29
4.	"Ven y tócame"	#15	-	-	#22	#29	#30	#26	#20	#35

=== Album charts ===
Year	Mexico	United States Lat.Alb	United States Lat.Pop
1998	#1	#28	#12
