= Esperanzas =

Studio album by Yuri
- Released: 1980
- Genre: Pop
- Labels: Discos Gamma, Profono Internacional
- Producer: Julio Jaramillo

Yuri chronology
Tú Iluminas mi Vida (1978)	Esperanzas (1980)	Llena de dulzura (1981)

Esperanzas (Hopes) is the second album by Mexican pop singer Yuri, released in 1980 when she was sixteen years old.

== Track listing ==
No.	Title	Writer(s)	Producer(s)	Length
1.	"Primer amor"	D. Vaona, I.Ballesteros	D. Vaona, Rafael Trabucchelli	3:30
2.	"Goma de mascar"	E. Milian	Rafael Trabucchelli, Agustín Serrano	3:35
3.	"Esperanzas"	P. José Herrero Pozo	Rafael Trabucchelli, Agustín Serrano	4:03
4.	"Bailad (The Clapping Song)"	L. Chose	Rafael Trabucchelli, Agustín Serrano	2:25
5.	"Regresarás"	C. Puerto, T. Luz	Rafael Trabucchelli, Agustín Serrano	2:54
6.	"Eso que llaman amor"	Nacho Méndez	Rodrigo Alvarez	3:11
7.	"Ease on down the road"	Charlie Small, Adap. Raúl Bermejo	Rodrigo Alvarez	2:43
8.	"Si me recuerdas tú (If you remember me)"	C. Bayer Sager, M. Hamlisch, Adap. I. Ballesteros	Julio Jaramillo	2:48
9.	"Nunca he sido tan feliz"	Bebu Silvetti, Miguel Tottis	Bebu Silvetti, Julio Jaramillo	4:14
10.	"Nuestro día"	Lolita de la Colina	Rodrigo Alvarez	3:08

== Singles ==
1. Esperanzas/Bailad (The Clapping Song)
2. Primer Amor
3. Regresarás
4. Goma de mascar

== Sales ==
1. Gold - Mexico 150,000 copies
2. Gold - Venezuela 150,000 copies (first gold album outside Mexico)
