= Enamorada (Yuri album) =

Studio album by Yuri
- Released: 2002
- Recorded: 2002
- Genre: Pop
- Length: 44:11
- Label: Muxxic
- Producer: Alejandro Zepeda

Yuri chronology
Que tu fe nunca muera (2000)	Enamorada (2002)	Yuri/A lo Mexicano (2004)

Enamorada (English: Enamored) is the 19th studio album by Mexican pop singer Yuri. It was released in 2002, and sold more than 45,000.

== Reception ==
Yuri comes back to the secular public view with this album under the supervision of Muxxic Latina. With this album she tries to return to her time-worn Pop, ballad, and R&B roots, but without leaving her fanatical religious belief. Her first single "Ya no vives en mí" ("You don't live in me anymore") was well received in radio stations, especially in Chile and Central America, however in Mexico cataclysmically failed in the charts due to little promotion from the label; Yuri left the label for Sony Music.

== Track listing ==
Tracks :

== Track listing ==
No.	Title	Writer(s)	Producer(s)	Length
1.	"Ya no vives en mí"	Fato	Alex Zepeda, Hugo Warnholtz, Joan Romagoza	3:45
2.	"De tus besos"		Alex Zepeda, Hugo Warnholtz, Joan Romagoza	4:28
3.	"Hasta que vuelva a mí"		Alex Zepeda, Hugo Warnholtz, Joan Romagoza	3:45
4.	"Se dice fácil"	Armando Manzanero	Alex Zepeda, Hugo Warnholtz, Joan Romagoza	4:05
5.	"¿Quién te ha pedido amor?"	Manuel Pancho	Alex Zepeda, Hugo Warnholtz, Joan Romagoza	4:22
6.	"Ya no respiro de ti"		Alex Zepeda, Hugo Warnholtz, Joan Romagoza	4:20
7.	"Enamorada"		Alex Zepeda, Hugo Warnholtz, Joan Romagoza	4:25
8.	"Y sentir"		Alex Zepeda, Hugo Warnholtz, Joan Romagoza	3:57
9.	"Quédate"		Alex Zepeda, Hugo Warnholtz, Joan Romagoza	3:57
10.	"¡Ay qué linda es la vida!"		Alex Zepeda, Hugo Warnholtz, Joan Romagoza	3:29
11.	"Baile caliente"		Alex Zepeda, Hugo Warnholtz, Joan Romagoza	3:33

== Production ==
- Executive production: Marco A. Rubí
- Producción and management: Alex Zepeda
- Label: Muxxic Latina
- Musical arrangements: Hugo Warnholtz, Joan Romagoza and Alex Zepeda
- Musicians: Michael Landau (electric guitar), Neil Stubenhouse (bass guitar), Charlie King (acoustic guitars), Joan Romagoza (acoustic guitars), Jaime De la Parra (acoustic guitar), Hugo Warnholtz (acoustic piano), Alex Zepeda (drums and percussion), L.A. Philharmonic Orchestra (strings), Tony Concepcion (trumpet), Jim Hacker (trumpet), Jason Carder (trumpet), Dana Teboe (trombone), John Kticker (trombone)
- Backing vocals: Miriam Ubalde, Robert Wilson, Natalia Sosa, Diana Rosverit and Jorge Flores
- Recorded in: Advance Zound and One Take Miamai by Javier Carrión
- Mixing: Westlake (A) Audio By Rubén López
- Mastering: Fulter Sound by Mike Fuller
- Photography: Adolfo Pérez Butron
- Graphic Design: Alberto Carballo
- Make up: Javier de la Rosa
- Stylist: Manuel Lupa

== Singles ==
- Ya no vives en mí
- Quién te ha pedido amor
- Hasta que vuelva a mí
- Baile Caliente (Only Chile)
- Ay que linda es la vida (Only Chile)

=== Single Charts ===
#	Title	Mexico	Costa Rica	Chile	Honduras	Guatemala	Nicaragua	Peru
1.	"Ya no vives en mí"	#45	#1	#1	#1	#1	#1	#1
2.	"Quién te ha pedido amor"	#40	-	10	#20	#10	#5	#19
3.	"Hasta que vuelva a mí"	#8	#20	#20	#25	#22	#10	#20
4.	"Baile Caliente"	#50	#45	#1	#32	#40	#1	#1
5.	"Ay que linda es la vida"	#60	#50	#1	#51	#48	#19	#9
