= Obsesiones =

Studio album by Yuri
- Released: 1992
- Recorded: 1992
- Genre: Pop
- Label: Sony Discos

Yuri chronology
Soy Libre (1990)	Obsesiones (1992)	Nueva era (1993)

Obsesiones (Obsessions) is the twelfth album by Mexican pop singer Yuri, released in 1992. It sold more than 260,000 copies, earning platinum status. ERES Magazine in Mexico chose this album among the top ten of 1992. Singer Mijares covered the song "Como te amé" for his 2009 Spanish album Vivir Así.

== Track listing ==
No.	Title	Writer(s)	Producer(s)	Length
1.	"Decir Adiós (A través de los años) (As Time Goes By)"	Herman Huffeld, Adap. Esp. Luis Gómez-Escolar	Graham Presket	3:54
2.	"Así es la vida"	D.R., Adap. Esp. Carlos Lara	Javier Losada	3:45
3.	"Yo te amaré"	Mariano Pérez, Javier Losada	Javier Losada	4:14
4.	"Este es mi chico"	Mariano Pérez, Javier Losada	Javier Losada	3:30
5.	"Como Te Amé (I'll Never Love This Way Again)"	Richard Kerr, Will Jennings, Adap. Esp. Graciela Carballo	Carlos Gómez	3:35
6.	"Poligamia"	Michael Sullivan, Paulo Massadas, Adap. Esp. Graciela Carballo	Ary Sperling	4:07
7.	"Para quererte más"	Juan Luis Guerra	Julio Teixera	3:54
8.	"Por vivir"	Mariano Pérez, Javier Losada	Javier Losada	5:10
9.	"Nadie va a extrañarte más"	Mariano Pérez, Javier Losada	Javier Losada	3:40
10.	"La mujer que soy"	Fernando Riba, Kiko Campos	Carlos Gómez	4:09
11.	"Química perfecta (Ft. Luis Enrique)"	Ángel "Cucco" Peña, Guadalupe Garcia García	Luis Enrique	4:26
12.	"Perdida"	Reinaldo Arias, Claudio Rabello, Adap. Esp. Graciela Carballo	Julio Teixera	5:15

== Production ==
- Producer: Mariano Pérez Bautista
- Producer "Química perfecta": Luis Enrique
- Production coordination: M.B.P.
- Recorded in: Sonoland, Kirios (Madrid); Lansdown House, Air Eden and CTS (London); Sony Music Mexico; Mosh (São Paulo) and Polygram (Rio de Janeiro)
- Recording engineer: Adrian Kerridge, Crispin Dibble, Pedro García, Josafat Neri, Bob Painter, Isaias García, Marcus Adrian and Scott Dillit
- Mix engineer: Bob Painter, Adrian Kerridge and Carlos Martos
- Recorded in London by string: Gavin Wright (Leader)
- Musicians on "Decir adiós (A través de los años)": London Big Band
- London Big Band musicians: Ralf Salmin (Drums); Paul Westwood (Double bass); Julian Carter, Clifford Ansell, Andy Rader and Keith Powell (Trumpets); Hal Gottlieb, Paul Lawrence and Tomas Gorrel (Saxophones); George Warren, John Wake and Charles Mann (Trombones); Graham Presket (Piano) and Tonia Duwall (Avisadora)
- Musical arrangements: Graham Presket, Javier Losada, Carlos Gómez, Julio Teixera and Ary Sperling
- Musicians: Charly Morgan and Caesar Cesina (Drums); Andy Paskt and Fernandiñho Souza (Bass); Nigel Jenkins Micht Dalton, Victor Biglioni, and Rogerio Meanda (Guitars), Manolo Morales (Saxophone) and Mariano Pérez (Percussion)
- Backing vocals: Zarabanda, Ana Cirre, Angeles Soto, Pedro Núñez y Mariano Pérez
- Backing vocals in "Por vivir": Coral of the Conservatory of Mexico
- Schedules in Madrid (Spain) by: Javier Losada
- Programming made in Rio de Janeiro (Brazil) by: Ary Sperling
- Mixed digitally in Madrid (Spain) by: Mariano Pérez
- "Decir adiós (A través de los años)" Mixed at: CTS London by Adrian Kerridge and Mariano Pérez
- Art director: Arturo Medellín
- Graphic design: Rocio Larrazolo
- Photos: Carlos Somonte
- Stylist: Gabriela D'Aque
- Make-up: Alan Simancas

== Singles ==
- "Decir adiós (A Traves de los años)"
- "Química Perfecta" (feat. Luis Enrique)
- "Así es la vida"
- "Poligamia"
- "Este es mi chico"
- "Nadie va a extrañarte más" (Chile only)
- "Como te amé"

=== Chart positions ===
#	Title	Mexico	Hot Lat.	Costa Rica	Venezuela	Colombia	Guatemala	Peru	Panama
1.	"Decir Adios"	#1	n/a	#6	#5	#10	#5	#10	#1
2.	"Química Perfecta"	#1	n/a	#1	#1	#1	#1	#1	#1
3.	"Así es la vida"	#5	n/a	n/a	n/a	n/a	#10	#23	n/a
4.	"Poligamia"	#10	#11	n/a	n/a	n/a	n/a	n/a	#10
5.	"Como te amé"	#1	#34	#5	#5	#2	#3	#9	#1
