= Que tu fe nunca muera =

Studio album by Yuri
- Released: 2000
- Recorded: 2000
- Genre: Ranchera; Gospel music
- Label: RCA International
- Producer: Rodrigo Espinoza

Yuri chronology
Huellas (1998)	Que tu fe nunca muera (2000)	Enamorada (2002)

Alternative cover
- Optional Cover

Que tu fe nunca muera (English: May your faith never die) is the 18th studio album by Mexican pop singer Yuri. It was released in 2000 and produced by her husband Rodrigo Espinoza.

== Reception ==
Yuri openly demonstrates with this album her evangelistic faith with a style of rancheras and gospel music. However, this album did not succeed in the stores nor secular radio stations, but it gathered success in Christian radio stations. It sold more than 25,000.

== Track listing ==
No.	Title	Writer(s)	Length
1.	"Su venida"		2:35
2.	"Que tu fe nunca muera"		3:16
3.	"María Magdalena"	Yuri, M. Pacho	4:09
4.	"Sendero de amor"		2:46
5.	"Sáciame de tu amor"		3:05
6.	"Canciones de salvación"		2:02
7.	"Yo buscaba"		2:59
8.	"Volver a empezar"	Rudy Pérez	5:18
9.	"Machálo"		2:23
10.	"Puedo ver"		3:53
