= Nueva era (Yuri album) =

Nueva Era

Studio album by Yuri
- Released: October 19, 1993
- Recorded: 1993
- Genre: Pop
- Label: CBS International
- Producer: Alex Zepeda

Yuri chronology
Obsesiones (1992)	Nueva Era (1993)	Reencuentros (1994)

Nueva Era (New Era) is the 13th album by the Mexican pop singer Yuri. It was released on October 19, 1993.

== Track listing ==
No.	Title	Writer(s)	Producer(s)	Length
1.	"Yo sé"	E. Morgeson, H. Boone, M. Resto, S. Fernández, Adap. Alex Zepeda	Alejandro Zepeda	4:35
2.	"Amiga mía"	Horacio Lanzi	Alejandro Zepeda	4:26
3.	"Mi amor es para tí"	E. Morgeson, R. Hilliard, M. Resto, Miguel Tomás Lucio, S. Fernández	Alejandro Zepeda	4:14
4.	"Detrás de Mi Ventana"	Ricardo Arjona	Alejandro Zepeda	4:45
5.	"Un poco más cerca"	Vanni, D'Onofrio, Alex Zepeda	Alejandro Zepeda	4:55
6.	"Música y lágrimas (Musica e lagrimas)"	Claudio Rabelo, Reynaldo Arias, Adap. Alex Zepeda	Alejandro Zepeda	4:27
7.	"Entiende de una vez"	Enrique García, Adap. Raúl Tornel y Alex Zepeda	Alejandro Zepeda	3:48
8.	"El ritmo de mi puerto (Deixa Pra La)"	Luis Caldas, Paulinho Caldas, Adap. Adap. Raúl Tornel y Alex Zepeda	Alejandro Zepeda	4:26
9.	"Si falta el amor"	Carlos Lara	Alejandro Zepeda	4:00
10.	"Celia Mix: Bemba colora/El yerbero moderno/Quimbara"	Luis Claf, Néstor Mili, Junior Cepeda	Alejandro Zepeda	6:48
11.	"Agradecimientos"	Yuri	Alejandro Zepeda	2:16

== Production ==
- Producer and director: Alejandro Zepeda
- Production coordinator: Fernando Figueroa
- Recording engineer: Daren J. Klein
- Rhythm arrangements: Alejandro Zepeda and Aaron Zigman
- Horn arrangements: Jerry Hey, Gary Grant, Aaron Zigman, Alex Zepeda
- String arrangements: Aaron Zigman and Alex Zepeda
- Keyboards: David Garfield, Robert Palmer, Aaron Zigman, Randy Kerber, Carlos Murguía, Alex Zepeda
- Additional keyboards: Jerry Knight, Aaron Zigman and Alex Zepeda
- Bass: Neil Stubenhaus, Aaron Zigman, Jerry Knight, Randy Kerber, and Alex Zepeda
- Guitars: Michael Landau, David Williams and Jerry Knight
- Drums: Alejandro Zepeda
- Percussion: Michael Fisher and Alejandro Zepeda
- Brass section: Jerry Hey, Gary Grant, Bill Reikhenbach and Dave "Rev" Boruff
- Trumpet: Gary Grant
- Saxophone: Dave "Rev" Boruff
- Background vocals: Kenny O'Bryan, Jerry Knight, Daniel Indart and Alex Zepeda
- Programming: Alejandro Zepeda, Erick Hanson, Gary Grant, Randy Kerber Robert Palmer, Aaron Zigman
- Recording studios: Conway Studios, Sunset Sound, Westlake Audio, Pacifique Recording Studios, Corner Stone Recorders, Risk Sound Studios and Zigzoo Animal Sound
- Auxiliary engineers: Gil Morales, Ken Deranteriasian, Bryan Carrigan and Rich Hasal
- Mixing engineer: Daren J. Klein
- Production assistant: Camille Henrry
- Production coordination: Aaron Zigman, Diana Tello and Alex Zepeda
- Additional equipment: Design FX, Drum Doctors, West Audio FX, STS Rentals
- Mastering: Tower Mastering (Capitol) by Wally Traugott
- Photographer: Enrique Badulescu
- Art director: Arturo Medellín
- Graphic design: Rocio Larrazolo
- Scanning: D.G. Jorge Ruiz
- Make-up: White Paco

== Singles ==
- Detrás de mi ventana
- Yo sé
- Amiga mia
- Si falta el amor
- Celia Mix (Bemba colora/El yerbero moderno/Quimbara)

=== Single charts ===
#	Title	Mexico	Hot Lat.	C.R	Venezuela	Colombia	Guatemala	Nic.	Peru	Panama
1.	"Detrás de Mi Ventana"	#1	#1	#1	#1	#1	#1	#1	#1	#1
2.	"Amiga Mia"	#1	#9	#1	#1	#1	#1	#1	#1	#1
