= Llena de dulzura =

Studio album by Yuri
- Released: November 25, 1981
- Recorded: 1981
- Genre: Pop
- Label: Discos Gamma

Yuri chronology
Esperanzas (1980)	Llena de dulzura (1981)	Yuri: Sí, soy así (1983)

Llena de Dulzura (Full of Sweetness) is the third album by Mexican pop singer Yuri. It was released on November 25, 1981. It was instant success and the record label went overseas to expand the "yurimania", this album hit Spain, earning the first Gold Album from Spain to a Mexican singer.

== Track listings ==
=== Spain edition ===
No.	Title	Writer(s)	Producer(s)	Length
1.	"Este amor no se toca (Questo amore non si tocca)"	G.C. Bigazzi, G. Bella, Adp. I. Ballesteros	Rafael Trabuchelli	3:55
2.	"Deja"	José María Napoleón	Julio Jaramillo	2:52
3.	"Tu y yo"	Marisol Perales, M. Cayre	Rafael Trabuchelli	2:44
4.	"Rosas y arcoiris (Roses and rainbows)"	Carole Bayer Sager, Marvin Hamlisch, Adap. I. Ballesteros	Rafael Trabuchelli	3:05
5.	"Primer amor"	D. Vaona, I.Ballesteros	D. Vaona, Rafael Trabucchelli	3:30
6.	"Maldita primavera (Maledetta primavera)"	A. Cassella, G. Savio, Adap. Luis Gómez-Escolar	Rafael Trabuchelli	3:55
7.	"Llena de dulzura"	Divaonna, M. Cayre, I. Ballesteros	Rafael Trabuchelli	2:25
8.	"Mi timidez"	José Luis Perales	Rafael Trabuchelli	3:06
9.	"Regresarás"	C. Puerto, T. Luz	Rafael Trabucchelli, Agustín Serrano	2:54
10.	"Si me recuerdas tú (If you remember me)"	C. Bayer Sager, M. Hamlisch, Adap. I. Ballesteros	Julio Jaramillo	2:48

=== Latin America edition ===
No.	Title	Writer(s)	Producer(s)	Length
1.	"Maldita primavera (Maledetta primavera)"	A. Cassella, G. Savio, Adap. Luis Gómez-Escolar	Rafael Trabuchelli	3:55
2.	"Mi timidez"	José Luis Perales	Rafael Trabuchelli	2:35
3.	"Rosas y arcoiris (Roses and rainbows)"	Carole bayer Sager, Marvin Hamlish, Adap. I. Ballesteros	Rafael Trabuchelli	3:05
4.	"Y sólo tú"	Amado Jaén, M. Clipper's	Rafael Trabuchelli	3:35
5.	"Llena de dulzura"	Divaonna, M. Cayre, I. Ballesteros	Rafael Trabuchelli	2:25
6.	"Frente a frente"	Manuel Alejandro y Ana Magdalena	Manuel Alejandro y Ana Magdalena	3:20
7.	"Este amor no se toca (Questo amore non si tocca)"	G.C. Bigazzi, G. Bella, Adp. I. Ballesteros	Rafael Trabuchelli	3:55
8.	"Te estoy queriendo tanto"	R. Soffici, Albertelli, Adap. Luis Gómez-Escolar	Rafael Trabuchelli	3:20
9.	"Tu y yo"	Marisol Perales, M. Cayre	Rafael Trabuchelli	2:40
10.	"Deja"	José María Napoleón	Julio Jaramillo	2:55
11.	"Amores solitarios (Amoureux solitaries)"	Elli Medeiros, Jacno	Rafael Trabuchelli	3:35
12.	"Menta y limón (Espero despierto la mañana)"	R. Narvaja, C. Narea	R. Narvaja, Quiroga	3:25

=== Special edition ===
No.	Title	Writer(s)	Producer(s)	Length
1.	"Maldita primavera (Maledetta primavera)"	A. Cassella, G. Savio, Adap. Luis Gómez-Escolar	Rafael Trabuchelli	3:55
2.	"Mi timidez"	José Luis Perales	Rafael Trabuchelli	2:35
3.	"Rosas y arcoiris (Roses and rainbows)"	Carole bayer Sager, Marvin Hamlish, Adap. I. Ballesteros	Rafael Trabuchelli	3:05
4.	"Y sólo tú"	Amado Jaén, M. Clipper's	Rafael Trabuchelli	3:35
5.	"Llena de dulzura"	Divaonna, M. Cayre, I. Ballesteros	Rafael Trabuchelli	2:25
6.	"El pequeño panda de Chapultepec"	Laura Gómez Llanos Barraza	Julio Jaramillo	3:30
7.	"Este amor no se toca (Questo amore non si tocca)"	G.C. Bigazzi, G. Bella, Adp. I. Ballesteros	Rafael Trabuchelli	3:55
8.	"Te estoy queriendo tanto"	R. Soficci, Albertelli, Adap. Luis Gómez-Escolar	Rafael Trabuchelli	3:20
9.	"Tu y yo"	Marisol Perales, M. Cayre	Rafael Trabuchelli	2:40
10.	"Deja"	José María Napoleón	Julio Jaramillo	2:55
11.	"Amores solitarios (Amoureux solitaries)"	Elli Madeiras, Jacno	Rafael Trabuchelli	3:35
12.	"Menta y limón (Espero despierto la mañana)"	R. Navarro, C. Narea	R. Narvaja, Quiroga	3:25

== Singles ==
1. "Maldita Primavera"
2. "Este amor ya no se toca"
3. "El Pequeño Panda de Chapultepec"
4. "Llena de dulzura"
5. "Deja"
6. "Tú y yo"

Yuri sang "El Pequeño Panda de Chapultepec" for the panda that was born in the Chapultepec Zoo.

=== Singles charts ===
Title	Mexico	Spain	Costa Rica	Venezuela	Argentina
"Maldita Primavera"	1	1	1	1	1
"Este amor ya no se toca"	1	1	—	10	—
"El Pequeño Panda de Chapultepec"	1	—	5	5	—

== Sales ==
- 360000 copies - Mexico
- 150000 copies, Gold - Spain
- 1 million copies of the single "El Pequeño Panda de Chapultepec"
