= Más Fuerte que la Vida =

Studio album by Yuri
- Released: 1996
- Recorded: 1996
- Genre: Ranchera
- Length: 58:55
- Label: Sony International

Yuri chronology
Espejos del Alma (1995)	Más Fuerte que la Vida (1996)	Mi Testimonio (1997)

Más fuerte que la vida (Stronger than life) is the 16th studio album by Mexican pop singer Yuri. It was released in 1996.

== History & Promotion ==
This is the first Ranchero album she had released. This is a collection of her past hits in a new Ranchera version and she was declared the Queen of the World Rancheras Festival. This album didn't receive proper promotion from Sony due to the "new & religious vision" of the singer. The sales were bad and the label decided to finish her contract.

== Track listing ==
No.	Title	Writer(s)	Length
1.	"De qué te vale fingir"	M. Pacho, R. Salcedo
2.	"Imposible amarte como yo"	Difelisatti, J.R. Florez
3.	"Yo te pido amor"	Difelisatti, J.R. Florez
4.	"Todo mi corazón"	Ilan Chester
5.	"Déjala"	Difelisatti, J.R. Florez
6.	"Maldita primavera (Maledetta primavera)"	A. Cassella, G. Savio, Adap. Luis Gómez-Escolar
7.	"¿Es ella más que yo?"	Difelisatti, J.R. Florez
8.	"No puedo más"	Difelisatti, J.R. Florez
9.	"Más fuerte que la vida"
10.	"Detrás de Mi Ventana"	Ricardo Arjona
11.	"Amiga mia"	Horacio Lanzi
12.	"Esperanzas"	P. José Herrero Pozo
13.	"Quien eres tú (Quem e voce) (Love will lead you back)"	Diane Warren, Nelson Motta, Adap. Karen Guindi
14.	"Me tienes que querer"	J.R. Florez

== Singles ==
- Más Fuerte Que la Vida (dedicated to Jesus)
