= Un corazón herido =

Studio album by Yuri
- Released: September 12, 1986
- Recorded: 1986
- Genre: Pop
- Label: EMI Music

Yuri chronology
Yo te pido amor (1985)	Un corazón herido (1986)	Aire (1988)

Un corazon herido (A wounded heart) is the seventh album by Mexican pop singer Yuri. It was released in 1986 by EMI Music. The album sold 250,000 copies and was certified Platinum.

== Track listing ==
No.	Title	Writer(s)	Producer(s)	Length
1.	"Un corazón herido"	J.R. Florez	Gian Pietro Felisatti, Jesús Glück	3:30
2.	"Cuidate bien"	Difelisatti, J.R, Florez	Gian Pietro Felisatti, Jesús Glück	3:05
3.	"Pesado"	Luis Carlos Esteban	Luis Carlos Esteban	3:05
4.	"Este amor"	Difelisatti, J.R, Florez	Gian Pietro Felisatti, Jesús Glück	4:40
5.	"¿Es ella más que yo?"	Difelisatti, J.R, Florez	Gian Pietro Felisatti, Jesús Glück	3:53
6.	"Hoy me he vuelto a enamorar"	E. Del Pozo	Gian Pietro Felisatti, Jesús Glück	3:15
7.	"No habrá"	Hernaldo Zúñiga	Gian Pietro Felisatti, Jesús Glück	3:50
8.	"Mañana"	Difelisatti, J.R, Florez	Gian Pietro Felisatti, Jesús Glück	3:20
9.	"Mama dame"	Difelisatti, J.R, Florez	Gian Pietro Felisatti, Jesús Glück	2:50
10.	"Vivir sin ti"	Difelisatti, J.R, Florez	Gian Pietro Felisatti, Jesús Glück	3:25

== Production ==
- Executive producer: Miguel Blasco
- Art director: Miguel Blasco
- Director: Gian Pietro Felisatti
- Musical arrangements: Gian Pietro Felisatti, Jesús Glück and Luis Carlos Esteban
- Recording studio: MILAN-BABY ESTUDIO and MADRID-EUROSONIC
- Sound engineer: J. Alvarez Alija
- Additional engineer: Alberto Pinto
- Assistant: Antonio Alvarez
- Photography: Antonio Parra
- Graphic design: ZEN
- Stylist: Manuel

== Singles ==
1. "Es ella más que yo"
2. "Mama Dame"
3. "Un Corazón Herido"

=== Singles charts ===
Title	Mexico	Argentina	Colombia	Costa Rica	Guatemala	Nicaragua	US Latin	Venezuela
"Es ella más que yo"	1	1	1	1	1	1	21	1
"Un corazón herido"	1	15	9	5	1	1	12	10
