= Yuri: Sí, soy así =

Studio album by Yuri
- Released: 1983
- Recorded: 1983
- Genre: Pop
- Label: Discos Gamma
- Producer: Julio Jaramillo

Yuri chronology
Llena de dulzura (1981)	Yuri: Sí, soy así (1983)	Karma Kamaleón (1984)

Yuri: Sí, soy así is the fourth album by Mexican pop singer Yuri. It was released in 1983.

== Track listings ==
=== Latin America edition ===
No.	Title	Writer(s)	Producer(s)	Length
1.	"Solos"	José Luis Perales	Rafael Trabucchelli, A. Serrano	3:25
2.	"Soy un garabato"	Lolita de la Colina	Rafael Trabucchelli, A. Serrano	2:20
3.	"De pequeños"	Jesús Glück	Jesús Glück, Rafael Trabucchelli	3:31
4.	"Amor de cumpleaños"	Maryní Callejo, Mari Trini	Rafael Trabucchelli, A. Serrano	2:54
5.	"¡Oh mamma!"	Maryní Callejo, Mari Trini	Rafael Trabucchelli, A Serrano	3:38
6.	"Y descubrir que te quiero"	I. Ballesteros, Rafael Trabucchelli	Rafael Trabucchelli, A. Serrano	2:57
7.	"Yo te amo, te amo (...Se t'amo t'amo)"	M. Balducci, G. Balducci, Adap. Javier Muro	Rafael Trabucchelli, A. Serrano	3:20
8.	"Vuelve"	José Luis Perales	Rafael Trabucchelli, A. Serrano	3:15
9.	"Solos tu y yo"	Jesús Glück	Jesús Glück	3:09
10.	"Canta, canta"	Lolita de la Colina	Rafael Trabucchelli, A. Serrano	3:50
11.	"Necesito de ti"	Tony Landa, Tony Cruz	Rafael Trabucchelli, A. Serrano	2:55
12.	"Atrapados"	Lolita de la Colina	Rafael Trabucchelli, A. Serrano	2:30

=== Spain edition ===
No.	Title	Writer(s)	Producer(s)	Length
1.	"Solos"	José Luis Perales	Rafael Trabucchelli, A. Serrano	3:25
2.	"Yo te amo, te amo (...Se t'amo t'amo)"	M. Balducci, G. Balducci, Adap. Javier Muro	Rafael Trabucchelli, A. Serrano	3:20
3.	"Canta, canta"	Lolita de la Colina	Rafael Trabucchelli, A. Serrano	3:50
4.	"Amor de cumpleaños"	Maryní Callejo, Mari Trini	Rafael Trabucchelli, A. Serrano	2:54
5.	"De pequeños"	Jesús Glück	Jesús Glück, Rafael Trabucchelli	3:31
6.	"Y descubrir que te quiero"	I. Ballesteros, Rafael Trabucchelli	Rafael Trabucchelli, A. Serrano	2:57
7.	"Si, soy así"	I. Ballesteros, R. Gigo	Rafael Trabucchelli, A. Serrano	2:20
8.	"Vuelve"	José Luis Perales	Rafael Trabucchelli, A. Serrano	3:15
9.	"Solos tu y yo"	Jesús Glück	Jesús Glück	3:09
10.	"¡Oh mamma!"	Maryní Callejo, Mari Trini	Rafael Trabucchelli, A. Serrano	3:38
11.	"Soy un garabato"	Lolita de la Colina	Rafael Trabucchelli, A. Serrano	2:20
12.	"Atrapados"	Lolita de la Colina	Rafael Trabucchelli, A. Serrano	2:30

== Production ==
- Producer: Rafael Trabucchelli
- Musical arrangements: Rafael Trabucchelli and A. Serrano
- Sound engineer: Angel Barco
- Country of recording: Spain

== Singles ==
1. "Yo te amo, te amo"
2. "Solos"
3. "Sólos tú y yo"
4. "Si, soy así" (only in Spain)
5. "Vuelve"
