= Soy Libre =

Studio album by Yuri
- Released: August 19, 1991
- Recorded: 1990–1991
- Genre: Pop
- Label: CBS International
- Producer: Mariano Pérez

Yuri chronology
Sui Generis (1989)	Soy Libre (1991)	Obsesiones (1992)

Soy libre (I'm free) is the 11th album by Mexican pop singer Yuri. It was released on August 19, 1991. It sold over 500,000 copies earning Gold and Platinum discs. "Soy libre" means "I'm free", the title was a result of her divorce. It reached #10 in Pop Latin Albums in Billboard.

== Track CD listing ==
No.	Title	Writer(s)	Producer(s)	Length
1.	"Carnaval de Oriente"	Hermanos Matamoros	Javier Lozada	4:20
2.	"Cosas del amor"	Jesús Monarrez	Carlos Gómez	3:22
3.	"Llévame a tu casa"	Alejandro Jaen	Bob Painter	5:25
4.	"Quién eres tú (Love Will Lead You Back)"	Diane Warren, Nelson Motta, Adap. Karen Guindi	Carlos Gómez	4:51
5.	"Cuerpo de mujer"	Mariano Pérez	Javier Lozada	3:53
6.	"No llores más corazón"	Alejandro Jean	Carlos Gómez	4:15
7.	"Todo mi corazón"	Ilan Chester	Ary Sperling	5:12
8.	"El apagón"	Manuel Esperón, E. Cortazar	Javier Lozada	3:55
9.	"Un romance"	Maurizio Fabrizio, Ronaldo Bastos, Adap. R. M. Girón	Graham Presket	4:32
10.	"Olas que vienen"	Botaminio Felipe	Ary Sperling	3:25
11.	"Soy libre"	Mariano Pérez	Javier Lozada	4:25
12.	"Sabes lo que pasa"	Mariano Pérez	Javier Lozada	3:57

== Track LP listing ==
No.	Title	Writer(s)	Producer(s)	Length
1.	"Carnaval de Oriente"	Hermanos Matamoros	Javier Lozada	4:20
2.	"Cosas del amor"	Jesús Monarrez	Carlos Gómez	3:22
3.	"Llévame a tu casa"	Alejandro Jaen	Bob Painter	5:25
4.	"Quién eres tú (Quem é voce) (Love Will Lead You Back)"	Diane Warren, Nelson Motta, Adap. Karen Guindi	Carlos Gómez	4:51
5.	"Un romance"	Maurizio Fabrizio, Ronaldo Bastos, Adap. R. M. Girón	Graham Presket	4:12
6.	"Todo mi corazón"	Ilan Chester	Ary Sperling	5:12
7.	"El apagón"	Manuel Esperón, E. Cortazar	Javier Lozada	3:55
8.	"Soy libre"	Mariano Pérez	Javier Lozada	4:25
9.	"Olas que vienen"	Botaminio Felipe	Ary Sperling	3:25
10.	"Sabes lo que pasa"	Mariano Pérez	Javier Lozada	3:57

== Track Special Edition listing ==
No.	Title	Writer(s)	Producer(s)	Length
1.	"Quién eres tú (Love Will Lead You Back)"	Diane Warren, Nelson Motta, Adap. Karen Guindi	Carlos Gómez	4:51
2.	"El apagón (Radio Edit)"	Manuel Esperón, Cortazar	Javier Lozada	3:35
3.	"Todo mi corazón"	Ilan Chester	Ary Sperling	5:12
4.	"Sabes lo que pasa"	Mariano Pérez	Javier Lozada	3:57
5.	"Un romance"	Maurizio Fabrizio, Ronaldo Bastos, Adap. R. M. Girón	Graham Presket	4:32
6.	"Llévame a tu casa"	Alejandro Jean	Bob Painter	5:25
7.	"Cosas del amor"	Jesús Monarrez	Carlos Gómez	3:22
8.	"Carnaval de Oriente"	Hermanos Matamoros	Javier Lozada	4:20
9.	"Soy libre"	Mariano Pérez	Javier Lozada	4:25
10.	"Olas que vienen"	Botaminio Felipe	Ary Sperling	3:25
11.	"No llores más corazón"	Alejandro Jean	Carlos Gómez	4:15
12.	"Cuerpo de Mujer"	Mariano Pérez	Javier Lozada	3:53
13.	"El apagón (Dance Mix)"	Manuel Esperón, Cortazar	Javier Lozada	5:25
14.	"Sabes lo que pasa (Remix)"	Mariano Pérez	Javier Lozada	6:50

== Production ==
- Producer: Mariano Pérez Bautista
- Production coordination: CRAB
- Recorded in: Round House (London)
- Engineer: Graham Daol
- Engineer at Sonoland (Madrid): Bob Painter
- Engineer in Somlibre (Rio de Janeiro): Ivan Carvacho
- String recorded in CTS (London) - Engineer: Isaías García
- Musical arrangements: Graham Presket, Bob Paiter, Ary Sperling, Carlos Gomez and Javier Lozada
- Musicians: Charly Morgan (Drums), Andy Pask (Bass), Niguel Jenkins (Guitar), Juan Cerro (Spanish and Electric guitars), Roger Meanda (Electric guitar on "Todo mi corazón"), Mitch Dalton and Ary Sperling (Acoustic guitars), Manolo Morales (Saxophone), Milton Guedes (Saxophone on "Todo mi corazón", Harmonica on "Olas que vienen"), Armando Marsal and Mariano Pérez (Percussions)
- Backing vocals: Group "Zarabanda", Mavi Pechis, Maisa Henz, José Falcón and Mariano Pérez
- Schedules in Madrid (Spain) by: Javier Lozada
- Programming in Brazil by: Ary Sperling
- Mixed at Sondland (Madrid) by: Mariano Pérez Bautista
- Art director: Arturo Medellín
- Graphic design: Karem Trétmanis
- Photos: Carlos Somonte
- Stylist: Gabriela D'Aque
- Make-up and Hairstyles: Alan Simancas

== Singles ==
- Quien Eres Tu
- Sabes Lo Que Pasa
- El Apagón
- Todo Mi Corazón
- Cosas del Amor

=== Single Charts ===
#	Title	Mexico	Hot Lat.	C.R	Venezuela	Colombia	Guatemala	Nic.	Peru	Panama
1.	"El Apagón"	#1	n/a	#1	#1	#1	#1	#1	#1	#1
2.	"Quien Eres Tu"	#1	#8	#1	#1	#1	#1	#1	#1	#1
3.	"Sabes Lo Que Pasa"	#5	n/a	n/a	n/a	n/a	#19	#10	n/a	n/a
4.	"Todo Mi Corazón"	#1	5	1	1	1	#1	#1	#1	#1
