= Inusual =

Studio album by Yuri
- Released: 2010
- Recorded: 2010
- Genre: Pop, dance-pop
- Label: Warner Music Mexico
- Producer: Scott Erickson

Yuri chronology
Mi Hijita Linda (2008)	Inusual (2010)	Mi Tributo al Festival (2011)

Inusual (Unusual) is the 23rd studio album and the 24th album by Mexican pop singer Yuri. It was released on May 22, 2010 on Warner Music. The album was produced by Scott Erickson. The album made it to number one in Mexico in the first week after its release. The album includes 8 new songs and 5 covers. In less than a month it became a gold album in Mexico.

== Track listing ==
No.	Title	Writer(s)	Producer(s)	Length
1.	"Arrepentida"	Samuel Parra "Samo", Rafael Esparza	Scott Erickson	4:10
2.	"Aire"	Josúe Contreras, Johnny Lee Rosas	Scott Erickson	3:54
3.	"Como una loba"	Carlos Rodríguez, Héctor Sotelo	Scott Erickson	3:50
4.	"Por ti (The game of love)"	Alex Papaconstantinou, Marcus Englof, Adap. Alex Zepeda	Alex Zepeda	3:00
5.	"Estoy cansada"	Mariano Maldonado	Scott Erickson	4:08
6.	"Pero te vas arrepentir"	Marco Antonio Solís	Scott Erickson	4:01
7.	"Si no estás aquí (Si te vas)"	Mariano Maldonado, Salvador Rizo	Scott Erickson	3:56
8.	"Ya para qué (Pallanadhu Pallanadhu)"	Pa Vijav, Vidya Sagar, Adap. Salvador Rizo	Scott Erickson	4:12
9.	"Pero no te olvido"	Mariano Maldonado	Scott Erickson	4:08
10.	"El amor de mi vida"	Mauricio Abaroa	Scott Erickson	3:58
11.	"Tu eres para mí (Hypnotized/Ipopta Vlemeta)"	Sofia Berntson, Adap. Alex Zepeda	Alex Zepeda	3:53
12.	"Si tu te vas"	Adolfo Angel	Scott Erickson	3:25
13.	"Fuera de mi vida"	Norberto Gurbich, Juan José Novaira	Scott Erickson	4:14

== Production ==
- A production directed and carried out by Scott Erickson to Warner Music México
- Arrangements, programming and recording: Scott Erickson
- Production manager: Cristina Abaroa
- Recording studios: SongLee Studio, LA CANADA, CA
- Assistant mixing engineer: Rafa Sardina
- Mix Studios: Afterhours, Woodland Hills, CA
- Mixing Assistant: Basilio Ramírez
- Voice of Yuri produced by: Scott Erickson and Alejandro Abaroa
- Recording of vocals and backing vocals: Scott Erickson, José Portilla and Juan Carlos Moguel in: Honky Tonk Studios
- Recording assistants: Roberto de la Peña Flores and José Luis del Hoyo
- Mastering by Tom Baker at Precision Mastering
- Musicians: Scott Erickson (Piano / Keyboards) Tim Pierce & Michael Thompson (Electric and acoustic guitars) George Doering (electric sitar) Lee Sklar (Bass) Charlie Morgan (Drums) Chris Bleth (Shehani) Assa Drori (Concertmaster)Assa Drori & Associates (Strings)
- Backing vocals: Yuri, Alejandro Abaroa, Laura Alavarez, Francis Benítez, Rene Sánchez Ramos, Alex Zepeda and Scott Erickson
- Arrangements and programming "Por ti" and "Tú eres para mí": Alex Zepeda
- References to piano for demos: Samuel Mallar
- Transcripts and Music Prep: Cristina Abaroa
- Photo: Uriel Santana
- Production of photo shoot: Verania Pérez
- Participants: Hugo Serna and Juan Carlos Martinez
- Art design: Satoshi Garibay Onodera
- Concept and production of costume: Yamily Valenzuela Canseco
- Make-up: Javier de la Rosa
- Styling: Ignacio Muñoz
- Styling Assistant: Germán Anzures
- Accessories Coordinator: Gustavo Elguerra
- Wizard of accessories: Inés Briones
- Yuri's personal assistant: Jorge Pavez Peso

== Singles ==
- Arrepentida
- Estoy cansada

== Others songs ==
In addition to the promotion of "Inusual", Yuri recorded two songs for two television series, one Mexican and other Chilean

No.	Title	Writer(s)	TV programs	Length
1.	"Con las manos atadas"	Samuel Parra "Samo"	Mujeres Asesinas 3 (Mexico)	3:36
2.	"Por el amor de un hombre"	Juan Andrés Ossandón	Infiltradas (Chilevisión)	3:57
