= Yuri/A lo Mexicano =

Yuri
- Cover to the standard edition of the album

Studio album by Yuri
- Released: 2004
- Recorded: 2004
- Genre: Ranchera
- Label: Sony Music
- Producer: Guillermo Gil

Yuri chronology
Enamorada (2002)	Yuri (2004)	Acompáñame (2006)

Alternative cover
- Second Edition

Yuri is the 20th studio album by Mexican pop singer Yuri. Released in 2004, it has sold more than 44,000 copies. This album was also released under the name A lo Mexicano. Several famous singers are featured in the album.

== Reception ==
Mexican singer Yuri sang this "ranchero" album under the Sony Music production label. Sony Music distributed the album outside of Mexico, but promoted it only within Mexico. The album was released in two editions. The first edition, called "Yuri," was distributed exclusively in Mexico, USA and Puerto Rico. The second edition, called "A lo Mexicano," was remade for distribution in South America. The song tracks in both albums are similar.

== Track listing ==
Tracks:

No.	Title	Writer(s)	Producer(s)	Length
1.	"Mi rechazo"	Marco Antonio Solís	Memo Gil	3:15
2.	"Que no quede huella (Ft.Guadalupe Esparza)"	Guadalupe Esparza	Memo Gil	3:32
3.	"El que la hace la paga"	Kietzman	Memo Gil	3:31
4.	"Tu cárcel"	Marco Antonio Solís	Memo Gil	3:27
5.	"Cosas del Amor (Ft. Ana Bárbara)"	Roberto Livi, Rudy Pérez	Memo Gil	3:20
6.	"Amor sin esperanza"	Luis Kalaff	Memo Gil	2:50
7.	"Y llegaste tú (Ft. Mijares)"		Memo Gil	4:18
8.	"Popurrí Juan Gabriel (La diferencia/Tarde/Te voy a olvidar) (Ft.Pandora)"	Juan Gabriel	Memo Gil	5:35
9.	"Así son los hombres"	Juan Gabriel	Memo Gil	3:35
10.	"No puedo más"	Di Felisatti, J.R. Flores	Memo Gil	3:33
11.	"Nada más decidete"	Juan Gabriel	Memo Gil	3:14
12.	"Cuatro vidas (Ft. Vicente Fernández)"	Justo Carreras	Memo Gil	3:42

=== Singles ===
- Mi rechazo (only Mexico and United States)
- Tu cárcel (only Peru)
- Cosas del amor (only in Colombia)
- Y llegaste tú (only in Mexico)
