= Cepillín =

Mexican clown (1946–2021)

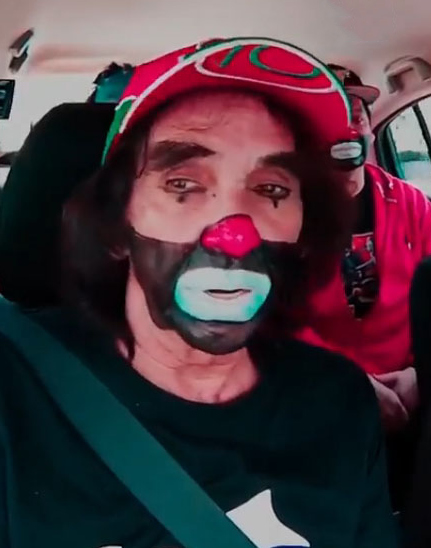
- Cepillín in 2018
- Born: Ricardo González Gutiérrez; February 7, 1946; Monterrey, Nuevo León, Mexico
- Died: March 8, 2021 (aged 75); Naucalpan, State of Mexico, Mexico
- Occupations: Clown; television personality; actor
- Years active: 1971–2021
- Spouse: Aidé Guajardo de González (m. 1976)
- Children: 3

Ricardo González Gutiérrez known as Cepillín (Spanish pronunciation: [sepiˈʝin]) (February 7, 1946 – March 8, 2021) was a Mexican clown as well as a singer, TV host and actor.

== Career ==
Ricardo was a dentist who started to paint his face so that kids would not be afraid of him as he worked on their teeth. He became famous when a local TV channel interviewed him. The name Cepillín means "Little (tooth)Brush" in Spanish (while "cepillo" means literally "brush", the origin of the nickname implies it is, in fact, referring to a toothbrush).

With Televisa he had a show called El Show de Cepillín starting in 1977. This was an educational, comedy and interview show with guests such as Lou Ferrigno (who was Hulk on the popular TV show). The show was a success in Mexico as well as Chile and Puerto Rico. He arguably became the most famous clown in Mexico and all Latin America. His show was aired in more than 18 countries.

Cepillín recorded 27 long play albums of children songs, 11 of which went gold. In all they sold more than 25 million copies worldwide. The most popular songs were La feria de Cepillín (Cepillín's Fair), Tomás ("Thomas"), En el bosque de la China (“The little Chinese forest") and La Gallina Cocoua. Cepillín also helped younger artists to acquire fame such as singer Yuri, who took a role in his movie Milagro en el circo ("Miracle in the circus"), and Salma Hayek, to whom he gave the opportunity in the masterpiece Aladdin as Jasmine.

Cepillín had another show in 1987 called Una sonrisa con Cepillín on Channel 5 of Televisa.

In 1990 he returned to Monterrey for Súper sábados con Cepillín which featured his sons Ricardo González Jr (″Cepi″) and Roberto González (″Franky″). In 2006 he and his sons recorded Cepillín live for Multimedios Television. From 1982 to 2006 he toured Mexico and the United States with a circus that bore his name.

== Political activism ==
On April 12, 2018, Cepillín uploaded a video where he endorsed Andrés Manuel López Obrador for president in the 2018 Mexican presidential election.

== Health and death ==
González Gutiérrez was a smoker and was hospitalized with heart attacks on three occasions.

Ricardo González Gutiérrez was admitted to a hospital in Naucalpan, State of Mexico, on February 28, 2021, because of intense back pain. He underwent a nine-hour surgery and seemed to be recovering, and received a visit from ″Rey Grupero″ (Luis Alberto Ordaz). However, he had chest pains and was admitted to intensive care and put on a ventillator on March 7. On March 8, 2021, Cepillín died at the age of 75 after battling spinal cancer. His son, Ricardo González Jr., said that his father had a respiratory arrest from which the doctors managed to "get him out of"; however, he reported that "he was already very deteriorated" and he had a failed kidney.

== Films ==
- 1979: Milagro en el circo
- 1989: La Corneta de mi General
- 1989 Hola Ninos de lucion

== Albums ==
- 2016: Gracias – Album nominated for the Latin Grammy
- 1998: Cepillín 15 éxitos Vol. II
- 1995: Fiesta con Cepillín
- 1994: Cepillín 15 éxitos El Payasito de la Tele
- 1991: Cepillín Fiesta con Cepillín
- 1981: Cepillín El Vaquero Infantil Pancho Lopez
- 1978: Fiebre Del Cepillín, Cepillín Night Fever
- 1978: Navidad Con Cepillín Vol. IV
- 1978: Cepillín Vamos a la escuela Vol. III
- 1978: Cepillín La Feria De Cepillín Vol. II
- 1977: Un Dia Con Mamá Vol. I
