= Mijares =

- municipality
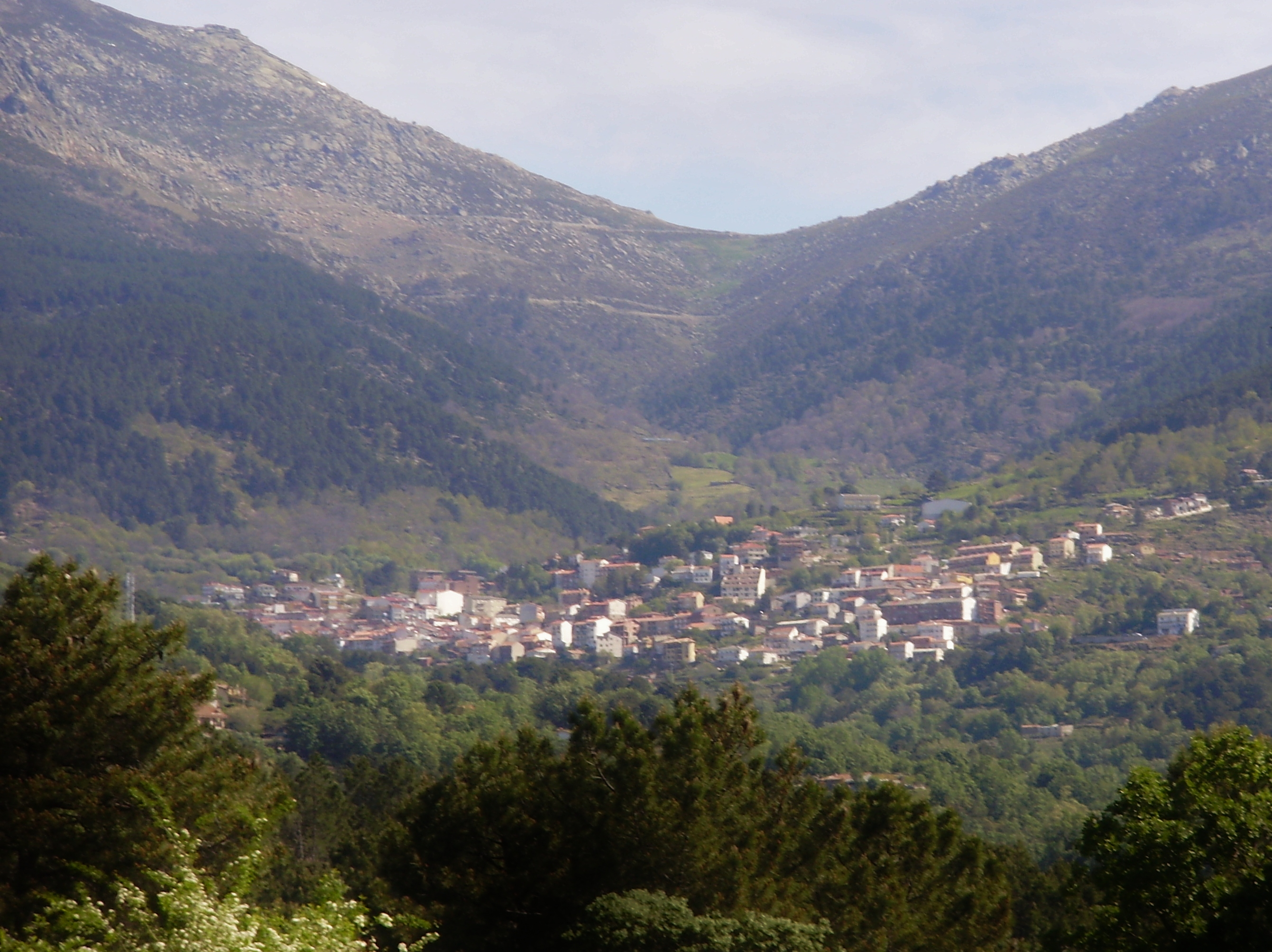
- view of Mijares

- Flag Coat of arms

- Location in Spain. Mijares (Spain)
- Coordinates: 40°17′51″N 4°50′12″W
- Country: Spain
- Autonomous community: Castile and León
- Province: Ávila
- Municipality: Mijares

Area
  - Total: 47 km^{2} (18 sq mi)

Population (2025-01-01)
  - Total: 718
  - Density: 15/km^{2} (40/sq mi)
- Time zone: UTC+1 (CET)
  - Summer (DST): UTC+2 (CEST)
- Website: Official website

Mijares is a municipality located in the province of Ávila, Castile and León, Spain.

== Population ==
Historical population
Year	Pop.	±% p.a.
2023	730	—
2024	731	+0.14%
2025	718	−1.78%
Source: INE
