= Acompáñame (album) =

Studio album by Yuri & Mijares
- Released: 25 April 2006
- Recorded: 2006
- Genre: Latin pop
- Label: Sony Music

Yuri Albums chronology
Yuri (2004)	Acompáñame (2006)	Vive la Historia (2007)

Mijares chronology
Las Número 1 de Mijares (2005)	Acompáñame (2006)

Acompáñame (English: Accompany me) is a studio album by Mexican pop singers Yuri and Mijares. Released on 25 April 2006, the idea to record together came after both had previously performed at the Auditorio Nacional in Mexico City. The album consisted mostly of some of the most beloved Spanish love songs from the 1980s. The lead single was non-cover track “Y Llegaste Tú". In interviews, Yuri stated that, “Upon the initial invitation by Mijares to record together, I felt this was the perfect moment for this record”. It went on to sell more than 100,000 earning Platinum disc.

== Reception ==
Yuri and Manuel Mijares got together and decided to make this album of covers from one of the most successful songs in Spanish from the 80's. This album reaches first place in the Mexican charts, selling more than 100,000 despite the low promotion of Sony Music. With this album Yuri regained her fame and she went on tour titled Cantar por cantar (Sing just to sing) where she performed with Mijares and Ricardo Montaner.

== Track listing ==
Tracks:

No.	Title	Writer(s)	Length
1.	"Me alimento de ti"	Gonzalo Benavides	3:16
2.	"Simplemente amor"	Amanda Miguel, Diego Verdager	3:43
3.	"Es por ti"	Teo Cardalda	4:26
4.	"Te quiero así"	Rafael Pérez Botija	3:27
5.	"Acompáñame"		3:45
6.	"Para decir adiós"		4:17
7.	"Nada personal"	Armando Manzanero	3:10
8.	"Sólo le pido a Dios"	León Gieco	3:07
9.	"Callados"	Camilo Blanes	4:49
10.	"No me puedo escapar de ti"	Juan Carlos Calderón	3:23
11.	"Amándote"		3:59
12.	"Y llegaste tú"	Leonel García, Noel Schajris	4:18

== Personnel ==
- Executive producer: Guillermo Gil
- Arrangers: Guillermo Gil; Pancho Ruiz; Eugenio Toussaint; Mario Santos
- Recording Studio: La Bodega Mexico, D. F; Westlake Audio, Los Angeles, CA.
- Musicians: Paco Rosas (Acoustic guitar, Electric guitar); Ramón Stagnaro (Acoustic guitar); Marco Antonio Santiago (Bajo sexto); Fernando de Santiago, Guillermo Gil (Didjeridu); Mario Santos (Piano and keyboards); Guillermo Gil, Beto Dominguez (Percussion)
- Audio Mixers: Juan Barbosa, Guillermo Gil
- Photographer: Carlos Latapi

== Singles ==
- Callados
- Acompáñame

== Sales and certifications ==
Region	Certification	Certified units/sales
Mexico (AMPROFON)	Platinum	100,000^{^}
^{^} Shipments figures based on certification alone.
