= Yuri (Mexican singer) =

Mexican singer (born 1964)

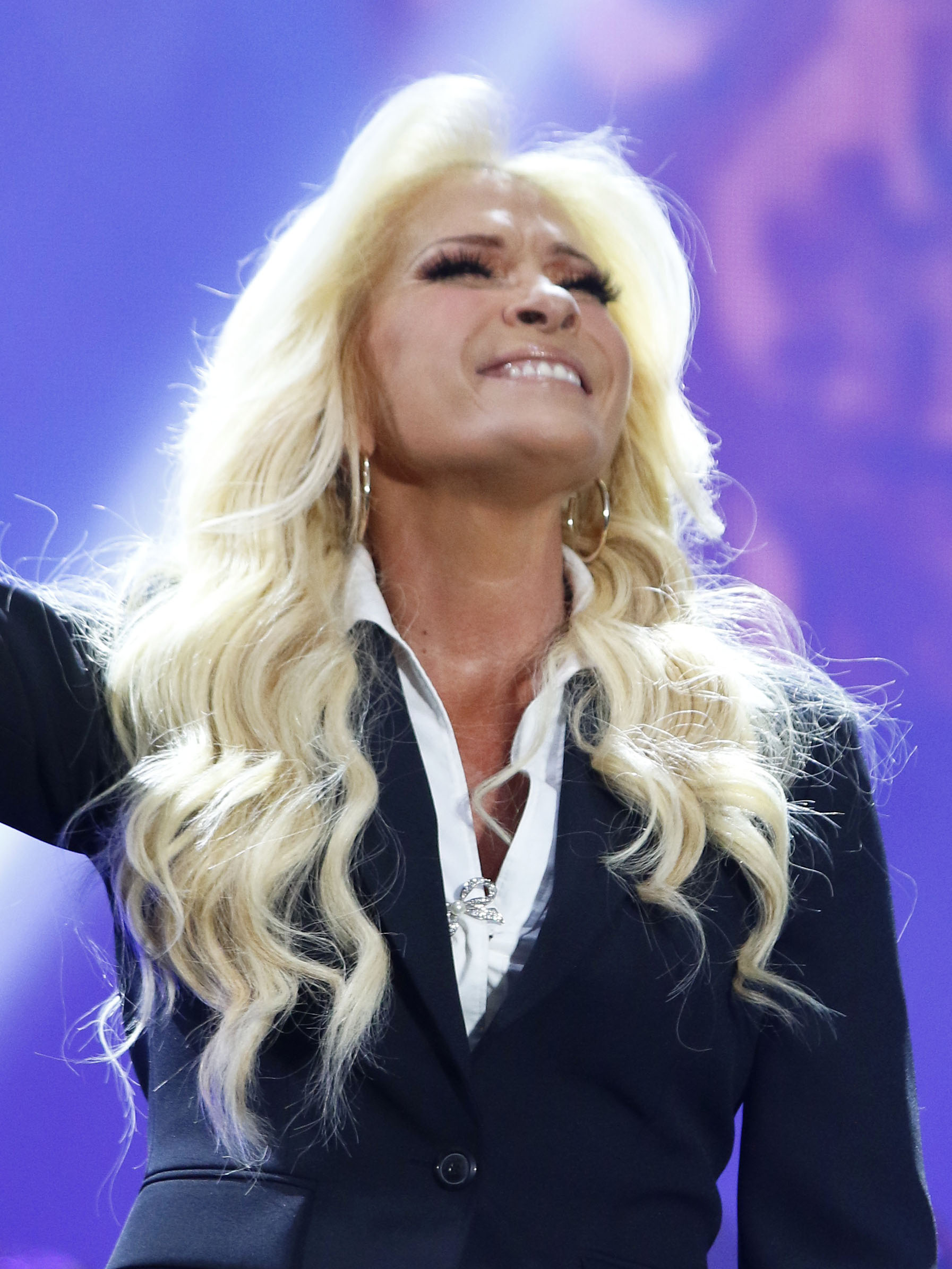
- Yuri performing at the Zócalo in 2019.
- Born: Yuridia Valenzuela Canseco; 6 January 1964 (age 62); Veracruz, Veracruz, Mexico
- Occupations: Singer; actress
- Years active: 1978–present
- Spouses: Fernando Iriarte (m. 1988; div. 1990) Rodrigo Espinoza (m. 1995)
- Children: 1
- Parents: Carlos Humberto Valenzuela (father); Dulce Canseco (mother)
- Musical career
- Genres: Pop; dance; Latin pop; tropical music; regional Mexican; gospel
- Instrument: Vocals
- Labels: Discos GAMMA; EMI; CBS; PolyGram; WEA; Warner Music; Sony Music

Yuridia Valenzuela Canseco (born 6 January 1964), known mononymously as Yuri, is a Mexican singer, actress, and television presenter. She began her career as a teenager with the release of her debut album, Tú Iluminas mi Vida (1978), and gained wider recognition after representing Mexico at the OTI Festival in 1984, where she placed third with the song "Tiempos mejores". During the 1980s and early 1990s, she became one of the most popular pop singers in Latin America. Known for her vocal versatility, Yuri has explored genres including pop, dance, ranchera, and tropical music.

In the mid-1990s, Yuri paused her musical career to convert to Protestantism, and for a few years she devoted herself to Christian and gospel music. In 2002, she returned to secular music with commercial success. Since the mid-2000s, Yuri has established herself as one of Mexico's most successful singers.

She has released 29 studio albums and has sold more than 20 million copies worldwide, making her one of the best-selling Latin artists in history. Alongside her musical career, Yuri has also ventured into acting, appearing in several telenovelas and films, and has served as a television presenter on several television shows in Mexico. In 2018, she received the Latin Grammy Lifetime Achievement Award, becoming the youngest artist to win it, at 54 years old.

== Life and career ==
=== 1964–1977: Early life and family ===
Yuridia Valenzuela Canseco was born on 6 January 1964, in Veracruz, Mexico. She is the daughter of Dr. Carlos Humberto Valenzuela and Dulce Canseco. She had two siblings, Carlos (deceased) and Yamily.

During her childhood, alongside her regular schooling in Veracruz, Yuri studied classical dance. At the age of 11, she won a scholarship to the Bolshoi Ballet in Russia, but her parents did not allow her to take advantage of it. As a result, her mother encouraged her to pursue a career as a singer and created a musical concept called La Manzana Eléctrica.

Yuri took singing lessons in various venues, and the group debuted in 1976, performing at local events in Veracruz. Their repertoire included covers of artists such as Michael Jackson and Janis Joplin. Due to Yuri's growing popularity and charisma, the group was later renamed Yuri y La Manzana Eléctrica.

During this period, Yuri met Cuban singer Celia Cruz, as Yuri’s band often performed as a supporting act for Cruz’s shows in Veracruz. At one of their performances, Julio Jaramillo Arenas, an arranger and the director of A&R for the GAMMA record label, recognised Yuri's potential and offered her the opportunity to record her first album. Her mother accepted the proposal and became her manager. The family then moved to Mexico City, despite lacking financial support from relatives.

=== 1978–1979: Career beginnings and OTI ===
Under the production of Jaramillo (not to be confused with Ecuadorian singer Julio Jaramillo), Yuri recorded her debut album Tú iluminas mi vida, which included the Spanish adaptation of "You Light Up My Life," originally performed by American singer Debby Boone. The album produced her first national single but did not achieve commercial success.

In 1979, she made her acting debut in the film Milagro en el circo, starring Mexican comedian Cepillín, and appeared on the television program En familia con Chabelo on Televisa. That same year, she participated in the 8th Mexican national selection for the OTI Festival with the song "Siempre habrá un mañana". The entry didn't qualify for the national final and had allegations of plagiarism, as the composition bore similarities to "MacArthur Park" popularized by Donna Summer. Nevertheless, Yuri was unanimously awarded the "Breakout Artist Award", becoming the youngest performer to receive this recognition.

=== 1980–1989: Breakthrough, success and first marriage ===
In 1980, under the continued production of Julio Jaramillo Arenas, Yuri released her second studio album, Esperanzas, which marked her first major commercial success with the title track "Esperanzas". That same year, she made her television acting debut in the popular Televisa telenovela Colorina, starring Lucía Méndez, and later appeared in the telenovela Verónica alongside Christian Bach. The album was distributed in Central and South America, the Caribbean, and the United States. Singles such as "Primer amor", "Goma de mascar", and "Regresaré" reached top chart positions throughout Latin America.

In 1981, Yuri competed for the second time in the 10th Mexican national selection for the OTI Festival, placing third with "Deja", written by José María Napoleón, and receiving the Best Female Performer Award.

At the next year, she released her third studio album, Llena de dulzura, which achieved gold certification across Latin America. The album included hits such as "Mi timidez", "Llena de dulzura", "Tú y yo", "Este amor no se toca", and "Maldita primavera", a Spanish-language version of "Maledetta primavera" by Italian singer Loretta Goggi. Yuri also became the first Latin American female artist to receive a gold record in Spain. That same year, she recorded the single "El panda de Chapultepec", dedicated to Tohui the first panda bear born in captivity outside China. The single sold over one million copies and was later added to a reissue of Llena de dulzura. In 1983, Yuri released her fourth album, Sí, soy así, which featured the hit single "Yo te amo, te amo". She also starred in her second feature film, Secuestro en Acapulco, alongside the Venezuelan boy band Los Chamos.

In 1984, she released her fifth album, Karma Kamaleón, which included a Spanish version of Culture Club's hit "Karma Chameleon". That year, she entered for the third time in the 13th Mexican national selection for the OTI Festival with the song "Tiempos mejores", written by Sergio Andrade. The song won the national competition and she received the Best Female Performer Award, and went on to represent Mexico in the OTI Festival 1984, where they placed third. Later that year, Yuri was invited to the Viña del Mar International Song Festival in Chile, where she won the Silver Torch, becoming the first Mexican artist to receive this award.

In 1985, Yuri departed from GAMMA and got signed with EMI, released the album Yo te pido amor, which earned her a Grammy Award nomination. The singles "Yo te pido amor", "Déjala", and "Dame un beso" became radio hits across Latin America. That same year, she appeared in Playboy magazine in a photoshoot by Pompeo Posar. Although she did not pose nude, the issue achieved high sales.

In 1986, she released Un corazón herido, which featured the singles "Es ella más que yo", "Hoy me he vuelto a enamorar", and "Un corazón herido". The following year, she competed for the last time in the 16th Mexican national selection for the OTI Festival with "La locura de vivir" but received only one jury vote and did not qualify. The performance was considered a controversial moment of her career, being described as too bold for the festival.

In 1988, Yuri released Aire, one of her most successful albums. The singles "Cuando baja la marea", "Qué te pasa" and "Amores clandestinos" topped charts throughout Latin America. "Qué te pasa" set a record on Billboard Hot Latin Tracks as the longest-running number-one song of the 1980s, remaining at the top for 16 consecutive weeks and on the chart for a total of 33 weeks.

Following this success, executives Marcos Maynard and Manuel Calderón signed Yuri to CBS (now Sony Music). Her next album, Isla del Sol, incorporated a mix of dance, rap, pop, rock, and ballads, and produced hits such as the Hot Latin Tracks number-one single "Hombres al borde de un ataque de celos", "Imposible amarte como yo", "No puedo más", and "Hola". She also received a Lo Nuestro Award. Years later, Isla del Sol entered the Brazilian market. Around this time, she recorded a duet with actor Don Johnson, a Spanish version of "A Better Place". To capitalize on her popularity, her former label EMI released the compilation Algo de mi vida, which included previously unreleased material recorded earlier in her career.

In September 1989, Yuri released the album Sui Generis, which included the singles "Embrujada" and "Me tienes que querer".

=== 1990–1999: Divorce, new image, personal and professional setbacks ===
After divorcing her first husband, Yuri gave a turn to her career, and recorded under the direction of producer Mariano Pérez the album Soy Libre, same that three months after going on the market had sold more than half a million copies and which are the singles: "Quién eres Tu", "Todo mi corazón" and "El apagón".

For the second time, Yuri appears in Playboy and presented a show entitled Sin límites, which receives the recognition of the public and critics for its outstanding quality, which led the press and her fans to compare it with the singer Madonna: the nickname "the Mexican Madonna", which sparked such controversy that even important American programs, such as Hard Copy, took time to talk about this similarity. In 1991, Yuri resumed her role as an actress and filmed the movie Soy libre, directed by Juan Antonio de la Riva and where she alternates with Omar Fierro and Christian Bach.

In 1992, Yuri released her twelfth album, titled Obsesiones, which is again produced by Mariano Pérez. The album includes the song "Decir adiós", Spanish version of the song "As Time Goes By". The album also includes the song "Química perfecta", a duet with the Salsa singer Luis Enrique, as well as "Así es la vida" and "Poligamia".

In 1993, Yuri released the album Nueva era with the producer Alejandro Zepeda, which contains the songs "Detrás de Mi Ventana" (written by Ricardo Arjona), "Amiga mía" and "Si falta el amor". Also they sound in some countries the "Celia Mix" a medley of some hits of Celia Cruz.

In 1994, Yuri returned to television but now as host of the comic-musical show ¡No te muevas!. In that same year, she agreed to star in the Mexican telenovela Volver a empezar, starring alongside the Puerto Rican singer Chayanne for the Televisa network. In 1995, she performed again at Viña del Mar Festival. The pace of work devastated her health and a tumours were detected in her the vocal cords, which led her to fall into depression. In that year she released the album Espejos del Alma, which would obtain regular success on the radio due to the few presentations by Yuri for her health problems. Yuri was received in the Catholic Church in 1987 so that she could be married through the church with her first husband, Iriarte. In 1994, Yuri left the Catholic Church and caused a stir by embracing Protestantism and adhering to the Evangelical church. As an actress, she starred in the Christian film Altos instintos'. Yuri participated in the album Boleros por amor y desamor, under the label of Fonovisa and in which she interprets the theme "El espejo".

In 1996, Yuri recorded the Ranchera album Más Fuerte que la Vida, a disc that included some of her hits in the ranchera version and the Christian song that gave the album its name. During 1997 Yuri filmed the autobiographical film, Yuri, mi verdadera historia. In the film she reflects on her unhappiness despite her triumphs, fame and money. Also, she lets the audience see the frivolessneess of the stardom, causing controversy at the time of release. She witnessed to her conversion in countless forums and recorded the audio-cassette entitled Mi testimonio, which is distributed only in Protestant bookstores throughout Latin America, to share her approach to God.

Following this logic, the following year she was invited by Manolo Calderón to be part of the Polygram label and recorded the Gospel album Huellas. Yuri left behind her public image of sex symbol and wrote the song "María Magdalena". The single "Hoy que estamos juntos", a duet with her second husband Rodrigo, was quickly replaced in the top ten by the version of Jennifer Lopez and Marc Anthony with very different lyrics on the lack of love, as Yuri spoke of God in her version.

Yuri's successful record career began to decline and, due to these changes, and Yuri's indifference to continue in secular music, she would lose fans and contracts. She began to dedicate herself solely to her Christian audience, and she performed concerts with songs of praise and testimony of faith. When the single "Ven y tócame" was distributed, Yuri considered retiring from the stage.

=== 2000–2009: Pop return and resurgence ===
Yuri decides to return to secular music in mid-2001 convinced by her fans and makes some television appearances with new arrangements of her former successes. It was not until 2002 that Yuri returns formally with the release of her album Enamorada, where she leaves religious themes aside and takes up the themes of love. From this album there is a single success, the bachata "Ya no vives en mí". She also performs a special performance in the children's telenovela Vivan los niños.

In 2003, Yuri would sign again with Sony Music and record a ranchera music album, called Yuri/A lo Mexicano, at the request of the label, which includes duets with renowned artists such as Vicente Fernández, Ana Bárbara, Mijares and Pandora.

In 2004, and for three consecutive seasons, Yuri became the host of the reality show Objetivo Fama, recorded in Puerto Rico, and in 2006 a cover album was released with Mijares, entitled Acompáñame, whose first single "Callados", manages to be placed in the public's taste. The album obtained platinum disc, although in the radio it does not achieve the desired success. At the same time, she started the Cantar por cantar Tour, together with Mijares and Ricardo Montaner. In addition, she participated as part of the jury of the reality show Cantando por un sueño, from the Televisa network with Montaner, Adrián Posse and Susana Zabaleta for three seasons.

Yuri leaves Sony Music and in 2007 she presented a concert of successes at the Teatro de la Ciudad in Mexico City, which is recorded for a DVD and CD, published at the beginning of September of the same year with the title Vive la Historia, in which it includes the unreleased song "Y llegaste tú", of the album Acompáñame, which is quickly placed in the first places, and won recognition for its high sales.

In January 2008, Manolo Calderón invited her to be part of the Televisa EMI Music label. Televisa also invites her to animate the late night show Noche de estrellas, in which the duets in which Yuri participated with her guest artists were popularized, of which the ones she performed with Lupita D'Alessio, Enrique Iglesias and Juanes.

In December of the same year her new Latin pop album Mi Hijita Linda was released, where she recorded, at the request of the label, old-style cumbanchero themes that pretended to continue with the concept of "El Apagón", as well as including a duet with DJ Flex: "La mucura".

In 2009, Yuri is presented with great success in the Auditorio Nacional of Mexico City. She signed with Warner Music and on October 20 a CD-DVD of her concerts in the Auditorio Nacional, called El concierto, was released.

=== 2010–present: Projects and Sony music return ===
In 2010, under the production of Scott Erickson, Yuri releases the album Inusual, who got a gold record just two days after it was released. This record achieves success in countries like Chile and Mexico and from it comes the single "Arrepentida" and "Estoy Cansada", as well as some covers by Argentine singer Valeria Lynch. She also recorded the central theme of the Chilean TV series Infiltradas, entitled "Por el amor de un hombre", and was present at the Viña del Mar Festival in 2011 as a jury.

On September 27, 2011, she released the album, Mi tributo al Festival, where she pays homage to the late OTI Festival. In this album, Yuri interprets in a masterful way the winning songs of this festival. The first single is "Ay amor", by singer-songwriter Ana Gabriel. Yuri released the second part of this album in 2012 using the song "El triste", popularized by José José, as a single. In the same year she was the host of a late night show aired on Saturdays of every month, called Una noche con Yuri for Televisa.

In August 2014, Yuri announced her participation as coach of the fourth season of the Mexican version of The Voice alongside Ricky Martin, Laura Pausini and Julión Álvarez. In September of the same year, a second single titled "Duele" was released, playing alongside the Mexican band Reik. The same name album went on sale on April 14, 2015, in physical and digital record stores.

In 2016, Yuri signs a new contract with Sony Music and starts working on her new album Yuri en Primera Fila, a record recorded live with her hits and new songs. In February 2017, the first unpublished single of the disc is released, entitled "Perdón".

In 2017, Yuri became the host of the Mexican edition of The Voice Kids, and in the middle of the same year she repeated as coach in the sixth season of Mexican version of The Voice alongside Carlos Vives, Maluma and Laura Pausini . In 2018, she served as coach in The Voice Kids in Colombia.

In 2018, Yuri ventured into musical theatre for the first time with the musical Cats in its Mexican version playing the character Grizabella. In the same year, the Latin Academy of Recording Arts & Sciences awarded Yuri the Latin Grammy Award to musical excellence in a ceremony held in Las Vegas.

In 2019, Yuri joined forces with the Mexican group Pandora to perform a musical tour.

== Artistry ==
Yuri has cited artists such as Rocío Dúrcal, Madonna, Michael Jackson, Janet Jackson, Cher and Celia Cruz, among her musical influences. Her work has also been cited as an influence on artists in the Hispanic music market, including: Yuridia, María José, Alejandra Guzmán and Shakira. Yuri has been recognized for her contribution to the musical culture of Mexico and Latin America.

Several of her songs are part of the successful musical Mentiras, based on Latin musical successes of the 1980s, similarly there is a character named Yuri in her honor.

Yuri has one of the most prodigious voices in Latin music in history, and has a wide vocal record. She is known for being one of the few Latin singers of the 1980s who are still active in the market, due to her capacity for evolution and skills as an artist. Yuri is a professional dancer, so she easily includes dances and choreographies in her concerts, which include costume changes, visual screens, dancers and set design, elements that are rare in Latin artists and much less in her generation. She has been known for including the genre pop and ballad on her albums, but throughout her career she has included various rhythms, such as rock, bolero, salsa, Ranchero, gospel and many more.

== Personal life ==
In 1988, Yuri married the publicist Fernando Iriarte (son of Mexican journalist Maxine Woodside) in a Catholic ceremony. The marriage ended in divorce in 1990.

From 1995 to date, Yuri is married to Chilean singer and Evangelical Pastor, Rodrigo Espinoza. In 2009, she announced her motherhood with the adoption of a 7-month-old girl named Camila.

== Discography ==
- Tú Iluminas mi Vida (1978)
- Esperanzas (1980)
- Llena de dulzura (1981)
- Yuri: Sí, soy así (1983)
- Karma Kamaleón (1984)
- Yo te pido amor (1985)
- Un corazón herido (1986)
- Aire (1987)
- Isla del Sol (1988)
- Sui Generis (1989)
- Soy Libre (1991)
- Obsesiones (1992)
- Nueva era (1993)
- Espejos del Alma (1995)
- Más Fuerte que la Vida (1997)
- Huellas (1998)
- Que tu fe nunca muera (2000)
- Enamorada (2002)
- Yuri/A lo Mexicano (2004)
- Acompáñame (with Mijares) (2006)
- Mi Hijita Linda (2008)
- Inusual (2010)
- Mi Tributo al Festival (2011)
- Mi Tributo al Festival II (2013)
- Invencible (2015)
- Primera Fila: Yuri (2017)
- Celebrando a una Leyenda (2021)
- Yuri y sus Amigos del Regional Mexicano (2025)
- Señora (2026)

== Tours ==
- Invencible Tour : 2015-2016

== Filmography ==
=== Film ===
Year	Title	Role	Notes
1978	Milagro en el circo	Lily	Musical comedy film
1983	Secuestro en Acapulco-Canta Chamo	Rosita	Musical comedy film
1991	Soy libre	Mariana	Main role
1995	Altos instintos	Miriam	Main role; Christian film
1997	Yuri, mi verdadera historia	Herself	Christian biopic

=== Television ===
Year	Title	Role	Notes
1979–1995	Siempre en Domingo	Herself	Musical guest
1982	Colorina	Italia "Ita" Ferrari	Recurring role
1982	El Show de las Estrellas	Herself	Musical guest
1983	Verónica	Norma	Recurring role
1994	Volver a Empezar	Renata "Reny" Jiménez / Chaquira	Main role
2002	¡Vivan los niños!	Regina Noriega	Recurring role
2006	La fea más bella	Herself	1 episode
2023	Secretos de las indomables	Herself	Main cast

== Awards and recognitions ==
=== Grammy Awards ===
Year	Category	Nominated work	Result	Ref.
Grammy Awards
1987	Best Latin Pop Album	Yo Te Pido Amor	Nominated	
Latin Grammy Awards
2018	Lifetime Achievement Award	Herself	Honored	

=== Miscellaneous awards and honors ===
1979

Revelation Award Of The Mexican OTI 1979.

1980

Gold Record for selling 1,000,000 copies of her album Esperanzas

1981

Double platinum record and gold for selling almost 2,000,000 copies of her album Llena de Dulzura. This album obtains gold record in Spain, the first gold record awarded to a Latin American singer for the sales over 50,000 copies only in Spain. Llena de Dulzura also recognized gold record because of the highest sales in Colombia, Ecuador, Brasil, Chile, Perú and Panamá.
Award "Galardón a los Grandes'" from the TV show Siempre en Domingo.

1982

Named by the Mexican OTI as The Best Singer of the Year for the song "Deja"
Award Galardón a los Grandes from the TV show Siempre en Domingo.
Gold record in Spain (first Latin American woman to win a gold record)
4 platinum records and 1 gold record for her album Oso Panda de Chapultepec, 2,000,000 copies sold.

1983

Award in Spain as "International Revelation"
Award "'Galardón a los Grandes" from the TV show Siempre en Domingo.

1984

First place nationwide at the Mexican OTI for the song "Tiempos Mejores" and awarded best Interpreter, and third place with the same song at the international OTI festival.
The "Antorcha de Plata" at the Viña del Mar Festival: Best Female Performance
Award "Galardón a los Grandes'" from the TV show Siempre en Domingo.
Karma Kamaleón obtains platinum and gold records for selling 700,000 copies.

1985

Gold and platinum record for selling over 600,000 copies of Yo de pido amor

1986

Platinum record for selling 250,000 copies of Un corazón Herido
Award Galardón a los Grandes from the TV show Siempre en Domingo.

1987

Her native Veracruz held a tribute in her honor.
Her album Aire obtained platinum certification for selling over 700,000 copies.

1988

Award Lo Nuestro from the Latin US TV network Univisión for her album Aire
Platinum record for selling over 350,000 copies of Isla del Sol
Award "Galardón a los Grandes" from the TV show Siempre en Domingo.
EMI released a compilation album named 15 éxitos de Oro (15 Gold Hits) that she had when working for EMI Capitol. This received platinum and gold records for selling over 350,000 copies, one of her most successful compilation albums.

1989

TVyNovelas Award as "Singer With Most International Projection"
Award "Galardón a los Grandes" from the TV show Siempre en Domingo.

1990

ACE Award to the most outstanding singer of the year.
ERES award for Best Performance.
Gold and platinum records for sales of 350,000 copies of her album Suigeneris
Award "Galardón a los Grandes" from TV show Siempre en Domingo.
Confesiones de Amor, another compilation album released by EMI reaches 100,000 sold copies.
ERES magazine chose the album Suigeneris as one of the ten most important albums in Spanish of 1990.

1991

Gold and platinum records for selling 300,000 copies of her album Soy Libre
Two "Gaviotas de Plata" (Silver Seagulls) at the Viña del Mar Festival.
Títle of "Miss Simpatía" (Miss Congeniality) and the "Artista más popular" (Most Popular Artist) at the Viña del Mar Festival.
Queen Of The Viña del Mar Festival.
Special recognition from TVyNovelas as "Best International Singer"
ERES award for Best Performance.
Award "Galardón a los Grandes" from TV show Siempre en Domingo.

1992

"Aplauso" Award as Best Female.
Queen Of The Veracruz Canival.
ERES Award for Best Performance.
TvyNovelas Award For "Proyección en el extranjero" (International projection)
Award "Galardón a los Grandes" from TV show Siempre en Domingo for the song "El Apagón"
Platinum record for over 260,000 sales of her album Obsesiones
ERES magazine chose the album Obsesiones as one of the 10 most important albums in Spanish of 1992.

1993

ERES Award as Best Female Singer.
ERES Award for Best performance.
Double gold record for selling over 250,000 copies in México of her album Nueva Era
Gold record In United States for selling over 200,000 copies.
Award "Galardón a los Grandes" from TV show Siempre en Domingo.
ERES magazine chose the Album Nueva Era as one of the 10 most important albums in Spanish of 1993.

1994

ERES Award for Best Soap Opera Song "Volver a empezar"
ERES Award For Best Female performance.
TvyNovelas Award for the highest rating in a TV soap opera in the United States with Volver a empezar
Gold record for selling 100,000 copies of the album Reencuentros.

1995

ERES Award For Best Female performance.
Gold record for her album Espejos del Alma.

1997

Homage for her 25 years of artistic career on the TV show Siempre en Domingo.
Award "Galardón a los Grandes" from the TV show Siempre en Domingo.

1998

Gold record for her album Huellas for selling over 150,000 copies.
Gold record in Puerto Rico ofor her album Huellas for selling 50,000 copies.

2006

Platinum record for 100,000 sales of her album Acompañame in duet with Mijares.

2007

Oye Award for 30 years of artistic career.
Homage in Premios oye for her long and successful career.

2008

Wax statue in the Veracruz Museum recognizing her important legacy as a Veracruzan in music.
Gold and platinum records for her live album Yuri, Vive La Historia for selling over 100,000 copies.

== See also ==
- List of best-selling Latin music artists
- Women in Latin music
