= Vive la Historia =

Live album by Yuri
- Released: September 12, 2007 (Mexico)
- Recorded: February 14, 2007
- Genres: Pop; Ballad
- Label: EMI
- Director: Rodrigo Espinoza

Yuri chronology
Acompáñame (2006)	Vive la Historia (2007)	Mi Hijita Linda (2008)

Vive la Historia (English: Live the Story) is a live album by Mexican pop singer Yuri. It was released in 2007. It sold more than 100,000 earning Gold and Platinum disc.

== Reception ==
In 2007, Yuri released "Vive la Historia" that consisted of her first live package of DVD and CD of her greatest hits, reaching Gold disc regardless of not being promoted and no single releases. Shortly thereafter, a "Fan Edition" was released. This helped the album reach platinum.

== Track listing ==
Tracks:

1. Intro Hola
2. Hola
3. Todo mi corazón
4. Hombres al borde de un ataque de celos
5. Detrás de mi ventana
6. ¿Qué Te Pasa?
7. Medley baladas 1
8. Cuando baja la marea
9. Intro Maldita Primavera
10. Maldita Primavera
11. Medley Baladas 2
12. Intro El Apagón
13. El Apagón
14. Medley 80's

=== De Luxe Edition ===
Tracks:

==== CD 1 ====
1. Intro Hola
2. Hola
3. Todo mi corazón
4. Hombres al borde de un ataque de celos
5. Amiga mía
6. Detrás de mi ventana
7. ¿Qué Te Pasa?
8. Medley baladas 1
9. Intro Sabes lo que pasa
10. Sabes lo que pasa
11. Y llegaste tú
12. Cuando baja la marea

==== CD 2 ====
1. De qué te vale fingir
2. Intro Maldita Primavera
3. Maldita Primavera
4. Medley Baladas 2
5. El Espejo
6. Intro El Apagón
7. El Apagón
8. Medley 80's

==== DVD ====
1. Menu Loop 'Vive La Historia'
2. Intro Hola
3. Hola
4. Todo mi Corazón
5. Hombres al Borde de un Ataque de Celos
6. Amiga Mia
7. Detrás De Mi Ventana
8. ¿Qué Te Pasa?
9. Medley Baladas 1
10. Intro Sabes Lo Que Pasa
11. Sabes Lo Que Pasa
12. Y Llegaste Tú
13. Cuando Baja La Marea
14. De Que Te Vale Fingir
15. Intro Maldita Primavera
16. Maldita Primavera
17. Medley Baladas 2
18. El Espejo
19. Intro El Apagón
20. El Apagón
21. Medley 80's
22. Detrás Del Maquillaje
23. Photogallery 'Vive La Historia'
