= Gian Pietro Felisatti =

Italian music producer and songwriter (1950–2022)

Gian Pietro Felisatti (1950 – 18 June 2022), also known only as DiFelisatti, was an Italian music producer and songwriter.

== Career ==
Born in Vigevano, Felisatti started his career in the 1960s as the singer and frontman of the band Funamboli. In the second half of the 1970s he focused on composition, and hits penned by him include Mina's "Ancora, ancora, ancora", Loredana Bertè's "Sei bellissima", Andrea Bocelli's "Il mare calmo della sera", and Miguel Bosé's "Super Superman". In the 1980s he produced several albums for Manuel Mijares, Rocío Banquells, Paloma San Basilio, Yuri, Pandora, Lucero, Daniela Romo, Alejandra Guzmán, Antonio De Carlo, Timbiriche, Patricia Manterola, Fey, Kairo, Miguel Bosé, Miguel Gallardo, Bertín Osborne, and Lucía Méndez.
