= Mexico in the OTI Festival 1990 =

- OTI Festival 1990
- Participating broadcaster: Televisa
- Country: Mexico
- Selection process: National OTI Festival
- Selection date: 3 November 1990

Competing entry
- Song: "Un bolero"
- Artist: Carlos Cuevas
- Songwriters: Francisco Curiel; Pedro Alberto Cárdenas

Placement
- Final result: 1st

Participation chronology
◄1989 •	1990	• 1991►

Mexico was represented at the OTI Festival 1990 with the song "Un bolero", written by Francisco Curiel and Pedro Alberto Cárdenas, and performed by Carlos Cuevas. The Mexican participating broadcaster, Televisa, selected its entry through a national televised competition with several phases. The song, that was performed in position 18, placed first out of 21 competing entries, winning the festival. This was the fifth entry from Mexico that won the OTI Festival, after winning in 1973, in 1975, in 1985, and in 1989.

== National stage ==
Televisa held a national competition with two televised qualifying rounds and a final to select its entry for the 19th edition of the OTI Festival. This nineteenth edition of the National OTI Festival featured eighteen songs in the qualifying rounds and ten in the final. The top-three entries were awarded. In addition to the general competition, awards were also given for Best Male Performer, Best Female Performer, and Best Musical Arrangement.

The shows were held at Teatro de la Ciudad in Mexico City, with Yolanda de la Cruz presenting the second qualifying round and Raúl Velasco the final, and were broadcast on Canal 2. The musical director was Chucho Ferrrer, who conducted the orchestra when required.

Competing entries on the National OTI Festival – Mexico 1990
Song	Artist	Songwriter(s)	Conductor
"16 diciembres"	Cristian Castro	Sergio Esquivel	Pedro Alberto Cárdenas
"Adelante y buena suerte"	José Cantoral	José Cantoral	
"Enhorabuena"	Sergio Esquivel	Sergio Esquivel	
"Enséñame a vivir sin ti"	Francisco Xavier	Francisco Xavier	
"Guitarra por un día"	Flor Yvone Quezada		
"Hacerte amor"	Magdalena Zárate	José Manuel Fernández	Eduardo Magallanes
"Mujeres"	Carlos Lara	Carlos Lara	
"Nacerá"	Aída Cuevas	Juan Francisco Rodríguez; Marco Antonio González	Pedro Alberto Cárdenas
"No te cambio"	Alejandro Filio	Alejandro Filio	Jesús Medel
"Olvídalo"	Antonio de Jesús		
"Por cantar"	Pedro Fernández	Miguel Alfonso Luna; José María Frías	Jesús Medel
"Porque tú no estás"	Crystal		
"Puede ser"	José María Napoleón	José María Napoleón	
"Sálvalo"	Mario Pintor		
"Sofía está bien"	Gil Rivera		
"Tócame"	Óscar Athié		
"Un bolero"	Carlos Cuevas	Francisco Curiel; Pedro Alberto Cárdenas	Pedro Alberto Cárdenas
"Viernes primero"	Alejandra Ávalos	Pedro Alberto Cárdenas	Pedro Alberto Cárdenas

=== Qualifying rounds ===
The two qualifying rounds were held on Saturdays 20 and 27 October 1990. Each round featured nine entries, of which the five highest-scoring advanced to the final.

Qualifier

Result of the first qualifying round of the National OTI Festival – Mexico 1990
R/O	Song	Artist	Result
1	"No te cambio"	Alejandro Filio	Qualified
2	"Guitarra por un día"	Flor Yvone Quezada	—N/a
3	"Adelante y buena suerte"	José Cantoral	Qualified
4	"16 diciembres"	Cristian Castro	—N/a
5	"Nacerá"	Aída Cuevas	—N/a
6	"Porque tú no estás"	Crystal	—N/a
7	"Por cantar"	Pedro Fernández	Qualified
8	"Puede ser"	José María Napoleón	Qualified
9	"Enséñame a vivir sin ti"	Francisco Xavier	Qualified

Result of the second qualifying round of the National OTI Festival – Mexico 1990
R/O	Song	Artist	Result
1	"Sálvalo"	Mario Pintor	—N/a
2	"Sofía está bien"	Gil Rivera	—N/a
3	"Un bolero"	Carlos Cuevas	Qualified
4	"Olvídalo"	Antonio de Jesús	—N/a
5	"Hacerte amor"	Magdalena Zárate	Qualified
6	"Mujeres"	Carlos Lara	Qualified
7	"Enhorabuena"	Sergio Esquivel	Qualified
8	"Tócame"	Óscar Athié	—N/a
9	"Viernes primero"	Alejandra Ávalos	Qualified

=== Final ===
The ten-song final was held on Saturday 3 November 1990.

Winner

Result of the final of the National OTI Festival – Mexico 1990
R/O	Song	Artist	Votes	Result
1	"Enhorabuena"	Sergio Esquivel		
2	"Hacerte amor"	Magdalena Zárate		
3	"Mujeres"	Carlos Lara		
4	"Por cantar"	Pedro Fernández		
5	"Viernes primero"	Alejandra Ávalos		
6	"Adelante y buena suerte"	José Cantoral	4	3
7	"Enséñame a vivir sin ti"	Francisco Xavier		
8	"Puede ser"	José María Napoleón		
9	"Un bolero"	Carlos Cuevas	9	1
10	"No te cambio"	Alejandro Filio	8	2

=== Merit awards ===
In the final, the jurors voted for the Best Male and Female Performer, and Best Best Musical Arrangement among the shortlisted artist in each category. Carlos Cuevas received the Best Male Performer Award; Aída Cuevas the Best Female Performer Award; and Pedro Alberto Cárdenas the Best Musical Arrangement Award for "Viernes primero".

== At the OTI Festival ==
On 1 December 1990, the OTI Festival was held at the Circus Maximus of the Caesars Palace in Las Vegas, United States, hosted by Univision, and broadcast live throughout Ibero-America. Carlos Cuevas performed "Un bolero" in position 18, with Pedro Alberto Cárdenas conducting the event's orchestra, placing first out of 21 competing entries, winning the festival. This was the fifth entry from Mexico that won the OTI Festival, after winning in 1973, in 1975, in 1985, and in 1989.
