= Ay Amor (Ana Gabriel song) =

"¡Ay, amor!"

Single by Ana Gabriel

from the album Pecado Original
- Language: Spanish
- Released: 1987
- Recorded: 1987
- Genre: Latin pop
- Length: 3:22
- Label: Discos CBS International
- Songwriter: Ana Gabriel
- Producer: Mariano Pérez Bautista

Ana Gabriel singles chronology
"Mar y Arena" (1987)	"¡Ay, amor!" (1987)	"Pecado Original" (1988)

OTI Festival 1987 entry
- Country: Mexico
- Language: Spanish
- Conductor: Chucho Ferrer

Finals performance
- Final result: 3rd

Entry chronology
- ◄ "De color de rosa" (1986)
- "Contigo y con el mundo" (1988) ►

"¡Ay, amor!" (English: Oh Love) is a ballad written and performed by Mexican singer-songwriter Ana Gabriel and produced by Mariano Pérez Bautista. It was released as the first single from her third studio album, Pecado Original (1987). It won the 16th Mexican national selection for the OTI Festival, and thus represented Mexico at the OTI Festival 1987, where it placed third. This song became the second to spend 14 consecutive weeks at number one in the Billboard Hot Latin Tracks chart, after "De mí enamórate" by fellow Mexican singer Daniela Romo, being surpassed in the same year by "Qué te pasa" by Yuri when it achieved sixteen weeks at the top of the chart.

"¡Ay, amor!" is also recognized as one of Gabriel's signature songs and has been performed by several singers, including Tino y su Banda Joven, Jannette Chao, Keyla Caballero, Myriam and Yuri.

== Background ==
Mexican singer-songwriter Ana Gabriel, after ten years of preparation, received in 1984 the opportunity to participate on the Mexican Festival 'Valores Juveniles', in which she participated as a composer with the song "No me lástimes más", and won second place in the contest. Following this victory she was called by CBS and was offered an exclusive contract. In 1985, she participated in the 14th Mexican national selection for the OTI Festival with the song "Búscame", which wrote with Tony Flores. That same year she recorded his first album, entitled Un estilo. In 1986, she participated again in the 15th national selection with the song "A tu lado". Finally, in 1987, she won the 16th national selection with the song "¡Ay, amor!", where she also received the Best Female Performer Award, and thus represented Mexico at the OTI Festival 1987, where it ranked third, in a tie with the song "Bravo samurái" by Vicky Larraz which represented Spain.

"¡Ay, amor!" was produced by Mariano Pérez Bautista and was released as the first single from Gabriel's third studio album Pecado Original (1987). This song was a success in Mexico and United States, leading the album to its peak at number three in the Billboard Latin Pop Albums and approximate sales of two and a half million units in Latin America.

== Chart performance ==
The song debuted on the Billboard Hot Latin Tracks chart at number 35 on 21 November 1987 and climbed to the top ten four weeks later. It reached the top position of the chart on 23 January 1988, replacing "Soy así" by Mexican singer José José and being replaced twelve weeks later by Juan Gabriel's "Debo hacerlo". "¡Ay, amor!" returned to number-one for two additional weeks, replacing "Y ahora te vas" by Los Bukis and being replaced by "Qué te pasa" by Yuri. Only four female singers have achieved the same number of weeks (or more) at number one on the Hot Latin Tracks history: Daniela Romo (14 weeks with "De mí enamórate" in 1986–1987), Yuri (16 weeks with "Qué te pasa" in 1988) and Shakira (25 weeks with "La Tortura" in 2005).

== Charts ==
=== Weekly charts ===
Chart (1988)	Peak position
Bolivia (UPI)	1
Colombia (UPI)	4
Mexico (AMPROFON)	1
US Hot Latin Songs (Billboard)	1

=== Year-end charts ===
Chart (1988)	Position
US Hot Latin Tracks (Billboard)	1

=== All-time charts ===
Chart (2021)	Position
US Hot Latin Songs (Billboard)	14

== Credits and personnel ==
This information adopted from Allmusic.

- Mariano Pérez Bautista – director, producer, mixing
- Carlos Gómez – piano, arranger, keyboards, engineer
- Javier Losada – piano, arranger, keyboards, engineer
- Henry Díaz – percussion
- Ana Gabriel – lead vocals, lyrics
- Rodrigo García – acoustic guitar
- Eduardo Gracía – bass
- Antonio Moreno – drums
- Tito Saavedra – engineer, mixing
- Antonio Sauco – arranger
- Maisa Hens – vocals
- María Lar – vocals
- José Flacón – vocals
