= Pecado Original (album) =

Pecado original

Studio album by Ana Gabriel
- Released: 8 December 1987
- Recorded: 1987
- Studio: Circus (Madrid)
- Genre: Pop
- Label: CBS
- Producer: Mariano Perez Bautista

Ana Gabriel chronology
Sagitario (1986)	Pecado original (1987)	Tierra de nadie (1988)

Singles from Pecado original
- 1. "¡Ay, amor!" Released: 12 October 1987; 2. "Pecado original" Released: 15 February 1988

Pecado original (English: Original Sin) is the third studio album by Mexican singer Ana Gabriel. It was released by CBS Records on 8 December 1987. The album was produced by Mariano Perez Bautista.

The album marked the beginning of her international stardom. Its first single, "¡Ay, amor!", was first performed at the 16th Mexican national selection for the OTI Festival, which won, and thus represented Mexico at the OTI Festival 1987, where it placed third. The song became her first number-one song on the US Billboard Hot Latin Tracks chart.

== Singles ==
"¡Ay, amor!" was released as the album's lead single. It became a huge success, being Gabriel's first number-one song on the US Billboard Hot Latin Songs, topping the chart for fourteen weeks, and eventually ending as the best-performing Latin single of 1988. Internationally, "¡Ay, amor!" also reached number one in Bolivia and her native Mexico; while it peaked at number four in Colombia. The title track was released as the second single from the album. It reached number 14 on the US Billboard Hot Latin Songs, and hit the top-ten in her native Mexico.

=== Other songs ===
Another track, "Amor", though it wasn't released as a single, was an unexpected success in Paraguay, where it reached number one.

== Track listing ==
Tracks:

1. "Pecado original" 03:29 (Original by Roupa Nova)
2. "Ven, ven" 03:58 (Original by Marisol)
3. "Ven cariño" 03:31
4. "Por culpa del amor" 03:58
5. "Amor con desamor" 03:38
6. "Amor" 04:42
7. "Cruz y raya" 03:34
8. "¡Ay, amor!" 03:23
9. "Noche a noche" 03:35
10. "Pensar en ti" 03:49

== Album chart ==
Pecado original reached number three on the Billboard Latin Pop Albums chart.

== Certifications ==
Region	Certification	Certified units/sales
Mexico (AMPROFON)	Platinum	250,000^{‡}
^{‡} Sales+streaming figures based on certification alone.
