= Tiempos Mejores =

"Tiempos mejores"

Single by Yuri
- Language: Spanish
- Released: 1984
- Recorded: 1984
- Genre: Pop
- Songwriter: Sergio Andrade

Music video
- "Tiempos Mejores" on YouTube

OTI Festival 1984 entry
- Country: Mexico
- Language: Spanish
- Conductor: Sergio Andrade

Finals performance
- Final result: 3rd

Entry chronology
- ◄ "Compás de espera" (1983)
- "El fandango aquí" (1985) ►

"Tiempos mejores" (Better times) is a 45" single by Mexican pop singer Yuri. The song was written by Sergio Andrade and it was released in 1984. It won the 13th Mexican national selection for the OTI Festival, and represented Mexico in the OTI Festival 1984 earning 3rd place.

The song was originally written for Crystal, a blind singer who collaborated with Andrade. Its lyrics tell the story of a blind woman listening to the news on television expecting better times. Crystal attended a concert by Juan Gabriel, during which he sang a song for her. According to her, Andrade was upset and believed she was seeking to make Juan Gabriel to become her new producer. Andrade decided to give the song to Yuri instead.

"Tiempos Mejores" was not included in any studio album.

== Track listing ==
No.	Title	Writer(s)	Producer(s)	Length
1.	"Tiempos mejores"	Sergio Andrade	Andrade	3:20
2.	"Tiempos mejores (Instrumental)"	Andrade	Andrade	3:20
