= Mexico in the OTI Festival 1987 =

- OTI Festival 1987
- Participating broadcaster: Televisa
- Country: Mexico
- Selection process: National OTI Festival
- Selection date: 4 October 1987

Competing entry
- Song: "¡Ay, amor!"
- Artist: Ana Gabriel
- Songwriter: Ana Gabriel

Placement
- Final result: 3rd

Participation chronology
◄1986 •	1987	• 1988►

Mexico was represented at the OTI Festival 1987 with the song "¡Ay, amor!", written and performed by Ana Gabriel. The Mexican participating broadcaster, Televisa, selected its entry through a national televised competition with several phases. The song, that was performed in position 19, placed third out of 24 competing entries, tying with the song from Spain.

== National stage ==
Televisa held a national competition with three televised qualifying rounds, a playoff, a semi-final, and a final to select its entry for the 16th edition of the OTI Festival. This sixteenth edition of the National OTI Festival featured twenty-four songs in the qualifying rounds, twelve in the semi-final, and six in the final. The top-three entries were awarded at the end. In addition to the general competition, awards were also given for Best Male Performer, Best Female Performer, Best Musical Arrangement, Breakout Male Artist, Breakout Female Artist, and Best Group among all the competing artists.

The qualifying rounds were held at Studio 2 of Televisa San Ángel in Mexico City, presented by Gloria Calzada, while the semi-final and the final were held in Querétaro, presented by Raúl Velasco, all broadcast on Canal 2. The musical director was Chucho Ferrrer, who conducted the orchestra when required.

Competing entries on the National OTI Festival – Mexico 1987
Song	Artist	Songwriter(s)	Conductor
"1977"	Lara y Monárrez	Carlos Lara; Jesús Monárrez	Jesús Medel
"América"	Johnny Laboriel	Jorge Gómez; Saúl de León	Saúl de León
"Atrápalo"	Byanca		
"¡Ay, amor!"	Ana Gabriel	Ana Gabriel	Rubén Zepeda
"¡Basta ya!"	Claudia Angélica	Francisco Curiel; Juan Francisco Rodríguez	Francisco Curiel
"Contra corriente"	Álvaro Dávila	Álvaro Dávila	Guillermo Méndez Guiú
"Corazón digital"	Okey	Erick Aldrett	
"Déjenos vivir"	Francisco Xavier	Francisco Xavier Berganza	Marco Flores
"Estoy loco"	Marcos Valdés	Jorge T. Victoria	Jesús López
"Fuego en la sangre"	Marycela	Alfredo Díaz Ordaz	Alfredo Díaz Ordaz
"Hazlo todo tú"	Hernán Visetti	Sylvia Tapia	Rubén Zepeda
"La locura de vivir"	Yuri	Roberto Roffiel	Roberto Roffiel
"La musa"	José Cantoral	José Cantoral	
"Los amantes"	Pandora	Gloria Campos; Fernando Riba	Chucho Ferrer
"Nany, nany"	Jay-Boss	Francisco Curiel; Galo de Icaza	Chucho Ferrer
"Ni una gota de amor"	Marisa de Lille	Francisco Samper	Jesús Medel
"No pierdas el tiempo"	Laura Flores	Laura Flores; Alejandro Zepeda	Rubén Zepeda
"Por ti"	Marián	Carlos María	Pedro Alberto Cárdenas
"Sigue la vida"	Gibrán	Alejandro Filio	Chucho Ferrer
"Sin libertad"	Dulce	Fernando Riba	Alfonso Rosas
"Te declaro mi amor"	Lolita Cortés	Antonio de Jesús	Jesús Medel
"Tu saborcito"	La Pirámide	Óscar Balmori; Jorge García Castil	Carlos Guerrero
"Un ser humano"	José María Lobo	José María Lobo	Francisco Curiel
"Yo no sé"	Jorge Muñiz	Grupo Forastero	Eugenio Toussaint

=== Qualifying rounds ===
The three qualifying rounds were held on Saturdays 5, 12, and 19 September 1987. Each round featured eight entries, of which the three highest-scoring advanced to the semi-final. In each round, after all the competing entries were performed, each of the nine jurors cast one vote for each of their three favorite entries. In case of a tie for qualification, the president of the jury decided between the tied entries.

The nine jurors in the qualifiying rounds were: Shanik Berman, Alma Elena Quintana, Jesús Gallegos, Enrique Okamura, Tomás Méndez, Moisés Ortega Medina, Marcos Olivares, Andrea Cotto, and Juan Calderón as chairperson.

Qualifier

Result of the first qualifying round of the National OTI Festival – Mexico 1987
R/O	Song	Artist	Votes	Result
1	"Tu saborcito"	La Pirámide	4	—N/a
2	"Te declaro mi amor"	Lolita Cortés	0	—N/a
3	"América"	Johnny Laboriel	2	—N/a
4	"Ni una gota de amor"	Marisa de Lille	0	—N/a
5	"1977"	Lara y Monárrez	4	Qualified
6	"¡Ay, amor!"	Ana Gabriel	9	Qualified
7	"Hazlo todo tú"	Hernán Visetti	7	Qualified
8	"La locura de vivir"	Yuri	1	—N/a

Detailed vote of the first qualifying round of the National OTI Festival – Mexico 1987
R/O	Song	Shanik Berman	Alma Elena Quintana	Jesús Gallegos	Enrique Okamura	Juan Calderón	Tomás Méndez	Moisés Ortega Medina	Marcos Olivares	Andrea Cotto	Total
1	"Tu saborcito"	1					1	1		1	4
2	"Te declaro mi amor"										0
3	"América"				1				1		2
4	"Ni una gota de amor"										0
5	"1977"			1		1	1	1			4
6	"¡Ay, amor!"	1	1	1	1	1	1	1	1	1	9
7	"Hazlo todo tú"	1	1	1	1	1			1	1	7
8	"La locura de vivir"		1								1

Result of the second qualifying round of the National OTI Festival – Mexico 1987
R/O	Song	Artist	Votes	Result
1	"Por ti"	Marián	0	—N/a
2	"Contra corriente"	Álvaro Dávila	6	Qualified
3	"¡Basta ya!"	Claudia Angélica	2	—N/a
4	"Los amantes"	Pandora	6	Qualified
5	"La musa"	José Cantoral	8	Qualified
6	"Fuego en la sangre"	Marycela	0	—N/a
7	"Corazón digital"	Okey	0	—N/a
8	"Déjenos vivir"	Francisco Xavier	5	—N/a

Result of the third qualifying round of the National OTI Festival – Mexico 1987
R/O	Song	Artist	Votes	Result
1	"Atrápalo"	Byanca	1	—N/a
2	"Sigue la vida"	Gibrán	6	—N/a
3	"No pierdas el tiempo"	Laura Flores	1	—N/a
4	"Nany, nany"	Jay-Boss	0	—N/a
5	"Yo no sé"	Jorge Muñiz	6	Qualified
6	"Estoy loco"	Marcos Valdés	0	—N/a
7	"Un ser humano"	José María Lobo	7	Qualified
8	"Sin libertad"	Dulce	6	Qualified

=== Playoff ===
The playoff was held on Saturday 19 September 1987 following the third qualifying round. To select the last three semi-finalists, each of the nine jurors cast one vote for each of their three favorite entries among the fifteen not qualified.

Result of the playoff of the National OTI Festival – Mexico 1987
Song	Result
"América"	—N/a
"Atrápalo"	—N/a
"¡Basta ya!"	—N/a
"Déjenos vivir"	Qualified
"Corazón digital"	—N/a
"Estoy loco"	—N/a
"Fuego en la sangre"	—N/a
"La locura de vivir"	—N/a
"Nany, nany"	—N/a
"Ni una gota de amor"	—N/a
"No pierdas el tiempo"	—N/a
"Por ti"	—N/a
"Sigue la vida"	Qualified
"Te declaro mi amor"	—N/a
"Tu saborcito"	Qualified

=== Semi-final ===
The semi-final was held on Saturday 3 October 1987. After all the competing entries were performed, each of the eleven jurors cast one vote for each of their six favorite entries, and the six most voted songs went on to the final.

Result of the semi-final of the National OTI Festival – Mexico 1987
R/O	Song	Artist	Votes	Result
1	"Tu saborcito"	La Pirámide	1	—N/a
2	"Sigue la vida"	Gibrán	8	Qualified
3	"Un ser humano"	José María Lobo	9	Qualified
4	"Contra corriente"	Álvaro Dávila	6	—N/a
5	"La musa"	José Cantoral	9	Qualified
6	"¡Ay, amor!"	Ana Gabriel	9	Qualified
7	"Los amantes"	Pandora	3	—N/a
8	"Déjenos vivir"	Francisco Xavier	2	—N/a
9	"Hazlo todo tú"	Hernán Visetti	5	—N/a
10	"Sin libertad"	Dulce	7	Qualified
11	"1977"	Lara y Monárrez	1	—N/a
12	"Yo no sé"	Jorge Muñiz	6	Qualified

=== Final ===
The six-song final was held on Sunday 4 October 1987. The final was held in two rounds. In the first round, each of the eleven jurors cast aloud one vote for each of their three favorite entries, and the three most voted songs went on to the superfinal. In the superfinal, after the three songs were performed again, each juror announced aloud one vote for their favourite entry. The eleven jurors were: Silvia Pinal, Enrique Okamura, Rocío Banquells, Alma Elena Quintana, Tomás Méndez, Juan Calderón (chairperson), Shanik Berman, Moisés Ortega Medina, Marcos Olivares, Andrea Cotto, and Jesús Gallegos.

The winner was "¡Ay, amor!", written and performed by Ana Gabriel. The festival ended with a reprise of the winning entry.

Result of the final of the National OTI Festival – Mexico 1987
R/O	Song	Artist	Votes	Result
1	"Yo no sé"	Jorge Muñiz	1	6
2	"La musa"	José Cantoral	8	Qualified
3	"Sin libertad"	Dulce	4	4
4	"Un ser humano"	José María Lobo	3	5
5	"Sigue la vida"	Gibrán	10	Qualified
6	"¡Ay, amor!"	Ana Gabriel	7	Qualified

Detailed vote of the final of the National OTI Festival – Mexico 1987
R/O	Song	Silvia Pinal	Enrique Okamura	Rocío Banquells	Alma Elena Quintana	Tomás Méndez	Juan Calderón	Shanik Berman	Moisés Ortega Medina	Marcos Olivares	Andrea Coto	Jesús Gallegos	Total
1	"Yo no sé"					1							1
2	"La musa"			1	1	1	1		1	1	1	1	8
3	"Sin libertad"	1		1					1	1			4
4	"Un ser humano"		1		1			1					3
5	"Sigue la vida"	1	1		1	1	1	1	1	1	1	1	10
6	"¡Ay, amor!"	1	1	1			1	1			1	1	7

Winner

Result of the superfinal of the National OTI Festival – Mexico 1987
R/O	Song	Artist	Votes	Result
1	"La musa"	José Cantoral	4	2
2	"Sigue la vida"	Gibrán	1	3
3	"¡Ay, amor!"	Ana Gabriel	6	1

Detailed vote of the superfinal of the National OTI Festival – Mexico 1987
R/O	Song	Silvia Pinal	Enrique Okamura	Rocío Banquells	Alma Elena Quintana	Tomás Méndez	Juan Calderón	Shanik Berman	Moisés Ortega Medina	Marcos Olivares	Andrea Coto	Jesús Gallegos	Total
1	"La musa"				1	1			1	1			4
2	"Sigue la vida"										1		1
3	"¡Ay, amor!"	1	1	1			1	1				1	6

=== Merit awards ===
In the final, the jurors voted for the Best Male and Female Performer, Best Musical Arrangement, Breakout Male and Female Artist, and Best Group among the three shortlisted artist in each category.

Álvaro Dávila received the Best Male Performer Award; Ana Gabriel the Best Female Performer Award; Guillermo Méndez Guiú the Best Musical Arrangement Award for "Contra corriente"; José María Lobo the Breakout Male Artist Award; Lolita Cortés the Breakout Female Artist Award, and Pandora the Best Group Award.

=== Official album ===
12 finalistas del Festival OTI 1987 is the official compilation album of the sixteenth edition of the Mexican National OTI Festival, released by Melody Internacional in 1987. The vinyl LP features the studio version of the twelve songs qualified for the semi-final.

== At the OTI Festival ==
On 24 October 1987, the OTI Festival was held at Teatro São Luiz in Lisbon, Portugal, hosted by Radiotelevisão Portuguesa (RTP), and broadcast live throughout Ibero-America. Ana Gabriel performed "¡Ay, amor!" in position 19, with Chucho Ferrer conducting the event's orchestra, and placing third out of 24 competing entries, tying with the song from Spain.
