= María del Sol =

Mexican singer (born 1961)

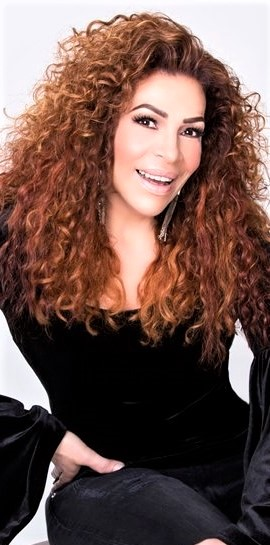
- Born: Marisol de las Mercedes Echánove Rojas; 24 September 1961 (age 64); Guanajuato, Mexico
- Occupation: Singer

Marisol de las Mercedes Echánove Rojas (born 24 September 1961), better known as María del Sol (Spanish pronunciation: [maˈɾi.a ðel ˈsol]), is a Mexican singer. She is the daughter of lawyer Alonso Echánove and the actress/journalist Josefina Echánove and the younger sister of Peggy Echánove and actor Alonso Echánove.

In the 1970s, she auditioned with music producer Luis de Llano and got married at the age of 16 to Miguel Magaña, who was 14 years her senior. They divorced a year later. In 1979, she was named The Voice of Heraldo, starred in the musical La Pandilla and participated in the 8th Mexican national selection for the OTI Festival. In 1980, she recorded her first album and in 1981, she won the "Best Singer Award" at the Yamaha Festival in Japan. That same year, she married Raúl Canessa, the brother of Uruguayan football player, Julio Canessa. In 1984, she starred in Joseph and the Amazing Technicolor Dreamcoat and recorded her second album, María del Sol. Mágico was her third album, released in 1985. In 1986, she had one of her best hits, "Un nuevo amor" with her husband acting as manager.

In 1988, she won the 17th Mexican national selection for the OTI Festival with the song "Contigo y con el mundo", and thus represented Mexico in the OTI Festival 1988 where she placed fifth. In 1991, she starred in Cats. She later recorded the album Llegó el amor.

== Discography ==
- RCA
  - Maria Del Sol, (1980)
  - Quiero Tu Vida (1982)
  - Maria Del Sol (1984)
  - Magico (1985)
  - Un Nuevo Amor (1986)
  - Plenitud (1987)
  - Maria (1989)
  - Contigo Y Con El Mundo: Lo Mejor De Maria Del Sol (1990)
  - Volver Al Amor (1991)
  - Cats: Original Cast Recording (Mexico's Production) (1992)
  - Llego El Amor (2002)
  - Soy Mama (2005)

== At the OTI Festival ==
María del Sol participated seven times in the Mexican national selection for the OTI Festival as a singer; winning the 17th edition with the song "Contigo y con el mundo", and thus representing Mexico in the OTI Festival 1988, where she placed fifth.

Participations in the Mexican national selection for the OTI festival
Year	Song	Performer	Songwriter	Result
1979	"Desde hoy he decidido"	María del Sol	Graciela González	Eliminated in the qualifying rounds
1980	"Como quisiera"	María del Sol	María de Santos; Felipe Gil	4th in the final
1981	"Barato"	María del Sol	Joan Sebastian	Eliminated in the qualifying rounds
1984	"Ya me cansé"	María del Sol	Guillermo Méndez Guiú; Michelle Guiú	Eliminated in the third qualifying round
1985	"Mágico"	María del Sol	Carlos Lara	5th in the final
1986	"No prometas lo que no será"	María del Sol and Jorge Muñiz	Jorge Muñiz	2nd in the final
1988	"Contigo y con el mundo"	María del Sol	Miguel Alfonso Luna; José María Frías	1st in the final

Participations in the OTI festival
Year	Country	Song	Performer	Songwriter	Result
1988	Mexico	"Contigo y con el mundo"	María del Sol	Miguel Alfonso Luna; José María Frías	5th
