= Mexico in the OTI Festival 1984 =

- OTI Festival 1984
- Participating broadcaster: Televisa
- Country: Mexico
- Selection process: National OTI Festival
- Selection date: 30 September 1984

Competing entry
- Song: "Tiempos mejores"
- Artist: Yuri
- Songwriter: Sergio Andrade

Placement
- Final result: 3rd

Participation chronology
◄1983 •	1984	• 1985►

Mexico was represented at the OTI Festival 1984 with the song "Tiempos mejores", written by Sergio Andrade, and performed by Yuri. The Mexican participating broadcaster, Televisa, selected its entry through a national televised competition with several phases. The song, that was performed in position 15, placed third out of 21 competing entries. In addition, Televisa was also the host broadcaster and staged the event at the National Auditorium in Mexico City.

== National stage ==
Televisa held a national competition with four televised qualifying rounds, two semi-finals, and a final to select its entry for the 13th edition of the OTI Festival. This thirteenth edition of the National OTI Festival featured twenty-eight songs in the qualifying rounds, twelve in the semi-finals, and six in the final. In addition to the general competition, awards were given for Best Male Performer, Best Female Performer, Best Musical Arrangement, Breakout Male Artist, and Breakout Female Artist among all the competing artists.

The shows were held at the National Auditorium in Mexico City, were presented by Raúl Velasco, and were broadcast on Canal 2. The musical director was Chucho Ferrrer, who conducted the orchestra when required.

Competing entries on the National OTI Festival – Mexico 1984
Song	Artist	Songwriter(s)	Conductor
"Ahora te extraño"	Víctor Yturbe	Gil Rivera	
"Amaneció"	José Alberto Fuentes	José Alberto Fuentes	
"Cambiaste tú la historia"	Fernando Riba	Fernando Riba	Armando Noriega
"Embrujada"	Carminna	Jorge Macías Gómez	
"Estoy arrepentido"	Johnny Laboriel	Morris Lan; David Lan	Eugenio Castillo
"Golondrina esperada"	Mario Molina Moro	Mario Molina Montes; Martha Rincon	
"Lástima"	Claudián	Guillermo Estrada; Rafael Armenta	Chucho Ferrer
"Mi heroe"	Sonia Rivas	Marco Antonio Solís; Sonia Rivas	
"Mi oficio"	José Roberto	José Roberto	Luigi Lazareno
"Niña Mágica"	Julián	Gil Rivera	Chucho Ferrer
"No me digas adiós"	María del Rayo	Enrique Velázquez; Juan Antonio Morales; Carlos Blanco	
"Nube Viajera"	Humberto Cravioto	José Macías	Eduardo Magallanes
"Por fin llegó el amor"	Morenita	Carlos Vargas	
"¿Por qué no puedo ser feliz?"	Rafael Amador	Óscar Athie	
"Por un poquito de amor"	Arianna	Jorge Jurado; Sergio Jurado; Arianna	
"¿Quién después de ti?"	Mario Castelli	Octavio	
"¿Quién es ella?"	Antonio de Jesús	Antonio de Jesús	
"Se me cansó el corazón"	Prisma	Sylvia Tapia	Manuel Cervantes
"Seis y diez"	Mariana Maesse	Francisco Curiel; Mariana Maesse	
"Sigue adelante"	Mario Pintor	Mario Pintor	
"Tengo que empezar a amarte un poco más"	Óscar Athie	Óscar Athie	Óscar Flores
"Tiempos mejores"	Yuri	Sergio Andrade	Sergio Andrade
"Verte a ti"	Jorge Muñiz	Jorge Muñiz	Luis Cárdenas
"Tu manera de hacer el amor"	Hernán Visseti	Víctor Ignacio Ortega	
"Ven a mi"	Doris	Manuel A. Campos	
"Ventarrón"	Linda Casillas	Joan Sebastian	
"Volverás con el verano"	Lara and Monárrez	Carlos Lara; Jesús Monárrez	Armando Noriega
"Ya me cansé"	María del Sol	Guillermo Méndez Guiú; Michelle Guiú	

=== Qualifying rounds ===
The four qualifying rounds were held on Saturdays 18 and 25 August, and 1 and 8 September 1984. Each round featured seven entries, of which the three highest-scoring advanced to the semi-finals. In each round, after all the competing entries were performed, each of the nine jurors cast one vote for each of their three favorite entries.

The nine jurors in the qualifiying rounds were: Fernando Alcalá, Jaime Almeida, Pati Chapoy, Tito Guízar, Leopoldo Meraz, Jorge Neri, (Note: Jorge Neri was replaced in the third qualifying round by Jonathán Zarzosa.) Marcos Olivares, Eduardo Salas, and Leonardo Velázquez.

Qualifier

Result of the first qualifying round of the National OTI Festival – Mexico 1984
R/O	Song	Artist	Votes	Result
1	"Lástima"	Claudián	9	Qualified
2	"Cambiaste tú la historia"	Fernando Riba	4	Qualified
3	"Nube Viajera"	Humberto Cravioto	2	—N/a
4	"Verte a ti"	Jorge Muñiz	4	—N/a
5	"No me digas adiós"	María del Rayo	2	—N/a
6	"Golondrina esperada"	Mario Molina Moro	0	—N/a
7	"Mi heroe"	Sonia Rivas	6	Qualified

Detailed vote of the first qualifying round of the National OTI Festival – Mexico 1984
R/O	Song	Eduardo Salas	Fernando Alcalá	Jorge Neri	Pati Chapoy	Tito Guízar	Marcos Olivares	Jaime Almeida	Leopoldo Meraz	Leonardo Velázquez	Total
1	"Lástima"	1	1	1	1	1	1	1	1	1	9
2	"Cambiaste tú la historia"	1		1				1		1	4
3	"Nube Viajera"	1	1								2
4	"Verte a ti"				1		1		1	1	4
5	"No me digas adiós"		1			1					2
6	"Golondrina esperada"										0
7	"Mi heroe"			1	1	1	1	1	1		6

Result of the second qualifying round of the National OTI Festival – Mexico 1984
R/O	Song	Artist	Votes	Result
1	"Embrujada"	Carminna	4	Qualified
2	"Tu manera de hacer el amor"	Hernán Visseti	2	—N/a
3	"Estoy arrepentido"	Johnny Laboriel	0	—N/a
4	"Niña Mágica"	Julián	8	Qualified
5	"Ventarrón"	Linda Casillas	1	—N/a
6	"Seis y diez"	Mariana Maesse	4	—N/a
7	"Tengo que empezar a amarte un poco más"	Óscar Athie	8	Qualified

Detailed vote of the second qualifying round of the National OTI Festival – Mexico 1984
R/O	Song	Leopoldo Meraz	Marcos Olivares	Eduardo Salas	Jaime Almeida	Jorge Neri	Leonardo Velázquez	Pati Chapoy	Fernando Alcalá	Tito Guízar	Total
1	"Embrujada"		1	1	1			1			4
2	"Tu manera de hacer el amor"	1				1					2
3	"Estoy arrepentido"										0
4	"Niña Mágica"	1	1	1		1	1	1	1	1	8
5	"Ventarrón"				1						1
6	"Seis y diez"					1	1		1	1	4
7	"Tengo que empezar a amarte un poco más"	1	1	1	1		1	1	1	1	8

Result of the third qualifying round of the National OTI Festival – Mexico 1984
R/O	Song	Artist	Votes	Result
1	"¿Quién es ella?"	Antonio de Jesús	2	—N/a
2	"Por un poquito de amor"	Arianna	2	—N/a
3	"Volverás con el verano"	Lara and Monárrez	4	Qualified
4	"Ya me cansé"	María del Sol	4	—N/a
5	"¿Quién después de ti?"	Mario Castelli	0	—N/a
6	"Sigue adelante"	Mario Pintor	6	Qualified
7	"Se me cansó el corazón"	Prisma	9	Qualified

Detailed vote of the third qualifying round of the National OTI Festival – Mexico 1984
R/O	Song	Pati Chapoy	Eduardo Salas	Leopoldo Meraz	Marcos Olivares	Leonardo Velázquez	Tito Guízar	Jonathán Zarzosa	Jaime Almeida	Fernando Alcalá	Total
1	"¿Quién es ella?"			1	1						2
2	"Por un poquito de amor"			1			1				2
3	"Volverás con el verano"	1	1						1	1	4
4	"Ya me cansé"	1	1			1		1			4
5	"¿Quién después de ti?"										0
6	"Sigue adelante"				1	1	1	1	1	1	6
7	"Se me cansó el corazón"	1	1	1	1	1	1	1	1	1	9

Result of the fourth qualifying round of the National OTI Festival – Mexico 1984
R/O	Song	Artist	Votes	Result
1	"Ven a mi"	Doris	1	—N/a
2	"Amaneció"	José Alberto Fuentes	0	—N/a
3	"Mi oficio"	José Roberto	7	Qualified
4	"Por fin llegó el amor"	Morenita	5	Qualified
5	"¿Por qué no puedo ser feliz?"	Rafael Amador	1	—N/a
6	"Ahora te extraño"	Víctor Yturbe	4	—N/a
7	"Tiempos mejores"	Yuri	9	Qualified

Detailed vote of the fourth qualifying round of the National OTI Festival – Mexico 1984
R/O	Song	Fernando Alcalá	Tito Guízar	Jaime Almeida	Leopoldo Meraz	Leonardo Velázquez	Jorge Neri	Eduardo Salas	Marcos Olivares	Pati Chapoy	Total
1	"Ven a mi"			1							1
2	"Amaneció"										0
3	"Mi oficio"	1		1	1	1	1	1	1		7
4	"Por fin llegó el amor"	1				1	1	1		1	5
5	"¿Por qué no puedo ser feliz?"		1								1
6	"Ahora te extraño"		1		1				1	1	4
7	"Tiempos mejores"	1	1	1	1	1	1	1	1	1	9

=== Semi-finals ===
The semi-finals were held on Friday 28 and Saturday 29 September 1984. The twelve songs that qualified in the qualifying rounds were distributed between the two semi-finals, and the three most voted songs from each semi-final went on to the final.

Result of the first semi-final of the National OTI Festival – Mexico 1984
R/O	Song	Artist	Votes	Result
1	"Por fin llegó el amor"	Morenita	6	—N/a
2	"Niña Mágica"	Julián	8	Qualified
3	"Embrujada"	Carminna	2	—N/a
4	"Cambiaste tú la historia"	Fernando Riba	2	—N/a
5	"Se me cansó el corazón"	Prisma	13	Qualified
6	"Tengo que empezar a amarte un poco más"	Óscar Athie	14	Qualified

Result of the second semi-final of the National OTI Festival – Mexico 1984
R/O	Song	Artist	Votes	Result
1	"Sigue adelante"	Mario Pintor	1	—N/a
2	"Tiempos mejores"	Yuri	15	Qualified
3	"Volverás con el verano"	Lara and Monárrez	12	Qualified
4	"Lástima"	Claudián	2	—N/a
5	"Mi oficio"	José Roberto	15	Qualified
6	"Mi heroe"	Sonia Rivas	0	—N/a

=== Final ===
The six-song final was held on Sunday 30 September 1984. Eight jurors present in the hall for the qualifying rounds were also present for the final: Fernando Alcalá, Jaime Almeida, Pati Chapoy, Leopoldo Meraz, Jorge Neri, Marcos Olivares, Eduardo Salas, and Leonardo Velázquez; to which six new jurors were added: Vikki Carr, Marco Antonio Muñiz, Miguel Bosé, José Luis Perales, Lupita D'Alessio, and Dyango. The final was held in two rounds, shorlisting three songs for a superfinal. In the superfinal, each juror announced aloud one vote for their favourite entry.

The winner was "Tiempos mejores", written by Sergio Andrade, and performed by Yuri. The festival ended with a reprise of the winning entry.

Result of the final of the National OTI Festival – Mexico 1984
R/O	Song	Artist	Votes	Result
1	"Niña Mágica"	Julián	0	6
2	"Se me cansó el corazón"	Prisma	4	4
3	"Tengo que empezar a amarte un poco más"	Óscar Athie	3	5
4	"Tiempos mejores"	Yuri	13	Qualified
5	"Mi oficio"	José Roberto	11	Qualified
6	"Volverás con el verano"	Lara and Monárrez	11	Qualified

Winner

Result of the superfinal of the National OTI Festival – Mexico 1984
R/O	Song	Artist	Votes	Result
1	"Tiempos mejores"	Yuri	8	1
2	"Mi oficio"	José Roberto	1	3
3	"Volverás con el verano"	Lara and Monárrez	5	2

Detailed vote of the superfinal of the National OTI Festival – Mexico 1984
R/O	Song	Jaime Almeida	Leopoldo Meraz	Vikki Carr	Marco Antonio Muñiz	Eduardo Salas	Pati Chapoy	Miguel Bosé	Jorge Neri	Marcos Olivares	Fernando Alcalá	José Luis Perales	Lupita D'Alessio	Leonardo Velázquez	Dyango	Total
1	"Tiempos mejores"	1	1			1	1		1	1		1		1		8
2	"Mi oficio"				1											1
3	"Volverás con el verano"			1				1			1		1		1	5

=== Merit awards ===
In the final, the fifteen jurors voted aloud for the Best Male and Female Performer and Breakout Male and Female Artist among the three shortlisted artist in each category. The members of the orchestra voted for the Best Musical Arrangement Award among the three entries shortlisted.

José Roberto received the Best Male Performer Award; Yuri the Best Female Performer Award; Sergio Andrade the Best Musical Arrangement Award for "Tiempos mejores"; Jorge Muñiz the Breakout Male Artist Award; and Morenita the Breakout Female Artist Award.

=== Official album ===
Las 12 triunfadoras del Festival OTI 84 is the official compilation album of the thirteenth edition of the Mexican National OTI Festival, released by Melody in 1984. The vinyl LP features the studio version of the twelve songs qualified for the semi-finals.

== At the OTI Festival ==
On 10 November 1984, the OTI Festival was held at the National Auditorium in Mexico City, hosted by Televisa, and broadcast live throughout Ibero-America. Yuri performed "Tiempos mejores" in position 15, with Sergio Andrade conducting the event's orchestra, and placing third of 21 competing entries.
