= Mexico in the OTI Festival 1986 =

- OTI Festival 1986
- Participating broadcaster: Televisa
- Country: Mexico
- Selection process: National OTI Festival
- Selection date: 5 October 1986

Competing entry
- Song: "De color de rosa"
- Artist: Prisma
- Songwriter: Sylvia Tapia

Placement
- Final result: 2nd

Participation chronology
◄1985 •	1986	• 1987►

Mexico was represented at the OTI Festival 1986 with the song "De color de rosa", written and performed by Sylvia Tapia under her stage name Prisma. The Mexican participating broadcaster, Televisa, selected its entry through a national televised competition with several phases. The song, that was performed in position 1, placed second out of 20 competing entries.

== National stage ==
Televisa held a national competition with three televised qualifying rounds, a playoff, a semi-final, and a final to select its entry for the 15th edition of the OTI Festival. This fifteenth edition of the National OTI Festival featured twenty-one songs in the qualifying rounds, twelve in the semi-final, and six in the final. In addition to the general competition, awards were given for Best Male Performer, Best Female Performer, Best Musical Arrangement, Breakout Male Artist, and Breakout Female Artist among all the competing artists.

The qualifying rounds were held at Studio 2 of Televisa San Ángel in Mexico City, while the semi-final and the final were held at Teatro Degollado in Guadalajara, all presented by Raúl Velasco, and broadcast on Canal 2. The musical director was Chucho Ferrrer, who conducted the orchestra when required.

Competing entries on the National OTI Festival – Mexico 1986
Song	Artist	Songwriter(s)	Conductor
"A tu lado"	Ana Gabriel	Ana Gabriel	Jesús Medel
"Amada enemiga"	Gibrán	Amparo Rubín	Ruben Zepeda
"Aquí me tienes"	Mario Pintor	Mario Pintor	Julio Jaramillo
"¡Ay, quiéreme!"	Jaime Santini	Sylvia Tapia	Elías Amábilis
"Cambios"	Susy Montañez	Francisco Curiel; Sergio Mobame	Francisco Curiel
"Como ninguna"	Arianna	Marco Flores	Jesús Medel
"Con las alas abiertas"	Crystal	Felipe Gil; Mario Arturo	Chucho Ferrer
"Coraje"	Manuel Ascanio	Roberto Zuky	Pepe Cantoral
"De color de rosa"	Prisma	Sylvia Tapia	Julio Jaramillo
"El traje de aquel que ama"	Alberto Ángel	Alberto Ángel	Julio Jaramillo
"Héroe de comedia"	Yoshio	Ruben Zepeda; Yoshio	Ruben Zepeda
"Ilusión"	Joan Sebastian	Joan Sebastian	Arturo Salas
"Junto a ti"	Pepe y J.R.	Francisco Curiel; José de Jesús Ibarra; Juan Ramos Ibarra	Francisco Curiel
"No prometas lo que no será"	María del Sol and Jorge Muñiz	Jorge Muñiz	Eduardo Magallanes
"No tiene sentido"	José Alberto Fuentes	José Alberto Fuentes	Jorge René González
"Sinceridad"	Rocío Banquells	Carlos Lara; Jesús Monárrez	Chucho Ferrer
"Solo y sin ti"	Víctor Yturbe	Gabriel del Río; Chamín Correa	Chucho Ferrer
"Soñador"	Manuel Mijares	Alfredo Díaz Ordaz	Antonio de los Cobos
"Tuyo"	Óscar Athié	Óscar Athié	
"Va llorando soledad"	Sonia Rivas	Federico Méndez	Arturo Martínez
"Yo soy"	José Roberto	José Roberto	Luigi Lazareno

=== Qualifying rounds ===
The three qualifying rounds were held on Saturdays 6, 13, and 20 September 1986. Each round featured seven entries, of which the three highest-scoring advanced to the semi-final. In each round, after all the competing entries were performed, each of the eight jurors cast one vote for each of their three favorite entries.

Qualifier

Result of the first qualifying round of the National OTI Festival – Mexico 1986
R/O	Song	Artist	Votes	Result
1	"Con las alas abiertas"	Crystal	6	Qualified
2	"Amada enemiga"	Gibrán	2	—N/a
3	"Ilusión"	Joan Sebastian	4	Qualified
4	"Yo soy"	José Roberto	2	—N/a
5	"Tuyo"	Óscar Athié	1	—N/a
6	"Junto a ti"	Pepe y J.R.	2	—N/a
7	"De color de rosa"	Prisma	7	Qualified

Result of the second qualifying round of the National OTI Festival – Mexico 1986
R/O	Song	Artist	Votes	Result
1	"A tu lado"	Ana Gabriel	4	—N/a
2	"Como ninguna"	Arianna	5	Qualified
3	"Coraje"	Manuel Ascanio	5	Qualified
4	"Aquí me tienes"	Mario Pintor	4	—N/a
5	"Va llorando soledad"	Sonia Rivas	5	Qualified
6	"Cambios"	Susy Montañez	0	—N/a
7	"Solo y sin ti"	Víctor Yturbe	1	—N/a

Result of the third qualifying round of the National OTI Festival – Mexico 1986
R/O	Song	Artist	Votes	Result
1	"El traje de aquel que ama"	Alberto Ángel	3	—N/a
2	"¡Ay, quiéreme!"	Jaime Santini	0	—N/a
3	"No tiene sentido"	José Alberto Fuentes	3	—N/a
4	"No prometas lo que no será"	María del Sol and Jorge Muñiz	6	Qualified
5	"Soñador"	Manuel Mijares	6	Qualified
6	"Sinceridad"	Rocío Banquells	5	Qualified
7	"Héroe de comedia"	Yoshio	1	—N/a

=== Playoff ===
The playoff was held on Saturday 20 September 1986 following the third qualifying round. To select the last three semi-finalists, each of the eight jurors cast one vote for each of their three favorite entries among the twelve not qualified.

Result of the playoff of the National OTI Festival – Mexico 1986
Song	Result
"A tu lado"	Qualified
"Amada enemiga"	—N/a
"Aquí me tienes"	—N/a
"¡Ay, quiéreme!"	—N/a
"Cambios"	—N/a
"El traje de aquel que ama"	Qualified
"Héroe de comedia"	—N/a
"Junto a ti"	Qualified
"No tiene sentido"	—N/a
"Solo y sin ti"	—N/a
"Tuyo"	—N/a
"Yo soy"	—N/a

=== Semi-final ===
The semi-final was held on Saturday 4 October 1986. After all the competing entries were performed, each of the ten jurors cast one vote for each of their six favorite entries, and the six most voted songs went on to the final.

Result of the semi-final of the National OTI Festival – Mexico 1986
R/O	Song	Artist	Votes	Result
1	"Ilusión"	Joan Sebastian	5	—N/a
2	"Con las alas abiertas"	Crystal	2	—N/a
3	"Junto a ti"	Pepe y J.R.	1	—N/a
4	"Como ninguna"	Arianna	6	Qualified
5	"Coraje"	Manuel Ascanio	8	Qualified
6	"Va llorando soledad"	Sonia Rivas	4	—N/a
7	"Soñador"	Manuel Mijares	9	Qualified
8	"Sinceridad"	Rocío Banquells	0	—N/a
9	"El traje de aquel que ama"	Alberto Ángel	1	—N/a
10	"A tu lado"	Ana Gabriel	7	Qualified
11	"De color de rosa"	Prisma	10	Qualified
12	"No prometas lo que no será"	María del Sol and Jorge Muñiz	7	Qualified

=== Final ===
The six-song final was held on Sunday 5 October 1986. The show featured a guest performance by Camilo Sesto.

The final was held in two rounds. In the first round, each of the ten jurors cast one vote for each of their three favorite entries, and the three most voted songs went on to the superfinal. In the superfinal, each juror announced aloud one vote for their favourite entry. The ten jurors were: Jaime Almeida, Pati Chapoy, Eugenia León, Ramón Márquez, Rafael Martínez Amador, Lupe Mejía, Leopoldo Meraz, José Luis Perales, Eduardo Salas, and Guillermo Vázquez.

The winner was "De color de rosa", written and performed by Sylvia Tapia under her stage name Prisma; with "No prometas lo que no será", written by Jorge Muñiz and performed by María del Sol and Jorge Muñiz, placing second; and "Soñador", written by Alfredo Díaz Ordaz and performed by Manuel Mijares, placing third. The festival ended with a reprise of the winning entry.

Result of the final of the National OTI Festival – Mexico 1986
R/O	Song	Artist	Votes	Result
1	"A tu lado"	Ana Gabriel	1	5
2	"Coraje"	Manuel Ascanio	5	4
3	"Como ninguna"	Arianna	1	5
4	"No prometas lo que no será"	María del Sol and Jorge Muñiz	7	Qualified
5	"De color de rosa"	Prisma	10	Qualified
6	"Soñador"	Manuel Mijares	6	Qualified

Winner

Result of the superfinal of the National OTI Festival – Mexico 1986
R/O	Song	Artist	Votes	Result
1	"No prometas lo que no será"	María del Sol and Jorge Muñiz	4	2
2	"De color de rosa"	Prisma	5	1
3	"Soñador"	Manuel Mijares	1	3

Detailed vote of the superfinal of the National OTI Festival – Mexico 1986
R/O	Song	Jaime Almeida	Eugenia León	Leopoldo Meraz	Eduardo Salas	Pati Chapoy	Guillermo Vázquez	Lupe Mejía	Ramón Márquez	José Luis Perales	Rafael Martínez	Total
1	"No prometas lo que no será"		1	1		1	1					4
2	"De color de rosa"	1			1			1	1		1	5
3	"Soñador"									1		1

=== Merit awards ===
In the final, the jurors voted for the Best Male and Female Performer, Best Musical Arrangement, and Breakout Male and Female Artist among the three shortlisted artist in each category.

Víctor Yturbe received the Best Male Performer Award; Rocío Banquells the Best Female Performer Award; Julio Jaramillo the Best Musical Arrangement Award for "De color de rosa"; and Manuel Mijares the Breakout Male Artist Award.

Best Male Performer
Artist	Result
Alberto Ángel	—N/a
Víctor Yturbe	1
Manuel Ascanio	—N/a

Best Female Performer
Artist	Result
Arianna	—N/a
Prisma	—N/a
Rocío Banquells	1

Breakout Male Artist
Artist	Result
Gibrán	—N/a
Pepe y J.R.	—N/a
Manuel Mijares	1

=== Official album ===
Las 12 finalistas del Festival OTI 86 is the official compilation album of the fifteenth edition of the Mexican National OTI Festival, released by Melody in 1986. The vinyl LP features the studio version of the twelve songs qualified for the semi-final.

== At the OTI Festival ==
On 15 November 1986, the OTI Festival was held at the Municipal Theatre in Santiago, Chile, hosted by Televisión Nacional de Chile (TVN), Universidad Católica de Chile Televisión (UCTV), and Universidad de Chile Televisión (UTV), and broadcast live throughout Ibero-America. Prisma performed "De color de rosa" in position 1, with Julio Jaramillo conducting the event's orchestra, and placing second out of 20 competing entries.
