= De color de rosa =

- Cover of the original Mexican release

Single by Prisma

from the album Desde la intimidad
- Language: Spanish
- B-side: "Más vale ahora"
- Released: 1986
- Genre: Latin ballad
- Length: 3:15
- Label: Peerless Records
- Songwriter: Silvia Tapia Alcázar
- Producer: Julio Jaramillo Arenas

Prisma singles chronology
"Oiga" (1986)	"De color de rosa" (1986)	"Una dama y un señor" (1987)

Audio
- "De color de rosa" on YouTube

OTI Festival 1986 entry
- Country: Mexico
- Language: Spanish
- Conductor: Julio Jaramillo Arenas

Finals performance
- Final result: 2nd

Entry chronology
- ◄ "El fandango aquí" (1985)
- "¡Ay, amor!" (1987) ►

"De color de rosa" (transl. "Pink-Colored" or "Rose-Colored") is a 1986 song written and recorded by Mexican singer Prisma, released via Peerless Records as a single from her album Desde la intimidad. After winning the Mexican national selection, the song went on to represent the country in the OTI Festival 1986, where it ultimately came second. It resurfaced in 2025 after featuring on the Amazon Prime Video series Mentiras, la serie, where it was performed by Belinda.

== History ==
=== OTI Festival ===
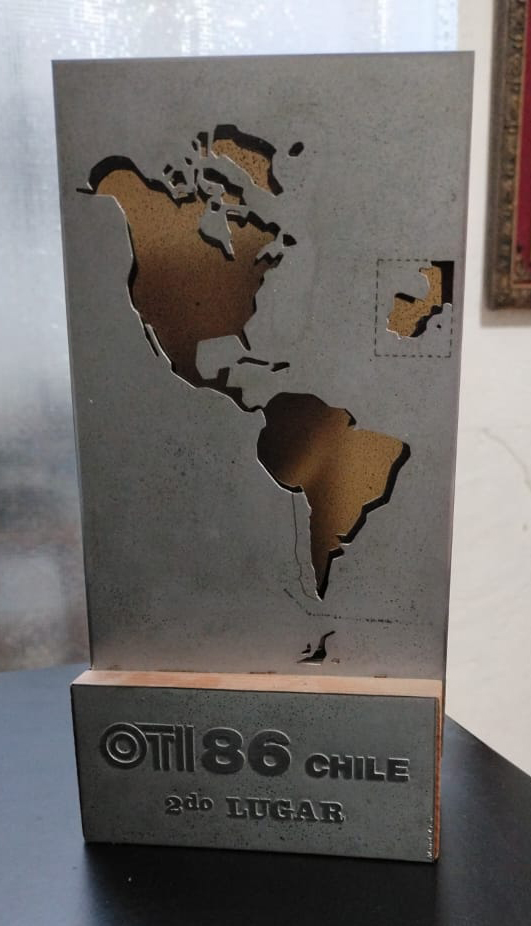
OTI Festival 1986's second-place trophy

"De color de rosa", performed by its author Silvia Tapia under her stage name Prisma, was one of the songs that participated in the 15th national selection organized by Mexican broadcaster Televisa to select its entry for the OTI Festival. After qualifying in the first qualifying round on 6 September 1986, and in the semi-final on 4 October, the song won the national final on 5 October, and thus went on to represent Mexico in the OTI Festival 1986. In the final, Julio Jaramillo received the Best Musical Arrangement Award for the song.

On 15 November 1986, the OTI Festival was held at the Municipal Theatre in Santiago, Chile, hosted by Televisión Nacional de Chile (TVN), Universidad Católica de Chile Televisión (UCTV), and Universidad de Chile Televisión (UTV), and broadcast live throughout Ibero-America. Prisma performed "De color de rosa" in position 1, with Julio Jaramillo conducting the event's orchestra, and placing second out of 20 competing entries.

=== Release ===
Prisma released "De color de rosa" via Peerless Records as a single from her album Desde la intimidad. The song was also included in Las 12 finalistas del Festival OTI 86, the official compilation album of the Mexican national selection, released by Melody. The single peaked at number 3 on Billboard's Hot Latin 50 in December 1986.

== Track listing ==
7" single – Mexico (Peerless 12359-4)

1. "De color de rosa" (Silvia Tapia Alcázar) – 3:15
2. "Más vale ahora" (Silvia Tapia Alcázar) – 3:25

== Other versions ==
- A merengue version of "De color de rosa" was recorded by Dominican artist Rubby Pérez on his debut solo album Buscando tus besos (1987). It was reportedly this song that he was performing at the Jet Set nightclub in Santo Domingo on 8 April 2025 when the roof collapsed, killing him and over 230 other people.
- In mid-2025, "De color de rosa" experienced newfound popularity in a version recorded by Belinda as part of the soundtrack for the Amazon Prime Video series Mentiras, la serie. On the premiere of the series' musical version (Mentiras: All Stars) the following October, Belinda paid homage to the song by wearing a variety of pink stage costumes.
