= Mexico in the OTI Festival 1988 =

- OTI Festival 1988
- Participating broadcaster: Televisa
- Country: Mexico
- Selection process: National OTI Festival
- Selection date: 9 October 1988

Competing entry
- Song: "Contigo y con el mundo"
- Artist: María del Sol
- Songwriters: Miguel Alfonso Luna; José María Frías

Placement
- Final result: 5th, 14 points

Participation chronology
◄1987 •	1988	• 1989►

Mexico was represented at the OTI Festival 1988 with the song "Contigo y con el mundo", written by Miguel Alfonso Luna and José María Frías, and performed by María del Sol. The Mexican participating broadcaster, Televisa, selected its entry through a national televised competition with several phases. The song, that was performed in position 4, placed fifth out of 22 competing entries, tying with the song from Uruguay with 14 points.

== National stage ==
Televisa held a national competition with four televised qualifying rounds, a playoff, a semi-final, and a final to select its entry for the 17th edition of the OTI Festival. This seventeenth edition of the National OTI Festival featured twenty-four songs in the qualifying rounds, twelve in the semi-final, and six in the final. In addition to the general competition, awards were given for Best Male Performer, Best Female Performer, Best Musical Arrangement, Breakout Male Artist, Breakout Female Artist, and Best Group among all the competing artists.

The shows were held at Teatro de la Ciudad in Mexico City, were presented by Raúl Velasco, and broadcast on Canal 2. The musical director was Chucho Ferrrer, who conducted the orchestra when required.

Competing entries on the National OTI Festival – Mexico 1988
Song	Artist	Songwriter(s)	Conductor
"Alguien en la ciudad"	Erika Buenfil	Carlos Lara; Jesús Monárrez	Eduardo Magallanes
"Borrón y cuenta nueva"	Rosenda Bernal	Sylvia Tapia	Chucho Ferrer
"Contigo y con el mundo"	María del Sol	Miguel Alfonso Luna; José María Frías	Jesús Medel
"Cuenta conmigo"	Juan Santana	Juan Santana; Jesús Monárrez	Jesús Monárrez
"Deshonra de amor"	Óscar Athié	Óscar Athié; Marco Flores	Marco Flores
"Él se va"	Gibrán	Alejandro Filio	Chucho Ferrer
"Entre el cielo y el infierno"	José María Lobo	José María Lobo	Chucho Ferrer
"Háblame de amor"	Laura Flores	Laura Flores	Pepe Hernández
"Hay luz debajo"	Alejandro Filio	Alejandro Filio	
"La reina de los colibríes"	Mayté	Edson	Jesús Medel
"Me están matando los celos"	José María Napoleón	José María Napoleón	Eduardo Magallanes
"Ni antes ni después"	María Medina	Amparo Rubín	Chucho Ferrer
"No hay vuelta de hoja"	Magdalena Zárate and Pablo Raffi	Amparo Rubín	Pepe Stiphens
"No hubo otro igual"	Francisco Xavier	Francisco Xavier	Eduardo Magallanes
"No sé cómo pudiste"	Crystal	Pedro Alberto Cárdenas	Pedro Alberto Cárdenas
"Seré, será"	Prisma	Sylvia Tapia	
"Siglo XXI"	Byanka	Alfredo Gil; José T. Martínez	Luigi Lazareno
"Soy un ser humano"	Doris	Roxana Rosas	Ricardo Toral
"Triunfo"	Sergio Ruiz	Sergio Ruiz	
"Tú sabes cómo amarme"	Grupo Viva Voz	Marco Flores	Marco Flores
"Tú y yo"	Lolita Cortés	Mauricio Abarca	Rubén Zepeda
"Un grito"	Carmín	Gabriela Martínez de la Mora	Eduardo Magallanes
"Y cuando el sol te nombra"	Alberto Ángel	Alberto Ángel	Eduardo Magallanes
"Y es que te amo"	Dueto Jade	Pedro Alberto Cárdenas; Francisco Curiel	Pedro Alberto Cárdenas

=== Qualifying rounds ===
The four qualifying rounds were held on Saturdays 10, 17, and 24 September, and 1 October 1988. Each round featured six entries, of which the two highest-scoring advanced to the semi-final. In each round, after all the competing entries were performed, each of the ten jurors cast one vote for each of their two favorite entries.

Qualifier

Result of the first qualifying round of the National OTI Festival – Mexico 1988
R/O	Song	Artist	Votes	Result
1	"Triunfo"	Sergio Ruiz	0	—N/a
2	"Entre el cielo y el infierno"	José María Lobo	1	—N/a
3	"No sé cómo pudiste"	Crystal	7	Qualified
4	"Alguien en la ciudad"	Erika Buenfil	1	—N/a
5	"No hubo otro igual"	Francisco Xavier	8	Qualified
6	"Háblame de amor"	Laura Flores	3	—N/a

Result of the second qualifying round of the National OTI Festival – Mexico 1988
R/O	Song	Artist	Votes	Result
1	"Soy un ser humano"	Doris	0	—N/a
2	"Deshonra de amor"	Óscar Athié	4	—N/a
3	"Borrón y cuenta nueva"	Rosenda Bernal	0	—N/a
4	"Y es que te amo"	Dueto Jade	6	Qualified
5	"Y cuando el sol te nombra"	Alberto Ángel	3	—N/a
6	"Tú sabes cómo amarme"	Grupo Viva Voz	7	Qualified

Result of the third qualifying round of the National OTI Festival – Mexico 1988
R/O	Song	Artist	Votes	Result
1	"Siglo XXI"	Byanka	0	—N/a
2	"Hay luz debajo"	Alejandro Filio	5	Qualified
3	"La reina de los colibríes"	Mayté	0	—N/a
4	"Tú y yo"	Lolita Cortés	4	—N/a
5	"No hay vuelta de hoja"	Magdalena Zárate and Pablo Raffi	6	Qualified
6	"Me están matando los celos"	José María Napoleón	5	Qualified

Result of the fourth qualifying round of the National OTI Festival – Mexico 1988
R/O	Song	Artist	Votes	Result
1	"Un grito"	Carmín	2	—N/a
2	"Él se va"	Gibrán	1	—N/a
3	"Ni antes ni después"	María Medina	6	Qualified
4	"Cuenta conmigo"	Juan Santana	2	—N/a
5	"Seré, será"	Prisma	0	—N/a
6	"Contigo y con el mundo"	María del Sol	9	Qualified

=== Playoff ===
The playoff was held on Saturday 1 October 1988 following the fourth qualifying round. To select the last three semi-finalists, each of the ten jurors cast one vote for each of their three favorite entries among the fifteen not qualified.

Result of the playoff of the National OTI Festival – Mexico 1988
Song	Result
"Alguien en la ciudad"	—N/a
"Borrón y cuenta nueva"	—N/a
"Cuenta conmigo"	—N/a
"Deshonra de amor"	Qualified
"Él se va"	—N/a
"Entre el cielo y el infierno"	—N/a
"Háblame de amor"	Qualified
"La reina de los colibríes"	—N/a
"Seré, será"	—N/a
"Siglo XXI"	—N/a
"Soy un ser humano"	—N/a
"Triunfo"	—N/a
"Tú y yo"	Qualified
"Un grito"	—N/a
"Y cuando el sol te nombra"	—N/a

=== Semi-final ===
The semi-final was held on Saturday 8 October 1988. After all the competing entries were performed, each of the thirteen jurors cast one vote for each of their six favorite entries, and the six most voted songs went on to the final.

Result of the semi-final of the National OTI Festival – Mexico 1988
R/O	Song	Artist	Votes	Result
1	"Tú y yo"	Lolita Cortés	3	—N/a
2	"Y es que te amo"	Dueto Jade	11	Qualified
3	"Deshonra de amor"	Óscar Athié	4	—N/a
4	"No sé cómo pudiste"	Crystal	2	—N/a
5	"Hay luz debajo"	Alejandro Filio	7	Qualified
6	"Tú sabes cómo amarme"	Grupo Viva Voz	10	Qualified
7	"Contigo y con el mundo"	María del Sol	13	Qualified
8	"No hubo otro igual"	Francisco Xavier	3	—N/a
9	"Háblame de amor"	Laura Flores	3	—N/a
10	"Me están matando los celos"	José María Napoleón	4	—N/a
11	"No hay vuelta de hoja"	Magdalena Zárate and Pablo Raffi	8	Qualified
12	"Ni antes ni después"	María Medina	10	Qualified

=== Final ===
The six-song final was held on Sunday 9 October 1988. Each of the twelve jurors cast one vote for each of their three favorite entries.

The winner was "Contigo y con el mundo", written by Miguel Alfonso Luna and José María Frías, and performed by María del Sol. The festival ended with a reprise of the winning entry.

Winner

Result of the final of the National OTI Festival – Mexico 1988
R/O	Song	Artist	Votes	Result
1	"Ni antes ni después"	María Medina	5	3
2	"Hay luz debajo"	Alejandro Filio	5	4
3	"Y es que te amo"	Dueto Jade	3	5
4	"Tú sabes cómo amarme"	Grupo Viva Voz	6	2
5	"Contigo y con el mundo"	María del Sol	12	1
6	"No hay vuelta de hoja"	Magdalena Zárate and Pablo Raffi	5	4

=== Merit awards ===
In the final, the jurors voted for the Best Male and Female Performer, Best Musical Arrangement, Breakout Male and Female Artist, and Best Group among the shortlisted artist in each category.

Juan Santana received the Best Male Performer Award; María del Sol the Best Female Performer Award; Eduardo Magallanes the Best Musical Arrangement Award for "No hubo otro igual"; Alejandro Filio the Breakout Male Artist Award; Mayté the Breakout Female Artist Award, and Magdalena Zárate and Pablo Raffi the Best Group Award.

=== Official album ===
Los 12 finalistas del Festival OTI 88 is the official compilation album of the seventeenth edition of the Mexican National OTI Festival, released by Melody Internacional in 1988. The vinyl LP features the studio version of the twelve songs qualified for the semi-final.

== At the OTI Festival ==
On 19 November 1988, the OTI Festival was held at the Teatro Nacional Cervantes in Buenos Aires, Argentina, hosted by Argentina Televisora Color (ATC), and broadcast live throughout Ibero-America. María del Sol performed "Contigo y con el mundo" in position 4, with Jesús Medel conducting the event's orchestra, and placing fifth out of 22 competing entries, tying with the song from Uruguay with 14 points.
