= Mexico in the OTI Festival 1980 =

- OTI Festival 1980
- Participating broadcaster: Televisa
- Country: Mexico
- Selection process: National OTI Festival
- Selection date: 21 September 1980

Competing entry
- Song: "Sólo te amo a ti"
- Artist: José Roberto
- Songwriter: José Roberto

Placement
- Final result: 8th, 21 points

Participation chronology
◄1979 •	1980	• 1981►

Mexico was represented at the OTI Festival 1980 with the song "Sólo te amo a ti", written and performed by José Roberto. The Mexican participating broadcaster, Televisa, selected its entry through a national televised competition with several phases. The song, that was performed in position 17, placed eighth out of 23 competing entries, with 21 points.

== National stage ==
Televisa held a national competition with four televised qualifying rounds and a final to select its entry for the 9th edition of the OTI Festival. This ninth edition of the National OTI Festival featured forty songs, of which ten reached the final. In addition to the general competition, awards were given for Best Male Performer, Best Female Performer, Best Musical Arrangement, and Breakout Artist, among all the competing artists.

The shows were held at Teatro de la Ciudad in Mexico City, were presented by Raúl Velasco, and were broadcast on Canal 2. The musical director was Chucho Ferrrer, who conducted the Single Union of Music Workers of Mexico orchestra when required. Hermanos Zavala, the single mixed backing choir of four voices, were credited on the songs they accompanied.

Competing entries on the National OTI Festival – Mexico 1980
Song	Artist	Songwriter(s)	Conductor
"A pesar de todo"	Irasema	Irasema	
"Aldeana de madera preludio a mi guitarra"	Amparo Rubín	Amparo Rubín	Eugenio Castillo
"Amor por ti"	Manuel Adrián	Mario Arturo; Mario Patrón	
"Amor sin tiempo"	Johnny Laboriel	Alberto Candela	
"Bandolero"	Joan Sebastian	Joan Sebastian	Chucho Ferrer
"Ciclón"	Arianna	Amparo Rubín	
"Como quisiera"	María del Sol	María de Santos; Felipe Gil	Armando Noriega
"Dama del viento"	Héctor Meneses	Héctor Meneses	
"Debutantes"	Carlos Lara	Carlos Lara	Eduardo Magallanes
"Duerme"	Luis Daniel and Sergio	Héctor Meneses	
"El nuevo día"	Martha Eugenia	Arturo García Tenorio	Armando Noriega
"Estoy tan sola"	Rosalba	Guillermo Méndez Guiú	
"Hoy lo entiendo"	Fabián Lavalle	Jorge Carlos Castro	
"Hoy es el mañana"	Yoshio	Mario Molina Montes; Alberto Ángel	Guillermo Méndez Guiú
"La última mujer en mi vida"	Arturo Castro	Arturo Castro	
"Le vino grande mi amor, señor"	Laura Zapata	Roberto Robles	Luis Cárdenas
"Mañana comienza la vida"	Lupita Deneken	Nacho Méndez	Nacho Méndez
"Mi canción eres tú"	Grupo Tabasco	Grupo Tabasco	Chucho Ferrer
"Niña de oro y pan"	Hernán Rocha	Hernán Rocha	Rodolfo Rey
"Nuestro amor de cada día"	Sergio Esquivel	Sergio Esquivel	
"Para ti"	Sola	Mario Arturo; Alejandro Prieto; Jonathán Zarzosa	Jonathán Zarzosa
"Perdóname"	José Alberto Fuentes	José Alberto Fuentes	Jonathán Zarzosa
"Por creer en ti"	Javier de León	Edmon Nayen	
"Porque te quiero"	Aria 8	Ragoso; Rodolfo Rey	Armando Noriega
"Pregúntate"	Juan Diego	José María Napoleón	Chucho Ferrer
"¿Quién partirá?"	Gualberto Castro	Roberto Cantoral	Chucho Ferrer
"Quiero hablar de amor"	Gilda	Sergio Esquivel	
"Sé amar"	Ramiro José Esperanza	Ramiro José Esperanza	Guillermo Méndez Guiú
"Se solicita una aventura"	Lila Deneken	Roberto Cantoral	Chucho Ferrer
"Sólo te amo a ti"	José Roberto	José Roberto	Javier Macías
"Sólo una noche"	Natalia Baeza	Natalia Baeza	Eduardo Magallanes
"Tarde"	Prisma	Sylvia Tapia	
"Tengo costumbre"	Carlos Lico	Víctor Arce	
"Tú"	Benny Ibarra	Benny Ibarra	
"Un amor, una sonrisa"	Roy	Enrique Esparza Oteo	
"Volvería a empezar"	Víctor Yturbe	Álvaro Dávila	Guillermo Méndez Guiú
"Volverte a enamorar"	Yvonne and Guillermo	Guillermo Méndez Guiú	
"Yo escogí mi compañero"	Ga-bí	Enrique Velázquez	
"Y después de todo"	Felipe Gil	Felipe Gil	Chucho Ferrer
"Yo no puedo estar sin ti"	Ricardo López	Chamín Correa	

=== Qualifying rounds ===
There were four qualifying rounds with ten entries each, of which the ten highest-scoring entries among the 40 competing advanced to the final. Ten expert jurors were present in the hall, and five provincial juries of five members each were located remotely. Each of the present ten jurors and the five remote juries scored between 2 and 7 points all the entries. The provincial juries, which voted via telephone, had a stand in juror each in the hall in case of communication failure during voting. In case of a tie for tenth place, the jurors in the hall would break the tie so that only ten entries would pass to the final.

The jurors present in the hall were: Guillermo Infante, Gustavo Páez, Juan Calderón, Lourdes Guerrero, Raúl Cervantes Ayala, Eduardo Linares, Eduardo Laso, Sergio Romano, José Gutiérrez Vivó, and Alicia Colmenares, who was the chairperson. Ignacio Morales was the stand in juror, in case any juror could not vote due to a conflict of interest.

Each of the performers received on stage a diploma of participation after their performance. The fourth qualifying round featured a guest performance by Angélica María.

Qualifier

Result of the qualifying rounds of the National OTI Festival – Mexico 1980
R/O	Song	Artist	Points	Result
First qualifying round – 16 August 1980
1	"Tarde"	Prisma	73	—N/a
2	"Un amor, una sonrisa"	Roy	57	—N/a
3	"Estoy tan sola"	Rosalba	57	—N/a
4	"Amor por ti"	Manuel Adrián	69	—N/a
5	"Por creer en ti"	Javier de León	73	—N/a
6	"Duerme"	Luis Daniel and Sergio	63	—N/a
7	"A pesar de todo"	Irasema	75	—N/a
8	"Tú"	Benny Ibarra	42	—N/a
9	"Aldeana de madera preludio a mi guitarra"	Amparo Rubín	79	—N/a
10	"Amor sin tiempo"	Johnny Laboriel	77	—N/a
Second qualifying round – 23 August 1980
1	"Volverte a enamorar"	Yvonne and Guillermo	51	—N/a
2	"Hoy lo entiendo"	Fabián Lavalle	57	—N/a
3	"Yo no puedo estar sin ti"	Ricardo López	75	—N/a
4	"Quiero hablar de amor"	Gilda	73	—N/a
5	"Dama del viento"	Héctor Meneses	69	—N/a
6	"Tengo costumbre"	Carlos Lico	68	—N/a
7	"Yo escogí mi compañero"	Ga-bí	59	—N/a
8	"Le vino grande mi amor, señor"	Laura Zapata	80	Qualified
9	"Sólo te amo a ti"	José Roberto	90	Qualified
10	"Ciclón"	Arianna	73	—N/a
Third qualifying round – 30 August 1980
1	"Porque te quiero"	Aria 8	60	—N/a
2	"Perdóname"	José Alberto Fuentes	77	—N/a
3	"Para ti"	Sola	65	—N/a
4	"Y después de todo"	Felipe Gil	89	Qualified
5	"El nuevo día"	Martha Eugenia	70	—N/a
6	"Pregúntate"	Juan Diego	59	—N/a
7	"La última mujer en mi vida"	Arturo Castro	77	—N/a
8	"Nuestro amor de cada día"	Sergio Esquivel	85	Qualified
9	"Mañana comienza la vida"	Lupita Deneken	83	Qualified
10	"¿Quién partirá?"	Gualberto Castro	93	Qualified
Fourth qualifying round – 6 September 1980
1	"Mi canción eres tú"	Grupo Tabasco	55	—N/a
2	"Niña de oro y pan"	Hernán Rocha	66	—N/a
3	"Como quisiera"	María del Sol	86	Qualified
4	"Bandolero"	Joan Sebastian	72	—N/a
5	"Debutantes"	Carlos Lara	55	—N/a
6	"Sé amar"	Ramiro José Esperanza	63	—N/a
7	"Sólo una noche"	Natalia Baeza	65	—N/a
8	"Volvería a empezar"	Víctor Yturbe	86	Qualified
9	"Se solicita una aventura"	Lila Deneken	89	Qualified
10	"Hoy es el mañana"	Yoshio	93	Qualified

Detailed Vote of the first qualifying round
R/O	Song	Provincial juries					Jurors in the hall	Total
R/O	Song	Campeche	Chihuahua	Guadalajara	Mérida	Veracruz	Jurors in the hall	Total
1	"Tarde"	4	4	4	3	4	54	73
2	"Un amor, una sonrisa"	4	5	4	3	5	36	57
3	"Estoy tan sola"	4	5	4	2	5	37	57
4	"Amor por ti"	5	4	5	3	5	47	69
5	"Por creer en ti"	5	5	4	3	6	50	73
6	"Duerme"	5	4	3	3	5	43	63
7	"A pesar de todo"	6	6	5	5	6	47	75
8	"Tú"	4	3	3	2	5	25	42
9	"Aldeana de madera preludio a mi guitarra"	6	5	5	3	6	54	79
10	"Amor sin tiempo"	6	6	6	5	7	47	77

Detailed Vote of the second qualifying round
R/O	Song	Provincial juries					Jurors in the hall	Total
R/O	Song	Saltillo	Culiacán	Veracruz	Guadalajara	Mérida	Jurors in the hall	Total
1	"Volverte a enamorar"	4	3	4	3	3	34	51
2	"Hoy lo entiendo"	4	4	4	3	6	36	57
3	"Yo no puedo estar sin ti"	6	6	7	4	5	47	75
4	"Quiero hablar de amor"	4	5	4	3	4	53	73
5	"Dama del viento"	4	2	3	2	2	56	69
6	"Tengo costumbre"	5	5	5	4	4	45	68
7	"Yo escogí mi compañero"	4	5	6	3	3	38	59
8	"Le vino grande mi amor, señor"	4	5	4	3	3	61	80
9	"Sólo te amo a ti"	6	6	5	4	5	64	90
10	"Ciclón"	5	5	4	3	3	53	73

Detailed Vote of the third qualifying round
R/O	Song	Provincial juries					Jurors in the hall	Total
R/O	Song	Monterrey	Celaya	Mérida	Guadalajara	Veracruz	Jurors in the hall	Total
1	"Porque te quiero"	4	3	4	4	5	40	60
2	"Perdóname"	5	4	4	4	4	56	77
3	"Para ti"	4	5	4	5	6	41	65
4	"Y después de todo"	6	4	4	6	6	63	89
5	"El nuevo día"	4	5	4	4	6	47	70
6	"Pregúntate"	4	2	3	3	4	43	59
7	"La última mujer en mi vida"	5	4	4	4	5	55	77
8	"Nuestro amor de cada día"	7	6	5	6	6	55	85
9	"Mañana comienza la vida"	4	4	4	4	5	62	83
10	"¿Quién partirá?"	5	7	6	5	7	63	93

Detailed Vote of the fourth qualifying round (Note: The stand in jurors for the provincial juries were: Raquel Ortiz Tirado for Nuevo Laredo, Carlos Plancarte for Villahermosa, Carlos Betancourt for Veracruz, Jorge Echegaray for Mérida, and Armando Gómez García for Guadalajara.)
R/O	Song	Provincial juries					Jurors in the hall	Total
R/O	Song	Nuevo Laredo	Villahermosa	Veracruz	Mérida	Guadalajara	Jurors in the hall	Total
1	"Mi canción eres tú"	2	3	4	3	4	39	55
2	"Niña de oro y pan"	3	3	4	3	4	49	66
3	"Como quisiera"	4	5	5	4	5	63	86
4	"Bandolero"	4	3	4	4	5	52	72
5	"Debutantes"	2	4	3	3	3	40	55
6	"Sé amar"	3	3	4	5	4	44	63
7	"Sólo una noche"	3	3	4	3	4	48	65
8	"Volvería a empezar"	6	6	6	4	5	59	86
9	"Se solicita una aventura"	5	7	6	7	6	58	89
10	"Hoy es el mañana"	6	6	7	6	6	62	93

=== Final ===
The final was held on Sunday 21 September 1980. The same jurors present in the hall for the qualifying rounds were also present for the final, to which five international jurors also present were added. After all the competing entries were performed, each of the fifteen jurors announced aloud one vote for their favourite entry. The three songs with the most votes were awarded first, second, and third prize. In the event that the jurors unanimously voted for a single song, the score in the qualifying rounds would be taken into account for the remaining prizes. In case of a tie for the prizes, the jurors would break the tie between the tied entries, and if the tie persisted, the chairperson would decide.

The winner was "Sólo te amo a ti", written and performed by José Roberto; with "¿Quién partirá?", written by Roberto Cantoral and performed by Gualberto Castro, placing second; and "Se solicita una aventura", written by Roberto Cantoral and performed by Lila Deneken, placing third. The festival ended with a reprise of the winning entry.

Winner

Result of the final of the National OTI Festival – Mexico 1980
R/O	Song	Artist	Votes	Result
1	"¿Quién partirá?"	Gualberto Castro	4 (Note: In the tiebreaker round "¿Quién partirá?" received 8 votes and "Se solicita una aventura" received 7 votes.)	2
2	"Le vino grande mi amor, señor"	Laura Zapata	0	—N/a
3	"Mañana comienza la vida"	Lupita Deneken	1	4
4	"Y después de todo"	Felipe Gil	0	—N/a
5	"Volvería a empezar"	Víctor Yturbe	0	—N/a
6	"Hoy es el mañana"	Yoshio	0	—N/a
7	"Nuestro amor de cada día"	Sergio Esquivel	0	—N/a
8	"Como quisiera"	María del Sol	1	4
9	"Se solicita una aventura"	Lila Deneken	4	3
10	"Sólo te amo a ti"	José Roberto	5	1

Jurors
National	Guillermo Infante; Gustavo Páez; Juan Calderón; Lourdes Guerrero; Raúl Cervantes Ayala; Eduardo Linares; Eduardo Laso; Sergio Romano; José Gutiérrez Vivó; Alicia Colmenares (chairperson)
International	

=== Merit awards ===
In the final, the fifteen jurors voted aloud for the Best Male and Female Performer Awards, Best Musical Arrangement Award, and Breakout Artist Award among the shortlisted artist in each category.

Gualberto Castro received the Best Male Performer Award; Lila Deneken the Best Female Performer Award; Eduardo Magallanes the Best Musical Arrangement Award for "Sólo una noche"; and Javier de León the Breakout Artist Award.

Best Male Performer
Artist	Votes	Result
Yoshio	4	2
Gualberto Castro	11	1
Johnny Laboriel	0	3

Best Female Performer
Artist	Votes	Result
María del Sol	1	2
Ga-bí	0	3
Lila Deneken	14	1

Best Musical Arrangement
Song	Arranger	Votes	Result
"Sólo una noche"	Eduardo Magallanes	5	1
"¿Quién partirá?"	Chucho Ferrer	4	2
"Bandolero"	Chucho Ferrer	3	3
"Aldeana de madera preludio a mi guitarra"	Eugenio Castillo	3	3

Breakout Artist
Artist	Votes	Result
Javier de León	10	1
Laura Zapata	3	2
Prisma	2	3

=== Official album ===
Las 10 finalistas del Festival OTI 80 is the official compilation album of the ninth edition of the Mexican National OTI Festival, released by Raff in 1980. The vinyl LP features the studio version of the ten songs qualified for the national final.

== At the OTI Festival ==
On 15 November 1980, the OTI Festival was held at the Martín Coronado hall of the Teatro General San Martín in Buenos Aires, Argentina, hosted by Argentina Televisora Color (ATC), and broadcast live throughout Ibero-America. José Roberto performed "Sólo te amo a ti" in position 17, placing eighth out of 23 competing entries, with 21 points.

=== Voting ===
Each participating broadcaster assembled a jury who awarded 5–1 points to their five favourite songs in order of preference.

Points awarded to Mexico
Score	Country
5 points	Argentina; Nicaragua; Uruguay
4 points	Honduras
3 points	
2 points	
1 point	Puerto Rico; United States

Points awarded by Mexico
Score	Country
5 points	Puerto Rico
4 points	Chile
3 points	Colombia
2 points	Spain
1 point	Costa Rica
