= Aida Cuevas =

Mexican singer and actress

Aída Cuevas
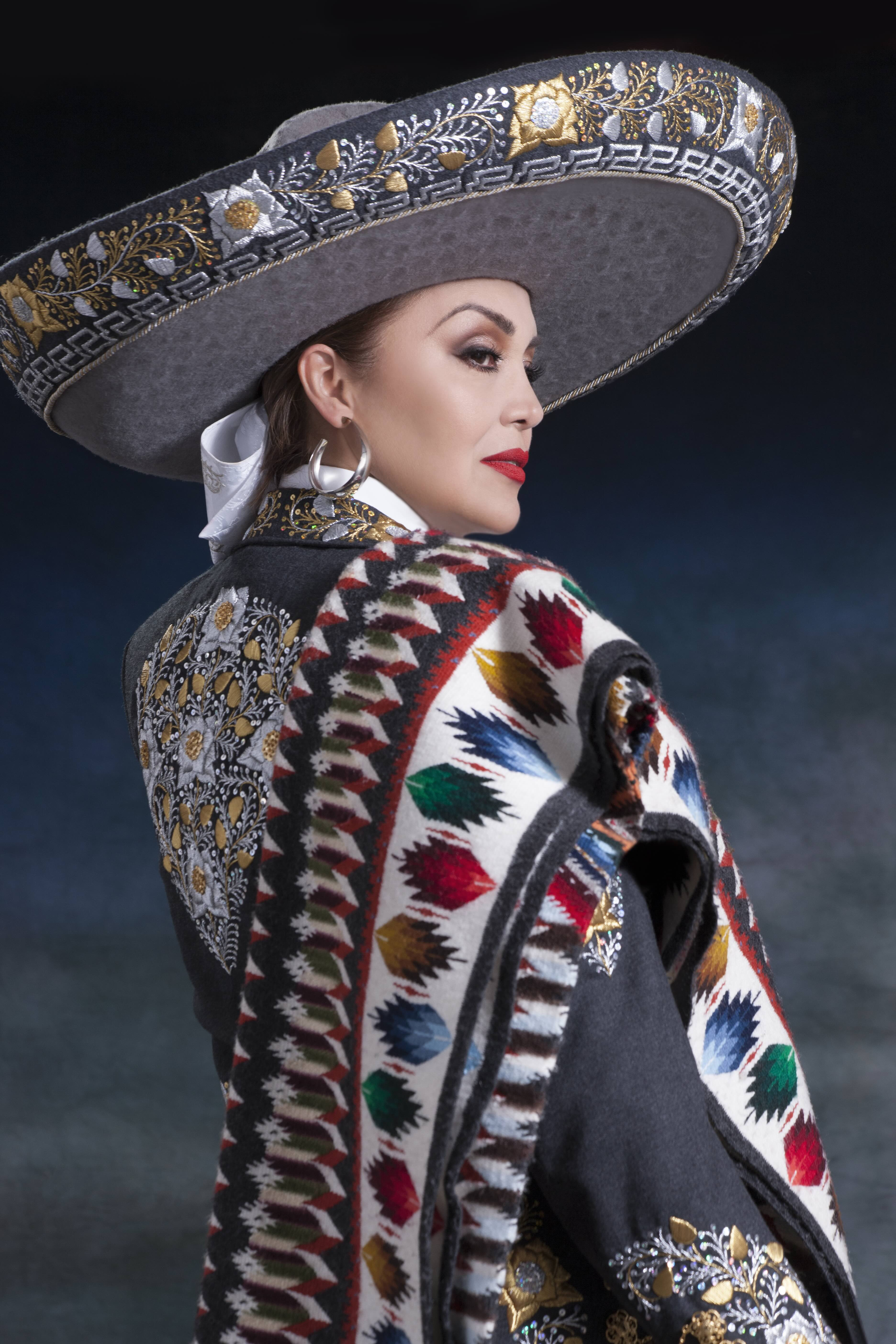
- Aida Cuevas, known as "The Queen of Ranchera Music"

Background information
- Also known as: "The Queen of Ranchera"
- Born: Aída Gabriela Cuevas Castillo; September 24, 1963 (age 62); Mexico City, Mexico
- Origin: Mexico City, Mexico
- Genres: Regional Mexican
- Occupations: Singer and Actress
- Instrument: Vocals
- Years active: 1975–present
- Labels: BMG-Ariola, IM, Sony Music, Warner Music
- Website: www.aidacuevas.com

Aída Cuevas (Spanish pronunciation: [aˈiða ˈkweβas]; born Aída Gabriela Cuevas Castillo, September 24, 1963) is a Mexican singer and actress. Affectionately known as "The Queen of Ranchera Music”, Cuevas has recorded 40 albums, selling over 10 million copies worldwide. Her work has earned her one Grammy Award and one Latin Grammy Award.

== Life ==
Aída Cuevas began singing in amateur contests at the age of 11 and was quickly discovered because of her exceptional talent. Her first national exposure was singing in a weekly live radio program called "El Taller XEW" in 1975 at the age of 12 years. A year later she was performing on stages across Europe. These performances quickly led her to be known as "La Voz de México" (The Voice of Mexico) at an early age. Her talent has led her to perform across 4 continents since 1976.

Cuevas' well-known songs are "El Pastor", "La Cigarra", "Te Doy Las Gracias", "Te Vas a Quedar Con Las Ganas", "Quizás Mañana", "Traición a Juan", "Me Equivoque Contigo", and "No Me Amenaces".

== Discography ==
Year	CD Title	Artist	Produced by
1976	Aida Cuevas con el Mariachi Continental Estrada	Aída Cuevas	José Luis Robles
1977	Para Ti	Aída Cuevas	Mario Molina Montes
1978	Los Reyes del Palenque	Aída Cuevas y Humberto Cabañas	Armando Manzanero
1979	Cari Cari	Aída Cuevas	Armando Manzanero
1980	La Palenquera	Aída Cuevas	Heriberto Aceves y Gabriel Rubio
1983	Aída Cuevas canta lo nuevo de Juan Gabriel	Aída Cuevas	Juan Gabriel
1984	Ahora y Siempre, La Voz de México	Aída Cuevas	Rigoberto Alfaro
1985	Éxitos	Aída Cuevas y Lucha Villa	Juan Gabriel
1986	Rio Crecido	Aída Cuevas	Sylvia Tapia (Prisma)
1987	Aída Cuevas canta a Juan Gabriel	Aída Cuevas	Juan Gabriel
1988	Lo Mejor de José Alfredo Jiménez	Aída Cuevas	Rigoberto Alfaro
1989	Canciones de mi pueblo	Aída Cuevas	Rigoberto Alfaro
1990	Decisión	Aída Cuevas	Rigoberto Alfaro
1991	Aida Cuevas con la Banda del Recodo	Aída Cuevas y la Banda El Recodo	Cruz Lizárraga
1992	Te Traigo Ganas	Aída Cuevas	Kiko Campos y Fernando Rivas
1992	Huapangos	Aída Cuevas	Rigoberto Alfaro
1993	Boleros, Voz y Sentimiento	Various	
1994	Éxitos	Aída Cuevas y Rocio Banquells	
1995	El Dueto del Siglo	Aída Cuevas y Carlos Cuevas	Chamín Correa
1996	Canciones Inéditas de María Grever	Aída Cuevas	Chucho Ferrer
1997	En Vivo desde El Auditorio Nacional	Aída Cuevas y Carlos Cuevas	Ignacio Morales
1998	Lucha Reyes: Remembranzas	Aída Cuevas	Rigoberto Alfaro
1999	La Reina de la Canción Ranchera	Aída Cuevas	Cutberto Pérez
2000	Los Autores del Siglo	Aída Cuevas y Carlos Cuevas	Chucho Ferrer
2001	Háblame de Amor	Aída Cuevas	Sonia Rivas
2002	Enhorabuena	Aída Cuevas	Bebu Silvetti
2004	Suite Mexicana de Agustín Lara	Aída Cuevas	
2010	De Corazón a Corazón... Mariachi Tango.	Aída Cuevas	Rodrigo Cuevas
2013	Totalmente Juan Gabriel	Aída Cuevas	Rodrigo Cuevas y Fernando de Santiago
2014	Canto a mi Tierra	Aída Cuevas	Rodrigo Cuevas
2015	Pa' Que Sientas Lo Que Siento	Aída Cuevas y Mariachi Reyna de Los Angeles	Rodrigo Cuevas y José Hernández
2017	Arrieros Somos - Versiones Acústicas	Aída Cuevas	Rodrigo Cuevas
2018	Totalmente Juan Gabriel Vol. II	Aída Cuevas	Rodrigo Cuevas
2020	Antología de la Música Ranchera, Vol. I	Aída Cuevas	Rodrigo Cuevas

== Movies ==
- (1981) Te Solté la Rienda
- (1983) No Vale Nada la Vida
- (1989) La Gallera
- (1989) Pero Sigo Siendo el Rey
- (1990) El Tigre del Norte

== Awards ==
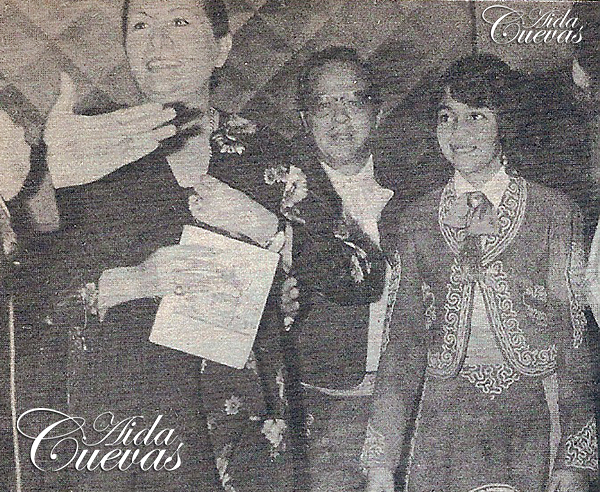
Aida Cuevas and Lola Beltrán 1976

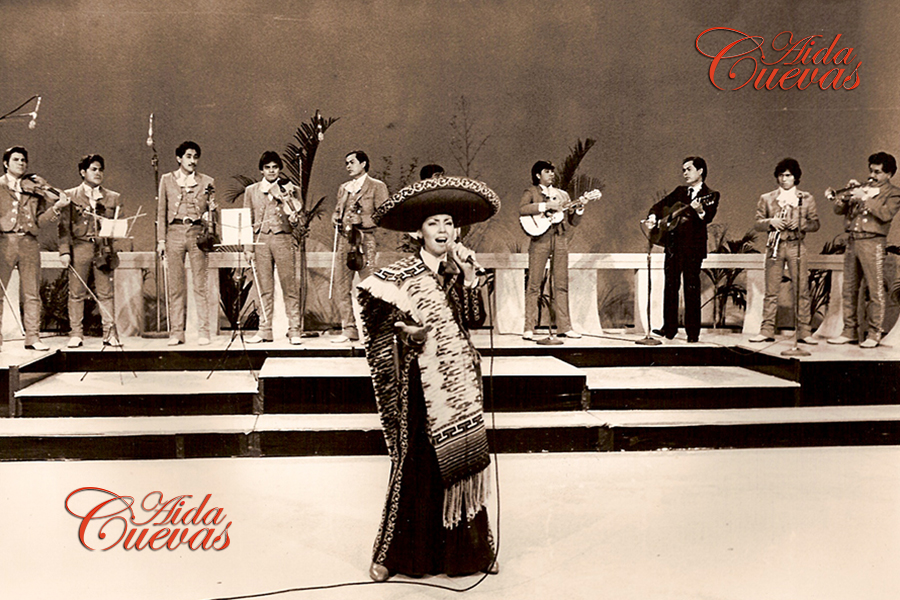
Aida Cuevas circa 1980

Year	Award
1977	Trophy Cenanchero (Málaga, Spain)
1978	Queen of the Taxi Drivers of Mexico City
1978	Ranchera Revelation of the National Newspaper Union
1979	First Mexican Artist to inaugurate an American television broadcasting station Channel 56
1980	Feminine Revelation of the II Ranchero Festival
1980	Queen of the Asociación of Charros of Los Ángeles
1980	Folkloric Revelation of the El Heraldo Newspaper
1981	Folkloric Revelation of the El Heraldo Newspaper
1981	Queen of the Billeteros of México
198?	Folkloric Majesty (Prensa Nacional)
1985	Received keys of the City of Stockton by Mayor Parkinson
1986	Ambassador of the friendship of México - Norteamérica
1990	Best interpreter of the OTI Festival
1992	Queen of the Shoemakers of San Mateo Atenco
1995	Queen of Mariachi (1st time)
1996	Silver Star award of the best voice in Mexico
1997	Jalisco Award of the Charreria, best voice and best mariachi dressed.
1998	Queen of the Mariachis
2002	Mr. Amigo
2002	Latin Grammy nominee, Best Ranchero album (Enhorabuena)
2005	Queen of the Mariachis (2nd time)
2007	Queen of the Mariachis (3rd time)
2010	Latin Grammy Award, Best Tango album (De Corazón a Corazón... Mariachi Tango)
2013	Latin Grammy nominee, Best Ranchero album (Totalmente Juan Gabriel, Vol. 1)
2015	Latin Grammy nominee, Best Ranchero album (Pa' Que Sientas Lo Que Siento)
2017	Grammy winner, Best Regional Mexican album (including tejano) (Arrieros Somos)
2018	Grammy nominee, Best Regional Mexican album (including tejano) (Totalmente Juan Gabriel, Vol. 2)
2019	Queen of the Mariachis (4th time)
