= Lila Deneken =

- Born: Lila Pura Deneken Cacharro; 14 May 1949 (age 76)
- Origin: Mexico City, Mexico
- Genres: Latin pop, bolero, bossa nova, jazz
- Occupation: Singer

Lila Deneken whose birth name is Lila Pura Deneken Cacharro is a Mexican singer, songwriter, entertainer, painter and entrepreneur. Because of her emotional singing style and voice, she is considered to be the number one female singer and entertainer in Mexico; thus, earning her the name of "La Numero Uno" (the number one).

== Early life and career ==
Born in Mexico City, she was raised with her two sisters, Gilda and Guadalupe (Lupita). Her singing career began in 1966 as part of the group called "Los Peg", whose other members included José José (bass player) and her sister Gilda Deneken (vocalist). Los Peg were known for interpreting Jazz and Bossa Nova music styles. These styles would become her trademark in music. After incorporating other music genres, such as Soul, Music Rock, Ballads, she embarked on her first international tour along with her sister Gilda. Touring under the name "Las Deneken" the 3-month tour turned into a full year due to their great success. Upon her return to Mexico, in 1972 she joined the musical group "Tabasco" with her other sister Lupita Deneken and for the first time the three sisters sang together.

"Tabasco" was discovered by Tony De Marco who became the group's manager. Tabasco's first tour was across the United States of America. Due to the group's success, the U.S. tour was extended for several years. It was during this time that Lila decided to separate from the group to become a solo artist.

== Career as a solo artist ==
In 1978, she competed in the Mexican national selection for the OTI Festival placing second with the song "Cuando pienso en ti" written by Nacho Méndez and winning the Best Performer Award and Breakout Artist Award. In 1980, she entered again in the Mexican national selection for the OTI Festival, placing second with the song "Se solicita una aventura" written by Roberto Cantoral. Lila is well known for her fashion sense, this time she wore a spectacular gown designed by Bob Mackie. Her performance, her presentation, her personality, and her voice garnered her once more the Breakout Artist Award.

Later, Lila gained fame for a song written by Bebu Silvetti and Lolita de la Colina, entitled "Por Cobardia" (Because I'm a Coward); "Por Cobardia" put her on the top of every playlist.

In 1981 she embarked on a second International tour as a solo artist. She became the first and only female Latin artist to perform in the world recognized "Sporting Club" of Monaco in Monte-Carlo. Upon her return to Mexico she continued to perform in sold-out concerts with her Las Vegas style shows.

Lila has appeared with many Mexican entertainers such as Gualberto Castro.

== Personal life ==
Married to the Televisa producer Humberto Navarro La Carabina de Ambrosio (later divorced), she had two children with Navarro, Lila decided to focus on her family. She left entertaining and began painting and writing musicals, plays and short stories.

== Return to show business ==
In 2001, she returned to performing with 4 concerts in the "Foro Cultural Coyoacanense Hugo Arguelles", where she debuted a newer style as music along with her standards.

In October 2001 she successfully four-walled the "Ramiro Jimenez" theater in Mexico City.

In 2002 she was named "Madrina de Honor" in the "Festival del Dia Mundial del Mariachi".
