= Prisma (singer) =

Mexican singer (born 1948)

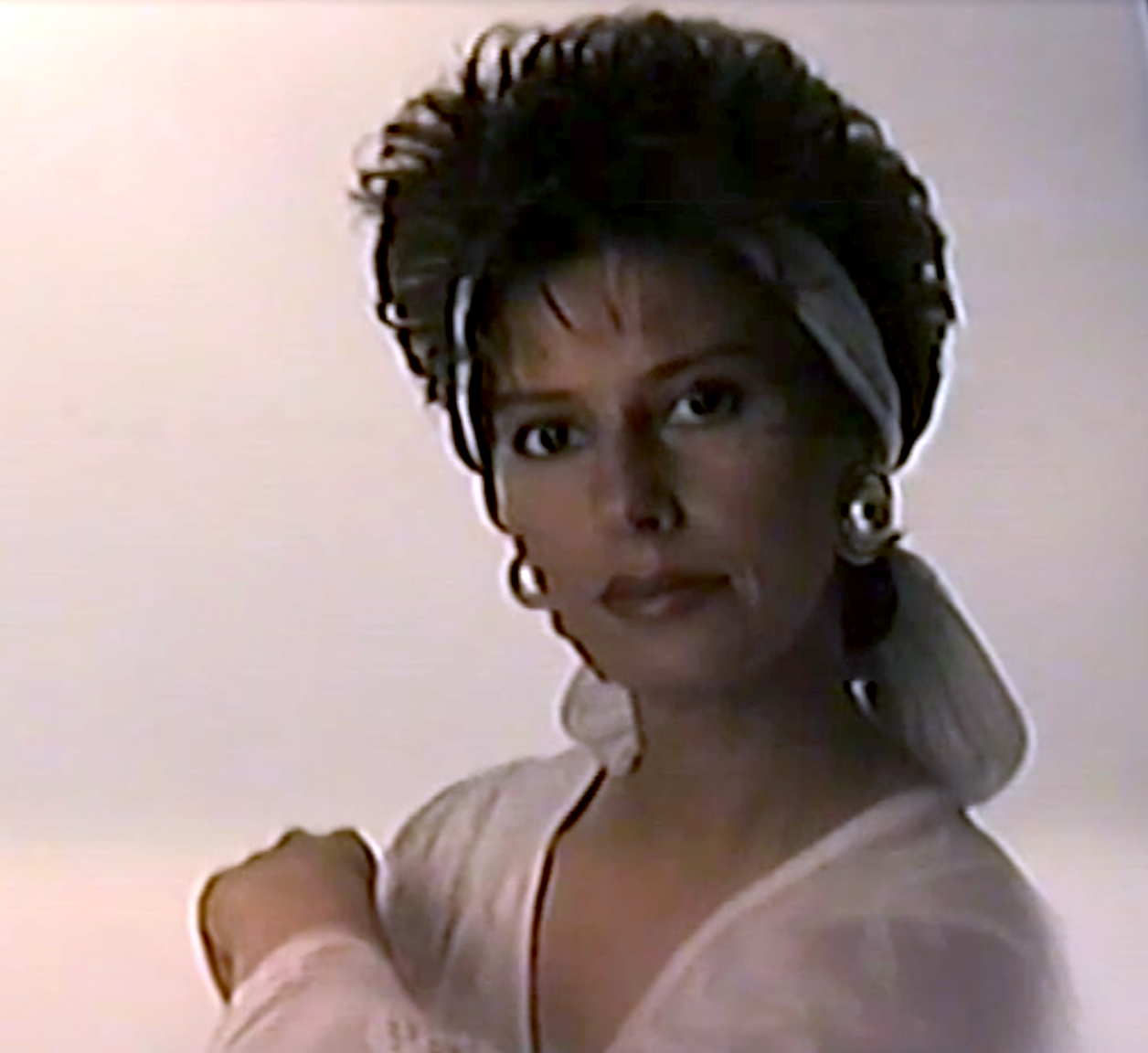
- Prisma in the 1980s

Background information
- Also known as: Sylvia Tapia
- Born: Silvia Tapia Alcázar; 8 November 1948 (age 77); Mexico City, Mexico
- Genre: Latin pop
- Occupations: Singer; songwriter
- Years active: 1966–1990s
- Label: Peerless Records
- Formerly of: Trío Juventud; Realízate

Silvia Tapia Alcázar (born 8 November 1948), better known by her stage name Prisma and also known as Sylvia Tapia, is a Mexican singer, songwriter, and music teacher. She developed her artistic career mainly during the 1980s and 1990s. She represented Mexico in the OTI Festival 1986, placing second with the song "De color de rosa".

In addition to her career as a performer and songwriter, she has developed activities and projects related to music education and children's reading. In 1993, she received the Children's Theatre Award of the Instituto Nacional de Bellas Artes y Literatura for her work Leer es mágico.

== Background ==
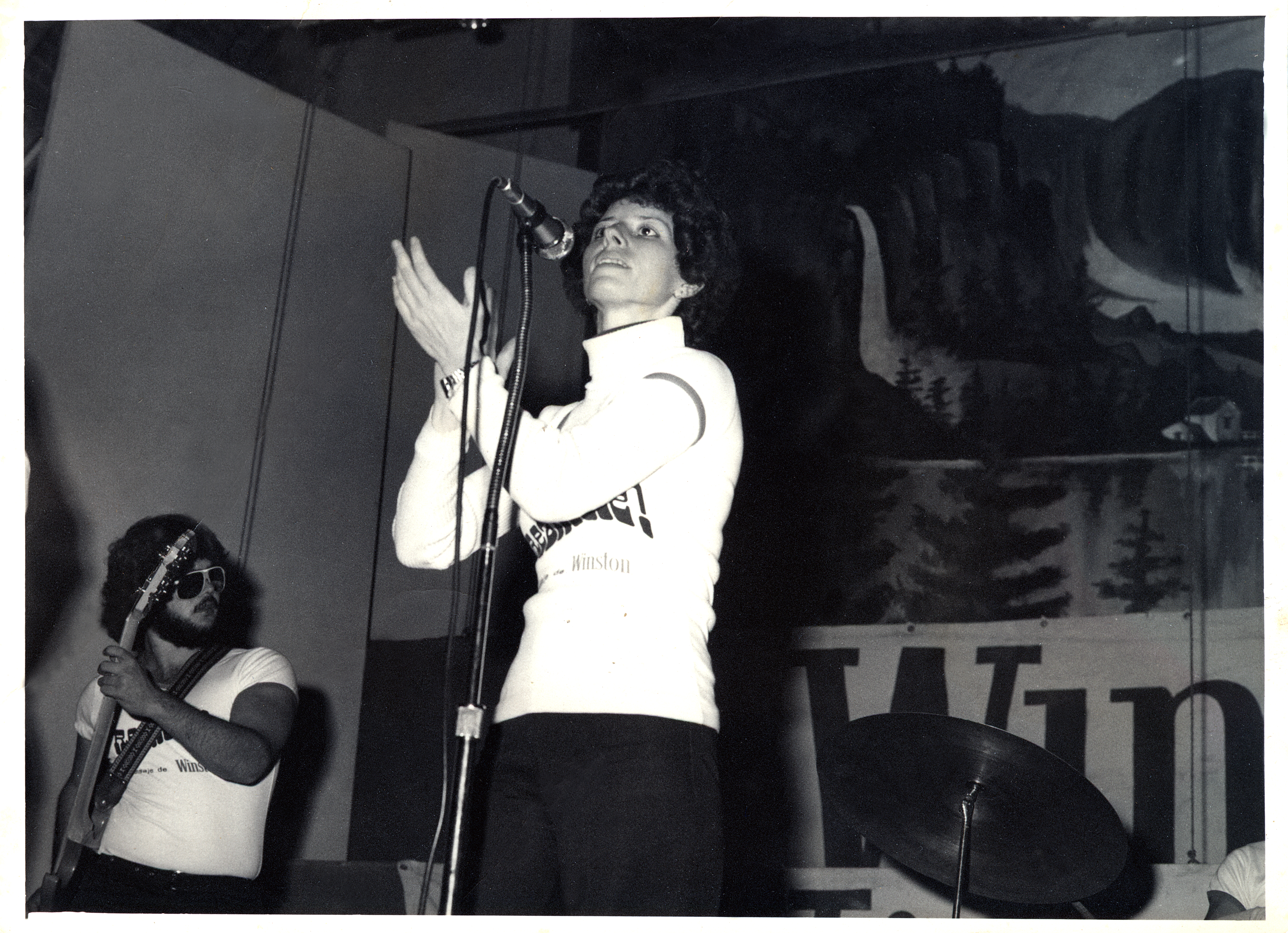
Tapia in 1977

Silvia Tapia is the daughter of Spanish musician and educator Simón Tapia Colman and Mexican teacher, historian, and educator Esperanza Alcázar Montenegro. In 1966, she began composing and singing jingles for television and radio commercials. In 1969, she created the musical group Trío Juventud, and in 1977, the musical group Realízate. On 16 August 1980, she made her solo debut under the name Prisma.

== Discography ==
=== Albums ===
- Quiéreme otra vez (1980)
- Esas cosas del amor (1981)
- Venganza de amor (1982)
- Con las alas rotas (1983)
- Se me cansó el corazón (1984)
- Tómalo, tómalo (1985)
- Desde la intimidad (1986)
- Prohibido (1987)

== Works ==
In addition to her career as a performer and songwriter, she has developed activities and projects related to music education and children's reading, publishing several works.

- Leer es mágico: musical theatre work for children.
- Sistema solar musical: didactic method for teaching piano to children.
- La ola musical: An early stimulation program consisting of 121 children's songs, designed as a tool for cognitive and musical development.

In 1993, Leer es mágico received the Children's Theatre Award of the Instituto Nacional de Bellas Artes y Literatura.

== At the OTI Festival ==
Tapia participated twelve times in the Mexican national selection for the OTI Festival both as a singer and a songwriter; winning the 15th edition with her song "De color de rosa", and thus representing Mexico in the OTI Festival 1986, where she placed second.

Participations in the Mexican national selection for the OTI festival
Year	Song	Performer	Songwriter	Result
1980	"Tarde"	Prisma	Sylvia Tapia	Eliminated in the qualifying rounds
1981	"Silencio"	Prisma	Sylvia Tapia	Eliminated in the qualifying rounds
1981	"Madre"	Alondra	Sylvia Tapia	Eliminated in the qualifying rounds
1982	"Y hablando de nostalgia"	Prisma	Candelario Macedo	Eliminated in the qualifying rounds
1984	"Se me cansó el corazón"	Prisma	Sylvia Tapia	4th in the final
1985	"El amor es amor"	Prisma	Sylvia Tapia	Eliminated in the first semi-final
1985	"Te quiero para mí"	Morenita	Sylvia Tapia	Eliminated in the first qualifying round
1986	"De color de rosa"	Prisma	Sylvia Tapia	1st in the final
1986	"¡Ay, quiéreme!"	Jaime Santini	Sylvia Tapia	Eliminated in the third qualifying round
1987	"Hazlo todo tú"	Hernán Visetti	Sylvia Tapia	Eliminated in the first qualifying round
1988	"Seré, será"	Prisma	Sylvia Tapia	Eliminated in the fourth qualifying round
1988	"Borrón y cuenta nueva"	Rosenda Bernal	Sylvia Tapia	Eliminated in the second qualifying round

Participations in the OTI festival
Year	Country	Song	Performer	Songwriter	Result
1986	Mexico	"De color de rosa"	Prisma	Sylvia Tapia	2nd
