= Mexico in the OTI Festival 1985 =

- OTI Festival 1985
- Participating broadcaster: Televisa
- Country: Mexico
- Selection process: National OTI Festival
- Selection date: 1 September 1985

Competing entry
- Song: "El fandango aquí"
- Artist: Eugenia León
- Songwriter: Marcial Alejandro

Placement
- Final result: 1st

Participation chronology
| ◄1984 • | 1985 | • 1986► |

Mexico was represented at the OTI Festival 1985 with the song "El fandango aquí", written by Marcial Alejandro, and performed by Eugenia León. The Mexican participating broadcaster, Televisa, selected its entry through a national televised competition with several phases. The song, that was performed in position 8, placed first out of 21 competing entries, winning the festival. This was the third entry from Mexico that won the OTI Festival, after winning in 1973 and in 1975.

== National stage ==
Televisa held a national competition with four televised qualifying rounds, a playoff, two semi-finals, and a final to select its entry for the 14th edition of the OTI Festival. This fourteenth edition of the National OTI Festival featured twenty-eight songs in the qualifying rounds, twelve in the semi-finals, and six in the final. In addition to the general competition, awards were given for Best Male Performer, Best Female Performer, Best Musical Arrangement, Breakout Male Artist, and Breakout Female Artist among all the competing artists.

The qualifying rounds were held at Studio 2 of Televisa San Ángel, while the semi-finals and the final were held at the National Auditorium in Mexico City, all presented by Raúl Velasco, and broadcast on Canal 2. The musical director was Chucho Ferrrer, who conducted the orchestra when required.

Competing entries on the National OTI Festival – Mexico 1985
| Song | Artist | Songwriter(s) | Conductor |
|---|---|---|---|
| "A tu merced" | Gil Rivera | Gil Rivera | Jesús Medel |
| "Blue demon blues" | Jaime López | Jaime López | Eduardo Magallanes |
| "Búscame" | Ana Gabriel | Ana Gabriel; Tony Flores | Chucho Ferrer |
| "De aquí a la luna" | Jorge Muñiz | Jorge Muñiz | Luigi Lazareno |
| "El amor es amor" | Prisma | Sylvia Tapia | Julio Jaramillo |
| "El fandango aquí" | Eugenia León | Marcial Alejandro | Eduardo Magallanes |
| "En mi soledad" | Arianna | Marcos Flores | Jesús Medel |
| "Fanático" | Juan Santana | Carlos Lara; Jesús Monárrez | Rubén Zepeda |
| "Guitarra" | Sandra Lhor | Guadalupe Trigo; Mario Arturo | Gustavo A. Santiago |
| "La única mujer sobre la tierra" | José Alberto Fuentes | Sergio Andrade | Sergio Andrade |
| "Mágico" | María del Sol | Carlos Lara | Ricardo Toral |
| "Me haces falta" | Liliana | Jorge Javier Martínez | Chucho Ferrer |
| "Mi opinión" | Beatriz Adriana | Marco Antonio Solís | Rubén Zepeda |
| "Muñeco de papel" | Alondra | Sonia Rivas | Jorge René González |
| "Navegaré" | Mario Pintor | Mario Pintor | Julio Jaramillo |
| "Por falta de ternura" | Julián | Loro | Jesús Medel |
| "Porque te quiero" | Fernando Riba | Juan Salvador | Ricardo Toral |
| "Qué razón tenías" | Manuel Ascanio | Juan Ramón Ibarra | Salomón Jiménez |
| "Quiero abandonarme" | Ricky Luis | Ricky Luis | David Rojas |
| "Quisiera" | Sergio Andrade | Sergio Andrade | |
| "Sangre, sol y barro" | José Roberto | José Roberto | Chucho Ferrer |
| "Sobreviviré" | María María | Nora Betancourt | Luigi Lazareno |
| "Soy el rock and roll" | Vitorino | Vitorino | Luigi Lazareno |
| "Te quiero para mí" | Morenita | Sylvia Tapia | Chucho Ferrer |
| "Tú y yo en el tiempo" | Crystal | Rubén Zepeda | Rubén Zepeda |
| "Una mujer" | Mariana Maesse | Mary Reina | Marcos Lizama |
| "¿Y ahora qué hago?" | Roco Damián | Damián Ontiveros | Jesús Medel |
| "Y creo que voy a llorar" | Arturo Vázquez | Arturo Vázquez | Luigi Lazareno |

=== Qualifying rounds ===
The four qualifying rounds were held on Saturdays 3, 10, 17, and 24 August 1985. Each round featured seven entries, of which the two highest-scoring advanced to the semi-finals. In each round, after all the competing entries were performed, each of the eleven jurors cast one vote for each of their two favorite entries.

Qualifier

Result of the first qualifying round of the National OTI Festival – Mexico 1985
| R/O | Song | Artist | Votes | Result |
|---|---|---|---|---|
| 1 | "Fanático" | Juan Santana | 9 | Qualified |
| 2 | "Por falta de ternura" | Julián | 5 | —N/a |
| 3 | "Sobreviviré" | María María | 5 | Qualified |
| 4 | "Una mujer" | Mariana Maesse | 0 | —N/a |
| 5 | "Te quiero para mí" | Morenita | 3 | —N/a |
| 6 | "¿Y ahora qué hago?" | Roco Damián | 0 | —N/a |
| 7 | "Soy el rock and roll" | Vitorino | 0 | —N/a |

Result of the second qualifying round of the National OTI Festival – Mexico 1985
| R/O | Song | Artist | Votes | Result |
|---|---|---|---|---|
| 1 | "Muñeco de papel" | Alondra | 0 | —N/a |
| 2 | "Búscame" | Ana Gabriel | 2 | —N/a |
| 3 | "En mi soledad" | Arianna | 10 | Qualified |
| 4 | "Y creo que voy a llorar" | Arturo Vázquez | 2 | —N/a |
| 5 | "Porque te quiero" | Fernando Riba | 1 | —N/a |
| 6 | "Navegaré" | Mario Pintor | 5 | Qualified |
| 7 | "Quiero abandonarme" | Ricky Luis | 2 | —N/a |

Result of the third qualifying round of the National OTI Festival – Mexico 1985
| R/O | Song | Artist | Votes | Result |
|---|---|---|---|---|
| 1 | "Mi opinión" | Beatriz Adriana | 1 | —N/a |
| 2 | "Tú y yo en el tiempo" | Crystal | 4 | —N/a |
| 3 | "A tu merced" | Gil Rivera | 6 | Qualified |
| 4 | "De aquí a la luna" | Jorge Muñiz | 9 | Qualified |
| 5 | "La única mujer sobre la tierra" | José Alberto Fuentes | 1 | —N/a |
| 6 | "Blue demon blues" | Jaime López | 0 | —N/a |
| 7 | "Guitarra" | Sandra Lhor | 1 | —N/a |

Result of the fourth qualifying round of the National OTI Festival – Mexico 1985
| R/O | Song | Artist | Votes | Result |
|---|---|---|---|---|
| 1 | "El fandango aquí" | Eugenia León | 9 | Qualified |
| 2 | "Sangre, sol y barro" | José Roberto | 2 | —N/a |
| 3 | "Me haces falta" | Liliana | 1 | —N/a |
| 4 | "Qué razón tenías" | Manuel Ascanio | 1 | —N/a |
| 5 | "Mágico" | María del Sol | 2 | —N/a |
| 6 | "El amor es amor" | Prisma | 6 | Qualified |
| 7 | "Quisiera" | Sergio Andrade | 1 | —N/a |

=== Playoff ===
The playoff was held on Saturday 24 August 1985 following the fourth qualifying round. To select the last four semi-finalists, each of the eleven jurors cast one vote for each of their four favorite entries among the twenty not qualified.

Result of the playoff of the National OTI Festival – Mexico 1985
| R/O | Song | Votes | Result |
|---|---|---|---|
| 1 | "Por falta de ternura" | 1 | —N/a |
| 2 | "Una mujer" | 0 | —N/a |
| 3 | "Te quiero para mí" | 0 | —N/a |
| 4 | "¿Y ahora qué hago?" | 0 | —N/a |
| 5 | "Soy el rock and roll" | 1 | —N/a |
| 6 | "Muñeco de papel" | 0 | —N/a |
| 7 | "Búscame" | 4 | Qualified |
| 8 | "Y creo que voy a llorar" | 3 | —N/a |
| 9 | "Porque te quiero" | 1 | —N/a |
| 10 | "Quiero abandonarme" | 0 | —N/a |
| 11 | "Mi opinión" | 3 | —N/a |
| 12 | "Tú y yo en el tiempo" | 11 | Qualified |
| 13 | "La única mujer sobre la tierra" | 4 | Qualified |
| 14 | "Blue demon blues" | 0 | —N/a |
| 15 | "Guitarra" | 2 | —N/a |
| 16 | "Sangre, sol y barro" | 2 | —N/a |
| 17 | "Me haces falta" | 3 | —N/a |
| 18 | "Qué razón tenías" | 3 | —N/a |
| 19 | "Mágico" | 5 | Qualified |
| 20 | "Quisiera" | 0 | —N/a |

=== Semi-finals ===
The semi-finals were held on Friday 30 and Saturday 31 August 1985. The twelve songs that had been qualified were distributed between the two semi-finals. In each semi-final, after all the competing entries were performed, each of the fifteen jurors cast one vote for each of their three favorite entries, and the three most voted songs from each semi-final went on to the final.

Result of the first semi-final of the National OTI Festival – Mexico 1985
| R/O | Song | Artist | Votes | Result |
|---|---|---|---|---|
| 1 | "De aquí a la luna" | Jorge Muñiz | 3 | —N/a |
| 2 | "Navegaré" | Mario Pintor | 8 | Qualified |
| 3 | "El amor es amor" | Prisma | 5 | —N/a |
| 4 | "Sobreviviré" | María María | 6 | —N/a |
| 5 | "Mágico" | María del Sol | 9 | Qualified |
| 6 | "En mi soledad" | Arianna | 14 | Qualified |

Result of the second semi-final of the National OTI Festival – Mexico 1985
| R/O | Song | Artist | Votes | Result |
|---|---|---|---|---|
| 1 | "A tu merced" | Gil Rivera | 4 | —N/a |
| 2 | "La única mujer sobre la tierra" | José Alberto Fuentes | 9 | Qualified |
| 3 | "Tú y yo en el tiempo" | Crystal | 8 | Qualified |
| 4 | "Búscame" | Ana Gabriel | 3 | —N/a |
| 5 | "Fanático" | Juan Santana | 7 | —N/a |
| 6 | "El fandango aquí" | Eugenia León | 14 | Qualified |

=== Final ===
The six-song final was held on Sunday 1 September 1985. The final was held in two rounds. In the first round, each of the fifteen jurors cast one vote for each of their three favorite entries, and the three most voted songs went on to the superfinal. In the superfinal, each juror announced aloud one vote for their favourite entry.

The winner was "El fandango aquí", written by Marcial Alejandro, and performed by Eugenia León. The festival ended with a reprise of the winning entry.

Result of the final of the National OTI Festival – Mexico 1985
| R/O | Song | Artist | Votes | Result |
|---|---|---|---|---|
| 1 | "Tú y yo en el tiempo" | Crystal | 5 | 4 |
| 2 | "La única mujer sobre la tierra" | José Alberto Fuentes | 3 | 6 |
| 3 | "Mágico" | María del Sol | 4 | 5 |
| 4 | "Navegaré" | Mario Pintor | 6 | Qualified |
| 5 | "El fandango aquí" | Eugenia León | 13 | Qualified |
| 6 | "En mi soledad" | Arianna | 14 | Qualified |

Winner

Result of the superfinal of the National OTI Festival – Mexico 1985
| R/O | Song | Artist | Votes | Result |
|---|---|---|---|---|
| 1 | "Navegaré" | Mario Pintor | 0 | 3 |
| 2 | "El fandango aquí" | Eugenia León | 11 | 1 |
| 3 | "En mi soledad" | Arianna | 4 | 2 |

=== Merit awards ===
In the final, the jurors voted for the Best Male and Female Performer, Best Musical Arrangement, and Breakout Male and Female Artist among the three shortlisted artist in each category.

José Alberto Fuentes received the Best Male Performer Award; Arianna the Best Female Performer Award; Eduardo Magallanes the Best Musical Arrangement Award for "El fandango aquí"; Ricky Luis the Breakout Male Artist Award; and Eugenia León the Breakout Female Artist Award.

=== Official album ===
Las 12 finalistas del Festival OTI 85 is the official compilation album of the fourteenth edition of the Mexican National OTI Festival, released by Melody in 1985. The vinyl LP features the studio version of the twelve songs qualified for the semi-finals.

== At the OTI Festival ==
On 21 September 1985, the OTI Festival was held at Teatro Lope de Vega in Seville, Spain, hosted by Televisión Española, and broadcast live throughout Ibero-America. Eugenia León performed "El fandango aquí" in position 8, with Chucho Ferrer conducting the event's orchestra, and placing first of 21 competing entries, winning the festival. This was the third entry from Mexico that won the OTI Festival, after winning in 1973 and in 1975.
