= Mexico in the OTI Festival =

- OTI Festival
- Participating broadcaster: Televisa

Participation summary
- Appearances: 27
- First appearance: 1973
- Last appearance: 2000
- Highest placement: 1st: 1973, 1975, 1985, 1989, 1990, 1997
- Host: 1974, 1976, 1981, 1984, 1991, 2000
- Participation history: ~~1972~~; 1973; 1974; 1975; 1976; 1977; 1978; 1979; 1980; 1981; 1982; 1983; 1984; 1985; 1986; 1987; 1988; 1989; 1990; 1991; 1992; 1993; 1994; 1995; 1996; 1997; 1998; 2000

The participation of Mexico in the OTI Festival began at the second OTI Festival in 1973. The Mexican participating broadcaster was Televisa, which was member of the Organización de Televisión Iberoamericana (OTI). Televisa participated in twenty-seven of the twenty-eight editions, only missing the first edition. It won the festival six times: in 1973, 1975, 1985, 1989, 1990, and 1997; and it hosted the event also six times: 1974, 1976, 1981, 1984, 1991, and 2000.

During the contest's run, Mexico was one of the most successful countries with its six wins, including a back-to-back victory in 1989 and 1990, and fourteen top 3 finishes.

== History ==
Telesistema Mexicano (TSM) had initially registered for the OTI Festival 1972, the first edition of the OTI Festival organized by the Organización de Televisión Iberoamericana (OTI), and had selected through a national final the song "Yo no voy a la guerra", written by Roberto Cantoral, and performed by Alberto Ángel "El Cuervo", as its entry, but the song was disqualified by the OTI Program Commission because its lyrics didn't comply with the rules of the competition for going against "the idiosyncratic sensitivity or way of life of the Ibero-American peoples". The commission asked TSM to submit a replacement song, but the broadcaster refused to do so. So Televisa, TSM's successor, entered the festival for the first time in its second edition the following year.

TSM first, and Televisa later, had a long tradition of organizing large-scale multi-stage televised national competitions to select its entry to the OTI Festival. This "National OTI Festival", was passionately followed every year by the Mexican audience. Many well known singers and songwriters such as Juan Gabriel, Emmanuel, Lucero, Manuel Mijares, Joan Sebastian, Cristian Castro, or the girl band Pandora, participated in the national selections, but didn't win the national final.

Mexico and Spain were the most successful countries of the history of the festival, with six victories each. The first Mexican victory came in its first participation, in 1973, with "Qué alegre va María" performed by Imelda Miller. Two year later, in 1975, it won with "La felicidad" performed by Gualberto Castro. One decade later, in 1985, it won with the song "El fandango aquí" performed by Eugenia León. This was a very controversial victory, which was attributed to the solidarity with the country because of the 1985 Mexico City earthquake, that destroyed the capital city. In 1989 and 1990, Mexico got two consecutive wins with "Una canción no es suficiente" performed by Analí and "Un bolero" performed by Carlos Cuevas. Its last victory came in 1997 with the song "Se diga lo que se diga" performed by Iridián.

Televisa hosted the OTI festival six times, in 1974 and 1976 at the Ruiz de Alarcón Theatre in Acapulco. In 1981 and 1984 in Mexico City, being the National Auditorium the venue. In 1991, it hosted again the festival at the Convention Centre in Acapulco, the same venue where it hosted the last edition of the festival in 2000. Televisa was also going to host the contest in 1999 in Veracruz, but it had to be suspended due to the severe flooding that occurred in the country, which devastated the city.

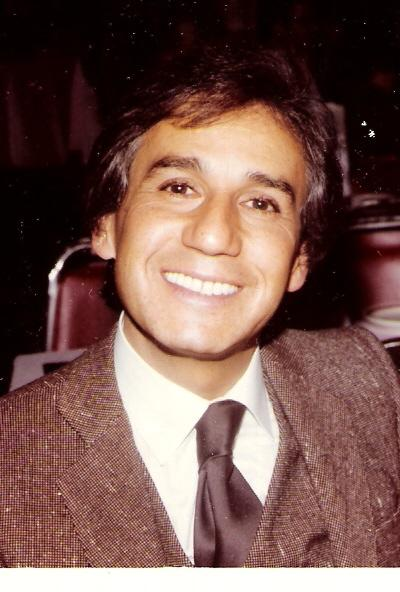
Gualberto Castro won in 1975

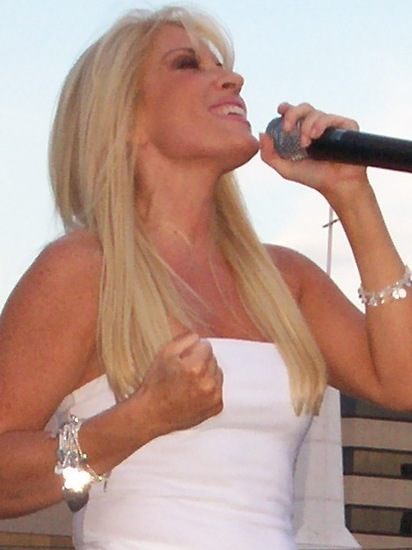
Yuri got third place in 1984

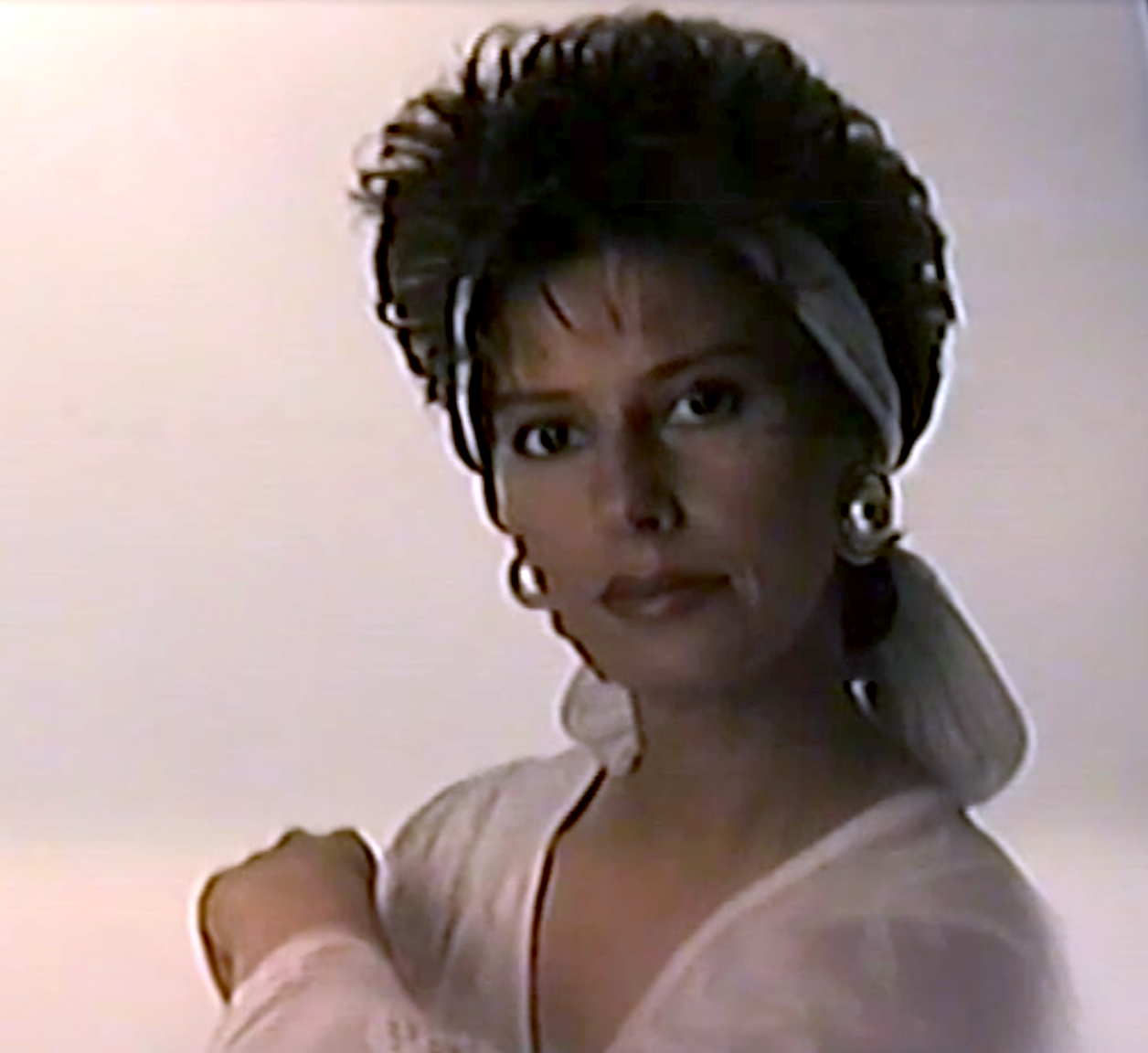
Prisma got second place in 1986

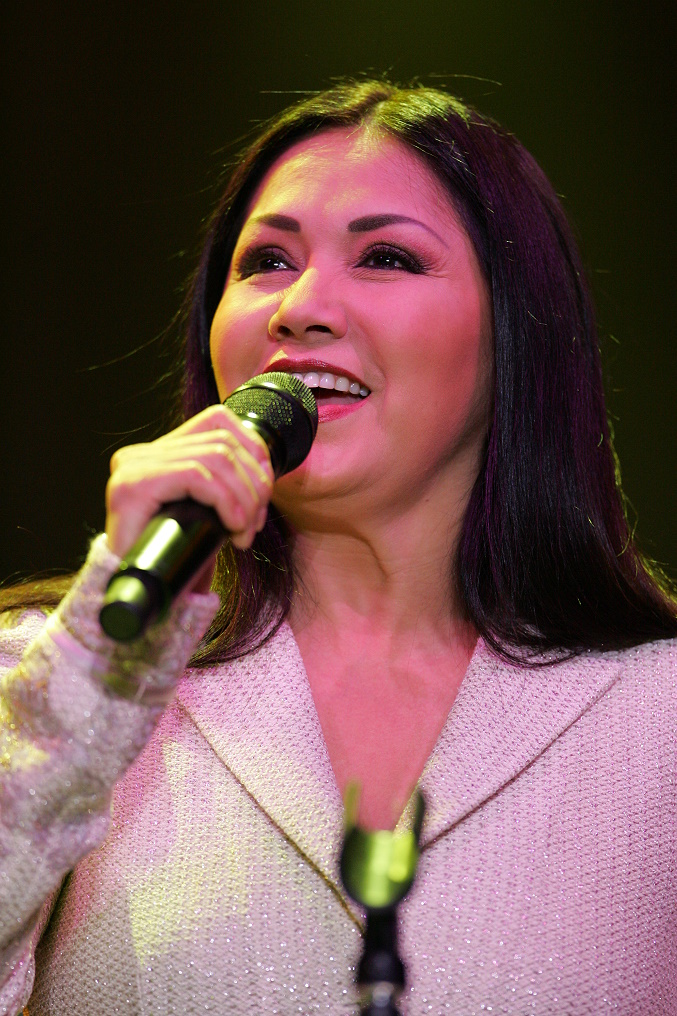
Ana Gabriel got third place in 1987

== Participation overview ==
Table key
1	First place
2	Second place
3	Third place
F	Finalist
◇	Song disqualified / Contest cancelled

Year	Song	Artist	Songwriter(s)	Conductor	Place	Points
1972	"Yo no voy a la guerra" ◇	Alberto Ángel "El Cuervo" ◇	Roberto Cantoral ◇	Disqualified		
1973	"Qué alegre va María"	Imelda Miller	Celia Bonfil	Chucho Ferrer	1	10
1974	"Quijote"	Enrique Cáceres	Roberto Cantoral	Ramón Flores	10	3
1975	"La felicidad"	Gualberto Castro	Felipe Gil	Chucho Ferrer	1	20
1976	"De que te quiero, te quiero"	Gilberto Valenzuela	Rubén Fuentes; Eduardo Magallanes; Mario Molina Montes		6	8
1977	"Hombre"	José María Napoleón	José María Napoleón	Jonathán Zarzosa	17	0
1978	"Como tú"	Lupita D'Alessio	Lolita de la Colina	Chucho Ferrer	3	44
1979	"Vivir sin ti"	Estela Núñez	Roberto Robles; Eduardo Magallanes	Eduardo Magallanes	8	18
1980	"Sólo te amo a ti"	José Roberto	José Roberto	Javier Macías	8	21
1981	"Lo que pasó, pasó"	Yoshio	Felipe Gil		3	22
1982	"Con y por amor"	Enrique Guzmán	Mario Molina Montes; Chamín Correa	Julio Jaramillo	4	22
1983	"Compás de espera"	María Medina	Amparo Rubín	Chucho Ferrer	—N/a	
1984	"Tiempos mejores"	Yuri	Sergio Andrade	Sergio Andrade	3	—N/a
1985	"El fandango aquí"	Eugenia León	Marcial Alejandro	Chucho Ferrer	1	—N/a
1986	"De color de rosa"	Prisma	Sylvia Tapia	Julio Jaramillo	2	—N/a
1987	"¡Ay, Amor!"	Ana Gabriel	Ana Gabriel	Chucho Ferrer	3	—N/a
1988	"Contigo y con el mundo"	María del Sol	Miguel Alfonso Luna; José María Frías	Jesús Medel	5	14
1989	"Una canción no es suficiente"	Analí	Jesús Monárrez		1	—N/a
1990	"Un bolero"	Carlos Cuevas	Francisco Curiel; Pedro Alberto Cárdenas	Pedro Alberto Cárdenas	1	—N/a
1991	"Barrio viejo"	Rodolfo Muñiz	Sergio Esquivel	Chucho Ferrer	3	—N/a
1992	"Enamorado de la vida"	Arturo Vargas	José Luis Almada; Jorge Massías		—N/a	
1993	"Siempre a medias"	Magdalena Zárate	José Manuel Fernández Espinosa	Alberto Núñez Palacios	2	—N/a
1994	"Rompe el cristal"	Fuga de Goya	José María Frías; Carlos Muñoz		5	—N/a
1995	"Cantos distintos"	Sayeg	Sayeg	Alberto Núñez Palacios	—N/a	
1996	"Del piso a la nube"	Sergio Arzate	Fernando Riva; Kiko Campos		—N/a	
1997	"Se diga lo que se diga"	Iridián	Francisco Curiel; José Manuel Fernández	Pedro Alberto Cárdenas	1	—N/a
1998	"Voy a volverme loco"	Fernando Ibarra	Gerardo Flores	Alejandro Hernández	F	—N/a
1999	Contest cancelled ◇					
2000	"Mi vida"	Natalia Sosa	Gerardo Flores		3	—N/a

== Hosting ==
Year	City	Venue	Hosts	Ref.
1974	Acapulco	Ruiz de Alarcón Theatre	Raúl Velasco; Lolita Ayala	
1976	Acapulco	Ruiz de Alarcón Theatre	Raúl Velasco; Susana Dosamantes	
1981	Mexico City	Auditorio Nacional	Raúl Velasco	
1984	Mexico City	Auditorio Nacional	Raúl Velasco	
1991	Acapulco	Centro de Convenciones	Raúl Velasco	
1999	Veracruz	Contest cancelled ◇		
2000	Acapulco	Centro de Convenciones	Emmanuel; Andrea Legarreta; Gabriela Spanic; Otto Sirgo	
