= Lourdes Guerrero =

Mexican actor and news anchor (1938–1997)

- Born: 7 September 1938; Mexico City, Mexico
- Died: 10 February 1997 (aged 58); Mexico City
- Occupation(s): Actress and news anchor

María Concepción de Lourdes Amparan-Águila (7 September 1938 – 10 February 1997, in Mexico City), better known as Lourdes Guerrero was a Mexican actress and news anchor. She is best remembered for hosting the morning news program Hoy Mismo on September 19, 1985, alongside María Victoria Llamas and Juan Dosal when an 8.3 magnitude earthquake struck.

She also appeared in three films:

- Amelia (1964)
- Mariana (1967)
- Narda o el verano (1970)

She died in 1997 of lung cancer.
