= Crystal (singer) =

Mexican former Paralympic athlete and singer

Personal information
- Full name: Gaudelia Díaz Romero
- Born: 1964 (age 61–62) Acapulco, Guerrero
- Occupations: Singer; actress; paralympic athlete
- Years active: 1972–present
- Spouse: Miguel Ángel Huerta (divorced)
- Musical career
- Genre: Latin pop
- Instruments: Vocals; piano
- Label: Musart-Balboa

Sport
- Sport: Athletics
- Disability: Blindness
- Disability class: B1
- Event: Paralympic athletics
Medal record
Paralympic athletics
Representing Mexico
Paralympic Games
Bronze medal – third place	1992 Barcelona	3000 metres – B1

Gaudelia Díaz Romero (born in 1964), best known by her stage name Crystal, is a Mexican singer and retired athlete.

Born blind, she competed on distance events as a Paralympic athlete in the B1 category. As an entertainer, she worked as a singer, pianist, and actress who performed under the pseudonym Crystal since the 1980s. Among her hits are "Suavemente" and "No Me Pregunten por Él".

In the 1990s, Crystal was part of the Mexican team that traveled to Barcelona, Spain, for the 1992 Summer Paralympics, where she competed in the 3000 meters event and won a bronze medal. She also participed in the 800m and 1500m events, finishing fourth in both competitions.

== Early life and musical career ==
Gaudelia Díaz Romero was born in Acapulco, Guerrero, in 1964. Díaz was born blind into a poor family, and was harassed by her brothers as she was growing up. She learned to play the piano by ear. She began practicing various sports as a child, including skating, soccer, and gymnastics, but gave up the latter because it required seeing the parallel bars. Instead, a friend invited her to go running, and she became interested in long-distance running.

Around 1981, Díaz met Sergio Andrade, a Mexican record producer, and both composed "Suavemente", a song that entered the 11th Mexican national selection for the OTI Festival and made it to the national finals. Díaz adopted the stage name Crystal, and she started dating Andrade, becoming her manager as well. After this, their relationship became violent, as Andrade constantly threatened to physically attack her. According to an interview given to Mara Patricia Castañeda, Crystal said that Andrade psychologically humiliated her when she made mistakes in her singing or piano playing, including one occasion at the World Popular Song Festival in Japan, where he threatened to break her arm to justify why she could not play the piano on that occasion.

Their relationship lasted three years, until she realized that she was not living in a normal situation. Mexican singer Juan Gabriel helped her leave Andrade after asking him for advice. Crystal attended a concert by Juan Gabriel, during which he sang a song for her. According to her, he was upset and believed she was seeking to make Juan Gabriel to become her new producer. Because of that, Andrade did not let her perform the song "Tiempos Mejores", a song about a blind person expecting better times, at the 13th Mexican national selection for the OTI Festival, which ultimately ended up being sung by Yuri, winning the national final, and representing Mexico in the OTI Festival 1984, where she placed third.

== Sports career ==
Crystal participated in the 1991 Parapan American Games, held in Puerto Rico—which at the time the games had no official recognition—where she won gold in the 400, 800, and 1500 meters events. The next year, she competed in the 1992 Summer Paralympics in Barcelona, in the 800, 1500, and 3000 meters events. She finished third in the latter event and fourth in the others, earning a bronze medal. She ended her athletics career due to a lack of support.

== Post-Paralympics and personal life ==
After her return from Barcelona, Emilio Azcárraga Milmo, then CEO of Televisa, asked her to join the company's artistic staff. She acted in the telenovela Lazos de Amor. She later met Miguel Ángel Huerta, whom she married. Both were in charge of the Sports Federation for the Blind and Visually Impaired. Huerta is also visually impaired but to a lesser degree, and he was director of the Mexican Paralympic Committee. As of 2021, Crystal stated that she was single and living in Acapulco, where she assists visually impaired children with musical education.

== Discography ==
Adapted from AllMusic and iTunes.

- Suavemente (1982)
- Eso No Se Hace (1983)
- Acaríciame el Alma (1985)
- Noche Mágica (1986)
- Mis Secretos (2001)
- Las Canciones de Mi Vida (2002)
- Sentimientos de México (2003)
- Homenaje a Juan Gabriel (2008)
- De una Vez por Todas (2011)

== Filmography ==
- De qué color es el viento (1972) – Eva Helguera
- Cuando los hijos se van (1983) – Claudia
- Lazos de Amor (1995) – Soledad Jiménez
- Desde Gayola (2002–2013) – Mirosnada
