= Francisco Xavier Berganza =

Mexican politician

- Born: 19 March 1967 (age 59); Apan, Hidalgo, Mexico
- Occupations: Deputy and Senator
- Political party: PANAL

Francisco Xavier Berganza Escorza (born 19 March 1967) is a Mexican politician affiliated with the PANAL. As of 2013 he served as Senator of the LX and LXI Legislatures of the Mexican Congress representing Hidalgo. He also served as Deputy during the LVII Legislature.
