= Sergio Andrade =

Mexican musician (born 1955)

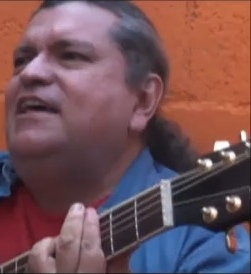

Background information
- Born: Sergio Gustavo Andrade Sánchez; 26 November 1955 (age 70); Coatzacoalcos, Veracruz
- Occupations: Singer-songwriter, record producer
- Years active: 1979–present
- Spouse: María Raquenel Portillo Jiménez (m. 1984; div. 1990)

Sergio Gustavo Andrade Sánchez (born 26 November 1955), best known as Sergio Andrade, is a Mexican singer-songwriter and record producer. In the 1980s and 1990s, he wrote songs and produced albums for Yuri, Lucero, Crystal, Joan Sebastian and Gloria Trevi, among others, some of which became hits in Latin America.

Following an Interpol red notice, in 2000, Andrade, his former wife Mary Boquitas, and Trevi were arrested in Brazil on charges of statutory rape, and they were dubbed by the media the Trevi–Andrade Clan. Boquitas and Trevi were later cleared of the charges. Andrade was sentenced to 7 years and 10 months in prison, being released in 2007.
