= Jorge Muñiz =

- Birth name: Jorge Muñiz Garner
- Also known as: "Coque"
- Born: 1 May 1960 (age 65); Mexico City, Mexico
- Genres: romantic ballad, bolero, jazz, vocal
- Occupation(s): Singer, musician, actor, tv host, songwriter, record producer
- Instrument(s): Vocals, guitar, piano
- Years active: 1970–present

Jorge Alberto Muñiz Gardner (born 1 May 1960) is a Mexican actor, comedian, singer and host. He is better known by his nickname "Coque".

== Biography ==
"Coque" was born in Mexico City to parents Marco Antonio Muñiz ("Mexico's Favorite Singer / Showman") and Olga Gardner Meza. When he was only ten years old, he sung in the choruses of Armando Manzanero. His professional singing career began while he was still an adolescent.

== Discography ==
- Serenata
- Serenata 2: Desvelo De Amor
- Serenata 3: Confidencias De Amor
- Las Canciones Que Mi Papa No Me Enseño
- Emociones
- Noche De Rondalla

== Filmography ==
- Alegrías de Mediodía (1978–)... Conductor
- Al Fin de Semana (1999–)... Conductor
- Nuestra Casa (2003–2006)... Conductor
- La escuelita VIP (2004–)... Coque
- Cantando por un sueño (2006–)... Participante
- Yo amo a Juan Querendón (2007–)
- ¡Pedro Infante Vive! (2007)... Conductor
- El Suertudo 2007... Conductor
- TV de Noche (2007–)... Conductor
- 100 Mexicanos Dijieron (2009)... Celebridad Invitado
- Una familia con suerte (2011)... Psicólogo (Episodios 1 y 2)
- Adictos (2012)... (Adicto a las Gordas)
- Libre para amarte (2013)... Benjamín Hernández Alpuche
