= Catholic Monarchs of Spain =

Title for Isabella I and Ferdinand II

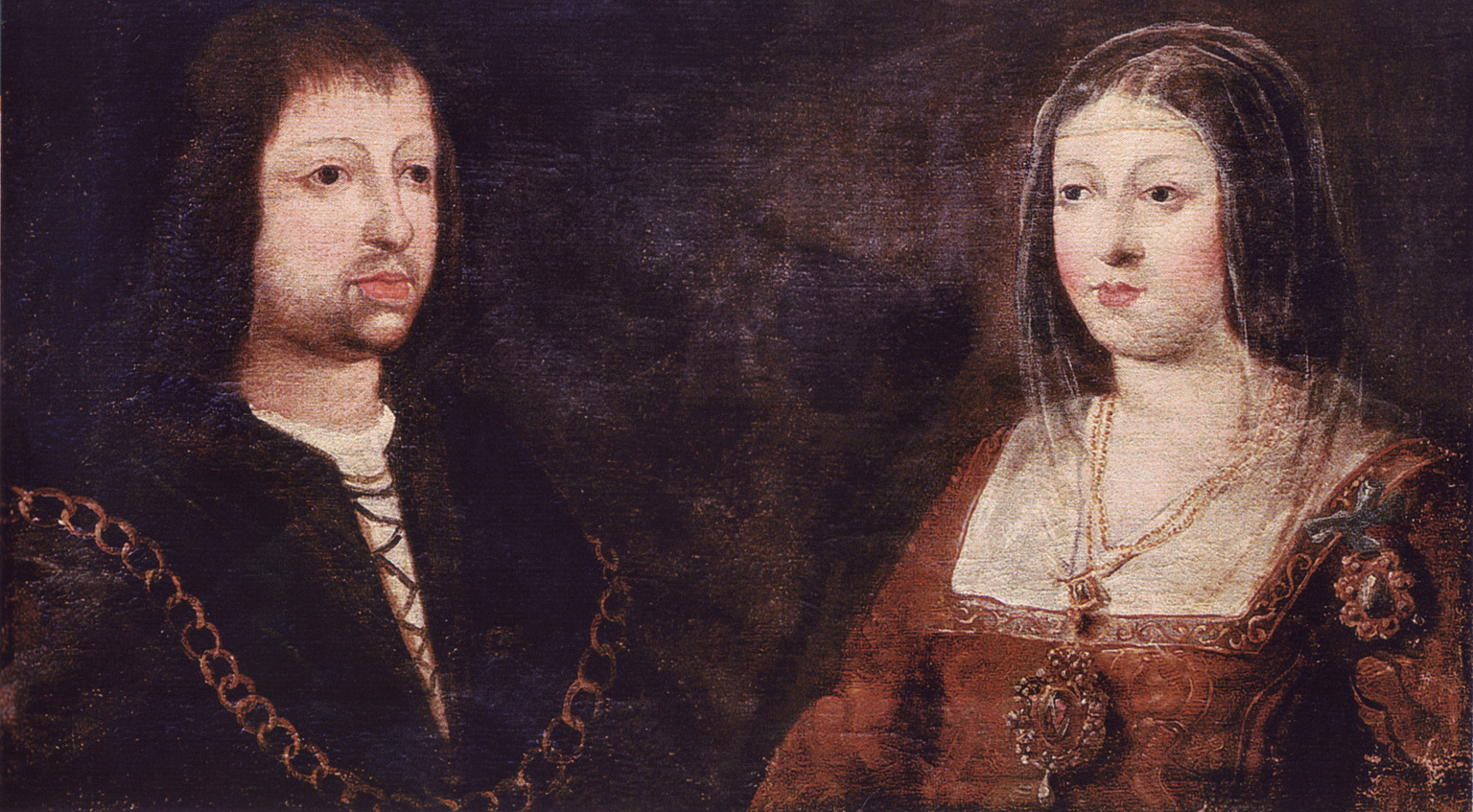
Wedding portrait of Queen Isabella I of Castile (right) and King Ferdinand II of Aragon (left), married in 1469

The Catholic Monarchs (Note: In their native languages: Medieval Castilian: Rey(e)s Catholicos; Modern Castilian: Reyes Católicos; Medieval Catalan and Aragonese: Reys Catholichs; Modern Aragonese: Reis Catolicos; Modern Catalan: Reis Catòlics; Latin: Reges Catholici) (Note: Reyes Católicos, Reis Catòlics or Reis Catolicos is literally "Catholic Kings" rather than "Monarchs", and is sometimes incorrectly so rendered in English; but in Castilian (Spanish), Aragonese and Catalan it is usual for the masculine plural to be used in a gender-indifferent way, so, for example one would call the children of a person or couple hijos, fills or fillos, literally sons, regardless of actual gender, while in English "sons", and "kings", are exclusively masculine.) were Queen Isabella I of Castile (r. 1474–1504) and King Ferdinand II of Aragon (r. 1479–1516), whose marriage and joint rule marked the de facto unification of Spain. They were both from the House of Trastámara and were second cousins, as they were both descended from John I of Castile. To remove the obstacle that this consanguinity would otherwise have posed to their marriage under canon law, they were given a papal dispensation by Sixtus IV. They married on October 19, 1469, in the city of Valladolid; Isabella was 18 years old and Ferdinand a year younger. Their reign was called by William H. Prescott "the most glorious epoch in the annals of Spain".

Spain was formed as a dynastic union of two crowns rather than a unitary state, as Castile and Aragon remained separate kingdoms until the Nueva Planta decrees of 1707–1716. The court of Ferdinand and Isabella was constantly on the move in order to bolster local support for the crown from local feudal lords. The title of "Reyes Católicos", usually translated as "Catholic King and Queen", was officially bestowed on Ferdinand and Isabella by Pope Alexander VI in 1494, in recognition of their defence of the Catholic faith within their realms.

== Marriage ==
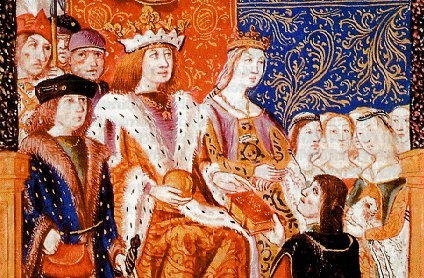
Ferdinand and Isabella with their subjects

At the time of their marriage on October 19, 1469, Isabella was eighteen years old and the heiress presumptive to the Crown of Castile, while Ferdinand was seventeen and heir apparent to the Crown of Aragon. They met for the first time in Valladolid in 1469 and married within a week. From the start, they had a close relationship and worked well together. Both knew that the crown of Castile was "the prize, and that they were both jointly gambling for it." However, it was a step toward the unification of the lands on the Iberian Peninsula, which would eventually become Spain.

Because they were second cousins, they needed a papal dispensation to marry. Pope Paul II, an Italian pope opposed to Aragon's influence on the Mediterranean and to the rise of monarchies strong enough to challenge the Pope, refused to grant one, so they falsified a papal bull of their own. Although the bull is known to be false, it is uncertain who the actual author of the falsification was. Sources tend to cite Alfonso Carrillo de Acuña, Archbishop of Toledo, as the person who provided the dispensation, while other scholars point at Antonio Veneris.

Isabella's claims to Castile were not secure because her marriage to Ferdinand enraged her half-brother, Henry IV of Castile, who had withdrawn his support for her to be his heiress presumptive, a status that had been codified in the Treaty of the Bulls of Guisando. Henry instead recognised Joanna la Beltraneja, born during his marriage to Joan of Portugal, but whose paternity was in doubt because Henry was rumoured to be impotent. When Henry died in 1474, Isabella asserted her claim to the throne, which was contested by thirteen-year-old Joanna. Joanna sought the aid of her husband (who was also her uncle), Afonso V of Portugal, to claim the throne. This dispute between rival claimants led to the War of the Castilian Succession from 1475–79. Isabella called on the aid of Aragon, with her husband, the heir apparent, and his father, Juan II of Aragon providing it. Although Aragon provided support for Isabella's cause and acknowledged her as the sole heir to the crown of Castille, her supporters had extracted concessions. Juan II died in 1479, and Ferdinand succeeded to the throne in January of that year.

In September 1479, Portugal and the Catholic Monarchs of Aragon and Castile resolved major issues between them through the Treaty of Alcáçovas, including the issue of Isabella's rights to the crown of Castile. Through close cooperation, the royal couple were successful in securing political power in the Iberian Peninsula. Ferdinand's father had advised the couple that "neither was powerful without the other." Though their marriage united the two kingdoms, leading to the beginnings of modern Spain, they ruled independently, and their kingdoms retained part of their own regional laws and governments for the next two centuries.

== Royal motto and emblems ==
The coat of arms of the Catholic Monarchs was designed by Antonio de Nebrija with elements to show their cooperation and working in tandem. The royal motto they shared, Tanto monta ("as much one as the other"), came to signify their cooperation." The motto was originally used by Ferdinand as an allusion to the Gordian Knot: Tanto monta, monta tanto, cortar como desatar ("It's one and the same, cutting or untying"), but later adopted as an expression of equality of the monarchs: Tanto monta, monta tanto, Isabel como Fernando ("It's one and the same, Isabella the same as Ferdinand").

Their emblems or heraldic devices, seen at the bottom of the coat of arms, were a yoke (yugo) and a sheaf of arrows (haz de flechas). Y and F are the initials of Ysabel (spelling at the time) and Fernando. A double yoke is worn by a team of oxen, emphasizing the couple's cooperation. Isabella's emblem of arrows showed the armed power of the crown, "a warning to Castilians not acknowledging the reach of royal authority or that greatest of royal functions, the right to mete out justice" by force of violence. The iconography of the royal crest was widely reproduced and was found on various works of art. These badges were later used by the Fascist political party FET y de las JONS, the official party of Francoist Spain (1939–1975), which claimed to represent the inherited glory and the ideals of the Catholic Monarchs.

First Royal Standard of the Catholic Monarchs (1475–92)

Royal Banner of the Catholic Monarchs (1475–92)

Second Royal Standard of the Catholic Monarchs (1492–1504/6)

Coat of Arms of the Catholic Monarchs (1492–1504)

Pennant of the Catholic Monarchs (1492–1504)

== Royal Councils ==
Isabella succeeded to the throne of Castile in 1474 when Ferdinand was still heir-apparent to Aragon, and with Aragon's aid, Isabella's claim to the throne was secured. As Isabella's husband was king of Castile by his marriage and his father still ruled in Aragon, Ferdinand spent more time in Castile than Aragon at the beginning of their marriage. His pattern of residence in Castile persisted even when he succeeded to the throne in 1479, and the absenteeism caused problems for Aragon. These issues were partially addressed by the creation of the Council of Aragon in 1494, which joined the Council of Castile established in 1480. The Council of Castile was intended "to be the central governing body of Castile and the linch-pin of their governmental system" with wide powers and with royal officials who were loyal to them and excluded the old nobility from exercising power in it. The monarchs created the Spanish Inquisition in 1478 to ensure that individuals converting to Christianity did not revert to their old faith or continue practising it. The Council of the Crusade was created under their rule to administer funds from the sale of crusading bulls, a right appointed by the Holy See. In 1498, after Ferdinand had gained control of the revenues of the wealthy and powerful Spanish military orders, he created the Council of Military Orders to oversee them. The conciliar model was extended beyond the rule of the Catholic Monarchs, with their grandson, Charles V, Holy Roman Emperor establishing the Council of the Indies, the Council of Finance, and the Council of State.

== Domestic policy ==
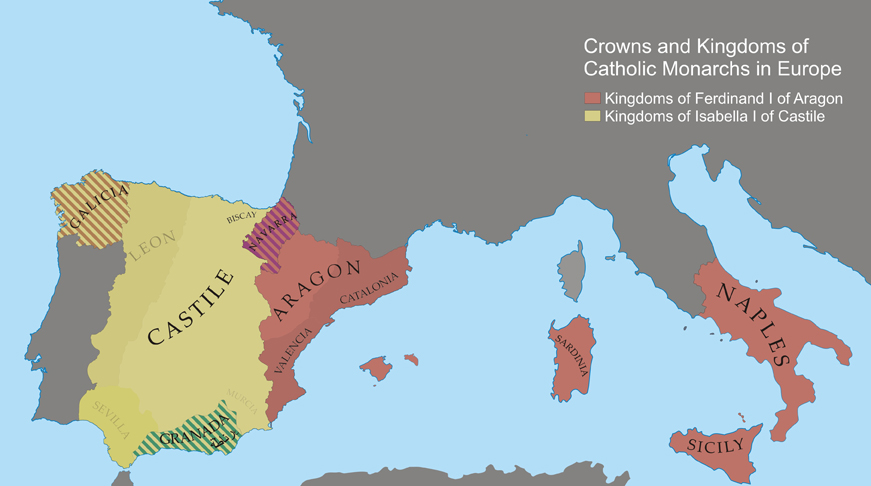
Crowns and Kingdoms of the Catholic Monarchs in Europe (c. 1500)

The Catholic Monarchs set out to restore royal authority in Spain. To accomplish their goal, they first created a group named the Santa Hermandad "Holy Brotherhood". These men were used as a judicial police force for Castile, as well as to attempt to keep Castilian nobles in check. To establish a more uniform judiciary, the Catholic Monarchs created a curia regis and appointed magistrates to run the towns and cities. This establishment of royal authority is known as the "Pacification of Castile" and can be seen as one of the crucial steps toward the creation of one of Europe's first strong nation states. Isabella also sought various ways to diminish the influence of the Cortes Generales in Castile, though Ferdinand was too thoroughly Aragonese to do anything of the sort with the equivalent systems in the Crown of Aragon. Even after his death and the union of the crowns under one monarch, the Aragonese, Catalan, and Valencian Corts (parliaments) retained significant power in their respective regions. Furthermore, the monarchs continued to rule through a form of medieval contractualism, which made their rule pre-modern in several ways. One of those is that they traveled from town to town throughout the kingdom to promote loyalty, rather than possessing any single administrative center. Another is that each community and region was connected to them via loyalty to the crown, rather than bureaucratic ties. (Note: The book Good Faith and Truthful Ignorance by Alexandra and Noble Cook provides a prime example of how loyalty to the crown was more important in that period than the specific governmental structure.)

== Religious policy ==
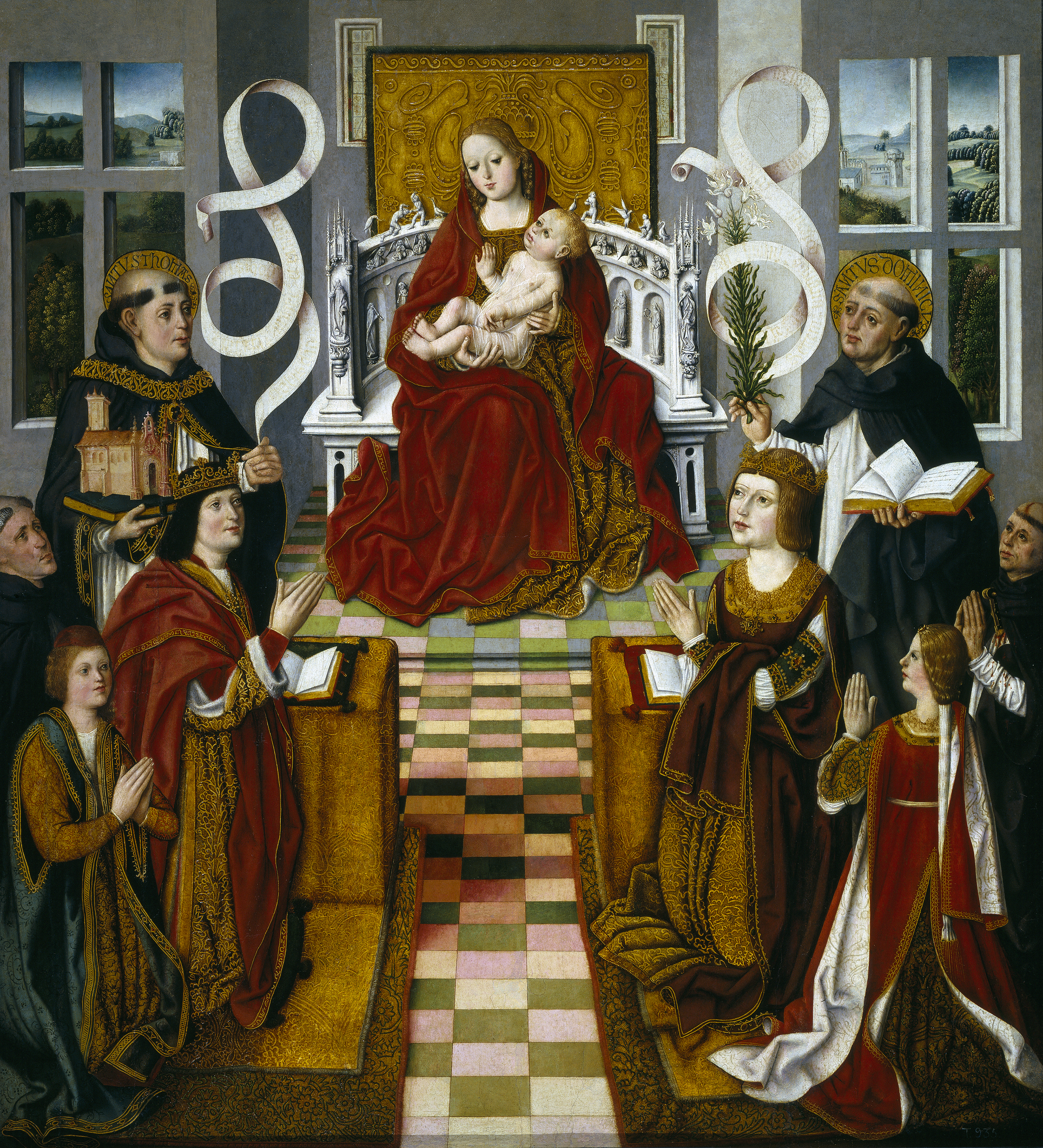
Virgin of the Catholic Monarchs (c. 1491–93). Mary, mother of Jesus (center), with Thomas Aquinas symbolically holding the Catholic Church and Domingo de Guzmán, the Spanish founder of the Dominicans, with a book and a white lilly. Ferdinand is with the prince of Asturias and the inquisitor; Isabella with their daughter, Isabel de Aragón.

Along with the desire of the Catholic Monarchs to extend their dominion to all the kingdoms of the Iberian Peninsula, their reign was characterised by the religious unification of the peninsula through militant Catholicism. On receiving a petition for authority, Pope Sixtus IV issued a bull in 1478 to establish a Holy Office of the Inquisition in Castile. This was to ensure that Jews and Muslims who converted to Christianity did not revert to their previous faiths. The papal bull gave the sovereigns full powers to name inquisitors, but the papacy retained the right to formally appoint the royal nominees. The Inquisition did not have jurisdiction over Jews and Muslims who did not convert. Since the kingdom of Aragon had existed since 1248, the Spanish Inquisition was the only common institution for the two kingdoms. Pope Innocent VIII confirmed Dominican Tomás de Torquemada, a confessor of Isabella, as Grand Inquisitor of Spain, following in the tradition in Aragon of Dominican inquisitors. Torquemada pursued aggressive policies toward converted Jews (conversos) and Muslims moriscos. The pope also granted the Catholic Monarchs the right of patronato real over the ecclesiastical establishment in Granada and the Canary Islands, thereby granting the state control over religious affairs.

The monarchs initiated a series of campaigns known as the Granada War (1482–92), which was supported by Pope Sixtus IV, who granted tithe revenue and implemented a crusade tax to finance the war. After 10 years of fighting, the Granada War ended in 1492 when Emir Boabdil surrendered the keys of the Alhambra Palace in Granada to the Castilian soldiers. With the fall of Granada in January 1492, Isabella and Ferdinand pursued further policies of religious unification of their realms, in particular the expulsion of Jews who refused to convert to Christianity.

In 1492, Ferdinand and Isabella issued the Alhambra Decree, which gave Jews in Spanish-ruled territory four months to either convert to Catholicism or leave the territory. Tens of thousands of Jews emigrated to other lands such as the Kingdom of Portugal, North Africa, the Low Countries, the various countries of Italy, and, in particular, the Ottoman Empire. People who converted to Catholicism were not subject to expulsion, but between 1480 and 1492 hundreds of conversos and moriscos were accused of secretly practising their original religion (crypto-Judaism or crypto-Islam) and arrested, imprisoned, interrogated under torture, and in some cases burned to death, in both Castile and Aragon. Jews whose ancestors were subject to this expulsion and the subsequent Persecution of Jews and Muslims by Manuel I of Portugal are known as Sephardic Jews, and are roughly divided into the Spanish and Portuguese Jews of Western Europe and the Eastern Sephardim of territories along the Mediterranean.

The Inquisition was created in the twelfth century by Pope Lucius III to fight heresy in the south of what is now France and was subsequently established in a number of European kingdoms. The Catholic Monarchs decided to introduce the Inquisition to Castile and requested the Pope's assent. On 1 November 1478, Pope Sixtus IV published the papal bull Exigit Sinceras Devotionis Affectus, by which the Inquisition was established in the Kingdom of Castile; it was later extended to all of Spain. The bull gave the monarchs exclusive authority to name the inquisitors.

During the reign of the Catholic Monarchs and long afterwards, the Inquisition was active in prosecuting people for violations of Catholic orthodoxy such as crypto-Judaism, heresy, Protestantism, blasphemy, and bigamy. The last trial for crypto-Judaism was held in 1818.

== Foreign policy ==
Although the Catholic Monarchs pursued a partnership in many matters, because of the histories of their respective kingdoms, they did not always have a unified viewpoint in foreign policy. Despite that, they did have a successful expansionist foreign policy due to a number of factors. The victory over the Muslims in Granada allowed Ferdinand to involve himself in policy outside the Iberian peninsula.

The diplomatic initiative of King Ferdinand continued the historical policy of the Crown of Aragon. Specifically, its interests set in the Mediterranean as well as in Italy and sought conquests in North Africa. Aragon had a historical rivalry with France, which had been a historical ally of Castile. Castile's foreign interests were focused on the Atlantic, making Castile's funding of the voyage of Columbus an extension of existing interests.

Castile had historically had good relations with the neighboring Kingdom of Portugal, and after the Portuguese lost the War of the Castilian Succession, Castile and Portugal concluded the Treaty of Alcáçovas. The treaty set boundaries for overseas expansion which were at the time disadvantageous to Castile, but the treaty resolved any further Portuguese claims on the crown of Castile. Portugal did not take advantage of Castile's and Aragon's focus on the reconquest of Granada. Following the reestablishment of good relations, the Catholic Monarchs made two strategic marriages to Portuguese royalty.

The matrimonial policy of the monarchs sought advantageous marriages for their five children, forging royal alliances for the long-term benefit of Spain. Their first-born, a daughter named Isabella, married Afonso of Portugal, forging ties between these two neighboring kingdoms that would lead to enduring peace and future alliance. Joanna, their second daughter, married Philip the Handsome, the son of Holy Roman Emperor Maximilian I. This ensured an alliance with the Holy Roman Empire, a powerful, far-reaching European territory which assured Spain's future political security. Their only son, John, married Margaret of Austria, seeking to maintain ties with the Habsburg dynasty, on which Spain relied heavily. Their fourth child, Maria, married Manuel I of Portugal, strengthening the link forged by Isabella's elder sister's marriage. Their fifth child, Catherine, married Arthur, Prince of Wales and heir to the throne of England, in 1501; he died at the age of 15 a few months later, and she married his younger brother shortly after he became King Henry VIII of England in 1509. These alliances were not all long-lasting, with their only son and heir-apparent John dying young; Catherine was divorced by Henry VIII; and Joanna's husband Philip dying young, with the widowed Joanna deemed mentally unfit to rule.

Under the Catholic Monarchs an efficient army loyal to the Crown was created, commanded by Castilian Gonzalo Fernández de Córdoba, known as the Great Captain. Fernández de Córdoba reorganised the military troops on a new combat unit, tercios reales, which entailed the creation of the first modern army dependent on the crown, regardless of the pretensions of the nobles.

== Voyages of Christopher Columbus ==
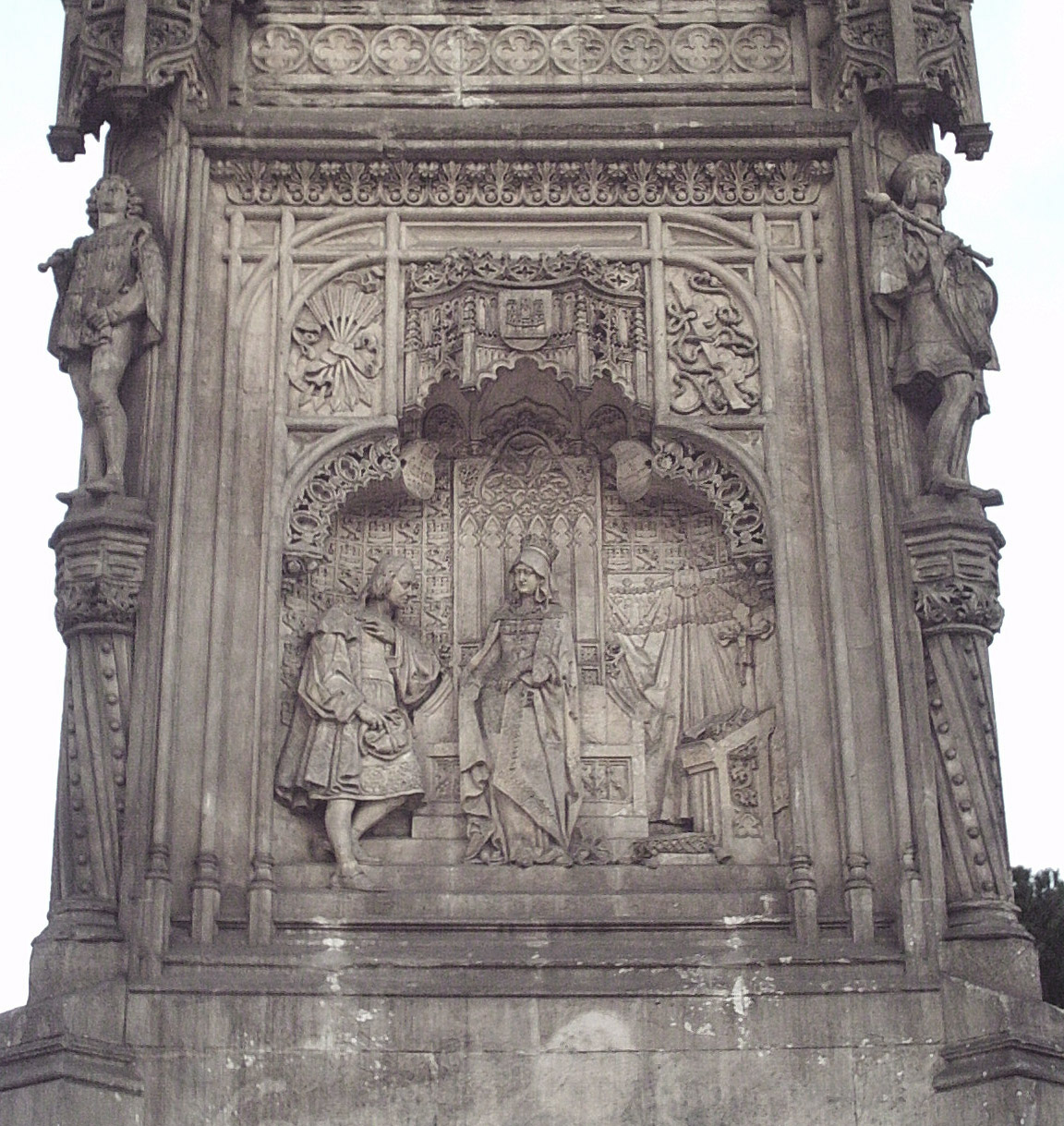
Western side of Monument to Columbus (1881–85). Isabella at the center, Columbus on her left. Plaza de Colón, Madrid

Through the Capitulations of Santa Fe, navigator Christopher Columbus received finances and was authorised to sail west and claim lands for Spain. The monarchs accorded him the title of Admiral of the Ocean Sea and he was given broad privileges. His voyage west resulted in the European colonization of the Americas and brought the knowledge of its existence to Europe.

Columbus' first expedition to the supposed Indies actually landed in the Bahamas on October 12, 1492. Since Queen Isabella had provided the funding and authorization for the voyage, the benefits accrued to the Kingdom of Castile. "Although the subjects of the Crown of Aragon played some part in the discovery and colonization of the New World, the Indies were formally annexed not to Spain but to the Crown of Castile." He landed on the island of Guanahani, and he called it San Salvador. He continued onto Cuba, naming it Juana, and finished his journey on the island of the Dominican Republic and Haiti, calling it Hispaniola, or La Isla Española ("the Spanish [Island]" in Castilian).

On his second trip, begun in 1493, he found more Caribbean islands including Puerto Rico. His main goal was to colonize the existing discoveries with the 1500 men that he had brought the second time around. Columbus finished his last expedition in 1498 and discovered Trinidad and the coast of present-day Venezuela. The colonies Columbus established, and conquests in the Americas in later decades, generated an influx of wealth into the new unified state of Spain, leading it to be the major power of Europe from the end of the fifteenth century until the mid-seventeenth century, and the largest empire until 1810.

== Deaths ==
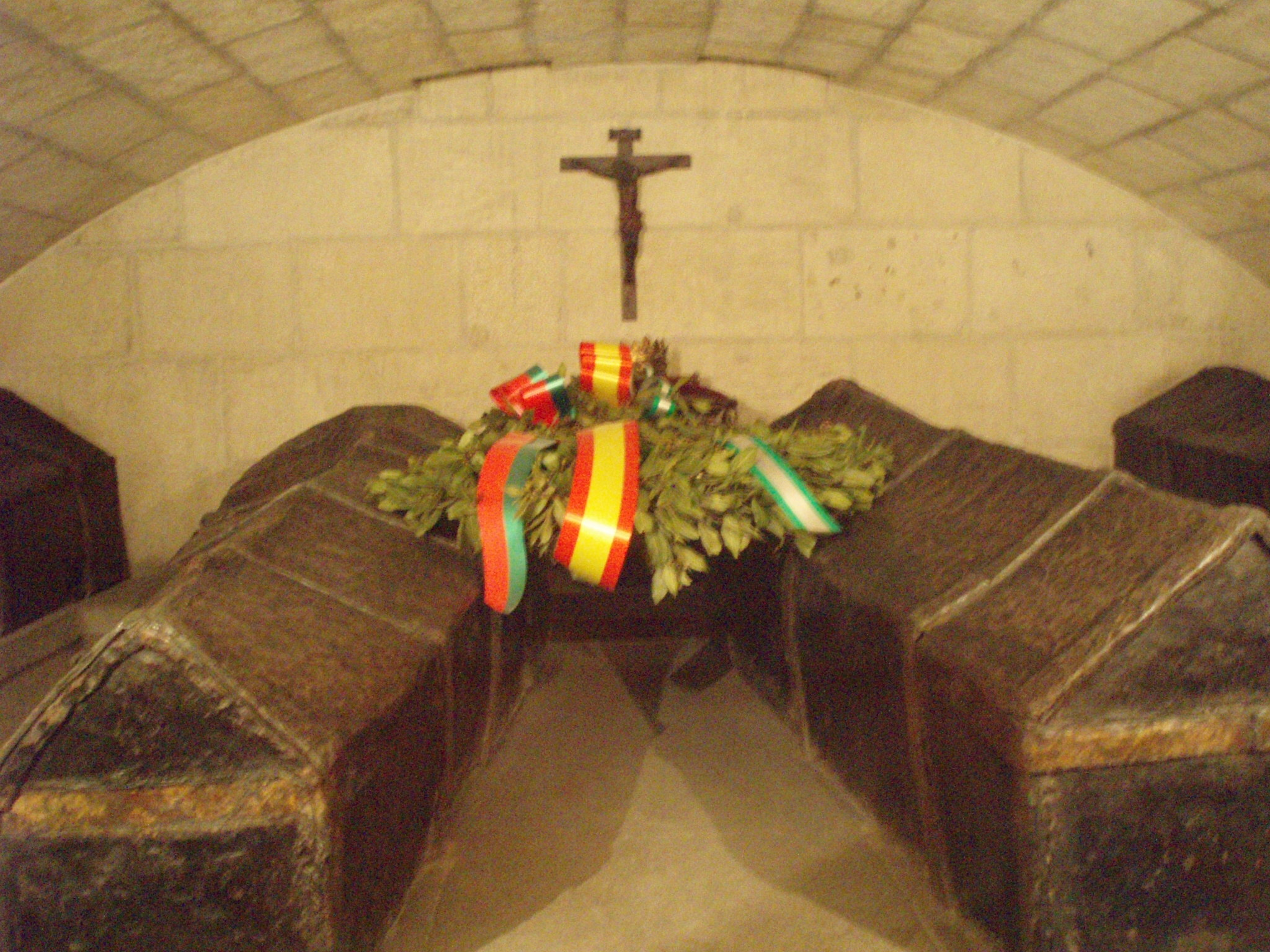
Coffins of the Catholic Monarchs in the Capilla Real, Granada, Spain

Isabella's death in 1504 ended the remarkably successful political partnership and personal relationship of their marriage. Ferdinand remarried Germaine of Foix in 1505, but they produced no living heir. Had there been one, Aragonese opposed to the union would have likely backed their succession as a chance to re-establish independence, leading to civil war. The Catholic Monarchs' daughter Joanna succeeded to the crown of Castile, but was deemed unfit to rule. Following the death of her husband Phillip the Fair, Ferdinand retained power in Castile as regent until his death, with Joanna confined. He died in 1516 and is buried alongside his first wife Isabella in Granada, the scene of their great triumph in 1492. Joanna's son Charles I of Spain (also Charles V, Holy Roman Emperor) came to Spain, and, with her confined in Tordesillas, was nominal co-ruler of both Castile and Aragon until her death. Charles then succeeded to the territories that his grandparents had accumulated and brought the Habsburg territories in Europe to the expanding Spanish Empire.

== See also ==
- Black Propaganda against Portugal and Spain
- Iberian Union
- Portuguese Restoration War
