= Spain in the OTI Festival =

- OTI Festival
- Participating broadcaster: Televisión Española (TVE)

Participation summary
- Appearances: 27
- First appearance: 1972
- Last appearance: 2000
- Highest placement: 1st: 1976, 1981, 1992, 1993, 1995, 1996
- Host: 1972, 1977, 1985, 1992, 1993, 1994
- Participation history: 1972; 1973; 1974; 1975; 1976; 1977; 1978; 1979; 1980; 1981; 1982; 1983; 1984; 1985; 1986; 1987; 1988; 1989; 1990; 1991; 1992; 1993; 1994; 1995; 1996; 1997; 1998; 2000

The participation of Spain in the OTI Festival began at the first OTI Festival in 1972. The Spanish participating broadcaster was Televisión Española (TVE), subsidiary of Radiotelevisión Española (RTVE) and member of the Organización de Televisión Iberoamericana (OTI). TVE participated in twenty-seven of the twenty-eight editions, only missing the 1986 festival as a protest against the military dictatorship of Chile. It won the festival six times: in 1976, 1981, 1992, 1993, 1995, and 1996; and it hosted the event also six times: in 1972, 1977, 1985, 1992, 1993, and 1994.

== History ==
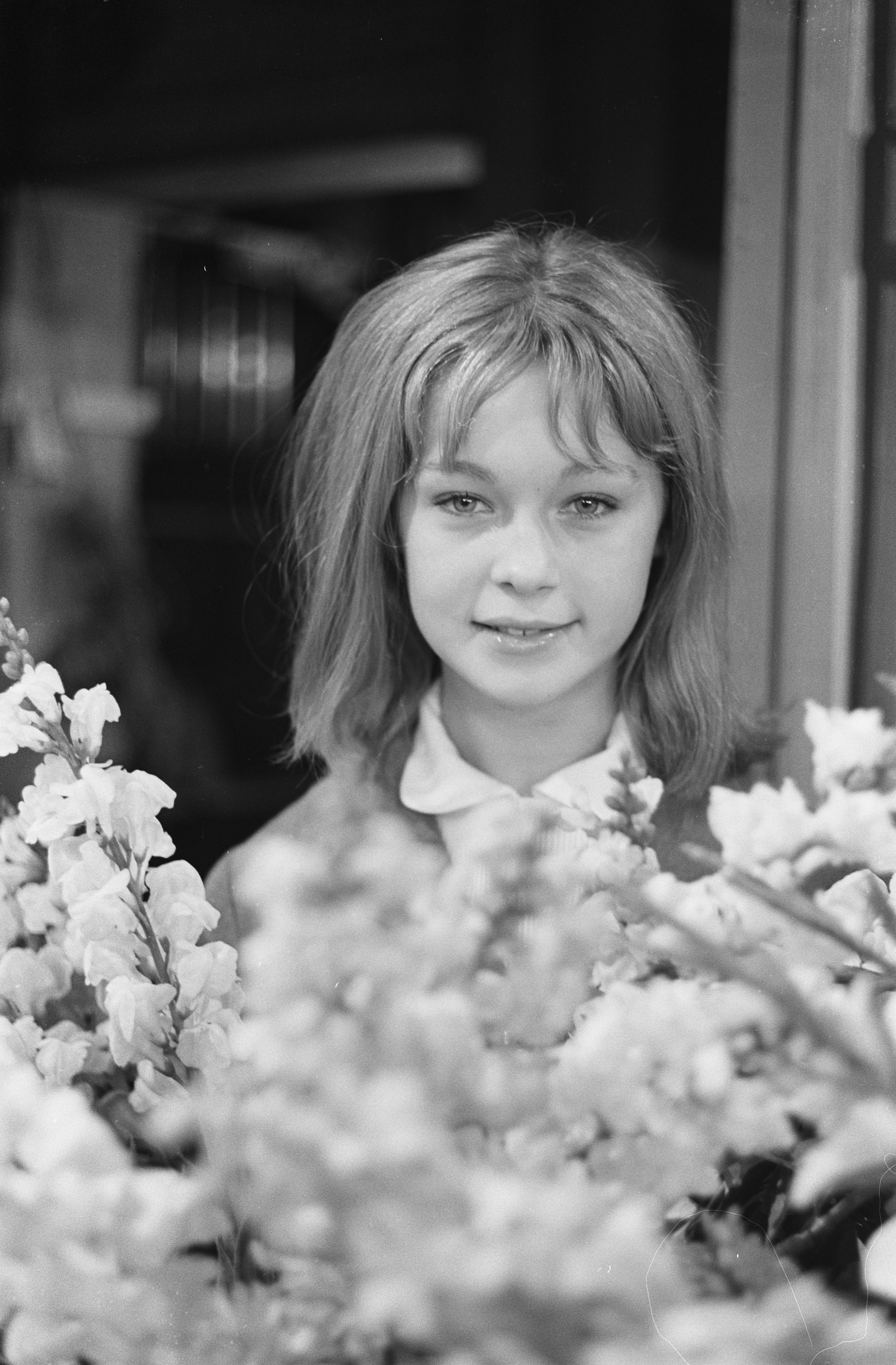
Marisol was the first Spanish OTI performer

Although Televisión Española (TVE) selected their participants internally and didn't follow the tradition of national finals held by other countries, it almost always selected well-known names, most of whom would achieve strong results. It won the event on six occasions, in a tie for most wins with Mexico.

The first Spanish victory came in 1976 with "Canta cigarra" by singer-songwriter María Ostiz. This protest song, which transmitted a deep feeling of sadness, was not one of the favourite ones to win the contest, in fact being among the least favoured entries in the betting odds.

In 1981, TVE achieved its second victory in the festival with "Latino" by Francisco. This song became a great hit both in Spain and Latin America and contributed to launch the career of the singer internationally. Francisco won again the festival in 1992 with the song "A dónde voy sin ti". Since then, the singer started became known as the Latin Johnny Logan because of his two victories. One year later, "Enamorarse" by Ana Reverte achieved the fourth Spanish victory in the festival. The last Spanish victories came with "Eres mi debilidad" by Marcos Llunas in 1995, and "Manos" by Anabel Russ in 1996.

TVE hosted the event six times: in 1972 and 1977 in Madrid; in 1985 in Seville; and in 1992, 1993, and 1994 in Valencia.

=== Spain in OTI vs in Eurovision ===
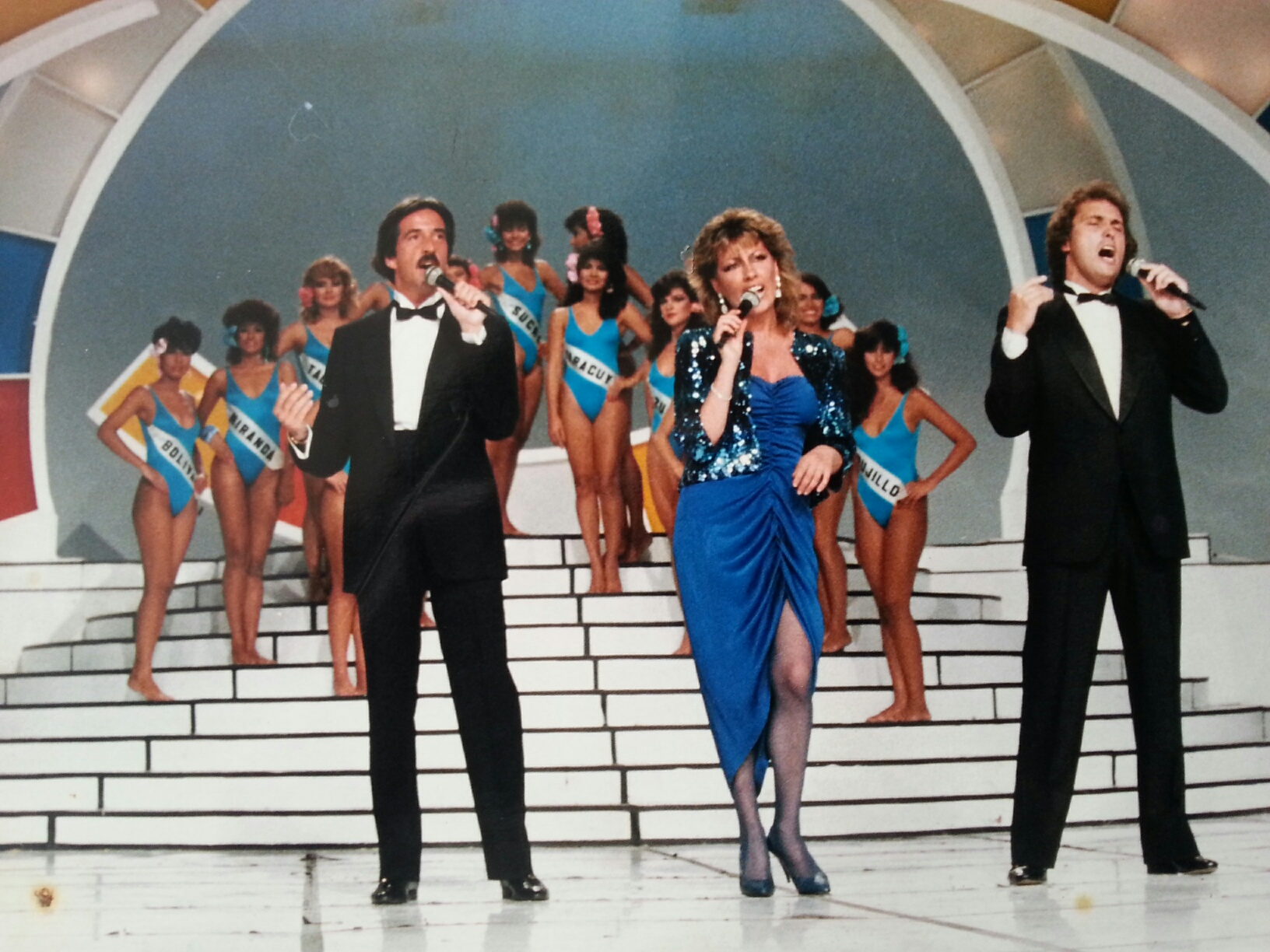
The band Trigo Limpio represented Spain in OTI in 1977 before taking part in the Eurovision Song Contest

TVE was a member of the OTI and the European Broadcasting Union (EBU), so it was eligible to participate in both the OTI Festival and the Eurovision Song Contest representing Spain. Several Spanish entrants in the OTI Festival later represented Spain in the Eurovision Song Contest. The band Trigo Limpio which took part in the OTI Festival 1977 represented Spain in the Eurovision Song Contest 1980. Amaya Saizar, who was the vocalist of Trigo Limpio in the OTI Festival, competed in the Eurovision Song Contest 1984 as member of the band Bravo. Marcos Llunas won the OTI Festival 1995, two years before representing Spain in the Eurovision Song Contest 1997.

Other artists such as the band Álex & Christina tried to represent Spain in the Eurovision Song Contest 1986, but two years after being rejected, they participated in the OTI Festival 1988 achieving 10th place.

In general, the Spanish Eurovision fans claimed that TVE seemed to be more interested in the OTI Festival than in the Eurovision Song Contest. They complained that TVE usually selected famous names for the OTI Festival, while the Spanish performers in Eurovision were unknown to much of the audience.

== Participation overview ==
Table key
1	First place
2	Second place
3	Third place
◇	Contest cancelled

Year	Song	Artist	Songwriter(s)	Conductor	Place	Points
1972	"Niña"	Marisol	Manuel Alejandro	Augusto Algueró	3	7
1973	"Algo más"	Camilo Sesto	Camilo Sesto	Juan Carlos Calderón	5	6
1974	"Lapicero de madera"	Lia Uyá	Lia Uyá	Rafael Ibarbia	4	9
1975	"Amor de medianoche"	Cecilia	Juan Carlos Calderón; Cecilia	Juan Carlos Calderón	2	14
1976	"Canta cigarra"	María Ostiz	María Ostiz	Rafael Ibarbia	1	14
1977	"Rómpeme, mátame"	Trigo Limpio	Juan Carlos Calderón	Juan Carlos Calderón	4	7
1978	"Mi sitio"	Chema Purón	Chema Purón	Julio Mengod	5	18
1979	"Viviré"	Rosa María Lobo	José Luis Moreno; Pablo Herrero; José Luis Armenteros	Eduardo Leiva	4	25
1980	"Querer y perder"	Dyango	Ray Girado	Alfredo Doménech	2	32
1981	"Latino"	Francisco	Pablo Herrero; José Luis Armenteros	Jesús Glück	1	51
1982	"Ay, ay amor"	La Pequeña Compañía	Julio Seijas; Luis Gómez-Escolar	Eddy Guerin	2	27
1983	"¿Quién piensa en ti?"	Gonzalo	Gonzalo Fernández	Danilo Vaona	—N/a	
1984	"Cada día al despertar"	Bohemia	Javier Ibarrondo; Emilio Otero	Eddy Guerín	—N/a	
1985	"Esta forma de querer"	Caco Senante	Caco Senante	Eduardo Leiva	—N/a	
1986	Did not participate					
1987	"Bravo samurái"	Vicky Larraz	Vicky Larraz; Esteban Sastre; Carlos Fernández	Eduardo Leiva	3	—N/a
1988	"Dulce maldición"	Álex & Christina	Christina Rosenvinge; Álex de la Nuez	Eduardo Leiva	10	2
1989	"Como una luz"	José Manuel Soto	José Manuel Soto	Gualberto García	2	—N/a
1990	"Duérmete mi amor"	Paco Ortega e Isabel Montero	Paco Ortega; Santiago Gómez Valverde	Eduardo Leiva	3	—N/a
1991	"Bésame"	Joel	Peret	Alfredo Doménech	F	—N/a
1992	"A dónde voy sin ti"	Francisco	Chema Purón	Jesús Glück	1	—N/a
1993	"Enamorarse"	Ana Reverte	Alejandro Abad; Josep Llobell	José Fabra	1	—N/a
1994	"Cuestión de suerte"	Ana María	Chema Purón	José Fabra	2	28
1995	"Eres mi debilidad"	Marcos Llunas	Alejandro Abad	Javier Capella Sanz	1	—N/a
1996	"Manos"	Anabel Russ	Chema Purón; Eduardo Leiva	Eduardo Leiva	1	—N/a
1997	"Como humo de tabaco"	La Plata	Santiago Vargas	Coco Salazar	3	—N/a
1998	"Desconocidos"	Luis Villa	Luis Villa	Manuel Marvizón	F	—N/a
1999	Contest cancelled ◇					
2000	"Volver al sur"	Sylvia Pantoja	Eladio Ballester; Alberto Tarín	Nando Hernández	F	—N/a

== Hosting ==
Year	City	Venue	Hosts	Ref.
1972	Madrid	Palacio de Congresos y Exposiciones	Rosa María Mateo; Raúl Matas	
1977	Madrid	Centro Cultural de la Villa de Madrid	Mari Cruz Soriano; Miguel de los Santos	
1985	Seville	Teatro Lope de Vega	Paloma San Basilio; Emilio Aragón	
1992	Valencia	Teatro Principal	Paloma San Basilio; Joaquín Prat	
1993	Valencia	Teatro Principal	Paloma San Basilio; Francisco	
1994	Valencia	Teatro Principal	Ana Obregón; Francisco	

== See also ==
- Spain in the Eurovision Song Contest
- Spain in the Junior Eurovision Song Contest
