= OTI Festival 1977 =

6th OTI Song Festival

Date and venue
- Final: 12 November 1977
- Venue: Centro Cultural de la Villa de Madrid auditorium Madrid, Spain

Organization
- Organizer: Organización de Televisión Iberoamericana (OTI)
- Supervisor: Condorcet Da Silva Costa
- Host broadcaster: Radiotelevisión Española (RTVE)
- Musical director: Rafael Ibarbia
- Presenters: Mari Cruz Soriano; Miguel de los Santos

Participants
- Number of entries: 21
- Returning countries: Portugal; Dominican Republic
- Participation map: Participating countries Countries that participated in the past but not in 1977

Vote
- Voting system: Each country's three-member jury had three votes to distribute as wished
- Winning song: Nicaragua "Quincho Barrilete"

OTI Festival 1977 (Spanish: Sexto Gran Premio de la Canción Iberoamericana, Portuguese: Sexto Grande Prêmio da Canção Ibero-Americana) was the sixth edition of the OTI Festival, held on 12 November 1977 at the auditorium of the Centro Cultural de la Villa de Madrid in Madrid, Spain, and presented by Mari Cruz Soriano and Miguel de los Santos. It was organised by the Organización de Televisión Iberoamericana (OTI) and host broadcaster Radiotelevisión Española (RTVE), who staged the event after winning the 1976 festival for Spain with the song "Canta cigarra" by María Ostiz.

Broadcasters from twenty-one countries participated in the festival, setting a new record for the number of participating entries. The winner was the song "Quincho Barrilete", written by Carlos Mejía Godoy, and performed by Eduardo "Guayo" González representing Nicaragua.

== Location ==
Centro Cultural de la Villa de Madrid – host venue of the OTI Festival 1977.

According to the rules of the OTI Festival at the time, the winning broadcaster of the previous edition would host the festival the following year. The Organización de Televisión Iberoamericana (OTI) designated Radiotelevisión Española (RTVE), which was the winning broadcaster of the previous edition with the song "Canta cigarra" by María Ostiz for Spain, as the host broadcaster of the 1977 edition.

The RTVE hosting committee decided that Madrid was the most suitable city to host the OTI Festival, due to its notable infrastructure and experience in hosting international expositions and also because of its growing reputation as a tourist hub. The venue selected was at the auditorium of the Centro Cultural de la Villa de Madrid, a venue located under the Jardines del Descubrimiento at Plaza de Colón. This cultural center was inaugurated on 15 May 1977, a few months before the festival. In 2007, the auditorium was renamed Teatro Fernán Gómez.

The stage of the festival had a triangular shape and a light blue color with some metallic elements on top and the OTI logo in one of the corners. The stage was divided in two parts, the orchestral one and the central one, where the competing singers and bands gave their performances. There was a black scoreboard with electromechanical flip white numbers on the right side of the hall.

== Participants ==
Broadcasters from twenty-one countries participated in this edition of the OTI Festival. The OTI members, public or private broadcasters from Spain, Portugal, and nineteen Spanish and Portuguese speaking countries of Ibero-America signed up for the festival. This number of participants broke the previous record of nineteen participants that was reached in 1974. All the countries that participated in the previous edition returned, joined by Portugal, which had missed the festival since 1974, and the Dominican Republic, which had missed the 1976 edition.

Some of the participating broadcasters, such as those representing Chile, Guatemala, and Mexico, selected their entries through their regular national televised competitions. Other broadcasters, among them the host broadcaster, decided to select their entry internally.

Participants of the OTI Festival 1977
Country	Broadcaster(s)	Song	Artist	Songwriter(s)	Language	Conductor
Argentina	Teleonce	"Jugar a vivir"	Jerónimo	Juan José Camero; Jerónimo	Spanish	Javier Iturralde
Brazil	Rede Tupi	"Pedindo amor"	Lolita Rodrigues	Enéas Machado de Assis	Portuguese; Spanish	Élcio Álvarez
Chile	TVN; UCTV; UTV; UCVTV	"Oda a mi guitarra"	Capri	Nano Acevedo	Spanish	Juan Azúa
Colombia	Caracol Televisión; PUNCH; RTI	"Cantando"	Ximena	Raúl Rosero Polo	Spanish	Diego Rodríguez
Costa Rica	Telecentro	"Melodía de los amantes"	Manuel Chamorro	Manuel Chamorro	Spanish	Jonathán Zarzosa
Dominican Republic		"Al nacer cada enero"	Fernando Casado	Cheo Zorrilla	Spanish	Rafael Ibarbia
Ecuador		"Sonreir cuando quiero llorar"	Marielisa	Luis Padilla Guevara	Spanish	Claudio Fabbri
El Salvador	Canal Cuatro	"Enséñame a vivir"	Ana Marcela D'Antonio	Ana Marcela D'Antonio	Spanish	Rafael Ibarbia
Guatemala		"El verbo amar"	Mildred y Manolo	Julio César del Valle	Spanish	Rafael Ibarbia
Honduras		"El hombre"	Tony Morales	Rodolfo Bonilla	Spanish	Rafael Ibarbia
Mexico	Televisa	"Hombre"	Napoleón	José María Napoleón	Spanish	Jonathán Zarzosa
Netherlands Antilles	ATM	"Gente eres tú"	Ced Ride	Ced Ride	Spanish	Rafael Ibarbia
Nicaragua	Televicentro de Nicaragua	"Quincho Barrilete"	Guayo González	Carlos Mejía Godoy	Spanish	Manolo Gas
Panama	RPC-TV	"Canta a la vida"	Leopoldo Hernández	Leopoldo Hernández	Spanish	Rafael Ibarbia
Peru	Panamericana Televisión	"Landó"	Cecilia Bracamonte	Chabuca Granda	Spanish	Pancho Sáenz
Portugal	RTP	"Amor sem palavras"	Paulo de Carvalho	Joaquim Pessoa; Paulo de Carvalho	Portuguese	Thilo Krasmann
Puerto Rico	Canal 2 Telemundo	"Piel dorada"	Aqua Marina	Edgardo Díaz; Leyda Colón; César Antonio Reyes	Spanish	Wilson Torres Jr.
Spain	TVE	"Rómpeme mátame"	Trigo Limpio	Juan Carlos Calderón	Spanish	Juan Carlos Calderón
United States	SIN	"Si hay amor, volverá"	Lissette	Lissette Álvarez	Spanish	Frank Fiore
Uruguay	Sociedad Televisora Larrañaga	"Quiero vivir"	Miguel Bobbio	Mario de Azagra	Spanish	Julio Frade
Venezuela	RCTV	"Iberoamérica toda"	Héctor José	Esteban Ballester; Hernán Ríos	Spanish	Cholo Ortiz

== Festival overview ==
The festival was held on Saturday 12 November 1977, beginning at 24:00 CET (23:00 UTC). (Note: Which was actually Sunday 13 November in peninsular Spain.) It was presented by Mari Cruz Soriano and Miguel de los Santos. The musical director was Rafael Ibarbia who conducted the 44-piece RTVE Light Music Orchestra and the mixed choir of six voices when required. The draw to determine the running order (R/O) was held at Prado del Rey a few days before the event. The show featured an orchestral performance of "Canta cigarra", the winning song from the previous year.

The winner was the song "Quincho Barrilete", written by Carlos Mejía Godoy, and performed by Eduardo "Guayo" González representing Nicaragua. Its performer and its conductor received a trophy each, while its songwriter received two, (Note: Collected by Octavio Sacasa, head of the Nicaraguan delegation, since Carlos Mejía Godoy was absent.) one for composer and another for lyricist. The trophy for the performer was delivered by María Ostiz; the one for the lyricist by Luis Ezcurra, vice-president of OTI; the one for the conductor by Jesús Álvarez Botero, president of the OTI programs committee; and the one for the composer by Guillermo Cañedo, president of OTI. The festival ended with a reprise of the winning entry.

Winner

Results of the OTI Festival 1977
R/O	Country	Song	Artist	Votes	Place
1	Netherlands Antilles	"Gente, eres tú"	Ced Ride	1	14
2	Brazil	"Pedindo amor"	Lolita Rodrigues	0	17
3	Puerto Rico	"Piel dorada"	Aqua Marina	3	6
4	Uruguay	"Quiero vivir"	Miguel Bobbio	2	11
5	Honduras	"El hombre"	Tony Morales	0	17
6	Spain	"Rómpeme, mátame"	Trigo Limpio	7	4
7	Mexico	"Hombre"	Napoleón	0	17
8	Dominican Republic	"Al nacer cada enero"	Fernando Casado	8	2
9	United States	"Si hay amor, volverá"	Lissette	8	2
10	Ecuador	"Sonreír cuando quiero llorar"	Marielisa	4	5
11	Argentina	"Jugar a vivir"	Jerónimo	3	6
12	Venezuela	"Iberoamérica toda"	Héctor José	3	6
13	Nicaragua	"Quincho Barrilete"	Guayo González	12	1
14	Chile	"Oda a mi guitarra"	Capri	2	11
15	Guatemala	"El verbo amar"	Mildred y Manolo	0	17
16	Colombia	"Cantando"	Ximena	1	14
17	Panama	"Canta a la vida"	Leopoldo Hernández	2	11
18	Portugal	"Amor sem palavras"	Paulo de Carvalho	1	14
19	Peru	"Landó"	Cecilia Bracamonte	3	6
20	Costa Rica	"Melodía de los amantes"	Manuel Chamorro	0	17
21	El Salvador	"Enséñame a vivir"	Ana Marcela D'Antonio	3	6

=== Spokespersons ===
Each participating broadcaster (Note: Or group of broadcasters that jointly participated representing a country.) appointed a spokesperson who was responsible for announcing the votes for their respective jury in the order of participation via telephone. Known spokespersons at the 1977 festival are listed below.

- Puerto Rico – Nydia Caro
- Spain – Matías Prats Luque
- Chile – Juan Guillermo Vivado
- Colombia – Magda Egas
- Peru – Luis Ángel Pinasco
- El Salvador – Altagracia Arévalo

== Detailed voting results ==
Due to the increasing number of participants and the resulting longer duration of the competition, the number of judges per country that had been used until then (five) was reduced and some rules were slightly modified.

Each participating broadcaster assembled a national jury located in its respective country, composed of three members each. Of those three members, at least one had to be a woman, and at least one had to be under 25 years old. The jury had three votes at its disposal that could distribute as wished between its favorite entry or entries, and could not vote for the entry representing its own country. Each participating broadcaster had also a delegate present in the hall to stand in for its jury if it was not receiving the event live, or in case of communication failure during the broadcast or voting. To ensure that there was no vote switching, before the voting segment began each participating broadcaster announced to its national audience the vote of its jury in local opt-out from its studios. In the event of a tie for first place, the stand-in delegates from the countries not affected by the tie would vote to select the winning song from among the tied ones. If a tie persisted after this second round, the entries with the highest number of votes would be declared joint winners ex aequo.

All the countries gave their votes remotely by telephone, except for Brazil, the Netherlands Antilles, and the United States, which used the stand-in delegates. The countries voted in order of participation, but due to a communication problem with the spokespersons of Honduras, Ecuador, and Venezuela, these had to be left for the end, with Venezuela ending up unable to respond and having to also use the stand-in delegate.

Winner

Detailed voting results of the OTI Festival 1977
Voter: National jury Stand-in delegate		Voting countries																					Classification	
Voter: National jury Stand-in delegate		Netherlands Antilles	Brazil	Puerto Rico	Uruguay	Honduras	Spain	Mexico	Dominican Republic	United States	Ecuador	Argentina	Venezuela	Nicaragua	Chile	Guatemala	Colombia	Panama	Portugal	Peru	Costa Rica	El Salvador	Votes	Place
Contestants	Netherlands Antilles											1											1	14
Contestants	Brazil																						0	17
Contestants	Puerto Rico								1	1										1			3	6
Contestants	Uruguay											1								1			2	11
Contestants	Honduras																						0	17
Contestants	Spain	1						1				1		1					1	1		1	7	4
Contestants	Mexico																						0	17
Contestants	Dominican Republic	1	1								2					2		1				1	8	2
Contestants	United States			3				2					1		1		1						8	2
Contestants	Ecuador				1				1					1	1								4	5
Contestants	Argentina				1												2						3	6
Contestants	Venezuela		1							1				1									3	6
Contestants	Nicaragua					3	1			1	1					1		1	2		1	1	12	1
Contestants	Chile		1		1																		2	11
Contestants	Guatemala																						0	17
Contestants	Colombia														1								1	14
Contestants	Panama											1								1			2	11
Contestants	Portugal								1														1	14
Contestants	Peru	1					2																3	6
Contestants	Costa Rica																						0	17
Contestants	El Salvador												1					1		1			3	6

== Broadcast ==
The festival was broadcast in the 21 participating countries, where the corresponding OTI member broadcasters relayed the contest through their networks after receiving it live via satellite. The day after the festival, TVE aired a special episode of its variety show 300 millones dedicated to the event, which was transmitted to all OTI members.

Known details on the broadcasts of the festival in each country, including the specific broadcasting stations, commentators, and presenters of the local opt-out are shown in the tables below.

Broadcasters, commentators, and local presenters in participating countries
Country	Broadcaster	Channel(s)	Commentator(s)	Local presenter(s)	Ref.
Argentina	Teleonce				
Colombia	Inravisión (Note: Through the programadoras: Caracol Televisión, Producciones Nacionales Colombianas de Hoy (PUNCH), and Radio Televisión Interamericana (RTI).)	Primera Cadena		Magda Egas	
Costa Rica	Telecentro	Telecentro Canal 6			
Mexico	Televisa	Canal 2			
Portugal	RTP	RTP1			
Spain	TVE	TVE 1	No commentary	Matías Prats Luque	

== Reception ==
This edition of the festival not only broke the record of participating countries with twenty-one, but also reached a record of potential viewers with a striking viewing figures of three hundred million, one hundred million more than the previous edition.

The Nicaraguan victory in the contest, its first and only victory, and also the only victory of a Central American country in the event, became a hit in Nicaragua and its success affected both the performer Eduardo González and the song's writer Carlos Mejía Godoy. The lyrics of the song were also regarded as highly representative of the serious problems in Latin American society such as poverty. The song tells the history of a boy known as "Quincho Barrilete" a poor boy who tries to earn an honest living and to save money so that his younger brothers could go to the school in the future. A part of the chorus says "Long live the young people of my homeland," who are a clear example of poverty and dignity.

The song "Rómpeme mátame" by the Spanish band Trigo Limpio also became a hit in Spain and Latin America. Although the lyrics of the song were controversial because they described a tortuous and possessive relationship, the fourth place that the band got consolidated their career in Latin America. Three years later, they would represent Spain in the Eurovision Song Contest at the 1980 edition. Amaya Saizar, who was then the female vocalist of Trigo Limpio, would also participate in the Eurovision Song Contest at the 1984 edition as the female member of the band Bravo.

The Ecuadorian performer Marielisa also performed a song with a social background which was considered to be a response to the winning song of the festival in 1974 in Acapulco. While the message of the song of Nydia Caro states that songs don't improve the problems of the Latin American society, Marielisa's song, which ended fifth in the contest, states that those same problems must not be ignored.

Despite the last place of Mexico, José María Napoleón's song "Hombre" became a hit and launched his career.
