= Chile in the OTI Festival 1977 =

- OTI Festival 1977
- Participating broadcasters: Televisión Nacional de Chile (TVN); Corporación de Televisión de la Universidad Católica de Chile (UCTV); Corporación de Televisión de la Universidad de Chile (UTV); Corporación de Televisión de la Universidad Católica de Valparaíso (UCVTV)
- Country: Chile
- Selection process: National final
- Selection date: 9 October 1977

Competing entry
- Song: "Oda a mi guitarra"
- Artist: Capri
- Songwriter: Nano Acevedo

Placement
- Final result: 11th, 2 votes

Participation chronology
◄1976 •	1977	• 1978►

Chile was represented at the OTI Festival 1977 with the song "Oda a mi guitarra", written by Nano Acevedo, and performed by Capri. The Chilean participating broadcasters, Televisión Nacional de Chile (TVN), Corporación de Televisión de la Universidad Católica de Chile (UCTV), Corporación de Televisión de la Universidad de Chile (UTV), and Corporación de Televisión de la Universidad Católica de Valparaíso (UCVTV), jointly selected their entry through a televised national final. The song, that was performed in position 14, placed eleventh out of 21 competing entries, with 2 votes tying with the entries from Panama and Uruguay.

== National stage ==
Televisión Nacional de Chile (TVN), Corporación de Televisión de la Universidad Católica de Chile (UCTV), Corporación de Televisión de la Universidad de Chile (UTV), and Corporación de Televisión de la Universidad Católica de Valparaíso (UCVTV), held a national final jointly to select their entry for the 6th edition of the OTI Festival. Twelve songs were shortlisted for the televised final.

Competing entries on the national final – Chile 1977
Song	Artist	Songwriter(s)
"Amigo y poeta"		Luis Riderelli
"Amor americano"	Gloria Simonetti	Luis Advis
"Amor de manzanita"	Florcita Motuda	Raúl Florcita Alarcón Rojas
"Ana Ariki"	Fernando Ubiergo	Fernando Ubiergo
"Arauco"	Ángel Maulén	Ángel Maulén
"Doña María"	Carlos Romero	Carlos Romero
"Jardinero del mar"	Julio Zegers	Julio Zegers
"Juan sin sandalias"	Roberto Viking Valdés	Ernesto Rencoret
"Mi padre"	Sergio Lillo	Pedro Flores; Miguel Moreno
"Oda a mi guitarra"	Capri	Nano Acevedo
"Para comprar un mañana"		Osvaldo Jeldres
"Un momento de ternura"	Ricardo de la Fuente	Ricardo de la Fuente

=== National final ===
The national final was held on Sunday 9 October 1977, beginning at 23:15 CLST (02:15+1 UTC), and was presented by Juan Guillermo Vivado. It was broadcast on TVN's Canal 7, UCTV's Canal 13, UTV's Canal 9, and UCVTV's Canal 5.

The jury was composed of Alicia Puccio, Maitén Montenegro, Carlos Videla, César Antonio Santis, Pepe Gallinato, Camilo Fernández, and Patricio Martínez.

The winner was "Oda a mi guitarra", written by Nano Acevedo, and performed by Capri.

Winner

Result of the national final – Chile 1977
R/O	Song	Artist	Result
	"Amor americano"	Gloria Simonetti	
	"Arauco"	Ángel Maulén	
	"Jardinero del mar"	Julio Zegers	
	"Un momento de ternura"	Ricardo de la Fuente	
	"Amor de manzanita"	Florcita Motuda	
	"Mi padre"	Sergio Lillo	
	"Ana Ariki"	Fernando Ubiergo	
	"Doña María"	Carlos Romero	
	"Para comprar un mañana"		
	"Amigo y poeta"		
	"Juan sin sandalias"	Roberto Viking Valdés	
	"Oda a mi guitarra"	Capri	1

== At the OTI Festival ==
On 12 November 1977, the OTI Festival was held at the auditorium of the Centro Cultural de la Villa de Madrid in Madrid, Spain, hosted by Radiotelevisión Española (RTVE), and broadcast live throughout Ibero-America. Capri performed "Oda a mi guitarra" in position 14, with Juan Azúa conducting the event's orchestra, placed eleventh out of 21 competing entries, with 2 votes tying with the entries from Panama and Uruguay.

=== Voting ===
Each participating broadcaster, or group of broadcasters that jointly participated representing a country, assembled a three-member jury who had three votes to distribute as wished.

Votes awarded to Chile
Score	Country
1 vote	Brazil; Uruguay

Votes awarded by Chile
Score	Country
1 vote	Colombia; Ecuador; United States
