= Mexico in the OTI Festival 1977 =

- OTI Festival 1977
- Participating broadcaster: Televisa
- Country: Mexico
- Selection process: National OTI Festival
- Selection date: 9 October 1977

Competing entry
- Song: "Hombre"
- Artist: José María Napoleón
- Songwriter: José María Napoleón

Placement
- Final result: 17th, 0 votes

Participation chronology
◄1976 •	1977	• 1978►

Mexico was represented at the OTI Festival 1977 with the song "Hombre", written and performed by José María Napoleón. The Mexican participating broadcaster, Televisa, selected its entry through a national televised competition with several phases. The song, that was performed in position 7, placed 17th out of 21 competing entries, tying with zero votes with the songs from Brazil, Costa Rica, Guatemala, and Honduras.

== National stage ==
Televisa held a national competition with four televised qualifying rounds and a final to select its entry for the 6th edition of the OTI Festival. This sixth edition of the National OTI Festival featured forty songs, of which ten reached the final.

The shows were held at Televisa San Ángel studios in Mexico City, were presented by Raúl Velasco, and were broadcast on Canal 2 within the show Siempre en Domingo. The musical director was Chucho Ferrer, who conducted the Single Union of Music Workers of Mexico orchestra when required. Hermanos Zavala, the single mixed backing choir, were credited on the songs they accompanied.

Competing entries on the National OTI Festival – Mexico 1977
Song	Artist	Songwriter(s)	Conductor
"Aleluya, soy un loco"	Gualberto Castro	Felipe Gil	
"Amarte a ti"	Guadalupe Trigo	Guadalupe Trigo; Eduardo Salas	
"Amar, amor"	Héctor Meneses	Héctor Meneses	
"Amor, yo soy el mundo"	Luis Demetrio	Luis Demetrio	
"Aquella edad"	Massías	Jorge Massías Gómez	
"Así te amo"	Paulyna	Mario Arturo; Eduardo Magallanes	
"Buenos días"	Los Randal	Raúl Aguilar; Edgar Aguilar	
"Canción de amor"	Guadalupe Trigo	Guadalupe Trigo	
"Canta"	Álvaro Dávila	Álvaro Dávila	
"Con las velas extendidas"	Margarita Robleda	Margarita Robleda	
"Con tu amor"	José Luis Almada	José Luis Almada	
"Cuando me vaya"	Sergio Esquivel	Sergio Esquivel	
"Cuando regreses voveré a sonreir"	Grupo Hermanos and friends	Lázaro Muñiz; Armando Martínez	
"Dale amor al mundo"	Los Baby's	Enrique Ávila	
"Déjame volar"	Irasema	Irasema	
"El amor que nunca tuve"	Rosalba	Enrique Velázquez	
"El derecho de nacer"	Los VIP's	Ray Romano	
"El labrador"	Los Cinco Amigos	José Sierra Flores	
"El soñador"	Grupo Brujos y Brujas	Jorge Patricio; Sergio Luna	
"Eran dos"	Silvia and Gilberto	José Pineda Contreras	
"Fabricante de soledad"	Paulyna	Jesús Rincón; Martha Cano	
"Hombre"	José María Napoleón	José María Napoleón	
"La escuela de la vida"	Felipe Gil	Felipe Gil	
"La rosa blanca"	Héctor Meneses	Héctor Meneses	
"Luciana"	Sergio Esquivel	Sergio Esquivel	
"Mi nombre es mujer"	María Medina	María Medina	
"Nacer"	Dulce	Roberto Gómez Bolaños	
"Profecía"	María Medina	Mario Arturo; Mario Patrón	
"¿Quién soy?"	Sola	Jorge Ortega; Eduardo Salas	
"Rocinante"	Sonia Rivas	Javier Cureño	
"Sencillamente nunca"	Luis "Vivi" Hernández	Alberto Ángel; Mario Molina Montes	
"Señor de edad"	José María Napoleón	José María Napoleón	
"Siempre adelante"	Mario Quintero	Mario Quintero	
"Sola"	Lulú Manzano	Eduardo Manzano	
"Soy tiempo"	Sola	Javier Cureño; Jonathán Zarzosa	
"Te acordarás de mí"	Arturo Castro and Castro's 78	Arturo Castro	
"Tu primera vez"	Yoshio	José Rendón; Miguel Medina; Yoshio	
"Un nuevo amanecer"	Fernando Riba	Jonathán Zarzosa; Fernando Riba	
"Una vieja canción de amor"	Álvaro Dávila	Álvaro Dávila	
"Yo soy como tú"	María del Carmen	Gil Ribera	

=== Qualifying rounds ===
The four qualifying rounds were held on Sundays 4, 11, 18, and 25 September 1977. The ten highest-scoring entries among the forty competing advanced to the final.

Qualifier

Result of the qualifying rounds of the National OTI Festival – Mexico 1977
R/O	Song	Artist	Result
First qualifying round – 4 September 1977
1	"Aquella edad"	Massías	—N/a
2	"Con las velas extendidas"	Margarita Robleda	—N/a
3	"El derecho de nacer"	Los VIP's	—N/a
4	"Con tu amor"	José Luis Almada	—N/a
5	"Sola"	Lulú Manzano	—N/a
6	"El labrador"	Los Cinco Amigos	Qualified
7	"Cuando me vaya"	Sergio Esquivel	Qualified
8	"Rocinante"	Sonia Rivas	—N/a
9	"¿Quién soy?"	Sola	—N/a
10	"Amor, yo soy el mundo"	Luis Demetrio	—N/a
Second qualifying round – 11 September 1977
1	"Cuando regreses voveré a sonreir"	Grupo Hermanos and friends	—N/a
2	"El amor que nunca tuve"	Rosalba	—N/a
3	"Señor de edad"	José María Napoleón	—N/a
4	"Fabricante de soledad"	Paulyna	—N/a
5	"Nacer"	Dulce	—N/a
6	"Amar, amor"	Héctor Meneses	Qualified
7	"Una vieja canción de amor"	Álvaro Dávila	Qualified
8	"Profecía"	María Medina	—N/a
9	"Canción de amor"	Guadalupe Trigo	—N/a
Third qualifying round – 18 September 1977
1	"Tu primera vez"	Yoshio	—N/a
2	"El soñador"	Grupo Brujos y Brujas	—N/a
3	"Eran dos"	Silvia and Gilberto	—N/a
4	"Buenos días"	Los Randal	—N/a
5	"Déjame volar"	Irasema	—N/a
6	"Siempre adelante"	Mario Quintero	—N/a
7	"Yo soy como tú"	María del Carmen	—N/a
8	"Un nuevo amanecer"	Fernando Riba	—N/a
9	"Así te amo"	Paulyna	Qualified
10	"Te acordarás de mí"	Arturo Castro and Castro's 78	—N/a
11	"La escuela de la vida"	Felipe Gil	—N/a
Fourth qualifying round – 25 September 1977
1	"Dale amor al mundo"	Los Baby's	—N/a
2	"Luciana"	Sergio Esquivel	Qualified
3	"Canta"	Álvaro Dávila	Qualified
4	"Soy tiempo"	Sola	—N/a
5	"Amarte a ti"	Guadalupe Trigo	—N/a
6	"Mi nombre es mujer"	María Medina	—N/a
7	"La rosa blanca"	Héctor Meneses	Qualified
8	"Aleluya, soy un loco"	Gualberto Castro	—N/a
9	"Sencillamente nunca"	Luis "Vivi" Hernández	Qualified
10	"Hombre"	José María Napoleón	Qualified

=== Final ===
The final was held on Sunday 9 October 1977. The winner was "Hombre", written and performed by José María Napoleón. The festival ended with a reprise of the winning entry.

Winner

Result of the final of the National OTI Festival – Mexico 1977
R/O	Song	Artist	Result
1	"Sencillamente nunca"	Luis "Vivi" Hernández	4
2	"Luciana"	Sergio Esquivel	
3	"La rosa blanca"	Héctor Meneses	
4	"Así te amo"	Paulyna	3
5	"Canta"	Álvaro Dávila	2
6	"Hombre"	José María Napoleón	1
7	"Amar, amor"	Héctor Meneses	
8	"El labrador"	Los Cinco Amigos	
9	"Cuando me vaya"	Sergio Esquivel	
10	"Una vieja canción de amor"	Álvaro Dávila	5

=== Official album ===
Las 10 finalistas del Festival OTI 77 is the official compilation album of the sixth edition of the Mexican National OTI Festival, released by Cisne in 1977. The vinyl LP features the studio version of the ten songs qualified for the national final.

== At the OTI Festival ==
On 12 November 1977, the OTI Festival was held at the auditorium of the Centro Cultural de la Villa de Madrid in Madrid, Spain, hosted by Radiotelevisión Española (RTVE), and broadcast live throughout Ibero-America. José María Napoleón performed "Hombre" in position 7, with Jonathán Zarzosa conducting the event's orchestra, and placing 17th out of 21 competing entries, tying with zero votes with the songs from Brazil, Costa Rica, Guatemala, and Honduras.

=== Voting ===
Each participating broadcaster assembled a three-member jury who had three votes to distribute as wished. Mexico did not receive any votes.

Votes awarded by Mexico
Score	Country
2 votes	United States
1 vote	Spain
