= Statue of Christopher Columbus (Central Park) =

Statue in Central Park, Manhattan, New York, U.S.

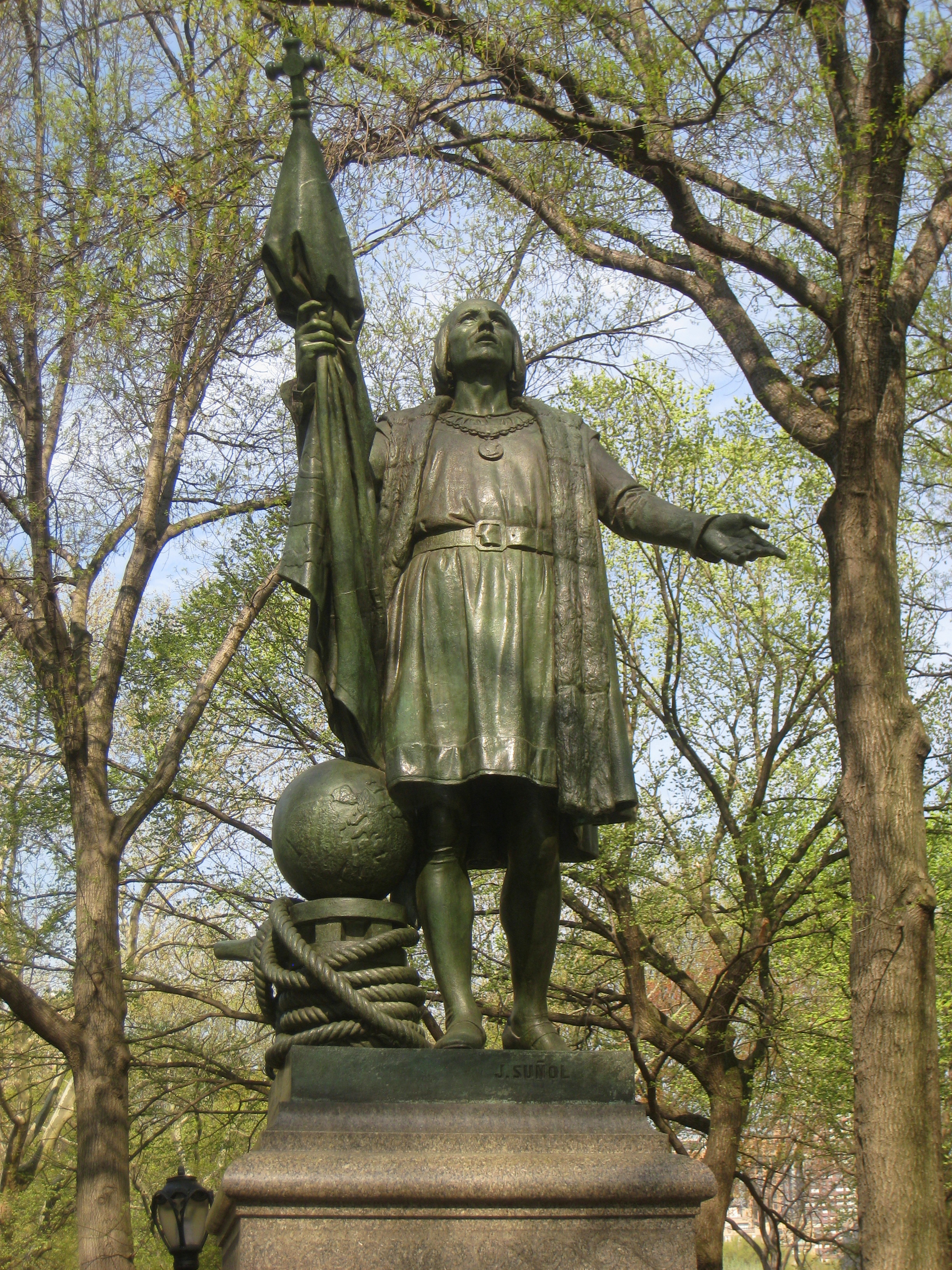
- The sculpture in 2010
- Artist: Jeronimo Suñol
- Year: 1892
- Type: Sculpture
- Medium: Bronze
- Subject: Christopher Columbus
- Location: New York City, New York, United States; 40°46′12″N 73°58′22″W

An outdoor bronze sculpture of Christopher Columbus by Jeronimo Suñol is installed in Central Park in Manhattan, New York.

== History ==
In 1892, the Statue of Christopher Columbus was donated to Central Park by the New York Genealogical and Biographical Society in commemoration of the 400th anniversary of his arrival in the Americas in the service of Spain. The statue replicates one made by Jeronimo Suñol in 1892, located at the Plaza de Colon, in Madrid. The New York version was placed in the park in 1894 at the foot of the Mall, and is today one of two monuments of Columbus found in the park's environs, the other being the statue surmounting the column at Columbus Circle. The sculpture depicts the explorer standing with outstretched arms, looking towards the heavens in gratitude for his successful voyage.

The statue was created to commemorate the 400th anniversary, in 1892, of Columbus's arrival in the Americas. It was unveiled in Central Park on May 12, 1894.

In August 2017, the statue was vandalized with red paint and graffiti reading "Hate will not be tolerated" and '#somethingscoming". The statue was restored shortly thereafter. The statue was vandalized again in February 2023 with red paint and graffiti reading "land back" and "murderer".

== See also ==
- 1892 in art
- List of monuments and memorials to Christopher Columbus
- Monument to Columbus (Madrid)
