= Maruja Callaved =

Spanish television presenter and director (1928–2018)

- Born: Maruja Callaved Gastón; 1928; Jaca, Spain
- Died: 9 January 2018 (aged 89); Madrid, Spain
- Education: University of Zaragoza
- Occupations: Journalist, TV director, presenter
- Employers: Televisión Española; RTVE
- Spouse: Antonio Mejía
- Awards: Antena de Oro (1963); Ondas Award (1977)

Maruja Callaved Gastón (1928 – 9 January 2018) was a Spanish television presenter and director.

== Biography ==
After settling in Zaragoza, Maruja Callaved studied Philosophy and Literature and graduated in Teaching.

Her professional beginnings were in radio, first at the University of Zaragoza and later at La Voz de Madrid, although she developed almost all of her professional career at Televisión Española, first as a presenter and later as a director.

She started as an announcer on Club del sábado. Subsequently, she was on Panorama de actualidad, with began her association with news services. In the mid-1960s she presented Telediario. In 1963 she received the Antena de Oro for her work in television.

Callaved's popularity increased with Vamos a la mesa (1967–68), a gastronomy and home economics magazine predecessor of the cooking shows that would triumph decades later, such as Elena Santonja's Con las manos en la masa and El menú de Karlos Arguiñano. A year later she presented Nivel de Vida, together with Blanca Álvarez.

In the 1970s she got behind the camera and went on to direct, finding success with programs like Aquí y Ahora (1975) with José Luis Uribarri, and Gente hoy (1976–1981), a famous talk show that earned her the 1977 Ondas Award, and that launched the careers of presenters Isabel Tenaille and Mari Cruz Soriano.

In 2017, Callaved received a heartfelt tribute in Huesca, at the 1st Product and Gastronomy Congress of the Pyrenees. This was one of her last public appearances, at which she emotionally pointed out, "It is important for me and, from now on, in all the moments of my life. And what's more to do it in Huesca, that is my land and that allows me to speak with heart in hand."
