= Mari Cruz Soriano =

Spanish journalist

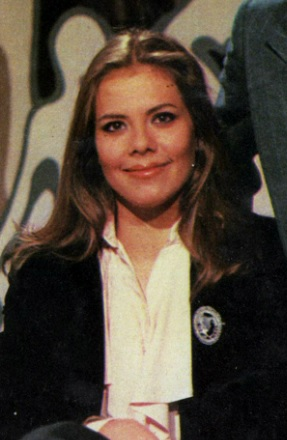
- Born: Mari Cruz Soriano Roales; 23 August 1955 (age 70); Portugalete, Spain
- Occupation(s): Presenter, entrepreneur, journalist, pianist
- Spouses: José Luis Tirado Doñate; Juan Alberto Belloch (2002–present)
- Awards: TP de Oro (1979)
- Presenting career
- Show: Gente hoy
- Station: Televisión Española

Mari Cruz Soriano Roales (born 23 August 1955) is a Spanish entrepreneur, journalist, pianist, and radio and television presenter.

== Biography ==
The first years of Mari Cruz Soriano's childhood were spent in the Navarrese town of Lesaka. She began her studies at the Colegio de Santa Ana and continued them at the Jesuitinas of Bilbao.

When she was seventeen, she began working as a radio announcer at Cadena COPE in Bilbao. From there she went, in 1973, to the Territorial Center of Televisión Española (TVE), Telenorte, where she was entrusted with the presentation of the news. National fame came to her very young when, in 1977, Maruja Callaved chose her to replace Isabel Tenaille on the live interview magazine program she directed, called Gente hoy. Mari Cruz Soriano remained in this position until 1981. Among the awards she received was the 1979 TP de Oro for Best Presenter.

She presented, together with Miguel de los Santos, the OTI Festival 1977. She also presented the Spanish entry at the Eurovision Song Contest 1980 from The Hague, which was "Quédate esta noche" performed by Trigo Limpio. That same year, she presented the TVE end-of-year special variety show. And in 1981, she presented the Benidorm Song Festival. But the most multitudinous television festival that she would present would be that of Hispanidad Day, broadcast live from Madison Square Garden in New York, and aimed at a potential audience of 500 million.

Soriano's album Caja de Música (Hispavox, 1979), played on the piano, reached the top sales positions in countries as diverse as Argentina and the former Czechoslovakia. Two piano performances, "A mis pocos años" and "Canción para mi tristeza", were the instrumental themes of a 1980s Argentine telenovela, Señorita Andrea, starring the popular actress Andrea Del Boca.

Later, she was offered the presentation of a nightly television program called Blanco y negro (1981), in which she had the opportunity to show her skills as a pianist. This show was followed by another called Así como suena (1982).

In the following years she dedicated herself to the development of business activities out of the public eye, such as the promotion of company cruises, until 1996. After the death of announcer Encarna Sánchez, she was hired by the radio station COPE to host the program La Tarde, which she led until 1998. In an interview on this program she met the politician Juan Alberto Belloch, former Interior and Justice minister, and future mayor of Zaragoza, whom she would end up marrying on 19 December 2002. She again retired from public life until 14 April 2012, when she reappeared in a television interview.

After her stint on La Tarde, she would focus on the business world, where for 25 years she has worked with companies in Spain and France, such as El Corte Inglés, L'Oréal, as well as institutions such as Autonomous Communities and the Ministry of Environment. She has focused her professional activity in the field of exports, through the promotion of Spanish agri-food products in the United Kingdom and Germany.

== Popularity ==
Such was Soriano's popularity index, during the 1970s and early 80s, that even the prominent Galician rock band Siniestro Total, founded in 1981, referenced her in one of their original names: "Mari Cruz Soriano y los que afinan su piano" (Mari Cruz Soriano and Her Piano Tuners).

== Personal life ==
In 1978 she married José Luis Tirado Doñate, a banker, with whom she had two daughters. Years later the couple divorced. And later, in 2002, she remarried to the politician Juan Alberto Belloch.

In 2017 Soriano was sentenced to 18 months in jail, pending appeal, for the construction of a chalet on undeveloped land in the Province of Tarragona.
