= Jeronimo Suñol =

Spanish sculptor

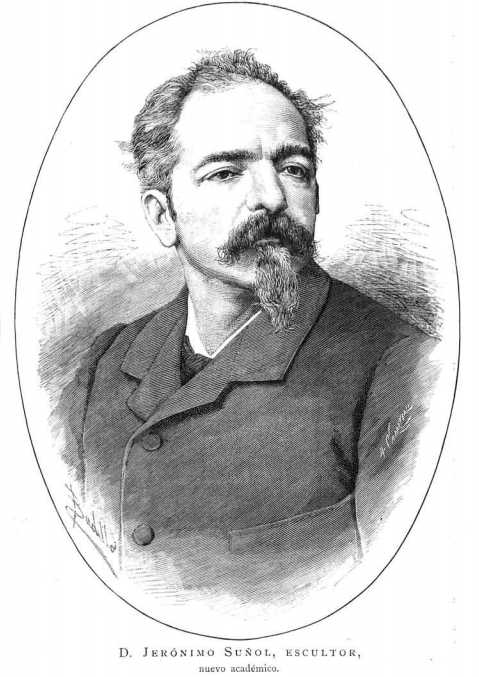
Jeronimo Suñol, La Ilustración Española y Americana, 22 June 1882

Jeronimo Suñol y Pujol (13 December 1839–16 October 1902) was a Spanish sculptor born in Barcelona. His early training was in the atelier of Agapit and Venanci Vallmitjana, perfecting his art at Rome where he maintained a studio for many years. Never prolific, he was among the front rank of Spanish sculptors of his generation, moving sculpture by his example away from neoclassical abstractions towards realistic depictions. He died in Madrid.

== Major works ==
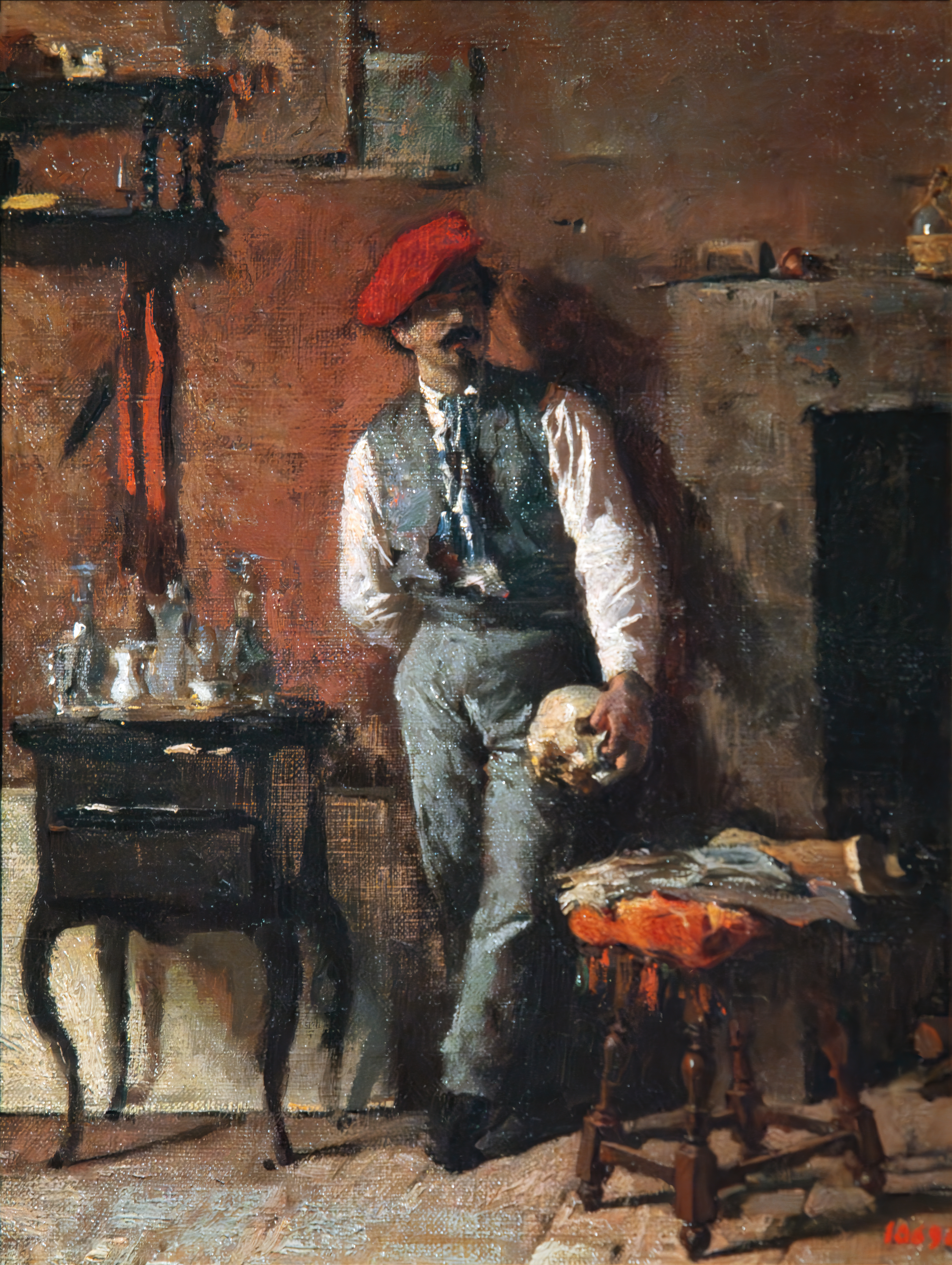
Portrait of Jeroni Suñol (c. 1864) by Marià Fortuny

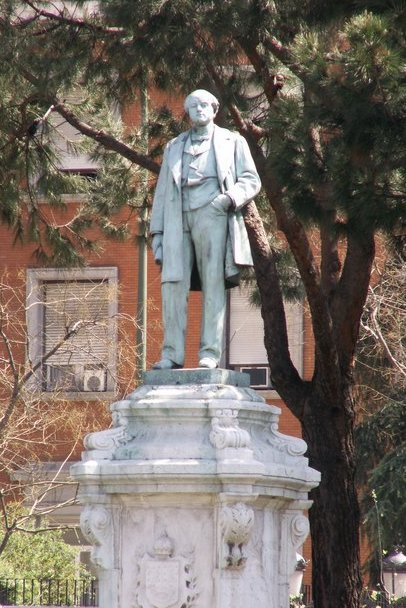
Marqués de Salamanca, Madrid, 1902

- Dante (1864). The major work that established his reputation shows the poet seated, lost in thought. The full-sized plaster model received a second-class medal at the exposition of 1864 in Madrid. Suñol showed it in Paris in 1869 and kept a marble in his studio in Rome, where he repeated it for several collectors. It was cast in bronze for Barcelona in 1901.
- Himeneo (1866). A nude of Hymenaeus, the god of weddings.
- Petrarca (1867)
- O'Donnell Monument (1870). The funeral monument of General Leopoldo O'Donnell y Joris, Count of Lucena and Duque of Tetuan in the Convent of the Salesas Reales.
- Alvarez de Castro Monument (1880). The funeral monument of General Mariano Álvarez de Castro.
- Statue of the Columbus monument (1886). A 1892 replica is in Central Park, New York.
- Saint Peter and Saint Paul in the Basilica of San Francisco el Grande in Madrid.
- Marqués de Salamanca (1902). An informal portrait of uncompromising realism, for a public monument. Suñol's last work, it is in the Plaza del Marqués de Salamanca, Madrid.
