= Trigo Limpio =

Spanish music group

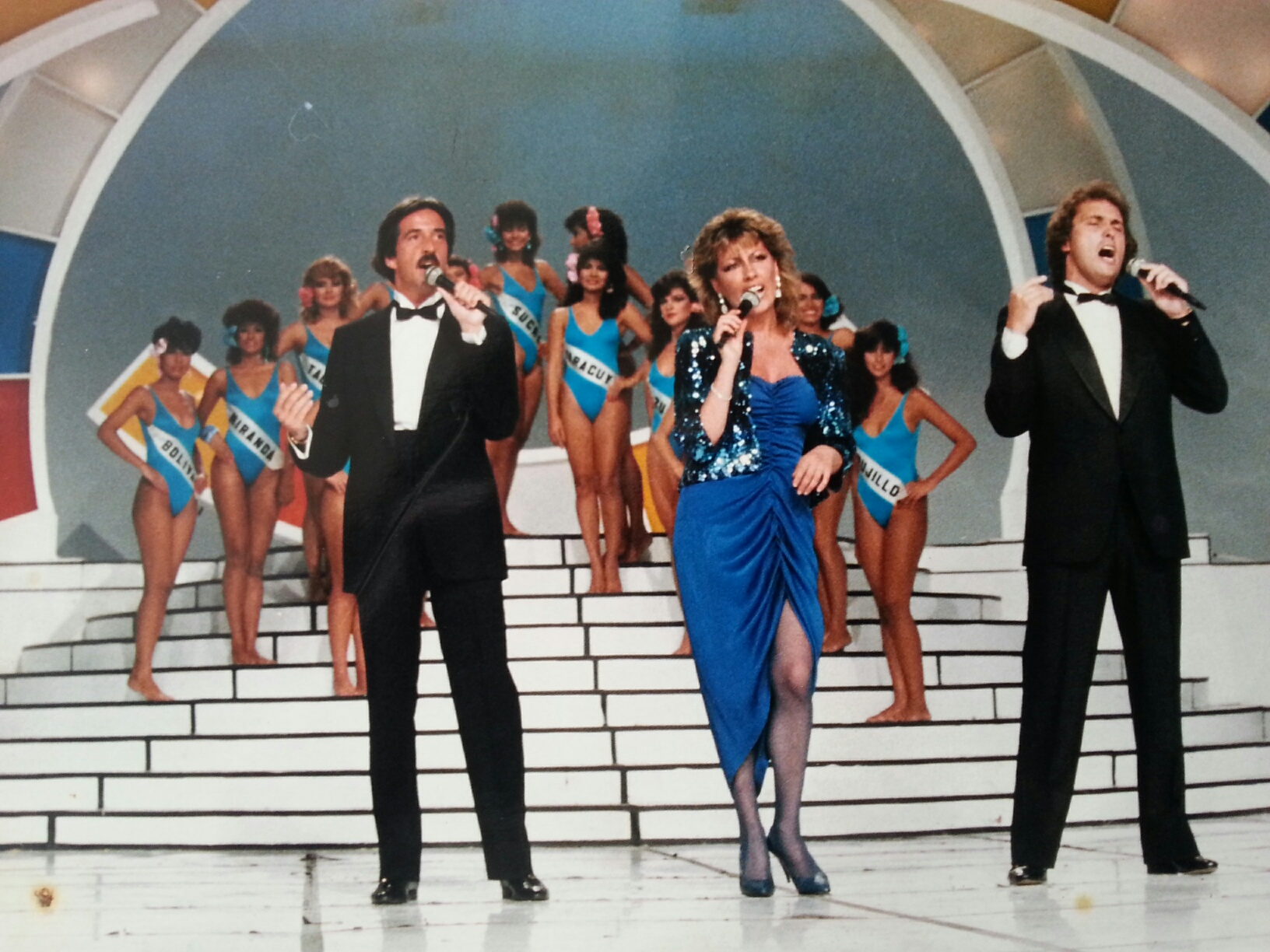
- Trigo Limpio (from left to right): Luis Carlos Gil, Patricia Fernández and Iñaki de Pablo

Background information
- Origin: San Sebastián (Gipuzkoa), Spain
- Years active: 1975–1990
- Members: Amaya Saizar; Iñaki de Pablo; Luis Carlos Gil; Patricia_Fernández_Goberna

Trigo Limpio (Spanish pronunciation: [ˈtɾiɣo ˈlimpjo]) were a Spanish musical trio popular in Spain in the 1970s and 1980s. It was originally formed by Amaya Saizar, Iñaki de Pablo and Luis Carlos Gil. In Spanish, the expression literally means clean wheat, figuratively someone who is honest and transparent.

The band represented Televisión Española in the sixth edition of the OTI Festival 1977 with the song "Rómpeme, mátame" getting the fourth place. Three years later, they represented Spain in the Eurovision Song Contest 1980 with the entry "Quédate esta noche". By the time of their Eurovision participation, Amaya Saizar had been replaced by Patricia Fernández.

Patricia Fernández died on 27 September 2016, at the age of 62. Luis Carlos Gil died on 11 November 2023, at the age of 72.

== Discography ==
- 1976 Trigo Limpio
- 1978 Desde nuestro rincón
- 1980 Caminando
- 1981 Te quiero para mí
- 1983 Como un sueño
- 1984 Hay cariño
- 1995 Trigo Limpio: Grandes éxitos (1976–1986)

Preceded by María Ostiz with "Canta cigarra"	Spain in the OTI Festival; 1977	Succeeded by José María Purón with "Mi sitio"
Preceded by Betty Missiego with "Su canción"	Spain in the Eurovision Song Contest; 1980	Succeeded by Bacchelli with "Y sólo tú"
