= Jardines del Descubrimiento =

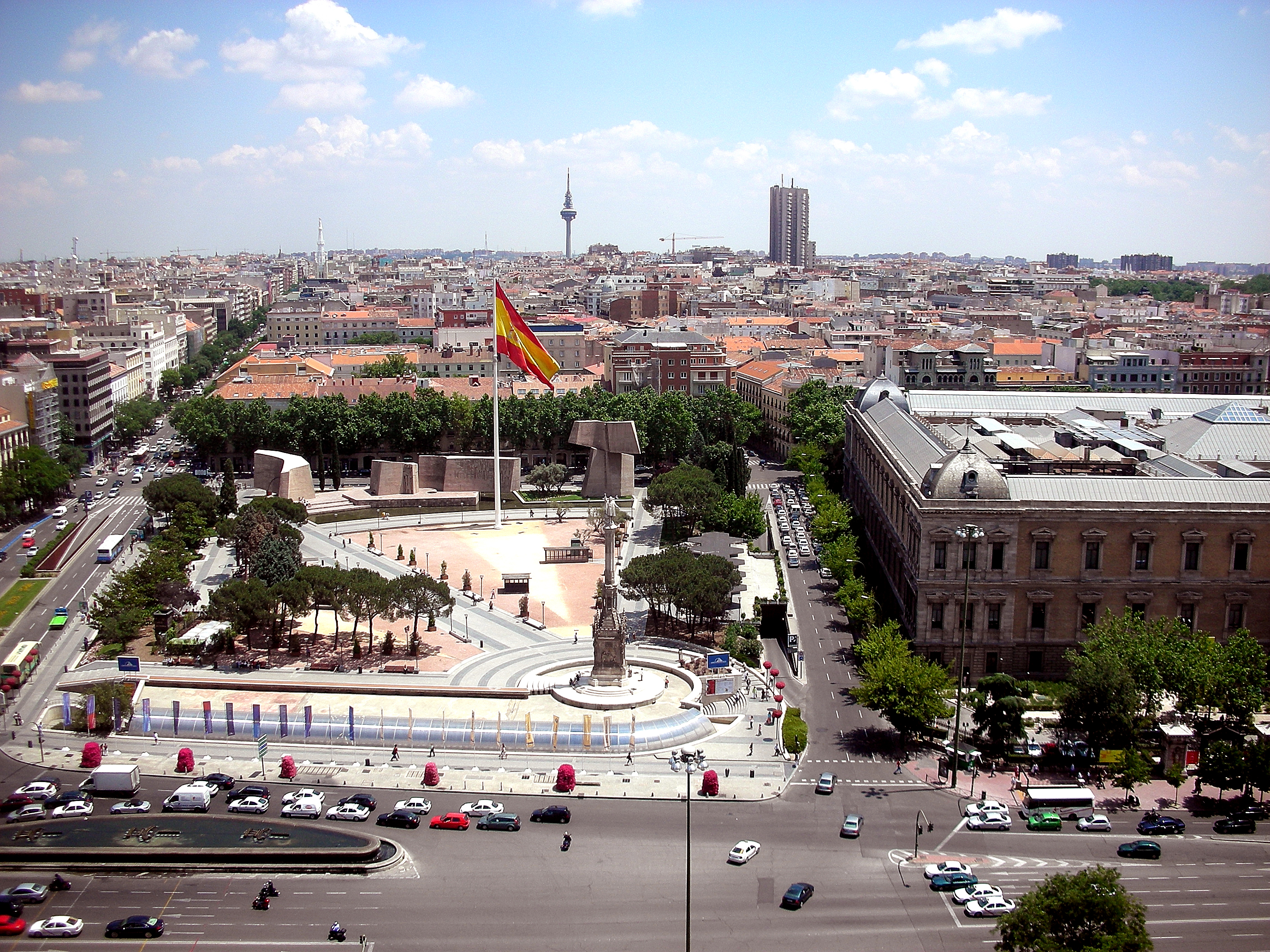
- Aerial view of Plaza de Colón, with the gardens
- Interactive map of Jardines del Descubrimiento
- Type: Public Park
- Location: Madrid, Spain
- Coordinates: 40.42469°N 3.68836°W
- Area: 1.87 hectares (4.6 acres)
- Created: 1970
- Website: www.esmadrid.com/en/tourist-information/jardines-descubrimiento

Jardines del Descubrimiento (translated into English as Gardens of Discovery) is a park in the Spanish city of Madrid, located next to the Plaza de Colón. Dedicated to the discovery of America (the first contact between Europeans and native peoples of the Americas, in 1492), it has a monument in their eastern sector, as well as a mast with a Spanish flag.

== Description ==
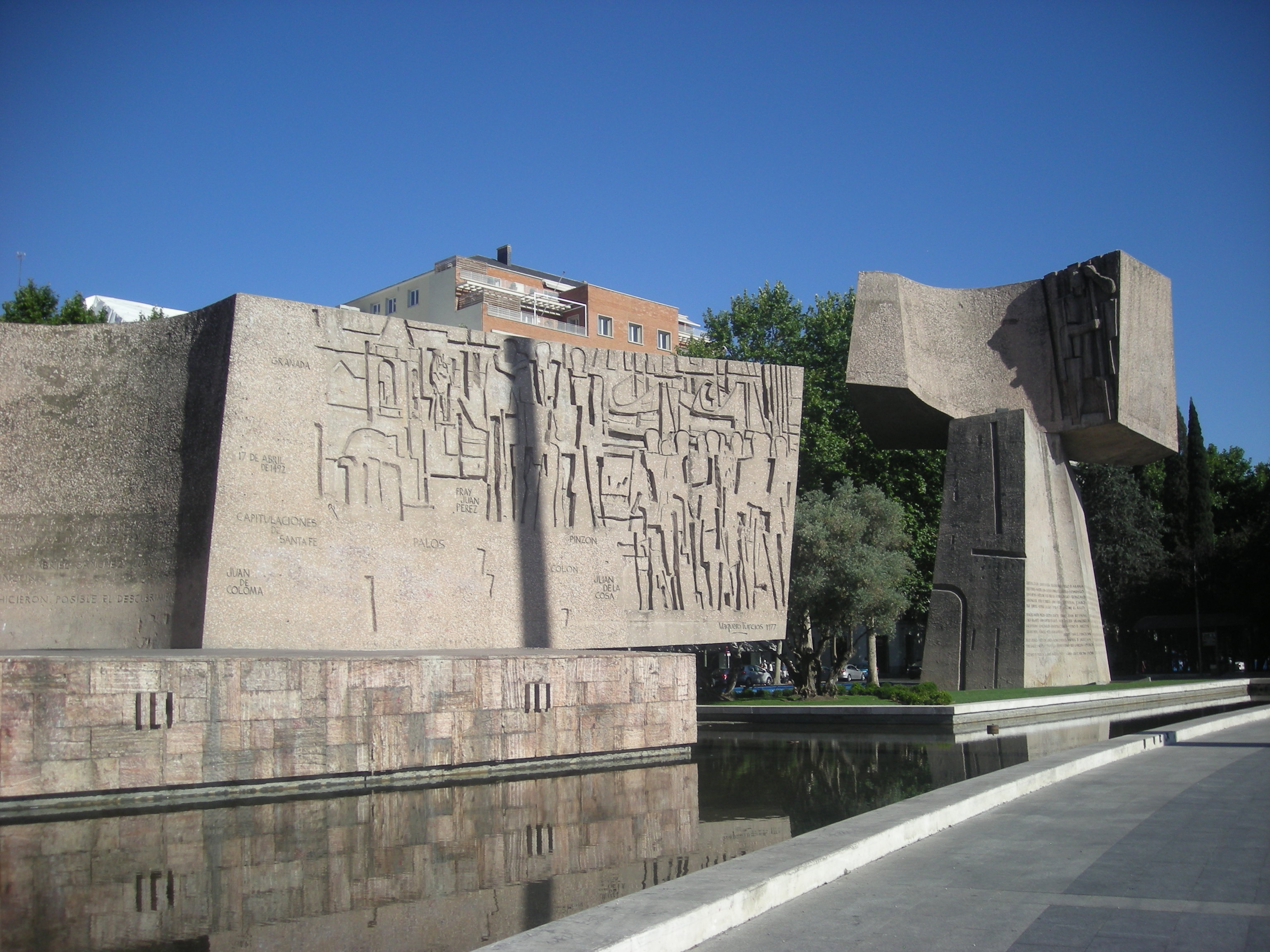
Part of the monument to the Discovery of America

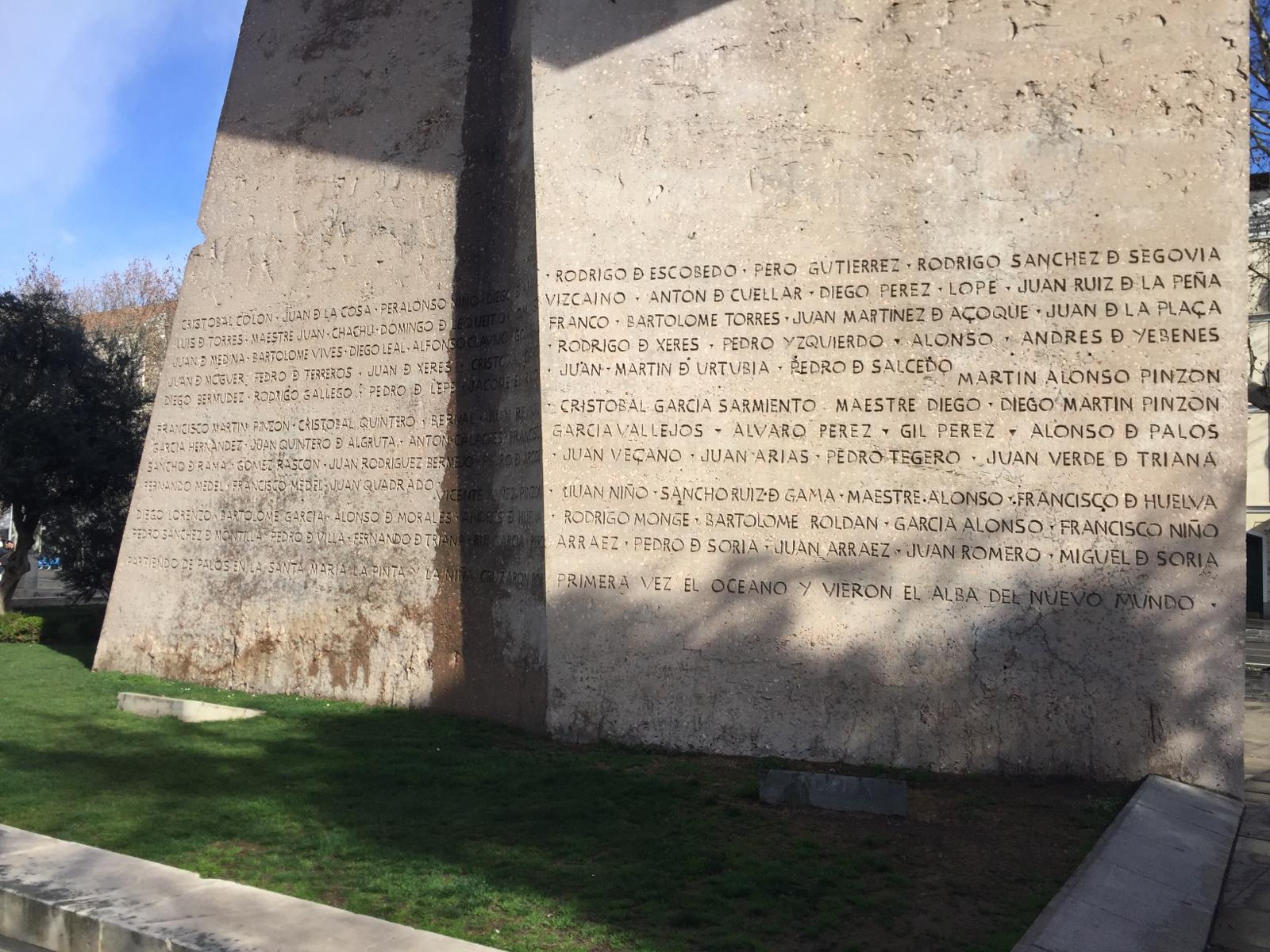
Detail from the monument

Occupying an area of 1.87 hectares, the park is delimited by the streets of Goya, Armada Española, Serrano and Paseo de la Castellana. The park, dedicated to the discovery of America, was inaugurated in 1977, as part of the remodeling works of the Plaza de Colón. The park was built on a site that was occupied by the old building of the Mint, which was demolished in 1970. Much of its surface serves as a roof for the Fernán Gómez Theatre, built underground, as well as a parking lot, also underground.

The gardens have a quadrangular plan, divided into two large triangular-shaped sectors, between which a main promenade extends diagonally distributed. They are made up of several wooded areas (olive trees, cedars and pines) and, initially, grass meadows, replaced in August 2006 by ornamental gravel, as a measure taken by the City Council of Madrid to save water and prevent leaks that occurred on the Cultural Center of the Town of Madrid (currently known as Fernán Gómez Theatre).

Its main artistic value is found in the monument to the Discovery of America, whose author is Joaquín Vaquero Turcios, on its eastern side. Erected in 1977, the monument is made up of 3 large concrete volumes with reliefs alluding to the aforementioned historical event. It's erected on a pond.

The park houses a 50 metres (160 ft) high mast on which flies a 14 metres (46 ft) x 21 metres (69 ft) flag of Spain made of polyester. A rotating head allows the flag to change its orientation depending on the direction of the wind.

== See also ==
- Monument to Columbus, located nearby
