= Plaza de Colón =

Square in Madrid, Spain

Coordinates: 40°25′30″N 3°41′25″W

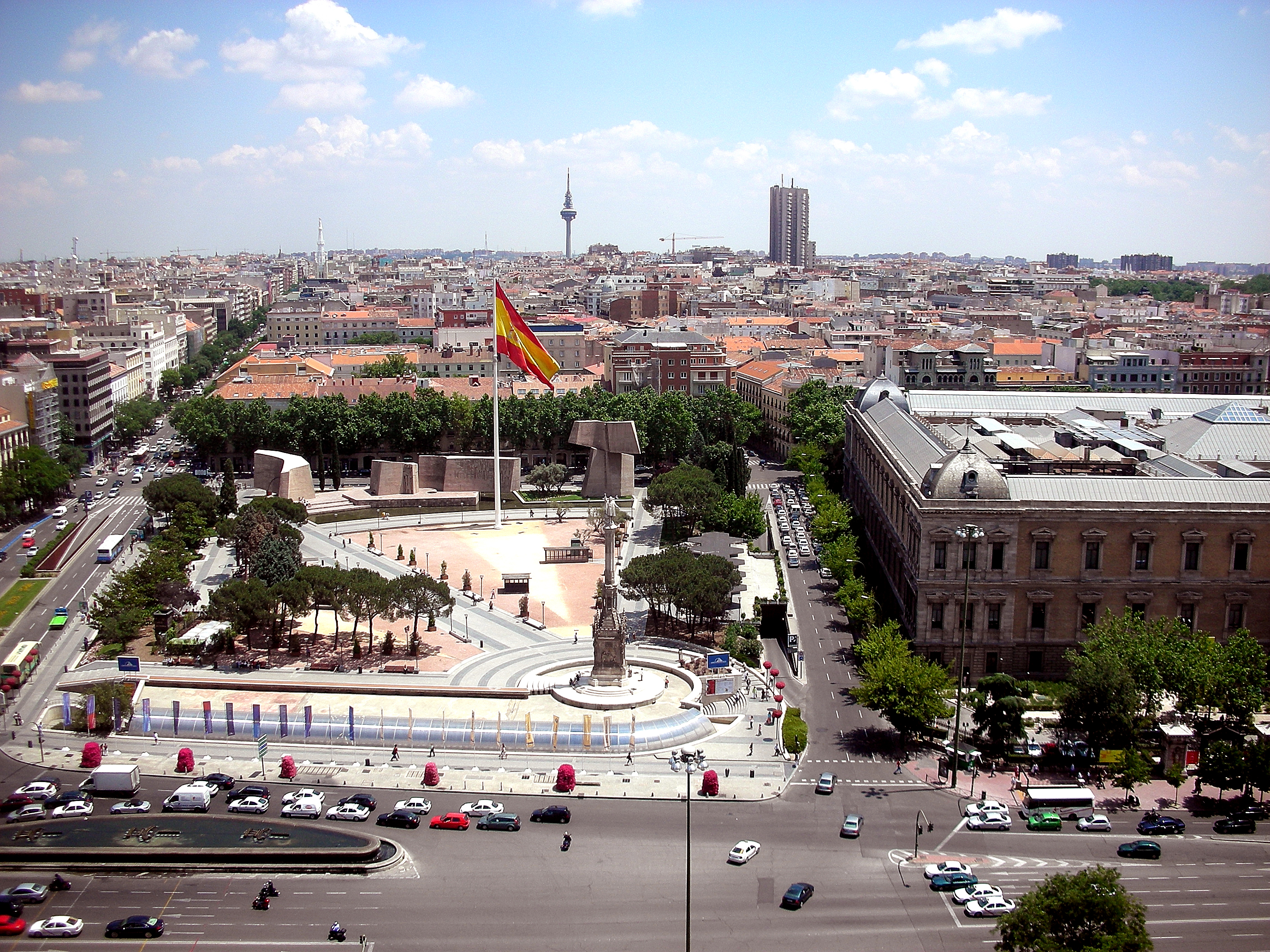
Plaza de Colón

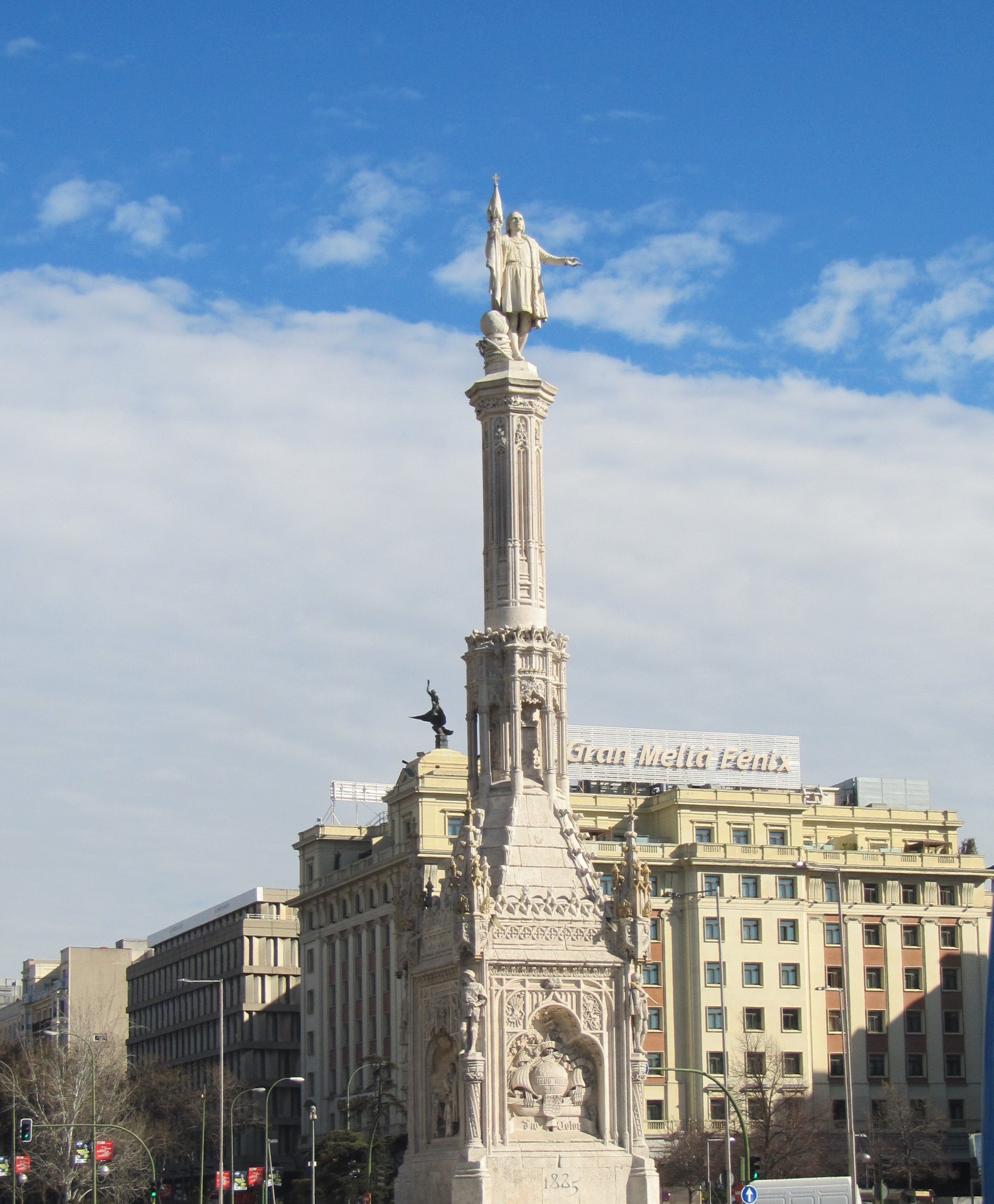
Monument to Columbus

Plaza de Colón (Spanish pronunciation: [ˈplaθa ðe koˈlon]; lit. 'Columbus Square') is located in the encounter of Chamberí, Centro and Salamanca districts of Madrid, Spain. This plaza and its fountain commemorate the explorer Christopher Columbus, whose name in Spanish was Cristóbal Colón, whose voyages to the Americas would lead to the creation of the Spanish Empire.

== Monuments ==
The plaza, originally called Plaza de Santiago (St. James Square), was renamed Plaza de Colón in 1893 to honor Christopher Columbus. The square contains two monuments.

On the Paseo de la Castellana side there is a monument to Columbus whose base was constructed between 1881 and 1885. It is topped by a statue of Columbus. The monument is 3 meters tall.

The second monument near the Calle de Serrano consists of a group of concrete macro-sculptures by Joaquín Vaquero Turcios. The concrete blocks are decorated with inscriptions and reliefs related to the discovery of America.

== Flag ==
Since Spain's National Day in 2001, the world's largest Spanish flag—14m x 21m (46 x 69 ft.)—294 square meters (3164 square feet)—has flown from a flagpole in Plaza de Colón that is 50 m (164 ft.) high.

The flag originally cost €378,000. It was replaced in January, 2016 at a cost of €400,000.

== Other features ==
The gardens in the plaza are known as the Jardines del Descubrimiento (Gardens of Discovery), where the Royal Mint was located until 1970.

At the base of the Columbus monument is a large fountain with a broad cascade of water. There are steps leading under the cascade and beneath the plaza, where the roar of the fountain is amplified. Under the plaza along with the Teatro Fernán Gómez lies a stop for a special shuttle that takes passengers to Barajas Airport.

At the other side of the Plaza are the twin Torres de Colón. The Platea Madrid gourmet food hall is located on the square at Calle de Goya 5–7.
