= Monument to Columbus (Madrid) =

Spanish monument

- Monumento a Colón
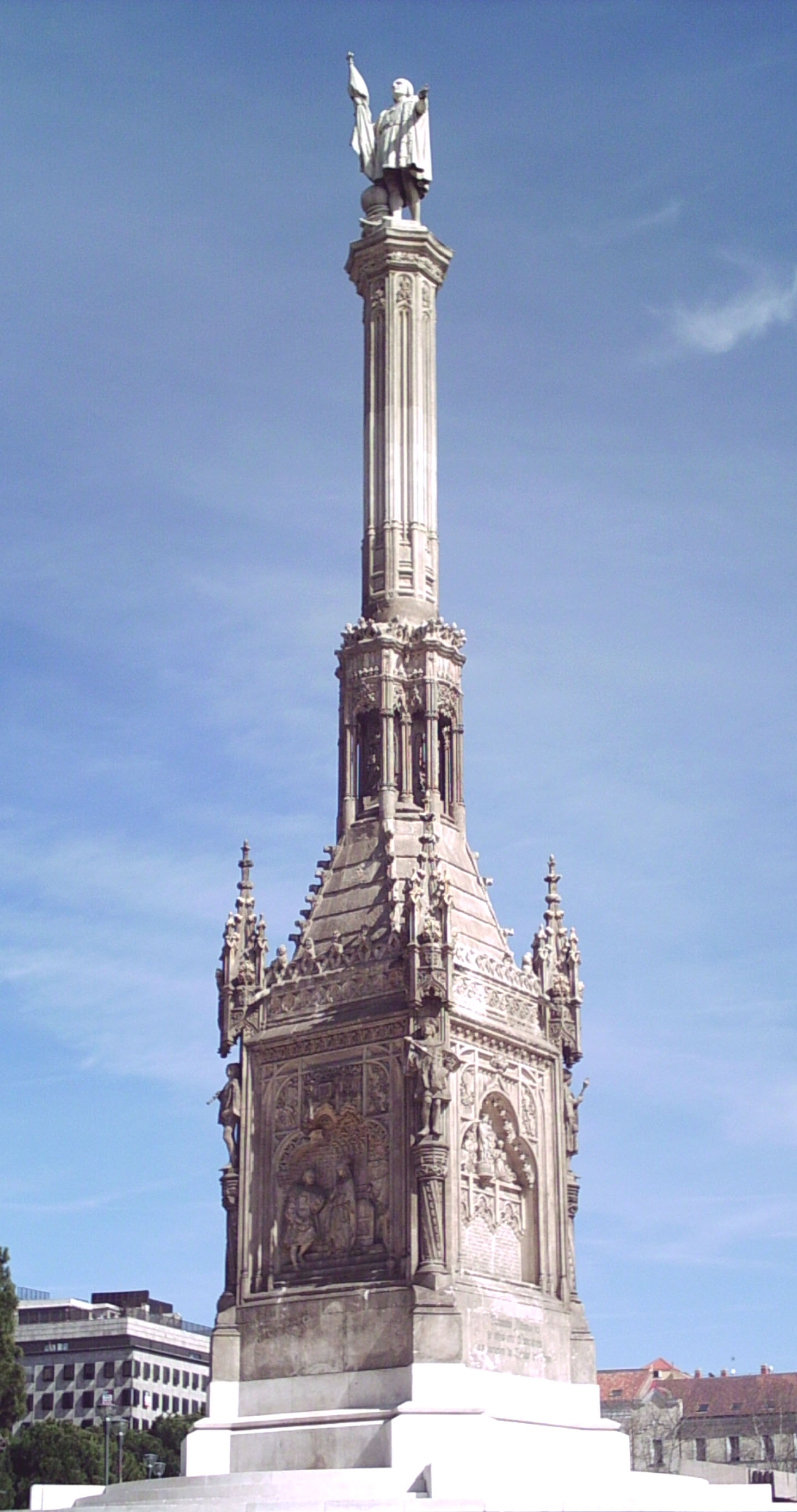
- Interactive map of Monument to Columbus
- Location: Plaza de Colón, Madrid, Spain
- Coordinates: 40.425207°N 3.690465°W
- Designer: Basement: Arturo Mélida; Statue: Jerónimo Suñol
- Height: Basement: 17 m Statue: 3.30 m
- Dedicated to: Christopher Columbus

The Monument to Columbus (Spanish: Monumento a Colón) is a monument in Madrid, Spain. It lies on the namesake square, the Plaza de Colón. The basement of the monument is a Gothic Revival work by Arturo Mélida, while the topping statue is a work by Jerónimo Suñol.

== History and description ==
Spanish Navy Capitán de navío (Ship-of-the-Line Captain) Miguel Lobo y Malagamba originated the idea of creating a Spanish national monument to commemorate Christopher Columbus, and between 1861 and 1863 he used proceeds from a book he published to open a national subscription campaign in Spain to raise the money to pay for it. In 1864 Queen Isabella II issued a royal decree authorizing the Spanish government and the Madrid City Council to erect the monument. The Glorious Revolution forced Isbaella II into exile in September 1868, aborting the project, although the money raised for it remained available.

In 1873, Lobo — by then a contralmirante (counter admiral) — revived the project, convincing the government of the First Spanish Republic to approve it and to donate surplus military bronze from the Ministry of War for its construction. In 1874 he convinced the government of Uruguay to donate native Uruguayan marble for the construction of the monument so that its pedestal literally would — as he saw it — "rest on American soil." Lobo died in 1876 without seeing construction of the monument begin.

In 1877, Spanish nobles again revived the monument project, encouraging public interest in it by deeming it a commemorative tribute in honor of the upcoming wedding of King Alfonso XII and María de las Mercedes in January 1878. A public contest for the monument's design took place in 1877, and the winner was Arturo Mélida. The nobles led another subscription effort between 1878 and 1881, and in 1881 Lobo's widow contributed 22,950 escudos Lobo had raised for it. Following the scrapping of an earlier draft of its design, the 17-metre (56-foot) tall pedestal was built between 1881 and 1885. Plans called for a dedication ceremony for the pedestal on 4 January 1886, but the death of Alfonso XII on 25 November 1885 resulted in the cancellation of the event.

The 3.30-metre (10.8-foot) tall statue, a work in Carrara marble by Jerónimo Suñol featuring Columbus holding a flag of Castile, was delivered to the Madrid City Council in 1892.

The monument was dismantled in 1976 and moved a year later to a nearby location in the Jardines del Descubrimiento. It returned to its original location in 2009, in the context of the renovation of the Prado–Recoletos axis.

== See also ==
- List of monuments and memorials to Christopher Columbus
