= Teatro Fernán Gómez =

Theatre in Madrid, Spain

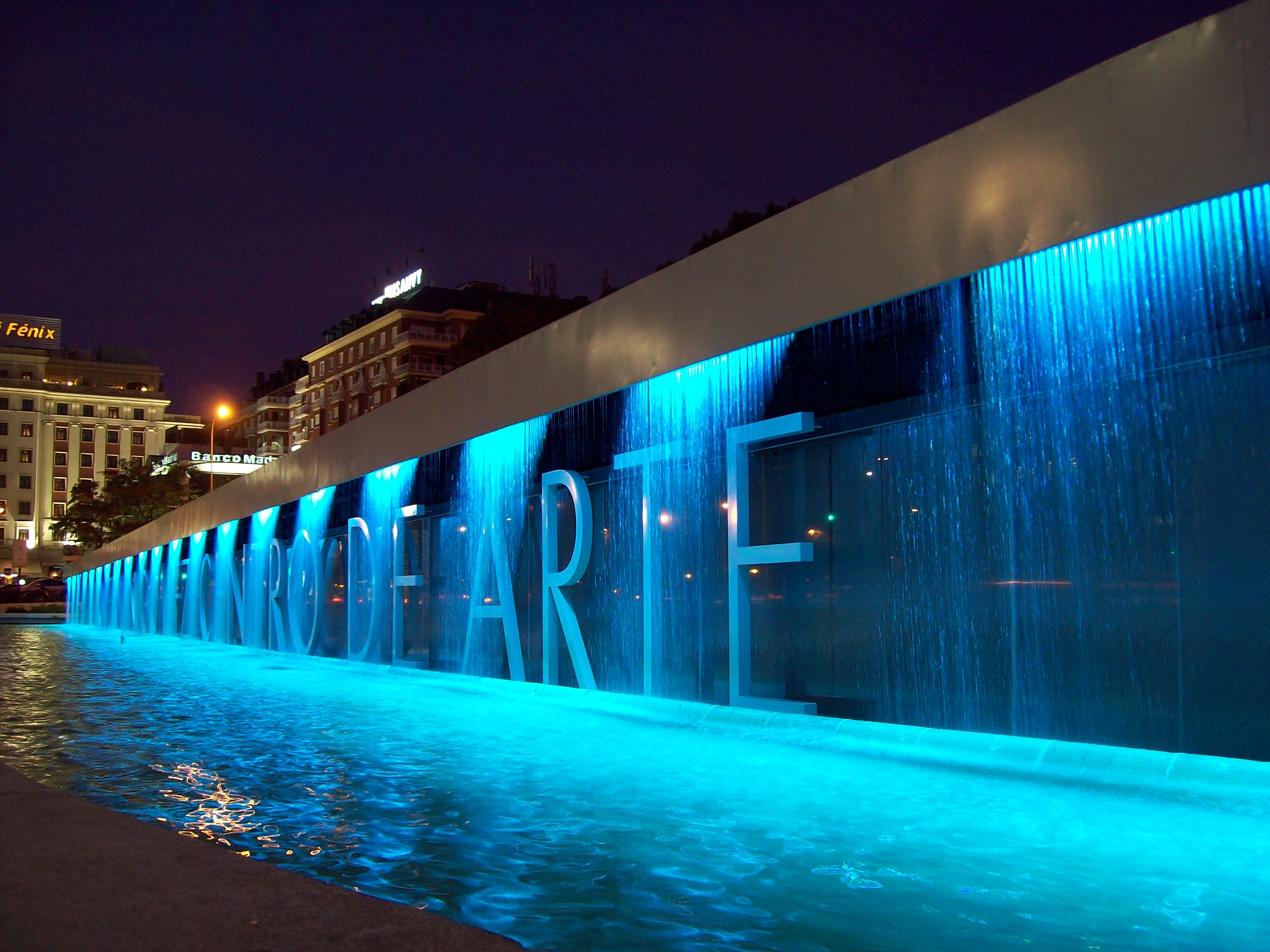
- Exterior view in 2011.
- Interactive map of Teatro Fernán Gómez
- Former names: Centro Cultural de la Villa de Madrid
- Address: Plaza de Colón 4
- Location: Madrid, Spain
- Coordinates: 40°25′30″N 3°41′22″W
- Capacity: Sala Guirau: 689; Sala Jardiel Poncela: 95–175
- Type: Public theatre
- Public transit: Colón

Construction
- Opened: 15 May 1977; 49 years ago
- Architect: Manuel Herrero Palacios

Website
- www.teatrofernangomez.es

The Teatro Fernán Gómez (previously Centro Cultural de la Villa de Madrid) is a theatre and cultural centre in Madrid, Spain.

== History ==
Located near the Plaza de Colón in the Jardines del Descubrimiento, the theatre was inaugurated on 15 May 1977. Since its early days, its programme has featured plays by both classical and contemporary authors, as well as other events such as concerts and exhibitions. One of its first major events was hosting the OTI Festival 1977.

In 2007, the theatre adopted the name of actor and author Fernando Fernán Gómez, who had died that year. In September 2013, the City Council of Madrid dismissed the director of the theatre and announced its intention to privatize its management, sparking outrage in the cultural world. The council eventually conceded.

== Structure ==
The theatre has three rooms. The main one, Sala Guirau, has a capacity for 682 people. The secondary Sala Jardiel Poncela (also known simply as Sala Dos) can accommodate up to 175 people. The third room is an exhibition hall (Sala de exposiciones) with a surface area of 2,000 square metres (22,000 ft^{2}).

== Other uses ==
The theatre has hosted funerals of celebrated artists on several occasions throughout the years, with those of Lola Flores (1995), Rocío Jurado (2006), and Tony Leblanc (2012) being notable examples.
