= Corazón de poeta =

1981 studio album by Jeanette

Studio album by Jeanette
- Released: June 1981
- Recorded: Early 1981
- Studio: Sonoland Studios, Madrid
- Genre: Canción melódica; pop
- Length: 39:58
- Language: Spanish
- Label: RCA Victor
- Producer: Manuel Alejandro

Jeanette chronology
Jeanette/Todo es nuevo (1977)	Corazón de poeta (1981)	Reluz (1983)

Singles from Corazón de poeta
- 1. "Frente a frente" Released: 1981; 2. "Corazón de poeta" Released: 1981; 3. "El muchacho de los ojos tristes" Released: 1982

Corazón de poeta (pronounced [koɾaˈθon de poˈeta]; Spanish for "Heart of a poet") is the fourth studio album by English-born Spanish singer Jeanette, released in June 1981 by RCA Victor. The album was almost entirely written and produced by composer Manuel Alejandro, who had written "Soy rebelde", Jeanette's 1971 breakthrough as a canción melódica singer. After releasing an LP record in France and an unsuccessful foray into disco in Germany, Corazón de poeta was Jeanette's return to fame, as well as to the soft, sentimental ballads she had been known for. Corazón de poeta intended to reinvent Jeanette's childlike image into a more mature one, reflected in its erotic tone and its promotional campaign.

Three singles were released from the album: the title track, "Frente a frente" and "El muchacho de los ojos tristes", with the former two becoming major hits and aiding Jeanette's resurgent popularity and success. Jeanette's best-selling album to date, Corazón de poeta was met with instant commercial success upon its release, performing well in Spain—where it received a double Gold certification—as well as Latin America—where virtually every track on the album was met with success and popularity. It remains Jeanette's most acclaimed release, and is considered by Jeanette herself as her best work. Various tracks from Corazón de poeta are among Jeanette's most famous popular songs, and several of them have been covered by various other artists.

== Background and production ==
"They say that he works for money or for fondness; I think with me he has done it for fondness, because on other occasions he has been offered millions and not accepted. He is a person who chooses his artists; he has a lot of character."

– Jeanette talking about composer Manuel Alejandro, El Periódico de Catalunya, June 1981.

Jeanette had previously worked with Corazon de poeta's composer Manuel Alejandro in her solo debut single "Soy rebelde", released in 1971 on Hispavox. The orchestral song was a departure from the folk rock-influenced style of her previous group Pic-Nic, and established Jeanette as an internationally renowned melodic singer. After the European success of her hit single "Porque te vas"—popularized by its inclusion in the 1976 film Cría cuervos—Jeanette found herself working mostly abroad. Moving away from her career in Spain, the subsequent years she recorded an LP record in France with André Popp, as well as various singles for Germany and the Netherlands. The latter attempted to reinvent Jeanette as a disco singer, something she disliked and later criticized. In a 1981 interview on talk show Retrato en vivo, Jeanette stated: "They wanted to change my image, what I really am. Because the people here in Spain know me as a singer of melodic, soft songs... [...] And I really did not like it very much, and left it.

Jeanette then decided to refocus on the Spanish career she had put on rest, signing a new contract with RCA Victor. She stated: "my illusion was to record an album with Manuel Alejandro, which would ultimately mean returning to my roots, to do what I have always done." He took a year and a half to compose the songs, which he later played in his piano to Jeanette. She recalled: "I liked them all. But with him you can not say much because he sends you out. He tells me: 'You're going to sing this because I say so'." Corazón de poeta was recorded in early 1981 at Sonoland Studios, Madrid. According to Jeanette, the sessions took a month and featured sixty session musicians in the studio, "without sophisticated machines or anything". Regarding his experience working with Jeanette, Alejandro recalled in 1999: "She had the tiniest voice I've ever heard in my life. They had to record the vocals twice on two tracks. But it was incredible."

== Composition ==
"Corazón de poeta"
Sample of the album's title track.

Corazón de poeta was Jeanette's return to the soft and melodic sentimental ballad-led style she had been famous for during the 1970s. In a 1981 interview with Heraldo de Aragón, Jeanette explained: "... it can be said that [on the album] there is a bit of everything, although what predominates are the soft songs, which is my usual style and where I am most comfortable." Unlike her previous works, however, the album presented a more erotic tone and less naive lyrics, that corresponded to a more mature woman. The organizers of Festival Europa Sur stated in 2014 that with tracks like "Corazón de poeta" and "Frente a frente", Jeanette "demonstrated that a canción melódica song can be approached from a pop optic".

Alejandro wrote all the songs with Jeanette's voice in mind and even included a paso doble—"Viva el pasodoble"—because he felt it would be "funny" to combine her characteristic English accent and thin voice with the Spanish folk music genre. The singer initially refused to record it but eventually agreed at Alejandro's insistence. However, she mentioned it in 2012 as "one of her songs that she has come to hate" alongside "Voy a tener un niño"; and refuses to perform it live, stating that she "does not feel comfortable" doing so. The lyrics of "Frente a frente" have been referred to as "a slow story of disagreement". Jeanette described it in 1981 as "very current", as it "touches on a burning issue that is divorce." (Note: On 7 July 1981—around the time of Corazón de poeta's release—Spain enacted its divorce law.) "El muchacho de los ojos tristes" has been likened to French chanson due to its instrumentation and melody.

== Release and promotion ==
Corazón de poeta was released in June 1981 on RCA Victor as a cassette and LP record. In addition to Spain, RCA Victor was responsible for the album's release in Peru, Venezuela, Bolivia, Mexico, Ecuador, and the United States. In France, Corazón de poeta was issued on Barclay Records. In 1988, RCA reissued the album in the United States as a CD. The tracks "Corazón de poeta" and "Frente a frente"—with "Comiénzame a vivir" and "Cuando estoy con él" as their respective B-sides—were "almost simultaneously" released as 7-inch singles in 1981. Both songs were also recorded in English—"Frente a frente" as "Sorrow" and "Corazón de poeta" as "A Heart So Warm and So Tender"—and released as a single that year. "El muchacho de los ojos tristes"—backed by "Toda la noche oliendo a tí"—was released as the album's third and final single in 1982.

Jeanette promoted the album extensively throughout Spain, making appearances across radio, television and newspapers. In August 1981, she appeared as a "guest of honor" on TV show Retrato en vivo, where she performed "Toda la noche oliendo a tí", "Acabaré llorando" and "Frente a frente". In her interviews, the singer emphasized her wish to be seen as a more mature woman and leave behind the childlike image people had of her. In 2016, she recalled:

I remember that time because I find it very funny. When I started to record the album Corazón de poeta, production told me that it was time to become a woman and leave the childish side that everyone knew. I laughed so much when they said my voice was sexy [laughs]. In the cover photo I appear with flying hair, bare shoulders... They made me a woman!

In July 1998, BMG released the albums Corazón de poeta and Ojos en el sol together as one compilation. Record label Rama Lama Music released in 2003 a remastered compilation of the three albums Jeanette recorded for RCA Victor. The songs from Corazón de poeta have appeared in several greatest hits albums by Jeanette, such as Grandes éxitos (1987), Sus más lindas canciones (1988), Sigo rebelde (1996), and 20 éxitos originales (2005).

== Reception ==
Professional ratings
Review scores
Source	Rating
AllMusic	3/5 stars
Lafonoteca	3.5/5 stars

Corazón de poeta was a commercial success in Spain and Ibero-American countries such as Argentina and Chile (where it became number one on the album charts), Mexico, Colombia, Venezuela and Brazil. In Spain, the album spent a week at the top of the album charts. On 19 October 1981, Promusicae awarded Corazón de poeta the Gold certification at nightclub Long Play, in recognition of having sold 100,000 copies. The album was later certified double Gold in Spain in early 1982. ABC reported in July 1982 that the album had sold around 200,000 copies. Corazón de poeta continued to sell for several years, eventually becoming Jeanette's best selling album in Spain and South America. According to Lafonoteca, "it harvested millionaire sales around the world, triumphing across the line in several Hispanic American countries."

Although the title track was intended to be the album's main single, it was "totally obscured" by "Frente a frente", which "sold quite more" and was able to "collect the dividends that its matrix LP was producing in the [album] market". According to Lafonoteca's Julián Molero, it "obtained a surely unexpected success at the beginning of its publication and became one of the most representative titles of Jeanette's career." In early 1982, ABC stated that "the song "Corazón de poeta" [had returned] Jeanette to the forefront of musical news in Ibero-America", with both the title track and "Frente a frente" appearing on Spain's singles chart. "El muchacho de los ojos tristes", the album's final single, failed to perform as well as the previous singles, as by that time its tracks were already well-known. Instead, it "fulfilled the objective of keeping in limelight the name of the singer on hold for the news that would occur the following year."

Corazón de poeta remains Jeanette's "most revered work". Critic Julián Molero felt that the album was "impeccable in its production and interpretation" and that "in its style it is among the best of those years." He further wrote: "If you allow me one last reflection of personal nature, I must say that this is not the kind of music I like, but it is evident that it is a very, very well done album. One of those records that you can not put a formal 'but', where nothing is unnecessary or a free whim. It is not surprising that it has been republished since the date of its publication."

== Legacy ==
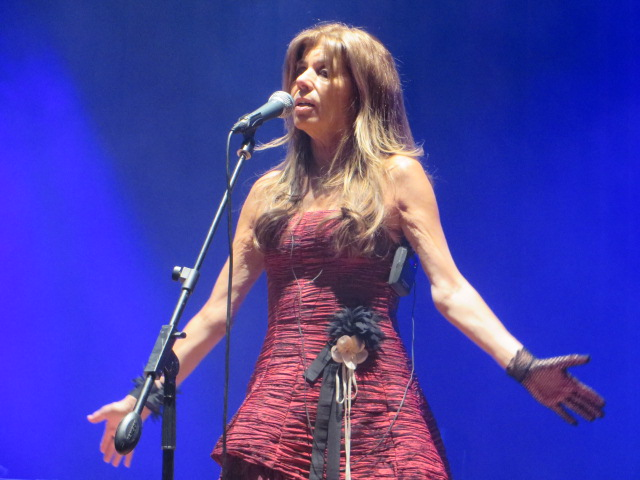
Jeanette performing "Frente a frente" in Arequipa, Peru in 2014.

Over time, songs like "Corazón de poeta", "Frente a frente" and "El muchacho de los ojos tristes" have come to be considered classics, and gained cult status. During an interview for home video series Las canciones de tu vida in 2008, host José María Íñigo asked Jeanette what Corazón de poeta meant in her discography, to which she replied: "That was the best LP I ever recorded in my life. Look at the curiosity that the twelve [sic] tracks of the record were number one in many countries of South America. It's not like today that they make you a CD and there are two or three songs that are worth, and the rest is more or less. Here were twelve wonderful tracks." Julián Molero described it as "her most famous album whose songs thirty years later continue to sound in the musical thread of the big surfaces and some stations specialized in retromusic that serve as background to any work activity."

The songs from Corazon de poeta have been extensively covered by other artists. Rocío Jurado famously covered "Viva el pasodoble", which became her most known song and led many people to believe she was its original singer. Spanish singer-songwriter Enrique Bunbury is an andmirer of "Frente a frente", and included a cover version of the song, featuring Miren Iza, in his album Las Consecuencias. It was released as the album's lead single in January 2010, and its music video featured a cameo appearance by Jeanette. Mariana Montenegro of Chilean band Dënver covered "Corazón de poeta" in 2013. Por Qué Jeanette, a Spanish post-punk tribute band focusing on the singer, have released several reinterpretations of songs off Corazón de poeta, including the title track, "Cuando estoy con él", "Toda la noche oliendo a tí", "Acabaré llorando", "Un día es un día", "Comiénzame a vivir" and "Frente a frente". In October 2015, Peruvian label Plastilina Records released the double album Contemplaciones. Homenaje iberoamericano a Jeanette, in which several artists from Spain and Ibero-America paid homage to the singer. It includes cover versions of "Si te vas, te vas" by Chico Unicornio, "Corazón de poeta" by Carmen Sandiego, "El muchacho de los ojos tristes" by Niza, "Cuando estoy con él" by Sexores and "Frente a frente" by Los Waldners. In 2016, Jeanette re-recorded "Toda la noche oliendo a tí" alongside fellow ballad singer Juan Bau, which was released as a single on Regalia Records.

The song "Frente a frente" has been sampled in several hip-hop tracks, including Noreaga's "Gangsta's Watch", Cookin' Soul's remix of "Threat" by Jay-Z, Cartel de Santa's "El dolor del micro", Facção Central's "A malandragem toma conta (Releitura)", and The Louk's "Ritmos & Letras". Chicano rapper Conejo sampled "Corazón de poeta" in "Coins Like Judas", a song off his 2014 album Favela Tres.

In 2025, the track "El muchacho de los ojos tristes" was prominently interpolated in Selena Gomez, Benny Blanco, and the Marías' "Ojos Tristes", which became a number-one Latin radio hit in the United States.

== Track listing ==
All tracks are written by Manuel Alejandro and Ana Magdalena, (Note: Ana Magdalena is the pseudonym of Purificación Casas Romero, Manuel Alejandro's wife. According to Libertad Digital, Alejandro used to sign with her "for reasons of rights before the Treasury".) except where noted

Side one
No.	Title	Length
1.	"Corazón de poeta"	4:35
2.	"Un día es un día"	3:47
3.	"Cuando estoy con él"	4:18
4.	"Frente a frente"	3:19
5.	"Viva el pasodoble"	4:05

Side two
No.	Title	Length
1.	"El muchacho de los ojos tristes"	3:38
2.	"Comiénzame a vivir"	4:00
3.	"Si te vas, te vas"	4:06
4.	"Toda la noche oliendo a tí"	3:47
5.	"Acabaré llorando" (David Beigbeder)	4:23
Total length:		39:58

== Personnel ==
Credits adapted from the album's liner notes.

- Jeanette – vocals, primary artist

=== Production ===
- Manuel Alejandro – producer, arranger, orchestration
- José Antonio Alvarez Alija – engineer, assistant producer
- Maurizio Gaudenzi – assistant engineer
- David Beigbeder – conductor, assistant producer

=== Cover design ===
- Antonio Lax – design
- Francisco Ontañón – photography
- José María Castellví – photography

== Charts ==
Chart (1981–82)	Peak position
Argentina (CAPIF)	1
Chile	1
Mexico (AMPROFON)	4
U.S. Billboard Hot Latin LPs (Florida)	23
Spain (PROMUSICAE)	1

== Certifications ==
Region	Certification	Certified units/sales
Spain (PROMUSICAE)	2× Gold	100,000^{^}
^{^} Shipments figures based on certification alone.

== See also ==
- 1981 in music
- 1982 in music
- Latin ballad
- List of number-one albums in Argentina
