= Porque te vas =

- Cover of the 1976 Polydor single released in Germany and Austria.

Single by Jeanette
- Language: Spanish
- B-side: "Seguiré amando"
- Released: 1974
- Recorded: 1974
- Studio: Hispavox Studios, Madrid
- Genre: Pop; canción melódica
- Length: 3:21
- Label: Hispavox
- Songwriter: José Luis Perales
- Producer: Rafael Trabucchelli

Jeanette singles chronology
"Palabras, promesas" (1973)	"Porque te vas" (1974)	"Vengo de un sueño de amor" (1975)

"Porque te vas" (pronounced [ˈpoɾke te βas]; Spanish for "Because You Are Leaving") is a song by English-born Spanish singer Jeanette, written by José Luis Perales and produced by Rafael Trabucchelli for record label Hispavox in 1974. A romantic ballad incorporating elements of funk, disco and pop music, the song deals with the pain of romantic parting, featuring Jeanette's distinctive high-pitched vocals over a prominent saxophone-driven arrangement.

Perales wrote the song in three hours during a rainy afternoon, composing it specifically with Jeanette's voice in mind while he was still an emerging songwriter. The track was produced at Hispavox Studios in Madrid by Rafael Trabucchelli, a pioneer of Spanish music production whose orchestral style became known as the "Torrelaguna Sound". Though initially a modest success upon its 1974 release, "Porque te vas" gained widespread recognition after being featured on the soundtrack of Carlos Saura's 1976 film Cría cuervos, prompting a reissue that propelled the single to number one in France, Germany, and Belgium Wallonia.

The song has since attained cult status and is considered one of the most famous songs in Spanish pop music. It has been covered by numerous artists across multiple languages, and remains the most commercially successful song in Perales' career. "Porque te vas" has also been frequently discussed in the context of the final years of Francisco Franco's dictatorship, with its breakthrough coinciding with Franco's death in 1975.

== Background and recording ==
Jeanette made her solo debut in 1971 with the release of the Manuel Alejandro-penned single "Soy rebelde" on label Hispavox, which marked her return to music and established her as a melodic singer, veering away from the folk-pop of Pic-Nic, her previous group of the 1960s. A commercial success, the hit single topped the charts in Spain and charted in the Top 10 of Latin American countries such as Argentina, Colombia and Peru; becoming a popular "teen anthem" in the Spanish-speaking world. Inspired by Jeanette's success, José Luis Perales decided to write a song for her, since he was still at the beginning of his career and "practically nobody well-known had recorded his songs". Perales has stated that he wrote "Porque te vas" in three hours during a rainy afternoon in his cottage, which possessed no water or electricity. That day, he also wrote the song "Escucha"; both tracks were composed with Jeanette's singular voice in mind, with Perales imitating her high-pitched vocals in the demo recording.

The song was produced by Rafael Trabuchelli, considered a pioneer of music production in Spain and "one of the most influential figures in Spanish music between 1965 and 1975." While working for Hispavox, he had developed the "characteristic lush sound" of 1970s Spanish ballads, which "[resulted] from sophisticated orchestral arrangements and studio wizardry." He is now described as the "Spanish Phil Spector", and his production style was known as the "Torrelaguna Sound", named after the Torrelaguna Street in Madrid, where Hispavox Studios was based. Perales had met Trabuchelli through musician friends, and showed him the demo of "Porque te vas", which he received with enthusiasm. Juan Márquez was in charge of the track's conducting and arrangement. According to Perales, Jeanette initially refused to record the song, as she wanted to keep working with well-known composers like Manuel Alejandro, and eventually gave in after her surroundings pushed her to do it. The singer has denied such claims, saying that she "[loved] it" from the beginning.

== Composition ==
"Porque te vas"
"Simple and effective, the song intrigues. This entanglement of horn and guitar sounds armed with a wah-wah pedal, cadenced by drums hitting the open hi-hat, offers against all odds a support adapted to the strange acidulated voice of its interpreter and later to the intervention of the brass. The basic and alert rhythm of 'Porque te vas' easily enters the ear, and later the head."
– Antoine Deshusses, Le Monde, 2005.

"Porque te vas" is a romantic ballad that incorporates elements of funk, disco and pop music, featuring a predominant use of the saxophone. Critic Julián Molero of Lafonoteca described the track's instrumentation as "full of self-confidence with almost mocking interventions of the brasses and the crash of the drums releasing unexpected blows". Writing for the Spanish edition of Rolling Stone, Miguel Ángel Bargueño wrote that the song possessed "an unruly rhythm and distinctly pop sound". In the book Lost in the Grooves: Scram's Capricious Guide to the Music You Missed, authors Kim Cooper and David Smay described the song as: "delicate breezy pop with one of those super-suave catchy tunes". The organizers of Festival Europa Sur stated in 2014 that with tracks like "Porque te vas", Jeanette "demonstrated that a canción melódica song can be approached from a pop optic". Her vocals have been described as "innocent", "mischievous", "sweet", "sultry" and "angelic". Julián Molero felt that Jeanette's voice, "this time moves a bit away from the usual sweetness to become a childish and playful air."

A love song, "Porque te vas" deals with "the pain of parting." Its lyrics "speak of a loss, of an abandonment", and have been described as conveying a "sense of longing". Jeanette begins singing: "Hoy en mi ventana brilla el sol y el corazón se pone triste contemplando la ciudad, porque te vas" ("Today the sun shines in my window and the heart gets sad contemplating the city, because you're leaving"). The refrain features the lyrics: "Todas las promesas de mi amor se irán contigo / Me olvidarás / Me olvidarás / Junto a la estación yo lloraré igual que un niño / Porque te vas" ("All of my love's promises will go with you / You will forget me / You will forget me / Beside the station I will cry like a child / Because you are leaving"). She is often, albeit mistakenly, thought to be singing "¿Por qué te vas?" or "Porqué te vas" ("Why are you leaving?"). Regarding the confusion, La Voz de Galicia stated in 2016, "[T]hat causal conjunction does not contain a question, but an assumption. Come on, she, the abandoned, has assumed it, so the small stripe of the diacritic would be a step back in history. And no! With all the work that comes from heartbreak."

== Release and reception ==
Professional ratings
Review scores
Source	Rating
Lafonoteca	4/5 stars
La Vanguardia	(1974) (1976)

Hispavox released "Porque te vas" as a 7-inch single in 1974. It featured B-side "Seguiré amando", a ballad written by Jeanette with a "South American air". Upon release, La Vanguardia gave the single two out of five stars—rating that indicated "applause"—and called it "trivial and well-arranged".

In 1976, "Porque te vas" was reissued after the commercial and critical success of the film Cría cuervos, where it was part of its soundtrack. Following the single's reissue in 1976, La Vanguardia rose its rating to three out of five stars—indicating "ovation".

== Cover versions ==
"Porque te vas" has been covered by many artists across several languages. It remains the "most covered and profitable" song in José Luis Perales' career. In 1977, Finnish singer Merja Rantamäki recorded the song as "Veit sydämen", which was included in her album Mä mistä löytäisin sen laulun. The same year, German singer Sabrina covered the song as "...Und du willst gehn" and released it as a single. Brazilian singer Lilian recorded a Portuguese version of the song under the title "Eu sem você", released in 1978. Soviet band Vesyolye Rebyata recorded a version in Russian titled "V posledniy raz", which appeared in their 1979 album Muzykal'nyy Globus. Argentine punk rock band Attaque 77 included a cover of "Porque te vas" in their 1992 album Ángeles caídos. The British-born Andorran singer Jack Lucien released an English language version titled "You're Leaving Me" with English language lyrics by Elizabeth Hurley and Patsy Kensit. In 1999, German band Masterboy covered the song and released it as a single.

In 2013, American singer Kali Uchis released a version of the song through SoundCloud and recorded a music video.

In 2020, French-Italian singer Carla Bruni released an acoustic version of the song on her self-titled album. It is the first song she recorded in Spanish.

In 2004, Spanish /Danish singer Brigitte Escobar released a jazzy version of Por Que Te Vas on her debut album 'Brigitte', Red Kite records.

In 2021, the Belgian synth duo Vive la Fête's version of the song was included on their album, Viva Alternativa.

In 2022, the French group Montmartre released a version of the song in French, "Pourquoi tu pars".

In 1999, the Bollywood movie “Hum Saath Saath Hain” uses the chorus melody as an interpolation in the “ABCD” song in the bus travel scene.

== Legacy ==
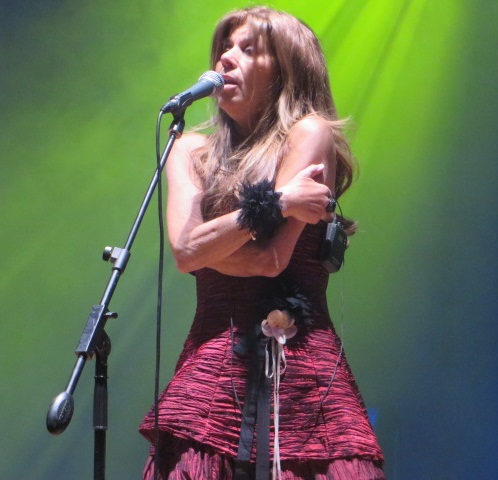
Jeanette performing "Porque te vas" in Arequipa, Peru, 2014.

Since its inclusion in Cría cuervos, "Porque te vas" has attained cult status, and is now considered a classic, remaining one of the most famous songs of Spanish pop music. In 1979, Madrilenian newspaper ABC wrote that, "never had a Spanish song, and sung in our language, achieved such popularity levels on both sides of the Atlantic." Efe Eme's Luis Lapuente described the single in 2016 as "a precious cult object among European collectors, who compare the former lead singer of Pic-Nic with delicious French lolitas such as Lio or Françoise Hardy". "Porque te vas", along with other Jeanette songs, has been revalued by the indie music scene—particularly indie pop—which considers the singer a "muse" and "godmother".

"Porque te vas" is often analyzed in relation to the final years of Francisco Franco's regime, time in which "Spanish society began to submerge in the cultural wave that dominated Europe." Authors Kim Cooper and David Smay considered the single to be "quite symbolic", since its "breakout" was around the same time as Franco's death. Likewise, in his book Yé-Yé Girls of '60s French Pop, Jean-Emmanuel Deluxe felt that Jeanette was "a real ray of sunshine in a country under the strict military regime of the dictator Franco." Writing for the South Korean online newspaper Voice of the People, Gwon Jongsul argued that the song's inclusion in Cría cuervos gave it a new, political meaning—becoming associated with the dictatorship and bringing a "more intense pain" to the lyrics.

The Spanish edition of Rolling Stone ranked it forty third on the magazine's 2006 list of "The 200 Best Songs of Spanish Pop-Rock". In the song's entry, Miguel Ángel Bargueño felt that "Porque te vas" "broke the image of folk balladist that Jeanette carried since her Pic-Nic stage and conveyed an accentuated feeling of loss that caused a greater impact by being interpreted by a helpless-looking twenty-year-old." In 2014, Diariocrítico.com placed "Porque te vas" at number fifty four on its list of the 100 best songs of Spanish pop. Writing for The Guardian, Andrew Khan described the song as "a masterpiece of downbeat easy listening," and praised it for "[proving] once again there's often more depth of emotion in derided MOR pop than other, more fashionable, genres."

Carla Bruni has claimed that listening to the song inspired her to pursue a career in music. French film director Jean-Pierre Améris has called it one of his favorite records. In a 1995 interview, the then newly formed French duo Air described themselves as big admirers of the song, which they came to know during their childhood. Band member Nicolas Godin stated: "We like it so much that we have composed a song in its line. We would love for her to sing it, but in France she is too well known and we are afraid that the collaboration will end up eclipsing us. So we're looking for a singer that resembles her."

The song has been adapted as football chants by fans of the Argentine San Lorenzo de Almagro, the Chilean Colo-Colo clubs and the French A.S. Saint-Étienne.

In the 2022 film Exterior Night, the song is played at the end of episode one.

The 2022 initial season of the German TV series Kleo featured the song in the third episode.

== Charts ==
=== Weekly charts ===
Chart (1974–77)	Peak position
Austria (Ö3 Austria Top 40)	13
Belgium Wallonia (Ultratop)	1
Belgium Flanders (Ultratop)	29
Finland (Billboard)	6
France (SNEP)	1
Germany (Offizielle Deutsche Charts)	1
Mexico (Billboard)	11
Netherlands (Dutch Top 40)	32
Portugal (Billboard)	6
Spain (AFYVE)	19
Switzerland (Swiss Hitparade)	4

Chart (2008)	Peak position
US Latin Pop Songs (Billboard)	28

Chart (2012)	Peak position
Netherlands (Single Top 100)	85

Chart performance for "Porque te vas" (The Avener 2026 version)
Chart (2026)	Peak position
North Macedonia Airplay (Radiomonitor)	4

=== Year-end charts ===
Chart (1976)	Peak position
France (SNEP)	1
Germany (Gerd Steinkoenig)	7

=== Decade-end charts ===
Chart (1970–1979)	Peak position
France (InfoDisc)	138
Germany (Offizielle Deutsche Charts)	81

== Certifications and sales ==
Certifications and sales for Porque Te Vas
Region	Certification	Certified units/sales
France (SNEP)	Gold	850,000
Germany	—	400,000

== Personnel ==
Credits adapted from the liner notes of the original single release.

- Jeanette – primary artist, vocals
- Rafael Trabucchelli – producer
- Juan Márquez – arranger, conductor
- Elías Dolcet – photography
- Juan Dolcet – photography

== See also ==
- Yé-yé
- Music of Spain
- 1974 in music
- 1976 in music
- List of best-selling singles in France
- List of number-one singles of 1976 (France)
- List of number-one hits of 1977 (Germany)
- List of best-selling Latin singles
