= Beigbeder =

Beigbeder is a surname. Notable people with the surname include:

- Charles Beigbeder, French businessman
- Frédéric Beigbeder, French writer
- Géraldine Beigbeder, French writer
- Juan Luis Beigbeder y Atienza (1888–1957), Spanish politician

== See also ==
- Germán Álvarez Beigbeder (1882–1968), Spanish composer
