= Soy rebelde =

Single by Jeanette

from the album Palabras, promesas
- B-side: "Oye mamá, oye papá"
- Released: 1971
- Studio: Hispavox Studios, Madrid
- Genre: Canción melódica
- Length: 3:12
- Label: Hispavox
- Songwriters: Manuel Alejandro; Ana Magdalena
- Producer: Rafael Trabucchelli

Jeanette singles chronology
"Soy rebelde" (1971)	"Estoy triste" (1972)

"Soy rebelde" (English: "I am a rebel") is a Spanish pop ballad written by Manuel Alejandro and Ana Magdalena. It was released by British-born singer Jeanette in 1971, and was her debut solo single. It has been re-recorded by Jeanette in English, French, and Japanese, and has inspired cover versions in diverse genres from flamenco to punk rock and rap.

== Development ==
Following the dissolution of her former band Pic-Nic in 1969, Jeanette remained with the Hispavox label and moved to Barcelona the next year. Songwriter Manuel Alejandro wrote the song for a Mexican singer, Sola, but offered it to Jeanette, who is half Spanish. Jeanette originally did not like the song; in an interview posted in Cha Cha Charming magazine, Jeanette said, "My style of music was folk music . . . but Hispavox wanted me to sing this romantic music that I could not relate to." They recorded the song that summer.

== Composition ==
"Soy rebelde" is a quintessential sad song. The song uses a melody based on piano, wind instruments and violins that surrounds Jeanette's soft vocals.

The song begins with a combination of piano and violin. The lyrics describe a solitary person, relating a life marked by pain, and focusing on a search for happiness, friendship and love. Jeanette's voice was an angelic whisper; Alejandro remarked it was "the tiniest voice I have ever heard", and that it would have been just another Mexican song if she did not sing it.

The song is one of the greatest exponents of the "Torrelaguna Sound", named after the Torrelaguna Street in Madrid, where Hispavox Studios was based. This production style was influenced by Phil Spector's Wall of Sound, and experimented with the layering of instruments and reverb.

== Release ==
When "Soy rebelde" was released, the record label misspelled her name (Janette) as "Jeanette", but after the single became a "runaway hit", the label decided to retain the latter spelling as her stage name. The single was played in Spain, but also extended to other countries, including: France, Belgium, England, Mexico, Italy, Argentina, and Venezuela. The B-side was "Oye Mama, Oye Papa" (Listen Mama, Listen Papa).

In May 1972, Jeanette released the single in Japan as "Soy rebelde (あまのじゃく, Amanojaku)", under Nippon Columbia records. She sang it in Japanese; the lyrics and arrangement were done by J. Hamada, with Waldo de Los Rios and his orchestra providing supporting music. The B-side was still the Spanish version of "Oye Mama, Oye Papa (オイェ・ママ、オイェ・パパ, Oie Mama Oie Papa)".

In 1976, Jeanette released the album Porque te vas, which consisted of French versions of her singles. "Soy rebelde" became "L'inconnu Qui M'aimera" (The Stranger Who Loves Me). She also released the song as a B-side to her single Je suis triste.

Jeanette's English version, "I Am a Rebel", was released in the United Kingdom as a B-side to her Spanish single.

== Reception ==
"Soy rebelde" was a commercial success and redefined Jeanette's career to that of a romantic balladist. The hit single topped the charts in Spain, staying on the charts for ten weeks. It also charted in the Top 10 of Latin American countries such as Argentina, Colombia and Peru. The song became a popular teen anthem throughout the Spanish-speaking world. This generation "adopted Jeanette as a symbol of a desire that became embedded in the subconscious of the collective memory."

== Track listing ==
=== Spanish version ===
The Spanish version was released in 1971 by Hispavox, catalog #: HS-764.

Vinyl, 7", Single
No.	Title	Writer(s)	Length
1.	"Soy rebelde"	Manuel Alejandro	3:12
2.	"Oye mamá, oye papá"	Manuel Alejandro	3:22

=== Japanese version ===
The Japanese version was released in May 1972 by Nippon Columbia, catalog #: LL-2543-H

Vinyl, 7", Single
No.	Title	Writer(s)	Length
1.	"Soy rebelde (あまのじゃく, Amanojaku)" (sung in Japanese)	J. Hamada	3:12
2.	"Oye Mama Oye Papa (オイェ・ママ、オイェ・パパ, Oie Mama Oie Papa; Listen Mama, Listen Papa)" (sung in Spanish)	M. Alejandro	3:22

=== French version ===
The French version was released as a B-side to the single, "Je suis triste", Hispavox catalog #: 2022 014

Vinyl, 7", Single
No.	Title	Writer(s)	Length
1.	"Je suis triste" (sung in French)	M. Alejandro	3:58
2.	"L'inconnu qui m'aimera" (sung in French)	M. Alejandro	3:12

=== English version ===
Vinyl, 7", Single
No.	Title	Writer(s)	Length
1.	"Yo soy rebelde"	M. Alejandro	3:12
2.	"I Am a Rebel" (sung in English)	M. Alejandro/ S. LeBrocq	3:12

== Cover-versions/multiple-renditions ==
"Soy rebelde" has inspired cover versions and renditions:

- In 1978, the Brazilian singer Lilian Knapp recorded a Portuguese version of the song titled "Sou Rebelde" (on the B-side, another version of a Jeanette song, "Porque te vas").
- In 1997, Albert Pla, a Catalan singer-songwriter, sang "Soy rebelde", and released it on his album Veintegenarios En Alburquerque. It was also presented in the film Airbag as "Yo soy rebelde".<
- In 1998, Argentine group Attaque 77 released their album Otras Canciones, containing a punk rock version of "Soy rebelde". It was also featured on their live album, Trapos.
- In 2005, Esmirna sang "Soy rebelde" on his episode of Chilean animated series Diego and Glot.
- In 2007, Fernando Caro sang "Soy rebelde" on his debut album Rebelde. Spanish flamenco singer Pastora Soler also sang "Soy rebelde" as a duet with India Martinez.
- In 2008, French singer Nathalie Cardone did a version of "Soy rebelde" that features a guitar for the background music.
- In 2009, Rosario Flores covered "Soy rebelde" on her Spanish pop songs from the 1970s album, Cuéntame. Mariano Prunes of Allmusic remarked that Flores's version is one of her best. Flores also released a video clip of the song.
- In May 2012, rap music group Rebel Diaz sang "Soy rebelde" from its album Radical Dilemma. Its version's message is "that struggle against the status quo has a history that needs to be continued." It samples Jeanette's version, calling hers "a late 60s Spanish pop ballad."
