= Let Them Talk (film) =

1968 Spanish-Argentine musical film

- Spanish: Digan lo que digan
- Directed by: Mario Camus
- Written by: Antonio Gala; Miguel Rubio; Mario Camus
- Story by: Horacio Gisado
- Starring: Raphael
- Cinematography: Juan Julio Baena
- Edited by: Jorge Gárate; Anthony Rambledon
- Music by: Antón García Abril
- Production companies: Argentina Sono Film; Producciones Día
- Release date: 1968
- Running time: 95 min.
- Countries: Argentina; Spain
- Language: Spanish

Let Them Talk (Spanish: Digan lo que digan) is a 1968 Spanish-Argentine musical film directed by Mario Camus and starring Raphael. It was filmed in Iguazu Falls, Buenos Aires, and Spain. The score of the film was composed by Antón García Abril, and the songs were written by Manuel Alejandro.

== Cast ==
- Raphael as Rafael Gandía
- Serena Vergano as Blanca
- Ignacio Quirós as Miguel
- Susana Campos as Blanca's Friend
- Darío Vittori as Luis
- Hernán Guido as Arencibia
- Aldo Bigatti as Mario
- Alicia Duncan as Blanca's aunt
