= Toti Soler =

Spanish guitarist, singer and composer

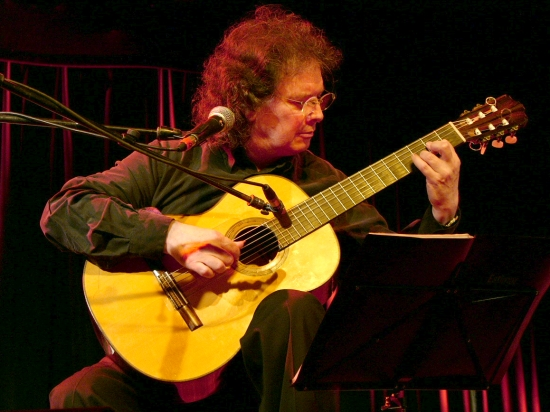

Background information
- Born: 7 June 1949 (age 76); Vilassar de Dalt, Barcelona, Catalonia, Spain
- Genres: Flamenco, classical, blues, jazz
- Occupation(s): Composer, guitarist
- Instrument(s): Guitar, vocals
- Website: www.totisoler.com

Jordi Soler i Galí (born 7 June 1949), known by the stage name Toti Soler, is a Spanish guitarist, singer and composer, member of cult groups Pic-Nic in the 1960s and Om in the 1970s. He had a classical training with influences of blues, jazz and flamenco. His compositions are noted for their poetic, sensitive qualities and often use extracts from poetry.

== Early life and studies ==
Jordi Soler i Galí was born on 7 June 1949 in Vilassar de Dalt, Barcelona. He trained at the Conservatori Municipal de Música de Barcelona from 1965 and the Spanish Guitar Centre in London from 1969. His blues influence was obtained from American blues musician Taj Mahal, whom he met in 1971, and his flamenco influence was obtained from Diego del Gastor during a trip to Andalucia in 1972.

== Works and awards ==
Soler's work has appeared in several films, such as Ugo Tognazzi's I viaggiatori della sera (1979). In the early 1980s he performed in a duo with flautist Ma Anand Yashu. In the late 1980s he worked with Pedro Javier González. He has worked with Léo Ferré, José Manuel Roldan, Ovidi Montllor, Jordi Sabatés, Cinta Massip, Ester Formosa, Carles Rebassa, Francesc Pi de la Serra, Pascal Comelade, Maria del Mar Bonet and Pau Riba, amongst others.

In 1996, Soler participated in the seventh (VII) Festival de Guitarra de Barcelona performing works of J. S. Bach. Later that year he won the Catalan award for best record (Premi al Millor Disc Català de l'Any), for the anthology Lydda. In 2002, Soler recorded the album Vita Nuova and performed it at the Palau de la Música Catalana. In 2003, he received the Premio Nuevas Músicas award from the Sociedad General de Autores y Editores (SGAE). In 2005, he received the Premi Nacional de Música de Catalunya (National Music Prize of Catalonia), awarded by the Culture Department of the Generalitat of Catalonia, for his albums L'arxiver de Tortosa, Racconto and Guitar cançons i. In 2006 he was awarded the Creu de Sant Jordi.

In 2004, Plays International said of Joan Ollé's production at the Teatre Lliure of Chekhov's Uncle Vanya that "Toti Soler's guitarist, providing a lyrical underscoring to the onstage action, functions both as an observer and commentator. His stark music is poignant and melancholy, and captures beautifully the enigmatic mood of on- and off-stage traumas and passions."

Soler's live cover of Leonard Cohen's "Suzanne" (sung in Catalan and entitled "Susanna") appeared on the 2007 album "Acordes Con Leonard Cohen."
