= Waldo de los Ríos =

Argentine composer, conductor and arranger (1934–1977)

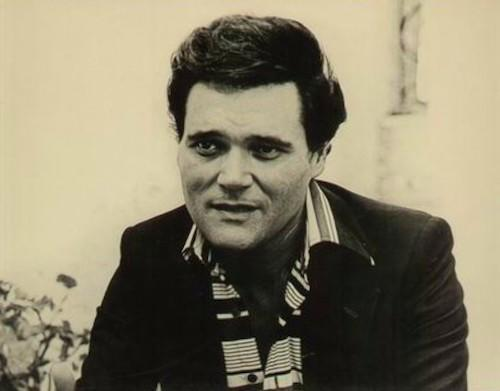

Background information
- Born: Osvaldo Nicolás Ferraro Gutiérrez; 7 September 1934; Buenos Aires, Argentina
- Died: 28 March 1977 (aged 42) Madrid, Spain
- Genre: Film score
- Occupation: Composer

Osvaldo Nicolás Ferraro Gutiérrez (7 September 1934 – 28 March 1977), better known as Waldo de los Ríos, was an Argentine composer, conductor and arranger.

== Life and career ==
De los Ríos was born in Buenos Aires into a musical family; his father was a musician and his mother a well known folk singer; he studied composition and arranging at the National Conservatory of Music under Alberto Ginastera, Teodoro Fuchs, and Lita Spena. He was inspired by an eclectic range of music and formed a musical group called "The Waldos" which crossed folk music with electronic sounds. De los Ríos turned to work in cinema and film sound tracks where his compositions were heard in the 1967 film Savage Pampas, for which he received a prestigious award from the Argentine Academy of Cinematography Arts and Sciences. He relocated to the US in 1958 and then to Spain in 1962.

He is best remembered for his ability to transform European classical music into pop music. His 1971 arrangement of Mozart's Symphony No. 40, recorded with the Manuel de Falla orchestra, reached the top spot in the Dutch charts and scored a top 10 hit in several other European countries. (In the U.S. it peaked at #67 on the Billboard charts, released through United Artists Records.) In 1970, prior to this success, Waldo de los Ríos had already climbed the charts around Europe and America with Ludwig van Beethoven's Ode To Joy, which he arranged and conducted for Miguel Ríos "Song of Joy".

His record Mozart in the Seventies rearranged famous Mozart pieces in a contemporary style, with a large percussion section. Several tracks from it were used as theme tunes to BBC programmes of that era, including the theme to the BBC's coverage of the Horse of the Year Show (his reworking of Mozart's A Musical Joke). His re-working of Eine kleine Nachtmusik, used for many years as the theme to the Radio 4 quiz show Brain of Britain, was the subject of frequent complaints from classical music fans (with whom the show was popular) and presenter Robert Robinson described it on air as "Mozart plus sacrilege".

He also issued an album Symphonies for the Seventies which included Mozart's Symphony no. 40 and other major composers including Dvořák's New World. He arranged and conducted the Spanish entry for the Eurovision Song Contest 1971, "En un mundo nuevo" for Karina. The song landed a respectable second position and hit the charts in several European countries.

He was married to actress turned journalist/author Isabel Pisano (born in Montevideo, Uruguay, 1944). Pisano later documented part of his life in her autobiography El amado fantasma (Plaza y Janés, 2002).

A victim of an acute depression while working on "Don Juan Tenorio", De los Ríos committed suicide in Madrid in 1977.

== Los Waldos ==
Los Waldos were a folk group from Argentina based in Spain, formed by Waldo de los Rios. They played folk songs from Argentina with modern instruments, such as electric guitars, electric bass, drums, piano and synthesizers, sometimes accompanied by an orchestra. They started in the mid sixties and released various albums in Spain. The band was made up of five members:

- Waldo de los Rios (arranger, piano)
- Cesar Gentili (keyboards)
- Willy Rubio (guitars)
- Roberto Stella (drums)
- Alberto Carbia (bass guitar)

They disbanded in the late sixties when Waldo started his solo career.

== Discography ==
All his records were released under the Hispa-Vox Label. His first recordings were made with his folk group "Los Waldos". During late 60s and mid 70s he made several arrangements for many Spanish and international famous artists such as: Raphael, Mari Trini, Alberto Cortez, Facundo Cabral, Tony Landa, Jeanette Dimech, Miguel Ríos, Los Pekenikes, María Ostiz, Karina, Paloma San Basilio, Los Payos, etc.

On his discography as soloist:

- "Los Waldos", 1965 (With "Los Waldos")
- "Waldo de los Rios en Europa", 1965 (With "Los Waldos")
- "España Electrodinámica Vol. 1", 1966
- "Folklore Dinámico", 1966 (With "Los Waldos")
- "España en 3era Dimensión" 1967
- "Suite SudAmericana - Argentina•Paraguay•Peru•Uruguay" 1968
- "Waldo en la TVE", 1968
- "El Sonido Mágico Vol. 1", 1969
- "El Sonido Mágico Vol. 2", 1970
- "Sinfonías", 1970
- "Mozartmania", 1971
- "Symphonies for the Seventies", 1971
- "Operas", 1973
- "Navidad Con Waldo de Los Rios" 1973
- "Sinfonías 2", 1974
- "Oberturas", 1974
- "Concierto Para La Guitarra Criolla", with Ernesto Bitetti, 1974
- "Conciertos", 1976
- "Corales", 1977 (Postum Release)

=== Film scores ===
- Alias Gardelito (Alias Big Shot) (1961)
- The Blonde from Buenos Aires (1961), with Mamie Van Doren
- Savage Pampas (1966), with Robert Taylor
- La residencia (The House That Screamed) (1969), with Lilli Palmer
- A Town Called Bastard (1971), with Telly Savalas
- Bad Man's River (1971), with James Mason, Gina Lollobrigida
- Murders in the Rue Morgue (1971), with Jason Robards, Herbert Lom
- The Corruption of Chris Miller (1973), with Jean Seberg, Barry Stokes
- Boquitas pintadas (1974)
- Who Can Kill a Child? (1976), with Lewis Fiander, Prunella Ransome

== In popular culture ==
De Los Ríos's version of Schubert's Unfinished Symphony No. 8 was used extensively in the series The Smurfs as the background music for Gargamel, the series' lead villain.

On 10 March 2010 The Rush Limbaugh Show played an AM radio optimized mix of de los Ríos's version of Symphony No. 40 in G Minor. The exposure propelled the song and the CD's popularity from No, 136,705 to No. 1 on Amazon.com's rankings.
