= Jordi Sabatés =

Spanish pianist, composer and arranger (1948–2022)

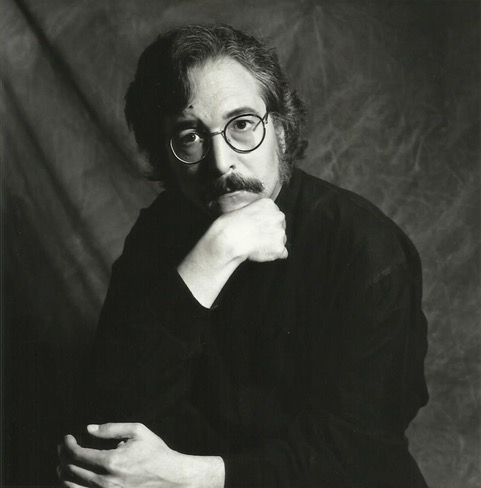

Jordi Sabatés Navarro (Barcelona, Spain, 23 October 1948 – Barcelona, 10 January 2022) was a Spanish pianist, composer, and arranger.

== Biography ==
In his youth, he was a member of the folk-rock band Pic-Nic. He later joined the progressive rock band Om. He composed also several film scores, mainly documentaries such as Bola de Nieve (2003). In 1971 he formed the group Jarka and in 1973 he began working with Toti Soler. In the late 1990s he toured with Maria del Mar Bonet and other notable Spanish artists. He died on 10 January 2022, at the age of 73.
