= Raphael (singer) =

Spanish singer and actor (born 1943)

The Most Excellent Raphael
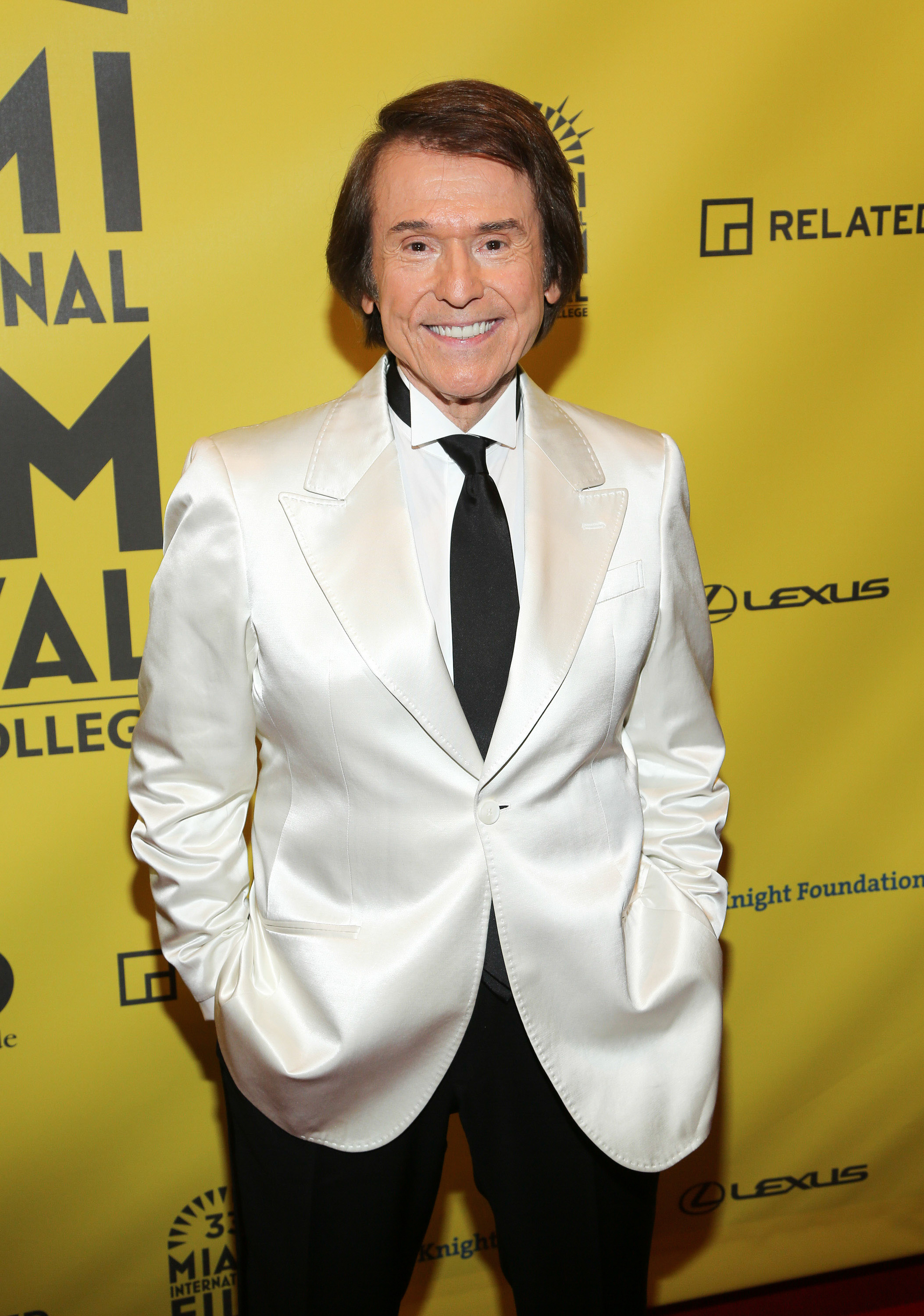
- Raphael in 2014

Background information
- Also known as: Raphaelito, El Divo de Linares (The Divo of Linares), El Ruiseñor de Linares (The Nightingale of Linares), El Niño (The Kid)
- Born: Miguel Rafael Martos Sánchez; 5 May 1943 (age 83); Linares, Jaén, Spain
- Genres: Latin ballad; pop; folk
- Occupation: Singer • actor
- Instrument: Vocals
- Years active: 1959–present
- Labels: Philips; Barclay; Hispavox; EMI; Sony; Columbia; PolyGram
- Website: www.raphaelnet.com

Miguel Rafael Martos Sánchez (born 5 May 1943), known professionally as Raphael, is a Spanish singer and actor. He is widely recognized for his extensive vocal range and charismatic stage presence. He has sold over 70 million albums in up to 7 languages. His career has spanned more than six decades, leaving a lasting influence on Spanish-speaking music.

Raphael rose to fame in the early 1960s after winning the Benidorm Song Festival. He represented Spain in the Eurovision Song Contest in 1966 and 1967 with the songs "Yo soy aquél" and "Hablemos del amor", finishing in seventh and sixth place, respectively. In 1967, he performed at Madison Square Garden in New York City before an audience of 48,000 people and, in 1969, premiered the Las Vegas residency Viva Raphael at Flamingo. In 1982, he received a uranium record for surpassing 50 million records sold, making him one of the best-selling Latin music artists in history.

He remains one of the most active performers among the so-called divos of Latin ballads, regularly touring across the Americas and Europe. His accolades include the Billboard Latin Music Lifetime Achievement Award in 2022 and was named Person of the Year by the Latin Recording Academy in 2025.

== Childhood ==
Raphael was born Miguel Rafael Martos Sánchez in Linares (Jaén), Spain. As a consequence, he is nicknamed both "El Ruiseñor de Linares" ("Nightingale of Linares") and "El Divo de Linares" ("The Divo from Linares") but is also known as "El Niño". His family moved to Madrid when he was nine months old, and he started singing when he was just three years-old. He joined a children's choir at age four. When he was 9, he was recognized as the best child voice in Europe at a contest in Salzburg, Austria. His two idols, when he was growing up, and with whom he announced, on 6 October 2014, his plans to record posthumous duets with, were said to be US singer Elvis Presley and French diva Edith Piaf.

== Career ==
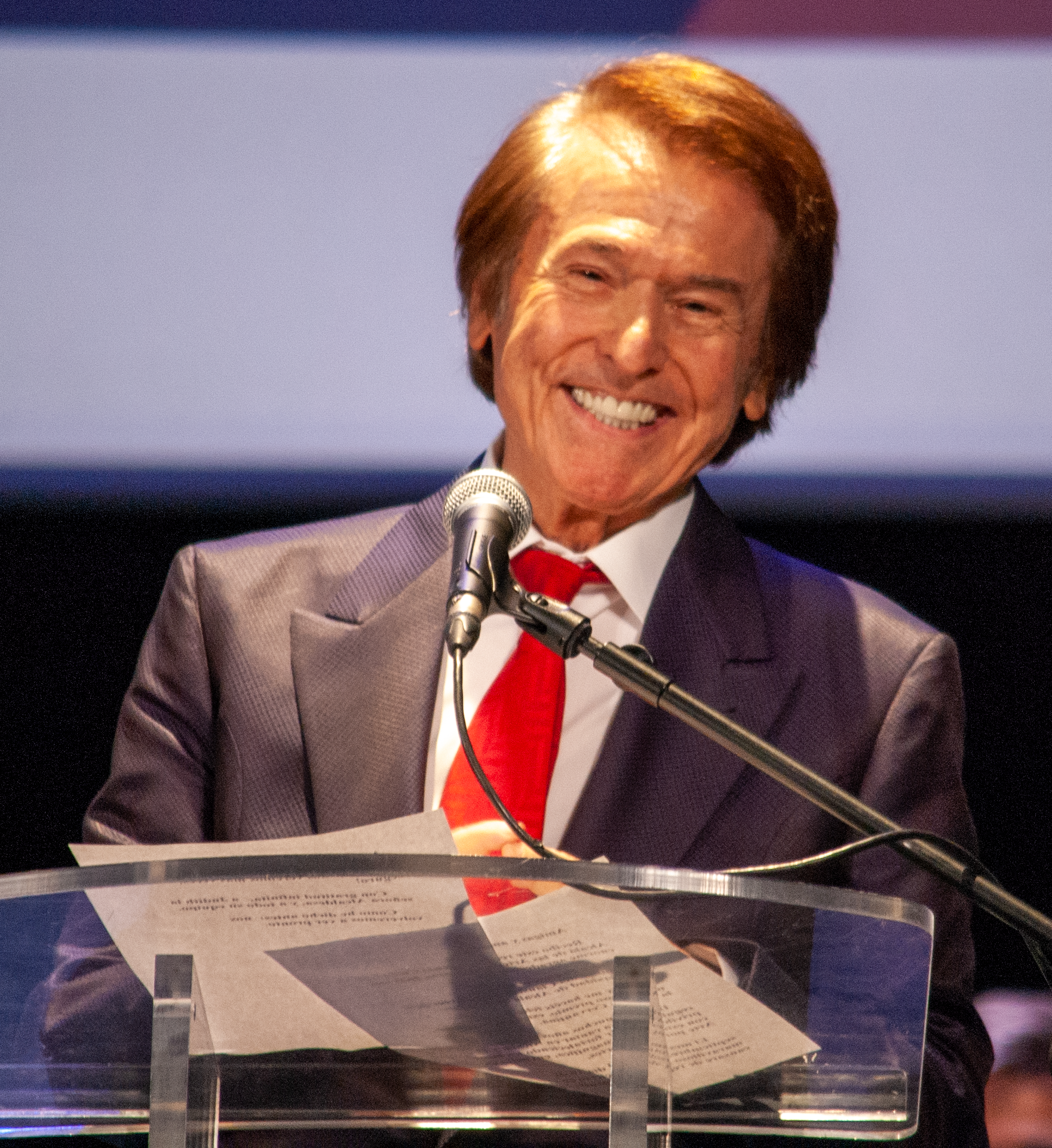
Raphael in 2023

=== First recordings ===
Raphael began his professional career by singing with the Dutch record label Philips. To distinguish himself, he adopted the "ph" of the company's name and christened himself 'Raphael'. His first singles were "Te voy a contar mi vida" and "A pesar de todo", among others. Raphael adopted his own peculiar singing style from the beginning; he is known for acting each one of his songs while on stage, emphasizing his gestures with high dramatic effect. It is not unusual for Raphael to ad lib lyrics as to localize a song depending on the venue he's singing at, wear Latin American peasant costumes and dance folk dances within a song, kicking and demolishing a mirror, or doing the moves of a flamenco dancer or a bullfighter onstage. He also possesses a wide vocal range, which he often used in the beginning of his career as to evoke a choirboy approach to some songs.

=== Benidorm Song Festival, Eurovision Song Contest, and international popularity ===
When he was nineteen, he won first, second, and third awards at the Benidorm Song Festival, in Benidorm, in 1962 and 1963 with the songs: "Llevan", "Inmensidad", and "Tu conciencia". After a brief relation with Barclay record label, who produced just an EP, he signed a contract with Hispavox recording company, and began a long artistic relationship with the musical director of this label, the late, talented Argentinian orchestrator Waldo de los Ríos and intensify the partnership with outstanding Spanish songwriter Manuel Alejandro.

Raphael represented Spain at the Eurovision Song Contest in 1966 and 1967 singing "Yo soy aquél" in Luxembourg City, and "Hablemos del amor" in Vienna, placing seventh and sixth, respectively. This marked Spain's strongest showing in the contest at the time, leaving the door open for victory the following year, which Spain achieved with "La, la, la" performed by Massiel. This served as a turning point in Raphael's career, making him an international star. He traveled and performed worldwide in Europe, Latin America, Puerto Rico, the United States, Russia and Japan. Songs such as "Que Tal Te Va Sin Mi", "Como Yo Te Amo", "En Carne Viva", "Digan Lo Que Digan", "Estar Enamorado", "Estuve Enamorado", and "Desde Aquel Día" cemented his status as a major international singing star.

Raphael also began a lucrative film career, appearing in, Cuando tú no estás (Mario Camus, 1966), which was followed by Al ponerse el Sol (Mario Camus, 1967), Digan lo que digan (Mario Camus, 1968, filmed in Argentina), El golfo (1969, filmed in Mexico), El ángel (1969), Sin Un Adiós (1970, partially filmed in England), and Volveré a nacer (1972).

=== Latin American popularity ===
As Raphael became a success in Latin America, he made a habit of recording Latin American folk standards including "Huapango torero", "Sandunga", and "Llorona"; they were hits in Mexico. In 1967 Raphael began a tour throughout America.

=== American and Spanish television appearances ===
He appeared live on The Ed Sullivan Show with great success on 25 October 1970, singing (in Spanish, English, and Italian) "Hallelujah" and "Hava Nagila". He appeared again on 27 December 1970, with the songs "Maybe" (Somos), "When my love is around" (Cuando llega mi amor) and "The sound of the trumpet" (Balada de la trompeta).

In 1975, Raphael began his own successful program on Spanish Television called El Mundo de Raphael, where he sang with international stars. He also had a radio program, where he and his wife spoke with and interviewed outstanding personalities, and he starred in soap operas, starting with the Mexican production Donde termina el camino, shown in the spring of 1978 and later in other countries like Peru and Chile.

=== Golden 80s ===
Raphael succeeded in the early 1980s with songs such as "¿Qué tal te va sin mí?", "Como yo te amo", "En carne viva" and "Estar enamorado".

In 1980 Raphael receives a Uranium disc, in recognition of his fifty million copies sold throughout his recording career.

During 1984 and 1985 he recorded two albums with songs written by José Luis Perales like "Ámame", "Yo sigo siendo aquel", "Dile que vuelva", "Y... Cómo es él" and "Estoy llorando hoy por ti".

In 1984 a parody of "Yo soy aquél" was used in a radio spot in Puerto Rico's gubernatorial race. Then-governor Carlos Romero Barceló used the parody (complete with a Raphael sound-alike) namely as a jab against opponent, Raphael's namesake, (and noted Spanophile), former governor Rafael Hernández Colón. Raphael was surprised by the unauthorized use of the music, but was highly amused by the reference.

In 1987 he left Hispavox and signed a contract with Columbia (now Sony Music), where he again recorded songs written by Roberto Livi like "Toco madera" and "Maravilloso corazón". In 1991 he had a hit with "Escándalo" in Spain, Latin America, and in Japan, where it reached number one. At the end of the 1990s, after ending a contract with PolyGram, he went back to EMI. In 1998 the artist published the first part of his memoirs titled ¿Y mañana qué?, from his childhood until his marriage in 1972.

Raphael took part in the 2000 Spanish version of the stage musical Jekyll & Hyde for seven months, with great success.

== Personal life ==
He married aristocrat, journalist and writer Natalia Figueroa, in Venice (Italy) on 14 July 1972. They have three children: Jacobo, Alejandra and Manuel.

Raphael's health faced a major setback in 2003, when his liver started failing due to a latent bout with hepatitis B; he recovered successfully after a transplant. Since then he is an active organ donation promoter.

In December 2024, Raphael was diagnosed with primary brain lymphoma while hospitalized in Madrid, Spain.

== Awards and accomplishments ==
Raphael has received numerous awards.

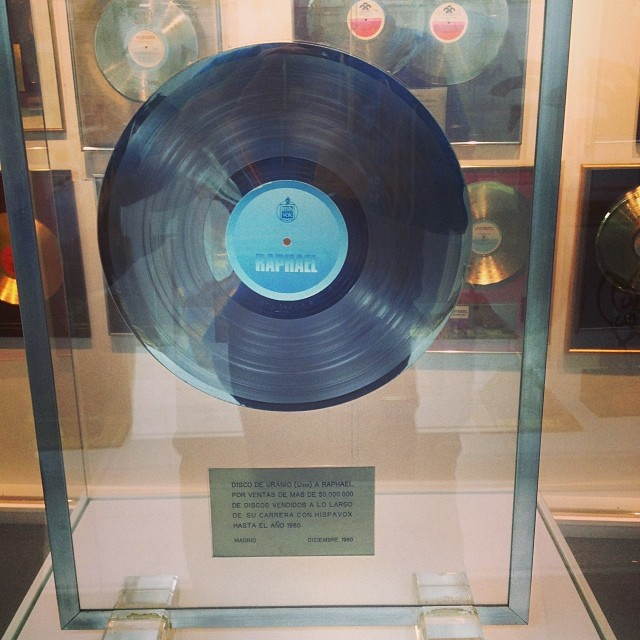
"Uranium disc" granted by his label Hispavox in 1980

He was inducted into the International Latin Music Hall of Fame in 2003.

Raphael received the Lifetime Achievement Award at the 2022 Billboard Latin Music Awards.

== Discography ==
- Raphael (1965)
- Raphael Canta (1966)
- Al Ponerse el Sol (1967)
- Digan Lo Que Digan (1967)
- El Golfo (1968)
- Huapango Torero + 3 (EP – Mexico) (1969)
- El Ángel (1969) – Ecuador Only
- Raphael – El Idolo (Philips EP's Compilation) (1969)
- Aqui! (1969)
- Corazón, Corazón (1970) Mexico
- Live at the Talk of the Town (1970) (recorded at the London Talk of the Town)
- Aleluya... (1970)
- Algo Más (1971)
- Háblame de Amor (From 'Top Star Festival' LP) (1971)
- Volveré a Nacer (1972)
- Le Llaman Jesús! (1973)
- From Here On... (1973) – English Album
- Raphael (A la Huella...) (1974)
- Raphael (De... para...) (1974)
- Qué Dirán de Mí (1974)
- Sombras + 3 (1974) (EP. – Ecuador)
- No Eches la Culpa al Gitano (From "Juntos para Ayudarte" LP) (1974)
- Recital Hispanoamericano (1975) – With Los Gemelos
- Con el Sol de la Mañana (1976)
- Raphael Canta... (1976)
- El Cantor (1977) (Mexico)
- Una Forma Muy Mía de Amar (1978)
- Y... Sigo Mi Camino (1980)
- Vivo Live Direct – 20th Anniversary (Live Double Album) (1980)
- En Carne Viva (1981)
- Raphael: Ayer, Hoy y Siempre (1982)
- Enamorado de la Vida (1983)
- Eternamente Tuyo (1984)
- Yo Sigo Siendo Aquel – 25th Anniversary (1985)
- Todo una Vida (1986)
- Las Apariencias Engañan (1988)
- Maravilloso Corazón, Maravilloso (1989)
- Andaluz (1990)
- Ave Fénix (1992)
- Fantasía (1994)
- Desde el Fondo de Mi Alma (1995)
- Punto y Seguido (1997)
- Vete (1997) – Duet with Nino Bravo
- Jekyll & Hyde (2001)
- Maldito Raphael (2001)
- De Vuelta (2003)
- Vuelve por Navidad (2004)
- A Que No Te Vas (2006) – Duet with Rocio Jurado
- Cerca de Ti (2006)
- Maravilloso Raphael (2007)
- Raphael: 50 Años Después (CD + DVD) (2008)
- Viva Raphael! (2009)
- 50 Años Después – En Directo y al Completo (3 CD + DVD) (2009)
- Te Llevo en el Corazón (3 CD + DVD) (2010)
- Te Llevo en el Corazón. Essential (2011)
- El Reencuentro (2012)
- El Reencuentro en Directo (CD + DVD) (2012)
- Mi Gran Noche (2013)
- 50 Éxitos de Mi Vida (3 CD + DVD) (2013)
- De Amor & Desamor (LP + CD) (2014)
- Raphael Sinfónico (CD + DVD) (2015)
- Ven a Mi Casa Esta Navidad (CD) (2015)
- Infinitos Bailes(LP + CD) (2016)
- 6.0 en Concierto (2021)
- Victoria (2022)
- Ayer...aún (2024)

== Billboard charts ==
https://www.billboard.com/artist/raphael/chart-history/htl/

- Toco Madera (#2)
- Maravilloso Corazón, Maravilloso (#7)
- Escándalo (#9)
- Siempre Estás Diciendo Que Te Vas (#11)
- Se Muere Por Mi la Niña (#16)
- Yo Sigo Amándote (#34)

== Filmography ==
- Las Gemelas (1963) – As Alberto
- Cuando Tú No Estás (1966) – As Rafael
- Al Ponerse el Sol (1967) – As David Alonso
- Digan lo que digan (1968) – As Rafael Gandía
- El Golfo (1968)- As Pancho
- El Ángel (1969)- As El Angel
- Sin un Adiós (1970) – As Mario Leiva
- Volveré a Nacer (1973) – As Alex
- Rafael en Raphael (Documentary) (1974) – As himself
- Donde Termina el Camino (TV) (1978)- As Manuel
- Ritmo, Amor y Primavera (1981) – As himself
- Jekyll & Hyde (Musical) (2000) – As Dr. Jekyll and Mr. Hyde
- Balada Triste de Trompeta" (The Last Circus) (2010) – As himself, through use of Sin Un Adiós footage
- Mi Gran Noche (2015) – As Alphonso

== Tours ==
- De vuelta Tour (2003–2004)
- Raphael Para todos Tour (2005)
- Más cerca de ti Tour (2007–2008)
- 50 años después Tour (2009–2010)
- Te llevo en el corazón Tour (2010–2011)
- El reencuentro Tour (2012)
- Mi gran noche Tour (2013–2014)
- De Amor y Desamor Tour (2014–2015)
- Raphael Sinphonico World Tour (2015–2016)
- Loco por Cantar World Tour (2017–2018)
- Raphael RESinphónico World Tour (2018–2020)
- Raphael 6.0: 60 años sobre los escenarios (2020–2022)
- Raphael Tour 6.0 In America (2022)
- Tour Victoria (2022–)

== Raphael Museum ==
The Raphael Museum is located in El Pósito, a building in the centre of Linares. It houses more than 400 pieces and original documents from the artist.

== See also ==
- List of best-selling Latin music artists

== Notes ==
| Preceded by Conchita Bautista with "Qué bueno, qué bueno" | Spain in the Eurovision Song Contest; 1966 with "Yo soy aquél" 1967 with "Hablemos del amor" | Succeeded by Massiel with "La, la, la" |
