= José Luis Perales =

Spanish singer (born 1945)

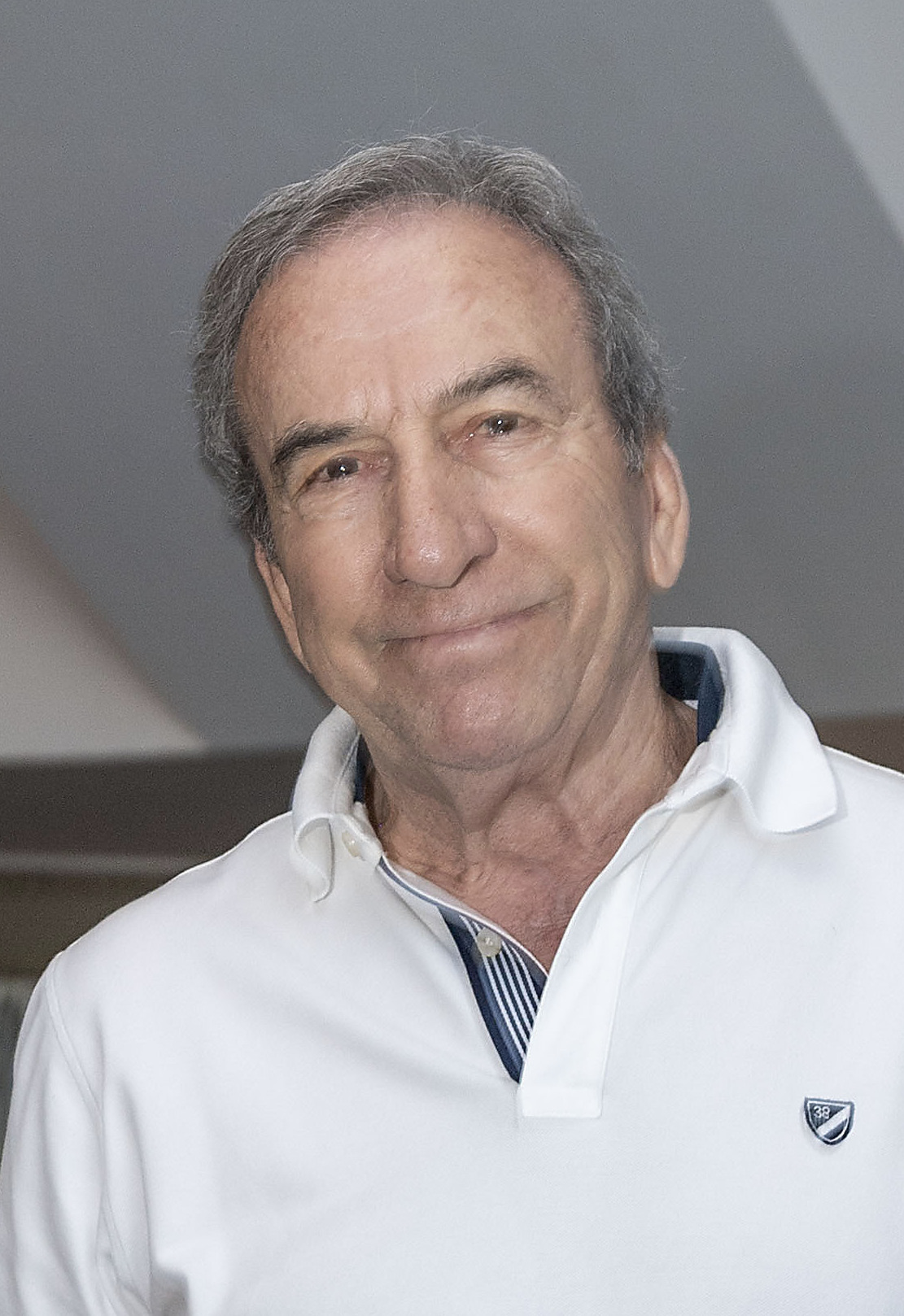
- Perales in 2019

Background information
- Born: José Luis Perales Morillas; 18 January 1945 (age 81); Castejón, Cuenca, Spain
- Genres: Latin pop
- Occupations: Singer, songwriter, composer
- Years active: 1973–present
- Labels: Hispavox, Sony/BMG, Columbia
- Website: joseluisperales.net

José Luis Perales Morillas (born 18 January 1945) is a Spanish singer, songwriter and producer. He has recorded 27 albums and 30 million copies sold worldwide. His compositions have been recorded by singers such as Vikki Carr, Bertín Osborne, Raphael, Rocío Jurado, Jeanette, Miguel Bosé, Daniela Romo, Isabel Pantoja, Julio Iglesias, Paloma San Basilio, Mocedades, La Oreja de Van Gogh, Ricardo Montaner and Marc Anthony, among others.

Perales has performed concerts in Uruguay, Mexico, Venezuela, Colombia, Argentina, Chile, Guatemala, Costa Rica, Puerto Rico, Dominican Republic, United States, Brazil, Italy, France, and Portugal. His most popular singles are "Quisiera Decir tu Nombre", "¿Y cómo es él?" and "¿Qué Pasará Mañana?". His song "Porque te vas", made popular by Jeanette, has been covered by more than 40 artists in France, Germany, England and Japan, until 2004.

== Biography ==
=== Early years ===
José Luis Perales was born in the town of Castejón, 65 kilometres from the city of Cuenca, into a traditional Catholic family. From a very early age, he showed a devotion to music and learned to play the lute from a former teacher, which led him to start playing the lute at the age of 6.

He wrote his first compositions at the age of 14. However, he did not present his songs to record companies until 1968 (when he was 23): "They [people in the music world] were the ones who presented my songs to their record companies because I was terribly embarrassed to go there in person. I was shy and afraid of failing," said Perales.

He spent the first 16 years of his life in his hometown, until 1961, when he moved to Seville with Adrián Sevilla to study for an industrial master's degree in electronics at the Universidad Laboral de Sevilla. After graduating, he moved to Madrid to study surveying, combining his studies with work as an electrician and boot cleaner. While still a student, he began to write songs, at first only for other performers, until producer Rafael Trabucchelli convinced him to record his own songs. He also composed for other artists.

It was at this training centre that he signed up for the tuna. "As the companies didn't want to employ anyone of military age, I had to wait until I'd finished serving. Then I went to work in a factory as an industrial electrician. The first thing they told me was that even though I had a degree, I didn't know anything about it, that there were people there who had been working with pliers for twenty years. I continued to compose in my spare time and gradually began to sell songs. Fórmula V, Basilio, Jeanette, Dúo Yerbabuena, Paloma San Basilio and Miguel Bosé, among others, recorded my songs. At some point they found out that I had a couple of songs that I hadn't given to anybody, that I considered them to be very much my own, and that they were sitting there waiting for something to happen. They listened to them and asked me to sing them. And my time as a singer began. But it was a bit forced, because it seemed to me to be a very complicated job. And that's how I entered this world. To be honest, I was scared. And little by little I got used to it, but as I said before, I kept myself pretty much on the sidelines. And the truth is that I don't really believe everything people say to me. When I'm voted best singer of the year, I'm surprised. My opinion of myself is lower than the opinion that people have of me, but I have confidence in myself, or at least I'm gaining confidence in myself," he said. He added: "I don't believe everything that people say about me.

While listening to the radio, he was inspired to compose, and so one of his first melodies was born, "Niebla", not very mature yet, but which would mark the beginning of a long journey in which José Luis clearly saw his true dedication: music. He did military service in Madrid. In spite of this, he had a scholarship and had to continue his studies as a surveyor, which he combined with his work as a draughtsman in a company of the Spanish National Institute of Industry (INI). Waiting for an interpreter interested in his songs, he wrote dozens of compositions.

His first work, "En San Marcos", was sung by Madrilenian singer Daniel Velázquez on the double single "El Padrino/El milagro del amor", released by Philips Records in 1972 and printed on the B-side. It was the first time his name had appeared on vinyl. On this track, Perales describes the beauties of Venice.

Perales composed "Porque te vas", which was performed by Jeanette and sold 4 million copies worldwide in 1976. His first record, "Celos de mi Guitarra" (Jealous of my Guitar) was a success in Spain and in Latin America.

On 18 February 2019 he received the Medalla de Oro al Mérito en las Bellas Artes.

Around 2020, his song Un Velero Llamado Libertad was used for a series of memes on TikTok. Those memes were called "Y SE MARCHÓ", after some lyrics in the song.

== Discography ==
- 1973 – Mis Canciones (My Songs)
- 1974 – El Pregón (The Pregon)
- 1975 – Para Vosotros Canto (For You I Sing)
- 1976 – Por Si Quieres Conocerme (In Case You Want To Know Me)
- 1978 – Como La Lluvia Fresca (Like Fresh Rain)
- 1978 – Soledades (Solitudes); only released in Latin America
- 1979 – Tiempo de Otoño (Autumn Weather)
- 1981 – Nido de Águilas (Eagle's Nest)
- 1982 – Entre el Agua y el Fuego (Between the Water and the Fire)
- 1984 – Amaneciendo En Ti (Waking Up to You)
- 1986 – Con El Paso Del Tiempo (With the Passage of Time)
- 1988 – Sueño De Libertad (Dream of Freedom)
- 1989 – La Espera (The Wait)
- 1990 – A Mis Amigos (To My Friends)
- 1991 – América (America)
- 1993 – Gente Maravillosa (Wonderful People)
- 1996 – En Clave De Amor (In the Key of Love)
- 1998 – Quédate Conmigo (Stay With Me)
- 2000 – Me Han Contado Que Existe Un Paraíso (I've Been Told There Exists a Paradise)
- 2006 – Navegando Por Ti (Sailing Across You)
- 2012 – Calle Soledad (Loneliness Street)
- 2016 – Calma (Calm)

== See also ==
- List of best-selling Latin music artists
