= List of awards and nominations received by Raphael =

List of some of the most important awards won by Spanish artist Raphael.

== Awards, citations and honors ==
- Nominated – Commendator of the Order of Isabel the Catholic

(granted by H.R.H. King Juan Carlos I of Spain). (1987)

- Named Most Illustrious Lord of the Order of Cisneros (Raphael is therefore a marquess within Spanish nobility)
- Inducted into the International Latin Music Hall of Fame in 2003.
- Living Legend Award at the 5th Annual La Musa Awards (2018).
- Gold Medal of the Community of Madrid. (2019)
- Lo Nuestro Excellence Award (2020)
- Billboard Latin Music Lifetime Achievement Award (2022)
- 2 Quijote de Oro Award from TVE (Televisión Española) (1975)
- Honor to four decades of success in the world (Spain, 2006)
- "Honor Award from the Music Academy" to four decades of success in the world (Spain, 2006).
- "Golden Medal" from the "Círculo de Bellas Artes" (Spain, 2006).
- "Golden Medal of Andalusia" (Spain, 2007).
- Named "Most Illustrious Lord of the Order of Cisneros" (Raphael is therefore a marquess within Spanish nobility)
- Elected 4 times as "Popular" (artist) by the readers of Diario Pueblo, (Madrid).
- 3 times chosen "Super Popular" by readers, Diario Pueblo, (Madrid).
- 4 "Aplauso" awards.
- 7 "Olé of the Song" Awards, (Barcelona).
- 3 "Heraldos de Mexico" (Highest award given to singers in Mexico).
- "Rafael Guinad" Award (Venezuela).
- "Hoja de Plata" Award (Madrid).
- 2 "Quijote de Oro" Awards from Spanish television.
- "Golden Medal" from the "Círculo de Escritores" of Madrid.
- 6 times "Champion Best-sellers of Discs".
- 4 "ACE" Awards to the "Best concert of the year", given by the "Asociación de Críticos de Espectáculos" (New York).
- 2 "El Sol Azteca" Awards (México).
- "Golden Disc to the Best Singer" in Middem (Cannes, Francia).
- 4 "Guaicaipuro de Oro" Awards (Venezuela).
- Award to the "Best Pop Singer in Spanish".
- Award from "Sindicato Nacional del Espectáculo".
- "Golden Medal and Diamonds" from "Departamento de Turismo" (México).
- 5 "Silver Torches", 2 "Golden Torches" and 1 "Silver Gull" at "Viña del Mar Festival of Song and Music" (Chile).
- Named as "Favorite Son" of: México, Colombia, Ecuador, Chile, Argentina, Venezuela and Perú.
- Awarded the "Key to the City" in New York City, Los Angeles, Chicago and Miami (5 times).
- Named "Español Universal" by the "Cámara de Comercio Española" in Miami.
- Named "Andaluz Universal" by "Andalucía en el Mundo" Magazine .
- "Gold Medal to the Merit in the Work "(Spain).
- Star with his name in "Hall of Fame Avenue" (Los Angeles).
- 'Golden Star' Award granted by the "Club of Means" in recognition to his long and consolidated professional trajectory.
- "Shangay" Special Award.
- “Hipódromo de la Américas" Award to his international artistic trajectory (México).
- "Jiennense 2004" Award.
- "Linarense 2004" Award.
- "Júbilo 2005" Award.
- "Luna del Auditorio" to the Best Crooner Concert 2006 (México).
- "Plate of bronze" in "Paseo de las Lunas" (México, 2006).
- The first color television broadcast in Puerto Rico, aired in 1969, was a live concert by Raphael.´
- 2 Streets in Spain were given his name, one in Linares -his natal city- (Jaén) and the other in Estepona (Málaga).

== Grammy Awards ==
- Best Mexican/Mexican-American Performance: Eternamente Tuyo - 1985 (Nominated)
- Best Latin Pop Performance: Las Apariencias Engañan - 1989 (Nominated)
- Best Latin Pop Album: Ave Fénix (Nominated) - 1993

== Friend of the Musical Spanish Industry Award ==
- Honor to his artistic career (1999)
