= List of number-one hits of 1977 (Germany) =

The official German singles chart ranks the best-performing songs in Germany. Back in 1977, its data was compiled by Media Control on behalf of Bundesverband der Phonographischen Wirtschaft (BPW) and published in Musikmarkt each Monday.

== Chart history ==
Issue date	Title	Artist(s)	Ref.
3 January	"Money, Money, Money"	ABBA	
10 January	"Money, Money, Money"	ABBA	
17 January	"Money, Money, Money"	ABBA	
24 January	"Sunny"	Boney M.	
31 January	"Sunny"	Boney M.	
7 February	"Living Next Door to Alice"	Smokie	
14 February	"Living Next Door to Alice"	Smokie	
21 February	"Living Next Door to Alice"	Smokie	
28 February	"Living Next Door to Alice"	Smokie	
7 March	"Living Next Door to Alice"	Smokie	
14 March	"Living Next Door to Alice"	Smokie	
21 March	"Living Next Door to Alice"	Smokie	
28 March	"Living Next Door to Alice"	Smokie	
4 April	"Living Next Door to Alice"	Smokie	
11 April	"Knowing Me, Knowing You"	ABBA	
18 April	"Knowing Me, Knowing You"	ABBA	
25 April	"Lay Back in the Arms of Someone"	Smokie	
2 May	"Porque te Vas"	Jeanette	
9 May	"Lay Back in the Arms of Someone"	Smokie	
16 May	"Lay Back in the Arms of Someone"	Smokie	
23 May	"Lay Back in the Arms of Someone"	Smokie	
30 May	"Orzowei"	Oliver Onions	
6 June	"Lay Back in the Arms of Someone"	Smokie	
13 June	"Ma Baker"	Boney M.	
20 June	"Ma Baker"	Boney M.	
27 June	"Ma Baker"	Boney M.	
4 July	"Yes Sir, I Can Boogie"	Baccara	
11 July	"Yes Sir, I Can Boogie"	Baccara	
18 July	"Yes Sir, I Can Boogie"	Baccara	
25 July	"Yes Sir, I Can Boogie"	Baccara	
1 August	"Yes Sir, I Can Boogie"	Baccara	
8 August	"Yes Sir, I Can Boogie"	Baccara	
15 August	"Yes Sir, I Can Boogie"	Baccara	
22 August	"Yes Sir, I Can Boogie"	Baccara	
29 August	"Magic Fly"	Space	
5 September	"Sorry, I'm a Lady"	Baccara	
12 September	"Sorry, I'm a Lady"	Baccara	
19 September	"Sorry, I'm a Lady"	Baccara	
26 September	"Sorry, I'm a Lady"	Baccara	
3 October	"Sorry, I'm a Lady"	Baccara	
10 October	"Sorry, I'm a Lady"	Baccara	
17 October	"Sorry, I'm a Lady"	Baccara	
24 October	"Belfast"	Boney M.	
31 October	"Belfast"	Boney M.	
7 November	"Belfast"	Boney M.	
14 November	"Belfast"	Boney M.	
21 November	"Don't Let Me Be Misunderstood"	Santa Esmeralda	
28 November	"Don't Let Me Be Misunderstood"	Santa Esmeralda	
5 December	"Don't Let Me Be Misunderstood"	Santa Esmeralda	
12 December	"Don't Let Me Be Misunderstood"	Santa Esmeralda	
19 December	"Don't Let Me Be Misunderstood"	Santa Esmeralda	
26 December	"Don't Let Me Be Misunderstood"	Santa Esmeralda	

== See also ==
- List of number-one hits (Germany)
