= Jeanette (Spanish singer) =

British-born Spanish singer (born 1951)

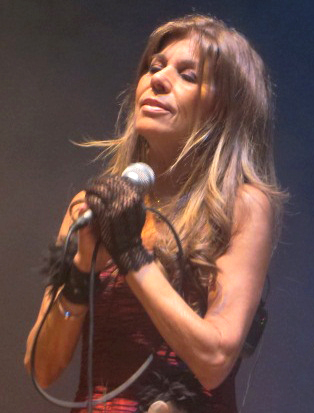
- Jeanette performing in 2014

Background information
- Born: Janette Anne Dimech; 10 October 1951 (age 75); Willesden, Middlesex, England
- Genres: Canción melódica; pop
- Occupation: Musician • singer-songwriter
- Instrument: Vocals
- Years active: 1968–1985, 1989–present
- Labels: Hispavox; Ariola; RCA Victor; Producciones Twins; EMI

Janette Anne Dimech (born 10 October 1951), known professionally as Jeanette, is a British-born Spanish singer-songwriter. She first rose to prominence as the lead singer of Pic-Nic, a teenage folk-pop band that found success in 1968 with her song "Cállate, niña". Jeanette returned as a solo artist in 1971 with the Hispavox single "Soy rebelde", which redefined her career as a romantic balladist and was a hit across the Spanish-speaking world, becoming a generational anthem.

In 1976, Carlos Saura included Jeanette's 1974 song "Porque te vas" in his film Cría cuervos, which propelled it to become a major hit and one of the most famous Spanish pop songs of all time and origined many versions of it in other languages, the most famous one being Russian "В Последний Раз (For the Last Time)". After the international success of "Porque te vas", Jeanette worked in France and Germany until she returned to the Spanish market with the 1981 album Corazón de poeta, which includes several of her most famous songs. The commercial reception of Corazón de poeta allowed her to record two more albums with RCA Victor—Reluz in 1983 and Ojos en el sol in 1984—which were unsuccessful. Her last studio album, Loca por la música, was released in 1989 on independent record label Twins and sought to reinvent her style with techno-pop influences.

The figure of Jeanette has been revalued in the 21st century and she is now considered a cult artist and an influence on Spanish-language indie pop. In 2010, 20 minutos described Jeanette as "a legend of Spanish music and muse of independent pop".

== Biography ==
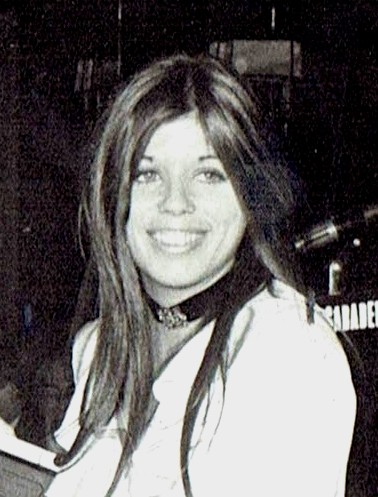
Jeanette in 1973

Jeanette was born in Willesden, Middlesex, England, on October 10, 1951. Dimech's father is of Maltese descent and lived in the Belgian Congo, and her Spanish mother was originally from Tenerife, the Canary Islands. Because of her grandparents' import-export business, she was born in the London suburb of Willesden, and grew up in Chicago and La Habra, California. After her parents' separation when she was 12, she moved to Barcelona with her mother and younger brother and sister. Having grown up in the United States, she spoke only English when she first moved to Spain. She was placed in an American school at first, but later befriended some local Spanish children who helped her learn Spanish.

After her band, Pic-Nic split up at the end of the 1960s, Jeanette moved to Vienna with her husband, Hungarian football player László Kristof, and lived quietly as a homemaker and the mother of their only child, Blythe.

== Pic-Nic ==
During the 1960s Jeanette learned to play guitar and began to write her own songs. She styled her music after American folk music, and her idols included Bob Dylan, Donovan, and the Byrds. Later she joined the student band Pic-Nic as a singer, and in 1967 they had a measure of success with a folk version of the Spanish children's song "Cállate, niña" (in which Jeanette had co-written). Other notable songs of theirs included "Amanecer" and "No digas nada". However, constant disagreements among members, such as whether or not to record English versions of their songs, ended with the dissolution of the group.

== Palabras, promesas ==
After the dissolution of Pic-Nic, Jeanette resumed with her own life, but overnight received a call from her former record label Hispavox, the same label she was on during her tenure with Pic-Nic. This time the label said that they had a project for a singer and Jeanette must be part of it. She came back to Spain and to music. Jeanette settled in Barcelona in 1971 to start her solo career. At the start of the 1970s, she began her solo career with her hit first single, "Soy Rebelde" ("I am a rebel"). On the single, the record label misspelt her name as "Jeanette" (her correct spelling is Janette without the first "e".) Ever since then, her stage name has been spelt with the additional "e". The single first enjoyed success in Spanish-speaking countries and later broadened its influence with French ("L'inconnu qui m'aimera"), Japanese ("あまのじゃく") and English versions. This song and others penned by Manuel Alejandro, such as "Estoy triste" and "Oye mamá, oye papá" ("Listen mama, listen papa"), established her as an artist in Spain. Palabras, promesas ("Words, promises"), written by José Luis Perales was released in 1973. In this LP all the singles were released and recorded from 1971 to 1973.

== "Porque te vas" ==
Her greatest success, "Porque te vas" (Because you are leaving), written by José Luis Perales, became an international hit when the song was used in Carlos Saura's 1976 film Cría Cuervos (Raise Ravens). In Austria it reached number 13, in Switzerland number 4, and in Germany reached number 1. On 12 February 1977, Jeanette sang the song in the popular German program Musikladen (programme 31). The song also enjoyed popularity in Russia; still often heard on Retro FM, a nationwide Russian station. It was, and still is, often heard on the national radio in Poland. The song had been released in Spain two years prior to the movie with moderate success. It was its inclusion in the movie that made it a success.

== Todo es nuevo ==
Jeanette worked with famous French composer André Popp for the production of her album Todo es nuevo (Everything is new) in 1977. There were two versions: Spanish and French. The album received a lukewarm reception, but the song "¿Por qué voy a cambiar?" (Why Should I Change?) (Tzeinerlin' in French) also appeared in the German programme Musikladen (programme 35, 8 October 1977). This song ("¿Por qué voy a cambiar?") was a cover version of Years may come, years may go by Herman's Hermits.

== Corazón de poeta ==
In 1981 she recorded her best-selling album to date, Corazón de poeta, which was composed, arranged and conducted by Manuel Alejandro, and gave her three hit singles: "Corazón de poeta" (literally "Heart of a Poet" but translated as "A heart so warm and so tender"), "Frente a Frente" (literally "Face to Face" but translated as "Sorrow") and "El muchacho de los ojos tristes" ("The Young Man With The Sad Eyes"). Especially as a vintage album, it sold millions worldwide, triumphing across borders, in several Latin American countries. In Spain it was the number-one album for a week; of the singles, "Frente a frente" reached #4 during a 20 weeks run on the charts, and "Corazón de poeta" reached #13 during its 10 weeks on the charts.

In the next several years she released the albums Reluz (1983), Ojos en el Sol (1984), and Loca por la Música (1989), along with a string of singles. Her sales then declined, though she herself remained popular and her back catalogue was re-packaged into a continual stream of greatest-hits collections.

== Discography ==
=== Singles ===
- 1971: "Soy Rebelde / Oye Mamá, Oye Papá"
- 1972: "あまのじゃく (Amanojaku) / Listen Mama, Listen Papa"
- 1972: "Estoy Triste / No Digas Nada"
- 1973: "Palabras, Promesas / Debajo Del Platanero"
- 1974: "Porque Te Vas / Seguiré Amando"
- 1975: "Vengo De Un Sueño De Amor / Noches De Samba"
- 1975: "Hoy Nos Hemos Dicho Adiós / El Mundo Con Amor"
- 1976: "Il Me Plait Bien Ton Frère / Amis, Amis"
- 1976: "Je Suis Triste / L'inconnu Qui M'aimera"
- 1977: "Todo Es Nuevo/ Pequeña Preciosa (Precious Little)"
- 1978: "Voy A Tener Un Niño/ De Mujer A Mujer"
- 1978: "Don't Say Goodnight To A Lady Of Spain / Heaven Please Don't Let It Rain Tonight"
- 1979: "Little Man From Japan / Las Brisas"
- 1980: "Valley Of Love / Summer Holiday"
- 1981: "Sorrow / A Heart So Warm And So Tender"
- 2026: "Hoy Vuelvo Más Rebelde / Amo A La Vida"

=== Álbumes ===
- 1973: Palabras, Promesas...
- 1976: Porque Te Vas
- 1977: Todo Es Nuevo
- 1981: Corazón De Poeta
- 1983: Reluz
- 1984: Ojos En El Sol
- 1988: Loca Por La Música

=== Duetos ===
- 1976: Instrucciones A La Población Civil (feat. Miguel Ríos)
- 2001: Yes Sir, I Can Boogie (Bailando Boogie) (feat. Raphael)
- 2004: La P*** Canción De Amor En La Que El Chico Gana (feat. Miqui Puig)
- 2005: CD Virgen (feat. Raül Refree)
- 2013: Una Moneda (feat. Coque Malla)
- 2016: Acaríciame / Toda La Noche Oliendo A Ti (feat. Juan Bau)
- 2019: L'Amour Joue Au Violon (feat. Bon Entendeur)
- 2024: Porqué Te Vas (feat. Agrupación Euphoria)
- 2025: Como Un Cristal (feat. Lucas Bun)
