= Géraldine Beigbeder =

French writer

Géraldine Beigbeder is a Paris-based novelist, screen writer, visual artist and designer. She is also the European curator of British rock musician Pete Doherty's paintings.

Beigbeder's best known novels are Sponsors (Editions Ramsay, 2007) and Larguée en périphérie de la zone politique et autres petits désordres organiques (Albin Michel, 2011).

She has written screenplays with Jean-Luc Azoulay and created sitcoms for TF1, France 2 and M6.
