= Cría Cuervos =

1976 Spanish psychological drama film by Carlos Saura

- Film poster
- Directed by: Carlos Saura
- Written by: Carlos Saura
- Produced by: Elías Querejeta
- Starring: Ana Torrent; Geraldine Chaplin; Mónica Randall; Héctor Alterio; Florinda Chico; Conchi Perez; Mayte Sanchez
- Cinematography: Teo Escamilla
- Edited by: Pablo González del Amo
- Release date: 26 January 1976
- Running time: 107 minutes
- Country: Spain
- Language: Spanish

Cría cuervos (Spanish: [ˈkɾi.a ˈkweɾβos], also written Cría cuervos…; lit. 'Raise crows') is a 1976 Spanish psychological drama film written and directed by Carlos Saura and produced by Elías Querejeta. The film is an allegorical drama about an eight-year-old girl dealing with her troubled childhood. It stars Geraldine Chaplin and Ana Torrent and co-stars Mónica Randall, Conchi Perez, Mayte Sanchez, Florinda Chico and Héctor Alterio.

Highly acclaimed, it received the Grand Prix at the 1976 Cannes Film Festival. It also was selected as the Spanish entry for the Best Foreign Language Film at the 49th Academy Awards, but was not accepted as a nominee. Nowadays the movie is regarded as Carlos Saura's greatest masterpiece, one of the best movies of 1976, of the 1970s, of the 20th century and one of best and greatest classics of Spanish cinema.

== Plot ==
The events of the film are set mainly in 1975, but interweave the past, present and future.

Eight-year-old Ana overhears her father, Anselmo, in bed with a woman, followed by choking sounds. The woman rushes out alone and leaves. Ana finds her father dead in bed, apparently from a heart attack. Calmly, Ana removes a half-full glass of milk from the dresser, carries it to the kitchen, and washes it. Ana's mother, María, enters the kitchen and chides her for being up so late. It is revealed shortly that Ana is imagining her mother, who previously died of an incurable illness.

At Anselmo's wake, Ana again sees the woman who fled the bedroom - Amelia, who is married to Nicolás, a longtime army compatriot of Anselmo's. (It is mentioned later that the two men had served in División Azul, volunteering to fight alongside the Nazis in World War II.) Although Ana views her father's body, she refuses to kiss his forehead when prompted by the adults.

Upon returning home from the wake, Ana goes into the basement and retrieves a tin containing a white powder. The camera pans to an adult Ana, who looks exactly like María and begins to address the camera. She explains that her mother had once told her the powder was a potent poison, and that she was told to get rid of it which she didn't. After her mother's death, she came to the conclusion that her father's cruelty had caused all of her mother's suffering and illness. Ana admits thinking about killing her father but whether she had really done it remains a mystery.

Ana, who is on summer vacation from school, lives in a large, quiet house with her older sister, Irene and a younger one, Maite; her grandmother, who is mute and a wheelchair user; Roni, a pet guinea pig; and Rosa, the vivacious family maid and Ana's closest companion. Following the funeral, María's sister Paulina becomes the orphaned children's guardian and moves in. Flashbacks reveal that María was a warm and imaginative mother; in contrast, Paulina is stern and patronizing.

Ana rebels against her aunt's authoritarianism while routinely reliving memories of life with her mother and imagining her presence. Many of the memories are distressing, including witnessing María writhing in pain in her final days. In another, Ana watches her parents argue late at night. María begs Anselmo to be more present in his family's life, saying that she is sick and wants to die; Anselmo dismisses her coldly, countering that she is trying to manipulate him into ending his infidelities by feigning illness.

Growing increasingly despondent, present-day Ana offers to help her grandmother die by administering the same poison powder she used to kill her father, which her grandmother accepts, but then declines once Ana shows her the tin and it reads sodium bicarbonate. Later, Ana discovers Roni dying and strokes him until he goes still. Nicolás comes to the house to visit Paulina, who is revealed to be his mistress. Ana, holding a pistol she found in her father's study, walks in on an intimate moment between the two adults. Nicolás eventually persuades her to hand him the gun, and discovers that it was loaded.

That night, Ana attempts to kill Paulina by dissolving the "poison" in a glass of milk, which she later retrieves and washes as she did her father's glass. Ana then enters Paulina's bedroom and strokes her hair as she lies asleep in bed. Ana is briefly shocked that Paulina is alive the next morning. At breakfast, Irene recounts a dream from the night before: two men kidnapped her and couldn't reach María and Anselmo for ransom, but when they were about to kill her, she woke up. The sisters leave for school, emerging from their cloistered lives into the vibrant, noisy city, captured in a long tracking shot that contrasts with the tighter framing of the preceding scenes.

== Cast ==
Ana Torrent plays the lead character, Ana. She was already well known thanks to her starring role in the film El espíritu de la colmena (The Spirit of the Beehive) (1973) by Víctor Erice, made when she was seven years old. She followed Cría Cuervos with yet another memorable role in The Nest (1980) in which she played a 13-year-old in a relationship with an aging widower played by Héctor Alterio, who in this film has the role of Anselmo, Ana's father.

Geraldine Chaplin plays dual roles: Ana's mother María, in which she speaks Spanish with an English accent and Ana as a young woman in which she is dubbed by actress Julieta Serrano. Chaplin was director Saura's common-law wife and muse at that time. She appeared in 10 of his films.

- Ana Torrent as Ana, age 8
- Conchi Pérez as Irene, age 11
- Maite Sánchez as Maite, age 5
- Geraldine Chaplin as Ana's mother (María) and older Ana
- Mónica Randall as Aunt Paulina
- Florinda Chico as Rosa, a maid
- Josefina Díaz as Ana's grandmother
- Héctor Alterio as Anselmo, Ana's father
- Mirta Miller as Amelia, Anselmo's mistress
- Germán Cobos as Nicolás, Amelia's husband

== Title ==
The title Cría Cuervos comes from the Spanish proverb, "Cría cuervos y te sacarán los ojos". This translates as, "Raise ravens, and they'll gouge your eyes out" and is generally used for someone who has bad luck in raising children, or raising them badly. It may also imply rebellious behavior of youth or that every good act will return to haunt you.

The phrase "Cría cuervos y te sacarán los ojos" is said to originate with Don Álvaro de Luna of Castile during a hunting expedition. In the course of the hunt his party came across a beggar with terrible scarring in the place of eyes. The beggar explained that he had raised a raven for three years with affection and great care, but it attacked him one day, leaving him blind. The bon mot was Don Álvaro's reply.

Cría Cuervos was originally released as Cría! in the United States and as Raise Ravens in the UK, but the original title Cría Cuervos is now used in both countries.

== Analysis ==
This film was made during a period where Carlos Saura was considered one of the great opponents, along with other directors, of the Francoist Spain, with characters and themes in the film alluding to Saura's interpretations and criticisms of Franco-inspired truths.

The film stresses the disparity between Ana's inner world of private traumas and the outer world of political realities and the Francoist State. Ana will cope with her guilt in both arenas.

When asked to elucidate the nature of Ana's suffering, the director replied: "Cría Cuervos is a sad film, yes. But that's part of my belief that childhood is one of the most terrible parts in the life of a human being. What I'm trying to say is that at that age you've no idea where it is you are going, only that people are taking you somewhere, leading you, pulling you and you are frightened. You don't know where you're going or who you are or what you are going to do. It's a time of terrible indecision."

== Release ==
Cría Cuervos was shot in the summer of 1975, as Spanish leader Francisco Franco lay dying, and premiered in Madrid's Conde Duque Theatre, on January 26, 1976.

== Reception ==
=== Box office ===
Cría Cuervos became director Carlos Saura and producer Elías Querejeta's most commercially successful film up to that point, going on to become the sixth largest grossing Spanish film of 1976. The picture made a similar strong showing in foreign markets, including the United States, where it solidified Saura's reputation as Spain's best internationally known director of the 1970s.

=== Critical response ===
Today Cría Cuervos is considered a political, philosophical and psychological masterpiece and a classic of Spanish cinema.

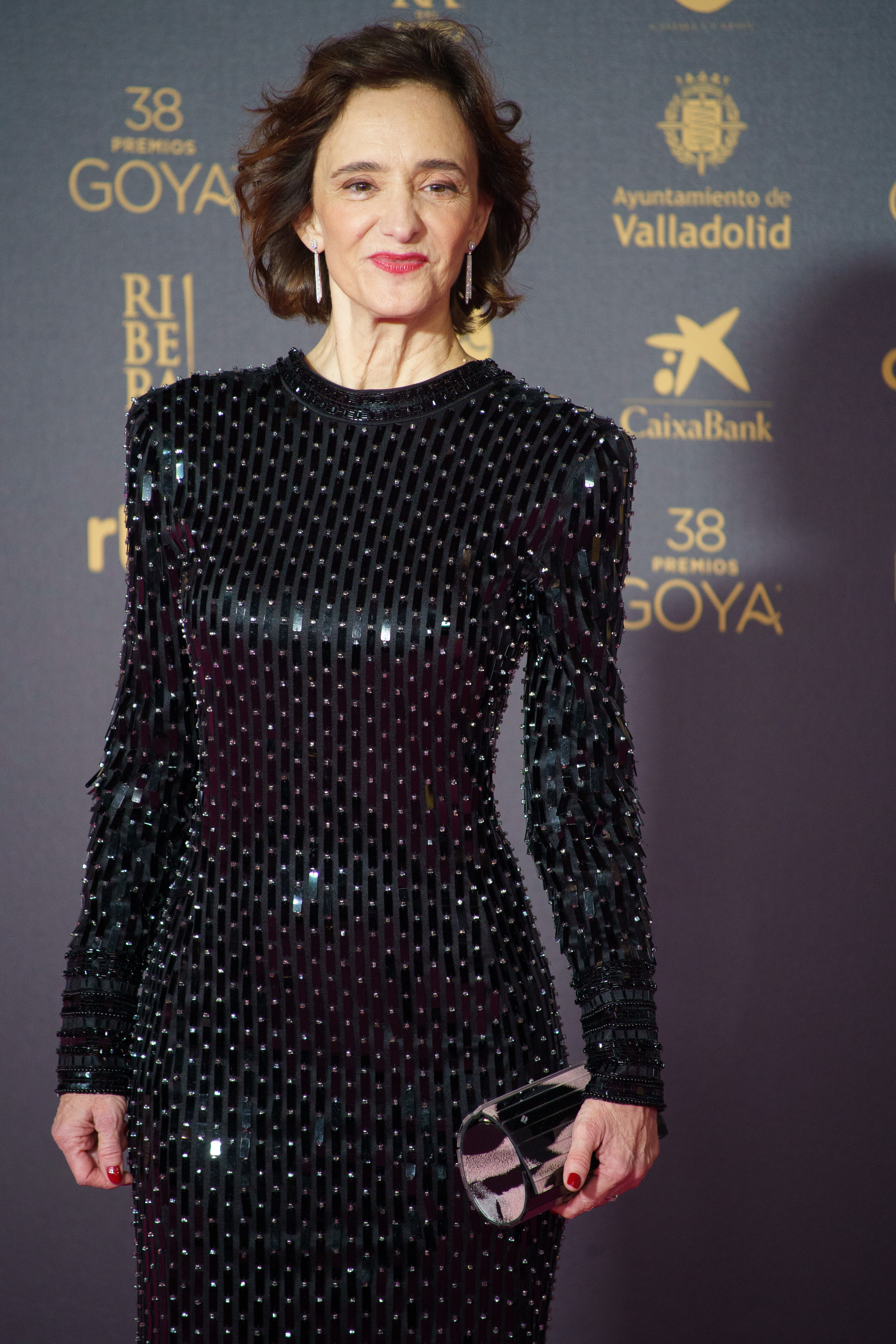
Ana Torrent on the red carpet of the 2024 Goya Awards in Valladolid.

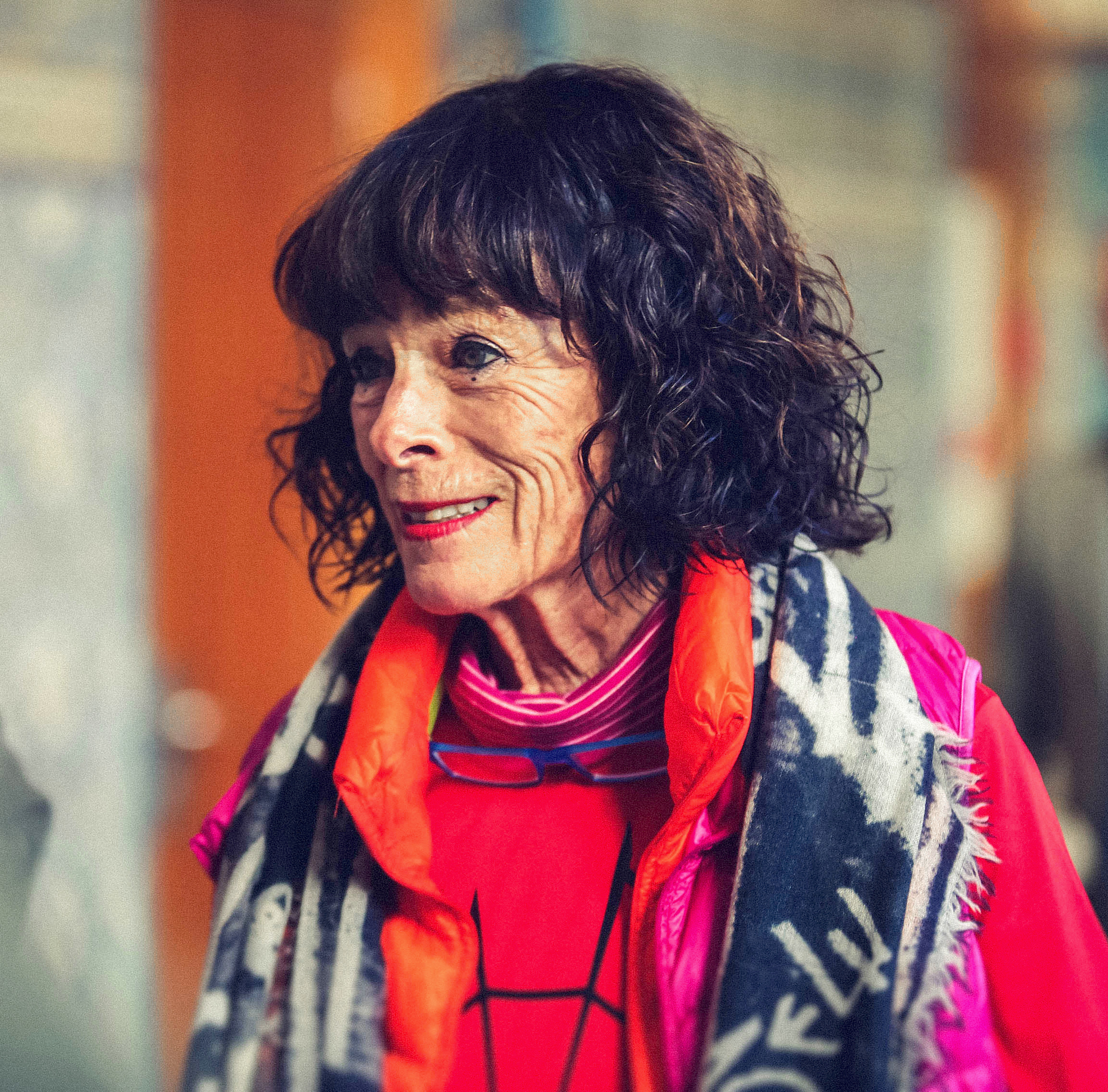
The performances of Ana Torrent and Geraldine Chaplin were met with widespread critical acclaim with Torrent's portrayal being regarded as one of the finest child acting in movie history.

Cría Cuervos has an approval rating of 100% on Rotten Tomatoes, based on 18 reviews, and an average rating of 8.3/10.

=== Awards and nominations ===
Highly acclaimed, Cría Cuervos received the Cannes Film Festival's Grand Prix. The film was selected as the Spanish entry for the Best Foreign Language Film at the 49th Academy Awards, but was not accepted as a nominee. It was, however, nominated for Best Foreign Language Film by the U.S. National Board of Review.

== Music ==
The film prominently features the pop song "Porque te vas" by Jeanette, an English-born singer, singing in Spanish, whose accented voice reminds Ana of her mother, as played by Geraldine Chaplin, who speaks Spanish with her English-accented voice. Despite an infectious rhythm the song has sad and poignant lyrics. The song expresses the fact that Ana has no understanding of death, only of absence.

== DVD release ==
Cría Cuervos was released on DVD on August 14, 2007 in a two-disc special edition as part of the Criterion Collection.

The film was released on Blu-ray in a Dual Format Edition on May 27, 2013, by the BFI.

== See also ==
- List of submissions to the 49th Academy Awards for Best Foreign Language Film
- List of Spanish submissions for the Academy Award for Best Foreign Language Film
