= Germán Álvarez Beigbeder =

Spanish composer (1882–1968)

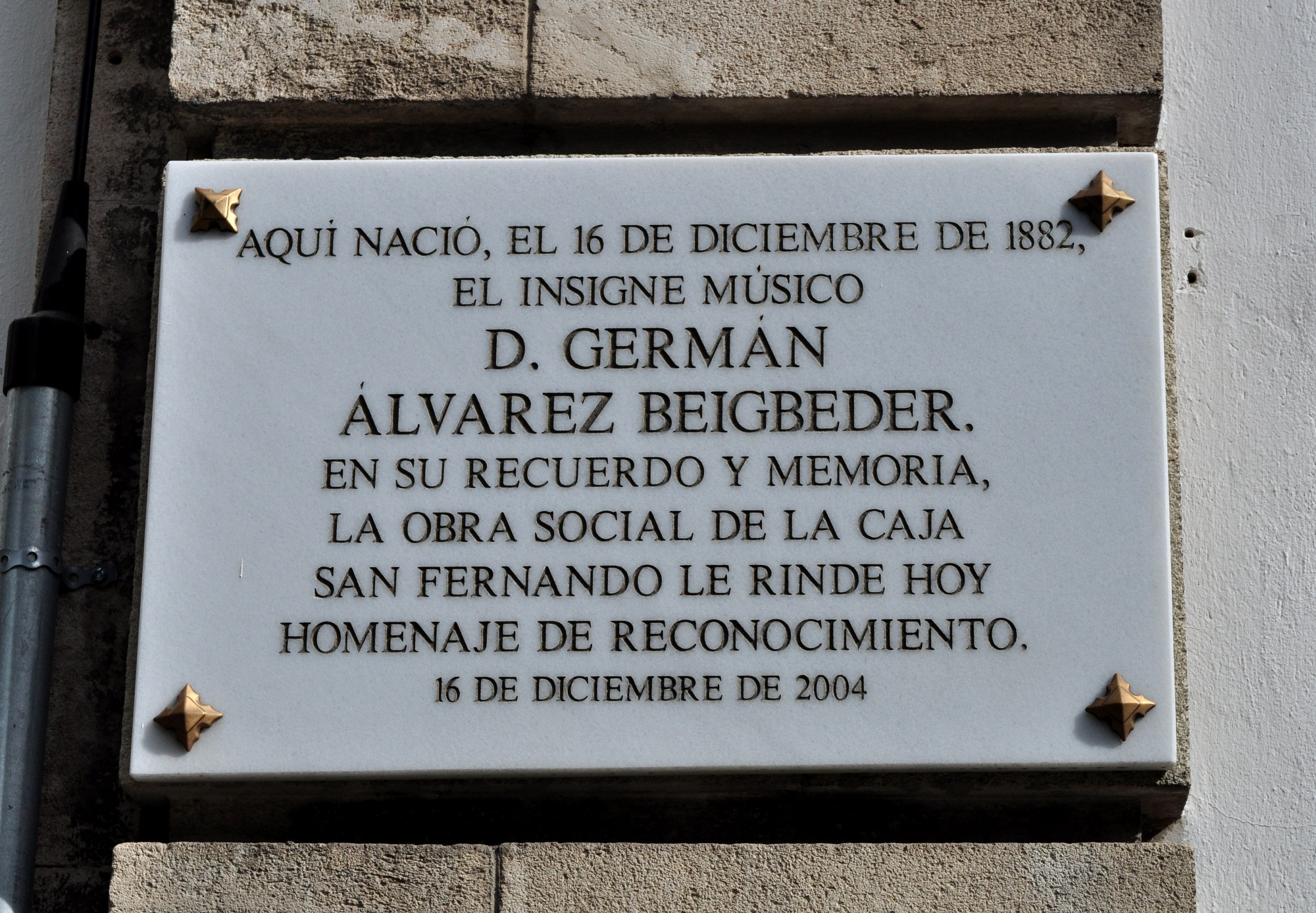

Germán Álvarez Beigbeder (15 December 1882 – 11 October 1968) was a Spanish composer, and father of the composer Manuel Alejandro (born as Manuel Álvarez-Beigbeder Pérez in 1932).
