= Los Pekenikes =

Spanish pop music group

Los Pekenikes were a primarily instrumental Spanish pop group of the 1960s signed to Hispavox. In 1967, Spain's national radio station selected the group to represent Spain in the Juan-Antoine de Triomphe Variete Festival promoted by French radio stations.

In 1970/'71, the group had an international hit with the single "Tren transoceánico a Bucaramanga".
