= Hispavox =

Major Spanish record label and company

Hispavox S.A.
- Company type: Private
- Industry: Music
- Founded: 27 June 1953; 72 years ago
- Founder: José Manuel Vidal Zapater
- Fate: Acquired by EMI in 1985
- Headquarters: Torrelaguna 64, Madrid, Spain
- Area served: Worldwide

Hispavox S.A. was a major Spanish record company founded on June 27, 1953, that ran independently until 1985 when it was acquired by EMI. Their studios were located in Madrid, and were known among fans as Sonido Torrelaguna. EMI owned the Hispavox record label, manufactured for other labels and distributed in Spain foreign labels. The Hispavox name is retained by Warner Music Group after its acquisition of Parlophone Music Spain in 2013.

== History ==
The company was founded by José Manuel Vidal Zapater in 1953, who would be the CEO until he was replaced by his brother Luis Vidal in 1977. The company began to produce records in 1955, mainly for other record companies of the time, such as the Spanish subsidiaries of Telefunken and Belter.

Towards 1956 the record label began to edit and make records from the French companies Vega and Vogue, and also from the classical music label Discophile Français. It was innovative for implanting the "microsurco" system, pioneer in Spain, only used at that time by Hispavox.

The company managed to edit, produce and distribute exclusively and independently for CBS and Warner Brothers (prior to their merger as WEA). Hispavox continued to exploit all these records along with others of minor interest, completing a turnover that led the company to reach an outstanding position among the Spanish record companies. The exclusive exploitation of these two companies in the Spanish market, led to the expansion of its catalog throughout the world: Latin America, the United States, Japan, Russia, etc. It promoted its complete catalog nationally and internationally, both in classical music and folklore, flamenco and Spanish song; in other words, it covered the entire musical spectrum.

Some recordings are worth mentioning because they are exceptional. For example, the works of Antonio de Cabezón, directed and interpreted by Antonio Baciero, who spent several years researching in Burgos monasteries looking for data to record such a great work; those of the master Tomás Luis de Victoria; the Magna Antología del Flamenco; Canta Jerez; the Antología del folclore musical de España; the Cantos Gregorianos recorded in Silos, that after the years would be a huge success all over the world. This helped to create a great cultural heritage for Spain.

On a commercial level, Hispavox scored a great success hiring Sara Montiel in 1958. The actress-singer had an overwhelming popularity all around the world and her first album with them, the soundtrack album of the film The Violet Seller, was an international hit. It topped sales in Spain and in Latin America and, in July 1959, Hispavox served a Golden Disk award to Montiel for the number of records sold. Among other pop artists released by Hispavox those years were Monna Bell, Raphael, Karina and Los Pekenikes.

During the 1960s, the composer Rafael Trabuchelli held the position of artistic director, and promoted the careers of artists such as Miguel Ríos, José Luis Perales, Karina, Raphael and Los Pekenikes. After his appointment as artistic director in 1965 he hired as assistants the composer-arranger Waldo de los Ríos and the sound engineer Mike Lewellyn Jones and the company obtained great successes such as "La Yenca", "Himno a la alegría", by Miguel Ríos; "Palomitas de maíz", by Pekenikes, or "El baúl de los recuerdos", by Karina.

The Zarzuelas of Pablo Sorozábal deserve special recognition for their tradition and their roots in the Spanish people, and for the great voices of Alfredo Kraus, Pilar Lorengar, Renato Cesari, Pedro Lavirgen and so many other great voices of the Spanish lyric of those times.

Since 1958 Alfredo Kraus recorded in Hispavox Katiuska, La tabernera del puerto and Black el payaso.
