= Lafonoteca =

Spanish online music database

- Website type: Online database for music albums, artists and songs; reviews and biographies
- Available in: Spanish
- Creator: Raúl Alonso
- Website: lafonoteca.net
- Commercial: No
- Registration: Optional
- Launched: 2008; 18 years ago
- Current status: Online

Lafonoteca is an online music database and guide service website for Spanish popular music.

== Content ==
As a database, Lafonoteca covers a multitude of styles and genres, from pop, rock and hip-hop to traditional Spanish and world music styles such as flamenco and rumba.

It contains over 1000 biographies of different Spanish bands and artists, including place of origin, time in activity and names of its components. In addition, for each band or artist they have an outlined discography and the most representative, which are rated from one to five stars.

Lafonoteca edit their web content licensed under creative commons.

== Other activities ==
As a parallel activity they have promoted performances by Spanish bands in London to publicize independent Spanish music abroad. They debuted with Triángulo de Amor Bizarro, followed by Pauline en la playa, Joe Crepúsculo and Delorean, among others. Later they began to organize concerts in the Iberian Peninsula. Besides Madrid where the main activity takes place, they have a very active delegation in Barcelona, which since 2011 has organized around a hundred concerts, another one in Porto is currently open.

In 2011 they started recording with the launch of a compilation titled No te apures mamá, es solo música pop, followed by series released annually. In 2013, with Walden Books, editorial work began with the reissue of Música Moderna by Fernando Márquez originally published in 1981. It was then followed by Saudade, the biography of the Galician musician Andrés do Barro and Batería, Guitarra y Twist in 2016, a book about the origins of Madrid rock.

== Discography ==
- VV. AA.: No te apures mamá, es solo música pop (Don't worry mum, it's only pop music) (2011)
- VV. AA.: Espectros (Spectres) (2012); together with Discos Walden and Maravillosos Ruidos)
- VV. AA.: Madrid está helado (Madrid is frozen) (2012)
- VV. AA.: Nuevos bríos (New Energy) (2013)
- El Último Vecino / Futuro: Nuevo anochecer #1 (The Last Neighbor / Future: New Dusk)(2013)
- VV.AA.: Mar y Montaña (Sean and Mountain) (2014: LaFonoteca Barcelona together with Shook Down)
- Puente Aéreo vol.1: Gúdar+Hazte Lapon (2014; together with LaFonoteca Barcelona)
- Puente Aéreo vol.2: Univers+Celica XX (2014; together with LaFonoteca Barcelona)
- Los Suspensos: Maquetas perdidas (2014)
- VV.AA.: El Futuro B.S.O (2015)
- Puente Aéreo vol.3: Wild Honey+Betacam+Fred i Son+Neleonard (2015; together with LaFonoteca Barcelona)
- Puente Aéreo vol.4: Caliza+Màquina Total (2016; together with LaFonoteca Barcelona)
- Puente Aéreo vol.5: Javier Díez Ena + Diego García (2017; together with LaFonoteca Barcelona)
- Julio Bustamante: 'Cambrers' (2018; re-edited 1981; together with LaFonoteca Barcelona, Discos de Kirlian and Discos Walden)
