= Manuel Alejandro =

Spanish composer (born 1933)

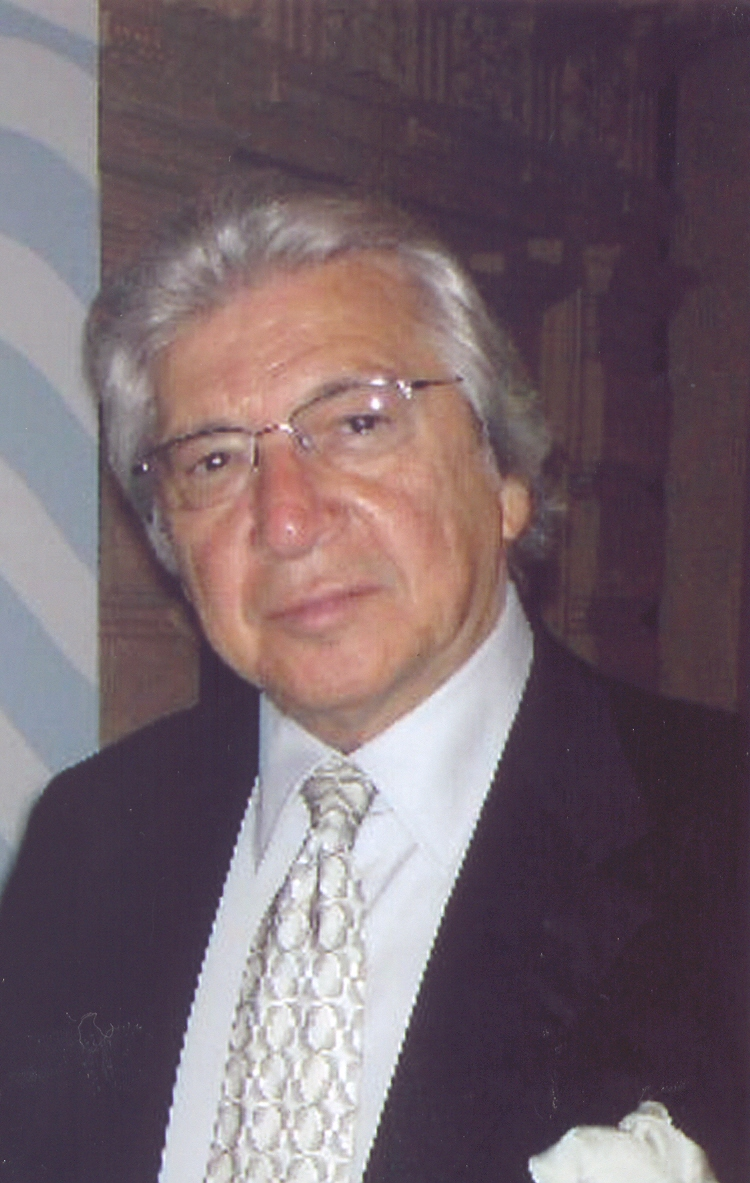

Background information
- Born: Manuel Álvarez-Beigbeder Pérez; 21 February 1932 (age 94); Jerez de la Frontera (Cádiz), Spain
- Occupations: Songwriter, Producer

Manuel Álvarez-Beigbeder Pérez (born 21 February 1932), better known as Manuel Alejandro, is a Spanish composer of Latin love songs, which are better known as ballads. He has written, composed, and arranged songs for the likes of Luis Miguel, Plácido Domingo, Nino Bravo, Julio Iglesias, Raphael, Hernaldo Zúñiga, José José, José Luis Rodríguez, Emmanuel, Enrique Guzmán, Isabel Pantoja, Rocío Jurado, Rudy Marquez, and Jeanette, among many others.

== Biography ==
Manuel Alejandro was born in 1932 in Jerez de la Frontera–Cádiz. He is the son of one of Spain's most renowned contemporary symphonists, Germán Álvarez Beigbeder. It was his father, an accomplished musician, professor, and composer, who inspired Manuel Alejandro to pursue music and become a composer.

== Musical career ==
=== Hits of the 60s ===
He started writing songs for Spanish singer Raphael during the 1960s. Many of those songs are now considered classics. The list includes such hits as:

- "Yo Soy Aquél"
- "Primavera en Otoño"
- "Desde Aquel Día"
- "Cuando Tu No Estas"
- "Cierro Mis Ojos"
- "Hablemos Del Amor"
- "Amor Mio"
- "Digan Lo Que Digan"
- "Estar Enamorado"
- "Como Yo Te Amo"

=== Hits of the 1970s and '80s ===
He continued writing a few songs during the 1970s, but reached his peak in the early 1980s with the release of consecutive albums with songs performed by different international artists. A whole generation grew up listening to songs written by him, although not many knew he was the man behind those hits.

His repertoire of more than 500 songs includes:

- "Chabuca Limeña" by Raphael (tribute to Peruvian singer Chabuca Granda)
- "En Carne Viva", by Raphael
- "Que Sabe Nadie", by Raphael
- "Enamorado De La Vida", by Raphael
- "Provocación", by Raphael
- "Andando de tu Mano", by Enrique Guzmán & Hilda Aguirre
- "Lo Dudo", by José José
- "He Renunciado A Ti", by José José
- "Amar Y Querer", by José José
- "Lagrimas" by José José
- "Procuro Olvidarte", by Hernaldo Zúñiga
- "Insoportablemente Bella", by Emmanuel
- "Ven Con El Alma Desnuda", by Emmanuel
- "Este Amor Es Un Sueño De Locos", by José Luis Rodríguez "El Puma"
- "Dueño De Nada", by José Luis Rodríguez "El Puma"
- "Voy a Perder la Cabeza Por tu Amor", by José Luis Rodríguez "El Puma"
- "Todo Se Derrumbó", by Emmanuel
- "Quiero Dormir Cansado", by Emmanuel
- "Pobre Diablo", by Emmanuel
- "Soy Rebelde", by Jeanette & Iris Chacón
- "Corazón de poeta", by Jeanette
- "Frente a frente", by Jeanette
- "Ese Hombre", by Rocío Jurado
- "Señora", by Rocío Jurado
- "Lo Siento Mi Amor", by Rocío Jurado
- "Ayúdame A Pasar La Noche", by Angélica María
- "Manuela", by Julio Iglesias
- "Un Hombre Solo" by Julio Iglesias
- "Lo Mejor de Tu Vida" by Julio Iglesias

=== Hits of the 00s ===
- "Al Que Me Siga", by Luis Miguel
- "Si Te Perdiera", by Luis Miguel
- "Si Tú Te Atreves", by Luis Miguel
- "Te Desean", by Luis Miguel

== Personal life ==
He has seven children: Javier, Carlos and Patricia with his first wife and Sandra, Beatriz, Marian and Viviana with his second wife.

He is married to Composer Ana Magdalena.
