= Canción melódica =

Musical genre

- Stylistic origins: Bolero; copla; cuplé; chanson; traditional pop
- Cultural origins: Early 20th century, Spain and Hispanic America
- Typical instruments: Vocals; string section; brass section; keyboards; guitar; bass; drums

Other topics
- Latin ballad; nueva canción

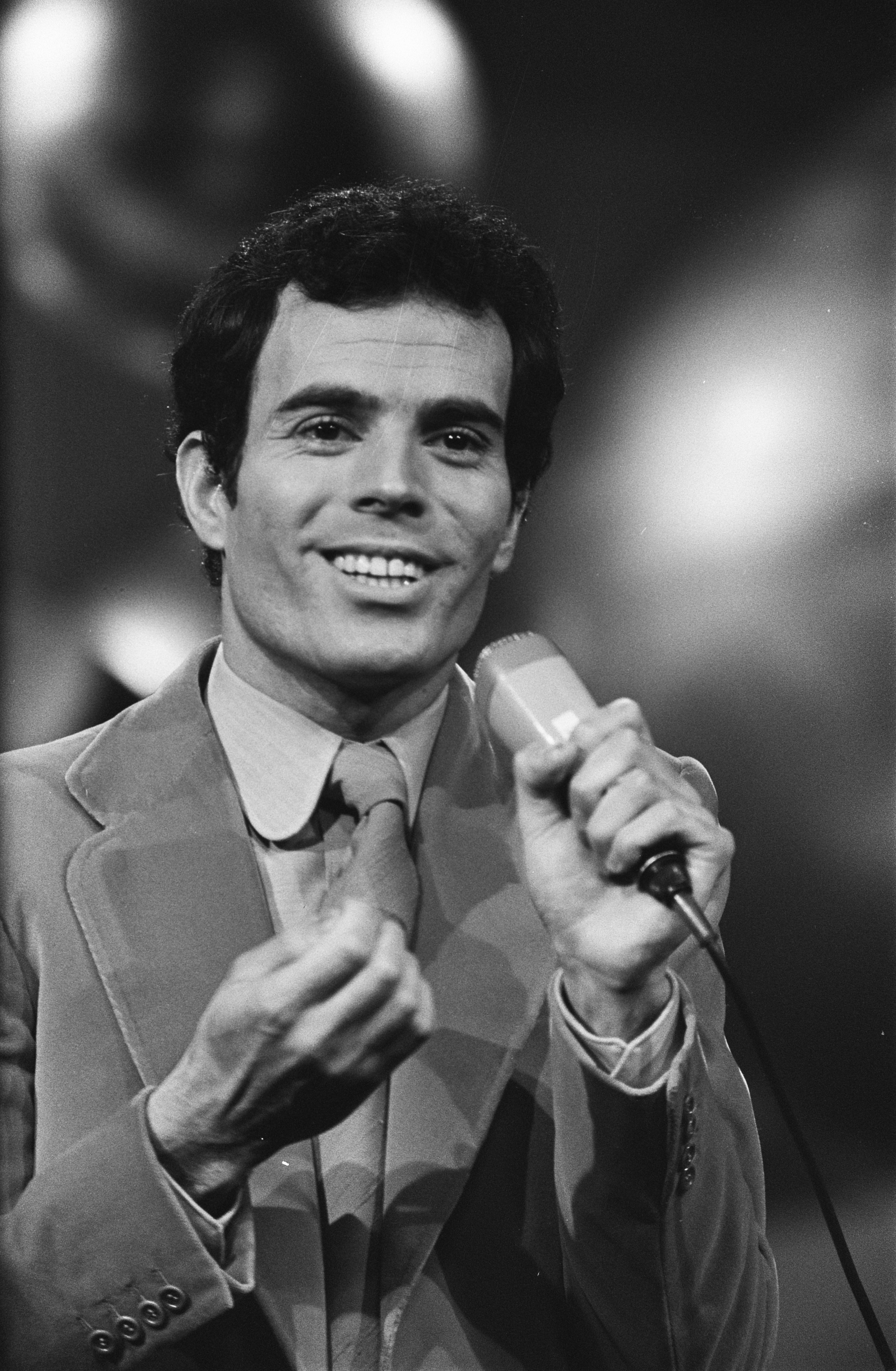
Julio Iglesias at the 1970 Eurovision Song Contest in Amsterdam

Canción melódica (pronounced [kanˈθjom meˈloðika]; Spanish for "melodic song"), also known as canción ligera ("light song") is a genre of Spanish-language popular music typically defined by sentimental ballads with light, orchestral arrangements. It grew out of traditional forms Latin music such as bolero, cuplé and copla, and later incorporated strong influences of French chanson and the Italian pop popularized in the Sanremo Music Festival.

== History ==
Canción melódica appeared in the first half of the 20th century. Unlike the cuplé, its 19th century predecessor that was primarily strophic, canción melódica was defined through the emphasis it placed on the chorus. The orchestras with vocalists had a fundamental protagonism in the dance parties, which evolved from the popular verbena to "more refined circles" such as salons and cafés. The melodic compositions were accompanied by popular vocalists that appeared in magazines, films and live performances; "Musicologists describe [canción melódica] as the explanation for the birth of the singer stars in the 1920s." The use of the microphone gave them a greater role—and through radio broadcasting, an ensemble of composers, lyricists and orchestra directors worked in behalf of the vocalist. The popularization of radio during the 1940s made canción melódica a massive phenomenon. Key figures include Jorge Sepúlveda, Antonio Machín, Mario Visconti, García Guirao, Lorenzo González and Bonet de San Pedro, among others. From 1930 to 1960, Spanish cinema found in the genre its "main supporter." In the 1960s, canción melódica slowly began to lose markets as young people's tastes turned to rock music. Argentine singer Sandro was a popular canción melódica singer during that decade.

The genre lived through a period of splendor in Spain during the 1970s through figures like Camilo Sesto. Canción melódica became frowned upon as "light music" from the 1980s on, with the rise in popularity of other genres such as rock.

== See also ==
- Jovem Guarda
- Nueva ola
- Schlager
- Yé-yé
