= List of number-one hits of 1976 (Mexico) =

This is a list of the songs that reached number one in Mexico in 1976, according to Núcleo Radio Mil as published in the Billboard and Notitas Musicales magazines. Also included are the number-one songs according to the Record World magazine.

== Chart history (Billboard) ==
Issue date	Song	Artist(s)	Label	Ref.
January 17	"Una carta"	Los Terrícolas	Gamma	
January 23	"Esclavo y amo"	Los Pasteles Verdes	GAS	
February 13	"Esclavo y amo"	Los Pasteles Verdes	GAS	
February 27	"Esclavo y amo"	Los Pasteles Verdes	GAS	
April 23	"Dolannes Melodie"	Jean-Claude Borelly	Gamma	
May 14	"Dolannes Melodie"	Jean-Claude Borelly	Gamma	
June 5	"Dolannes Melodie"	Jean-Claude Borelly	Gamma	
July 3	"Nomás contigo"	Mario Quintero	Orfeón	
July 10	"Jamás"	Camilo Sesto	Ariola	
July 23	"Nomás contigo"	Mario Quintero	Orfeón	
July 30	"Nomás contigo"	Mario Quintero	Orfeón	
September 10	"Wanted"	Doogy Degli Armonium	Capitol	
September 18	"Hoy tengo ganas de ti"	Miguel Gallardo	Capitol	
October 16	"Luto en el alma"	Los Terrícolas	Gamma	
December 3	"Una lágrima y un recuerdo"	Grupo Miramar	Acción	
December 10	"Luto en el alma"	Los Terrícolas	Gamma	

== Chart history (Record World) ==
Issue date	Song	Artist(s)	Ref.
January 31	"Las piernas de Malena"	Conjunto África	
March 6	"Como un duende"	Los Baby's	
May 8	"¡Cómo te extraño!"	La Revolución de Emiliano Zapata	
August 14	"A mi guitarra"	Juan Gabriel	
September 18	"A mi guitarra"	Juan Gabriel	
October 2	"Hoy tengo ganas de ti"	Miguel Gallardo	
October 9	"17 años"	Juan Gabriel & María Victoria	
November 13	"América (Llevo en mi pecho los colores)"	Carlos Reinoso	
November 20	"América (Llevo en mi pecho los colores)"	Carlos Reinoso	

== See also ==
- 1976 in music

== Sources ==
- Print editions of the Billboard and Record World magazines.
