= Esclavo y amo =

Song by Javier Solís

from the album El Peor De Los Caminos
- Released: 1962
- Genre: Bolero ranchero [es], Bolero moruno [es]
- Length: 2:57
- Label: CBS
- Songwriter: José Vaca Flores

"Esclavo y amo" (English: "Slave and master") is a song written by Mexican songwriter José Vaca Flores and originally recorded by Ranchera singer Javier Solís for his 1962 album El Peor De Los Caminos and also released as a single in 1962 alongside El loco. The song, which was Vaca Flores' first hit as a songwriter and also became one of Solis' most emblematic songs, would eventually become a standard of the Mexican popular repertoire.

The lyrics are about a man who is deeply infatuated with a woman, who makes him feel both "slave and master of the universe".

== Los Pasteles Verdes version ==
"Esclavo y amo"

Single by Los Pasteles Verdes

from the album Vol. II
- Released: 1975
- Genre: Bolero, Balada grupera
- Length: 3:25
- Label: Discos GAS
- Songwriter: José Vaca Flores

In 1975, Peruvian group Los Pasteles Verdes covered "Esclavo y amo", which was released as a single from their second studio album Vol. II. Their version, which departs from the mariachi instrumentation of the original Javier Solis' version and instead has a more psychedelic style typical of 70s Latin romantic groups, re-popularized the song in Mexico, where it topped the airplay charts in 1976.

=== Chart performance ===
Chart (1976)	Peak position
Mexico	1

== Pepe Aguilar version ==
"Esclavo y amo"

Single by Pepe Aguilar

from the album Lo Grande de los Grandes
- Released: 2000
- Genre: Bolero ranchero [es], Bolero moruno [es]
- Length: 3:17
- Label: Musart Records
- Songwriter: José Vaca Flores

In 2000, Mexican singer Pepe Aguilar covered the song for his album "Lo Grande de los Grandes". His version, which was also released as a single and features a mariachi instrumentation more reminiscent of Javier Solís' original version, was one of the winners of the 2002 BMI Latin Awards.

=== Chart performance ===
Chart (2001)	Peak position	Ref.
Billboard Hot Latin Tracks	14	
Billboard Latin Airplay	14	
Billboard Latin Pop Airplay	13	
Billboard Regional Mexican Airplay	25	

== Other versions ==
The song has also been recorded by artists such as Vicente Fernández, Manoella Torres, Lupillo Rivera, Marco Antonio Muñiz, Leo Dan and Amanda Miguel, among others.

== See also ==
- List of number-one hits of 1976 (Mexico)
