= List of number-one singles of 1976 (Spain) =

This is a list of the Spanish Singles number-ones of 1976.

== Chart history ==
Issue date	Song	Artist
5 January	"Amor, Amor"	Lolita
12 January	"Amor, Amor"	Lolita
19 January	"Amor, Amor"	Lolita
26 January	"Amor, Amor"	Lolita
2 February	"Amor, Amor"	Lolita
9 February	"Amor, Amor"	Lolita
16 February	"Para Que No Me Olvides"	Lorenzo Santamaría
23 February	"Para Que No Me Olvides"	Lorenzo Santamaría
1 March	"Hoy Tengo Ganas de Ti"	Miguel Gallardo
8 March	"Hoy Tengo Ganas de Ti"	Miguel Gallardo
15 March	"Hay Que Lavalo"	La Charanga Del Tío honorio
22 March	"Hay Que Lavalo"	La Charanga Del Tío honorio
29 March	"Para Que No Me Olvides"	Lorenzo Santamaría
5 April	"Fly, Robin, Fly"	Silver Convention
12 April	"Fly, Robin, Fly"	Silver Convention
19 April	"Fly, Robin, Fly"	Silver Convention
26 April	"Fly, Robin, Fly"	Silver Convention
3 May	"Fly, Robin, Fly"	Silver Convention
10 May	"Fly, Robin, Fly"	Silver Convention
17 May	"Fly, Robin, Fly"	Silver Convention
24 May	"Save Your Kisses for Me"	Brotherhood of Man
31 May	"Save Your Kisses for Me"	Brotherhood of Man
7 June	"Save Your Kisses for Me"	Brotherhood of Man
14 June	"Save Your Kisses for Me"	Brotherhood of Man
21 June	"Save Your Kisses for Me"	Brotherhood of Man
28 June	"Échame A Mí La Culpa"	Albert Hammond
5 July	"Échame A Mí La Culpa"	Albert Hammond
12 July	"Échame A Mí La Culpa"	Albert Hammond
19 July	"Échame A Mí La Culpa"	Albert Hammond
26 July	"Échame A Mí La Culpa"	Albert Hammond
2 August	"Échame A Mí La Culpa"	Albert Hammond
9 August	"El Jardín Prohibido"	Sandro Giacobbe
16 August	"El Jardín Prohibido"	Sandro Giacobbe
23 August	"El Jardín Prohibido"	Sandro Giacobbe
30 August	"El Jardín Prohibido"	Sandro Giacobbe
6 September	"El Jardín Prohibido"	Sandro Giacobbe
13 September	"El Jardín Prohibido"	Sandro Giacobbe
20 September	"El Jardín Prohibido"	Sandro Giacobbe
27 September	"El Jardín Prohibido"	Sandro Giacobbe
4 October	"El Jardín Prohibido"	Sandro Giacobbe
11 October	"El Jardín Prohibido"	Sandro Giacobbe
18 October	"El Jardín Prohibido"	Sandro Giacobbe
25 October	"El Jardín Prohibido"	Sandro Giacobbe
1 November	"El Jardín Prohibido"	Sandro Giacobbe
8 November	"El Jardín Prohibido"	Sandro Giacobbe
15 November	"O Tú, O Nada"	Pablo Abraira
22 November	"O Tú, O Nada"	Pablo Abraira
29 November	"Europa (Earth's Cry Heaven's Smile)"	Santana
6 December	"Europa (Earth's Cry Heaven's Smile)"	Santana
13 December	"Libertad Sin Ira"	Jarcha
20 December	"Libertad Sin Ira"	Jarcha
27 December	"Libertad Sin Ira"	Jarcha

== See also ==
- 1976 in music
- List of number-one hits (Spain)
