= Hoy Tengo Ganas de Ti =

1976 single by José Miguel Gallardo

Single by Miguel Gallardo

from the album Miguel Gallardo 2
- B-side: "...Y Si Te Quedas Atrás"
- Released: 1975
- Genre: Latin pop
- Length: 4:00
- Label: EMI
- Songwriter: Miguel Gallardo
- Producer: Alfredo Domenech

Miguel Gallardo singles chronology
"Recordando a Glenn" (1974)	"Hoy Tengo Ganas de Ti" (1975)	"...Y Si Te Quedas Atrás" (1975)

Audio video
- "Hoy Tengo Ganas de Ti" on YouTube

"Hoy Tengo Ganas de Ti" (English: "Today I Have Desire for You") is a song written and performed by Spanish singer-songwriter Miguel Gallardo. It was released in 1975 as the lead single from his second studio album Miguel Gallardo 2. The song is about a man who tells of his yearnings to a woman who has left. Upon its release, the song was well received in Mexico where it became one of the best-performing songs of the year. Since then, the song has been covered by several artists including Azúcar Moreno, Ricardo Montaner, David Bustamante and Alejandro Fernández.

Fernández covered the song on his fifteenth studio album Confidencias (2013) and features American recording artist Christina Aguilera as the guest artist. It was served as the main theme song for the Mexican telenovela La Tempestad. His version peaked at number one on the Mexican Monitor Latino chart and became a top five hit in Spain and on the Billboard Hot Latin Songs chart in the United States. Azúcar Moreno's cover of the song peaked at number five in Spain while Montaner's version reached number one in Venezuela and ranked at number twenty-three on the US Latin Songs chart.

== Background ==
Miguel Gallardo started his music career as a songwriter, composing songs for other artists. He started his own career as a singer in 1972 under the alias Eddy Gallardo. His first songs as Eddy Gallardo were "Billy Bom", "Jenny", "Sentimiento", and "Explosion de Amor" all of which were released as singles. One year later, he changed his stage name to Miguel Gallardo and released several singles including "Quedaté" which was inspired by Pablo Neruda's poem Farewell and peaked at number one on the Spanish singles chart. In 1975, Gallardo recorded his first studio album Autorretrato which was released by EMI Records.

The song, "Hoy Tengo Ganas de Ti", was selected as the lead single from the album. Lyrically, the song speaks about a man who confesses his feelings to a woman who is leaving. It received radio airplay in Mexico and became one of the best-performing songs of 1976 in the country. The song has been adapted into several languages including English, French, Portuguese, Chinese, Bulgarian and Greek. It has been included on several of his greatest albums including 20 Grandes Exitos (1990), Mis Mejores Canciones: 17 Super Exitos (1993), and Mi Vida (2006) which was released shortly after his death.

== Alejandro Fernández and Christina Aguilera version ==
"Hoy Tengo Ganas de Ti"

Single by Alejandro Fernández and Christina Aguilera

from the album Confidencias
- Released: May 8, 2013
- Recorded: 2013
- Studio: Glenwood Place Studios (Burbank, CA)
- Genre: Latin pop
- Length: 4:47
- Label: Universal Music Latino
- Songwriter: Miguel Gallardo
- Producer: Phil Ramone

Alejandro Fernández singles chronology
"Diferente" (2012)	"Hoy Tengo Ganas de Ti" (2013)	"Me Olvidé de Vivir" (2013)

Christina Aguilera singles chronology
"Feel This Moment" (2013)	"Hoy Tengo Ganas de Ti" (2013)	"Say Something" (2013)

Music video
- "Hoy Tengo Ganas de Ti" on YouTube

"Hoy Tengo Ganas de Ti" was covered by Mexican recording artist, Alejandro Fernández and American recording artist Christina Aguilera for his fifteenth studio album Confidencias (2013). It was released on May 8, 2013, by Universal Music Latino as the lead single from the record. Production of their rendition was handled by Phil Ramone. The track is also featured as the opening theme for the Mexican telenovela La Tempestad. Another version of the song features Fernández as the solo singer which was included on the deluxe edition of the album.

Upon its release, "Hoy Tengo Ganas de Ti" received general acclaim from music critics, who placed particular praise on Aguilera's vocal delivery. The track respectively reached numbers one and four in Mexico and Spain. Its accompanying music video, directed by the Simon Brand, was released on July 19, 2013, and was also met with generally favorable reviews.

=== Background and development ===
"Hoy Tengo Ganas de Ti"
A 27 second sample of the cover of "Hoy Tengo Ganas de Ti" by Alejandro Fernández and Christina Aguilera performing the chorus together. This version was the last production done by Phil Ramone shortly before his death.

Fernández first announced his collaboration with Aguilera in May 2013, during which time he was "putting the finishing touches" on his then-upcoming studio album Confidencias. Their rendition was produced by Phil Ramone. When discussing the project, Fernández commented that "Christina has an amazing voice, sweet but also very powerful and full of healing", and was "very happy and proud with the result". Their cover version is used as the theme song for the Mexican telenovela La Tempestad.

=== Critical reception ===
Upon its release, "Hoy Tengo Ganas de Ti" received generally favorable reviews from music critics. Tom Jurek of AllMusic called it a "smash", and listed it as one of three stand-out tracks from Confidencias. A writer for MuuMuse described the cover as a "duet for the ages" and complimented their vocal performance for being "legendary". Another contributor to the website opined that Aguilera's performance "subsequently rendered all other Spanish language music irrelevant upon its release." Perez Hilton praised the song for emphasizing the "power, feeling and all the right touches in all the right places," and Rolling Stone's Lucas Villa labelled it as "breathtaking". At the 2014 Billboard Latin Music Awards "Hoy Tengo Ganas de Ti" was nominated Hot Latin Song of the Year, Vocal Event, but lost to "Loco" by Enrique Iglesias and Romeo Santos.

=== Commercial performance ===
"Hoy Tengo Ganas de Ti" reached number one on Mexican Singles Chart, organized by Monitor Latino. The track was later certified platinum for reaching sales of 100,000 copies; it accomplished this achievement in seventeen days. It was certified triple platinum for sales of 200,000 copies in December 2013. Also. it proved successful on the Spanish Singles Chart, organized by Productores de Música de España, where it reached number four. In the United States, the track respectively peaked at numbers five and thirteen on the Hot Latin Songs and Latin Pop Songs charts.

=== Music video ===
An accompanying music video for "Hoy Tengo Ganas de Ti" was directed by Simon Brand, and was premiered through Vevo on July 19, 2013. Amaris Castilloof of Latina summarized that Fernández and Aguilera "appear to be in an abandoned mansion and overwhelmed with a tremendous desire for each other." She provided a mixed review for the video, questioning if the "glimpses of skin touching, scenes of someone swimming (we have no idea who) with luxurious pearls, and a cheesy telenovela-esque embrace" were overdone.

Writing for Idolator, Mike Wass gave a positive review for the clip, opining that "[Aguilera's] stunning curves steal the show and she clearly relishes her role as a steamy seductress." Carolyn Menyes from Mstarz commented that it "lives up to the dramatic nature of the song and the telenovela for which it was performed", adding that "the wistful looks seem straight out of Telemundo." Entropy Studio made the music video postproduction between Los Ángeles and Zaragoza. The music video was nominated for Video of the Year at the 2014 Lo Nuestro Awards ceremony but lost to "Propuesta Indecente" by Romeo Santos.

=== Charts ===
==== Weekly charts ====
Chart (2013)	Peak position
Chile (IFPI)	13
Dominican Republic (Monitor Latino)	14
Ecuador (IFPI)	6
Ecuador Región Centro Norte (IFPI)	2
Mexico (Billboard Mexican Airplay)	3
Mexico (Monitor Latino)	1
Mexico Pop Espanol Airplay (Billboard)	1
Spain (PROMUSICAE)	4
Spain Digital Song Sales (Billboard)	2
US Hot Latin Songs (Billboard)	5
US Latin Airplay (Billboard)	25
US Latin Pop Airplay (Billboard)	13
US Latin Streaming Songs (Billboard)	7

==== Year-end charts ====
Chart (2013)	Peak position
Ecuador (IFPI)	29
Mexico (Monitor Latino)	2
U.S. Hot Latin Songs (Billboard)	25
U.S. Latin Pop Songs (Billboard)	31

=== Certifications ===
Region	Certification	Certified units/sales
Mexico (AMPROFON)	Diamond+Gold	330,000^{*}
^{*} Sales figures based on certification alone.

=== Release history ===
Country	Date	Format	Label	Ref.
United States	May 8, 2013	CD single; digital download	Universal Music Latino	
Mexico	May 10, 2013	CD single; digital download	Universal Music Latino	
Spain	May 13, 2013	CD single; digital download	Universal Music Latino	

== Other cover versions ==
In 1996, Spanish music duo Azúcar Moreno covered "Hoy Tengo Ganas de Ti" on their sixth studio album Esclava De Tu Piel. It was released as the second single from the album and a music video for the song was filmed in New York City, New York. The CD single contains the album version and five remixes of the song. Their version peaked at number five on the Spanish Singles Chart. In 2006 Spanish singer and recording artist David Bustamante covered "Hoy Tengo Ganas de Ti" on his fourth studio album, Pentimento, as a special tribute to Gallardo as he was Bustamante's first record producer. In 2007, Argentine-Venezuelan recording artist Ricardo Montaner covered the song on his fifteenth studio album Las Mejores Canciones del Mundo, a collection of famous songs covered by him. Released as the lead single from the album, the song peaked at number twenty-three on the Hot Latin Songs and number ten on the Latin Pop Songs charts in the United States. It also peaked at number one in Venezuela on the Record Report Top 100 chart. On the review of Montaner's greatest hits album Un Camino de Exitos (2008), Eric Schneider called "Hoy Tengo Ganas de Ti" a "dramatic" track. The accompanying music video for Montaner's cover was filmed in New York City, New York which was directed by his wife Marlene Rodríguez Miranda and released in August 2007. A dance remix was included on the deluxe version of the album and it was also recorded in bachata music.

== See also ==
- List of number-one hits of 1976 (Mexico)
- List of number-one singles of 1976 (Spain)
- List of number-one songs of 2013 (Mexico)
