= Galy Galiano =

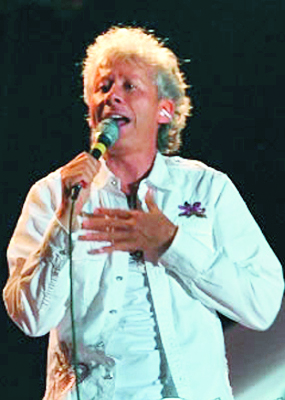

Background information
- Also known as: Galy
- Born: Carmelo Galiano Cotes; 10 February 1958 (age 68)
- Origin: Chiriguaná, Cesar, Colombia

Carmelo Galiano Cotes, better known as Galy Galiano (Chiriguaná, Cesar, Colombia, 10 February 1958), is a Colombian composer and singer of romantic and tropical music. He was the first Colombian artist to appear in Billboard with three songs in a single listing.

== Biography ==
He formed his first musical group Los Diamantes del Cesar with friends in the neighborhood where he played bass and composed songs. Later he met Cuban producer Ricardo Acosta, who gave him his stage name and recorded his first album.

Galy Galiano released in 1981 the album Frío de ausencia, of the ballad genre, with which he occupied the first places of the Billboard magazine for three consecutive months. The title of the album originated from a poem written by his father Orlando Galiano. In Guatemala, Galy Galiano received the "Dama de plata" award for the best selling album of the year.

In 1991 he ventured into salsa with the song "Cómo la quiero, cuánto la extraño.". In 1992 he appeared his work named "Solo Salsa" with which he was successful in the United States, Mexico, Central America, Venezuela, Ecuador and Colombia. In 1994, he won the Ronda Prize for the best-selling album in Venezuela.

In 1994 he returned to the genre of the ballad with the album "Amor de primavera" which got sales that passed the 400 thousand copies.

In 1996 he ventured into ranchera music with the album Me bebí tu recuerdo, which obtained sales of more than 500,000 copies and achieved the first places in the lists of that musical genre. Between 1997 and 1998 he released two more productions of ranchera music: Bebiendo para olvidar y No volveré a casarme, which led him to tour Central and South America.

In 2013, he was in Honduras promoting his album Galy Galiano 30 years.

He currently resides in Chia, Cundinamarca.

== Discography ==
- 1981: Frío De Ausencia - Coldness Of Absence (Note: Distribuido solo en Centro y Norteamérica, contiene las mismas pistas que Galy Galiano e incluye las canciones "Amor no me olvides" y "Volverá" no incluidas en este último.)
- 1981: Galy Galiano (Note: Distribuidos solo en Sudamérica, contiene las mismas pistas que Frío De Ausencia e incluye las canciones "El amor eres tú" y "Que pretendes tú" no incluidas en este último.)
- 1983: Alma Solitaria - Lonely soul (Note: En algunos países el álbum se llamó Labios De Miel.)
- 1985: A Manos Llenas - Hand over fist
- 1986: Brindemos - We offer
- 1988: Celoso - Jealous
- 1990: Dos Corazones - Two Hearts
- 1991: Tu Amor Es Fuego - Your Love Is Fire
- 1992: Solo Salsa - Just Salsa
- 1993: Tres Palabras - Three Words
- 1993: Sin Fronteras - Without Borders
- 1994: Mi Son Latino - My Son Latino
- 1994: Amor De Primavera - Spring Love
- 1996: Me Bebí Tu Recuerdo - I Drink Your Memory
- 1997: Deseos - Wishes
- 1997: Bebiendo Para Olvidar - Drinking To Forget
- 1998: No Volveré A Casarme - : I Will Not Get Married Again
- 2000: Galy Galiano
- 2001: El Sentimental De La Salsa - The Sentimental Of The Salsa
- 2004: La Otra Cara De La Moneda - The Other Side Of The Currency
- 2006: Las clásicas de Galy Galiano - Galy Galiano's classics
- 2006: Un Solo Sentimiento - A Single Feeling
- 2010: Galy
- 2013: 30 Años - 30 Years
- 2016: De Gala - with Gala costume

Singles

- 2014: Mi Obsesión - My obsession
- 2016: Felices los 5 . Happy the 5 people

== Works based on his life ==
- In 2016, the telenovela Todo es prestao, based on the life of Galy Galiano, is broadcast on the Colombian channel RCN.

== See also ==
- List of best-selling Latin music artists
