= List of best-selling Latin music artists =

Latin Music

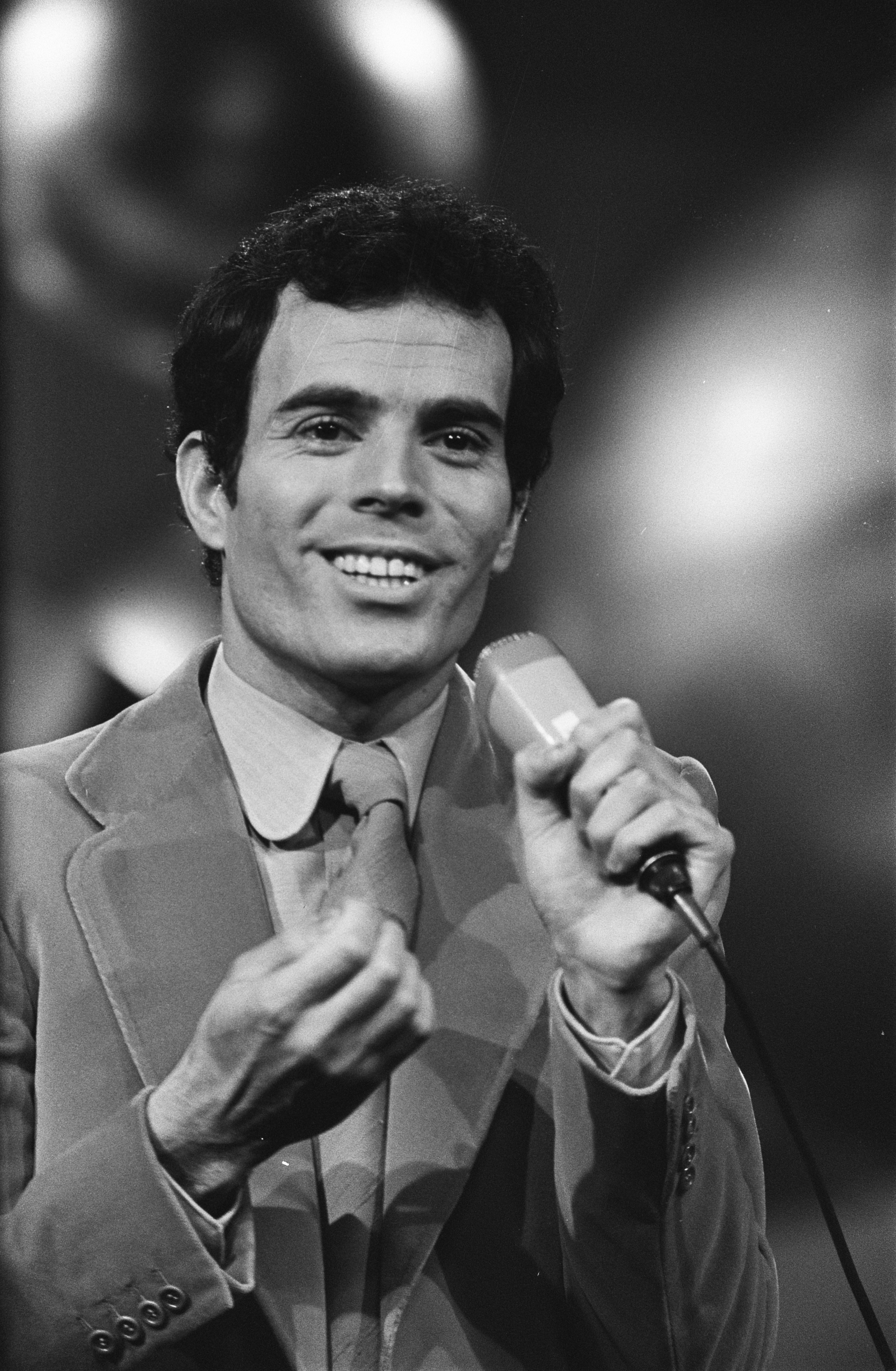
Julio Iglesias was recognized as the best-selling male Latin artist of all time by Guinness World Records in 2013.

Latin music has an ambiguous meaning in the music industry due to differing definitions of the term "Latin". For example, the Latin music market in the United States defines Latin music as any release that is mostly sung in Spanish, regardless of genre or artist nationality, by industry organizations including the Recording Industry Association of America (RIAA) and Billboard. International organizations and trade groups such as the Latin Recording Academy include Portuguese-language music in the Latin category. Billboard categorizes an artist as "Latin" if they perform in Spanish or Portuguese.

Music journalists and musicologists define Latin music as musical styles from Spanish-speaking areas of Latin America and from Spain. Music from Brazil is usually included in the genre and music from Portugal is occasionally included.

Either definition of "Latin music" may be used for inclusion in this list. For an artist to be considered, must have sold at least 10 million copies. This list focuses on performers who are Spanish and/or Portuguese-speaking or who have consistently recorded music in Spanish and/or Portuguese. This information cannot be officially listed because no organization has recorded global Latin music sales. Only Latin recordings, which are defined as a record with 51% of its content in Spanish or Portuguese, (Note: This is the same metric Billboard, the RIAA, and the Latin Recording Academy (until 2024) uses to categorize an album as "Latin".) are counted in the certified units table. Instrumental musicians may also be included if they mainly perform any Latin music genre. For recordings with multiple versions, only Spanish and Portuguese version(s) will be counted towards certified units.

The tables are listed with each artist's reported sales figure(s) and their total independently certified units, and are ranked in descending order by reported sales. If two or more artists have the same reported sales, these are then ranked by certified units. The reported sales figure and the total of certified units for each country in the provided sources include sales of albums, singles, compilation albums, music videos, and downloads of singles and full-length albums. Sales figures, such as those from SoundScan, which are sometimes published by Billboard magazine, have not been included in the certified units column.

== Definitions ==
Gold and platinum certifications issued after 2016, especially on singles, are in some cases more-than-50% streaming generated. Some 20th-century artists can also have significant amount of streaming-based certifications. The certified units of more recently active artists may sometimes be higher in the list than their listed claimed figures because RIAA and almost all other certifying bodies include streaming in the thresholds required for gold and platinum Digital Single Award certification. For this reason, some singles and albums are over-certified by hundreds of thousands of units. The over-certified figures are often in millions of units for RIAA certifications.

The certified units for some artists and bands who have multi-disc albums can be higher than their listed claimed figures because RIAA counts each unit within a set as one unit toward certification. Certified units can also be inflated by the redundancy of certifications because each track's downloads and streams contribute to the certifications of both of the single and the respective album. RIAA counts 10 downloads of individual track as well as 1,500 audio/video streams, including those from singles released prior to the album release, as an equivalent to one unit of album. Theoretically, if one song is streamed 1.5 billion times on YouTube, the single would receive diamond certification and the whole album could be certified platinum, creating a combined total of 11 million certified units without any sales.

All artists included on this list, including charts, have their available claimed figures supported by available from countries with recording certifications. With the exception of certifications from Spain prior to 2003, the certified units are sourced from countries with local music industry associations including those with online databases. Certifications from Spain prior to 2003 are listed in the book Sólo éxitos. Año a año. 1959-2002 (2005) by Fernando Salaverri. In the case of recordings RIAA has simultaneously certified standard and Latin, only the unit with the highest number of certified copies will be counted. For example, Mi Tierra (1993) by Gloria Estefan has been certified standard platinum for one millions units and 16× platinum in the Latin genre for 1,600,000 units, thus only the latter certification is counted. Albums that have been certified in both fields for the same value, such as Sueños Líquidos (1997) by Maná, which was certified platinum and 10× platinum in the Latin field, may use either certification but not both. All certified units are converted from gold, platinum or diamond certification awards based on criteria provided by certifying bodies.

Issued certifications for songs multiple artists have recorded, including featured artists, are added to each artist's total of certified units because all of the artists would have played a significant part in the song. Certifications issued for songs that have been recorded by four or more artists are not included because the artists involved would have played minor roles. (Note: Below you can get an understanding as to when certifications for songs are added to the total certified sales of the listed artists.: One lead artist and one featured artist. (The issued certification(s) should be added to the total of both, the lead artist and the featured artist as both will have almost equal amount of part).; Two lead artists.(The issued certification(s) should be added to the total of both lead artists as both will have almost equal amount of part).; Two lead artists and one featured artist. (The issued certification(s) should be added to the total of both lead artists as well as the featured artist. Both lead artists will play a significant part in a song and the part of the featured artist also should be significant enough).; One lead artist and two featured artists. (The issued certification(s) should be added to the total of the lead artist and to the total of both featured artists as almost all should have equal amount of part).)

=== Standards ===
- To ensure the highest level of fact-checking and editorial control, this list sources sales figures to news organizations and highly regarded music-industry related organizations such as Billboard.
- The figures of total certified units in the tables below are based on certified units of albums, singles—including digital downloads—and videos.
- The order of markets in the tables is based on retail value each market generates, respectively; the largest market is at the top and smallest is at the bottom.

== Artists by reported sales ==
=== 60 million or more ===
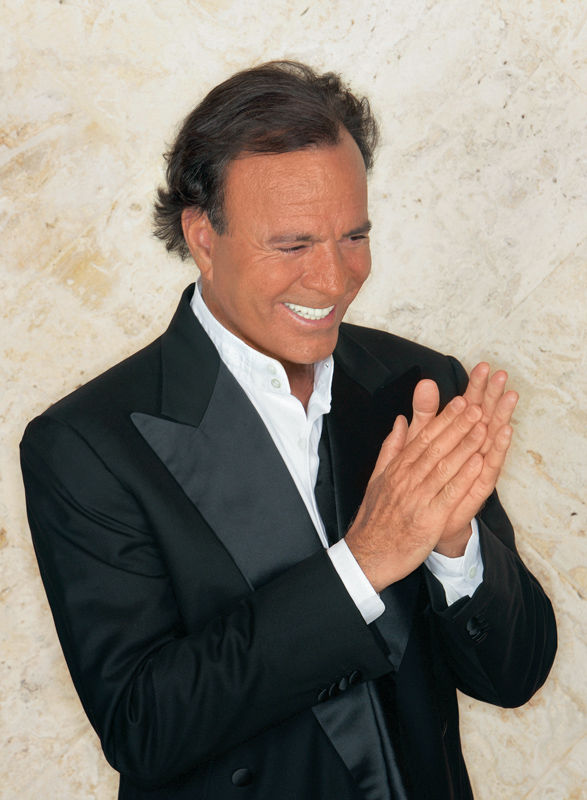
Julio Iglesias

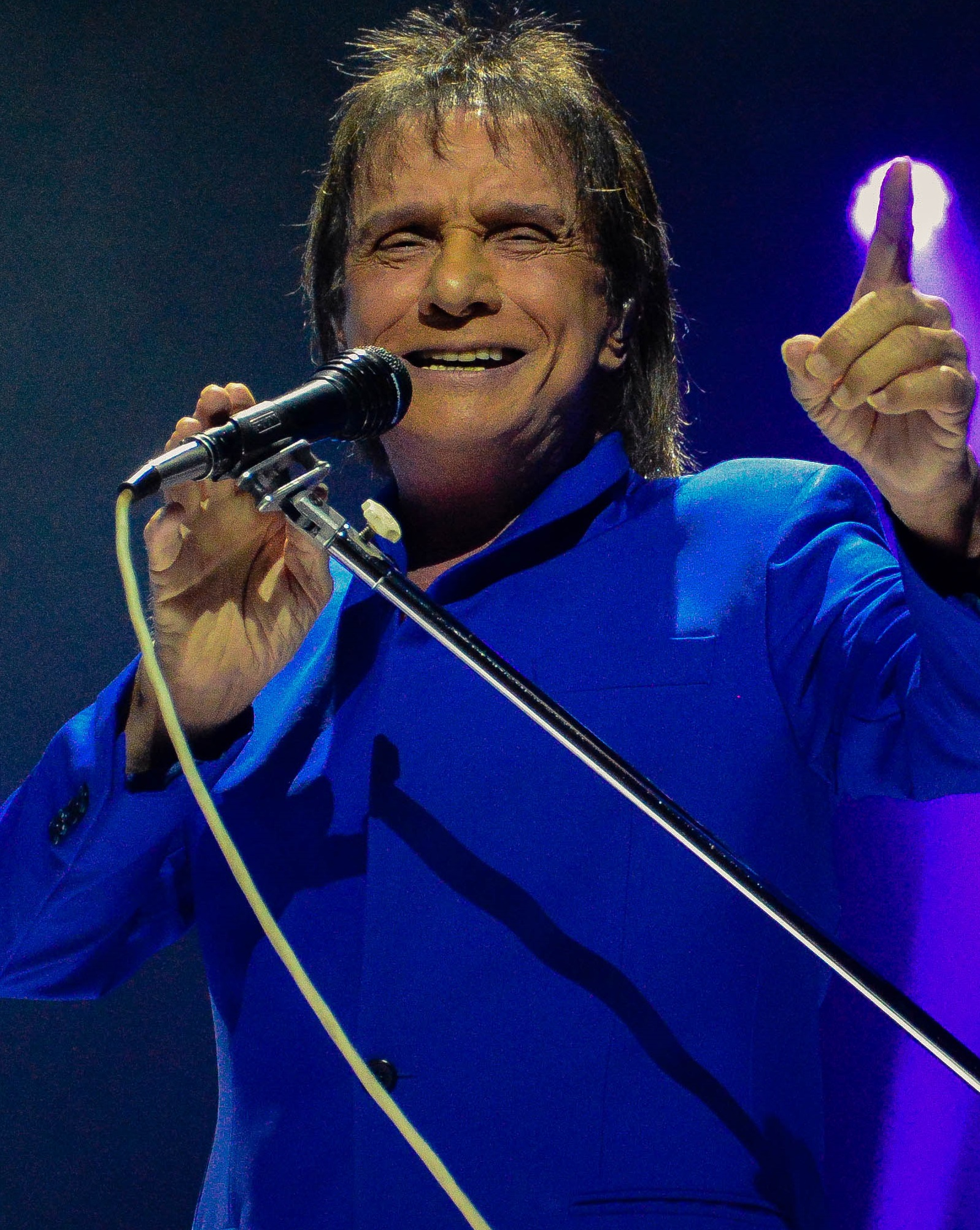
Roberto Carlos

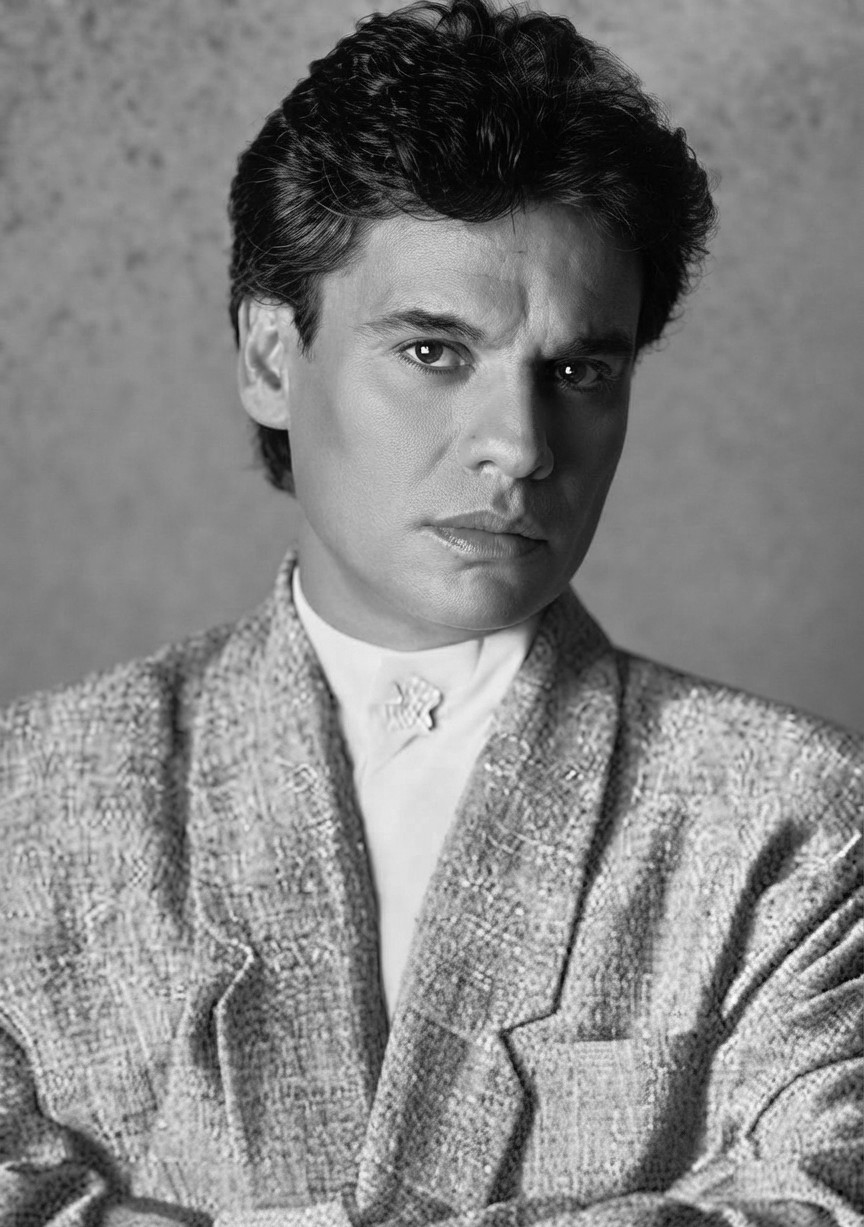
Juan Gabriel

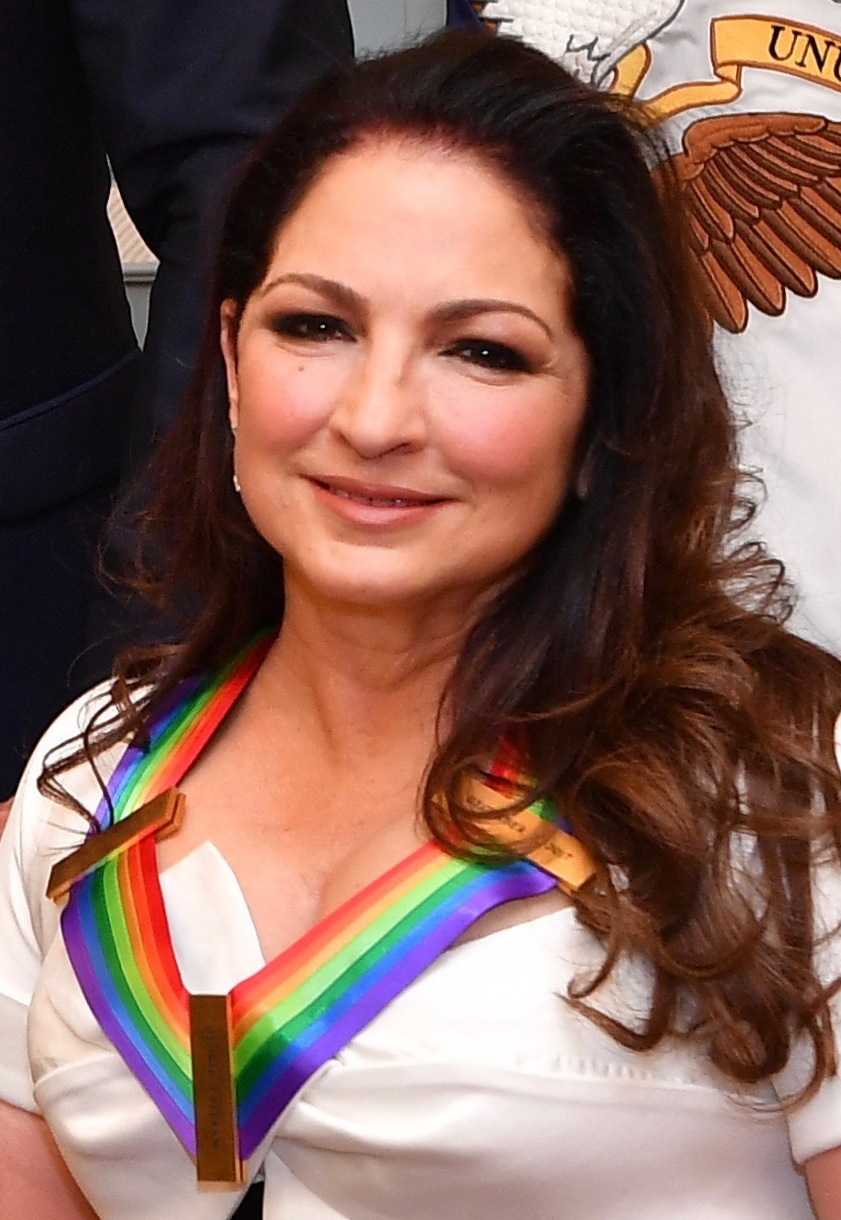
Gloria Estefan

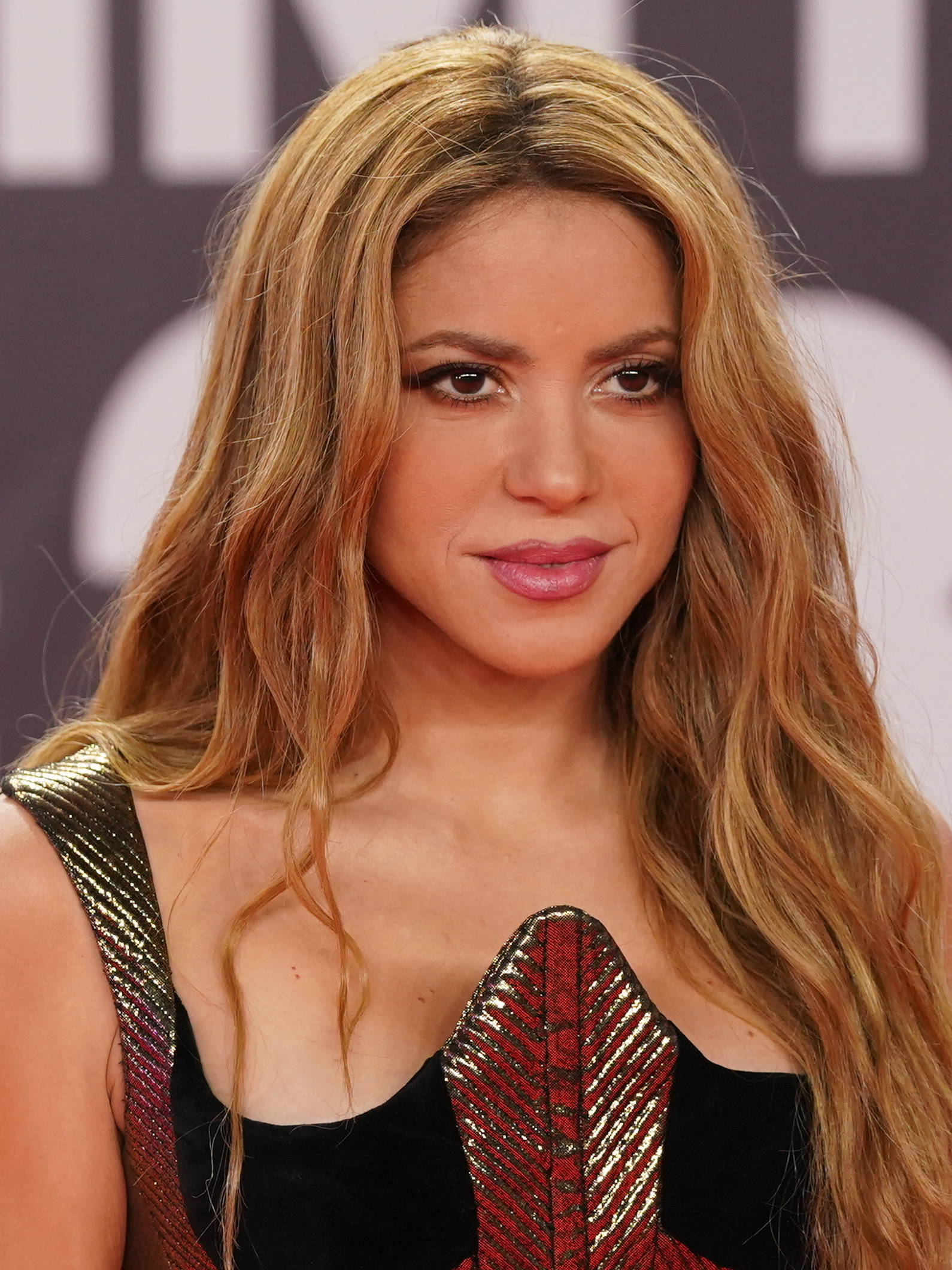
Shakira

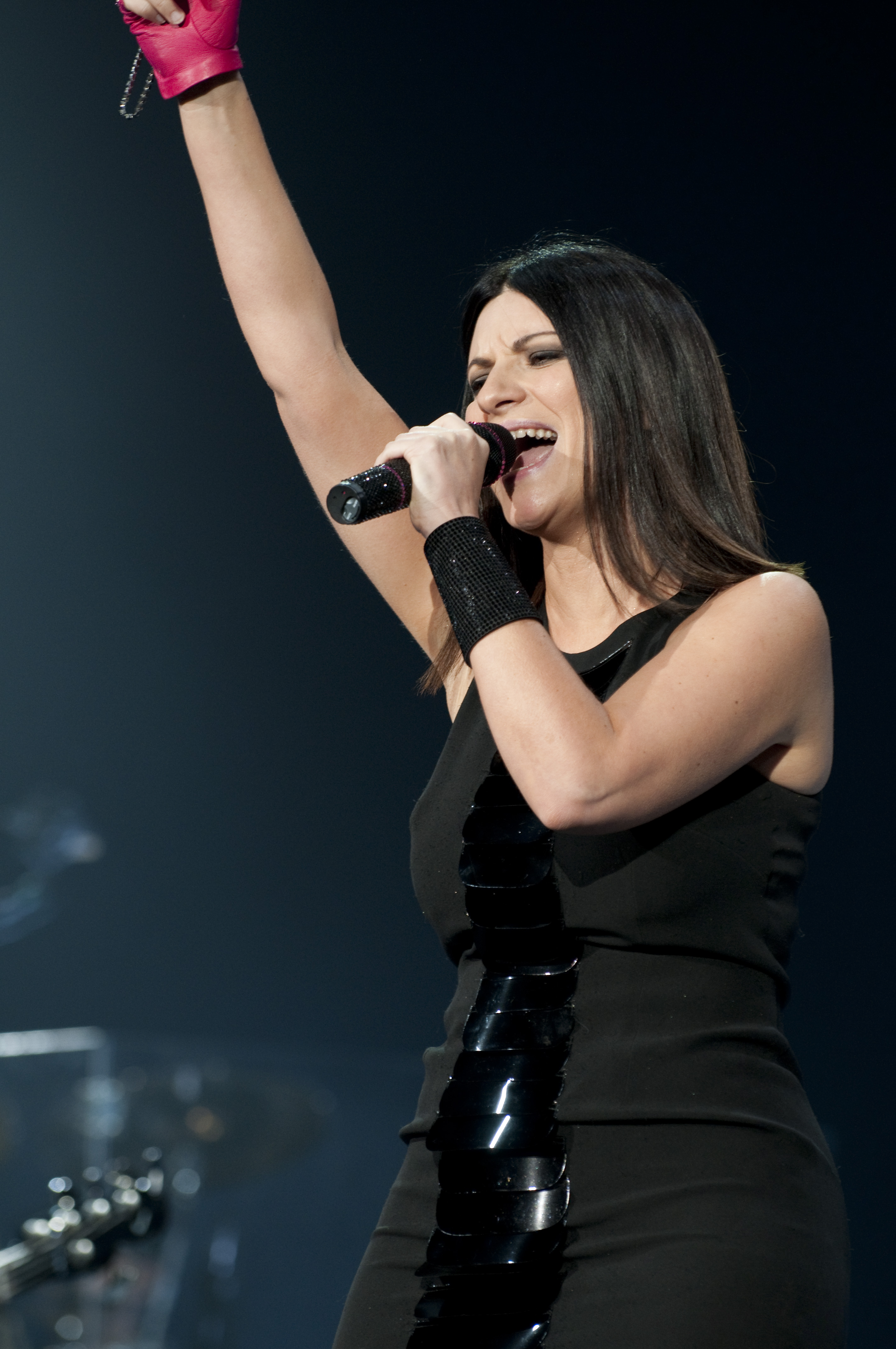
Laura Pausini

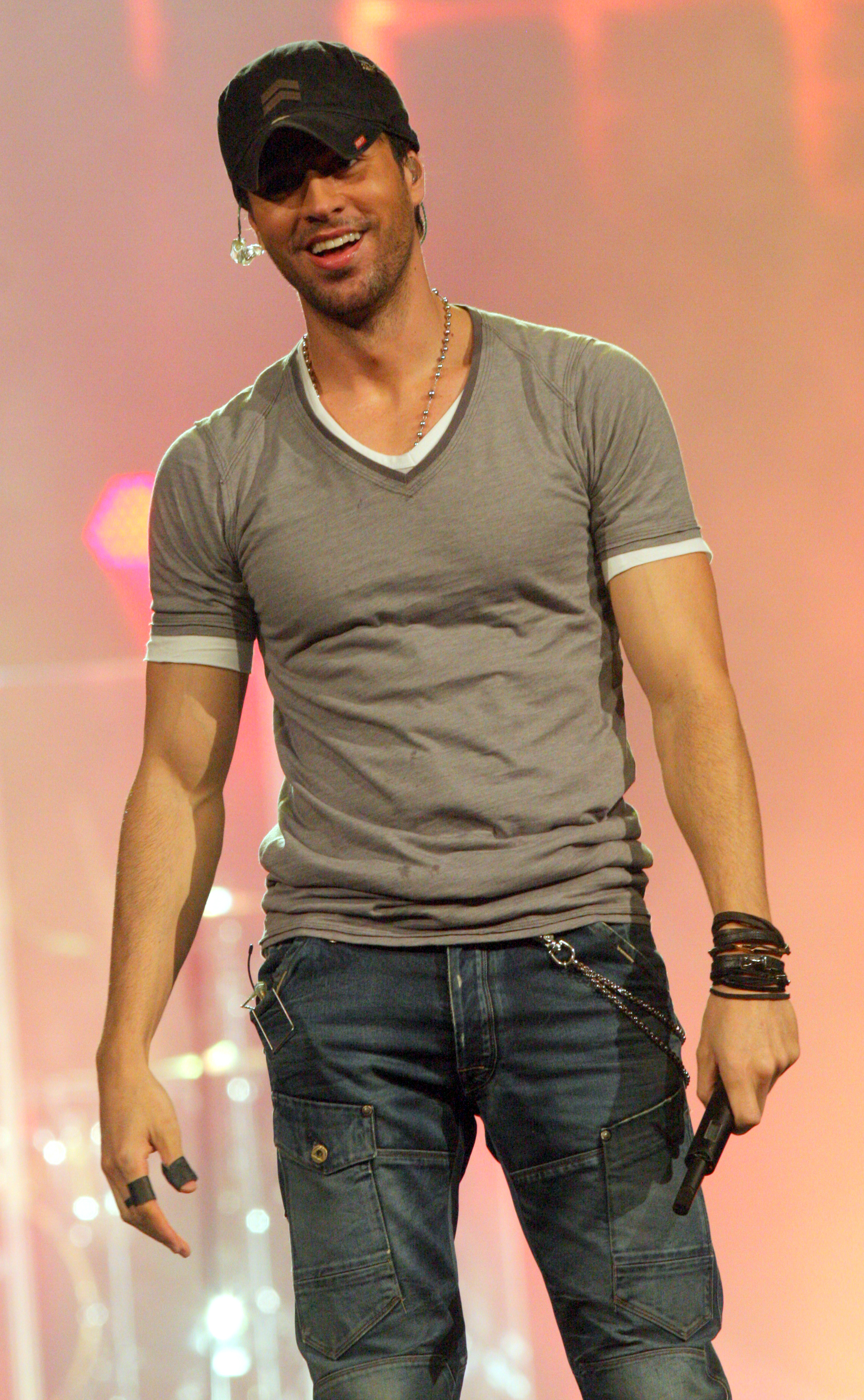
Enrique Iglesias

Artist	Country / Market	Period active	Genre	Primary language(s)	Certified Latin sales (Note: Certification systems have been established periodically throughout the past half century; thus, certification databases are not able to cover all sales. Some (or all) records released and sold prior to a certification system's establishment year may not be found within the available searchable certification databases. Year of establishment (from largest market to smallest based on Retail Value each market generates respectively): United States: 1958; Japan: 1989; Germany: 1975; United Kingdom: 1973; France: 1973; Canada: 1975; Australia: 1997 (online certification-database has begun since 1997. Certifications; however, existed in Australia since the 1970s); Brazil: 1990; Netherlands: 1978; Italy: 2009 (online certification-database covers certifications issued since 2009. Certifications; however, have existed in Italy since the 1980s); Spain: 1979; Sweden: 1987; Norway: 1993; Denmark: 2001 (online certifications for Denmark start from 2001. Certifications; however, existed in Denmark since the early 1990s); Switzerland: 1989; Mexico: 1999; Argentina: 1980; Belgium: 1995; Austria: 1990; Poland: 1995; Finland: 1971; Ireland: 2005; New Zealand: July 1978; Portugal:(online certification-database covers certifications issued since 2004. Certifications; however, have existed in Portugal since the 1980s); Certified sales might sometimes be larger than actual sales, if stores order more albums than they are able to sell, due to certifications generally being determined by shipments and not actual sales. Often, however, actual sales are larger than certified sales, since record labels must pay a fee to obtain certifications. Record companies often apply for certifications only when a record reaches a multiple certification-levels, meaning certifications might not be visible in the databases for more than a short period of time after an album reached a certification level. As global music sales declined in the 2000s mostly due to CD burning and downloading from unauthorized sites, certification bodies opted to reduce their certification levels. See the changes in Certification-award-levels in the following markets: United States (Note, U.S. certification-award-levels for singles before 1989 were: 1,000,000 for Gold and 2,000,000 for Platinum. Also, U.S. certification-awards for Shortform albums before September 1996 were: 250,000 for Gold and 500,000 for Platinum); Japan; Germany (Note, German certification-award-levels for singles before 1988 were: 500,000 for Gold and 1,000,000 for Platinum.); United Kingdom; France; Canada (Canadian certification-award-levels for singles before February 1982 were: 75,000 for Gold and 150,000 for Platinum); Brazil; Netherlands; Italy; Spain; Sweden; Norway; Denmark; Switzerland; Mexico; Argentina; Belgium; Austria: Poland; Finland; New Zealand: (NZ certification-levels for singles before 1989 were: 10,000 for Gold, 20,000 for Platinum)(NZ certification-levels for singles before June 2007 were: 5,000 for Gold, 10,000 for Platinum) (The levels for singles were adjusted again on 17 June 2016 from previous 7,500 for Gold, 15,000 for Platinum, to 15,000 for Gold, 30,000 for Platinum); Portugal:)	Reported sales
Julio Iglesias	Spain	1968–present	Latin	Spanish • English • Portuguese • French • Italian	35.964 million: US: 4.45 million; JPN: 800,000; UK: 580,000; FRA: 1.2 million; CAN: 200,000; AUS: 140,000; BRA: 11.225 million; NLD: 0.9 million; ITA: 150,000; SPA: 8.16 million; SWE: 190,000; MEX: 2.875 million; ARG: 3.190 million; BEL: 100,000--; FIN: 131,636; POR: 248,000; COL: 810,000; CHI: 475,000	150 million
Roberto Carlos	Brazil	1959–present	MPB, rock and roll, soul, bossa nova, rhythm and blues	Portuguese • Spanish • Italian	55.06 million: BRA: 52.9 million; SPA: 700,000; MEX: 670,000; POR: 10,000; ARG: 780,000	120 million
Juan Gabriel	Mexico	1971–2016	Latin ballad, Latin pop, norteño, cumbia	Spanish	6.305 million: US: 2.570 million; SPA: 50,000; MEX: 3.555 million; ARG: 130,000; CHI: 30,000	100 million
Enrique Iglesias	Spain	1995–present	Pop, Latin pop, dance pop, adult contemporary, urban	Spanish • English	42.354 million: US: 22.02 million; GER: 1.2 million; UK: 7.56 million; FRA: 641,666; CAN: 480,000; BRA: 630,000; ITA: 755,000; SPA: 1.75 million; SWE: 665,000; MEX: 9.32 million; ARG: 140,000; BEL: 205,000; NLD: 255,000; SWI: 440,000; DEN: 417,500; POL: 500,000; AUT: 75,000	100 million
Gloria Estefan	Cuba; United States	1980–present	Latin Pop, pop, dance, Pop rock, Salsa, Adult contemporary	Spanish • English	5.84 million: US: 2.7 million; NLD: 150,000; SPA: 1.85 million; SWI: 25,000; MEX: 825,000; ARG: 290,000	100 million
Shakira	Colombia	1988–present	Latin pop / pop / pop rock	Spanish • English	31.88 million: US: 13.68 million; GER: 1.225 million; UK: 200,000; FRA: 1,216,665 million; CAN: 0.160 million; BRA: 2.29 million; ITA: 0.4 million; SPA: 3.35 million; SWE: 60,000; DEN: 64,000; SWI: 205,000; MEX: 5.79 million; ARG: 620,000; BEL: 75,000; AUT: 65,000; POL: 115,000; FIN: 123,950; POR: 75,000	95 million
Laura Pausini	Italy	1993–present	Pop / latin	Italian • Spanish	12.31 million: US: 300,000; FRA: 975,000; BRA: 750,000; NLD: 250,000; ITA: 5.729 million; SPA: 2.29 million; SWI: 500,000; MEX: 960,000; ARG: 288,000; BEL: 150,000; FIN: 72,600; NZ: 105,000	75 million
Nelson Gonçalves	Brazil	1941–1998	Samba, samba-canção	Portuguese	8.8 million: BRA: 8.8 million	75 million
Ricky Martin	Puerto Rico	1991–present	Pop, Latin Pop, Dance	Spanish • English	14.347 million: US: 3.98 million; JPN: 0.1 million; UK: 25,000; FRA: 100,000; CAN: 200,000; AUS: 140,000; ITA: 125,000; SPA: 1.5 million; SWE: 455,000; MEX: 4.915 million; ARG: 1.033 million; BEL: 250,000; FIN: 140,812; NZ: 140,000; DNK: 103,000; SWI: 300,000; POL: 250,000; TUR: 100,000; BRA: 340,000; NOR: 100,000; POR: 50,000	70 million
Luis Miguel	Mexico	1982–present	Pop, Ballads, Bolero, Latin Pop, Mariachi, Dance, Adult Contemporary	Spanish • Italian	35.559 million: US: 6.48 million; MEX: 15.885 million; SPA: 4.79 million; BRA: 425,000; ARG: 5.442 million; CHI: 1.367 million; COL: 400,000; VEN: 770,000	60 million

=== 40 million to 59 million ===
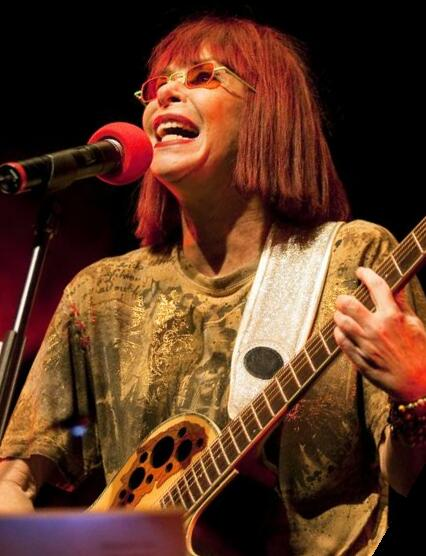
Rita Lee

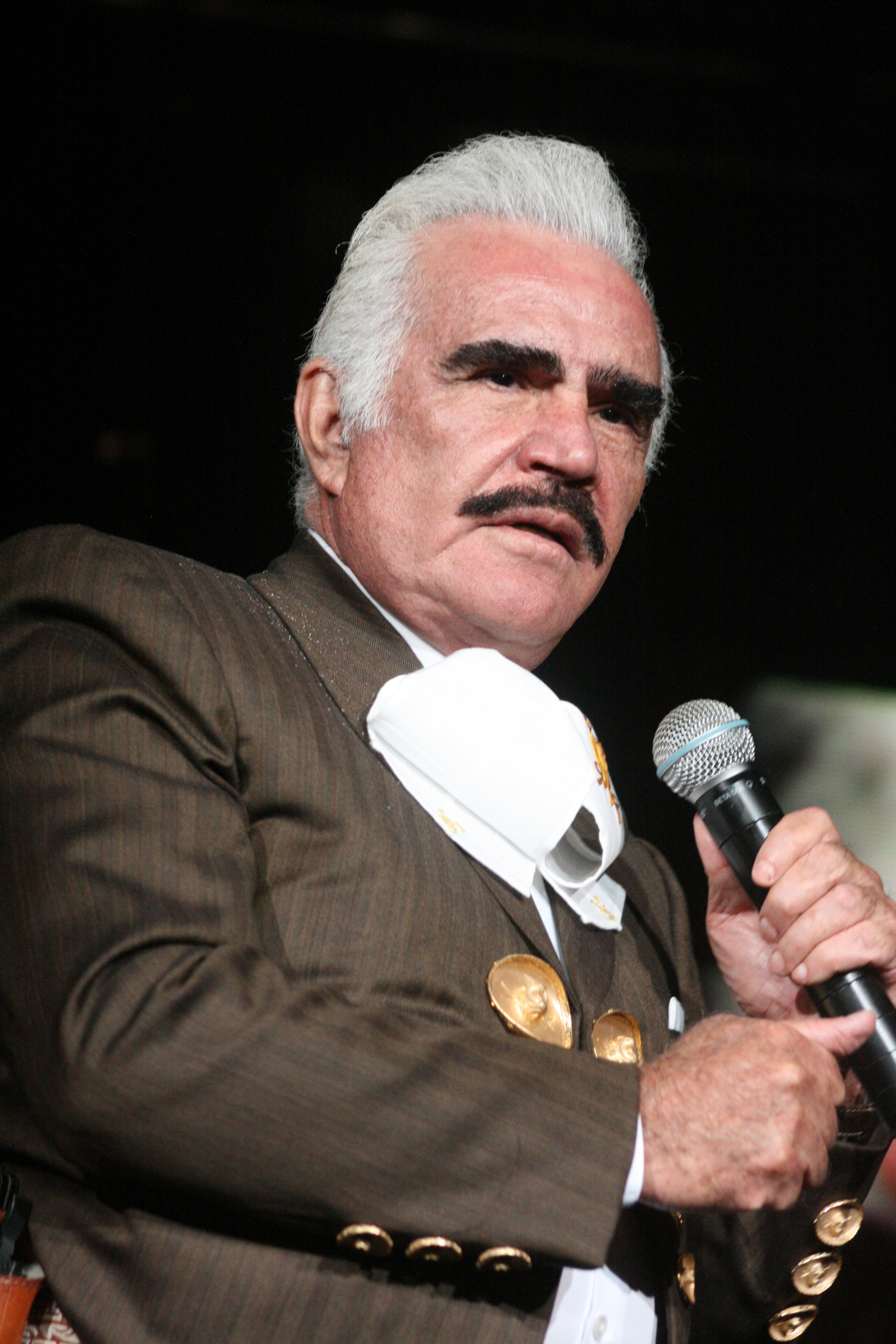
Vicente Fernández

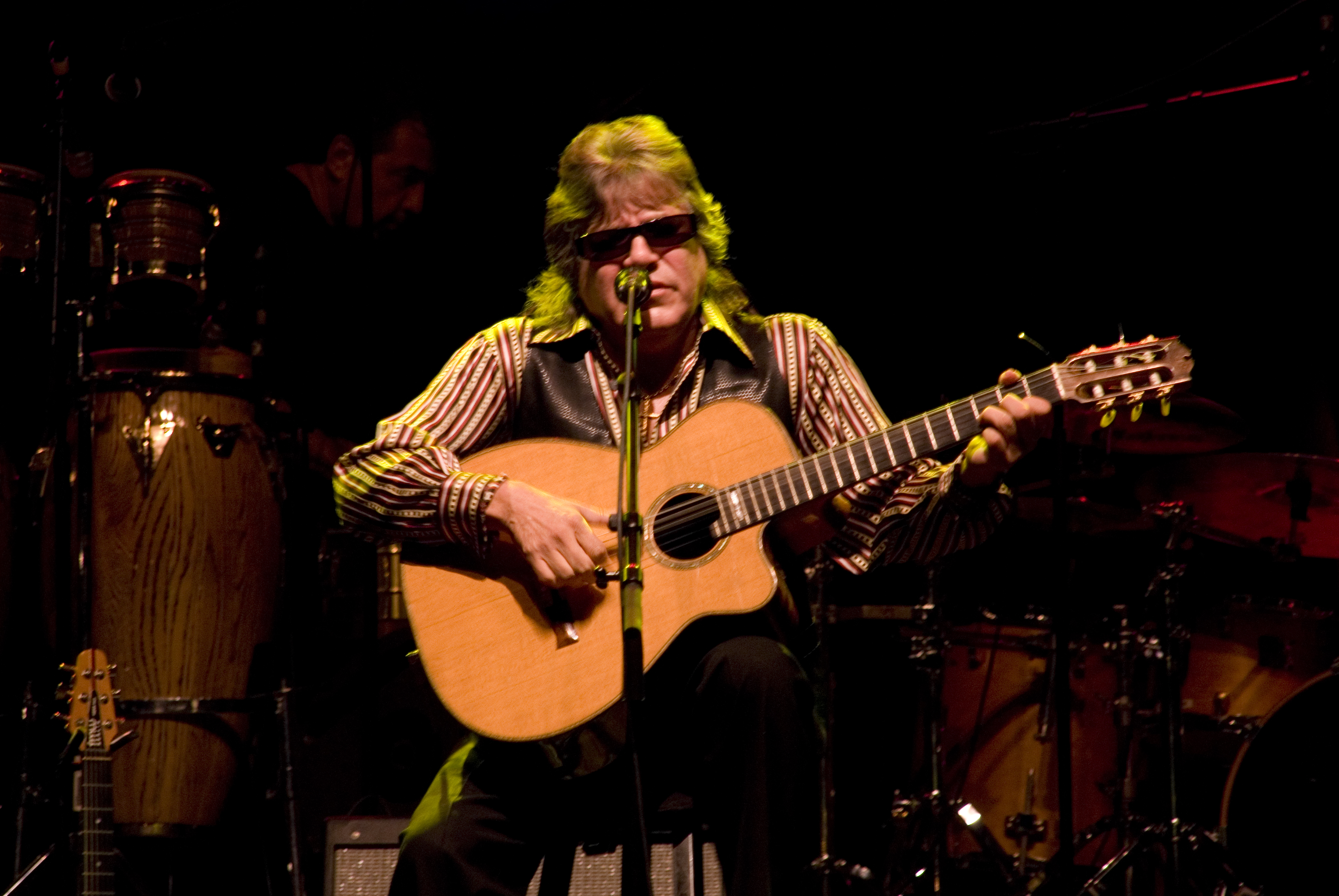
José Feliciano

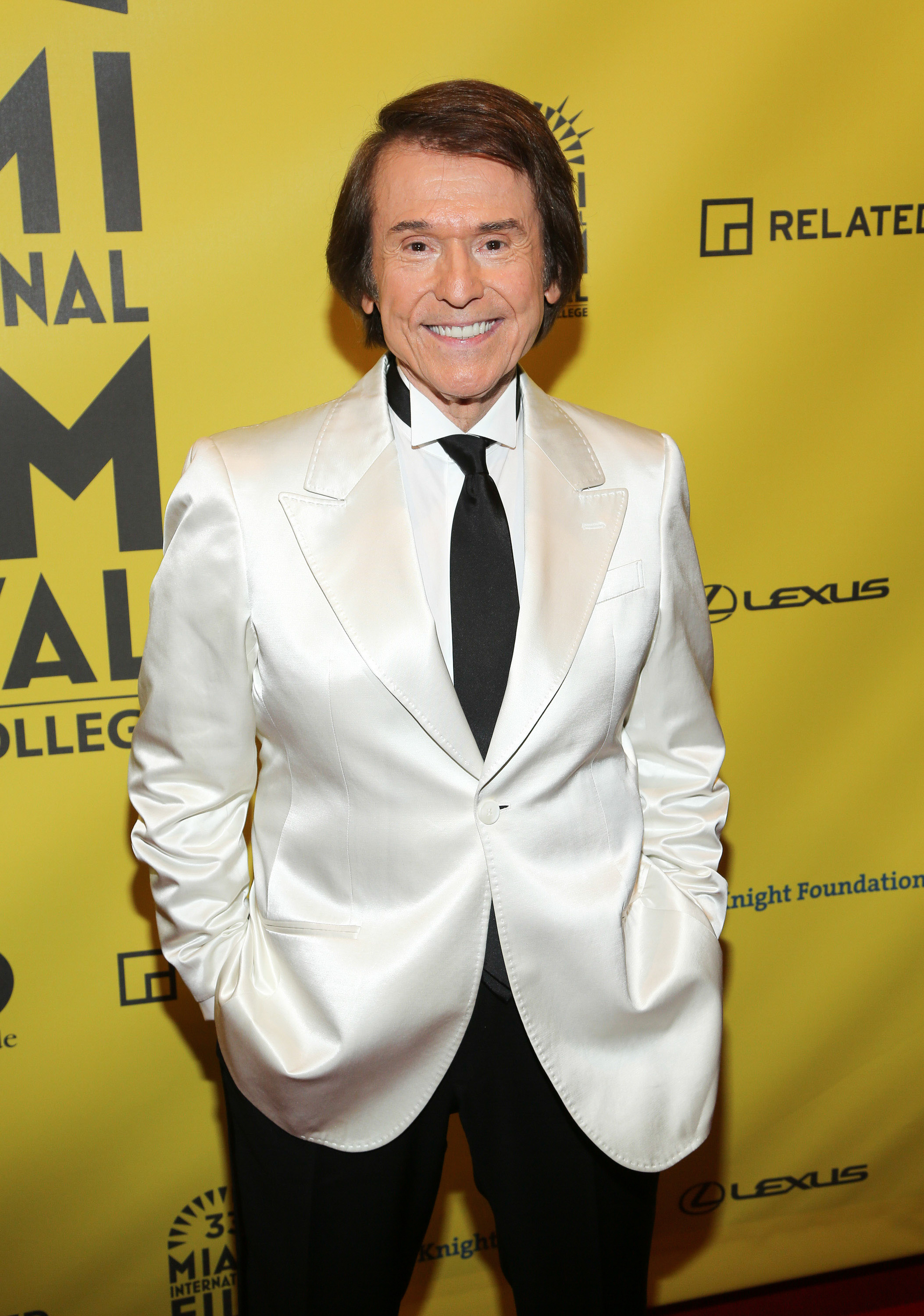
Raphael

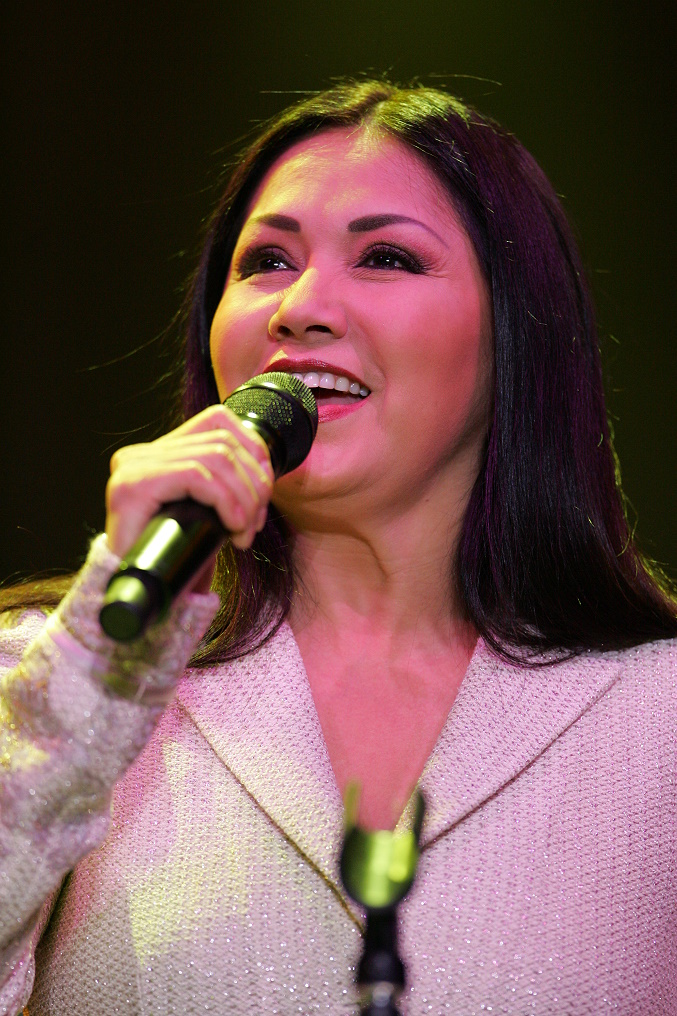
Ana Gabriel

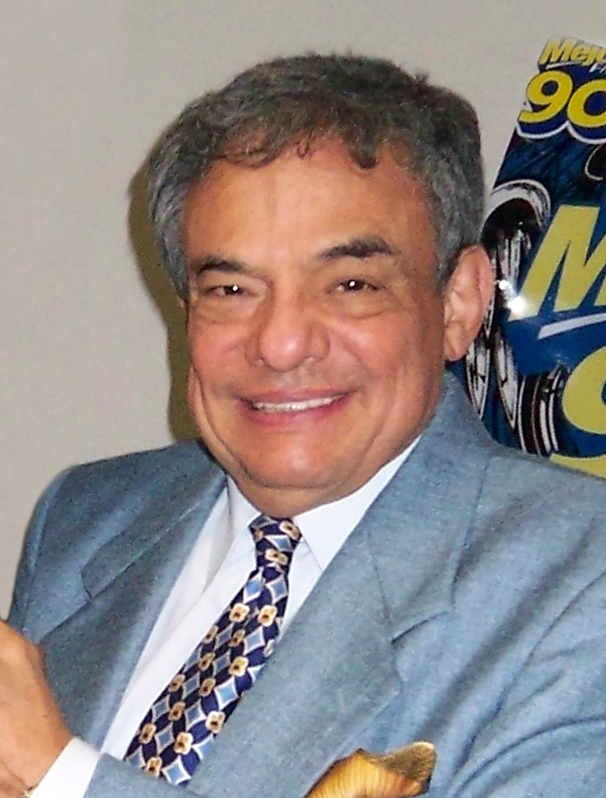
José José

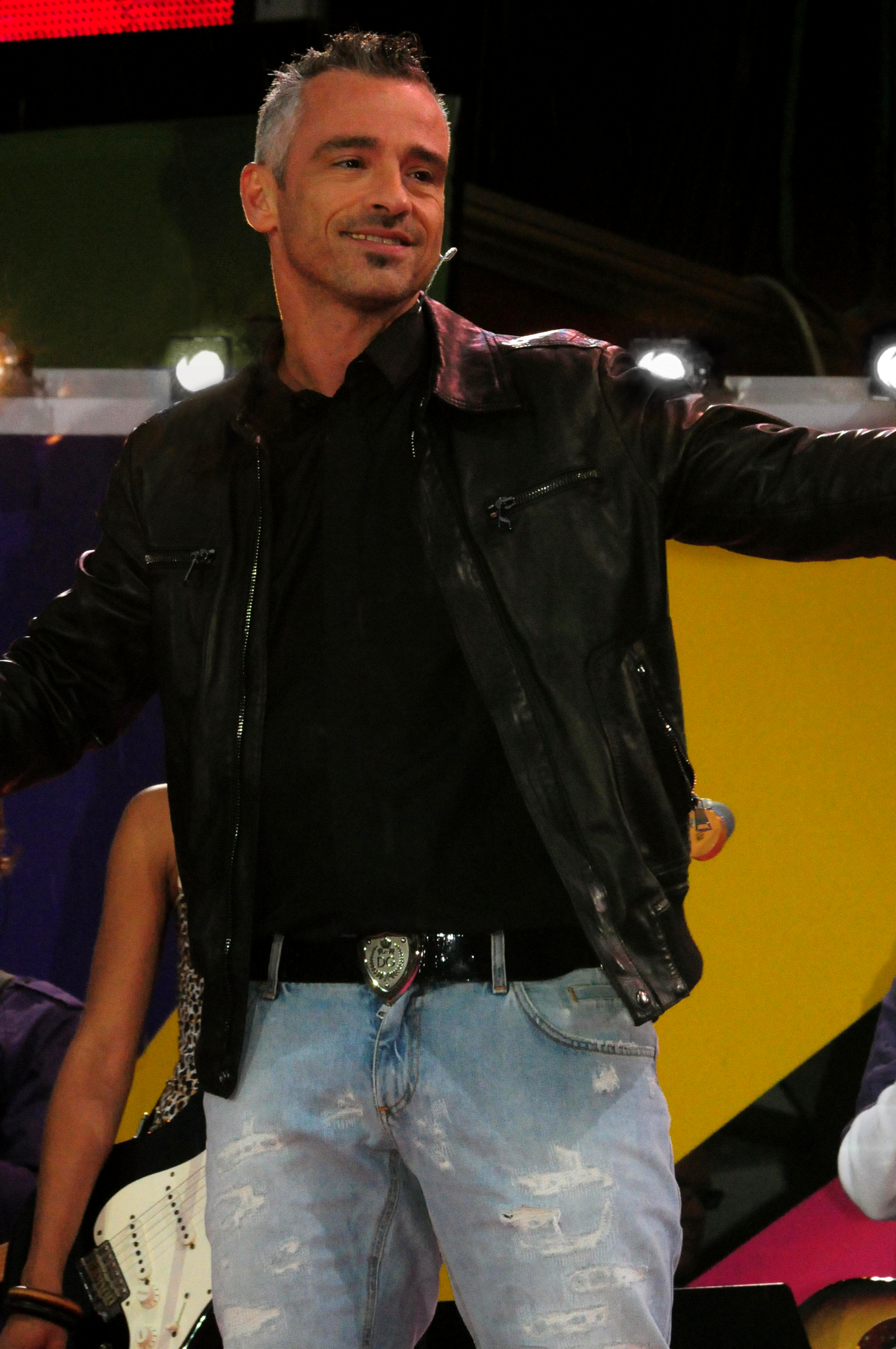
Eros Ramazzotti

Artist	Country / Market	Period active	Genre	Primary language(s)	Certified Latin sales	Reported sales
Rita Lee	Brazil	1968–2023	Brazilian pop, tropicalia, MPB	Portuguese • English • Spanish	2.28 million: BRA: 2.2 million; POR: 40,000; ARG: 40,000	55 million
Vicente Fernández	Mexico	1965–2013	Ranchera, mariachi, norteña, tejano	Spanish	11.79 million: US: 7.1 million; MEX: 4.694 million	50 million 45 million
José Feliciano	Puerto Rico	1964–present	Pop rock, folk rock, soft rock, Latin pop	Spanish • English • Italian	1.775 million: US: 250,000; UK: 600,000; GER: 500,000; AUS: 70,000; ITA: 70,000; SPA: 180,000; DEN: 90,000; NZ: 15,000	50 million
Camilo Sesto	Spain	1964–2019	Ballad, Latin Pop	Spanish	0.92 million: SPA: 700,000; MEX: 100,000; ARG: 120,000	50 million
Raphael	Spain	1966–present	Ballad, Latin pop	Spanish	0.64 million: MEX: 150,000; SPA: 490,000	50 million
Ana Gabriel	Mexico	1974–present	Mexican pop, Mariachi	Spanish	9.13 million: US: 2.5 million; MEX: 6.63 million	40 million
José José	Mexico	1965–2013	Mariachi, Latin pop, bolero	Spanish	7.785 million: US: 100,000; MEX: 7.685 million	40 million
Eros Ramazzotti	Italy	1981–present	Pop, Latin pop, pop rock	Italian • Spanish	2.805 million: US: 700,000; SPA: 1.7 million; MEX: 285,000; ARG: 120,000	40 million
Leo Dan	Argentina	1963–2025	Tango, vallenato, cumbia, ballad	Spanish	0.328 million: MEX: 100,000; ARG: 228,000	40 million
Nelson Ned	Brazil	1961–2013	Latin, Jazz	Portuguese • Spanish	0.10 million: BRA: 100,000	40 million
Yma Súmac	Perú	1941–1997	Soprano, Música andina, Vals peruano, Mambo	Spanish	—N/a	40 million

=== 21 million to 39 million ===
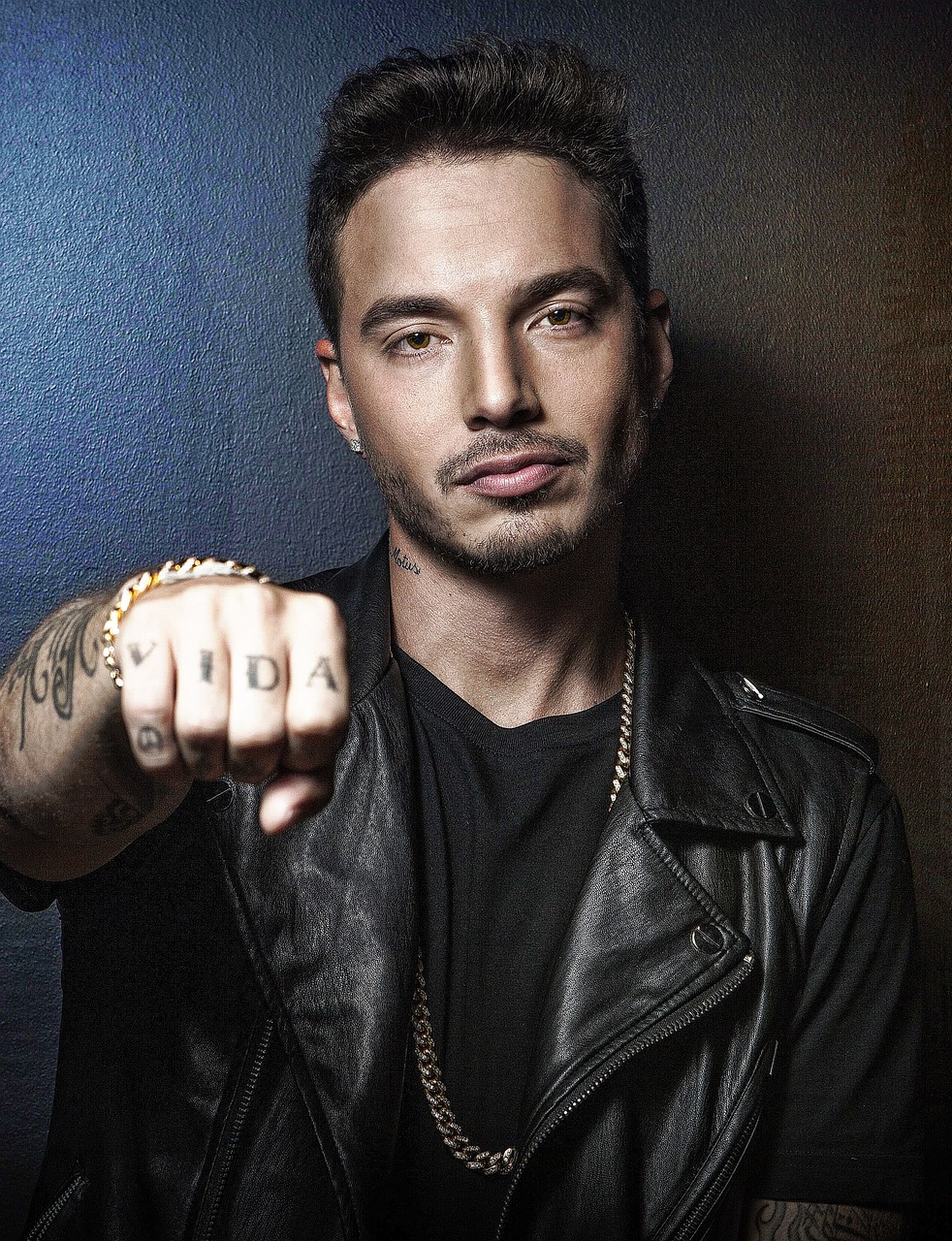
J Balvin

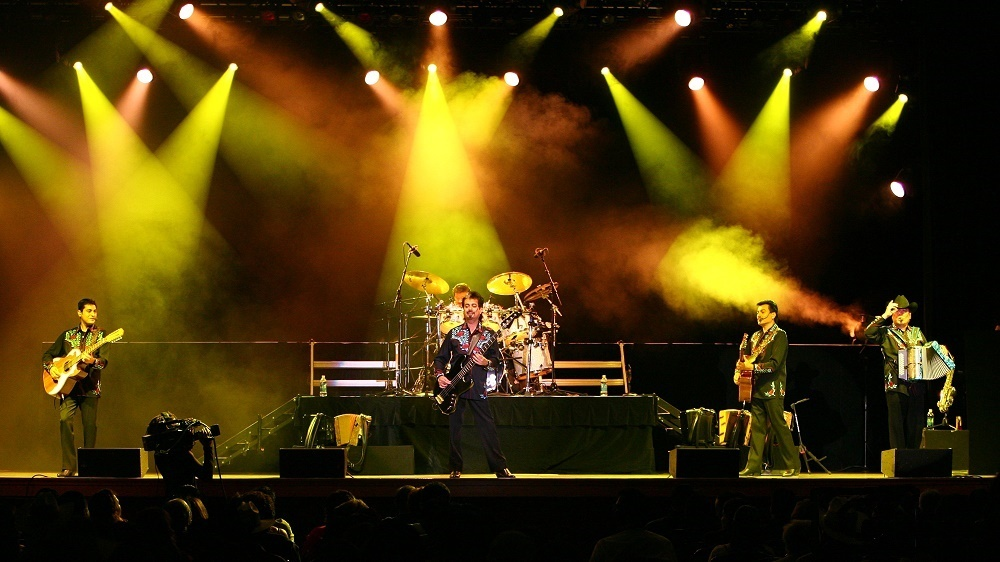
Los Tigres del Norte

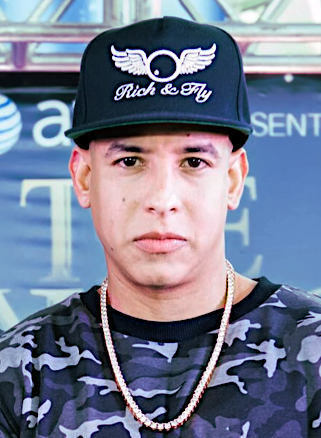
Daddy Yankee

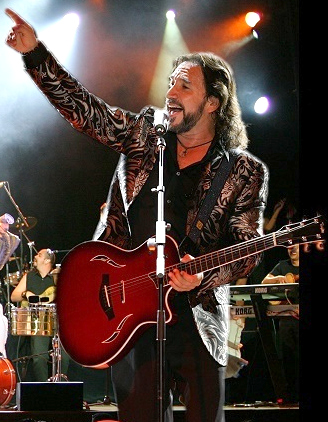
Marco Antonio Solís

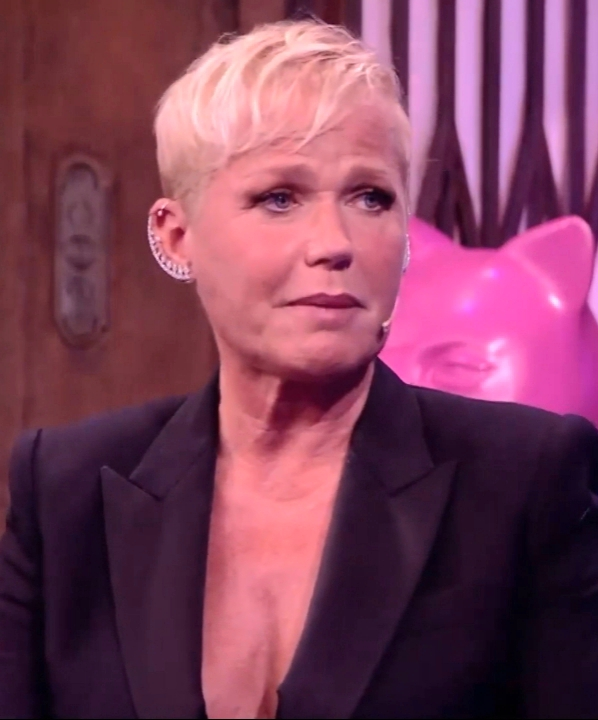
Xuxa

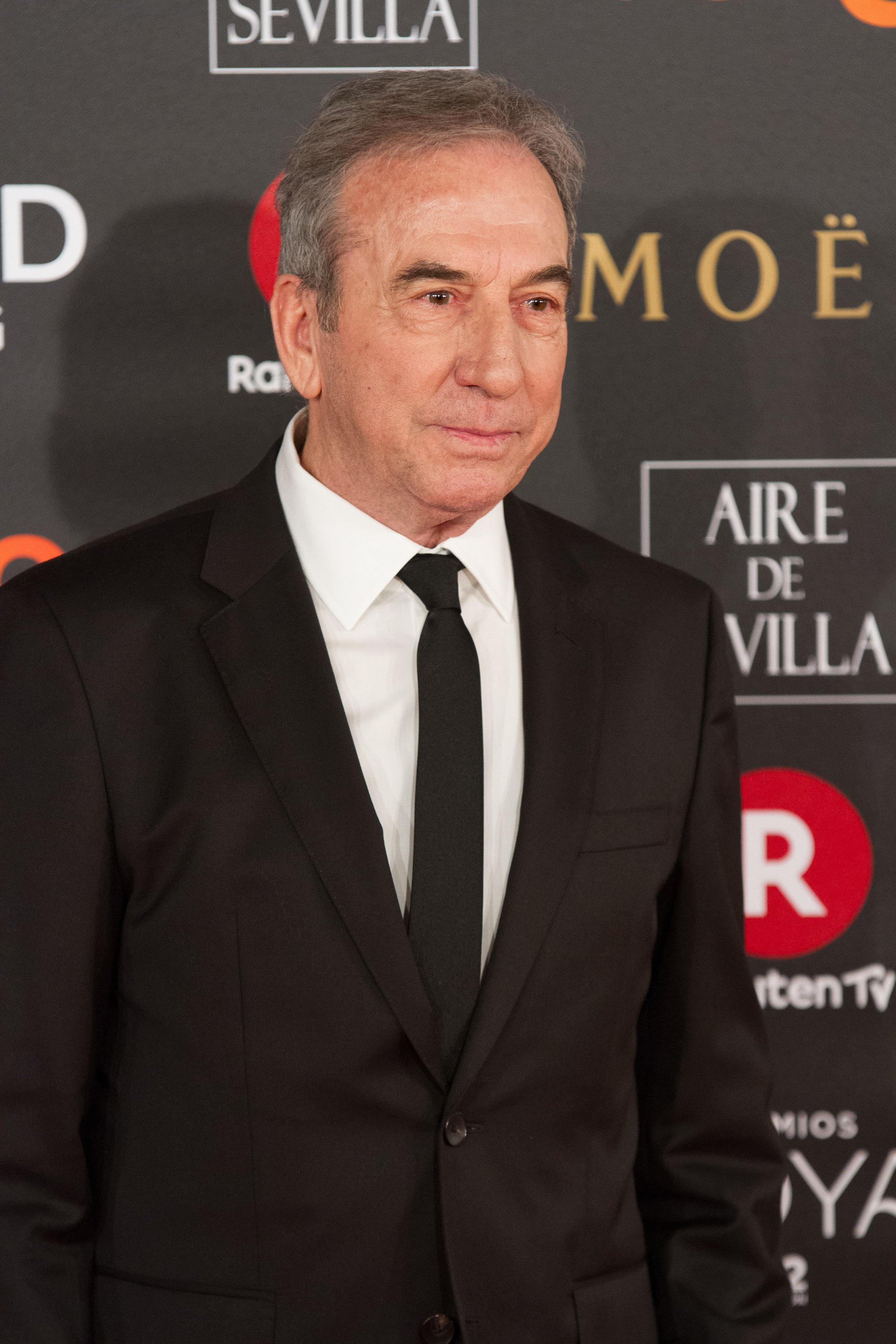
José Luis Perales

Artist	Country / Market	Period active	Genre	Primary language(s)	Certified Latin sales	Reported sales
J Balvin	Colombia	2009–present	Reggaeton, Latin pop, urbano, hip hop	Spanish	37.215 million: US: 23.3 million; MEX: 12.67 million; ITA: 3.475 million; SPA: 2.655 million; UK: 1.6 million; CAN: 1.2 million; NOR: 40,000; DEN: 180,000; GER: 1.4 million; POR: 50,000; SWI: 100,000	35 million
Los Tigres del Norte	Mexico	1972–present	Ranchera, norteña, tejano, corrido	Spanish	8.51 million: US: 7 million; MEX: 1.51 million	32 million
Daddy Yankee	Puerto Rico	1991–present	Reggaeton, Latin pop	Spanish	67.6 million: US: 29.21 million; UK: 4 million; GER: 2.750 million; FRA: 866,666; ITA: 1.16 million; CAN: 1.5 million; BRA: 1.820 million; MEX: 6.93 million; NOR: 720,000; SPA: 17.06 million; SWI: 30,000; ARG: 80,000	30 million 25 million
Marco Antonio Solís	Mexico	1973–present	Norteño, tejano, ballad	Spanish	8.128 million: US: 5.4 million; MEX: 2.22 million; ARG: 508,000	30 million 25 million
Xuxa	Brazil	1980–present	Children's music, dance, Latin pop	Portuguese • Spanish	17.275 million: BRA: 17.025 million; SPA: 250,000	30 million
José Luis Perales	Spain	1973–present	Ballad, Latin pop	Spanish	2.7 million: SPA: 2.1 million; ARG: 600,000	30 million
Rocío Durcal	Spain	1954–2006	Ranchera, Ballad, Bolero, Flamenco, Chera	Spanish	1.70 million: US: 500,000; SPA: 500,000; MEX: 700,000	30 million 25 million
Amália Rodrigues	Portugal	1940–1999	Fado	Portuguese	—N/a	30 million
Maria Bethânia	Brazil	1965–present	Bossa nova, MPB, samba	Portuguese	0.45 million: BRA: 450,000	26 million
Alejandro Sanz	Spain	1989–present	Latin Pop, Latin ballad, flamenco, pop rock, Latin rock	Spanish	14.184 million: US: 1.41 million; BRA: 150,000; SPA: 8.72 million; MEX: 2.8 million; ARG: 1.104 million; ITA: 25,000; SWI: 20,000	25 million
Maná	Mexico	1986–present	Pop rock, Latin pop, rock en español	Spanish	14.482 million: US: 4.71 million; BRA: 105,000; SPA: 1.92 million; MEX: 6.335 million; ARG: 1.142 million; CHI: 200,000; VEN: 70,000	25 million 22 million
Thalía	Mexico	1981–present	Pop, Dance, Latin pop	Spanish	7.846 million: US: 2.45 million; BRA: 280,000; FRA: 250,000; ARG: 200,000; MEX: 3.65 million; SPA: 910,000; UK: 200,000; URU: 6,000	25 million 20 million
Mecano	Spain	1981–1992, 1998	Pop, synthpop, new wave, pop rock	Spanish	4.55 million: FRA: 975,000; SPA: 3.38 million; MEX: 100,000	25 million
Gloria Trevi	Mexico	1989–present	Latin pop, pop rock	Spanish	2.4 million: US: 0.29 million; SPA: 0.02 million; MEX: 2.09 million	25 million 20 million
Rigo Tovar	Mexico	1970–1995	Mexican cumbia, grupera	Spanish	—N/a	25 million
Pedro Infante	Mexico	1939–1957	Mariachi, bolero, rancheras	Spanish	—N/a	25 million
Antonio Aguilar	Mexico	1950–2005	Regional Mexican	Spanish	—N/a	25 million
Romeo Santos	United States	2011–present	Bachata	Spanish	24.25 million: US: 18.36 million; MEX: 5.1 million; SPA: 440,000; BRA: 30,000; ITA: 280,000; CAN: 40,000	24 million
Amado Batista	Brazil	1975–present	Brega	Portuguese	6.605 million: BRA: 6.605 million	22 million
Lucho Gatica	Chile	1946–2013	Bolero	Spanish	0.1 million: SPA: 100,000	22 million

=== 15 million to 20 million ===
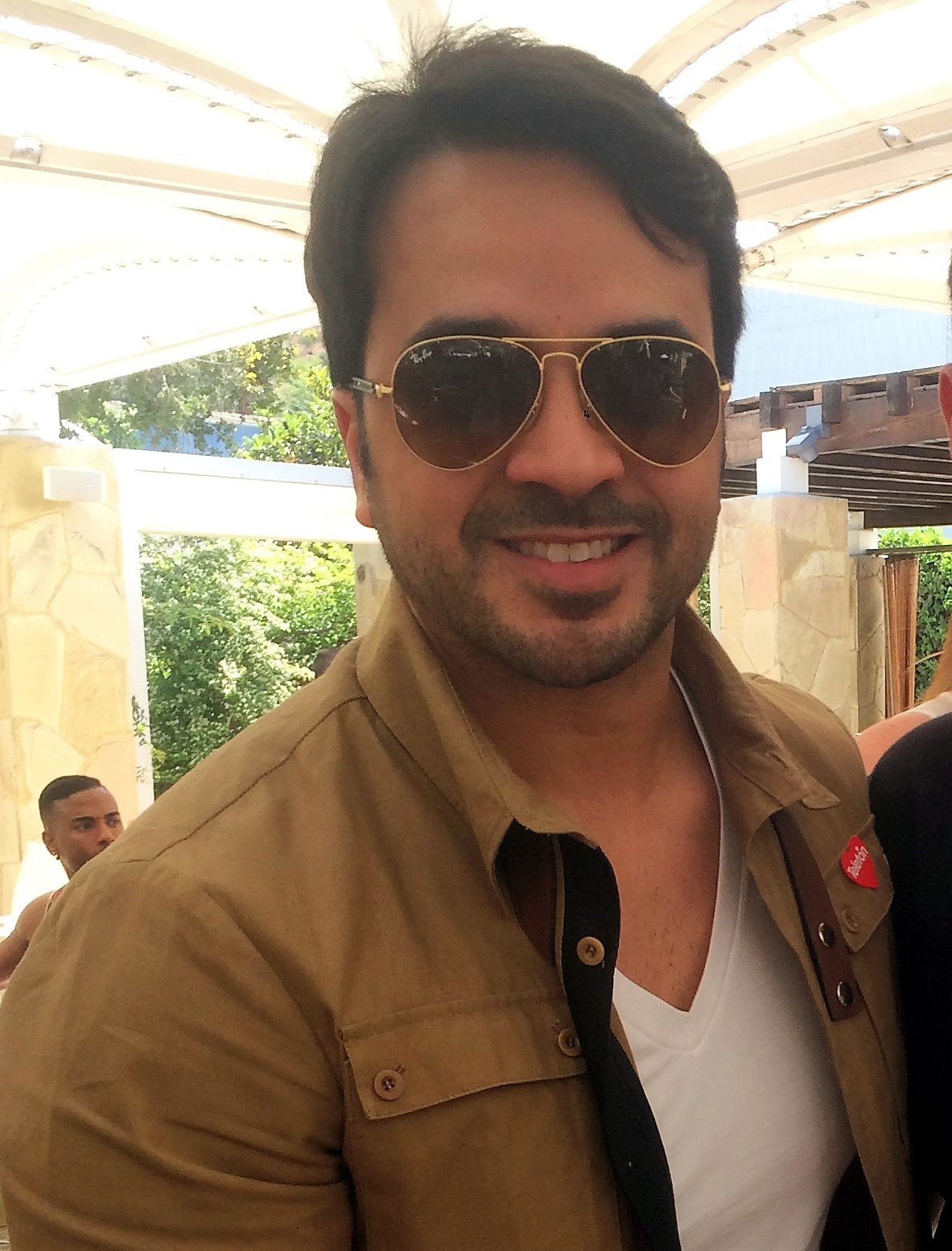
Luis Fonsi

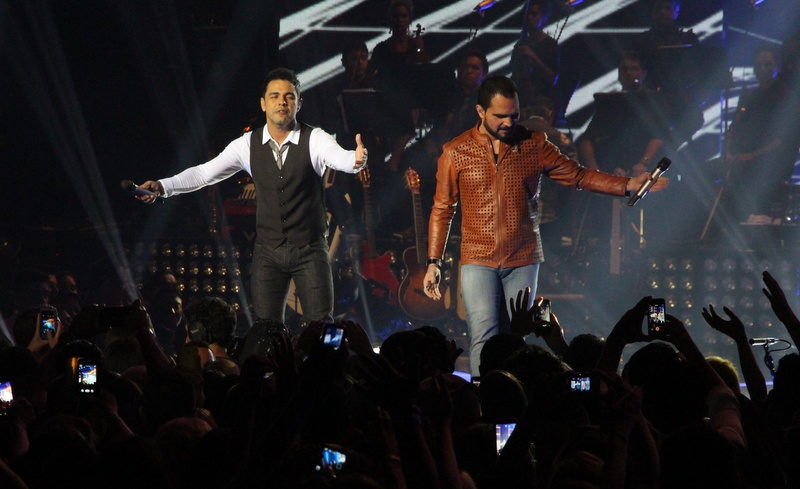
Zezé Di Camargo & Luciano

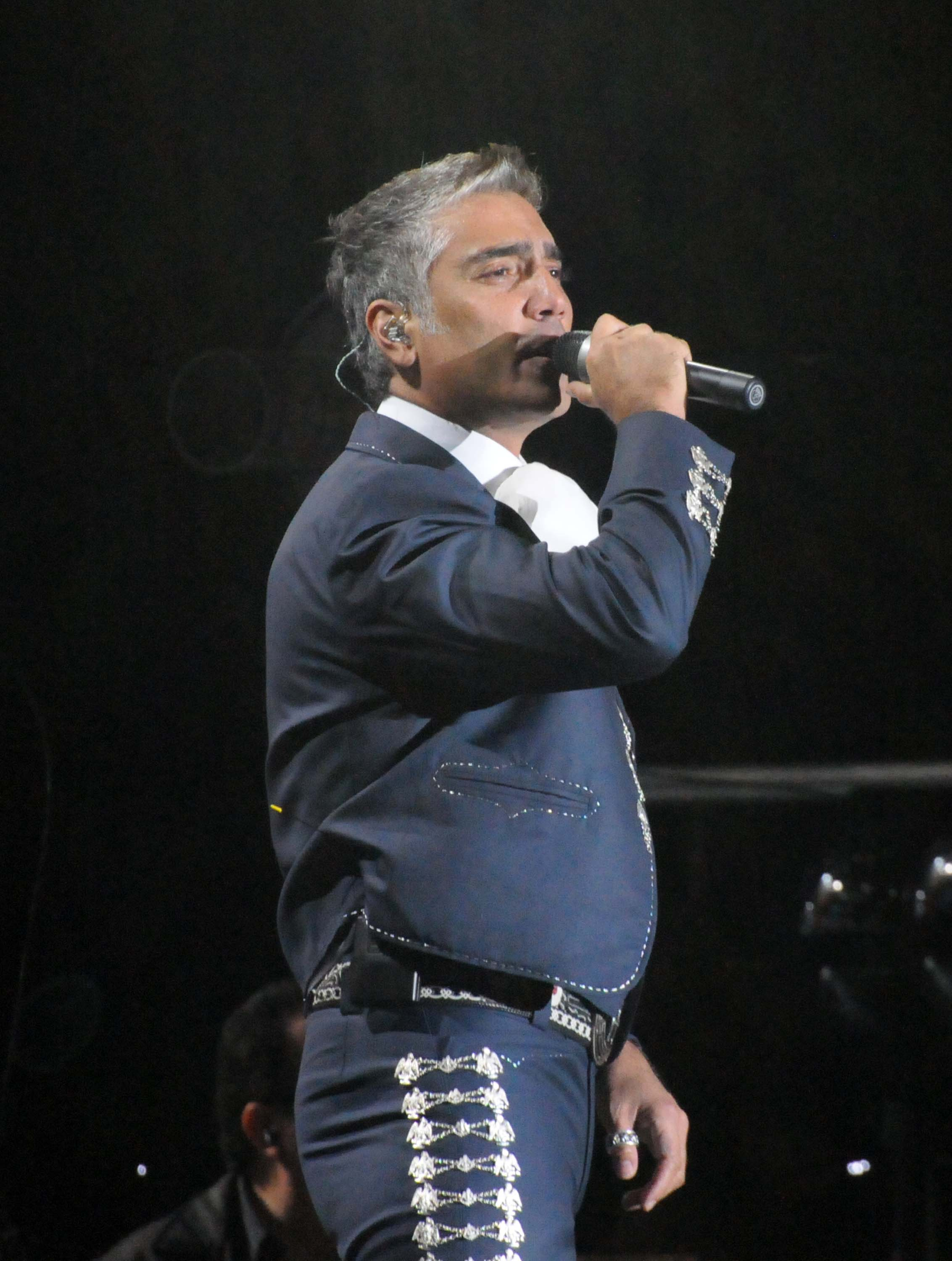
Alejandro Fernández

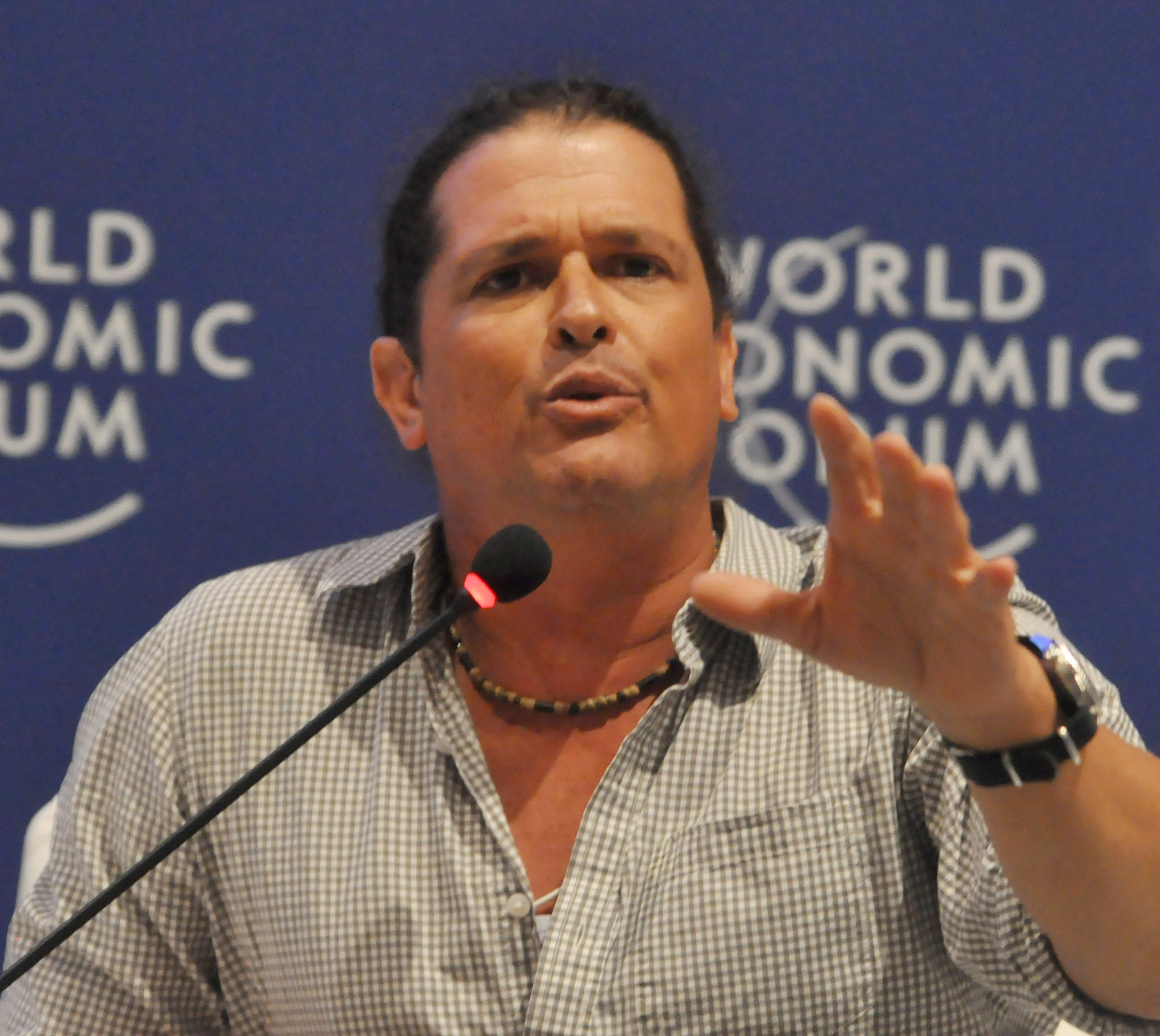
Carlos Vives

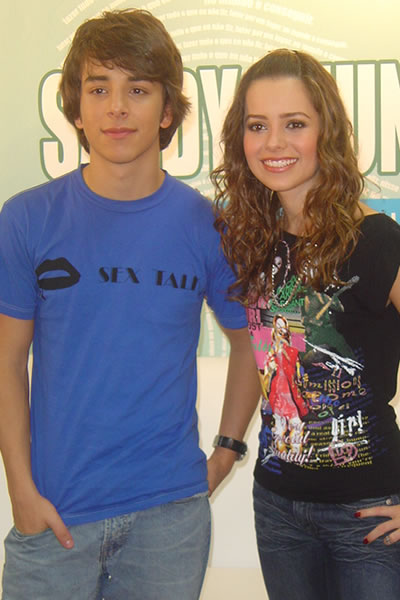
Sandy & Junior

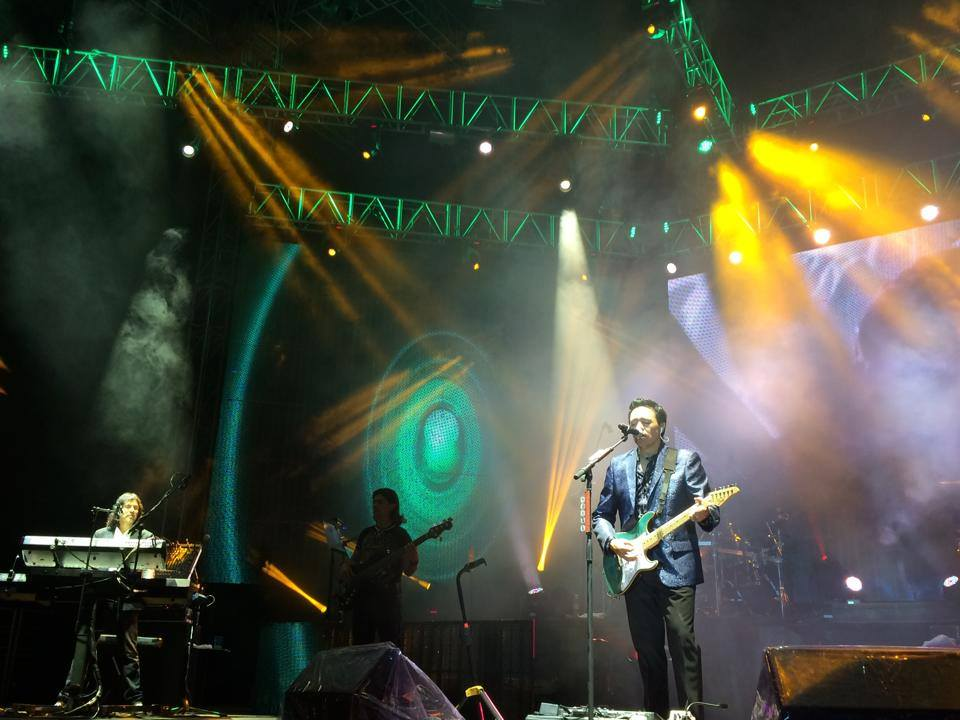
Los Temerarios

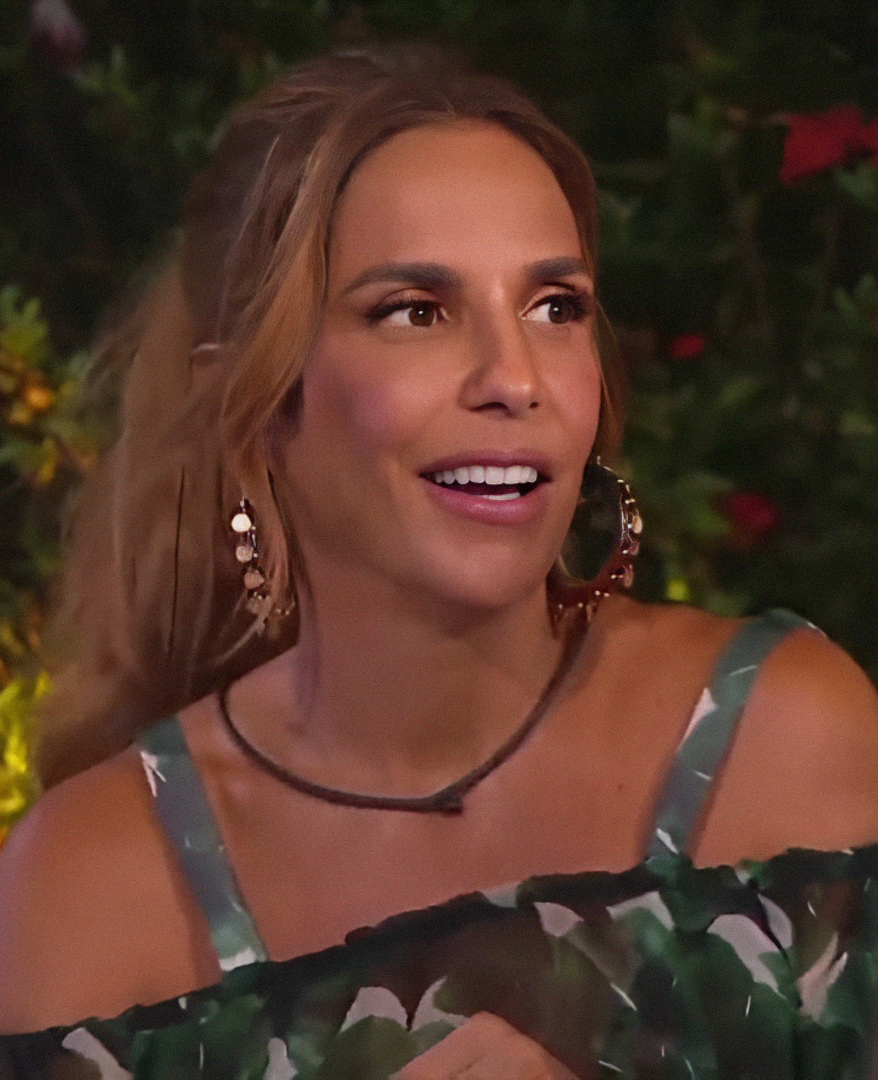
Ivete Sangalo

Artist	Country / Market	Period active	Genre	Primary language(s)	Certified Latin sales	Reported sales
Luis Fonsi	Puerto Rico	1991–present	Reggaeton, Latin pop	Spanish	32.424 million: US: 15.28 million; MEX: 3.96 million; SPA: 1.52 million; AUT: 50,000; BRA: 1.77 million; UK: 3.8 million; ITA: 775,000; GER: 2.4 million; CAN: 880,000; BEL: 100,000; FRA: 566,666; POL: 450,000; POR: 80,000; NZ: 90,000; DEN: 595,000; NOR: 100,000	20 million
Alejandro Fernández	Mexico	1988–present	Mariachi, Mexican pop	Spanish	10.7 million: US: 2.39 million; SPA: 240,000; MEX: 6.97 million; ARG: 100,000	20 million
Zezé di Camargo & Luciano	Brazil	1990–present	Sertanejo, country	Portuguese	9.3 million: BRA: 9.3 million	20 million
Carlos Vives	Colombia	1978–present	Vallenato, cumbia, Latin pop	Spanish	7.966 million: US: 5.07 million; BRA: 180,000; SPA: 880,000; MEX: 1.74 million; ITA: 75,000; CAN: 40,000; FRA: 66,666; POR: 15,000	20 million 14 million
Sandy & Junior	Brazil	1989–2007, 2019	Latin Pop	Portuguese	6.75 million: BRA: 6.75 million	20 million
Los Temerarios	Mexico	1983–present	Ballad, Romantic	Spanish	6.970 million: US: 6.15 million; MEX: 1.57 million	20 million 18 million
Ivete Sangalo	Brazil	1992–present	Axé	Portuguese	6.4 million: BRA: 6.44 million	20 million
Ricardo Arjona	Guatemala	1985–present	Latin pop, Latin ballad, folk, a capella	Spanish	6.81 million: US: 2.26 million; MEX: 3.11 million; ARG: 1.39 million; CHI: 50,000	20 million
Banda el Recodo	Mexico	1938–present	Banda	Spanish	2.99 million: US: 2.03 million; MEX: 960,000; Del Pueblo...y Para el Pueblo: Platinum (250,000)	20 million
Chitãozinho & Xororó	Brazil	1969–present	Sertanejo	Portuguese	2.4 million: BRA: 2.4 million	20 million
Plácido Domingo	Spain	1950s–present	Opera, Latin	Spanish	2.18 million: US: 100,000; GER: 255,000; SPA: 1.55 million; MEX: 375,000	20 million
Hombres G	Spain	1982–1992, 2002–present	Latin pop	Spanish	0.9 million: SPA: 900,000	20 million
Dyango	Spain	1960s–present	Bolero, Latin ballad	Spanish	0.85 million: SPA: 550,000; ARG: 300,000	20 million
Yuri	Mexico	1978–present	Latin pop	Spanish	0.75 million: MEX: 750,000	20 million
Lupita D'Alessio	Mexico	1971–present	Bolero, Latin ballad	Spanish	0.13 million: MEX: 130,000	20 million
Menudo	Puerto Rico	1977–1997, 2007–2009, 2022-present	Latin Pop, Pop Rock	Spanish	—N/a	20 million
Paquita la del Barrio	Mexico	1970–present	Bolero, mariachi	Spanish	—N/a	20 million
Diego Verdaguer	Argentina	1970–2022	Latin ballad	Spanish	—N/a	20 million
Maluma	Colombia	2010–present	Reggaeton, Latin trap, Latin pop	Spanish	25.38 million: US: 11.51 million; MEX: 8.97 million; GER: 400,000; ITA: 1.2 million; UK: 200,000; CAN: 240,000; DEN: 45,000; FRA: 533,333; BRA: 1.87 million; SWI: 180,000	18 million
Selena	United States	1980–1995	Tecnocumbia, Cumbia, Latin Pop, Musica Tejana	Spanish • English	17.35 million: US: 17 million; CAN: 0.05 million; MEX: 300,000	18 million
Leandro e Leonardo	Brazil	1983–1998	Sertanejo	Portuguese	4.05 million: BRA: 4.05 million	17 million
Rocio Jurado	Spain	1960–2006	Ballad, Latin Pop, Flamenco, copla	Spanish	0.97 million: SPA: 970,000	17 million 16 million
Padre Marcelo Rossi	Brazil	1997–present	Latin Christian	Portuguese	8.9 million: BRA: 8.9 million	16 million
Paloma San Basilio	Spain	1970–present	Latin pop	Spanish	0.45 million: SPA: 450,000	16 million
Lucero	Mexico	1980–present	Mexican pop, Latin pop	Spanish	1.35 million: MEX: 1.35 million	16 million
Ozuna	Puerto Rico	2012–present	Reggaeton, Latin Trap, Urbano	Spanish	25.13 million: US: 18.3 million; MEX: 4.2 million; ITA: 1.975 million; FRA: 1,166,666; UK: 600,000; BRA: 40,000; GER: 600,000; DEN: 90,000; NOR: 120,000; AUT: 155,000; CAN: 400,000; NZ: 15,000; SWI: 50,000	15 million
Juanes	Colombia	2000–present	Rock en Español, Latin Pop, Cumbia	Spanish	9.005 million: US: 4.71 million; GER: 450,000; BRA: 30,000; NLD: 40,000; SPA: 970,000; SWE: 40,000; MEX: 2.37 million; ARG: 160,000; SWI: 75,000; BEL: 25,000; DEN: 8,000; AUT: 15,000; FIN: 51,811; POR: 60,000	15 million
Don Omar	Puerto Rico	1996–2017; 2019–present	Reggaeton	Spanish	8.87 million: US: 6.8 million; SPA: 180,000; ITA: 115,000; BEL: 15,000; DEN: 180,000; GER: 1.05 million; JPN: 0.1 million; SWE: 160,000; SWI: 30,000; UK: 400,000 million	15 million
Los del Río	Spain	1973–2008	Latin pop, sevillanas	Spanish	6.83 million: US: 4 million; GER: 750,000; UK: 600,000; FRA: 750,000; AUS: 245,000; NLD: 75,000; SPA: 200,000; SWE: 25,000; BEL: 100,000; SWI: 25,000; AUT: 50,000; NZ: 10,000	15 million
Wisin & Yandel	Puerto Rico	1998–2013, 2018–2022	Reggaeton	Spanish	6.665 million: US: 5.03 million; SPA: 200,000; ITA: 25,000; MEX: 1.39 million; ARG: 20,000	15 million
Chayanne	Puerto Rico	1984–present	Ballad, Latin pop, salsa, dance pop	Spanish	11.354 million: US: 1.88 million; FRA: 250,000; SPA: 2.035 million; MEX: 6.315 million; CHI: 50,000; ARG: 800,000; URU: 24,000	15 million
Roberta Miranda	Brazil	1986–present	Sertanejo	Portuguese	3.4 million: BRA: 3.4 million	15 million
RBD	Mexico	2004–2009; 2020–2023	Latin Pop, pop rock, pop, dance pop	Spanish	3.22 million: US: 1 million; MEX: 2.19 million; BRA: 30,000	15 million
Joan Manuel Serrat	Spain	1965–present	Nova Cançó	Spanish • Catalan	3.12 million: SPA: 2.5 million; MEX: 80,000; ARG: 540,000	15 million
Paulina Rubio	Mexico	1992–present	Latin Pop, Pop Rock, Dance	Spanish	3.32 million: US: 1.2 million; MEX: 1.43 million; SPA: 0.69 million	15 million
Gipsy Kings	France	1978–present	Catalan rumba, flamenco	Spanish • Instrumental	2.55 million: US: 2.5 million; SPA: 50,000	15 million
Kumbia Kings	United States	1998–2006, 2009–2010	Mexican cumbia	Spanish	2.38 million: US:2.2 million; MEX: 180,000	15 million
Juan Luis Guerra	Dominican Republic	1983–present	Latin pop, adult contemporary, Merengue, Bachata, Salsa	Spanish	2.44 million: US: 730,000; SPA: 1,350,000; BRA: 100,000; NLD: 100,000; MEX: 100,000; ARG: 60,000	15 million 10 million
Jenni Rivera	Mexico	1992–2012	Regional Mexican, Latin pop	Spanish	1.99 million: US: 1.15 million; MEX: 840,00	15 million
Pimpinela	Argentina	1981–present	Canción melódica	Spanish	1.26 million: US: 100,000; SPA: 950,000; MEX: 100,000; ARG: 210,000	15 million
José Luis Rodríguez	Venezuela	1961–present	Canción melódica, bolero, Latin pop	Spanish • Italian	0.7 million: US: 700,000	15 million
Raúl di Blasio	Argentina	1983–present	Latin Easy listening	Instrumental	0.6 million: US: 600,000	15 million
Los Chichos	Spain	1973–2008	Rumba flamenca	Spanish	0.18 million: SPA: 180,000	15 million
Daniela Romo	Mexico	1979–present	Latin pop	Spanish	0.83 million: MEX: 830,000	15 million
Pepe Aguilar	United States	1981–present	Regional Mexican, Latin ballad	Spanish	2.095 million: US: 1.31 million; MEX: 785,000	15 million
Amanda Miguel	Argentina	1980–present	Latin pop	Spanish	—N/a	15 million
Palito Ortega	Argentina	1962–2017	Rock en español	Spanish	—N/a	15 million
Roberto Leal	Portugal; Brazil	1971–2019	fado, MPB, forró	Portuguese	—N/a	15 million
Jon Secada	Cuba; United States	1984–present	Latin Pop	Spanish • English	0.1 million: MEX: 100,000	15 million

=== 10 million to 14.9 million ===
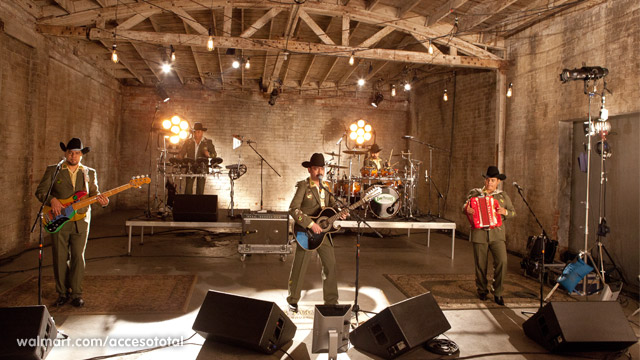
Los Tucanes de Tijuana

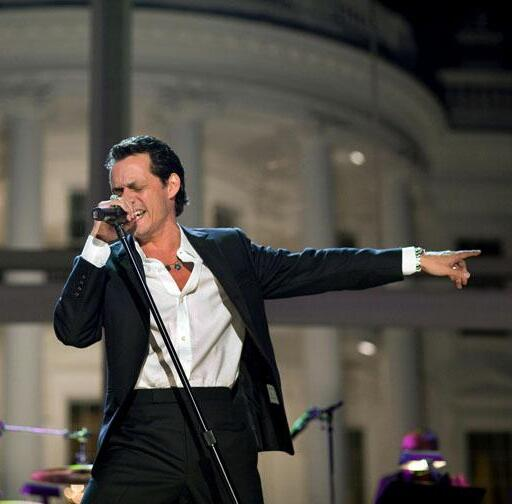
Marc Anthony

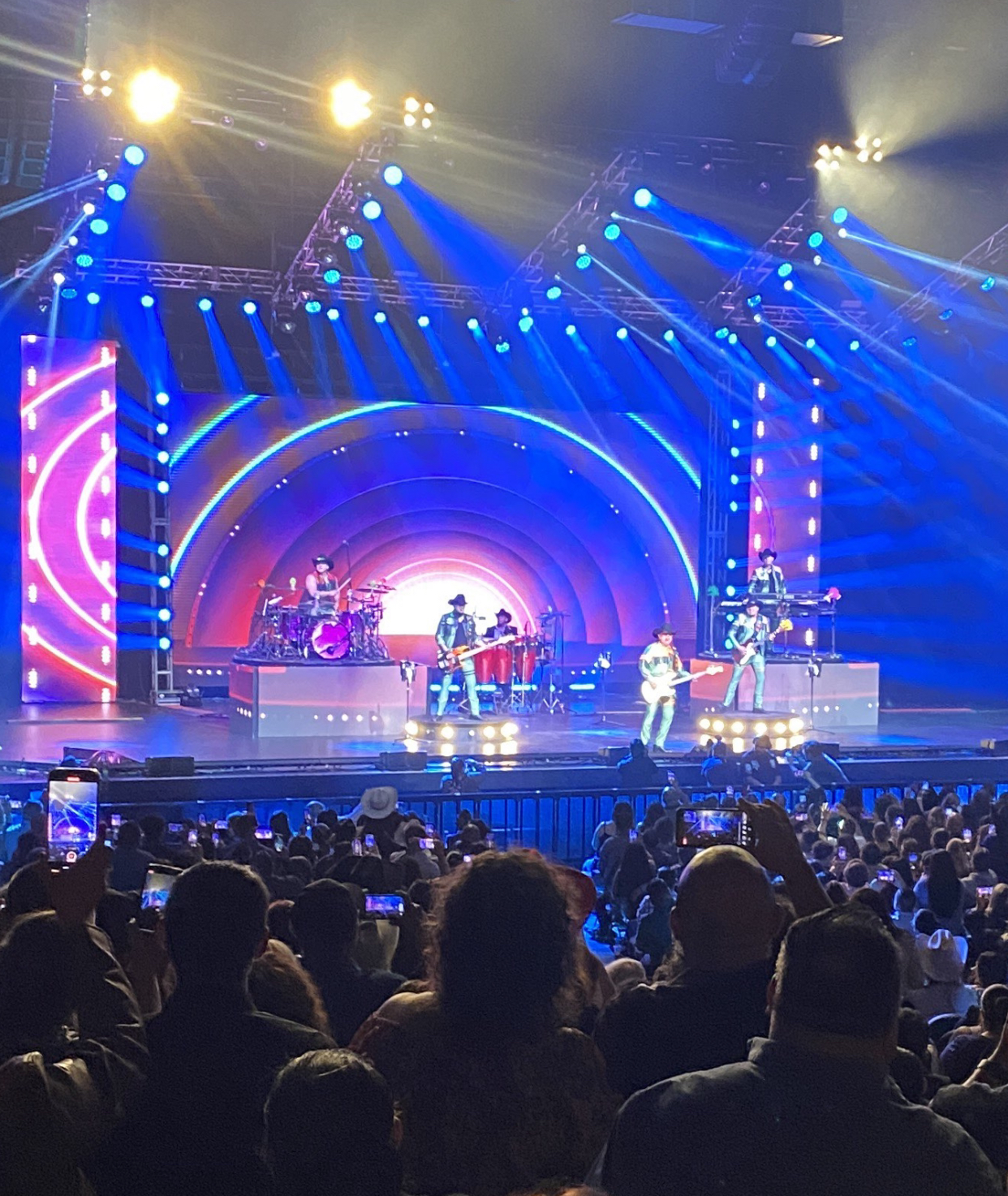
Bronco

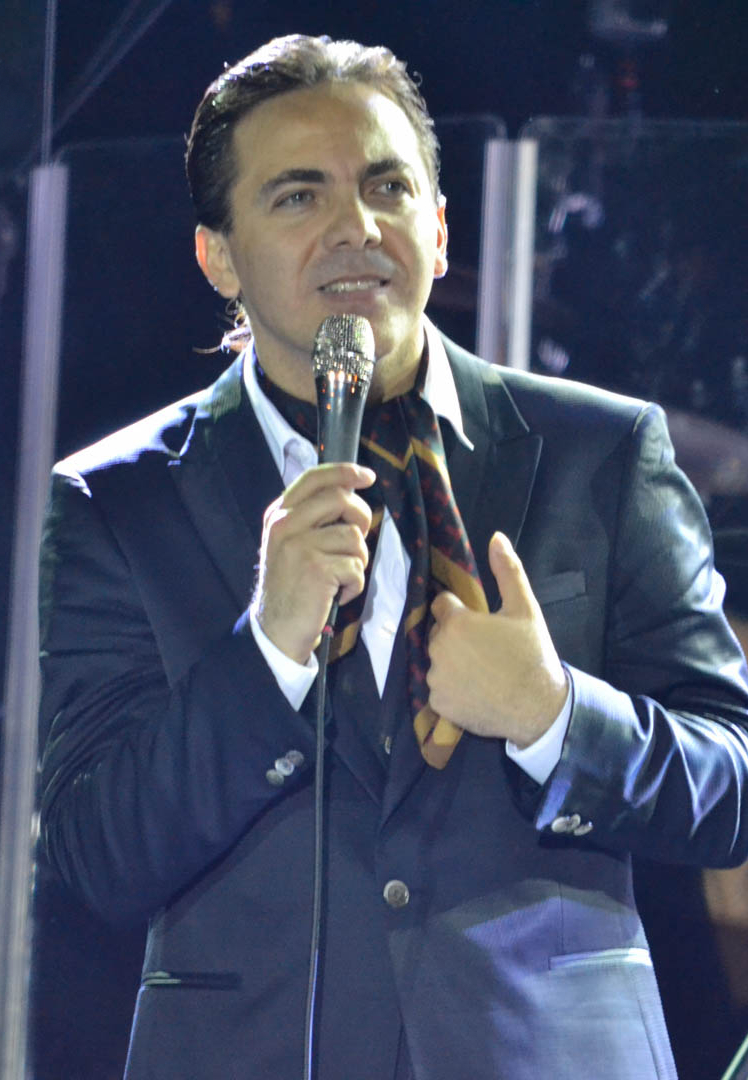
Cristian Castro

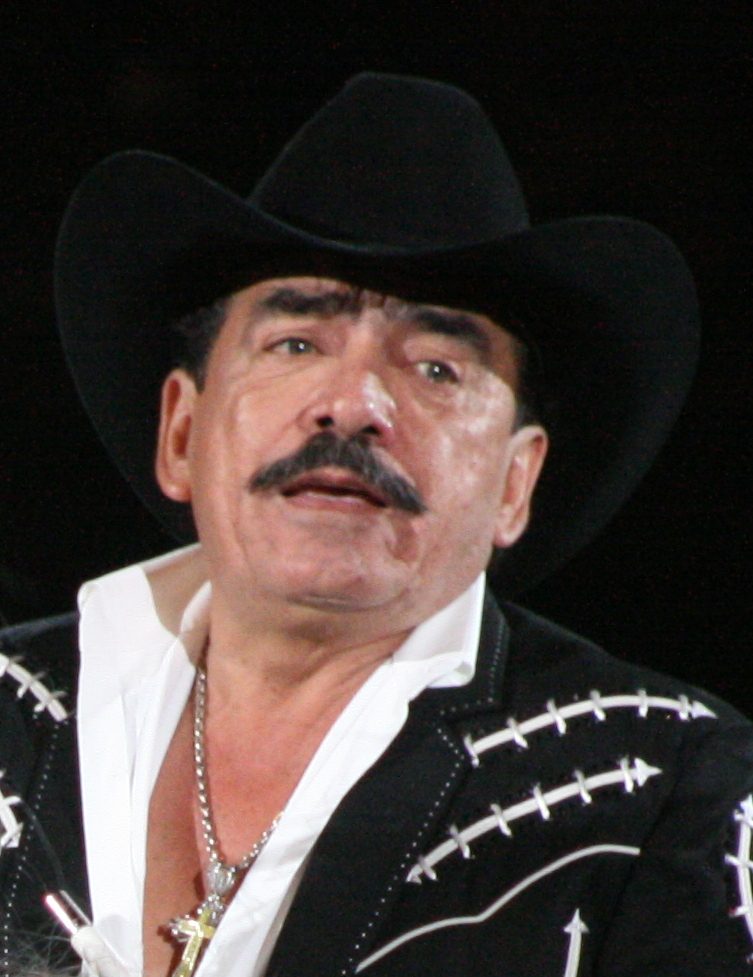
Joan Sebastian

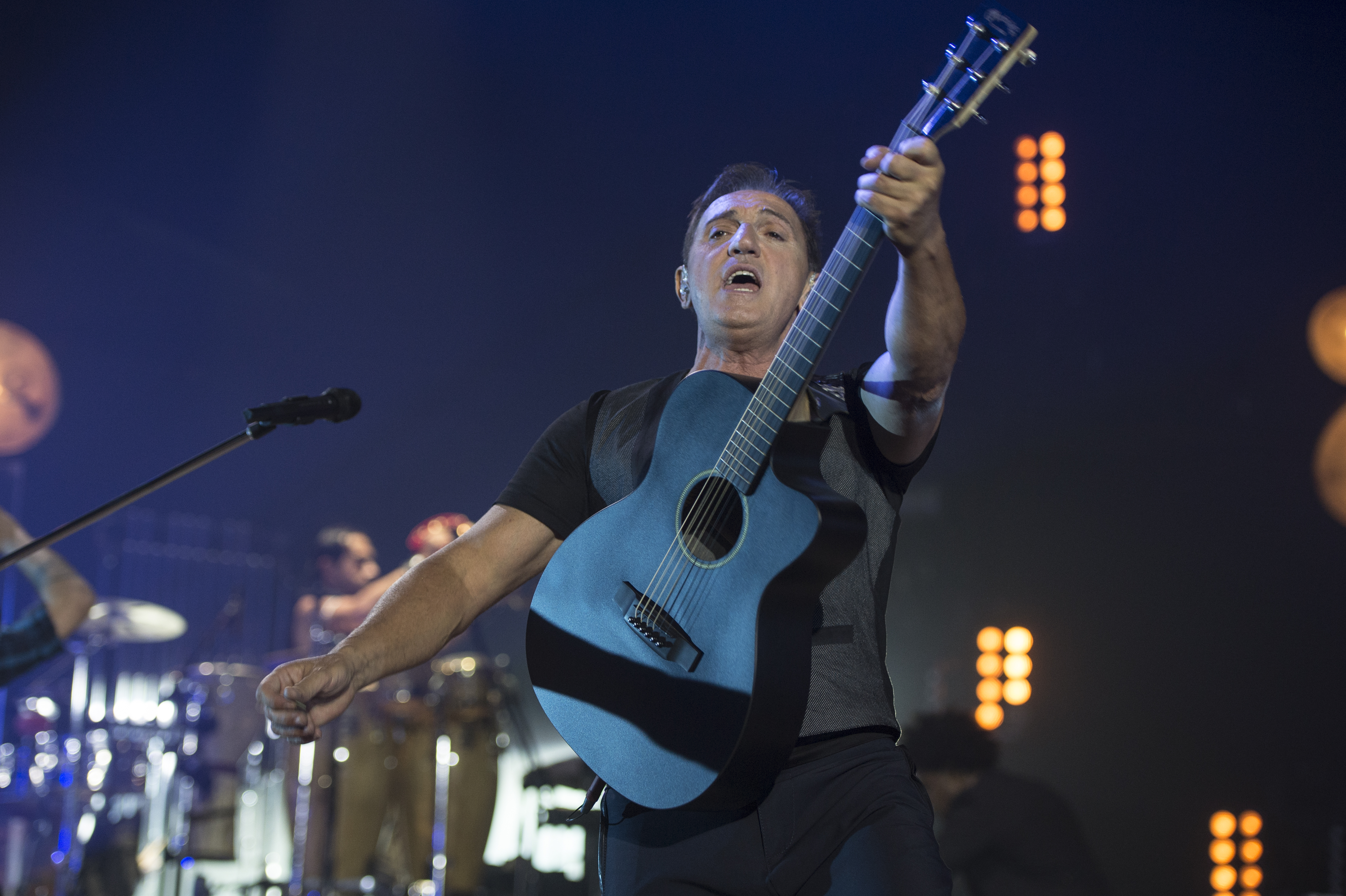
Franco De Vita

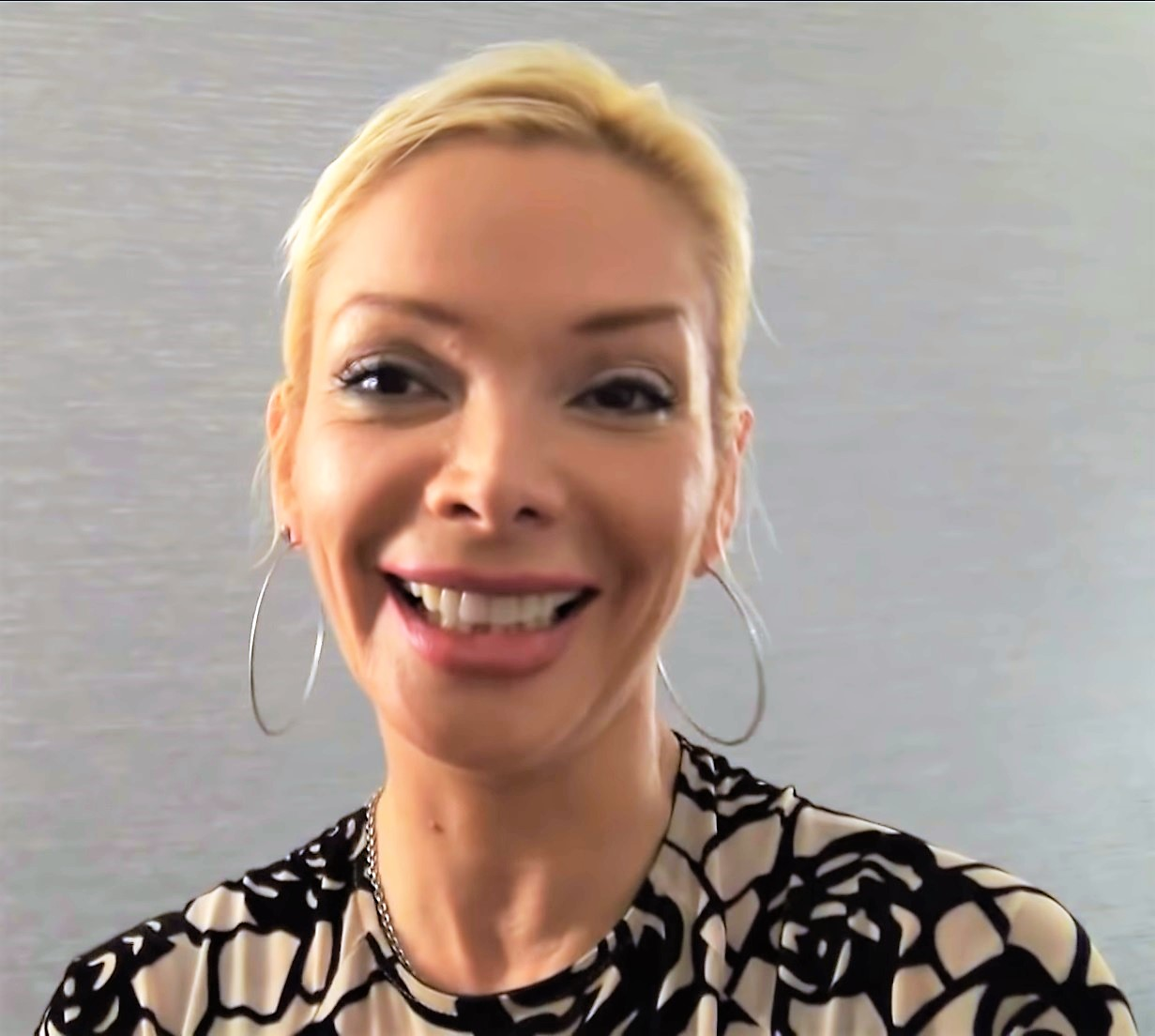
Marisela

Artist	Country / Market	Period active	Genre	Primary language(s)	Certified Latin sales	Reported sales
Nino Bravo	Spain	1969–1973	Latin pop	Spanish	0.96 million: SPA: 960,000	14 million
Parchís	Spain	1979-1992	Children's music	Spanish	—N/a	14 million
Los Tucanes de Tijuana	Mexico	1987–present	Norteño	Spanish	2.98 million: US: 2.15 million; MEX: 830,000	13 million 10 million
Marc Anthony	United States	1987–present	Salsa, Latin pop	Spanish • English	9.085 million: US: 6.21 million; ITA: 100,000; SPA: 850,000; MEX: 1.90 million; POL: 25,000	12 million
Bronco	Mexico	1979–1997, 2003–present	Grupero	Spanish	4.87 million: US: 1.61 million; MEX: 2.76 million	12 million
Cristian Castro	Mexico	1991–present	Latin pop, bolero, mariachi	Spanish	4.035 million: US: 1.8 million; MEX: 1.825 million; SPA: 150,000; ARG: 410,000	12 million 10 million
Joan Sebastian	Mexico	1975–2015	Regional Mexican	Spanish	0.88 million: US: 700,000; MEX: 180,000	12 million
Franco De Vita	Venezuela	1982–present	Latin pop	Spanish • Italian	0.83 million: US: 50,000; MEX: 780,000	12 million
Marisela	United States	1981–present	Baladas, Latin pop	Spanish	0.15 million: US: 150,000	12 million
Só Pra Contrariar	Brazil	1989–present	Pagode	Portuguese	5.24 million: BRA: 5.24 million	11 million
Daniela Mercury	Brazil	1981–present	Latin pop, axé, samba reggae, MPB	Portuguese	2.4 million: BRA: 2.4 million	11 million
Prince Royce	United States	2009–present	Bachata	Spanish	16.31 million: US: 14.17 million; MEX: 1.56 million; ITA: 300,000; BRA: 30,000; SPA: 250,000	10 million
Bruno & Marrone	Brazil	1985–present	serteneja	Portuguese	7.08 million: BRA: 7.08 million	10 million
Miguel Bosé	Spain	1977–present	Latin pop	Spanish • Italian	4.555 million: US: 100,000; SPA: 2.180 million; MEX: 1.875 million	10 million
Joaquin Sabina	Spain	1978–present	Latin, rock, trova	Spanish	4.52 million: SPA: 3.54 million; ARG: 840,000; MEX: 140,000	10 million
Julieta Venegas	Mexico; United States	1992–present	Pop rock, indie pop, alternative music, folk rock	Spanish	4.085 million: US: 2.16 million; SPA: 720,000; MEX: 1.125 million; ARG: 80,000	10 million
Intocable	United States	1993–present	Norteño	Spanish	2.95 million: US: 1.7 million; MEX: 1.7 million	10 million
Isabel Pantoja	Spain	1970s–present	Copla, Canción melódica	Spanish	2.56 million: SPA: 2.5 million; ARG: 60,000	10 million
Rosana Arbelo	Spain	1996–present	Latin pop, Folk, Pop rock	Spanish	2.36 million: SPA: 2 million; ARG: 360,000	10 million
Ricardo Montaner	Argentina; Venezuela	1976–present	Latin ballad, Latin pop	Spanish	1.94 million: US: 500,000; MEX: 930,000; Un Toque de Misterio: Platinum (250,000)Amado, Lina (30 September 1990). "Ricardo Montaner". El Informador (in Spanish). p. 16-E.; En el Último del Lugar: Platinum (250,000)Calzada, Gloria (5 July 1991). "Comentarios de...". El Informador (in Spanish). p. 12-E.; ARG: 510,000	10 million
Juan Pardo	Spain	1962-2004	Pop, rock	Spanish	1.45 million: SPA: 1.45 million	10 million
Diego Torres	Argentina	1980s–	Latin pop	Spanish	1.348 million: US: 60,000; MEX: 380,000; ARG: 908,000	10 million
Los Bukis	Mexico	1973–1996, 2021–present	Grupera	Spanish	1.5 million: MEX:1.3 million	10 million
Emmanuel	Mexico	1976–present	Latin ballad, Latin pop	Spanish	1.39 million: SPA: 50,000; MEX: 1.24 million	10 million
Manuel Mijares	Mexico	1985–present	Mexican pop, folk, mariachi	Spanish	1.34 million: MEX: 1,090,000	10 million
Fey	Mexico	1979–present	Latin pop	Spanish	1.11 million: MEX: 1,110,000	10 million
Pandora	Mexico	1985–present	Latin pop, Latin ballad, ranchera	Spanish	1.035 million: MEX: 1,020,000; CHI: 15,000	10 million
Sandro	Argentina	1959–2010	Rock and roll, Latin pop, canción melódica	Spanish	0.57 million: ARG: 570,000	10 million
Celia Cruz	Cuba; United States	1948–2003	Salsa	Spanish	0.5 million: US: 500,000	10 million
Mari Trini	Spain	1968-2008	Latin ballad	Spanish	0.4 million: SPA: 400,000	10 million
Banda Calypso	Brazil	1999–2015	Calipso, cumbia, lambada, zouk, merengtheue, carimbó	Portuguese	0.35 million: BRA: 350,000	10 million
Galy Galiano	Colombia	1981–present	Mariachi, norteño, Latin pop, salsa	Spanish	0.1 million: MEX: 100,000	10 million
Valeria Lynch	Argentina	1969–present	Balada	Spanish	0.02 million: ARG: 20,000	10 million
Miguel Gallardo	Spain	1971–2005	Latin pop	Spanish	—N/a	10 million
Los Baby's	Mexico	1958–present	Latin rock and roll	Spanish	—N/a	10 million
Ariel Ramírez	Argentina	1938–2005	Folklore	Spanish	—N/a	10 million
Diomedes Díaz	Colombia	1976–2013	Vallenato	Spanish	—N/a	10 million

== See also ==
- List of best-selling Latin albums
- List of best-selling Latin singles
- List of best-selling music artists

== Notes ==
The reported sales may include non Spanish/Portuguese recordings that are otherwise omitted from total certified units.
