= Miguel Gallardo (singer) =

Spanish singer (1949–2005)

- Also known as: Eddy Gallardo
- Born: José Miguel Gallardo Vera; September 29, 1950; Granada, Andalusia, Spain
- Died: November 11, 2005 (aged 55) Madrid, Spain
- Genres: Latin ballad
- Occupation: Singer-songwriter

José Miguel Gallardo Vera known by his stage name Miguel Gallardo (September 29, 1950 – November 11, 2005) was a Spanish singer-songwriter. He was once married to the Spanish actress Pilar Velázquez. At the time of his death, he was married to Elizabeth Irizarry.

== Background ==
Miguel Gallardo started his music career as a songwriter, composing songs for other artists. He started his own career as a singer in 1972 under the alias Eddy Gallardo. His first songs as Eddy Gallardo were "Billy Bom", "Jenny", "Sentimiento", and "Explosion de Amor" all of which were released as singles. One year later, he changed his stage name to Miguel Gallardo and released several singles including "Quédate" which was inspired by Pablo Neruda's poem Farewell and peaked at number one on the Spanish singles chart. In 1975, Gallardo recorded his first studio album Autorretrato which contained the lead single "Hoy Tengo Ganas de Ti" and was released by EMI Records. Gallardo died from renal cancer in 2005 and his remains were cremated.

== See also ==
- List of best-selling Latin music artists
