= Los Pasteles Verdes =

Peruvian Latin pop group

- Origin: Chimbote, Peru
- Genres: Latin ballad, psychedelic pop
- Years active: 1973–present
- Members: Hugo Acuña; Dubbie Acuña; Richie Acuña; Kike Gamez; Victor Hugo Acuña Jr.
- Past members: Luis Alberto “Rabanito” Rios; German Laos; Cesar Vargas; César Acuña; Tommy Lamas; Tito Cerna; Jorge Luis Príncipe; Miguel Moreno; Juan Vasquez; Adan Zavaleta; Guillermo Araujo; Raul Padilla; Aldo Guibovich; Fernando Arias; Gustavo Cano

Los Pasteles Verdes was a Latin pop group most popular in the 1970s. They originated in Chimbote, Peru, but performed for many years in Mexico.

== History ==
Los Pasteles Verdes was founded by guitarist Víctor Hugo Acuña and keyboardist Cesar Acuña, who are brothers; they had previously played together in The Jeekstones and Los Benkers. In 1973 they formed Los Pasteles Verdes with Singers: Aldo Guibovich, German Laos, drummer Jorge Luis Principe, bassist Miguel Moreno, and percussionist Juan Vásquez. Their first hit, a success across Latin America, was "Angelitos Negros", which preceded the release of their debut Recuerdos de Una Noche. Among their later hits were "Hipocresia" and "Esclavo y Amo".

The group made a significant impact on the Mexican and Mexican-American musical markets in the late 1970s. For part of the 1970s and 1980s they were based out of Mexico. They toured Japan in 2007.

== Members ==
Current

- Hugo Acuña
- Dubbie Acuña
- Richie Acuña
- Kike Gamez
- Victor Hugo Acuña Jr.

Former

- German Laos
- Luis Alberto Rios
- Cesar Vargas
- César Acuña
- Tommy Lamas
- Tito Cerna
- Jorge Luis Príncipe
- Miguel Moreno
- Juan Vasquez
- Adan Zavaleta
- Guillermo Araujo
- Raul Padilla
- Aldo Guibovich
- Fernando Arias
- Linker Sanchez
- Gustavo Mendez
