= Benidorm (disambiguation) =

Benidorm is a Mediterranean resort city in the region of Valencia, province of Alicante, Spain.

Benidorm may also refer to:

== Place ==
- Benidorm Island, a small island located off the coast of Benidorm

== Television ==
- Benidorm Bastards, a Belgian hidden-camera television show set in Benidorm
- Benidorm (British TV series), a British comedy drama series set in Benidorm
- Benidorm (Belgian TV series)

== Other ==
- Benidorm CF, a former football team based in Benidorm
- Benidorm International Song Festival, a music festival that took place annually in summer in Benidorm
- Benidorm Fest, a music festival that takes place in Benidorm to select the Spanish entry in the Eurovision Song Contest
