= Eggo (Belgian company) =

Belgian kitchen design company

Eggo Kitchen & House
- Type: Private
- Industry: Kitchen retailing, interior design, home furnishings
- Predecessor: Euro Center
- Founded: 2007
- Founder: Philippe Taminiaux
- Headquarters: Ecolys Business Park, Namur, Belgium
- Area served: Belgium, Luxembourg, Spain
- Key people: Frédéric Taminiaux (CEO)
- Number of employees: 620+ (2025)
- Divisions: The Kitchen Company
- Website: eggo.be

Eggo (stylized as èggo) is a Belgian company specializing in the design, sale and installation of fitted kitchens and custom interior solutions, including wardrobes, storage systems and furniture. The company operates primarily in Belgium, Luxembourg and Spain. It also owns "The Kitchen Company", a business-to-business division serving real-estate developers, housing providers and property professionals.

== History ==
The origins of the company date to 1979, when Belgian entrepreneur Philippe Taminiaux founded Euro Center, a chain of household appliance stores in Belgium.

In 2007, the company reorganized its activities and launched the Eggo brand, focusing on fitted kitchens and interior furnishing solutions.

During the following decade, Eggo expanded its showroom network across Belgium and entered neighboring markets. In 2014, the company opened its first showroom in Luxembourg. The Spanish subsidiary, èggo Cocinas e Interior, was launched in 2013 as part of the group's international expansion strategy.

In 2016, L'Echo reported on the company's strategy to increase its presence in the professional real-estate market through partnerships with major property developers.

In 2018, Eggo acquired My Kitchen Company, a Belgian company specializing in kitchens for residential development projects. Following the acquisition, the business was integrated into the group as "The Kitchen Company", becoming its dedicated professional division.

The company entered the Spanish market in 2015 and subsequently expanded its presence through a network of showrooms in several Spanish regions. By the mid-2020s, the company had opened locations in cities including Seville, Leganés, Las Rozas, Sestao and Finestrat.

In 2021, the company announced a partnership with the Al-Futtaim Group to introduce the Eggo concept in selected Middle Eastern markets, including Saudi Arabia and Qatar.

In 2024, the company opened a new headquarters in Namur, Belgium, and announced a multi-year investment programme intended to support growth, innovation and sustainability initiatives. In 2024, Alicia Vicente was appointed Director of Marketing and Product for the company's Spanish operations.

In 2025, Eggo announced a partnership with the Italian manufacturer ABK Group to introduce Cooking Surface technology, an integrated induction cooking system built into kitchen worktops.
