= Benidorm International Song Festival =

Annual song contest in Benidorm, Spain

Benidorm Song Festival Festival de la Canción de Benidorm
- Status: Defunct
- Genre: Spanish music
- Dates: Variable
- Locations: Benidorm, Spain
- Inaugurated: 1959
- Most recent: 2006

The Benidorm Song Festival (Spanish: Festival de la Canción de Benidorm), known as the Benidorm International Song Festival (Spanish: Festival Internacional de la Canción de Benidorm) in its last three editions, was an annual song contest held in Benidorm, Spain. The contest, based on the Italian Sanremo Music Festival, was created to promote the city as a tourism destination and Spanish music.

The festival, which used to take place in the summer, ran for 39 editions between 1959 and 2006. It was not held in 1979, 1984, and 1986–1992. Starting in 2022, a revamped version of the festival, under the name Benidorm Fest, has been held by Radiotelevisión Española (RTVE) and the Generalitat Valenciana; it served to select the Spanish entry for the Eurovision Song Contest up to 2025.

The festival underwent considerable modifications over the years, such as in the prizes. In 2004, it went from national to international. The contest was usually broadcast on radio or television by Red de Emisoras del Movimiento (1959), Televisión Española (1960–1985, 1997–2005), Telecinco (1993–1996), or Canal Nou (1997–2006).

== History ==
In 1958, at El Tío Quico kiosk in Benidorm, the mayor of the city, Pedro Zaragoza, the writer and journalist Carlos Villacorta, director of the press office of the General Secretariat of the Movement, and the journalist Teodoro Delgado Pomata, came up with the idea of holding a Spanish summer song festival like the Sanremo Music Festival what had been done in Sanremo, Italy, since 1951. In July 1959, the first edition of the Festival Español de la Canción de Benidorm (Spanish Song Festival of Benidorm) was organised by the Red de Emisoras del Movimiento (REM) at the city's Manila Park.

The mechanics of the festival during the first editions (from 1959 to 1971) consisted of presenting the songs in double version by two performers, as was usual in the song festivals of the moment, including Sanremo. The victory of the song "Un telegrama" and its huge success in Spain guaranteed the continuity of the festival in Benidorm, despite the fact that some cities in the south of the country tried to take over the organisation of the festival. During this period, the festival produced its greatest hits, such as "Comunicando", "Quisiera ser", "Tu loca juventud", "La vida sigue igual", and "Amor amargo". It also featured the participation of emerging personalities of Spanish light music, such as Dúo Dinámico, Raphael, Bruno Lomas, Joe y Luis, Michel, Los Gritos, and Julio Iglesias. In addition, although it was not their catapult to success, during these years artists such as Karina, Víctor Manuel, Lolita Garrido, Manolo Otero, and Rosa Morena, also participated in the festival.

On the other hand, the period between 1972 and 1985 marked a certain decline of the festival. The press repeated year after year that the quality of the songs was descending and in fact, during these years, the festival only released the hit "Soledad", by Emilio José and awarded prizes to soloists such as Eduardo Rodrigo, Juan Erasmo Mochi, Juan Camacho, or Dyango and songwriters such as Juan Pardo, Dúo Dinámico, or El Lute. Other participants were Betty Missiego, Braulio, Tito Mora, José Vélez, Beatriz Carvajal, Nydia Caro, Andrés Caparrós, Bacchelli, or Tino Casal. The changes in the musical and audiovisual panorama brought by the political transition to democracy led to a growing lack of interest in the festival. The non celebration of the 1979 and 1984 editions and experimental editions in 1983 (non-competitive) and 1985 (which searched for a younger audience, inviting pop-rock groups such as Alphaville, Seguridad Social, or Aerolíneas Federales) failed to raise the interest of the public, which led to the cancellation of the festival from 1986 to 1992.

After a break of seven consecutive years, the contest was held again in 1993, beginning its third phase. In that first year, two categories were differentiated, the pop-rock final and the light song final, but from 1994 onwards, the old formula of awarding prizes to a single song was reinstated. The event became international in 2004, adopting the name of Festival Internacional de la Canción de Benidorm (Benidorm International Song Festival), and ceased to be held after its 39th edition held in 2006 due to the lack of interest from the public and the media. During these last 14 editions, the media repercussion of the festival was null, despite awarding the first prize to Alazán, Coral Segovia, and La Década Prodigiosa, and the songwriters Pablo Motos and Rosana Arbelo. Other relevant artists of the Spanish music scene who performed at this stage were Esmeralda Grao, Paco Arrojo, Pasión Vega, Luis Livingstone, Mikel Herzog, A las 10 en casa, Barei (as part of the duo Dos Puntos), Jesús Cisneros, and Inma Serrano.

The festival used to be televised live by Televisión Española (TVE), although during the 1960s and 1970s only the final was broadcast, because the festival was designed mainly for the audience present in Benidorm, not as a television programme. The final of the 1973 festival was the first broadcast by some member broadcasters of the Organización de Televisión Iberoamericana (OTI) in Ibero-America, who received it live via satellite; and the final of the 1976 festival was the first broadcast in color. The editions from 1993 to 1996 were broadcast by Telecinco and from 1997, the broadcasting returned to TVE and the regional channel Canal Nou. The 2006 edition did not have national television coverage as TVE dissociated itself from the project and was only broadcast by Canal Nou.

In Summer 2019, a commemorative exhibition to mark the 60th anniversary of the festival was held at the Museo Boca del Calvari and was visited by more than 10,000 people during its first month.

== Golden Mermaid Trophy winners ==
In 2006, the first prize winner was awarded with the Golden Mermaid Trophy (Sirenita de Oro) and €36,000 (about US$47,000) to produce a record. Second and third place winners received the Silver Mermaid Trophy (Sirenita de Plata) and the Bronze Mermaid Trophy (Sirenita de Bronce), respectively. The three prizes previously consisted of 100,000 ₧, 50,000 ₧, and 25,000 ₧, respectively.

Winners of the Benidorm Song Festival
Edition	Year	Song	Performer(s)	Songwriter(s)
1st	1959	"Un telegrama"	Monna Bell; Juanito Segarra	Gregorio García Segura; Alfredo García Segura
2nd	1960	"Comunicando"	Arturo Millán	Luis Palomar; Manuel López-Quiroga
3rd	1961	"Enamorada"	José Francis	Rafael de León; Augusto Algueró
4th	1962	"Llevan"	Raphael; Margarita Cantero	Ángel Martínez Llorente; Armando Reguero
5th	1963	"La hora"	Alberto Pestaña; Rosalía	Mario Sellés; Miguel Portolés
6th	1964	"Eternidad"	José Casas; Irán Eory	Juan Hernando
7th	1965	"Tu loca juventud"	Federico Cabo; Laura	Tomás de la Huerta; José Luis Navarro
8th	1966	"Nocturno"	Alicia Granados; Santy	Jorge Domingo
9th	1967	"Entre los dos"	Tony Dallara; Bettina	Alfredo Doménech
10th	1968	"La vida sigue igual"	Julio Iglesias; Los Gritos	Julio Iglesias
11th	1969	"Ese día llegará"	Mirla Castellanos; Koldo y Los Impactos	Manuel Alejandro
12th	1970	"Tus manos"	Donna Hightower; Joe y Luis	José Luis García Gutiérrez
13th	1971	"Mi rincón"	Ely Forcada; Roxana	Mario Sellés; Miguel Portolés
14th	1972	"A María yo encontré"	Eduardo Rodrigo	Eduardo Rodrigo
15th	1973	"Soledad"	Emilio José	José Emilio López Delgado
16th	1974	"Un camino hacia el amor"	Juan Erasmo Mochi	Juan Erasmo Mochi
17th	1975	"A ti, mujer"	Juan Camacho	Juan Pardo; Juan Camacho
18th	1976	"Si yo fuera él"	Dyango	Dyango
19th	1977	"Aléjate"	Alfonso Pahino	Manuel de la Calva; Ramón Arcusa; Jesús Gluck
20th	1978	"Toro negro"	Yunque	Manuel Azuaga; Alfonso Bueno Avilés
21st	1980	"Quisiera"	Jerónimo	Eleuterio Sánchez; Jerónimo
22nd	1981	"Y te quiero"	José Umbral	Luis Fierro
23rd	1982	"Yo pienso en ti"	Fernando Ubiergo	Fernando Ubiergo
24th	1983 (Note: In 1983 the contest became a musical exhibit without winners. Complaints against this decision emerged.)	No competition held		
25th	1985	"Portero de noche"	Círculo Vicioso	
26th	1993	"Tierra del amor" (Note: Pop-rock modality.)	El Desierto que Viene	
26th	1993	"Sabed amigos" (Note: Ballad modality.)	Romero y sus Amigos	Pablo Motos; Fernando Romero; Mar Romero
27th	1994	"Fuego y miel"	Esmeralda Grao	Rosana Arbelo
28th	1995	"Sólo amor"	Tábata Ley	José Manuel Molés
29th	1996	"Y no puedo más"	Malizzia & Malizzia	Manuel Pruaño; María José Montaño
30th	1997	"Soledad"	Diego Daniel	Juan J. Reyes Santsella
31st	1998	"Seguramente"	Enrique Casellas	Enrique Casellas
32nd	1999	"De manera espontánea"	Quintaesencia	Félix Pizarro; Alberto Estébanez
33rd	2000	"Alcanzarás la luna"	Alazán	José Antonio Granados
34th	2001	"Mi razón de vivir"	Carlos Fénix	Carlos Fénix; Alejandro de Pinedo
35th	2002	"Vida"	Marta Solís	Marta Solís; Lorenzo Suárez
36th	2003	"Enséñame"	Carlos Barroso	J. Sempere García
37th	2004	"Sweet Lady"	Guy Swimer	Guy Swimmer
38th	2005	"Maldito corazón"	Coral Segovia	David Santisteban; Marco Dettoni
39th	2006	"A ti"	La Década Prodigiosa	Santi Villar; David Villar

== Legacy ==
The 1961 film Festival en Benidorm was filmed during the second edition of the festival in 1960, showing a fictionalized version of it and featuring some of its performances such as "Eres diferente" by Los Cinco Latinos, "Luna en Benidorm" by Elia Fleta, and "Todo es nuevo" by Lolita Garrido. However, the festival's winning song, "Comunicando", is performed in the film by its star, Concha Velasco, while "Pide" is performed by actress Carmen de Lirio.
