= Puig Campana =

Mountain in Alicante, Spain

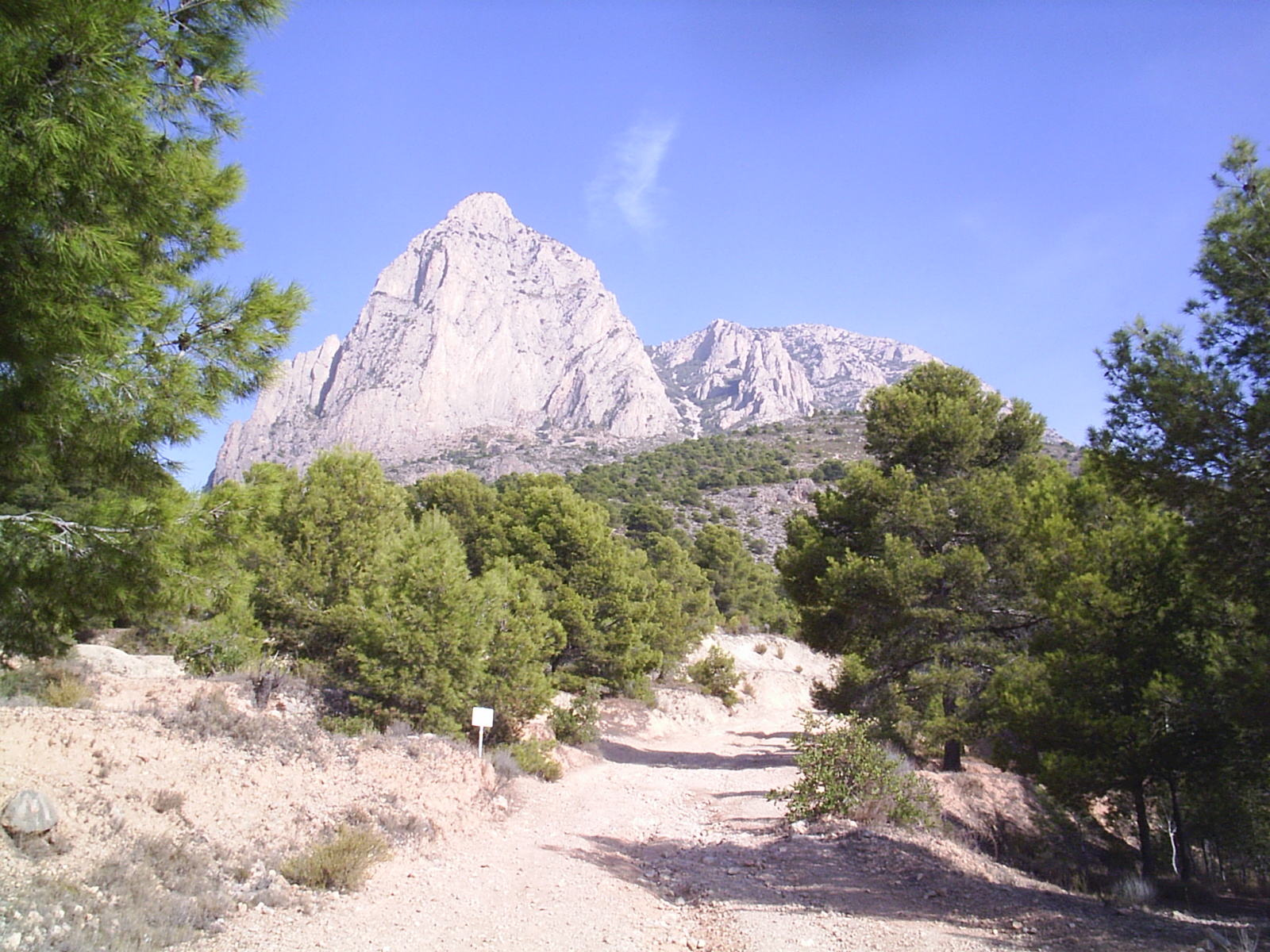
- Puig Campana

Highest point
- Elevation: 1,406 m (4,613 ft)
- Coordinates: 38°35′50″N 0°11′45″W

Geography
- Location within Spain
- Location: Marina Baixa, Province of Alicante, Valencian Community
- Country: Spain
- Parent range: Prebaetic System

Climbing
- First ascent: Unknown
- Easiest route: From Finestrat

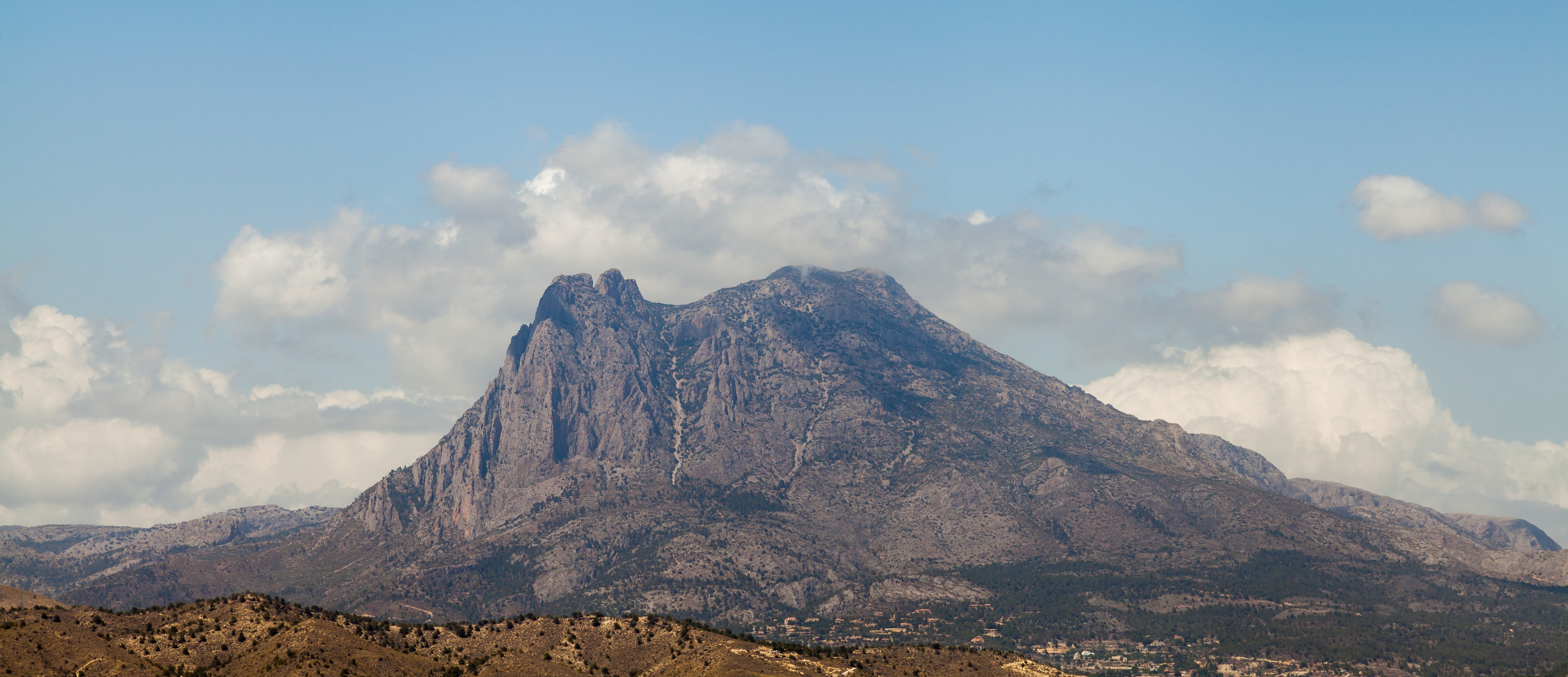
View of Puig Campana from Villajoyosa / La Vila Joiosa.

Puig Campana (Valencian: [ˈputʃ kamˈpana]; Spanish: [ˈputʃ kamˈpana]; literally translated in English as "Bell Peak") is a mountain forming part of the Prebaetic System in the southeast of Spain. With an altitude of 1,406 metres (4,613 ft), it is the second-highest peak in the province of Alicante. Puig Campana is located in the municipality of Finestrat only 10 km (6 mi) from the Mediterranean coast.

From the base of the mountain it may seem that there is only one peak, but in fact there are two, the taller of which is not easily visible from the base of the mountain. The western of the two peaks has a pronounced crack or notch, historically this feature has been known colloquially as the El Portell (The Gate) although in recent times it has come to be known by a number of other names such as Roldan's Notch (Brecha or Tajo de Roldán in Spanish).

A large part of the vegetation on the north eastern side of the mountain was burnt by a wildfire in 2009. The fire started on 24 January of that year when a high voltage electricity pylon was blown over by a strong wind. Some 1,000 hectares were reduced to ashes and around 15,000 people were evacuated from 25 urbanisations. The best method for the reforestation of the mountain is currently being studied. Although five years after the disaster the area is still in a state of complete abandon.

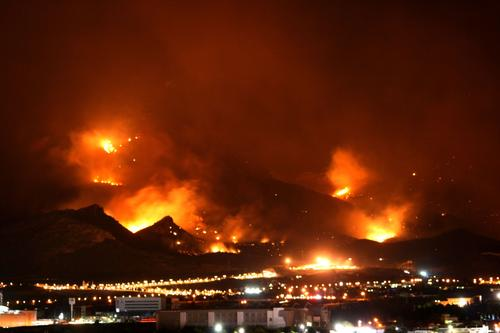
View of the forest fire that affected Puig Campana starting on 24 January 2009.

== The Legend of Puig Campana ==
The notch that is present in the western peak of Puig Campana has given rise to a number of legends, or in reality to multiple versions of the same legend.

One version of the legend is a version of the one that relates to La Brèche de Roland, which is located in the Pyrenees. The local version says that the French hero Roland, commander of Charlemagne’s army, became embroiled in a sword fight with the head of the Moorish army and the duel finished on the top of the mountain. At one moment in the battle the Moorish leader was flung to the ground and Roland lifted his sword, Durandarte, in order to deal his enemy a final blow. However, he missed the prostrate figure and the force of the blow cut a chunk out of the mountain, which fell into the sea. This rock is still visible as Benidorm Island and the gash that Roland made in the peak of the mountain still bears his name.

However, Professor B. Granier, Université de Bretagne Occidentale (Brest, France), who did field work for his PhD thesis (1987) in this area, demonstrated that the rocks at the core of the Puig Campana are Late Jurassic in age whereas the limestones cropping out in the Islote de Benidorm at Early Cretaceous (Albian) in age.

There are many versions of the legend, in another Roland's lover Alda was fated to die when the last of the sun's rays shone on her so Roland cut out part of the mountain in order that the sun would take longer to set ensuring that Alda would live a few moments longer.

== Ascent ==
The mountain may be ascended by a number of different paths, several of which converge before heading to the peak. Maps are available at the tourism office in downtown Finestrat, and there is also a small module at the trailhead at Font del Molí with some information. However, the trail, which in many places is hardly more than a narrow footpath, is badly marked, with small, faded painted symbols here and there on rocks along the way. In addition, the local landscape consists of steep slopes with much loose rock and tall scrub brush and trees, and as a result it is easy to get disoriented. Therefore, it is highly advisable to speak to the tourist office and/or the module first, and let them know you are going. Locals report that numerous tourists get lost and have to be rescued. Take water, food, and a mobile phone. There are no services along the way. From the trailhead, hike time to the summit is reported as from 5 to 8 hours round trip. Hike time on the circuit around the mountain's base without ascending to the summit is reported as from 4 to 5 hours.

The most direct line of ascent is arguably from Finestrat, starting at Font del Molí, heading towards the mountain's south face. From here, a long, steep, scree slope can be seen. It is possible (although unpleasant) to ascend the scree directly, or follow the trail which runs parallel to the scree slope on the right hand side. Both the trail and the scree slope are marked with fading red painted symbols. The trail is easy to lose in mist. From the top of the scree slope, the trail turns east towards the summit. There are many criss-crossing paths here, which makes the route difficult to follow in mist.

== See also ==
- Mountains of the Valencian Community
- Aitana (1,559 m), the highest mountain of Alicante province.
