= Finestrat =

- Town and municipality
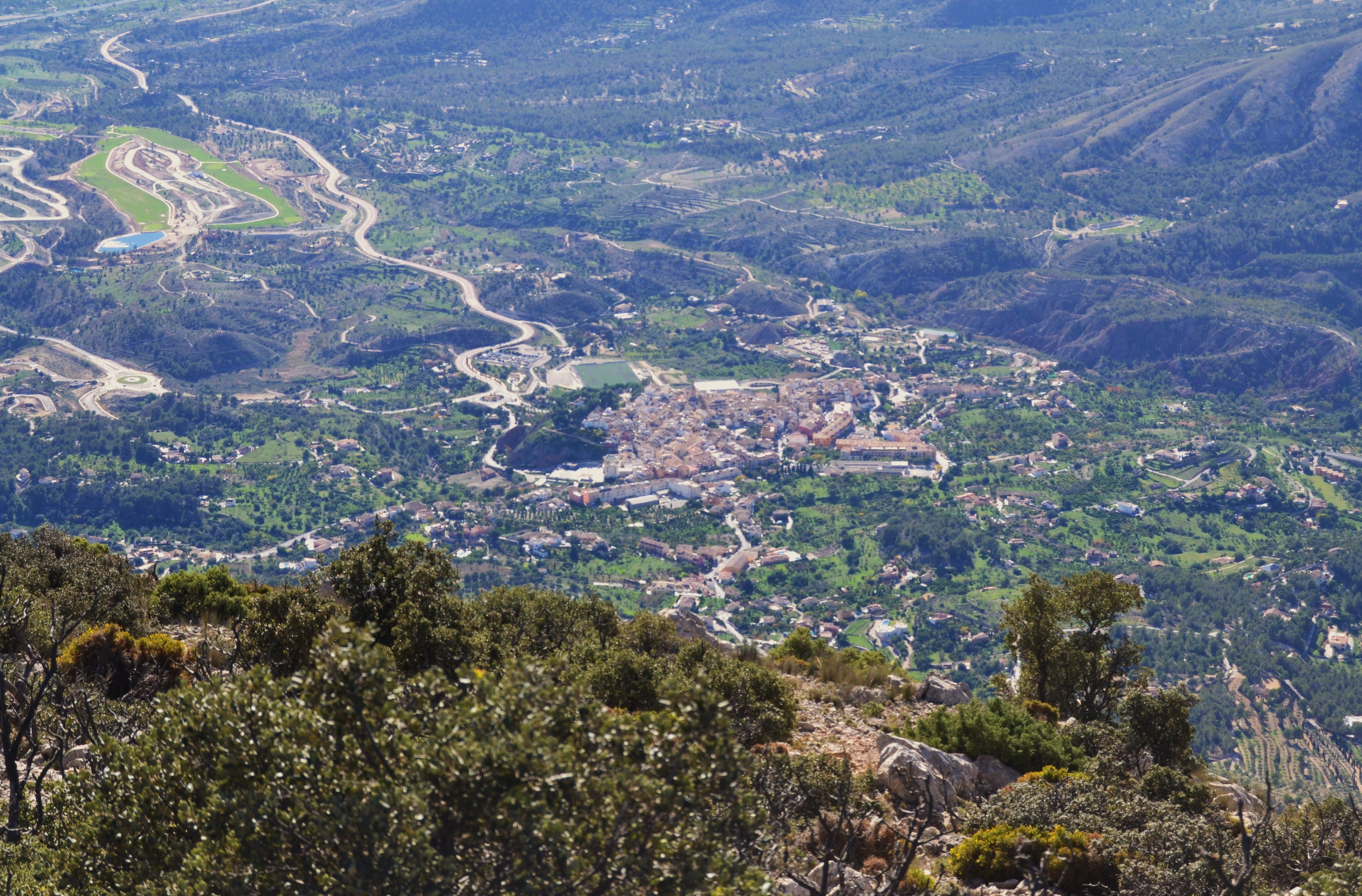

- Coat of arms

- Location of Finestrat in Spain Finestrat (Spain) Finestrat (Europe)
- Coordinates: 38°34′01″N 0°12′45″W
- Country: Spain
- Autonomous community: Valencian Community
- Province: Alicante / Alacant
- Comarca: Marina Baixa
- Judicial district: Benidorm

Government
  - Mayor: Nati Algado (PP)

Area
  - Total: 42.25 km^{2} (16.31 sq mi)
- Elevation: 238 m (781 ft)

Population (2025-01-01)
  - Total: 9,919
  - Density: 234.8/km^{2} (608.0/sq mi)
- Demonym(s): finestratí, -ina (Val.) finestratense or finestrense (Sp.)
- Time zone: UTC+1 (CET)
  - Summer (DST): UTC+2 (CEST)
- Postal code: 03500, 03509
- Official language(s): Valencian; Spanish
- Website: www.ayto-finestrat.es

Finestrat (Note: Pronunciation of Finestrat: Valencian: [finesˈtɾat] Spanish: [finesˈtɾat]) is a town and municipality in the comarca of Marina Baixa, Alicante in the Valencian Community, Spain.

== Geography ==
Finestrat is situated 12 kilometres (7.5 mi) from Benidorm and 55 kilometres (34 mi) from Alicante International Airport. Accessed by road via the motorway AP-7 and exit 65-A, from where a local road connects to the town. Finestrat can also be accessed directly from the N-332. The old town is located inland but there is also about 267 metres (876 ft) of coast from Punta del Tossal to Cala de Finestrat (es). The beach of Cala de Finestrat is bordered by the towns of La Vila Joiosa to the southwest and Benidorm to the northeast. The municipality includes the mountain Puig Campana, whose summit reaches 1,410 m (4,630 ft).

== Gallery ==
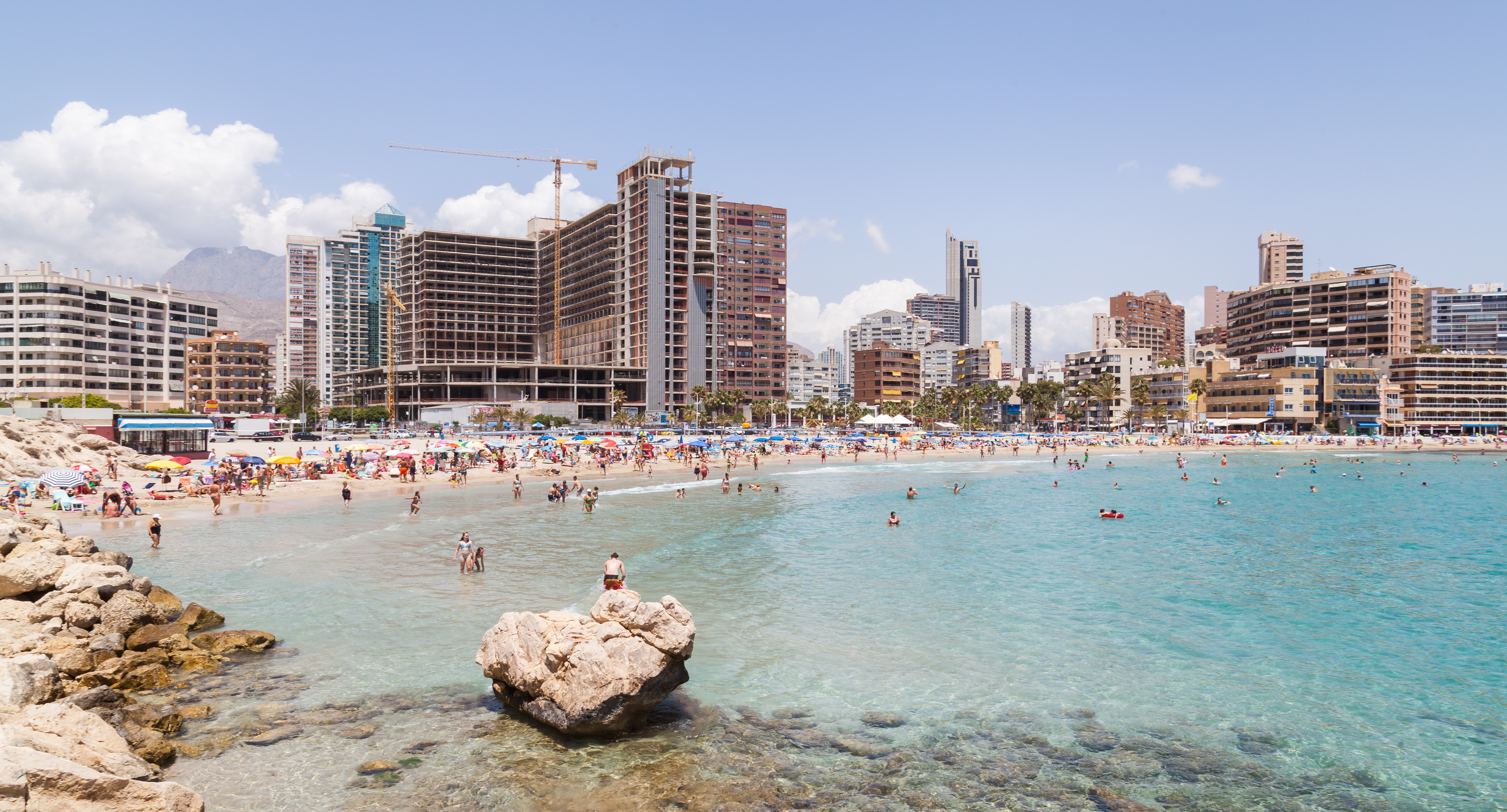
Bay of Finestrat

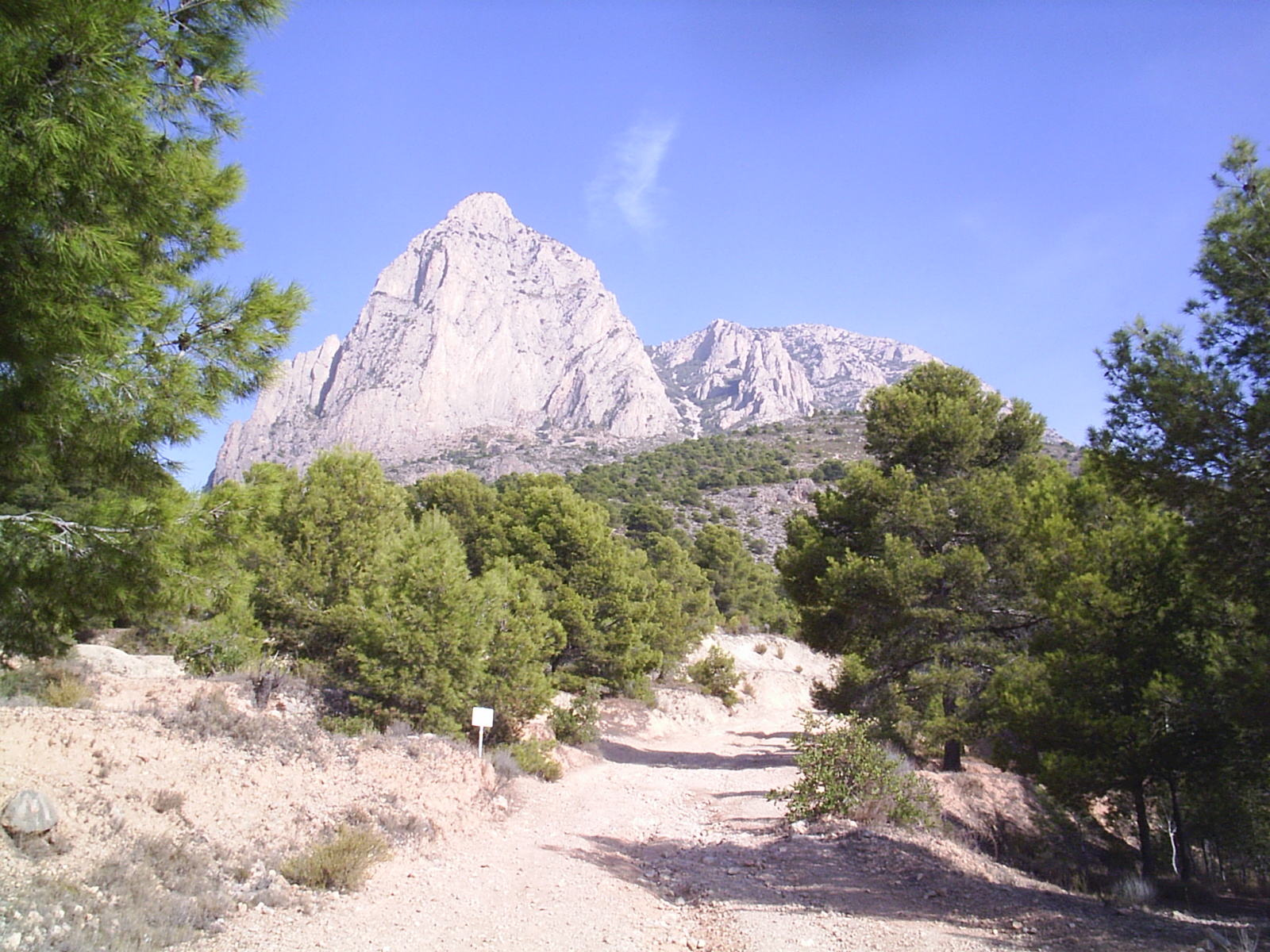
Puig Campana Mountain
