= West Beach Promenade =

Promenade in the west beach of Benidorm, Spain

Coordinates: 38.5361°N 0.1487°W

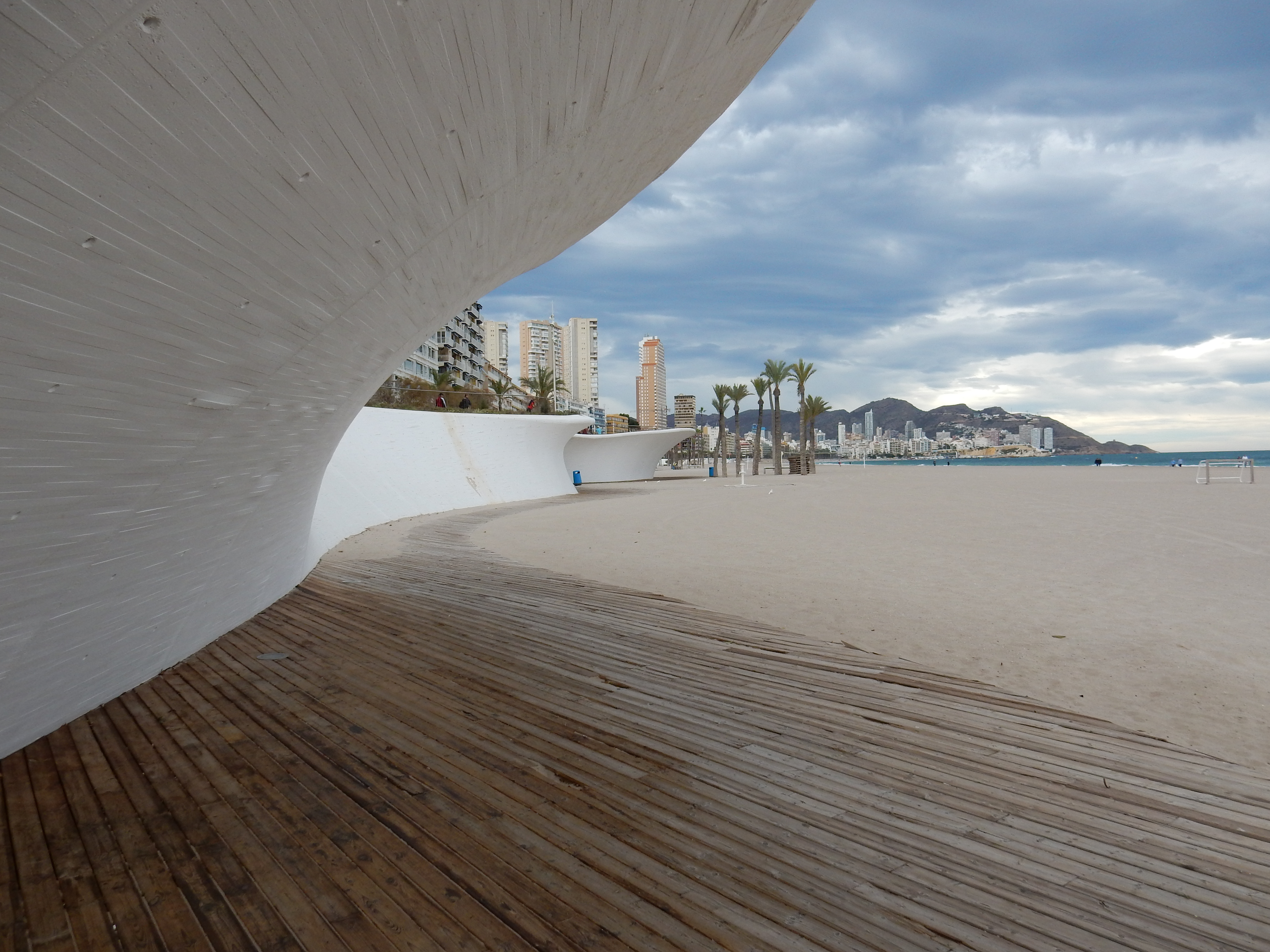
Promenade.

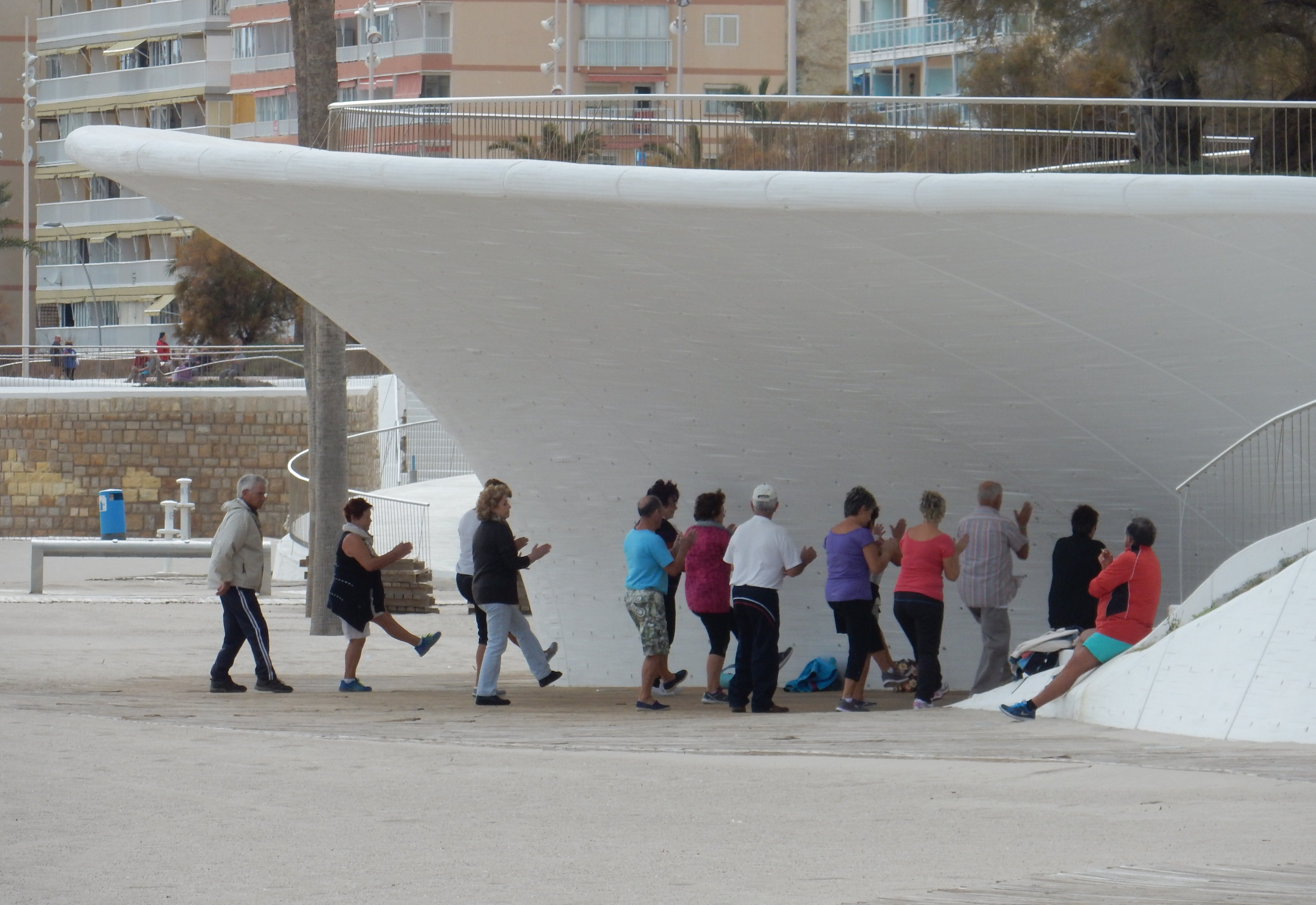
Promenade.

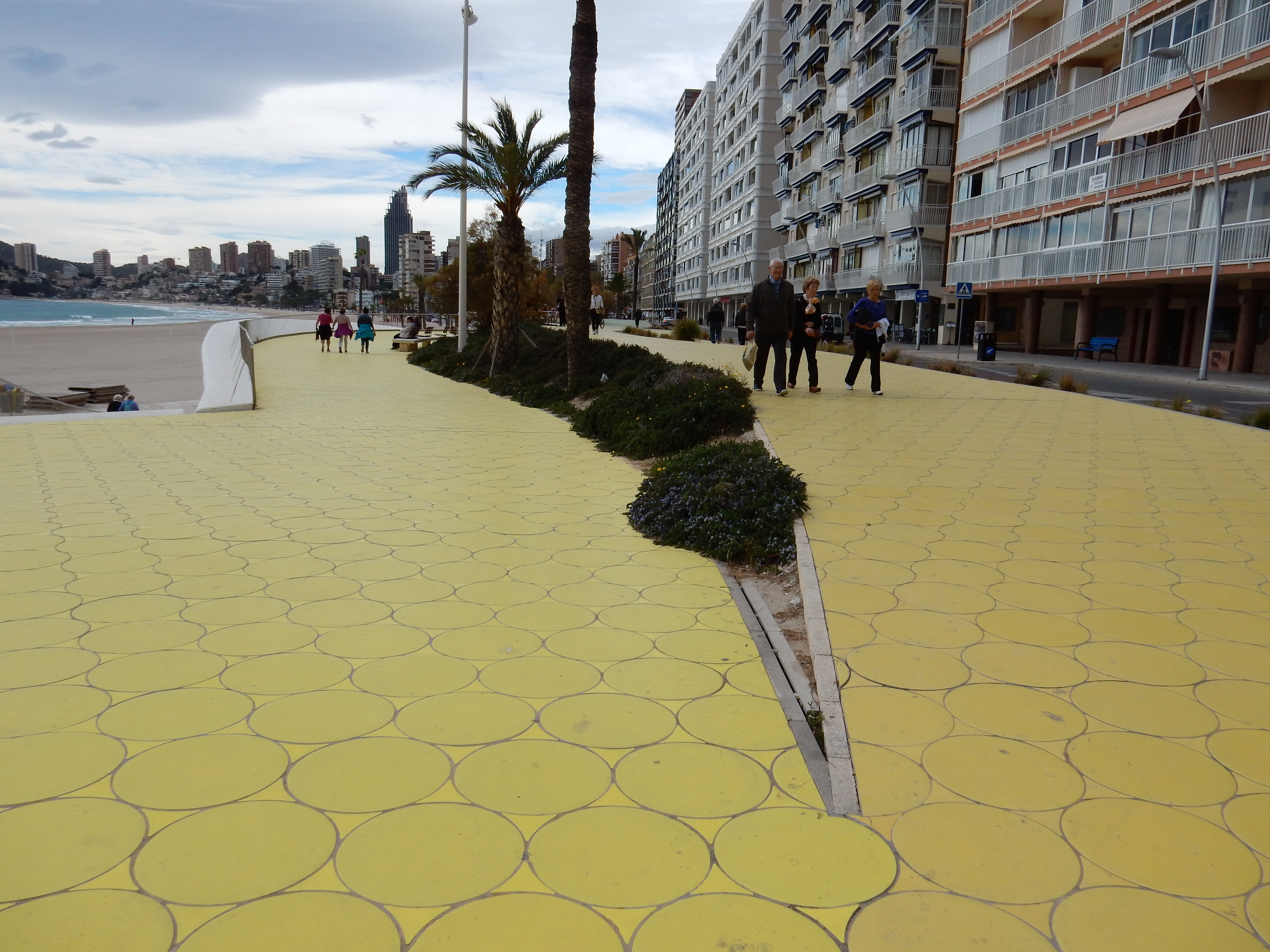
Promenade.

West Beach Promenade is the promenade located in Playa de Poniente (West Beach), one of three beaches in Benidorm, Spain.

The architects who designed this were partners Carlos Ferrater and Xavier Marti Gali. Carlos started The Office of Architecture in Barcelona (OAB) in 2006 with the help of Xavier and others.

The project has received several awards including first prize in the 2006 ASPRIMA Prizes for the best tourist development, first prize in the VIII Ceramics Awards for Architecture organized by ASCER, and special mention in the European Award of Urban Public Space 2010. In fact, it was received so well that it was commissioned to be extended an additional 500 meters.

== Background ==
Benidorm has experienced rapid economic and urban growth in the last twenty or so years. In response to the immense rise of the tourist industry, it has become a location with an extremely high population density, but only during certain months of the year. Thus, the area had been thirsting for a resolution for issues such as high traffic, drainage, and accessibility. The idea for the new passageway was conceived of by Carlos Ferrater and Xavier Marti Gali in a design competition, which sought to adapt the shoreline to deal with the problems it was facing. Construction was completed in 2009.

== Design ==
=== Form ===
The form of the design mimics the shape of the waves and cliffs. Due to the overhangs, it creates more usable space with minimal disturbance of the sandy beach underneath. This allows the people above to use it for circulation. At the same time, it provides shade for the beachgoers below. Despite the seemingly random curves, there is actually a strict adherence to a set of specific geometric laws, conducive to construction.

=== Color ===
The use of color presents an attractive gradient, suitable for vacationers on holiday. The appealing array of playful hues exudes a bright and cheerful vibe. Conveniently, it also functions as a landmark by helping beachgoers determine where exactly on the beach they are located. It is commonly understood that these types of colors reflect the sun and have a cooling effect, which is favorable for the hot summer climate of this region of Spain.

=== Material ===
==== Tiles ====
Developed specifically for this project by Keramia Ceramics, the ceramic tile have the ideal chemical makeup. Some of the qualities of the material are that it is resistant to discoloration from the silica (beach sand), stain-resistant, slip-resistant, and able to withstand wear and tear for a lifetime. Also they are non-porous so as to not absorb water. The circular and triangular shapes are formed using die cut molds, and work fluidly with the undulating slopes of the promenade. The mortar is an innovative, high tech material, known as thixotropic mortar.

==== Lighting ====
Illumination is another aspect of high efficiency. The white color and the arched shape of the concrete membrane reduce the lighting costs. This also helps to decrease the amount of light pollution, which allows for better usage at night time. An added benefit is the rhythmic pattern that the light projects onto the exterior.

==== Detailing ====
The handrails are made of stainless steel, and the benches of wood. Both were designed to be minimalist in nature so as not to detract from the composition of the promenade itself. The benches are an important part of what is considered the third, upper layer of the design. They serve as a resting place, a meeting place, or a meditation place; this usage is vital to the identity of the promenade as a distinct intermediary space.

==== Vegetation ====
Vegetation is also incorporated into this third layer and adds an important living element to the structure. Species include the Phoenix Dactylifera which is a reclaimed date palm and several types of flowers. Extensive consideration was taken in planning for appropriate greenery.

All the materials used for this project are low maintenance which reinforces its sustainability.

== Process ==
=== Design ===
During the design process, Ferrater reiterated various modes of representation that evolved over time and included drawings, cardboard models and digital models. Some have even been displayed in exhibitions in places all over the world such as Paris, Chicago, and his hometown of Barcelona.

=== Build ===
Due to the unique shape the building process was complex and required the collaboration of several manufacturers and companies. To start, a system of wooden molds were built, which eventually led to the formation of reinforced concrete.
