= Pedro Zaragoza =

Spanish politician

Pedro Zaragoza Orts

Mayor of Benidorm, Spain
- In office 1950–1967

Personal details
- Born: May 15, 1922 Benidorm, Spain
- Died: April 1, 2008 (aged 85) Benidorm, Spain
- Spouse: María Ivars
- Children: 4

Pedro Zaragoza Orts (May 15, 1922 – April 1, 2008) was the mayor of Benidorm, Spain, from 1950 to 1967. He is credited with helping turn the town into one of the most popular holiday resorts in Spain, creating "Europe's first mass tourist resort."

== Early life ==
Zaragoza was born in Benidorm to a family of poor seafarers; his father was a merchant captain. He was able to travel around the world as a child with his father seeing Sydney, London, and Singapore. He went to school in Barcelona to learn nautical studies.

== Career ==
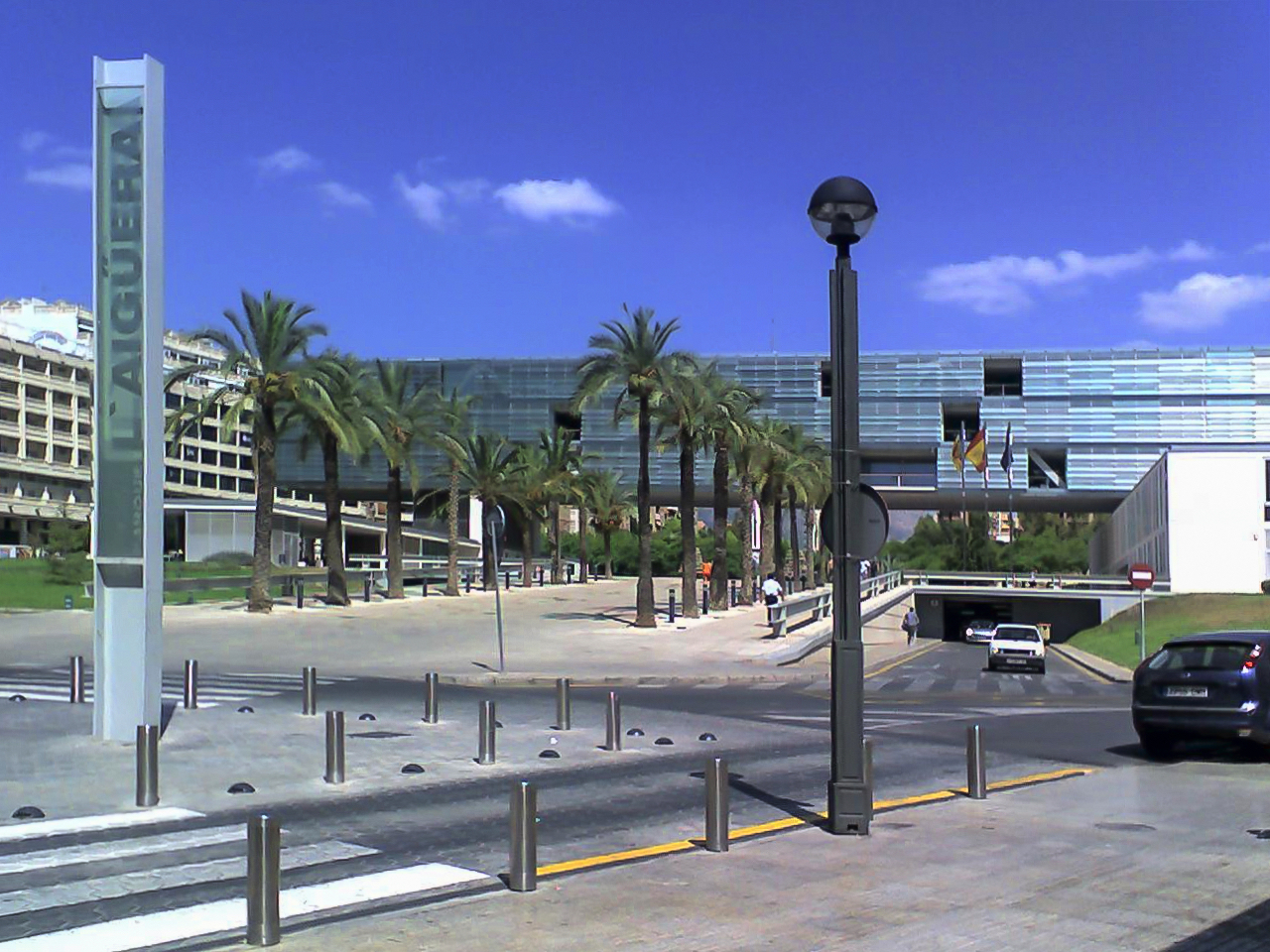
Benidorm Town Hall

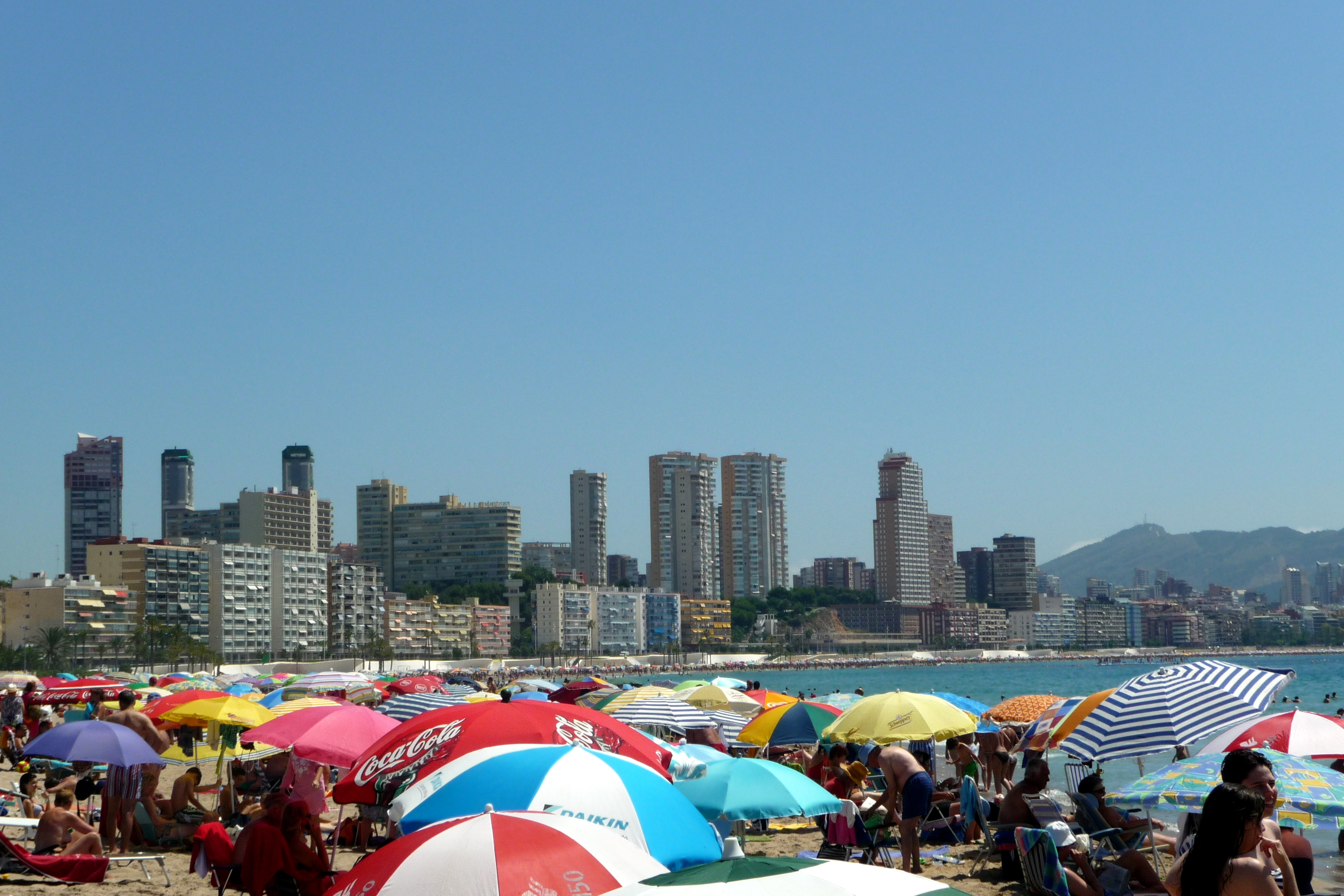
Skyline of Benidorm. Zaragoza is credited as the "father of modern Benidorm".

=== Early career ===
A lack of funds led Zaragoza to become a traveling salesman. He then became a porter at a rail station in Madrid. He soon became a miner of phosphate but advanced quickly to become manager of the mining company. He returned to Benidorm when his father died and became a bank manager at a branch there. He was soon promoted to a position in Madrid at the Spanish Confederation of Savings Banks, where he caught the attention of government officials.

=== Mayor of Benidorm ===
Zaragoza was appointed mayor in 1950 at the age of 28 by the Francoist State. At the time Benidorm was a small town without many economic prospects. Spain was still recovering from the Spanish Civil War that had ended in 1939. Zaragoza felt that the town could be turned into a beachside resort that would draw tourists not just from Spain, but from across Europe. In 1950, Benidorm only had 102 hotel rooms.

He became a one-man spokesman for his town by travelling across Europe to promote Benidorm. In Stockholm, Sweden, he left flowering almond branches in department stores. The Queen of the United Kingdom received local wine that he had sent. He planted orange trees in the name of famous people such as Queen Elizabeth and Charles de Gaulle, and sent the harvest to them.

Zaragoza rode a Vespa nine hours to advocate to Francisco Franco, caudillo of Spain, that the country should open to tourists. According to The Economist, "the dictator, amused by this small, round, moustachioed man with motor oil on his trousers, became a fan at once".

In 1952, Zaragoza allowed women to wear the newest fashion of bikinis anywhere in the town. This prompted some Catholic bishops to threaten to excommunicate him. Only on the intervention of Franco did the bishops and the Catholic Church back off from their threat.

Zaragoza encouraged the building of high-rises in Benidorm as he felt it helped more people to see the beaches and feel the sea air. In 2008, Benidorm was home to 330 skyscrapers and attracted over five million visitors.

=== Later career ===
In 1967, after stepping down as mayor, Zaragoza's high-energy personality continued into several positions over the years. As a provincial deputy, he voted against the restoration of the Spanish monarchy. He became president of the Province of Alicante. He was chair of the Tourism Commission for 12 years. He completed a law degree in the 1970s, specialising in urban development. At 82, he received a degree in tourism at Alicante University, which made him an honorary professor.

== Personal life ==
Zaragoza and his wife María Ivars had four children. Their marriage lasted 58 years.

Zaragoza died of heart failure on 1 April 2008. The town of Benidorm observed two days of official mourning for him.
