= Benidorm Island =

Islet and nature reserve of Spain

Coordinates: 38°30′08″N 0°07′49″W

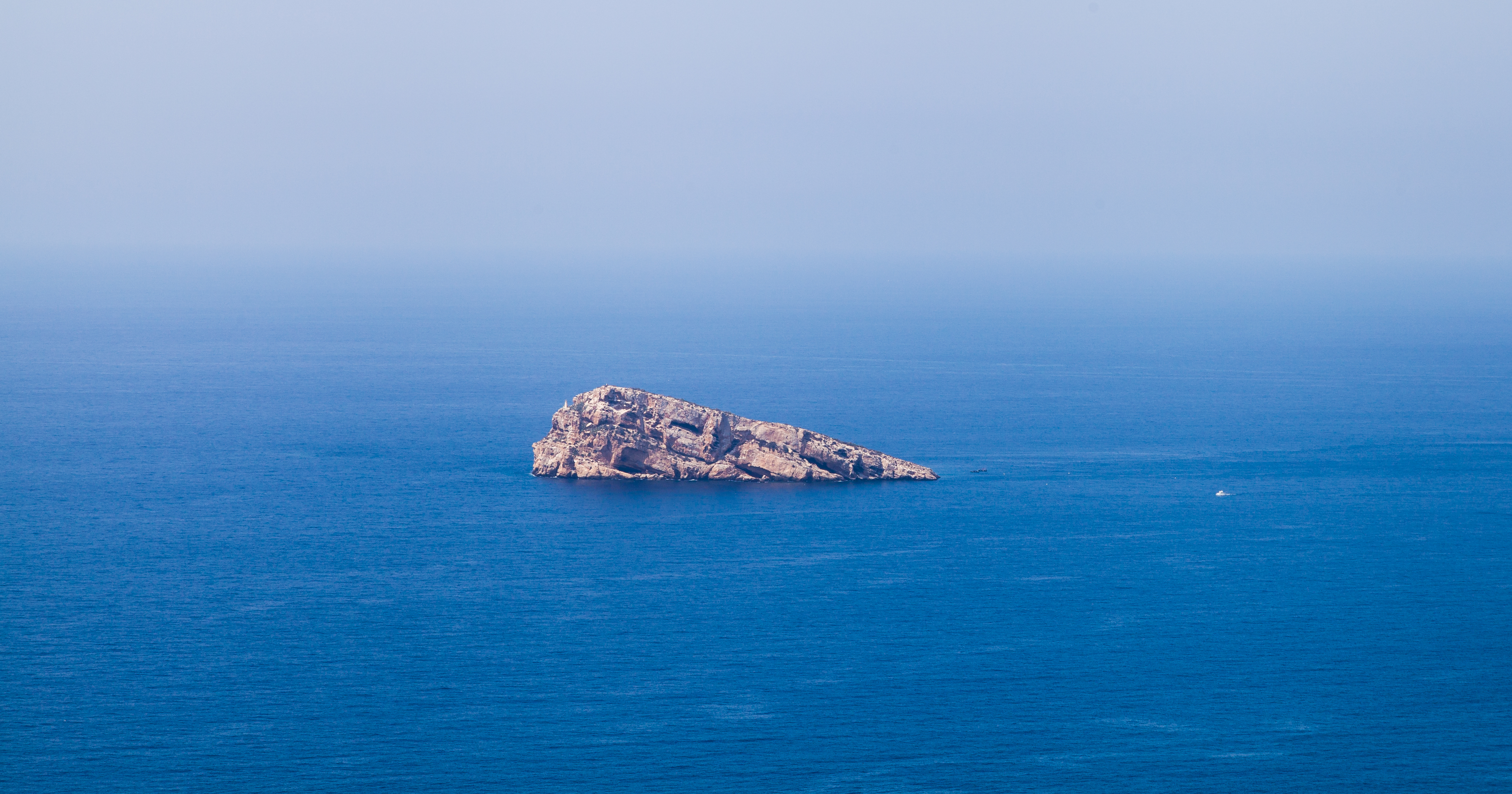
Benidorm Island

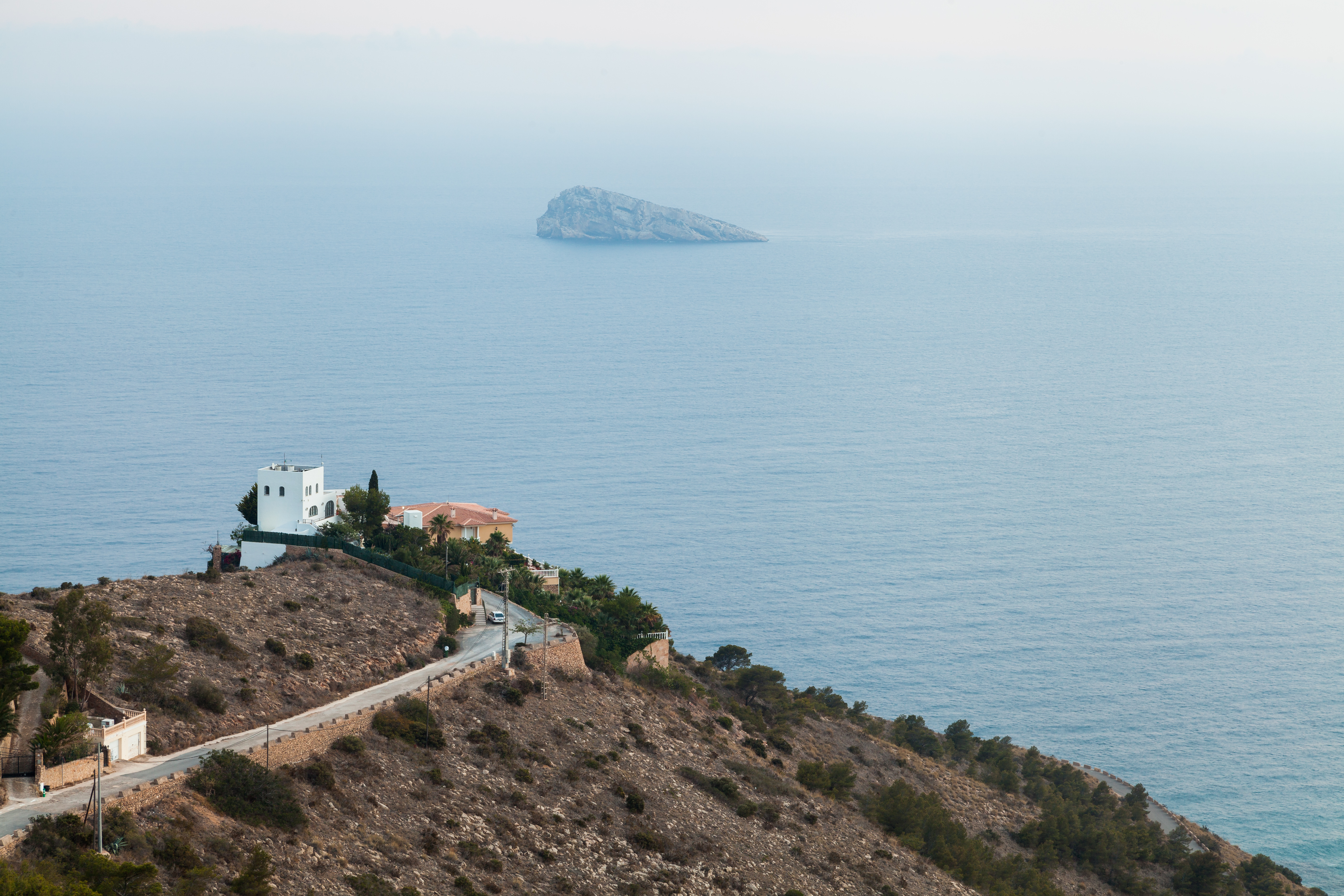
Island and coast of Benidorm

Benidorm Island (Valencian: Illa de Benidorm; Spanish: Isla de Benidorm) is a small island and nature reserve of Spain, off the Spanish Mediterranean coast. The island is near the holiday town of Benidorm, sitting approximately 3.5 kilometres (2.2 mi) from the Spanish mainland. Most days of the week, tourists can take boat trips from the mainland to visit the island.

Benidorm Island was once known as Peacock Island (Valencian: Illa dels Paons; Spanish: Isla de los Pavos Reales). However, the island is no longer populated by peacocks. There are many fables regarding the island itself and how it got there including how a giant kicked a rock out of the Puig Campana mountain in anger which then landed in the sea.
