= Benidorm (Belgian TV series) =

- DVD cover of the first episodes
- Created by: Eddy Asselberghs
- Written by: Eddy Asselberghs
- Starring: Jeanine Bisschops; Johnny Voners; Yvonne Verbeeck; Bob Van Staeyen; Jo Leemans; Max Schnur; Maria Bossers; Tony Bell; Peggy De Greef; René Wattez; Kikki Amity; Luc Van Puym; Eddy Asselbergs
- Opening theme: De Strangers
- Composer: De Strangers
- Country of origin: Belgium
- Original language: Dutch
- No. of seasons: 2
- No. of episodes: 26

Production
- Running time: 25 minutes

Original release
- Network: VTM
- Release: September 29, 1989

Benidorm is a Belgian comedy series developed and aired on the channel vtm between 1989 and 1992. 26 episodes were made. Most of the storylines are set in the Spanish town of Benidorm.

The series were written by Eddy Asselbergs. The first season is based upon Asselbergs theatre play "We gaan naar Benidorm" (We are heading to Benidorm). The second season is based upon on original script.

== Cast ==
- Janine Bischops: Angele
- Johny Voners: Gaston
- Max Schnur: Tuur
- Maria Bossers: Germaine
- Jo Leemans: Mariette
- Bob Van Staeyen: Theo
- Tony Bell: Karel
- Yvonne Verbeeck: Lisa
- Luc Van Puym: Pedro
- Peggy De Greef: Willemijn
- René Wattez: Kees
- Kikki Amity: shop owner (Season 1), Ansje (Season 2)
- Eddy Asselbergs: Pedro / Jesus
- Bert Champagne: Jean
- Bor: Snoetje
- Jacky Lafon: Carmen

== Story ==
Gaston and Angèle have been going on vacation to Blankenberge for several years. As they mostly have bad weather, Angèle decides they should go abroad and chooses Benidorm as their next location. Gaston does not want to go, but is forced. She asks their neighbours Tuur and Germaine to join but they refuse. Once there, it turns out their hotel is not yet finished. There is no electricity in the corridors, no elevator, no swimming pool, and the workers start at 6 AM. They make friends with their upper neighbours Theo and Mariette who bought their apartment.

Angèle decides to sunbathe but burns. Gaston makes the most of the bad situation and goes out with some Dutch women. Their boyfriends take revenge and Gaston is beaten. However, on the last day of their vacation, the incident is settled. Gaston announces he does love Benidorm, in contrast to Angèle, so he bought the apartment. Angèle is upset as they can't afford this.

Once home it turns out the cellar is under water. Tuur is asked to fix the problem. Angèle sneakily asks Tuur to install a sauna. Gaston and Tuur set up a swindle dealing in cheap wine. Their most important customer is Gaston's boss. When he finds out the truth he's actually surprised and even promotes Gaston as his personal driver. In meantime, Angèles mother went to Benidorm to arrange the problem with the apartment. She calls to tell Gaston that she bought the residence and even bought a second for herself. However, it turns out it is a timesharing contract.
