= Bernat de Sarrià =

Aragon nobleman, diplomat, and admiral

Bernat de Sarrià (or Bernard, c. 1260 – 30 July 1335), was nobleman, diplomat, and admiral of the Crown of Aragon.
