= List of number-one albums of 1988 (Spain) =

The List of number-one albums of 1988 in Spain is derived from the Top 100 España record chart published weekly by PROMUSICAE (Productores de Música de España), a non-profit organization composed by Spain and multinational record companies. This association tracks record sales (physical and digital) in Spain.

== Number-one albums ==
Week	Chart date	Album	Artist
1	January 4	Tempo D'Italia	Luis Cobos
2	January 11	Tempo D'Italia	Luis Cobos
3	January 18	Tempo D'Italia	Luis Cobos
4	January 25	El Grito del Tiempo	Duncan Dhu
5	February 1	El Grito del Tiempo	Duncan Dhu
6	February 8	Tempo D'Italia	Luis Cobos
7	February 15	Tempo D'Italia	Luis Cobos
8	February 22	Tempo D'Italia	Luis Cobos
9	February 29	Tempo D'Italia	Luis Cobos
10	March 7	El Grito del Tiempo	Duncan Dhu
11	March 14	Faith	George Michael
12	March 21	Tempo D'Italia	Luis Cobos
13	March 28	Whenever You Need Somebody	Rick Astley
14	April 4	Whenever You Need Somebody	Rick Astley
15	April 11	Whenever You Need Somebody	Rick Astley
16	April 18	Whenever You Need Somebody	Rick Astley
17	April 25	Whenever You Need Somebody	Rick Astley
18	May 2	Whenever You Need Somebody	Rick Astley
19	May 9	Whenever You Need Somebody	Rick Astley
20	May 16	Whenever You Need Somebody	Rick Astley
21	May 23	Whenever You Need Somebody	Rick Astley
22	May 30	Agitar antes de usar	Hombres G
23	June 6	Agitar antes de usar	Hombres G
24	June 13	Whenever You Need Somebody	Rick Astley
25	June 20	Agitar antes de usar	Hombres G
26	June 27	Agitar antes de usar	Hombres G
27	July 4	Descanso Dominical	Mecano
28	July 11	Descanso Dominical	Mecano
29	July 18	Descanso Dominical	Mecano
30	July 25	Descanso Dominical	Mecano
31	August 1	Descanso Dominical	Mecano
32	August 8	Descanso Dominical	Mecano
33	August 15	Descanso Dominical	Mecano
34	August 22	Descanso Dominical	Mecano
35	August 29	Descanso Dominical	Mecano
36	September 5	El Hombre del Traje Gris	Joaquín Sabina
37	September 12	El Hombre del Traje Gris	Joaquín Sabina
38	September 19	Descanso Dominical	Mecano
39	September 26	Descanso Dominical	Mecano
40	October 3	Descanso Dominical	Mecano
41	October 10	Rattle and Hum	U2
42	October 17	Rattle and Hum	U2
43	October 24	Rattle and Hum	U2
44	October 31	Rattle and Hum	U2
45	November 7	Rattle and Hum	U2
46	November 14	Rattle and Hum	U2
47	November 21	Money for Nothing	Dire Straits
48	November 28	Money for Nothing	Dire Straits
49	December 5	Vienna Concerto	Luis Cobos
50	December 12	Boom 4	Varios Artistas
51	December 19	Boom 4	Varios Artistas
52	December 26	Boom 4	Varios Artistas

== See also ==
- List of number-one singles of 1988 (Spain)
