= List of number-one albums of 1985 (Spain) =

The List of number-one albums of 1985 in Spain is derived from the Top 100 España record chart published weekly by PROMUSICAE (Productores de Música de España), a non-profit organization composed by Spain and multinational record companies. This association tracks record sales (physical and digital) in Spain.

== Albums ==
Week	Chart Date	Album	Artist
1	January 7	The Woman in Red	Stevie Wonder
2	January 14	En Directo	Joan Manuel Serrat
3	January 21	Deseo carnal	Alaska y Dinarama
4	January 28	Deseo carnal	Alaska y Dinarama
5	February 4	Deseo carnal	Alaska y Dinarama
6	February 11	Deseo carnal	Alaska y Dinarama
7	February 18	Deseo carnal	Alaska y Dinarama
8	February 25	Deseo carnal	Alaska y Dinarama
9	March 4	Deseo carnal	Alaska y Dinarama
10	March 11	Deseo carnal	Alaska y Dinarama
11	March 18	Deseo carnal	Alaska y Dinarama
12	March 25	Deseo carnal	Alaska y Dinarama
13	April 1	Deseo carnal	Alaska y Dinarama
14	April 8	Deseo carnal	Alaska y Dinarama
15	April 15	Deseo carnal	Alaska y Dinarama
16	April 22	Deseo carnal	Alaska y Dinarama
17	April 29	Deseo carnal	Alaska y Dinarama
18	May 6	Deseo carnal	Alaska y Dinarama
19	May 13	She's the Boss	Mick Jagger
20	May 20	No Jacket Required	Phil Collins
21	May 27	We Are the World	USA for Africa
22	June 3	We Are the World	USA for Africa
23	June 10	We Are the World	USA for Africa
24	June 17	Brothers in Arms	Dire Straits
25	June 24	Brothers in Arms	Dire Straits
26	July 1	Brothers in Arms	Dire Straits
27	July 8	Brothers in Arms	Dire Straits
28	July 15	Brothers in Arms	Dire Straits
29	July 22	Brothers in Arms	Dire Straits
30	July 29	Brothers in Arms	Dire Straits
31	August 5	Brothers in Arms	Dire Straits
32	August 12	Brothers in Arms	Dire Straits
33	August 19	Brothers in Arms	Dire Straits
34	August 26	Brothers in Arms	Dire Straits
35	September 2	Brothers in Arms	Dire Straits
36	September 9	Brothers in Arms	Dire Straits
37	September 16	Brothers in Arms	Dire Straits
38	September 23	Libra	Julio Iglesias
39	September 30	Brothers in Arms	Dire Straits
40	October 7	Like a Virgin	Madonna
41	October 14	Like a Virgin	Madonna
42	October 21	Like a Virgin	Madonna
43	October 28	In Square Circle	Stevie Wonder
44	November 4	In Square Circle	Stevie Wonder
45	November 11	In Square Circle	Stevie Wonder
46	November 18	In Square Circle	Stevie Wonder
47	November 25	In Square Circle	Stevie Wonder
48	December 2	In Square Circle	Stevie Wonder
49	December 9	Like a Virgin	Madonna
50	December 16	Like a Virgin	Madonna
51	December 23	Like a Virgin	Madonna
52	December 30	El Sur también existe	Joan Manuel Serrat

== See also ==
- List of number-one singles of 1985 (Spain)
