= List of number-one albums of 1980 (Spain) =

The List of number-one albums of 1980 in Spain is derived from the Top 100 España record chart published weekly by PROMUSICAE (Productores de Música de España), a non-profit organization composed by Spain and multinational record companies. This association tracks record sales (physical and digital) in Spain.

== Albums ==
No.	Artist	Album	Reached number one	Weeks at number one
1	Julio Iglesias	Hey!	23 June 1980	22
2	Pink Floyd	The Wall	25 February 1980	15
3	Pecos	Un par de corazones	14 January 1980	5
4	Miguel Bosé	Miguel	9 June 1980	2
5	Olivia Newton-John & Electric Light Orchestra	Xanadu	1 December 1980	2
6	The Police	Zenyatta Mondatta	15 December 1980	2
7	Bob Dylan	Slow Train Coming	18 February 1980	1
8	Village People	Can't Stop the Music	24 November 1980	1
9	Neil Diamond	20 Diamonds Hits	7 January 1980	1
10	Dúo Dinámico	20 éxitos de oro	29 December 1980	1

== See also ==
- List of number-one singles of 1980 (Spain)
