= List of number-one singles of 1980 (Spain) =

This is a list of the Spanish Singles number-ones of 1980.

== Chart history ==
Issue date	Song	Artist
7 January	"Sin Amor (Dschinghis Khan)"	Iván
14 January	"Háblame de Tí"	Pecos
21 January	"Háblame de Tí"	Pecos
28 January	"Háblame de Tí"	Pecos
4 February	"Man Gave Names to All the Animals"	Bob Dylan
11 February	"Man Gave Names to All the Animals"	Bob Dylan
18 February	"Man Gave Names to All the Animals"	Bob Dylan
25 February	"Man Gave Names to All the Animals"	Bob Dylan
3 March	"Video Killed the Radio Star"	The Buggles
10 March	"Video Killed the Radio Star"	The Buggles
17 March	"Video Killed the Radio Star"	The Buggles
24 March	"Video Killed the Radio Star"	The Buggles
31 March	"Rapper's Delight"	Sugarhill Gang
7 April	"Man Gave Names to All the Animals"	Bob Dylan
14 April	"Rapper's Delight"	Sugarhill Gang
21 April	"Rapper's Delight"	Sugarhill Gang
28 April	"Message in a Bottle"	The Police
5 May	"Rapper's Delight"	Sugarhill Gang
12 May	"Rapper's Delight"	Sugarhill Gang
19 May	"La Quiero a Morir"	Francis Cabrel
26 May	"La Quiero a Morir"	Francis Cabrel
2 June	"Morir de Amor"	Miguel Bosé
9 June	"Funkytown"	Lipps Inc.
16 June	"Rapper's Delight"	Sugarhill Gang
23 June	"Funkytown"	Lipps Inc.
30 June	"Funkytown"	Lipps Inc.
7 July	"Funkytown"	Lipps Inc.
14 July	"Funkytown"	Lipps Inc.
21 July	"Hey!"	Julio Iglesias
28 July	"Hey!"	Julio Iglesias
4 August	"Hey!"	Julio Iglesias
11 August	"Hey!"	Julio Iglesias
18 August	"Hey!"	Julio Iglesias
25 August	"Funkytown"	Lipps Inc.
1 September	"Funkytown"	Lipps Inc.
8 September	"Sun of Jamaica"	Goombay Dance Band
15 September	"Funkytown"	Lipps Inc.
22 September	"Sun of Jamaica"	Goombay Dance Band
29 September	"Sun of Jamaica"	Goombay Dance Band
6 October	"Sun of Jamaica"	Goombay Dance Band
13 October	"Don Diablo"	Miguel Bosé
20 October	"Xanadu"	Olivia Newton-John & Electric Light Orchestra
27 October	"Sun of Jamaica"	Goombay Dance Band
3 November	"Xanadu"	Olivia Newton-John & Electric Light Orchestra
10 November	"Xanadu"	Olivia Newton-John & Electric Light Orchestra
17 November	"Xanadu"	Olivia Newton-John & Electric Light Orchestra
24 November	"Xanadu"	Olivia Newton-John & Electric Light Orchestra
1 December	"Xanadu"	Olivia Newton-John & Electric Light Orchestra
8 December	"Woman in Love"	Barbra Streisand
15 December	"Woman in Love"	Barbra Streisand
22 December	"Woman in Love"	Barbra Streisand
29 December	"Woman in Love"	Barbra Streisand

== See also ==
- 1980 in music
- List of number-one hits (Spain)
- List of number-one singles of the 1980s in Spain
