= List of number-one singles of 1964 (Spain) =

This is a list of the Spanish Singles number-ones of 1964.

== Chart history ==
Issue date	Song	Artist
6 January	"Dile" (Tell Him)	Luis Aguilé
13 January	"Pregheró" (Stand by Me)	Adriano Celentano
20 January	"Cuore"	Rita Pavone
27 January	"Cuore"	Rita Pavone
3 February	"If I Had a Hammer"	Trini López
10 February	"If I Had a Hammer"	Trini López
17 February	"If I Had a Hammer"	Trini López
24 February	"If I Had a Hammer"	Trini López
2 March	"If I Had a Hammer"	Trini López
9 March	"If I Had a Hammer"	Trini López
18 March	"If I Had a Hammer"	Trini López
23 March	"If I Had a Hammer"	Trini López
30 March	"If I Had a Hammer"	Trini López
6 April	"If I Had a Hammer"	Trini López
13 April	"Non Ho L'Etá (Per Amarti)"	Gigliola Cinquetti
20 April	"Non Ho L'Etá (Per Amarti)"	Gigliola Cinquetti
27 April	"Non Ho L'Etá (Per Amarti)"	Gigliola Cinquetti
4 May	"Non Ho L'Etá (Per Amarti)"	Gigliola Cinquetti
11 May	"Non Ho L'Etá (Per Amarti)"	Gigliola Cinquetti
18 May	"La Mamma"	Charles Aznavour
25 May	"La Mamma"	Charles Aznavour
1 June	"La Mamma"	Charles Aznavour
8 June	"La Mamma"	Charles Aznavour
15 June	"La Mamma"	Charles Aznavour
22 June	"La Mamma"	Charles Aznavour
29 June	"La Mamma"	Charles Aznavour
6 July	"La Mamma"	Charles Aznavour
13 July	"Si Je Chante"	Sylvie Vartan
20 July	"Tú Serás Mi Baby" (Be My Baby)	Les Surfs
27 July	"Ciudad Solitaria"	Mina
3 August	"Ciudad Solitaria"	Mina
10 August	"Tú Serás Mi Baby" (Be My Baby)	Les Surfs
17 August	"Tú Serás Mi Baby" (Be My Baby)	Les Surfs
24 August	"Tú Serás Mi Baby" (Be My Baby)	Les Surfs
31 August	"Tú Serás Mi Baby" (Be My Baby)	Les Surfs
7 September	"Tú Serás Mi Baby" (Be My Baby)	Les Surfs
14 September	"Tú Serás Mi Baby" (Be My Baby)	Les Surfs
21 September	"Tú Serás Mi Baby" (Be My Baby)	Les Surfs
28 October	"Verde, Verde"	Luis Aguilé
5 October	"Tú Serás Mi Baby" (Be My Baby)	Les Surfs
12 October	"Tú No Tienes Corazón" (Anyone Who Had a Heart)	Petula Clark
19 October	"Tú No Tienes Corazón" (Anyone Who Had a Heart)	Petula Clark
26 October	"Ahora Te Puedes Marchar" (I Only Want to Be with You)	Les Surfs
2 November	"A Hard Day's Night"	The Beatles
9 November	"A Hard Day's Night"	The Beatles
16 November	"Ma vie"	Alain Barriere
23 November	"Ma vie"	Alain Barriere
30 November	"Ma vie"	Alain Barriere
7 December	"Ma vie"	Alain Barriere
14 December	"Ma vie"	Alain Barriere
21 December	"Ma vie"	Alain Barriere
28 December	"A Hard Day's Night"	The Beatles

== See also ==
- 1964 in music
- List of number-one hits (Spain)
