= List of number-one singles of 1981 (Spain) =

This is a list of the Spanish Singles number-ones of 1981.

== Chart history ==
Issue date	Song	Artist
5 January	"Woman in Love"	Barbra Streisand
12 January	"Woman in Love"	Barbra Streisand
19 January	"Woman in Love"	Barbra Streisand
26 January	"Perdóname"	Camilo Sesto
2 February	"(Just Like) Starting Over"	John Lennon
9 February	"(Just Like) Starting Over"	John Lennon
16 February	"What's In A Kiss"	Gilbert O'Sullivan
23 February	"What's In A Kiss"	Gilbert O'Sullivan
2 March	"What's In A Kiss"	Gilbert O'Sullivan
9 March	"What's In A Kiss"	Gilbert O'Sullivan
16 March	"Qué Será"	Ana Belén
23 March	"Another One Bites the Dust"	Queen
30 March	"Johnny and Mary"	Robert Palmer
6 April	"Johnny and Mary"	Robert Palmer
13 April	"Johnny and Mary"	Robert Palmer
20 April	"Johnny and Mary"	Robert Palmer
27 April	"Johnny and Mary"	Robert Palmer
4 May	"Everybody's Got to Learn Sometime"	The Korgis
11 May	"Everybody's Got to Learn Sometime"	The Korgis
18 May	"Everybody's Got to Learn Sometime"	The Korgis
25 May	"Te Quiero Tanto"	Iván
1 June	"Te Quiero"	José Luis Perales
8 June	"Te Quiero"	José Luis Perales
15 June	"Stars On 45"	Stars On 45
22 June	"Stars On 45"	Stars On 45
29 June	"Stars On 45"	Stars On 45
6 July	"Stars On 45"	Stars On 45
13 July	"Stars On 45"	Stars On 45
20 July	"Stars On 45"	Stars On 45
27 July	"Ay, Amor"	Víctor Manuel
3 August	"Ay, Amor"	Víctor Manuel
10 August	"Enola Gay"	Orchestral Manoeuvres in the Dark
17 August	"Enola Gay"	Orchestral Manoeuvres in the Dark
24 August	"De niña a Mujer"	Julio Iglesias
31 August	"De niña a Mujer"	Julio Iglesias
7 September	"Hands Up (Give Me Your Heart)"	Ottawan
14 September	"El Baile de los Pajaritos" (Chicken Dance)	María Jesús y su Acordeón
21 September	"Ma quale idea"	Pino D'Angiò
28 September	"Ma quale idea"	Pino D'Angiò
5 October	"Bette Davis Eyes"	Kim Carnes
12 October	"Ma Quale Idea"	Pino D'Angiò
19 October	"Ma Quale Idea"	Pino D'Angiò
26 October	"Ma Quale Idea"	Pino D'Angiò
2 November	"Ma Quale Idea"	Pino D'Angiò
9 November	"Ma Quale Idea"	Pino D'Angiò
16 November	"Ma Quale Idea"	Pino D'Angiò
23 November	"Ma Quale Idea"	Pino D'Angiò
30 November	"Ma Quale Idea"	Pino D'Angiò
7 December	"Ma Quale Idea"	Pino D'Angiò
14 December	"Ma Quale Idea"	Pino D'Angiò
21 December	"Ma Quale Idea"	Pino D'Angiò
28 December	"Ma Quale Idea"	Pino D'Angiò

== See also ==
- 1981 in music
- List of number-one hits (Spain)
- List of number-one singles of the 1980s in Spain
