= List of number-one singles of 1963 (Spain) =

Fifteen singles reached the Number One position in Spain in 1963. "Dame Felicidad" ("Give me Happiness") by Enrique Guzmán remained in the top spot for eight weeks between August and October, and "Tous les garçons et les filles" (Françoise Hardy) was top for a total of nine weeks over three different periods.

== Chart history ==
Issue date	Song	Artist
7 January	"Balada Gitana"	Dúo Dinámico
14 January	"Balada Gitana"	Dúo Dinámico
21 January	"Et Maintenant"	Gilbert Becaud
28 January	"Et Maintenant"	Gilbert Becaud
4 February	"Et Maintenant"	Gilbert Becaud
11 February	"Et Maintenant"	Gilbert Becaud
18 February	"Et Maintenant"	Gilbert Becaud
25 February	"Et Maintenant"	Gilbert Becaud
4 March	"J'Entends Siffler Le Train (500 Millas)"	Richard Anthony
11 March	"J'Entends Siffler Le Train (500 Millas)"	Richard Anthony
18 March	"J'Entends Siffler Le Train (500 Millas)"	Richard Anthony
25 March	"Return To Sender"	Elvis Presley
1 April	"María" (B.S.O. West Side Story)	Leonard Bernstein y Otros
8 April	"María" (B.S.O. West Side Story)	Leonard Bernstein y Otros
15 April	"María" (B.S.O. West Side Story)	Leonard Bernstein y Otros
22 April	"María" (B.S.O. West Side Story)	Leonard Bernstein y Otros
29 April	"Tous les garçons et les filles"	Françoise Hardy
6 May	"Tous les garçons et les filles"	Françoise Hardy
13 May	"Tous les garçons et les filles"	Françoise Hardy
20 May	"Tous les garçons et les filles"	Françoise Hardy
27 May	"La Plaga"	Los Teen Tops
3 June	"Chariot" (La Tierra)	Ennio Sangiusto
10 June	"Chariot" (La Tierra)	Ennio Sangiusto
17 June	"Chariot" (La Tierra)	Ennio Sangiusto
24 June	"Cien Kilos De Barro" (A Hundred Pounds of Clay)	Enrique Guzmán
1 July	"Tous les garçons et les filles"	Françoise Hardy
8 July	"Tous les garçons et les filles"	Françoise Hardy
15 July	"Tous les garçons et les filles"	Françoise Hardy
22 July	"Summer Holiday"	Cliff Richard & The Shadows
29 July	"Tous les garçons et les filles"	Françoise Hardy
5 August	"Tous les garçons et les filles"	Françoise Hardy
12 August	"Dame Felicidad"	Enrique Guzmán
19 August	"Dame Felicidad"	Enrique Guzmán
26 August	"Dame Felicidad"	Enrique Guzmán
2 September	"Dame Felicidad"	Enrique Guzmán
9 September	"Dame Felicidad"	Enrique Guzmán
16 September	"Dame Felicidad"	Enrique Guzmán
23 September	"Dame Felicidad"	Enrique Guzmán
30 October	"Dame Felicidad"	Enrique Guzmán
7 October	"Dame Felicidad"	Enrique Guzmán
14 October	"Et Ècoutant La Pluie" (Rhythm Of The Rain)	Sylvie Vartan
21 October	"Et Ècoutant La Pluie" (Rhythm Of The Rain)	Sylvie Vartan
28 October	"Amor De Verano"	Dúo Dinámico
4 November	"Amor De Verano"	Dúo Dinámico
11 November	"Amor De Verano"	Dúo Dinámico
18 November	"Amor De Verano"	Dúo Dinámico
27 November	"Amor De Verano"	Dúo Dinámico
2 December	"Dile" (Tell Him)	Luis Aguilé
9 December	"Dile" (Tell Him)	Luis Aguilé
16 December	"Dile" (Tell Him)	Luis Aguilé
23 December	"Dile" (Tell Him)	Luis Aguilé
30 December	"Dile" (Tell Him)	Luis Aguilé

== See also ==
- 1963 in music
- List of number-one hits (Spain)
