= List of number-one singles of 1987 (Spain) =

This is a list of the Spanish PROMUSICAE Top 20 Singles number-ones of 1987.

== Chart history ==
Issue date	Song	Artist
3 January	"Geronimo's Cadillac"	Modern Talking
10 January	"Geronimo's Cadillac"	Modern Talking
17 January	"Geronimo's Cadillac"	Modern Talking
24 January	"Geronimo's Cadillac"	Modern Talking
31 January	"The Final Countdown"	Europe
7 February	"The Final Countdown"	Europe
14 February	"The Final Countdown"	Europe
21 February	"The Final Countdown"	Europe
28 February	"The Final Countdown"	Europe
7 March	"The Final Countdown"	Europe
14 March	"The Final Countdown"	Europe
21 March	"The Final Countdown"	Europe
28 March	"The Final Countdown"	Europe
4 April	"The Final Countdown"	Europe
11 April	"Shake You Down"	Gregory Abbott
18 April	"Walk Like an Egyptian"	The Bangles
25 April	"Walk Like an Egyptian"	The Bangles
2 May	"Walk Like an Egyptian"	The Bangles
9 May	"Walk Like an Egyptian"	The Bangles
16 May	"Multimix"	The Communards
23 May	"Multimix"	The Communards
30 May	"Multimix"	The Communards
6 June	"Multimix"	The Communards
13 June	"Multimix"	The Communards
20 June	"Multimix"	The Communards
27 June	"Multimix"	The Communards
4 July	"Voyage, voyage"	Desireless
11 July	"Voyage, voyage"	Desireless
18 July	"Voyage, voyage"	Desireless
25 July	"Voyage, voyage"	Desireless
1 August	"Voyage, voyage"	Desireless
8 August	"Voyage, voyage"	Desireless
15 August	"Voyage, voyage"	Desireless
22 August	"Voyage, voyage"	Desireless
29 August	"Voyage, voyage"	Desireless
5 September	"Voyage, voyage"	Desireless
12 September	"Voyage, voyage"	Desireless
19 September	"Voyage, voyage"	Desireless
26 September	"Voyage, voyage"	Desireless
3 October	"It's a Sin"	Pet Shop Boys
10 October	"It's a Sin"	Pet Shop Boys
17 October	"It's a Sin"	Pet Shop Boys
24 October	"La Bamba"	Los Lobos
31 October	"La Bamba"	Los Lobos
7 November	"La Bamba"	Los Lobos
14 November	"La Bamba"	Los Lobos
21 November	"La Bamba"	Los Lobos
28 November	"Bad"	Michael Jackson
3 December	"Never Gonna Give You Up"	Rick Astley
10 December	"Never Gonna Give You Up"	Rick Astley
17 December	"Soul Survivor"	C. C. Catch
24 December	"Never Gonna Give You Up"	Rick Astley
31 December	"Never Gonna Give You Up"	Rick Astley

== See also ==
- 1987 in music
- List of number-one hits (Spain)
- List of number-one singles of the 1980s in Spain
