= List of number-one singles of 1968 (Spain) =

This is a list of the Spanish Singles number-ones of 1968.

== Chart history ==
Issue date	Song	Artist
1 January	"Cállate Niña"	Pic-Nic
8 January	"Cállate Niña"	Pic-Nic
15 January	"Cállate Niña"	Pic-Nic
22 January	"Cállate Niña"	Pic-Nic
29 January	"Cállate Niña"	Pic-Nic
5 February	"Cállate Niña"	Pic-Nic
12 February	"Cállate Niña"	Pic-Nic
19 February	"Hello, Goodbye"	The Beatles
26 February	"Cállate Niña"	Pic-Nic
4 March	"Cállate Niña"	Pic-Nic
11 March	"Pata Pata"	Miriam Makeba
18 March	"Soul Finger"	Bar-Kays
25 March	"I'm Coming Home"	Tom Jones
1 April	"I'm Coming Home"	Tom Jones
8 April	"I'm Coming Home"	Tom Jones
15 April	"I'm Coming Home"	Tom Jones
22 April	"La, la, la"	Massiel
29 April	"La, la, la"	Massiel
6 May	"La, la, la"	Massiel
13 May	"Congratulations"	Cliff Richard
20 May	"Congratulations"	Cliff Richard
27 May	"Congratulations"	Cliff Richard
3 June	"Congratulations"	Cliff Richard
10 June	"Delilah"	Tom Jones
17 June	"Delilah"	Tom Jones
24 June	"Delilah"	Tom Jones
1 July	"Delilah"	Tom Jones
8 July	"Delilah"	Tom Jones
15 July	"Delilah"	Tom Jones
22 July	"Delilah"	Tom Jones
29 July	"Delilah"	Tom Jones
5 August	"Delilah"	Tom Jones
12 August	"Delilah"	Tom Jones
19 August	"Delilah"	Tom Jones
26 August	"Delilah"	Tom Jones
2 September	"Delilah"	Tom Jones
9 September	"Delilah"	Tom Jones
16 September	"Delilah"	Tom Jones
23 September	"Delilah"	Tom Jones
30 September	"Get On Your Knees"	Los Canarios
7 October	"Get On Your Knees"	Los Canarios
14 October	"Get On Your Knees"	Los Canarios
21 October	"Get On Your Knees"	Los Canarios
28 October	"Get On Your Knees"	Los Canarios
4 November	"Oh Lord, Why Lord"	Pop-Tops
11 November	"Oh Lord, Why Lord"	Pop-Tops
18 November	"Hey Jude"	The Beatles
25 November	"Hey Jude"	The Beatles
2 December	"Hey Jude"	The Beatles
9 December	"Those Were The Days"	Mary Hopkin
16 December	"Those Were The Days"	Mary Hopkin
23 December	"Those Were The Days"	Mary Hopkin
30 December	"Those Were The Days"	Mary Hopkin

== See also ==
- 1968 in music
- List of number-one hits (Spain)
