= List of Spanish number-one hits of 1959 =

This is a list of the Spanish Singles number-ones of 1959.

== Chart history ==
Issue date	Song	Artist
5 January	"Las chicas De La Cruz Roja"	Ana María Parra
12 January	"Las chicas De La Cruz Roja"	Ana María Parra
19 January	"Las chicas De La Cruz Roja"	Ana María Parra
26 January	"Las chicas De La Cruz Roja"	Ana María Parra
2 February	"Como Antes" (Come Prima)	Los 5 Latinos
9 February	"Como Antes" (Come Prima)	Los 5 Latinos
16 February	"Mariquilla"	José Luís Y Su Guitarra
23 February	"Mariquilla"	José Luís Y Su Guitarra
2 March	"Mariquilla"	José Luís Y Su Guitarra
9 March	"Mariquilla"	José Luís Y Su Guitarra
16 March	"Mariquilla"	José Luís Y Su Guitarra
23 March	"Mariquilla"	José Luís Y Su Guitarra
30 March	"Mariquilla"	José Luís Y Su Guitarra
6 April	"Mariquilla"	José Luís Y Su Guitarra
13 April	"Mariquilla"	José Luís Y Su Guitarra
20 April	"Mariquilla"	José Luís Y Su Guitarra
27 April	"Mariquilla"	José Luís Y Su Guitarra
4 May	"Mariquilla"	José Luís Y Su Guitarra
11 May	"Diana"	Paul Anka
18 May	"Diana"	Paul Anka
25 May	"Diana"	Paul Anka
1 June	"Diana"	Paul Anka
8 June	"Diana"	Paul Anka
15 June	"Diana"	Paul Anka
22 June	"Diana"	Paul Anka
29 June	"Diana"	Paul Anka
6 July	"Diana"	Paul Anka
13 July	"Diana"	Paul Anka
20 July	"Recordándote"	Los 5 Latinos
27 July	"Recordándote"	Los 5 Latinos
3 August	"Recordándote"	Los 5 Latinos
10 August	"Un Telegrama"	Monna Bell
17 August	"Luna De Miel"	Gloria Lasso
24 August	"Luna De Miel"	Gloria Lasso
31 August	"Luna De Miel"	Gloria Lasso
7 September	"Un Telegrama"	Monna Bell
14 September	"Un Telegrama"	Monna Bell
21 September	"Un Telegrama"	Monna Bell
28 September	"You Are My Destiny"	Paul Anka
5 October	"You Are My Destiny"	Paul Anka
12 October	"La Montaña"	José Guardiola
19 October	"La Montaña"	José Guardiola
26 October	"You Are My Destiny"	Paul Anka
2 November	"You Are My Destiny"	Paul Anka
9 November	"You Are My Destiny"	Paul Anka
16 November	"You Are My Destiny"	Paul Anka
23 November	"Mare Nostrum (Ola, Ola, Ola)"	Elder Barber
30 November	"Mare Nostrum (Ola, Ola, Ola)"	Elder Barber
7 December	"Lonely Boy"	Paul Anka
14 December	"Lonely Boy"	Paul Anka
21 December	"Lonely Boy"	Paul Anka
28 December	"La Canción de Orfeo"	Gloria Lasso

== See also ==
- 1959 in music
- List of number-one hits (Spain)
