= List of number-one singles of 1966 (Spain) =

This is a list of the Spanish Singles number-ones of 1966.

== Chart history ==
Issue date	Song	Artist
3 January	"El Mundo"	Jimmy Fontana
10 January	"El Mundo"	Jimmy Fontana
17 January	"El Mundo"	Jimmy Fontana
24 January	"La Canción Del Tamborilero" (The Little Drummer Boy)	Raphael
31 January	"La Canción Del Tamborilero" (The Little Drummer Boy)	Raphael
7 February	"Capri c'est fini"	Hervé Vilard
14 February	"Capri c'est fini"	Hervé Vilard
21 February	"Yesterday"	The Beatles
28 February	"Capri c'est fini"	Hervé Vilard
7 March	"Aline"	Christophe
14 March	"(I Can't Get No) Satisfaction"	The Rolling Stones
21 March	"Yo soy aquél"	Raphael
28 March	"Yo soy aquél"	Raphael
4 April	"Yo soy aquél"	Raphael
11 April	"Yo soy aquél"	Raphael
18 April	"Yo soy aquél"	Raphael
25 April	"Mejor"	Los Brincos
2 May	"Yo soy aquél"	Raphael
9 May	"Yo soy aquél"	Raphael
16 May	"Yo soy aquél"	Raphael
23 May	"Yo soy aquél"	Raphael
30 May	"Yo soy aquél"	Raphael
6 June	"Michelle"	The Beatles
13 June	"Ninguno Me Puede Juzgar" (Nessuno Mi Puo Giudicare)	Caterina Caselli
20 June	"Ninguno Me Puede Juzgar" (Nessuno Mi Puo Giudicare)	Caterina Caselli
27 June	"These Boots Are Made For Walkin'"	Nancy Sinatra
4 July	"Juanita Banana"	Luis Aguilé
11 July	"Juanita Banana"	Luis Aguilé
18 July	"Juanita Banana"	Luis Aguilé
25 July	"Juanita Banana"	Luis Aguilé
1 August	"Juanita Banana"	Luis Aguilé
8 August	"Juanita Banana"	Luis Aguilé
15 August	"Juanita Banana"	Luis Aguilé
22 August	"Juanita Banana"	Luis Aguilé
29 August	"Un Sorbito De Champán"	Los Brincos
5 September	"Un Sorbito De Champán"	Los Brincos
12 September	"Juanita Banana"	Luis Aguilé
19 September	"Juanita Banana"	Luis Aguilé
26 October	"Juanita Banana"	Luis Aguilé
3 October	"Strangers in the Night"	Frank Sinatra
10 October	"La Banda Borracha"	Luis Aguilé
17 October	"Strangers in the Night"	Frank Sinatra
24 October	"Strangers in the Night"	Frank Sinatra
31 October	"Strangers in the Night"	Frank Sinatra
7 November	"Black Is Black"	Los Bravos
14 November	"Black Is Black"	Los Bravos
21 November	"Black Is Black"	Los Bravos
28 November	"Black Is Black"	Los Bravos
5 December	"Black Is Black"	Los Bravos
12 December	"Black Is Black"	Los Bravos
19 December	"Black Is Black"	Los Bravos
26 December	"Black Is Black"	Los Bravos

== See also ==
- 1966 in music
- List of number-one hits (Spain)
