= List of Spanish number-one hits of 1960 =

This is a list of the Spanish Singles number-one hits of 1960.

== Chart history ==
Issue date	Song	Artist
4 January	"Lonely Boy"	Paul Anka
11 January	"Lonely Boy"	Paul Anka
18 January	"Lonely Boy"	Paul Anka
25 January	"La Montaña"	Lucho Gatica
1 February	"La Montaña"	Lucho Gatica
8 February	"El Día De Los Enamorados"	Monna Bell
15 February	"El Día De Los Enamorados"	Monna Bell
22 February	"El Día De Los Enamorados"	Monna Bell
29 February	"Mackie El Navaja" (Mack The Knife)	José Guardiola
7 March	"Mackie El Navaja" (Mack The Knife)	José Guardiola
14 March	"Ansiedad"	Nat "King" Cole
21 March	"Ansiedad"	Nat "King" Cole
28 March	"Ansiedad"	Nat "King" Cole
4 April	"Ansiedad"	Nat "King" Cole
11 April	"Ansiedad"	Nat "King" Cole
18 April	"Ansiedad"	Nat "King" Cole
25 April	"Estremécete" (All Shook Up)	Los Llopis
2 May	"Estremécete" (All Shook Up)	Los Llopis
9 May	"Mustapha"	Bob Azzam
16 May	"Mustapha"	Bob Azzam
23 May	"Mustapha"	Bob Azzam
30 May	"16 Toneladas" (Sixteen Tons)	José Guardiola
6 June	"16 Toneladas" (Sixteen Tons)	José Guardiola
13 June	"Tom Pillibi"	Jacqueline Boyer
20 June	"Tom Pillibi"	Jacqueline Boyer
27 June	"Tom Pillibi"	Jacqueline Boyer
4 July	"Tom Pillibi"	Jacqueline Boyer
11 July	"Locamente Te Amaré"	Dalida
18 July	"Locamente Te Amaré"	Dalida
25 July	"Locamente Te Amaré"	Dalida
1 August	"Locamente Te Amaré"	Dalida
8 August	"Adam & Eve"	Paul Anka
15 August	"Adam & Eve"	Paul Anka
22 August	"Eres Diferente"	Los Cinco Latinos
29 August	"Eres Diferente"	Los Cinco Latinos
5 September	"Comunicando"	Arturo Millán
12 September	"Comunicando"	Arturo Millán
19 September	"Adam & Eve"	Paul Anka
26 September	"Adam & Eve"	Paul Anka
3 October	"Eres Diferente"	Los Cinco Latinos
10 October	"Eres Diferente"	Los Cinco Latinos
17 October	"It's Now Or Never"	Elvis Presley
24 October	"It's Now Or Never"	Elvis Presley
31 October	"It's Now Or Never"	Elvis Presley
7 November	"It's Now Or Never"	Elvis Presley
14 November	"It's Now Or Never"	Elvis Presley
21 November	"It's Now Or Never"	Elvis Presley
28 November	"Diavolo"	Jimmy Fontana
5 December	"Xipna Aghapi Mou"	Nana Mouskouri
12 December	"It's Now Or Never"	Elvis Presley
19 December	"It's Now Or Never"	Elvis Presley
26 December	"Greenfields"	The Brothers Four

== See also ==
- 1960 in music
- List of number-one hits (Spain)
