= List of number-one singles of 1986 (Spain) =

This is a list of the Spanish Singles number-ones of 1986.

== Chart history ==
Issue date	Song	Artist
6 January	"Part-Time Lover"	Stevie Wonder
13 January	"Cheri, Cheri Lady"	Modern Talking
20 January	"Part-Time Lover"	Stevie Wonder
27 January	"Part-Time Lover"	Stevie Wonder
3 February	"p:Machinery"	Propaganda
10 February	"Janey, Don't You Lose Heart"	Bruce Springsteen
17 February	"Janey, Don't You Lose Heart"	Bruce Springsteen
24 February	"Say You, Say Me"	Lionel Richie
3 March	"Say You, Say Me"	Lionel Richie
10 March	"Say You, Say Me"	Lionel Richie
17 March	"Say You, Say Me"	Lionel Richie
24 March	"Say You, Say Me"	Lionel Richie
31 March	"Say You, Say Me"	Lionel Richie
7 April	"Si Tú Eres Mi Hombre y Yo Tu Mujer"(The Power of Love)	Jennifer Rush
14 April	"Si Tú Eres Mi Hombre y Yo Tu Mujer"(The Power of Love)	Jennifer Rush
21 April	"Si Tú Eres Mi Hombre y Yo Tu Mujer"(The Power of Love)	Jennifer Rush
28 April	"Si Tú Eres Mi Hombre y Yo Tu Mujer"(The Power of Love)	Jennifer Rush
5 May	"Si Tú Eres Mi Hombre y Yo Tu Mujer"(The Power of Love)	Jennifer Rush
12 May	"Si Tú Eres Mi Hombre y Yo Tu Mujer"(The Power of Love)	Jennifer Rush
19 May	"Love Missile F1-11"	Sigue Sigue Sputnik
26 May	"Love Missile F1-11"	Sigue Sigue Sputnik
2 June	"Love Missile F1-11"	Sigue Sigue Sputnik
9 June	"Brother Louie"	Modern Talking
16 June	"Brother Louie"	Modern Talking
23 June	"Brother Louie"	Modern Talking
30 June	"Conga"	Miami Sound Machine
7 July	"Irresistible"	Stéphanie
14 July	"La Puerta de Alcalá"	Víctor Manuel y Ana Belén
21 July	"La Puerta de Alcalá"	Víctor Manuel y Ana Belén
28 July	"La Puerta de Alcalá"	Víctor Manuel y Ana Belén
4 August	"La Puerta de Alcalá"	Víctor Manuel y Ana Belén
11 August	"La Puerta de Alcalá"	Víctor Manuel y Ana Belén
18 August	"Rock Me Amadeus"	Falco
25 August	"La Puerta de Alcalá"	Víctor Manuel y Ana Belén
1 September	"La Puerta de Alcalá"	Víctor Manuel y Ana Belén
8 September	"Right Between the Eyes"	Wax
15 September	"Easy Lady"	Spagna
22 September	"Easy Lady"	Spagna
29 September	"Easy Lady"	Spagna
6 October	"Easy Lady"	Spagna
13 October	"Easy Lady"	Spagna
20 October	"Easy Lady"	Spagna
27 October	"Easy Lady"	Spagna
3 November	"Holiday Rap"	MC Miker G & DJ Sven
10 November	"Typical Male"	Tina Turner
17 November	"¿A Quién le Importa?"	Alaska y Dinarama
24 November	"¿A Quién le Importa?"	Alaska y Dinarama
1 December	"¿A Quién le Importa?"	Alaska y Dinarama
8 December	"Lessons in Love"	Level 42
15 December	"Geronimo's Cadillac"	Modern Talking
22 December	"Geronimo's Cadillac"	Modern Talking
29 December	"Don't Leave Me This Way"	The Communards

== See also ==
- 1986 in music
- List of number-one hits (Spain)
- List of number-one singles of the 1980s in Spain
