= List of number-one singles of 1982 (Spain) =

This is a list of the Spanish Singles number-ones of 1982.

== Chart history ==
| Issue date | Song | Artist |
|---|---|---|
| 4 January | "Será Porque Te Amo" (Sarà perché ti amo) | Ricchi e Poveri |
| 11 January | "Hold on Tight" | Electric Light Orchestra |
| 18 January | "Juntos" | Paloma San Basilio |
| 25 January | "Juntos" | Paloma San Basilio |
| 1 February | "Juntos" | Paloma San Basilio |
| 8 February | "(Out Here) On My Own" | Nikka Costa |
| 15 February | "(Out Here) On My Own" | Nikka Costa |
| 22 February | "(Out Here) On My Own" | Nikka Costa |
| 1 March | "(Out Here) On My Own" | Nikka Costa |
| 8 March | "(Out Here) On My Own" | Nikka Costa |
| 15 March | "(Out Here) On My Own" | Nikka Costa |
| 22 March | "(Out Here) On My Own" | Nikka Costa |
| 29 March | "(Out Here) On My Own" | Nikka Costa |
| 5 April | "(Out Here) On My Own" | Nikka Costa |
| 12 April | "Souvenir" | Orchestral Manoeuvres in the Dark |
| 19 April | "Souvenir" | Orchestral Manoeuvres in the Dark |
| 26 April | "Sharazan" | Al Bano and Romina Power |
| 3 May | "Souvenir" | Orchestral Manoeuvres in the Dark |
| 10 May | "Souvenir" | Orchestral Manoeuvres in the Dark |
| 17 May | "Souvenir" | Orchestral Manoeuvres in the Dark |
| 24 May | "Me Colé en una Fiesta" | Mecano |
| 31 May | "Me Colé en una Fiesta" | Mecano |
| 7 June | "Me Colé en una Fiesta" | Mecano |
| 14 June | "Me Colé en una Fiesta" | Mecano |
| 21 June | "Me Colé en una Fiesta" | Mecano |
| 28 June | "Ebony and Ivory" | Paul McCartney and Stevie Wonder |
| 5 July | "Ebony and Ivory" | Paul McCartney and Stevie Wonder |
| 12 July | "Me Colé en una Fiesta" | Mecano |
| 19 July | "Me Colé en una Fiesta" | Mecano |
| 26 July | "Bailando" | Alaska y Los Pegamoides |
| 2 August | "Joan of Arc (Maid of Orleans)" | Orchestral Manoeuvres in the Dark |
| 9 August | "Joan of Arc (Maid of Orleans)" | Orchestral Manoeuvres in the Dark |
| 16 August | "Eye in the Sky" | The Alan Parsons Project |
| 23 August | "Eye in the Sky" | The Alan Parsons Project |
| 30 August | "Eye in the Sky" | The Alan Parsons Project |
| 6 September | "Eye in the Sky" | The Alan Parsons Project |
| 13 September | "Just an Illusion" | Imagination |
| 20 September | "Just an Illusion" | Imagination |
| 27 September | "Just an Illusion" | Imagination |
| 4 October | "Just an Illusion" | Imagination |
| 11 October | "Just an Illusion" | Imagination |
| 18 October | "No Sucederá Más" | Claudia Mori |
| 25 October | "Babe, We're Gonna Love Tonite" | Lime |
| 1 November | "No Sucederá Más" | Claudia Mori |
| 8 November | "Can't Take My Eyes Off You" | Boys Town Gang |
| 15 November | "No Me Vuelvo a Enamorar" (I Won't Fall In Love Again) | Julio Iglesias |
| 22 November | "Abracadabra" | The Steve Miller Band |
| 29 November | "Amor de Hombre" | Mocedades |
| 6 December | "Amor de Hombre" | Mocedades |
| 13 December | "Amor de Hombre" | Mocedades |
| 20 December | "Amor de Hombre" | Mocedades |
| 27 December | "Words" | F.R. David |

== See also ==
- 1982 in music
- List of number-one hits (Spain)
- List of number-one singles of the 1980s in Spain
