= List of number-one singles of 2007 (Spain) =

This is a list of the Spanish PROMUSICAE Top 20 Singles number-ones of 2007.

Issue date	Song	Artist
7 January	"Al final de la palmera"	Rafa González-Serna
14 January	"Al final de la palmera"	Rafa González-Serna
21 January	"Al final de la palmera"	Rafa González-Serna
28 January	"Al final de la palmera"	Rafa González-Serna
4 February	"Al final de la palmera"	Rafa González-Serna
11 February	"Al final de la palmera"	Rafa González-Serna
18 February	"Ni contigo ni sin ti"	Fangoria
25 February	"Ni contigo ni sin ti"	Fangoria
4 March	"Colillas en el suelo"	Deluxe
11 March	"Different World"	Iron Maiden
18 March	"Al final de la palmera"	Rafa González-Serna
25 March	"Alegrías del incendio"	Los Planetas
1 April	"Alegrías del incendio"	Los Planetas
8 April	"Alegrías del incendio"	Los Planetas
15 April	"Alegrías del incendio"	Los Planetas
22 April	"Al final de la palmera"	Rafa González-Serna
29 April	"The Moment You Believe"	Melanie C
6 May	"The Moment You Believe"	Melanie C
13 May	"Micromania"	Tata Golosa
20 May	"Dejándonos llevar"	Chloe
27 May	"Dejándonos llevar"	Chloe
3 June	"Los raperos nunca mueren"	Shotta
10 June	"Los raperos nunca mueren"	Shotta
17 June	"Los raperos nunca mueren"	Shotta
24 June	"Los raperos nunca mueren"	Shotta
1 July	"Miss Sanchez Remixes"	Marta Sánchez
8 July	"Miss Sanchez Remixes"	Marta Sánchez
15 July	"Miss Sanchez Remixes"	Marta Sánchez
22 July	"El cementerio de mis sueños"	Fangoria
29 July	"The Show Must Go On"	Innocence
5 August	"The Show Must Go On"	Innocence
12 August	"Remixes"	Xtreme
19 August	"The Show Must Go On"	Innocence
26 August	"El cementerio de mis sueños"	Fangoria
2 September	"Amaranth"	Nightwish
9 September	"Amaranth"	Nightwish
16 September	"Amaranth"	Nightwish
23 September	"The Show Must Go On"	Innocence
30 September	"Mi gorra es mi corona"	Spanish Fly
7 October	"The Show Must Go On"	Innocence
14 October	"Kingdom"	Dave Gahan
21 October	"Y ahora voy a salir (Ranxeira)"	Mägo de Oz
28 October	"Kingdom"	Dave Gahan
4 November	"Y ahora voy a salir (Ranxeira)"	Mägo de Oz
11 November	"Y ahora voy a salir (Ranxeira)"	Mägo de Oz
18 November	"2 Hearts"	Kylie Minogue
25 November	"Que poco arte"	Sylvia Pantoja
30 November	"2 Hearts"	Kylie Minogue
9 December	"2 Hearts"	Kylie Minogue
16 December	"The Singles Boxset"	The Who
23 December	"The Singles Boxset"	The Who
30 December	"Himno oficial del centenario"	El Arrebato

== See also ==
- 2007 in music
- List of number-one hits in Spain
