= List of number-one singles of 1994 (Spain) =

This is a list of the Spanish PROMUSICAE Top 20 Singles number-ones of 1994.

== Chart history ==
Issue date	Song	Artist
1 January	"Saturday Night"	Whigfield
8 January	"Saturday Night"	Whigfield
15 January	"Saturday Night"	Whigfield
22 January	"Saturday Night"	Whigfield
29 January	"Saturday Night"	Whigfield
5 February	"Saturday Night"	Whigfield
12 February	"Saturday Night"	Whigfield
19 February	"Right in the Night"	Jam & Spoon featuring Plavka
26 February	"Right in the Night"	Jam & Spoon featuring Plavka
5 March	"Right in the Night"	Jam & Spoon featuring Plavka
12 March	"Right in the Night"	Jam & Spoon featuring Plavka
19 March	"The Sign"	Ace of Base
26 March	"Right in the Night"	Jam & Spoon
2 April	"Dimension Divertida"	Paco Pil
9 April	"Dimension Divertida"	Paco Pil
16 April	"Dimension Divertida"	Paco Pil
23 April	"Sister Golden Hair"	Spanić
30 April	"Sister Golden Hair"	Spanić
7 May	"Sister Golden Hair"	Spanić
14 May	"Hooked on a Feeling"	Tony Wilson
21 May	"Hooked on a Feeling"	Tony Wilson
28 May	"Hooked on a Feeling"	Tony Wilson
4 June	"Hooked on a Feeling"	Tony Wilson
11 June	"The Most Beautiful Girl in the World"	Prince
18 June	"Baby, I Love Your Way"	Big Mountain
25 June	"Baby, I Love Your Way"	Big Mountain
2 July	"Baby, I Love Your Way"	Big Mountain
9 July	"Baby, I Love Your Way"	Big Mountain
16 July	"Baby, I Love Your Way"	Big Mountain
23 July	"Dame Mas"	Alex de la Nuez
30 July	"Baby, I Love Your Way"	Big Mountain
6 August	"Baby, I Love Your Way"	Big Mountain
13 August	"Baby, I Love Your Way"	Big Mountain
20 August	"Johnny Techno Ska"	Paco Pil
27 August	"Johnny Techno Ska"	Paco Pil
3 September	"Johnny Techno Ska"	Paco Pil
10 September	"Johnny Techno Ska"	Paco Pil
17 September	"Don't Stop (Wiggle Wiggle)"	The Outhere Brothers
24 September	"Don't Stop (Wiggle Wiggle)"	The Outhere Brothers
1 October	"Don't Stop (Wiggle Wiggle)"	The Outhere Brothers
8 October	"Don't Stop (Wiggle Wiggle)"	The Outhere Brothers
15 October	"Don't Stop (Wiggle Wiggle)"	The Outhere Brothers
22 October	"Let the Beat Go On"	Dr. Alban
29 October	"Hymn"	Caballero
5 November	"Hymn"	Caballero
12 November	"Hypnose"	Scorpia
19 November	"Hymn"	Caballero
26 November	"Hymn"	Caballero
3 December	"Hypnose"	Scorpia
10 December	"Hypnose"	Scorpia
17 December	"Hypnose"	Scorpia
24 December	"Hyper Hyper"	Scooter
31 December	"Kaña de España"	J. Rapallo

== See also ==
- 1994 in music
- List of number-one hits (Spain)
