= List of number-one singles of 1972 (Spain) =

This is a list of the Spanish Singles number-ones of 1972.

== Chart history ==
Issue date	Song	Artist
3 January	"Mammy Blue"	Pop-Tops
10 January	"Soy rebelde"	Jeanette
17 January	"Soy rebelde"	Jeanette
24 January	"Soy rebelde"	Jeanette
31 January	"Soy rebelde"	Jeanette
7 February	"Soy rebelde"	Jeanette
14 February	"Soy rebelde"	Jeanette
21 February	"Soy rebelde"	Jeanette
28 February	"Soy rebelde"	Jeanette
6 March	"Soy rebelde"	Jeanette
13 March	"Soy rebelde"	Jeanette
20 March	"The Witch Queen of New Orleans"	Redbone
27 March	"El Chico de la Armónica"	Micky
3 April	"The Witch Queen of New Orleans"	Redbone
10 April	"Yo No Soy Esa"	Mari Trini
17 April	"Yo No Soy Esa"	Mari Trini
24 April	"Yo No Soy Esa"	Mari Trini
1 May	"Yo No Soy Esa"	Mari Trini
8 May	"Yo No Soy Esa"	Mari Trini
15 May	"Yo No Soy Esa"	Mari Trini
22 May	"Son of My Father"	Chicory Tip
29 May	"Give Ireland Back to the Irish"	Paul McCartney
5 June	"(Is This the Way to) Amarillo"	Tony Christie
12 June	"(Is This the Way to) Amarillo"	Tony Christie
19 June	"Son of My Father"	Chicory Tip
26 June	"Son of My Father"	Chicory Tip
3 July	"Son of My Father"	Chicory Tip
10 July	"Algo de Mi"	Camilo Sesto
17 July	"Algo de Mi"	Camilo Sesto
24 July	"Algo de Mi"	Camilo Sesto
31 July	"Algo de Mi"	Camilo Sesto
7 August	"Algo de Mi"	Camilo Sesto
14 August	"Algo de Mi"	Camilo Sesto
21 August	"Algo de Mi"	Camilo Sesto
28 August	"Algo de Mi"	Camilo Sesto
4 September	"Algo de Mi"	Camilo Sesto
11 September	"Algo de Mi"	Camilo Sesto
18 September	"Algo de Mi"	Camilo Sesto
25 September	"Oh Oh July"	Los Diablos
2 October	"Algo De Mi"	Camilo Sesto
9 October	"Popcorn"	The Popcorn Makers
16 October	"Algo De Mi"	Camilo Sesto
23 October	"Speak Softly Love"	Andy Williams
30 October	"Speak Softly Love"	Andy Williams
6 November	"Speak Softly Love"	Andy Williams
13 November	"Speak Softly Love"	Andy Williams
20 November	"Speak Softly Love"	Andy Williams
27 November	"Speak Softly Love"	Andy Williams
4 December	"Speak Softly Love"	Andy Williams
11 December	"Speak Softly Love"	Andy Williams
18 December	"Speak Softly Love"	Andy Williams
25 December	"Speak Softly Love"	Andy Williams

== See also ==
- 1972 in music
- List of number-one hits (Spain)
