= List of number-one hits (Spain) =

This is a list of number-one hits in Spain by year from the chart compiled weekly by PROMUSICAE.

== 1950s ==
1959

== 1960s ==
1960 1961 1962 1963 1964 1965 1966 1967 1968 1969

== 1970s ==
1970 1971 1972 1973 1974 1975 1976 1977 1978 1979

== 1980s ==
1980 1981 1982 1983 1984 1985 1986 1987 1988 1989

== 1990s ==
1990 1991 1992 1993 1994 1995 1996 1997 1998 1999

== 2000s ==
2000 2001 2002 2003 2004 2005 2006 2007 2008 2009

== 2010s ==
2010 2011 2012 2013 2014 2015 2016 2017 2018 2019

== 2020s ==
2020 2021 2022 2023 2024 2025 2026
