= List of number-one singles of 1991 (Spain) =

This is a list of the Spanish PROMUSICAE Top 20 Singles number-ones of 1991.

== Chart history ==
Issue date	Song	Artist
5 January	"I've Been Thinking About You"	Londonbeat
12 January	"I've Been Thinking About You"	Londonbeat
19 January	"I've Been Thinking About You"	Londonbeat
26 January	"Sadness (Part 1)"	Enigma
2 February	"Sadness (Part 1)"	Enigma
9 February	"Sadness (Part 1)"	Enigma
16 February	"Sadness (Part 1)"	Enigma
23 February	"Sadness (Part 1)"	Enigma
2 March	"Sadness (Part 1)"	Enigma
9 March	"Sadness (Part 1)"	Enigma
16 March	"The Grease Megamix"	John Travolta and Olivia Newton-John
23 March	"The Grease Megamix"	John Travolta and Olivia Newton-John
30 March	"The Grease Megamix"	John Travolta and Olivia Newton-John
6 April	"The Grease Megamix"	John Travolta and Olivia Newton-John
13 April	"The Grease Megamix"	John Travolta and Olivia Newton-John
20 April	"The Grease Megamix"	John Travolta and Olivia Newton-John
27 April	"The Grease Megamix"	John Travolta and Olivia Newton-John
4 May	"The Grease Megamix"	John Travolta and Olivia Newton-John
11 May	"The Grease Megamix"	John Travolta and Olivia Newton-John
18 May	"The Grease Megamix"	John Travolta and Olivia Newton-John
25 May	"The Grease Megamix"	John Travolta and Olivia Newton-John
1 June	"The Grease Megamix"	John Travolta and Olivia Newton-John
8 June	"El 7 de Septiembre"	Mecano
15 June	"El 7 de Septiembre"	Mecano
22 June	"El 7 de Septiembre"	Mecano
29 June	"Gypsy Woman (She's Homeless)"	Crystal Waters
6 July	"Gypsy Woman (She's Homeless)"	Crystal Waters
13 July	"Aquest Any Si"	Varios
20 July	"Gypsy Woman (She's Homeless)"	Crystal Waters
27 July	"Gypsy Woman (She's Homeless)"	Crystal Waters
3 August	"Gypsy Woman (She's Homeless)"	Crystal Waters
10 August	"Gypsy Woman (She's Homeless)"	Crystal Waters
17 August	"Gypsy Woman (She's Homeless)"	Crystal Waters
24 August	"You Could Be Mine"	Guns N' Roses
31 August	"You Could Be Mine"	Guns N' Roses
7 September	"You Could Be Mine"	Guns N' Roses
14 September	"You Could Be Mine"	Guns N' Roses
21 September	"Asi Me Gusta"	Chimo Bayo
28 September	"Asi Me Gusta"	Chimo Bayo
5 October	"Asi Me Gusta"	Chimo Bayo
12 October	"Asi Me Gusta"	Chimo Bayo
19 October	"Asi Me Gusta"	Chimo Bayo
26 October	"Asi Me Gusta"	Chimo Bayo
2 November	"Asi Me Gusta"	Chimo Bayo
9 November	"The Fly"	U2
16 November	"Black or White"	Michael Jackson
23 November	"Black or White"	Michael Jackson
30 November	"Black or White"	Michael Jackson
7 December	"Black or White"	Michael Jackson
14 December	"Black or White"	Michael Jackson
21 December	"Black or White"	Michael Jackson
28 December	"Black or White"	Michael Jackson

== See also ==
- 1991 in music
- List of number-one hits (Spain)
