= List of number-one singles of 1969 (Spain) =

This is a list of the Spanish Singles number-ones of 1969.

== Chart history ==
| Issue date | Song | Artist |
|---|---|---|
| 6 January | "Those Were The Days" | Mary Hopkin |
| 13 January | "Those Were The Days" | Mary Hopkin |
| 20 January | "Eloise" | Barry Ryan |
| 27 January | "Eloise" | Barry Ryan |
| 3 February | "Eloise" | Barry Ryan |
| 10 February | "Eloise" | Barry Ryan |
| 17 February | "Eloise" | Barry Ryan |
| 24 February | "Eloise" | Barry Ryan |
| 3 March | "Eloise" | Barry Ryan |
| 10 March | "Eloise" | Barry Ryan |
| 17 March | "Las Flechas Del Amor" (Little Arrows) | Karina |
| 24 March | "Las Flechas Del Amor" (Little Arrows) | Karina |
| 31 March | "Las Flechas Del Amor" (Little Arrows) | Karina |
| 7 April | "Las Flechas Del Amor" (Little Arrows) | Karina |
| 14 April | "Las Flechas Del Amor" (Little Arrows) | Karina |
| 21 April | "Las Flechas Del Amor" (Little Arrows) | Karina |
| 28 April | "Casatschock" | Georgie Dann |
| 5 May | "Casatschock" | Georgie Dann |
| 12 May | "Mama" | Jean Jacques |
| 19 May | "Cuéntame" | Fórmula V |
| 26 May | "Mama" | Jean Jacques |
| 2 June | "Mama" | Jean Jacques |
| 9 June | "Mama" | Jean Jacques |
| 16 June | "Mama" | Jean Jacques |
| 23 June | "Get Back" | The Beatles |
| 30 June | "Mama" | Jean Jacques |
| 7 July | "Get Back" | The Beatles |
| 14 July | "O quizá Simplemente Le Regale Una Rosa" | Henry Stephen |
| 21 July | "María Isabel" | Los Payos |
| 28 July | "María Isabel" | Los Payos |
| 4 August | "María Isabel" | Los Payos |
| 11 August | "María Isabel" | Los Payos |
| 18 August | "María Isabel" | Los Payos |
| 25 August | "The Ballad of John and Yoko" | The Beatles |
| 1 September | "The Ballad of John and Yoko" | The Beatles |
| 8 September | "María Isabel" | Los Payos |
| 15 September | "María Isabel" | Los Payos |
| 22 September | "María Isabel" | Los Payos |
| 29 September | "María Isabel" | Los Payos |
| 6 October | "In the Ghetto" | Elvis Presley |
| 13 October | "In the Ghetto" | Elvis Presley |
| 20 October | "In the Ghetto" | Elvis Presley |
| 27 October | "La Charanga" | Juan Pardo |
| 3 November | "In the Year 2525" | Zager & Evans |
| 10 November | "In the Year 2525" | Zager & Evans |
| 17 November | "Sugar, Sugar" | The Archies |
| 24 November | "Sugar, Sugar" | The Archies |
| 1 December | "Sugar, Sugar" | The Archies |
| 8 December | "Sugar, Sugar" | The Archies |
| 15 December | "Sugar, Sugar" | The Archies |
| 22 December | "Sugar, Sugar" | The Archies |
| 29 December | "Sugar, Sugar" | The Archies |

== See also ==
- 1969 in music
- List of number-one hits (Spain)
