= List of number-one singles of 1977 (Spain) =

This is a list of the Spanish Singles number-ones of 1977.

== Chart history ==
Issue date	Song	Artist
3 January	"Libertad Sin Ira"	Jarcha
10 January	"Sandokan"	Oliver Onions
17 January	"Sandokan"	Oliver Onions
24 January	"Sandokan"	Oliver Onions
31 January	"Don't Go Breaking My Heart"	Elton John & Kiki Dee
7 February	"Don't Go Breaking My Heart"	Elton John & Kiki Dee
14 February	"The Best Disco in Town"	Ritchie Family
21 February	"Daddy Cool"	Boney M
28 February	"Daddy Cool"	Boney M
7 March	"Daddy Cool"	Boney M
14 March	"Daddy Cool"	Boney M
21 March	"Daddy Cool"	Boney M
28 March	"Daddy Cool"	Boney M
4 April	"Daddy Cool"	Boney M
11 April	"If You Leave Me Now"	Chicago
18 April	"If You Leave Me Now"	Chicago
25 April	"Gavilán o Paloma"	Pablo Abraira
2 May	"Gavilán o Paloma"	Pablo Abraira
9 May	"Gavilán o Paloma"	Pablo Abraira
16 May	"Gavilán o Paloma"	Pablo Abraira
23 May	"Gavilán o Paloma"	Pablo Abraira
30 May	"Gavilán o Paloma"	Pablo Abraira
6 June	"Gavilán o Paloma"	Pablo Abraira
13 June	"Linda"	Miguel Bosé
20 June	"Linda"	Miguel Bosé
27 June	"Linda"	Miguel Bosé
4 July	"Linda"	Miguel Bosé
11 July	"Linda"	Miguel Bosé
18 July	"Linda"	Miguel Bosé
25 July	"Fiesta"	Raffaella Carrá
1 August	"Fiesta"	Raffaella Carrá
8 August	"Linda"	Miguel Bosé
15 August	"Speak Up Mambo(Cuéntame)"	Manhattan Transfer
22 August	"Speak Up Mambo(Cuéntame)"	Manhattan Transfer
29 August	"Speak Up Mambo(Cuéntame)"	Manhattan Transfer
5 September	"Speak Up Mambo(Cuéntame)"	Manhattan Transfer
12 September	"Speak Up Mambo(Cuéntame)"	Manhattan Transfer
19 September	"Son Tus Perjúmenes, Mujer"	Carlos Mejía Godoy y los de Palacagüina
26 September	"Son Tus Perjúmenes, Mujer"	Carlos Mejía Godoy y los de Palacagüina
3 October	"Rockollection"	Laurent Voulzy
10 October	"Son Tus Perjúmenes, Mujer"	Carlos Mejía Godoy y los de Palacagüina
17 October	"Rockollection"	Laurent Voulzy
24 October	"Rockollection"	Laurent Voulzy
31 October	"Rockollection"	Laurent Voulzy
7 November	"Rockollection"	Laurent Voulzy
14 November	"Rockollection"	Laurent Voulzy
21 November	"Rockollection"	Laurent Voulzy
28 November	"Rockollection"	Laurent Voulzy
5 December	"Rockollection"	Laurent Voulzy
12 December	"Oxygène (Part 4)"	Jean Michel Jarre
19 December	"Ma Baker"	Boney M
26 December	"Oxygène (Part 4)"	Jean Michel Jarre

== See also ==
- 1977 in music
- List of number-one hits (Spain)
