= List of number-one singles of 1992 (Spain) =

This is a list of the Spanish PROMUSICAE Top 20 Singles number-ones of 1992.

== Chart history ==
Issue date	Song	Artist
4 January	"Black or White"	Michael Jackson
11 January	"Black or White"	Michael Jackson
18 January	"Black or White"	Michael Jackson
25 January	"James Brown Is Dead"	L.A. Style
1 February	"Black or White"	Michael Jackson
8 February	"Black or White"	Michael Jackson
15 February	"Puta Madre"	Terra Wan
22 February	"Puta Madre"	Terra Wan
29 February	"Puta Madre"	Terra Wan
7 March	"Smells Like Teen Spirit"	Nirvana
14 March	"Smells Like Teen Spirit"	Nirvana
21 March	"Human Touch"	Bruce Springsteen
28 March	"Human Touch"	Bruce Springsteen
4 April	"Human Touch"	Bruce Springsteen
11 April	"Quimica"	Chimo Bayo
18 April	"Quimica"	Chimo Bayo
25 April	"Quimica"	Chimo Bayo
2 May	"Please Don't Go"	Double You
9 May	"Please Don't Go"	Double You
16 May	"Please Don't Go"	Double You
23 May	"Please Don't Go"	Double You
30 May	"Please Don't Go"	Double You
6 June	"Please Don't Go"	Double You
13 June	"Please Don't Go"	Double You
20 June	"Please Don't Go"	Double You
27 June	"Sensacion de Vivir"	Xuxa
4 July	"Sensacion de Vivir"	Xuxa
11 July	"Sensacion de Vivir"	Xuxa
18 July	"Sensacion de Vivir"	Xuxa
25 July	"Sensacion de Vivir"	Xuxa
1 August	"Sensacion de Vivir"	Xuxa
8 August	"Sensacion de Vivir"	Xuxa
15 August	"Sensacion de Vivir"	Xuxa
22 August	"Una Historia de Ellegibo"	Ellegibo
29 August	"Una Historia de Ellegibo"	Ellegibo
5 September	"Una Historia de Ellegibo"	Ellegibo
12 September	"Una Historia de Ellegibo"	Ellegibo
19 September	"Una Historia de Ellegibo"	Ellegibo
26 September	"Rhythm Is a Dancer"	Snap!
3 October	"Una Historia de Ellegibo"	Ellegibo
10 October	"Rhythm Is a Dancer"	Snap!
17 October	"Don't You Want Me"	Felix
24 October	"Don't You Want Me"	Felix
31 October	"Don't You Want Me"	Felix
7 November	"Because the Night"	Co.Ro featuring Tarlisa
14 November	"Because the Night"	Co.Ro featuring Tarlisa
21 November	"Because the Night"	Co.Ro featuring Tarlisa
28 November	"Because the Night"	Co.Ro featuring Tarlisa
5 December	"Because the Night"	Co.Ro featuring Tarlisa
12 December	"Because the Night"	Co.Ro featuring Tarlisa
19 December	"Because the Night"	Co.Ro featuring Tarlisa
26 December	"Because the Night"	Co.Ro featuring Tarlisa

== See also ==
- 1992 in music
- List of number-one hits (Spain)
