= List of number-one singles of 1962 (Spain) =

This is a list of the Spanish Singles number-ones of 1962.

== Chart history ==
Issue date	Song	Artist
1 January	"Moliendo Café"	Lucho Gatica
8 January	"Michael (Row The Boat Ashore)"	The Highwaymen
15 January	"Michael (Row The Boat Ashore)"	The Highwaymen
22 January	"Moliendo Café"	Mina
29 January	Siempre Es Domingo"	Baby Bell
5 February	Siempre Es Domingo"	Gelu
12 February	"Quisiera Ser"	Dúo Dinámico
19 February	"Quisiera Ser"	Dúo Dinámico
26 February	"Quisiera Ser"	Dúo Dinámico
5 March	"Quisiera Ser"	Dúo Dinámico
12 March	"Quisiera Ser"	Dúo Dinámico
19 March	"El Novio de Otra"	Connie Francis
26 March	"El Novio de Otra"	Connie Francis
2 April	"El Novio de Otra"	Connie Francis
9 April	"(Marie's the Name) His Latest Flame"	Elvis Presley
16 April	"Quiéreme Muy Fuerte" (Love Me Warm And Tender)	Paul Anka
23 April	"Quiéreme Muy Fuerte" (Love Me Warm And Tender)	Paul Anka
30 April	"Quiéreme Muy Fuerte" (Love Me Warm And Tender)	Paul Anka
7 May	"Quiéreme Muy Fuerte" (Love Me Warm And Tender)	Paul Anka
14 May	"Tango Italiano"	Milva
21 May	"Tango Italiano"	Milva
28 May	"Linda Muchachita"	Connie Francis
4 June	"Quiéreme Muy Fuerte" (Love Me Warm And Tender)	Paul Anka
11 June	"Quiéreme Muy Fuerte" (Love Me Warm And Tender)	Paul Anka
18 June	"Quiéreme Muy Fuerte" (Love Me Warm And Tender)	Paul Anka
25 June	"The Young Ones"	Cliff Richard And The Shadows
2 July	"Quiéreme Muy Fuerte" (Love Me Warm And Tender)	Paul Anka
9 July	"Quiéreme Muy Fuerte" (Love Me Warm And Tender)	Paul Anka
16 July	"Good Luck Charm"	Elvis Presley
23 July	"Good Luck Charm"	Elvis Presley
30 August	"Perdóname"	Dúo Dinámico
6 August	"Perdóname"	Dúo Dinámico
13 August	"Perdóname"	Dúo Dinámico
20 August	"Perdóname"	Dúo Dinámico
27 August	"Perdóname"	Dúo Dinámico
3 September	"Perdóname"	Dúo Dinámico
10 September	"Perdóname"	Dúo Dinámico
17 September	"La Balada de la Trompeta"	Los Cinco Latinos
24 September	"Et Maintenant"	Gilbert Becaud
1 October	"Et Maintenant"	Gilbert Becaud
8 October	"A Steel Guitar and a Glass Of Wine"	Paul Anka
15 October	"A Steel Guitar and a Glass Of Wine"	Paul Anka
22 October	"A Steel Guitar and a Glass Of Wine"	Paul Anka
29 October	"A Steel Guitar and a Glass Of Wine"	Paul Anka
5 November	"A Steel Guitar and a Glass Of Wine"	Paul Anka
12 November	"No More" (La Paloma)	Elvis Presley
19 November	"No More" (La Paloma)	Elvis Presley
26 November	"No More" (La Paloma)	Elvis Presley
3 December	"Balada Gitana"	Dúo Dinámico
10 December	"Balada Gitana"	Dúo Dinámico
17 December	"Balada Gitana"	Dúo Dinámico
24 December	"Balada Gitana"	Dúo Dinámico
31 December	"Cuando Calienta el Sol"	Los Hermanos Rigual

== See also ==
- 1962 in music
- List of number-one hits (Spain)
