= List of number-one singles of 1971 (Spain) =

This is a list of the Spanish Singles number-ones of 1971.

== Chart history ==
Issue date	Song	Artist
4 January	"Te quiero, Te Quiero"	Nino Bravo
11 January	"Te quiero, Te Quiero"	Nino Bravo
18 January	"Te quiero, Te Quiero"	Nino Bravo
25 January	"Te quiero, Te Quiero"	Nino Bravo
1 February	"Te quiero, Te Quiero"	Nino Bravo
8 February	"Te quiero, Te Quiero"	Nino Bravo
15 February	"Te quiero, Te Quiero"	Nino Bravo
22 February	"Candida"	Dawn
1 March	"My Sweet Lord"	George Harrison
8 March	"My Sweet Lord"	George Harrison
15 March	"My Sweet Lord"	George Harrison
22 March	"Chirpy Chirpy Cheep Cheep"	Middle of the Road
29 March	"Chirpy Chirpy Cheep Cheep"	Middle of the Road
5 April	"Chirpy Chirpy Cheep Cheep"	Middle of the Road
12 April	"My Sweet Lord"	George Harrison
19 April	"My Sweet Lord"	George Harrison
26 April	"My Sweet Lord"	George Harrison
3 May	"My Sweet Lord"	George Harrison
10 May	"My Sweet Lord"	George Harrison
17 May	"Qué Será" (Che Sará)	José Feliciano
24 May	"Qué Será" (Che Sará)	José Feliciano
31 May	"Qué Será" (Che Sará)	José Feliciano
7 June	"Qué Será" (Che Sará)	José Feliciano
14 June	"Qué Será" (Che Sará)	José Feliciano
21 June	"Qué Será" (Che Sará)	José Feliciano
28 June	"Qué Será" (Che Sará)	José Feliciano
5 July	"Qué Será" (Che Sará)	José Feliciano
12 July	"Another Day"	Paul McCartney
19 July	"Another Day"	Paul McCartney
26 July	"Fin De Semana"	Los Diablos
2 August	"Fin De Semana"	Los Diablos
9 August	"Fin De Semana"	Los Diablos
16 August	"Fin De Semana"	Los Diablos
23 August	"Help (Get Me Some Help)"	Tony Ronald
30 August	"Help (Get Me Some Help)"	Tony Ronald
6 September	"Help (Get Me Some Help)"	Tony Ronald
13 September	"Help (Get Me Some Help)"	Tony Ronald
20 September	"Help (Get Me Some Help)"	Tony Ronald
27 September	"Help (Get Me Some Help)"	Tony Ronald
4 October	"Help (Get Me Some Help)"	Tony Ronald
11 October	"Help (Get Me Some Help)"	Tony Ronald
18 October	"Help (Get Me Some Help)"	Tony Ronald
25 October	"Mammy Blue"	Pop-Tops
1 November	"Mammy Blue"	Pop-Tops
8 November	"Mammy Blue"	Pop-Tops
15 November	"Mammy Blue"	Pop-Tops
22 November	"Mammy Blue"	Pop-Tops
29 November	"Mammy Blue"	Pop-Tops
6 December	"Mammy Blue"	Pop-Tops
13 December	"Mammy Blue"	Pop-Tops
20 December	"Mammy Blue"	Pop-Tops
27 December	"Mammy Blue"	Pop-Tops

== See also ==
- 1971 in music
- List of number-one hits (Spain)
