= List of number-one singles of 1985 (Spain) =

This is a list of the Spanish Singles number-ones of 1985.

== Chart history ==
| Issue date | Song | Artist |
|---|---|---|
| 7 January | "Ghostbusters" | Ray Parker Jr. |
| 14 January | "¿Cómo Pudiste Hacerme Esto a Mí?" | Alaska y Dinarama |
| 21 January | "¿Cómo Pudiste Hacerme Esto a Mí?" | Alaska y Dinarama |
| 28 January | "¿Cómo Pudiste Hacerme Esto a Mí?" | Alaska y Dinarama |
| 4 February | "¿Cómo Pudiste Hacerme Esto a Mí?" | Alaska y Dinarama |
| 11 February | "¿Cómo Pudiste Hacerme Esto a Mí?" | Alaska y Dinarama |
| 18 February | "The NeverEnding Story" | Limahl |
| 25 February | "Amante Bandido" | Miguel Bosé |
| 4 March | "Amante Bandido" | Miguel Bosé |
| 11 March | "Woodpeckers from Space" | VideoKids |
| 18 March | "Woodpeckers from Space" | VideoKids |
| 25 March | "Woodpeckers from Space" | VideoKids |
| 1 April | "Woodpeckers from Space" | VideoKids |
| 8 April | "Ni Tú, Ni Nadie" | Alaska y Dinarama |
| 15 April | "Ni Tú, Ni Nadie" | Alaska y Dinarama |
| 22 April | "Ni Tú, Ni Nadie" | Alaska y Dinarama |
| 29 April | "Ni Tú, Ni Nadie" | Alaska y Dinarama |
| 6 May | "One Night in Bangkok" | Murray Head |
| 13 May | "Ni Tú, Ni Nadie" | Alaska y Dinarama |
| 20 May | "We Are the World" | USA For Africa |
| 27 May | "We Are the World" | USA For Africa |
| 3 June | "We Are the World" | USA For Africa |
| 10 June | "We Are the World" | USA For Africa |
| 17 June | "We Are the World" | USA For Africa |
| 24 June | "We Are the World" | USA For Africa |
| 1 July | "We Are the World" | USA For Africa |
| 8 July | "We Are the World" | USA For Africa |
| 15 July | "Baila" | Iván |
| 22 July | "Tarzan Boy" | Baltimora |
| 29 July | "Tarzan Boy" | Baltimora |
| 5 August | "Live Is Life" | Opus |
| 12 August | "Live Is Life" | Opus |
| 19 August | "Live Is Life" | Opus |
| 26 August | "Live Is Life" | Opus |
| 2 September | "Live Is Life" | Opus |
| 9 September | "Live Is Life" | Opus |
| 16 September | "Live Is Life" | Opus |
| 23 September | "Live Is Life" | Opus |
| 30 September | "Live Is Life" | Opus |
| 7 October | "Live Is Life" | Opus |
| 14 October | "Live Is Life" | Opus |
| 21 October | "Part-Time Lover" | Stevie Wonder |
| 28 October | "Part-Time Lover" | Stevie Wonder |
| 4 November | "Into the Groove" | Madonna |
| 11 November | "Part-Time Lover" | Stevie Wonder |
| 18 November | "Part-Time Lover" | Stevie Wonder |
| 25 November | "Part-Time Lover" | Stevie Wonder |
| 2 December | "We Don't Need Another Hero" | Tina Turner |
| 9 December | "Part-Time Lover" | Stevie Wonder |
| 16 December | "Part-Time Lover" | Stevie Wonder |
| 23 December | "Part-Time Lover" | Stevie Wonder |
| 30 December | "Part-Time Lover" | Stevie Wonder |

== See also ==
- 1985 in music
- List of number-one hits (Spain)
- List of number-one singles of the 1980s in Spain
