= List of number-one singles of 1965 (Spain) =

This is a list of the Spanish Singles number-ones of 1965.

== Chart history ==
Issue date	Song	Artist
4 January	"The House of the Rising Sun"	The Animals
11 January	"The House of the Rising Sun"	The Animals
18 January	"Ce Monde"	Richard Anthony
25 January	"Vamos A La Cama"	La Familia Telerín
1 February	"Qué Me Importa Del Mundo"(Che M'Importa Del Mondo)	Rita Pavone
8 February	"A Hard Day's Night"	The Beatles
15 February	"La Yenka"	Johnny & Charley
22 February	"La Yenka"	Johnny & Charley
1 March	"La Yenka"	Johnny & Charley
8 March	"La Yenka"	Johnny & Charley
15 March	"La Yenka"	Johnny & Charley
22 March	"La Yenka"	Johnny & Charley
29 March	"La Yenka"	Johnny & Charley
5 April	"La Yenka"	Johnny & Charley
12 April	"Flamenco"	Los Brincos
19 April	"Flamenco"	Los Brincos
26 April	"La Luna y el Toro"	Mikaela
3 May	"Venecia Sin Tí" (Que C'Est Triste Venise)	Charles Aznavour
10 May	"Downtown"	Petula Clark
17 May	"Downtown"	Petula Clark
24 May	"Downtown"	Petula Clark
31 May	"Poupée de cire, poupée de son"	France Gall
7 June	"Poupée de cire, poupée de son"	France Gall
14 June	"Esos Ojitos Negros"	Dúo Dinámico
21 June	"Poupée de Cire, poupée de son"	France Gall
28 June	"Poupée de Cire, poupée de son"	France Gall
5 July	"Poupée de Cire, poupée de son"	France Gall
12 July	"Poupée de Cire, poupée de son"	France Gall
19 July	"Poupée de Cire, poupée de son"	France Gall
26 July	"Poupée de Cire, poupée de son"	France Gall
2 August	"Poupée de Cire, poupée de son"	France Gall
9 August	"Chica Ye-Yé"	Conchita Velasco
16 August	"Chica Ye-Yé"	Conchita Velasco
23 August	"Chica Ye-Yé"	Conchita Velasco
30 August	"Borracho"	Los Brincos
6 September	"Borracho"	Los Brincos
13 September	"Borracho"	Los Brincos
20 September	"Me Lo Dijo Pérez"	Los Tres Sudamericanos
27 October	"Borracho"	Los Brincos
4 October	"Borracho"	Los Brincos
11 October	"El Mundo" (Il mondo)	Jimmy Fontana
18 October	"El Mundo" (Il mondo)	Jimmy Fontana
25 October	"El Mundo" (Il mondo)	Jimmy Fontana
1 November	"El Mundo" (Il mondo)	Jimmy Fontana
8 November	"Help"	The Beatles
15 November	"El Mundo" (Il Mondo)	Jimmy Fontana
22 November	"El Mundo" (Il Mondo)	Jimmy Fontana
29 November	"El Mundo" (Il Mondo)	Jimmy Fontana
6 December	"El Mundo" (Il Mondo)	Jimmy Fontana
13 December	"El Mundo" (Il Mondo)	Jimmy Fontana
20 December	"El Mundo" (Il Mondo)	Jimmy Fontana
27 December	"El Mundo" (Il Mondo)	Jimmy Fontana

== See also ==
- 1965 in music
- List of number-one hits (Spain)
