= List of number-one singles of 1988 (Spain) =

This is a list of the Spanish PROMUSICAE Top 20 Singles number-ones of 1988.

== Chart history ==
Issue date	Song	Artist
7 January	"Never Gonna Give You Up"	Rick Astley
14 January	"Never Can Say Goodbye"	The Communards
21 January	"Never Can Say Goodbye"	The Communards
28 January	"Never Can Say Goodbye"	The Communards
4 February	"Never Gonna Give You Up"	Rick Astley
11 February	"Always on My Mind"	Pet Shop Boys
18 February	"Always on My Mind"	Pet Shop Boys
25 February	"Always on My Mind"	Pet Shop Boys
3 March	"Always on My Mind"	Pet Shop Boys
10 March	"Together Forever"	Rick Astley
17 March	"Always on My Mind"	Pet Shop Boys
24 March	"Always on My Mind"	Pet Shop Boys
31 March	"Always on My Mind"	Pet Shop Boys
7 April	"Always on My Mind"	Pet Shop Boys
14 April	"Together Forever"	Rick Astley
21 April	"Together Forever"	Rick Astley
28 April	"Always on My Mind"	Pet Shop Boys
5 May	"Always on My Mind"	Pet Shop Boys
12 May	"Always on My Mind"	Pet Shop Boys
19 May	"Eloise"	Tino Casal
26 May	"Eloise"	Tino Casal
2 June	"Gimme Hope Jo'anna"	Eddy Grant
9 June	"Gimme Hope Jo'anna"	Eddy Grant
16 June	"Eloise"	Tino Casal
23 June	"Gimme Hope Jo'anna"	Eddy Grant
30 June	"Gimme Hope Jo'anna"	Eddy Grant
7 July	"Gimme Hope Jo'anna"	Eddy Grant
14 July	"Gimme Hope Jo'anna"	Eddy Grant
21 July	"Gimme Hope Jo'anna"	Eddy Grant
28 July	"Gimme Hope Jo'anna"	Eddy Grant
4 August	"Gimme Hope Jo'anna"	Eddy Grant
11 August	"Gimme Hope Jo'anna"	Eddy Grant
18 August	"Gimme Hope Jo'anna"	Eddy Grant
25 August	"Gimme Hope Jo'anna"	Eddy Grant
1 September	"Gimme Hope Jo'anna"	Eddy Grant
8 September	"Gimme Hope Jo'anna"	Eddy Grant
15 September	"Im Nin'alu"	Ofra Haza
22 September	"Perfect"	Fairground Attraction
29 September	"Yé ké yé ké"	Mory Kanté
3 October	"Desire"	U2
10 October	"Desire"	U2
17 October	"Im Nin'alu"	Ofra Haza
24 October	"Domino Dancing"	Pet Shop Boys
31 October	"Girl You Know It's True"	Milli Vanilli
7 November	"Girl You Know It's True"	Milli Vanilli
14 November	"Girl You Know It's True"	Milli Vanilli
21 November	"Nothing's Gonna Change My Love For You"	Glenn Medeiros
28 November	"Nothing's Gonna Change My Love For You"	Glenn Medeiros
5 December	"Nothing's Gonna Change My Love For You"	Glenn Medeiros
12 December	"Nothing's Gonna Change My Love For You"	Glenn Medeiros
19 December	"Nothing's Gonna Change My Love For You"	Glenn Medeiros
26 December	"Nothing's Gonna Change My Love For You"	Glenn Medeiros

== See also ==
- 1988 in music
- List of number-one hits (Spain)
- List of number-one singles of the 1980s in Spain
