= List of number-one singles of 1961 (Spain) =

This is a list of the Spanish Singles number-ones of 1961.

== Chart history ==
| Issue date | Song | Artist |
|---|---|---|
| 2 January | "Greenfields" | The Brothers Four |
| 9 January | "Greenfields" | The Brothers Four |
| 16 January | "Greenfields" | The Brothers Four |
| 23 January | "Greenfields" | The Brothers Four |
| 30 January | "Greenfields" | The Brothers Four |
| 6 February | "Greenfields" | The Brothers Four |
| 13 February | "Are You Lonesome Tonight?" | Elvis Presley |
| 20 February | "Are You Lonesome Tonight?" | Elvis Presley |
| 27 February | "The Green Leaves of Summer" | The Brothers Four |
| 6 March | "The Green Leaves of Summer" | The Brothers Four |
| 13 March | "Quince Años Tiene Mi Amor" | Dúo Dinámico |
| 20 March | "Quince Años Tiene Mi Amor" | Dúo Dinámico |
| 27 March | "Quince Años Tiene Mi Amor" | Dúo Dinámico |
| 3 April | "Quince Años Tiene Mi Amor" | Dúo Dinámico |
| 10 April | "24.000 baci" | Adriano Celentano |
| 17 April | "Quince Años Tiene Mi Amor" | Dúo Dinámico |
| 24 April | "Quince Años Tiene Mi Amor" | Dúo Dinámico |
| 1 May | "Quince Años Tiene Mi Amor" | Dúo Dinámico |
| 8 May | "Quince Años Tiene Mi Amor" | Dúo Dinámico |
| 15 May | "Quince Años Tiene Mi Amor" | Dúo Dinámico |
| 22 May | "Quince Años Tiene Mi Amor" | Dúo Dinámico |
| 29 May | "Quince Años Tiene Mi Amor" | Dúo Dinámico |
| 5 June | "Poesía En Movimiento " (Poetry in Motion) | Dúo Dinámico |
| 12 June | "Poesía En Movimiento " (Poetry in Motion) | Dúo Dinámico |
| 19 June | "Poesía En Movimiento " (Poetry in Motion) | Dúo Dinámico |
| 26 June | "Poesía En Movimiento " (Poetry in Motion) | Dúo Dinámico |
| 3 July | "La Novia" | Antonio Prieto |
| 10 July | "La Novia" | Antonio Prieto |
| 17 July | "Exodus" | Dúo Dinámico |
| 24 July | "Exodus" | Dúo Dinámico |
| 31 August | "Estando Contigo" | Dúo Dinámico |
| 7 August | "Tonight My Love, Tonight" | Paul Anka |
| 14 August | "Tonight My Love, Tonight" | Paul Anka |
| 21 August | "Tonight My Love, Tonight" | Paul Anka |
| 28 August | "Tonight My Love, Tonight" | Paul Anka |
| 4 September | "Enamorada" | José Guardiola |
| 11 September | "Enamorada" | José Guardiola |
| 18 September | "Quisiera Ser" | Dúo Dinámico |
| 25 September | "Quisiera Ser" | Dúo Dinámico |
| 2 October | "Quisiera Ser" | Dúo Dinámico |
| 9 October | "Quisiera Ser" | Dúo Dinámico |
| 16 October | "Quisiera Ser" | Dúo Dinámico |
| 23 October | "Quisiera Ser" | Dúo Dinámico |
| 30 October | "Quisiera Ser" | Dúo Dinámico |
| 6 November | "Quisiera Ser" | Dúo Dinámico |
| 13 November | "Quisiera Ser" | Dúo Dinámico |
| 20 November | "Moliendo Café" | Lucho Gatica |
| 27 November | "Moliendo Café" | Lucho Gatica |
| 4 December | "Moliendo Café" | Lucho Gatica |
| 11 December | "Moliendo Café" | Lucho Gatica |
| 18 December | "Moliendo Café" | Lucho Gatica |
| 25 December | "Moliendo Café" | Lucho Gatica |

== See also ==
- 1961 in music
- List of number-one hits (Spain)
