= List of number-one singles of 1975 (Spain) =

This is a list of the Spanish Singles number-ones of 1975.

== Chart history ==
Issue date	Song	Artist
6 January	"Todo El Tiempo Del Mundo"	Manolo Otero
13 January	"Todo El Tiempo Del Mundo"	Manolo Otero
20 January	"Todo El Tiempo Del Mundo"	Manolo Otero
27 January	"Todo El Tiempo Del Mundo"	Manolo Otero
3 February	"Todo El Tiempo Del Mundo"	Manolo Otero
10 February	"Todo El Tiempo Del Mundo"	Manolo Otero
17 February	"Todo El Tiempo Del Mundo"	Manolo Otero
24 February	"Todo El Tiempo Del Mundo"	Manolo Otero
3 March	"Todo El Tiempo Del Mundo"	Manolo Otero
10 March	"Todo El Tiempo Del Mundo"	Manolo Otero
17 March	"Todo El Tiempo Del Mundo"	Manolo Otero
24 March	"Todo El Tiempo Del Mundo"	Manolo Otero
31 March	"Todo El Tiempo Del Mundo"	Manolo Otero
7 April	"Todo El Tiempo Del Mundo"	Manolo Otero
14 April	"Todo El Tiempo Del Mundo"	Manolo Otero
21 April	"Todo El Tiempo Del Mundo"	Manolo Otero
28 April	"El Bimbó"	Bimbo Jet
5 May	"El Bimbó"	Bimbo Jet
12 May	"El Bimbó"	Bimbo Jet
19 May	"El Bimbó"	Bimbo Jet
26 May	"El Bimbó"	Bimbo Jet
2 June	"El Bimbó"	Bimbo Jet
9 June	"You're the First, the Last, My Everything"	Barry White
16 June	"You're the First, the Last, My Everything"	Barry White
23 June	"Bella Sin Alma"	Riccardo Cocciante
30 June	"Bella Sin Alma"	Riccardo Cocciante
7 July	"Bella Sin Alma"	Riccardo Cocciante
14 July	"Bella Sin Alma"	Riccardo Cocciante
21 July	"Bella Sin Alma"	Riccardo Cocciante
28 July	"Bella Sin Alma"	Riccardo Cocciante
4 August	"Bella Sin Alma"	Riccardo Cocciante
11 August	"Bella Sin Alma"	Riccardo Cocciante
18 August	"Bella Sin Alma"	Riccardo Cocciante
25 August	"Melina"	Camilo Sesto
1 September	"Melina"	Camilo Sesto
8 September	"Melina"	Camilo Sesto
15 September	"Melina"	Camilo Sesto
22 September	"Melina"	Camilo Sesto
29 September	"Melina"	Camilo Sesto
6 October	"Feelings"	Morris Albert
13 October	"Feelings"	Morris Albert
20 October	"Bella Sin Alma"	Riccardo Cocciante
27 October	"Bella Sin Alma"	Riccardo Cocciante
3 November	"Bella Sin Alma"	Riccardo Cocciante
10 November	"Bella Sin Alma"	Riccardo Cocciante
17 November	"Una Paloma Blanca"	George Baker Selection
24 November	"Femmes"	Nathalie et Christine
1 December	"The Hustle"	Van McCoy and The Soul City Symphony
8 December	"Amor, amor"	Lolita
15 December	"Amor, amor"	Lolita
22 December	"Amor, amor"	Lolita
29 December	"Amor, amor"	Lolita

== See also ==
- 1975 in music
- List of number-one hits (Spain)
