= List of number-one singles of 1967 (Spain) =

This is a list of the Spanish Singles number-ones of 1967.

== Chart history ==
Issue date	Song	Artist
2 January	"Black Is Black"	Los Bravos
9 January	"Black Is Black"	Los Bravos
16 January	"Black Is Black"	Los Bravos
23 January	"Black Is Black"	Los Bravos
30 January	"Lady Pepa"	Los Pekenikes
6 February	"Reach Out I'll Be There"	The Four Tops
13 February	"Reach Out I'll Be There"	The Four Tops
20 February	"Reach Out I'll Be There"	The Four Tops
27 February	"Reach Out I'll Be There"	The Four Tops
6 March	"Winchester Cathedral"	The New Vaudeville Band
13 March	"Reach Out I'll Be There"	The Four Tops
20 March	"Reach Out I'll Be There"	The Four Tops
27 March	"Good Vibrations"	The Beach Boys
3 April	"Good Vibrations"	The Beach Boys
10 April	"Good Vibrations"	The Beach Boys
17 April	"Good Vibrations"	The Beach Boys
24 April	"Hablemos del amor"	Raphael
1 May	"Hablemos del amor"	Raphael
8 May	"Hablemos del amor"	Raphael
15 May	"Marionetas en la cuerda" ("Puppet on a String")	Sandie Shaw
22 May	"Marionetas en la cuerda" ("Puppet on a String")	Sandie Shaw
29 May	"Marionetas en la cuerda" ("Puppet on a String")	Sandie Shaw
5 June	"Marionetas en la cuerda" ("Puppet on a String")	Sandie Shaw
12 June	"Marionetas en la cuerda" ("Puppet on a String")	Sandie Shaw
19 June	"Marionetas en la cuerda" ("Puppet on a String")	Sandie Shaw
26 June	"Marionetas en la cuerda" ("Puppet on a String")	Sandie Shaw
3 July	"Marionetas en la cuerda" ("Puppet on a String")	Sandie Shaw
10 July	"Marionetas en la cuerda" ("Puppet on a String")	Sandie Shaw
17 July	"La caza"	Juan y Junior
24 July	"La caza"	Juan y Junior
31 July	"La caza"	Juan y Junior
7 August	"La caza"	Juan y Junior
14 August	"Lola"	Los Brincos
21 August	"Lola"	Los Brincos
28 August	"Lola"	Los Brincos
4 September	"A Whiter Shade of Pale"	Procol Harum
11 September	"Nos falta fe"	Juan y Junior
18 September	"Lola"	Los Brincos
25 September	"A Whiter Shade Of Pale"	Procol Harum
2 October	"All You Need Is Love"	The Beatles
9 October	"All You Need Is Love"	The Beatles
16 October	"All You Need Is Love"	The Beatles
23 October	"Los chicos con las chicas"	Los Bravos
30 October	"San Francisco (Be Sure to Wear Flowers in Your Hair)"	Scott McKenzie
6 November	"Los chicos con las chicas"	Los Bravos
13 November	"Los chicos con las chicas"	Los Bravos
20 November	"Los chicos con las chicas"	Los Bravos
27 November	"Los chicos con las chicas"	Los Bravos
4 December	"En Aranjuez con tu amor" (Aranjuez, mon amour)	Richard Anthony
11 December	"En Aranjuez con tu amor" (Aranjuez, mon amour)	Richard Anthony
18 December	"En Aranjuez con tu amor" (Aranjuez, mon amour)	Richard Anthony
25 December	"En Aranjuez con tu amor" (Aranjuez, mon amour)	Richard Anthony

== See also ==
- 1967 in music
- List of number-one hits (Spain)
