= Los Canarios =

Spanish pop/progressive rock band

- Also known as: Canaries
- Origin: Las Palmas, Canary Islands
- Genres: Pop rock, psychedelic pop, progressive rock (later)
- Years active: 1964-1974
- Labels: B.T. Puppy Records, Movieplay, Ariola

Los Canarios were a Spanish pop rock (prog rock later) band from Canary Islands founded by Eduardo "Teddy" Bautista in 1964.

== Career ==
The band started off in Las Palmas as Canaries performing soul music and rhythm & blues with lyrics in English. Their first album Flying High with The Canaries (1967) was only released in the US, receiving a belated edition in Spain, in 1985.

The singles "Get on Your Knees" and "Free Yourself" became hits in Spain, as a second LP entitled Libérate! was released in 1970, but they had to disband momentarily when Bautista entered the military service. "Get on Your Knees", specifically, reached triple gold status.

Through the first half of the 70s the style of the band became closer to prog rock, as Bautista increasingly experimented with synthesizers and electronic music. All this came to fruition by means of Ciclos (1974), a double album that came like a symphonic rock adaptation of Vivaldi's "Four Seasons".

The group disbanded in 1974.

== Discography ==
- Flying High with The Canaries (1970; recorded earlier, probably in 1964, and sometimes incorrectly dated 1967)
- Libérate! (1970)
- Canarios vivos!!!! (1972)
- Ciclos (1974)

== Members ==
- Teddy Bautista
- Ramón Izquierdo
- Germán Pérez
- Graham Bircumshaw
- Álvaro Yébenes
- Ricky Morales
- "Tato" Luzardo
- "Nano" Muñoz
- Alfredo Mahiques
- Vicente Mahiques
