= Monna Bell =

Chilean singer

- Born: Ana Nora Escobar; 5 January 1938; Santiago, Chile
- Died: 21 April 2008 (aged 70); Tijuana, Mexico

Ana Nora Escobar (January 5, 1938 – April 21, 2008), known professionally as Monna Bell, was a Chilean singer who enjoyed a successful career in Spain, Mexico and other parts of Latin America. She was reportedly one of Juan Gabriel's muses. Bell was born in Santiago, Chile, in 1938. In the mid-1950s, she was barely in her teens when she won a talent contest held at Radio Mineria in Santiago, one of the most popular radio stations, and became a regular at the station's live broadcasts. Her voice caught the attention of band leader Roberto Inglez who, in 1956, hired her as a vocalist for his group and took her on a three-week gig at New York's Waldorf Astoria. They went over so well that the band and its brand new singer stayed for a year. Next they toured Europe and in Madrid Monna had such a phenomenal reception that she decided to go solo becoming a big sensation at the Pasapoga, the city's most fashionable night club.

In 1959 she performed a jazzy novelty tune titled "Un telegrama" at the First Benidorm Song Festival. The song won all the top awards and became an international major hit when Monna recorded it for the Hispavox label. It was the first of many hits that made her a recording sensation both in Europe and Latin America. She toured the world and decided to settle down in Mexico where she branched out into films and married cinematographer Alex Phillips Jr. It was not an enduring marriage but it produced daughter Jennifer and son Alex III who is currently a rock musician.

In the late 1960s she continued recording highly successful albums for the Musart label and did a lot of television work in Mexico and abroad. In the 1970s she signed with Orfeon and her recordings began suffering due to mediocre material and backing, however she continued touring on the strength of her old hits. By the 1980s her career was over and she decided to retire. Singer-composer Juan Gabriel tried to remedy the situation by writing and producing Monna Bell Ahora, an album released in 1993 by Sony which went nowhere. Monna went back to retirement and in the 2000s moved next to her daughter in Tijuana, Baja California.

Fans hoped for a successful return to performing, but Bell died of cardiac arrest after a successful colon cancer surgery on April 21, 2008. After her death many of her earlier recordings were reissued on CD. One of her songs, "Estaba Escrito", was used by Pedro Almodóvar" in his 1980 film, Pepi, Luci, Bom and Other Girls on the Heap (Pepi, Luci, Bom Y Otras Chicas Del Monton).

== Death ==
Monna Bell died of a stroke on April 21, 2008, in Tijuana, Mexico, at the age of 70.
