= Morir de amor (Miguel Bosé song) =

"Morir de amor" (Dying of love) is a 1978 hit song written by José Luis Perales for Miguel Bosé, from his sixth album Miguel. The song is one of the singer's signature broken heart tunes. The song begins "Morir de amor, despacio y en silencio".
