= Luis Aguilé =

Argentine singer, songwriter and actor

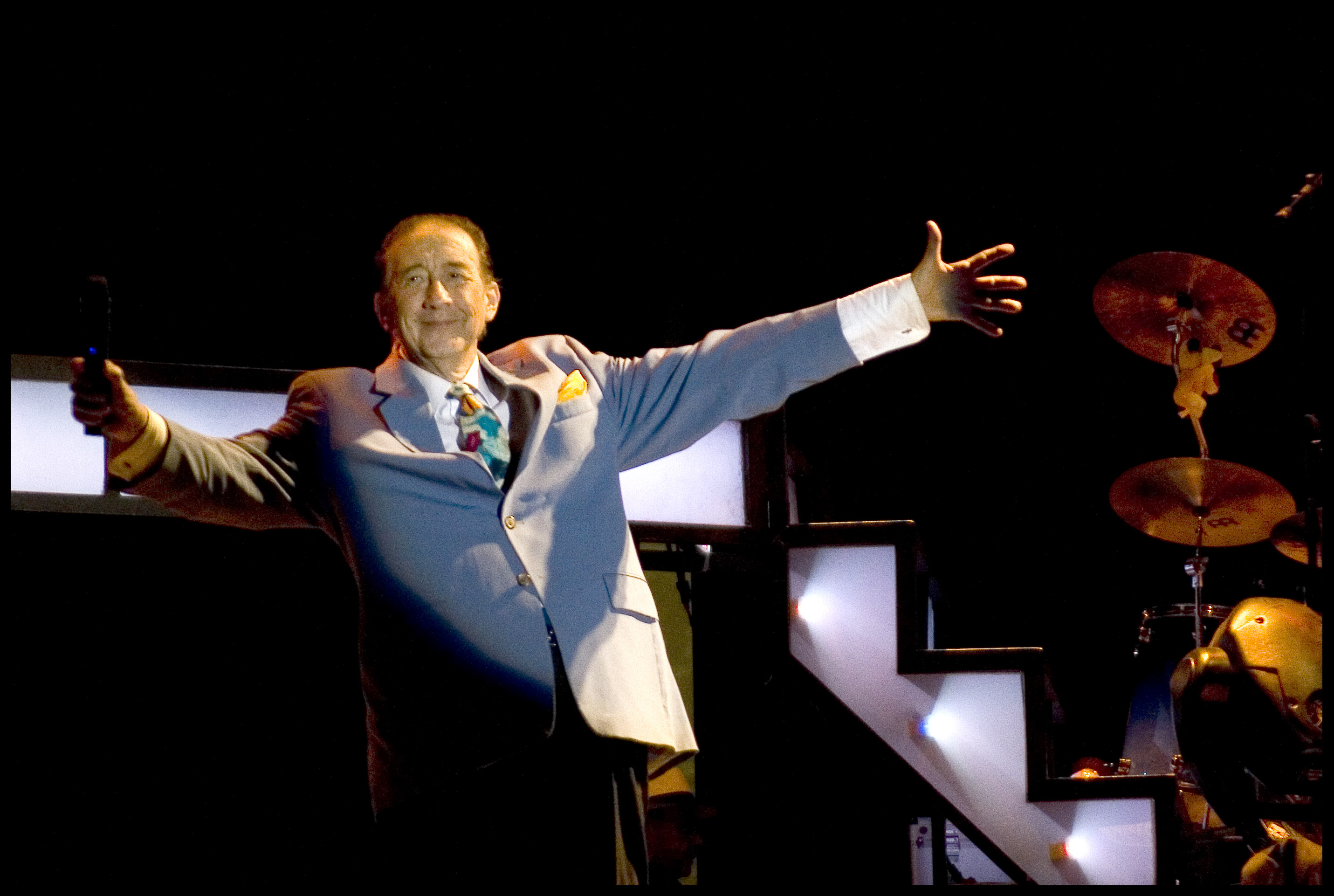
Luis Aguilé, 2007-07-29.

Luis María Aguilera Picca (24 February 1936 – 10 October 2009) was an Argentine singer, songwriter and actor, best known for worldwide hit song '"Cuando salí de Cuba" ("When I Left Cuba"). This song become the unofficial anthem for Cuban exiles. He also is the author and original singer of the Christmas song, "Ven a mi casa esta Navidad" ("Come to My House This Christmas"), later recorded by such artists as Lucero and Verónica Castro.

== Biography ==
He was born in Buenos Aires, and started his career in Argentina, where he distinguished himself as a brilliant showman. He later moved to Spain in 1963, where he had a successful musical career, both as a songwriter and singer, mixing romantic and fun lyrics.

In the 1980s, he was the musical assessor of the Televisión Española multidisciplinary contest Un, dos, tres... responda otra vez, directed by Chicho Ibáñez Serrador.

He is acknowledged as creating a Spanish popular musical genre known as "La canción del verano". He has more than 700 songs to his name.

Back in 1990, Luis Aguilé created the music and lyrics of the anthem of CF Monterrey. It is considered one of the best soccer anthems in the world. He also made the anthem of Chivas Guadalajara.

He has also worked as a music producer and author, mainly on children's books and novels. He had been married to Ana Rodríguez Ruiz since 1976.

Aguilé died of stomach cancer in Madrid, Spain, on 10 October 2009.

== Discography ==
- 1957: Luis Aguilé
- 1958: Canta la juventud de América
- 1959: Luis Aguilé, Vol. 3
- 1960: Luis Aguilé, Vol. 4
- Fiesta
- Aguilé y la chacota
- Me has enseñado a conocer lo que es amor
- Para mis amigos los niños
- El cuento que canta
- 1999: Superfiesta
