= List of number-one singles of the 1980s in Spain =

This is a list of singles that reached number one on the Spanish Music Charts during the 1980s.

== Number-one singles ==
Week	Song	Artist
1980-01-05	"Sin amor"	Iván
1980-01-12	"Háblame de ti"	Pecos
1980-01-19	"Háblame de ti"	Pecos
1980-01-26	"Háblame de ti"	Pecos
1980-02-02	"Man Gave Names to All the Animals"	Bob Dylan
1980-02-09	"Man Gave Names to All the Animals"	Bob Dylan
1980-02-16	"Man Gave Names to All the Animals"	Bob Dylan
1980-02-23	"Man Gave Names to All the Animals"	Bob Dylan
1980-03-01	"Man Gave Names to All the Animals"	Bob Dylan
1980-03-08	"Video Killed the Radio Star"	The Buggles
1980-03-15	"Video Killed the Radio Star"	The Buggles
1980-03-22	"Video Killed the Radio Star"	The Buggles
1980-03-29	"Video Killed the Radio Star"	The Buggles
1980-04-05	"Rapper's Delight"	The Sugarhill Gang
1980-04-12	"Rapper's Delight"	The Sugarhill Gang
1980-04-19	"Rapper's Delight"	The Sugarhill Gang
1980-04-26	"Rapper's Delight"	The Sugarhill Gang
1980-05-03	"Message in a Bottle"	The Police
1980-05-10	"Rapper's Delight"	The Sugarhill Gang
1980-05-17	"Rapper's Delight"	The Sugarhill Gang
1980-05-24	"La quiero a morir"	Francis Cabrel
1980-05-31	"La quiero a morir"	Francis Cabrel
1980-06-07	"Morir de amor"	Miguel Bosé
1980-06-14	"Funkytown"	Lipps Inc.
1980-06-21	"Funkytown"	Lipps Inc.
1980-06-28	"Funkytown"	Lipps Inc.
1980-07-05	"Funkytown"	Lipps Inc.
1980-07-12	"Funkytown"	Lipps Inc.
1980-07-19	"Funkytown"	Lipps Inc.
1980-07-26	"Hey!"	Julio Iglesias
1980-08-02	"Funkytown"	Lipps Inc.
1980-08-09	"Hey!"	Julio Iglesias
1980-08-16	"Hey!"	Julio Iglesias
1980-08-23	"Hey!"	Julio Iglesias
1980-08-30	"Hey!"	Julio Iglesias
1980-09-06	"Hey!"	Julio Iglesias
1980-09-13	"Sun of Jamaica"	Goombay Dance Band
1980-09-20	"Sun of Jamaica"	Goombay Dance Band
1980-09-27	"Sun of Jamaica"	Goombay Dance Band
1980-10-04	"Sun of Jamaica"	Goombay Dance Band
1980-10-11	"Sun of Jamaica"	Goombay Dance Band
1980-10-18	"Don Diablo"	Miguel Bosé
1980-10-25	"Xanadu"	Olivia Newton-John & Electric Light Orchestra
1980-11-01	"Xanadu"	Olivia Newton-John & Electric Light Orchestra
1980-11-08	"Xanadu"	Olivia Newton-John & Electric Light Orchestra
1980-11-15	"Xanadu"	Olivia Newton-John & Electric Light Orchestra
1980-11-22	"Xanadu"	Olivia Newton-John & Electric Light Orchestra
1980-11-29	"Xanadu"	Olivia Newton-John & Electric Light Orchestra
1980-12-06	"Woman in Love"	Barbra Streisand
1980-12-13	"Woman in Love"	Barbra Streisand
1980-12-20	"Woman in Love"	Barbra Streisand
1980-12-27	"Woman in Love"	Barbra Streisand
1981-01-03	"Woman in Love"	Barbra Streisand
1981-01-10	"Woman in Love"	Barbra Streisand
1981-01-17	"Woman in Love"	Barbra Streisand
1981-01-24	"(Just Like) Starting Over"	John Lennon
1981-01-31	"(Just Like) Starting Over"	John Lennon
1981-02-07	"(Just Like) Starting Over"	John Lennon
1981-02-14	"(Just Like) Starting Over"	John Lennon
1981-02-21	"What's in a Kiss "	Gilbert O'Sullivan
1981-02-28	"What's in a Kiss "	Gilbert O'Sullivan
1981-03-07	"What's in a Kiss "	Gilbert O'Sullivan
1981-03-14	"Qué será"	Ana Belén
1981-03-21	"Another One Bites the Dust"	Queen
1981-03-28	"Johnny and Mary"	Robert Palmer
1981-04-04	"Johnny and Mary"	Robert Palmer
1981-04-11	"Johnny and Mary"	Robert Palmer
1981-04-18	"Johnny and Mary"	Robert Palmer
1981-04-25	"Johnny and Mary"	Robert Palmer
1981-05-02	"Everybody's Got to Learn Sometime"	The Korgis
1981-05-09	"Everybody's Got to Learn Sometime"	The Korgis
1981-05-16	"Everybody's Got to Learn Sometime"	The Korgis
1981-05-23	"Te quiero tanto"	Iván
1981-05-30	"Stars on 45"	Stars on 45
1981-06-06	"Stars on 45"	Stars on 45
1981-06-13	"Stars on 45"	Stars on 45
1981-06-20	"Stars on 45"	Stars on 45
1981-06-27	"Stars on 45"	Stars on 45
1981-07-04	"Stars on 45"	Stars on 45
1981-07-11	"Stars on 45"	Stars on 45
1981-07-18	"Caperucita feroz"	Orquesta Mondragón
1981-07-25	"Stars on 45"	Stars on 45
1981-08-01	"De niña a mujer"	Julio Iglesias
1981-08-08	"De niña a mujer"	Julio Iglesias
1981-08-15	"De niña a mujer"	Julio Iglesias
1981-08-22	"De niña a mujer"	Julio Iglesias
1981-08-29	"Ma quale idea"	Pino D'Angiò
1981-09-05	"Hands up"	Ottawan
1981-09-12	"Ma quale idea"	Pino D'Angiò
1981-09-19	"Ma quale idea"	Pino D'Angiò
1981-09-26	"Ma quale idea"	Pino D'Angiò
1981-10-03	"Bette Davis Eyes"	Kim Carnes
1981-10-10	"Ma quale idea"	Pino D'Angiò
1981-10-17	"Ma quale idea"	Pino D'Angiò
1981-10-24	"Ma quale idea"	Pino D'Angiò
1981-10-31	"Ma quale idea"	Pino D'Angiò
1981-11-07	"Ma quale idea"	Pino D'Angiò
1981-11-14	"Ma quale idea"	Pino D'Angiò
1981-11-21	"Ma quale idea"	Pino D'Angiò
1981-11-28	"Hold on tight"	Electric Light Orchestra
1981-12-05	"Hold on tight"	Electric Light Orchestra
1981-12-12	"Hold on tight"	Electric Light Orchestra
1981-12-19	"Márchate ya"	Miguel Bosé
1981-12-26	"Márchate ya"	Miguel Bosé
1982-01-02	"Sera porque te amo"	Ricchi e Poveri
1982-01-09	"Sera porque te amo"	Ricchi e Poveri
1982-01-16	"Juntos"	Paloma San Basilio
1982-01-23	"On my Own"	Nikka Costa
1982-01-30	"On my Own"	Nikka Costa
1982-02-06	"On my Own"	Nikka Costa
1982-02-13	"On my Own"	Nikka Costa
1982-02-20	"On my Own"	Nikka Costa
1982-02-27	"On my Own"	Nikka Costa
1982-03-06	"On my Own"	Nikka Costa
1982-03-13	"On my Own"	Nikka Costa
1982-03-20	"On my Own"	Nikka Costa
1982-03-27	"Souvenir"	Orchestral Manoeuvres in the Dark
1982-04-03	"Souvenir"	Orchestral Manoeuvres in the Dark
1982-04-10	"Sharazan"	Al Bano y Romina Power
1982-04-17	"Souvenir"	Orchestral Manoeuvres in the Dark
1982-04-24	"Souvenir"	Orchestral Manoeuvres in the Dark
1982-05-01	"Me colé en una fiesta"	Mecano
1982-05-08	"Me colé en una fiesta"	Mecano
1982-05-15	"Me colé en una fiesta"	Mecano
1982-05-22	"Me colé en una fiesta"	Mecano
1982-05-29	"Me colé en una fiesta"	Mecano
1982-06-05	"Me colé en una fiesta"	Mecano
1982-06-12	"Ebony and Ivory"	Paul McCartney & Stevie Wonder
1982-06-19	"Ebony and Ivory"	Paul McCartney & Stevie Wonder
1982-06-26	"Ebony and Ivory"	Paul McCartney & Stevie Wonder
1982-07-03	"Ebony and Ivory"	Paul McCartney & Stevie Wonder
1982-07-10	"Ebony and Ivory"	Paul McCartney & Stevie Wonder
1982-07-17	"Bienvenidos"	Miguel Ríos
1982-07-24	"Maid of Orleans (The Waltz Joan of Arc)"	Orchestral Manoeuvres in the Dark
1982-07-31	"Eye in the Sky"	Alan Parsons Project
1982-08-07	"Eye in the Sky"	Alan Parsons Project
1982-8-14	"Eye in the Sky"	Alan Parsons Project
1982-08-21	"Just an Illusion"	Imagination
1982-08-28	"Just an Illusion"	Imagination
1982-09-04	"Just an Illusion"	Imagination
1982-09-11	"Just an Illusion"	Imagination
1982-09-18	"Just an Illusion"	Imagination
1982-09-25	"Just an Illusion"	Imagination
1982-10-02	"Eye in the Sky"	Alan Parsons Project
1982-10-09	"Babe, We're Gonna Love Tonite"	Lime
1982-10-16	"Babe, We're Gonna Love Tonite"	Lime
1982-10-23	"Babe, We're Gonna Love Tonite"	Lime
1982-10-30	"No sucederá más"	Claudia Mori
1982-11-06	"Can't Take My Eyes Off You"	Boys Town Gang
1982-11-13	"Abracadabra"	Steve Miller Band
1982-11-20	"No me vuelvo an enamorar"	Julio Iglesias
1982-11-27	"Amor de hombre"	Mocedades
1982-12-04	"Amor de hombre"	Mocedades
1982-12-11	"Amor de hombre"	Mocedades
1982-12-18	"Words"	F. R. David
1982-12-25	"Words"	F. R. David
1982-12-31	"Bienvenidos"	Miguel Ríos
1983-01-01	"Words"	F. R. David
1983-01-07	"Words"	F. R. David
1983-01-15	"Words"	F. R. David
1983-01-22	"Words"	F. R. David
1983-01-29	"Pass the Dutchie"	Musical Youth
1983-02-05	"Pass the Dutchie"	Musical Youth
1983-02-12	"Words"	F. R. David
1983-02-19	"Pass the Dutchie"	Musical Youth
1983-02-26	"Pass the Dutchie"	Musical Youth
1983-03-05	"The Girl Is Mine"	Paul McCartney & Michael Jackson
1983-03-12	"The Girl Is Mine"	Paul McCartney & Michael Jackson
1983-03-19	"Maneater"	Hall & Oates
1983-03-26	"The Girl Is Mine"	Paul McCartney & Michael Jackson
1983-04-02	"You Are a Danger"	Gary Low
1983-04-09	"You Are a Danger"	Gary Low
1983-04-16	"Embrujada"	Tino Casal
1983-04-23	"Embrujada"	Tino Casal
1983-04-30	"Embrujada"	Tino Casal
1983-05-07	"Embrujada"	Tino Casal
1983-05-14	"Embrujada"	Tino Casal
1983-05-21	"Billie Jean"	Michael Jackson
1983-05-28	"No tengo tiempo"	Azul y Negro
1983-06-04	"No tengo tiempo"	Azul y Negro
1983-06-11	"No tengo tiempo"	Azul y Negro
1983-06-18	"No tengo tiempo"	Azul y Negro
1983-06-25	"Barco a Venus"	Mecano
1983-07-02	"Barco a Venus"	Mecano
1983-07-09	"Barco a Venus"	Mecano
1983-07-16	"Barco a Venus"	Mecano
1983-07-23	"Moonlight Shadow"	Mike Oldfield
1983-07-30	"Moonlight Shadow"	Mike Oldfield
1983-08-06	"Moonlight Shadow"	Mike Oldfield
1983-08-13	"Moonlight Shadow"	Mike Oldfield
1983-08-20	"Moonlight Shadow"	Mike Oldfield
1983-08-27	"Dolce Vita"	Ryan Paris
1983-09-03	"Moonlight Shadow"	Mike Oldfield
1983-09-10	"Moonlight Shadow"	Mike Oldfield
1983-09-17	"Dolce Vita"	Ryan Paris
1983-09-24	"Moonlight Shadow"	Mike Oldfield
1983-10-01	"Flashdance... What a Feeling"	Irene Cara
1983-10-08	"Flashdance... What a Feeling"	Irene Cara
1983-10-15	"Flashdance... What a Feeling"	Irene Cara
1983-10-22	"Flashdance... What a Feeling"	Irene Cara
1983-10-29	"Flashdance... What a Feeling"	Irene Cara
1983-11-05	"Flashdance... What a Feeling"	Irene Cara
1983-11-12	"Flashdance... What a Feeling"	Irene Cara
1983-11-19	"I Like Chopin"	Gazebo
1983-11-26	"I Like Chopin"	Gazebo
1983-12-03	"Karma Chameleon"	Culture Club
1983-12-10	"Karma Chameleon"	Culture Club
1983-12-17	"Karma Chameleon"	Culture Club
1983-12-24	"Karma Chameleon"	Culture Club
1983-12-31	"Karma Chameleon"	Culture Club
1984-01-07	"Karma Chameleon"	Culture Club
1984-01-14	"Karma Chameleon"	Culture Club
1984-01-21	"Karma Chameleon"	Culture Club
1984-01-28	"Karma Chameleon"	Culture Club
1984-02-04	"Say, Say, Say"	Paul McCartney & Michael Jackson
1984-02-11	"Thriller"	Michael Jackson
1984-02-18	"Thriller"	Michael Jackson
1984-02-25	"Thriller"	Michael Jackson
1984-03-03	"Thriller"	Michael Jackson
1984-03-10	"Thriller"	Michael Jackson
1984-03-17	"All Night Long"	Lionel Richie
1984-03-24	"Thriller"	Michael Jackson
1984-03-31	"Thriller"	Michael Jackson
1984-04-07	"Thriller"	Michael Jackson
1984-04-14	"Thriller"	Michael Jackson
1984-04-21	"Thriller"	Michael Jackson
1984-04-28	"Thriller"	Michael Jackson
1984-05-05	"Relax"	Frankie Goes to Hollywood
1984-05-12	"Somebody's Watching Me"	Rockwell
1984-05-19	"Lobo-hombre en Paris"	La Unión
1984-05-26	"Lobo-hombre en Paris"	La Unión
1984-06-02	"Lobo-hombre en Paris"	La Unión
1984-06-09	"Lobo-hombre en Paris"	La Unión
1984-06-16	"Lobo-hombre en Paris"	La Unión
1984-06-23	"Lobo-hombre en Paris"	La Unión
1984-06-30	"Lobo-hombre en Paris"	La Unión
1984-07-07	"Lobo-hombre en Paris"	La Unión
1984-07-14	"Lobo-hombre en Paris"	La Unión
1984-07-21	"Lobo-hombre en Paris"	La Unión
1984-07-28	"Lobo-hombre en Paris"	La Unión
1984-08-04	"La Colegiala"	Gary Low
1984-08-11	"La Colegiala"	Gary Low
1984-08-18	"La Colegiala"	Gary Low
1984-08-25	"La Colegiala"	Gary Low
1984-09-01	"La Colegiala"	Gary Low
1984-09-08	"High Energy"	Evelyn Thomas
1984-09-15	"High Energy"	Evelyn Thomas
1984-09-22	"High Energy"	Evelyn Thomas
1984-09-29	"All of You"	Julio Iglesias & Diana Ross
1984-10-06	"All of You"	Julio Iglesias & Diana Ross
1984-10-13	"I Just Called to Say I Love You"	Stevie Wonder
1984-10-20	"Tentación"	José Luis Perales
1984-10-27	"I Just Called to Say I Love You"	Stevie Wonder
1984-11-03	"I Just Called to Say I Love You"	Stevie Wonder
1984-11-10	"I Just Called to Say I Love You"	Stevie Wonder
1984-11-17	"I Just Called to Say I Love You"	Stevie Wonder
1984-11-24	"I Just Called to Say I Love You"	Stevie Wonder
1984-12-01	"Sevilla"	Miguel Bosé
1984-12-08	"I Just Called to Say I Love You"	Stevie Wonder
1984-12-15	"Cómo pudiste hacerme esto a mí"	Alaska y Dinarama
1984-12-22	"Cómo pudiste hacerme esto a mí"	Alaska y Dinarama
1985-01-05	"Ghostbusters"	Ray Parker Jr.
1985-01-12	"Cómo pudiste hacerme esto a mí"	Alaska y Dinarama
1985-01-19	"Cómo pudiste hacerme esto a mí"	Alaska y Dinarama
1985-01-26	"Cómo pudiste hacerme esto a mí"	Alaska y Dinarama
1985-02-02	"Cómo pudiste hacerme esto a mí"	Alaska y Dinarama
1985-02-09	"Cómo pudiste hacerme esto a mí"	Alaska y Dinarama
1985-02-16	"The NeverEnding Story"	Limahl
1985-02-23	"Amante bandido"	Miguel Bosé
1985-03-02	"Amante bandido"	Miguel Bosé
1985-03-09	"Woodpeckers from Space"	VideoKids
1985-03-16	"Woodpeckers from Space"	VideoKids
1985-03-23	"Woodpeckers from Space"	VideoKids
1985-03-30	"Woodpeckers from Space"	VideoKids
1985-04-06	"Ni tú ni nadie"	Alaska y Dinarama
1985-04-13	"Ni tú ni nadie"	Alaska y Dinarama
1985-04-20	"Ni tú ni nadie"	Alaska y Dinarama
1985-04-27	"Ni tú ni nadie"	Alaska y Dinarama
1985-05-04	"Ni tú ni nadie"	Alaska y Dinarama
1985-05-11	"Ni tú ni nadie"	Alaska y Dinarama
1985-05-18	"We Are the World"	USA for Africa
1985-05-25	"We Are the World"	USA for Africa
1985-06-01	"We Are the World"	USA for Africa
1985-06-08	"We Are the World"	USA for Africa
1985-06-15	"We Are the World"	USA for Africa
1985-06-22	"We Are the World"	USA for Africa
1985-06-29	"We Are the World"	USA for Africa
1985-07-06	"We Are the World"	USA for Africa
1985-07-13	"Baila"	Iván
1985-07-20	"Tarzan Boy"	Baltimora
1985-07-27	"Tarzan Boy"	Baltimora
1985-08-03	"Live Is Life"	Opus
1985-08-10	"Live Is Life"	Opus
1985-08-17	"Live Is Life"	Opus
1985-08-24	"Live Is Life"	Opus
1985-08-31	"Live Is Life"	Opus
1985-09-07	"Live Is Life"	Opus
1985-09-14	"Live Is Life"	Opus
1985-09-21	"Live Is Life"	Opus
1985-09-28	"Live Is Life"	Opus
1985-10-05	"Live Is Life"	Opus
1985-10-12	"Live Is Life"	Opus
1985-10-19	"Part-Time Lover"	Stevie Wonder
1985-10-26	"Part-Time Lover"	Stevie Wonder
1985-11-02	"Into the Groove"	Madonna
1985-11-09	"Part-Time Lover"	Stevie Wonder
1985-11-16	"Part-Time Lover"	Stevie Wonder
1985-11-23	"Part-Time Lover"	Stevie Wonder
1985-11-30	"Part-Time Lover"	Stevie Wonder
1985-12-07	"Part-Time Lover"	Stevie Wonder
1985-12-14	"Part-Time Lover"	Stevie Wonder
1985-12-21	"Part-Time Lover"	Stevie Wonder
1985-12-28	"Part-Time Lover"	Stevie Wonder
1986-01-04	"Part-Time Lover"	Stevie Wonder
1986-01-11	"Part-Time Lover"	Stevie Wonder
1986-01-18	"Part-Time Lover"	Stevie Wonder
1986-01-25	"Part-Time Lover"	Stevie Wonder
1986-02-01	"Janey, Don't You Lose Heart"	Bruce Springsteen
1986-02-08	"Janey, Don't You Lose Heart"	Bruce Springsteen
1986-02-15	"Janey, Don't You Lose Heart"	Bruce Springsteen
1986-02-22	"Say You, Say Me"	Lionel Richie
1986-03-01	"Say You, Say Me"	Lionel Richie
1986-03-08	"Say You, Say Me"	Lionel Richie
1986-03-15	"Say You, Say Me"	Lionel Richie
1986-03-22	"Say You, Say Me"	Lionel Richie
1986-03-29	"Say You, Say Me"	Lionel Richie
1986-04-05	"Si tú eres mi hombre y yo tu mujer"	Jennifer Rush
1986-04-12	"Si tú eres mi hombre y yo tu mujer"	Jennifer Rush
1986-04-19	"Si tú eres mi hombre y yo tu mujer"	Jennifer Rush
1986-04-26	"Si tú eres mi hombre y yo tu mujer"	Jennifer Rush
1986-05-03	"Si tú eres mi hombre y yo tu mujer"	Jennifer Rush
1986-05-10	"Si tú eres mi hombre y yo tu mujer"	Jennifer Rush
1986-05-17	"Love Missile F1-11"	Sigue Sigue Sputnik
1986-05-24	"Love Missile F1-11"	Sigue Sigue Sputnik
1986-05-31	"Love Missile F1-11"	Sigue Sigue Sputnik
1986-06-07	"Brother Louie"	Modern Talking
1986-06-14	"Brother Louie"	Modern Talking
1986-06-21	"Brother Louie"	Modern Talking
1986-06-28	"Brother Louie"	Modern Talking
1986-07-05	"Irresistible"	Stephanie
1986-07-12	"La Puerta de Alcalá"	Víctor Manuel & Ana Belén
1986-07-19	"La Puerta de Alcalá"	Víctor Manuel & Ana Belén
1986-07-26	"La Puerta de Alcalá"	Víctor Manuel & Ana Belén
1986-08-02	"La Puerta de Alcalá"	Víctor Manuel & Ana Belén
1986-08-09	"La Puerta de Alcalá"	Víctor Manuel & Ana Belén
1986-08-16	"Rock Me Amadeus"	Falco
1986-08-23	"La Puerta de Alcalá"	Víctor Manuel & Ana Belén
1986-08-30	"La Puerta de Alcalá"	Víctor Manuel & Ana Belén
1986-09-06	"La Puerta de Alcalá"	Víctor Manuel & Ana Belén
1986-09-13	"La Puerta de Alcalá"	Víctor Manuel & Ana Belén
1986-09-20	"La Puerta de Alcalá"	Víctor Manuel & Ana Belén
1986-09-27	"La Puerta de Alcalá"	Víctor Manuel & Ana Belén
1986-10-04	"Easy Lady"	Spagna
1986-10-11	"Easy Lady"	Spagna
1986-10-18	"Easy Lady"	Spagna
1986-10-25	"Easy Lady"	Spagna
1986-11-01	"Easy Lady"	Spagna
1986-11-08	"Typical Male"	Tina Turner
1986-11-15	"¿A quién le importa?"	Alaska y Dinarama
1986-11-22	"¿A quién le importa?"	Alaska y Dinarama
1986-11-29	"¿A quién le importa?"	Alaska y Dinarama
1986-12-06	"¿A quién le importa?"	Alaska y Dinarama
1986-12-13	"Geronimo's Cadillac"	Modern Talking
1986-12-20	"Geronimo's Cadillac"	Modern Talking
1986-12-27	"Geronimo's Cadillac"	Modern Talking
1987-01-03	"Geronimo's Cadillac"	Modern Talking
1987-01-10	"Geronimo's Cadillac"	Modern Talking
1987-01-17	"Geronimo's Cadillac"	Modern Talking
1987-01-24	"Geronimo's Cadillac"	Modern Talking
1987-01-31	"The Final Countdown"	Europe
1987-02-07	"The Final Countdown"	Europe
1987-02-14	"The Final Countdown"	Europe
1987-02-21	"The Final Countdown"	Europe
1987-02-28	"The Final Countdown"	Europe
1987-03-07	"The Final Countdown"	Europe
1987-03-14	"The Final Countdown"	Europe
1987-03-21	"The Final Countdown"	Europe
1987-03-28	"The Final Countdown"	Europe
1987-04-0	"The Final Countdown"	Europe
1987-04-11	"Shake You Down"	Gregory Abbott
1987-04-18	"Walk Like an Egyptian"	The Bangles
1987-04-25	"Walk Like an Egyptian"	The Bangles
1987-05-02	"Walk Like an Egyptian"	The Bangles
1987-05-09	"Walk Like an Egyptian"	The Bangles
1987-05-16	"Multimix"	The Communards
1987-05-23	"Multimix"	The Communards
1987-05-30	"Multimix"	The Communards
1987-06-06	"Multimix"	The Communards
1987-06-13	"Multimix"	The Communards
1987-06-20	"Multimix"	The Communards
1987-06-27	"Multimix"	The Communards
1987-07-04	"Voyage, voyage"	Desireless
1987-07-11	"Voyage, voyage"	Desireless
1987-07-18	"Voyage, voyage"	Desireless
1987-07-25	"Voyage, voyage"	Desireless
1987-08-01	"Voyage, voyage"	Desireless
1987-08-08	"Voyage, voyage"	Desireless
1987-08-15	"Voyage, voyage"	Desireless
1987-08-22	"Voyage, voyage"	Desireless
1987-08-29	"Voyage, voyage"	Desireless
1987-09-05	"Voyage, voyage"	Desireless
1987-09-12	"Voyage, voyage"	Desireless
1987-09-19	"Voyage, voyage"	Desireless
1987-09-26	"Voyage, voyage"	Desireless
1987-10-01	"Voyage, voyage"	Desireless
1987-10-08	"Voyage, voyage"	Desireless
1987-10-15	"It's a Sin"	Pet Shop Boys
1987-10-22	"It's a Sin"	Pet Shop Boys
1987-10-29	"Tomorrow"	The Communards
1987-11-05	"Tomorrow"	The Communards
1987-11-12	"Never Gonna Give You Up"	Rick Astley
1987-11-19	"La Bamba"	Los Lobos
1987-11-26	"La Bamba"	Los Lobos
1987-12-03	"Never Gonna Give You Up"	Rick Astley
1987-12-10	"Never Gonna Give You Up"	Rick Astley
1987-12-17	"Soul Survivor"	C.C. Catch
1987-12-24	"Never Gonna Give You Up"	Rick Astley
1987-12-31	"Never Gonna Give You Up"	Rick Astley
1988-01-07	"Never Gonna Give You Up"	Rick Astley
1988-01-14	"Never Can Say Goodbye"	The Communards
1988-01-21	"Never Can Say Goodbye"	The Communards
1988-01-28	"Never Can Say Goodbye"	The Communards
1988-02-04	"Never Gonna Give You Up"	Rick Astley
1988-02-11	"Always on My Mind"	Pet Shop Boys
1988-02-18	"Always on My Mind"	Pet Shop Boys
1988-02-25	"Always on My Mind"	Pet Shop Boys
1988-03-03	"Always on My Mind"	Pet Shop Boys
1988-03-10	"Together Forever"	Rick Astley
1988-03-17	"Always on My Mind"	Pet Shop Boys
1988-03-24	"Always on My Mind"	Pet Shop Boys
1988-03-31	"Always on My Mind"	Pet Shop Boys
1988-04-07	"Always on My Mind"	Pet Shop Boys
1988-04-14	"Together Forever"	Rick Astley
1988-04-21	"Always on My Mind"	Pet Shop Boys
1988-05-05	"Always on My Mind"	Pet Shop Boys
1988-05-12	"Always on My Mind"	Pet Shop Boys
1988-05-19	"Eloise"	Tino Casal
1988-05-26	"Eloise"	Tino Casal
1988-06-02	"Gimme Hope Jo'anna"	Eddy Grant
1988-06-09	"Gimme Hope Jo'anna"	Eddy Grant
1988-06-16	"Eloise"	Tino Casal
1988-06-23	"Gimme Hope Jo'anna"	Eddy Grant
1988-06-30	"Gimme Hope Jo'anna"	Eddy Grant
1988-07-07	"Gimme Hope Jo'anna"	Eddy Grant
1988-07-14	"Gimme Hope Jo'anna"	Eddy Grant
1988-07-21	"Gimme Hope Jo'anna"	Eddy Grant
1988-07-28	"Gimme Hope Jo'anna"	Eddy Grant
1988-08-01	"Gimme Hope Jo'anna"	Eddy Grant
1988-08-1	"Gimme Hope Jo'anna"	Eddy Grant
1988-08-18	"Gimme Hope Jo'anna"	Eddy Grant
1988-08-25	"Gimme Hope Jo'anna"	Eddy Grant
1988-09-01	"Gimme Hope Jo'anna"	Eddy Grant
1988-09-01	"Gimme Hope Jo'anna"	Eddy Grant
1988-09-08	"Gimme Hope Jo'anna"	Eddy Grant
1988-09-15	"Im Nin'alu"	Ofra Haza
1988-09-22	"Perfect"	Fairground Attraction
1988-09-29	"Yé ké yé ké"	Mory Kanté
1988-10-03	"Desire"	U2
1988-10-10	"Desire"	U2
1988-10-17	"Im Nin'alu"	Ofra Haza
1988-10-24	"Domino Dancing"	Pet Shop Boys
1988-10-31	"Girl You Know It's True"	Milli Vanilli
1988-11-07	"Girl You Know It's True"	Milli Vanilli
1988-11-14	"Girl You Know It's True"	Milli Vanilli
1988-11-21	"Nothing's Gonna Change My Love for You"	Glenn Medeiros
1988-11-28	"Nothing's Gonna Change My Love for You"	Glenn Medeiros
1988-12-05	"Nothing's Gonna Change My Love for You"	Glenn Medeiros
1988-12-12	"Nothing's Gonna Change My Love for You"	Glenn Medeiros
1988-12-19	"Nothing's Gonna Change My Love for You"	Glenn Medeiros
1988-12-26	"Nothing's Gonna Change My Love for You"	Glenn Medeiros
1989-01-02	"Nothing's Gonna Change My Love for You"	Glenn Medeiros
1989-01-09	"Smooth Criminal"	Michael Jackson
1989-01-16	"Smooth Criminal"	Michael Jackson
1989-01-23	"Smooth Criminal"	Michael Jackson
1989-01-30	"Smooth Criminal"	Michael Jackson
1989-02-06	"Smooth Criminal"	Michael Jackson
1989-02-13	"Kiss"	Tom Jones
1989-02-20	"Real Gone Kid"	Deacon Blue
1989-02-27	"Real Gone Kid"	Deacon Blue
1989-03-06	"Real Gone Kid"	Deacon Blue
1989-03-13	"Like a Prayer"	Madonna
1989-03-20	"Like a Prayer"	Madonna
1989-03-27	"Like a Prayer"	Madonna
1989-04-03	"Like a Prayer"	Madonna
1989-04-10	"Like a Prayer"	Madonna
1989-04-17	"Like a Prayer"	Madonna
1989-04-24	"Like a Prayer"	Madonna
1989-05-01	"Like a Prayer"	Madonna
1989-05-08	"Like a Prayer"	Madonna
1989-05-15	"She Drives Me Crazy"	Fine Young Cannibals
1989-05-22	"Ibiza"	Amnesia
1989-05-29	"Ibiza"	Amnesia
1989-06-05	"Más y Más"	La Unión
1989-06-12	"Ibiza"	Amnesia
1989-06-19	"Ibiza"	Amnesia
1989-06-26	"The Look"	Roxette
1989-07-03	"The Look"	Roxette
1989-07-10	"The Look"	Roxette
1989-07-17	"The Look"	Roxette
1989-07-24	"The Look"	Roxette
1989-07-31	"The Look"	Roxette
1989-08-07	"The Look"	Roxette
1989-08-14	"The Look"	Roxette
1989-08-21	"Lambada"	Kaoma
1989-08-28	"Lambada"	Kaoma
1989-09-04	"Lambada"	Kaoma
1989-09-11	"Lambada"	Kaoma
1989-09-18	"Lambada"	Kaoma
1989-09-25	"Lambada"	Kaoma
1989-10-02	"Lambada"	Kaoma
1989-10-09	"Lambada"	Kaoma
1989-10-16	"Lambada"	Kaoma
1989-10-23	"Lambada"	Kaoma
1989-10-30	"Lambada"	Kaoma
1989-11-06	"Lambada"	Kaoma
1989-11-13	"Lambada"	Kaoma
1989-11-20	"Swing the Mood"	Jive Bunny & The Mastermixers
1989-11-27	"Swing the Mood"	Jive Bunny & The Mastermixers
1989-12-04	"Swing the Mood"	Jive Bunny & The Mastermixers
1989-12-11	"Pump Up the Jam"	Technotronic
1989-12-18	"Pump Up the Jam"	Technotronic
1989-12-25	"Pump Up the Jam"	Technotronic
