= Chile in the OTI Festival 1985 =

- OTI Festival 1985
- Participating broadcasters: Televisión Nacional de Chile (TVN); Corporación de Televisión de la Universidad Católica de Chile (UCTV); Corporación de Televisión de la Universidad de Chile (UTV)
- Country: Chile
- Selection process: National final
- Selection date: 13 August 1985

Competing entry
- Song: "Para poder vivir"
- Artist: Juan Carlos Duque
- Songwriters: Hernán Duque; Juan Carlos Duque

Placement
- Final result: 3rd

Participation chronology
◄1984 •	1985	• 1986►

Chile was represented at the OTI Festival 1985 with the song "Para poder vivir", written by Hernán Duque and Juan Carlos Duque, and performed by Juan Carlos Duque himself. The Chilean participating broadcasters, Televisión Nacional de Chile (TVN), Corporación de Televisión de la Universidad Católica de Chile (UCTV), and Corporación de Televisión de la Universidad de Chile (UTV), jointly selected their entry through a televised national final. The song, that was performed in position 14, placed third out of 21 competing entries.

== National stage ==
Televisión Nacional de Chile (TVN), Corporación de Televisión de la Universidad Católica de Chile (UCTV), and Corporación de Televisión de la Universidad de Chile (UTV), held a national final jointly to select their entry for the 14th edition of the OTI Festival. Eight songs were shortlisted for the televised final.

Competing entries on the national final – Chile 1985
Song	Artist	Songwriter(s)
"A través de ti"	Cristóbal	Francisco Puelma; Ana Maldonado
"Joven 1985"	Rodolfo Navech	Scottie Scott
"La fuerza de tu amor"	Soledad Guerrero	Carlos Grunewald
"Niño blanco, niño negro"	Pepe Aranda y los Rockmánticos	José Aranda
"Para poder vivir"	Juan Carlos Duque	Hernán Duque; Juan Carlos Duque
"Pasos de ciudad"	Grupo Kando	Alejandro Gaete
"Súbete a este viaje"	Keko Yunge	Keko Yunge
"Veintisiete"	Nino García	Nino García

=== National final ===
The national final was held on Tuesday 13 August 1985, beginning at 21:30 CLT (01:30+1 UTC), and was presented by José Alfredo Fuentes. The show featured guest performances by Fernando Ubiergo and the Karen Connolly ballet. It was staged by UCTV at its studios, and broadcast on TVN's Canal 7, UCTV's Canal 13, and UTV's Canal 11.

The jury consisted of five members: Pamela Hodar representing TVN, Luz María Vargas representing UTV, Javier Miranda representing UCTV, Mariano Cassanova, and Juan Lémann.

The winner was "Para poder vivir", written by Hernán Duque and Juan Carlos Duque, and performed by Juan Carlos Duque himself; with "La fuerza de tu amor", written by Carlos Grunewald and performed by Soledad Guerrero, placing second; and "Pasos de ciudad", written by Alejandro Gaete and performed by Grupo Kando, and "Joven 1985", written by Scottie Scott and performed by Rodolfo Navech, both placing third.

Winner

Result of the national final – Chile 1985
R/O	Song	Artist	Result
1	"Veintisiete"	Nino García	—N/a
2	"Súbete a este viaje"	Keko Yunge	—N/a
3	"Pasos de ciudad"	Grupo Kando	3
4	"La fuerza de tu amor"	Soledad Guerrero	2
5	"Joven 1985"	Rodolfo Navech	3
6	"Para poder vivir"	Juan Carlos Duque	1
7	"Niño blanco, niño negro"	Pepe Aranda y los Rockmánticos	—N/a
8	"A través de ti"	Cristóbal	—N/a

== At the OTI Festival ==
On 21 September 1985, the OTI Festival was held at Teatro Lope de Vega in Seville, Spain, hosted by Televisión Española, and broadcast live throughout Ibero-America. Juan Carlos Duque performed "Para poder vivir" in position 14, with Francisco Aranda conducting the event's orchestra, and placing third out of 21 competing entries.

The festival was broadcast on TVN's Canal 7, UCTV's Canal 13, and UTV's Canal 11 on delay at 21:30 CLT (01:30+1 UTC).
