= OTI Festival 1985 =

14th OTI Song Festival

Date and venue
- Final: 21 September 1985
- Venue: Teatro Lope de Vega; Seville, Spain

Organization
- Organizer: Organización de Televisión Iberoamericana (OTI)

Production
- Host broadcaster: Televisión Española (TVE)
- Director: Francisco Navarrete
- Musical director: Eduardo Leiva
- Presenters: Paloma San Basilio; Emilio Aragón

Participants
- Number of entries: 21
- Returning countries: Uruguay
- Non-returning countries: Brazil
- Participation map: Participating countries Countries that participated in the past but not in 1985

Vote
- Voting system: Each member of a single jury awards 5–1 points to its five favourite songs in a secret vote
- Winning song: Mexico "El fandango aquí"

The OTI Festival 1985 (Spanish: Decimocuarto Gran Premio de la Canción Iberoamericana, Portuguese: Décimo Quarto Grande Prêmio da Canção Ibero-Americana) was the 14th edition of the OTI Festival, held on 21 September 1985 at Teatro Lope de Vega in Seville, Spain, and presented by Paloma San Basilio and Emilio Aragón. It was organised by the Organización de Televisión Iberoamericana (OTI) and host broadcaster Televisión Española (TVE).

Broadcasters from twenty-one countries participated in the festival, with Brazil not participating for the first time. The winner was the song "El fandango aquí", written by Marcial Alejandro, and performed by Eugenia León representing Mexico; with "Y tú prohibida", written by Alejandro Vezzani and Miguel Lorena, and performed by Marcelo Alejandro representing Argentina, and "La Niña, la Pinta y la Santa María", written by Luis Padilla Guevara, and performed by Jesús Fichamba representing Ecuador, both placing second; and "Para poder vivir", written by Hernán Duque and Juan Carlos Duque, and performed by Juan Carlos Duque himself representing Chile, placing third.

== Location ==
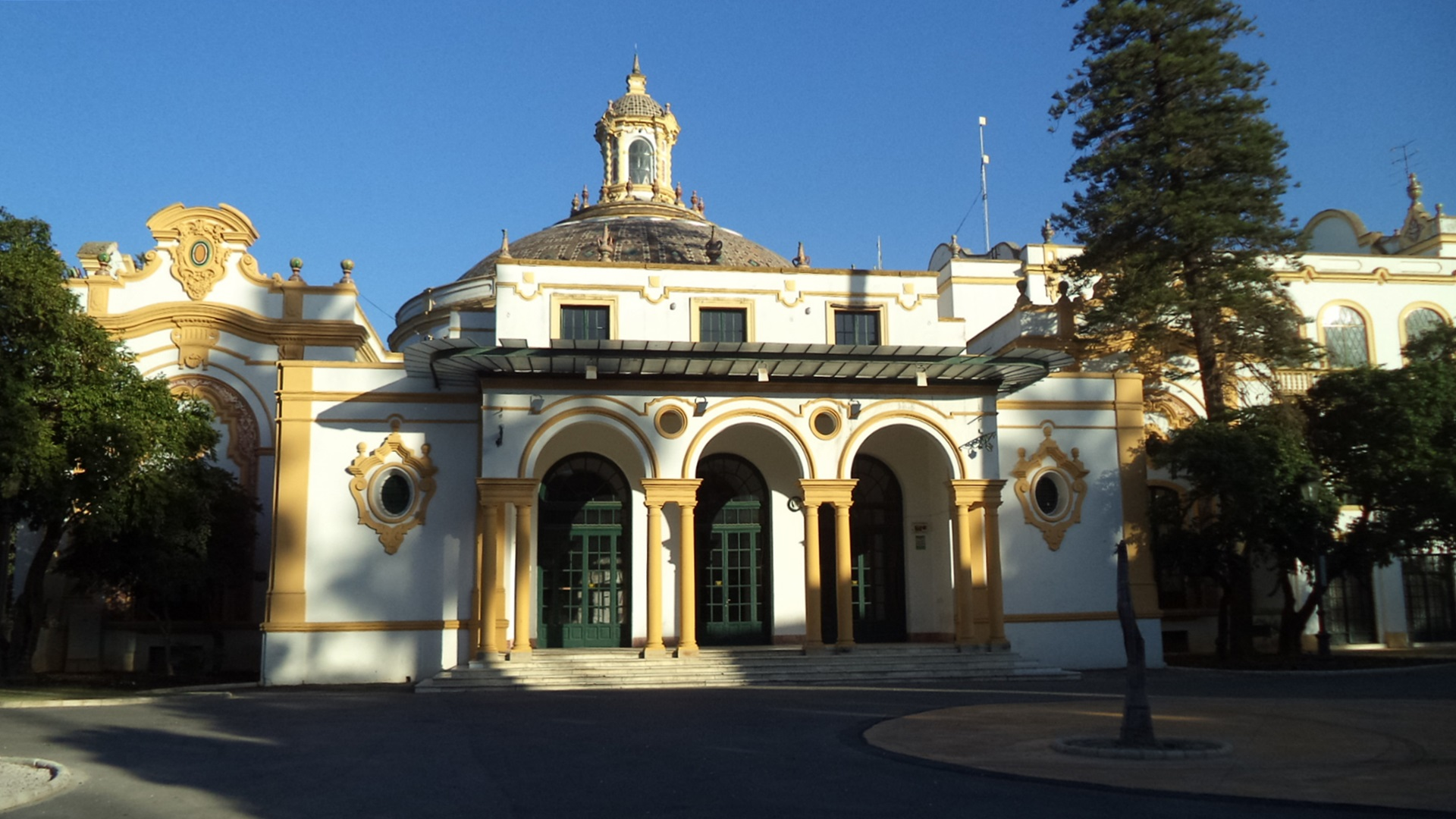
Teatro Lope de Vega, Seville – host venue of the OTI Festival 1985.

The Organización de Televisión Iberoamericana (OTI) designated Televisión Española (TVE) as the host broadcaster for the 14th edition of the OTI Festival. TVE staged the event in Seville. The venue selected was the Teatro Lope de Vega, a theatre built as part of the Pavilion of Seville at the Ibero-American Exposition of 1929. The event made use of both the theatre and the casino that formed the Pavilion, that was designed by Vicente Traver y Tomás.

TVE had initially planned to hold the event outdoors at the old Roman amphitheatre in Italica, but the idea was scrapped due to the impossibility of guaranteeing that it would not rain during the event or during the weeks of preparations and rehearsals.

== Participants ==
Broadcasters from twenty-one countries participated in this edition of the OTI festival. The OTI members, public or private broadcasters from Spain, Portugal, and twenty Spanish and Portuguese speaking countries of Ibero-America initially signed up for the festival, with Uruguay returning after having missed the previous edition. Brazil, who had initially signed up, ultimately did not participate for the first time because the winner of its national selection was under 18, and the performers at the festival had to be over that age. The OTI member in Bolivia justified its absence by lacking the financial resources required to participate.

Some of the participating broadcasters, such as those representing Chile, Guatemala, Mexico, the Netherlands Antilles, and the United States, selected their entries through their regular national televised competitions. Other broadcasters decided to select their entry internally.

Participants of the OTI Festival 1985
Country	Broadcaster(s)	Song	Artist	Songwriter(s)	Language	Conductor
Argentina		"Y tú prohibida"	Marcelo Alejandro	Alejandro Vezzani; Miguel Lorena	Spanish	Mike Ribas
Chile	TVN; UCTV; UTV	"Para poder vivir"	Juan Carlos Duque	Hernán Duque; Juan Carlos Duque	Spanish	Pancho Aranda
Colombia	Caracol Televisión; PUNCH; RTI	"Mi señora campesina"	Grupo Café	Raúl Rosero Polo	Spanish	Raúl Rosero Polo
Costa Rica	Telecentro; Teletica	"Dama y caballero"	Edgar Eduardo Vega	Rodolfo Emilio Morales	Spanish	Carlos Guzmán Bermúdez
Dominican Republic		"Con las alas rotas"	Gina D'Alessandro	Cheo Zorrilla	Spanish	Bertico Sosa
Ecuador		"La Niña, la Pinta y la Santa María"	Jesús Fichamba	Luis Padilla Guevara	Spanish	Gustavo Pacheco
El Salvador		"El vendedor de canciones"	Óscar Alejandro	Óscar Alejandro	Spanish	Eduardo Leiva
Guatemala		"Escenario"	Gloria Marina	Víctor Manuel Porras; Gloria Marina	Spanish	Eduardo Leiva
Honduras		"Una historia tantas veces contada"	Dúo tú y yo	Alberto Valladares	Spanish	Víctor Durán
Mexico	Televisa	"El fandango aquí"	Eugenia León	Marcial Alejandro	Spanish	Chucho Ferrer
Netherlands Antilles	ATM	"Adiós, mi amor"	Melania van der Veen	Erroll Colina	Spanish	Erroll Colina
Nicaragua	SSTV	"Carta de amor para ese tiempo"	María Eugenia Urroz	Mario Montenegro	Spanish	Raúl Martínez
Panama		"Con las manos atadas"	Rafael Della Serra	Julio Chú; Simón Abadi	Spanish	Toby Muñoz
Paraguay		"A veces quiero ser"	Lizza Bogado	Lizza Bogado; Mario Casartelli; Augusto Barreto	Spanish	Eduardo Leiva
Peru		"Señora de nadie"	Luis Alonso	Manuel Cortez	Spanish	Víctor Cuadros
Portugal	RTP	"Um ano depois"	Jorge Fernando	Mário Martins; Jorge Fernando	Portuguese	Shegundo Galarza
Puerto Rico	Canal 2 Telemundo	"Represento"	Juan Manuel Lebrón	Lou Briel	Spanish	Luis García
Spain	TVE	"Esta forma de querer"	Caco Senante	Caco Senante	Spanish	Eduardo Leiva
United States	SIN	"Te canto de mi raza"	Zobeida and Frank	Frank López Varona; María Teresa López	Spanish	Héctor Garrido
Uruguay	Sociedad Televisora Larrañaga	"Siempre más"	Nelson Candia	Mario de Azagra	Spanish	Julio Frade
Venezuela		"El primer vuelo"	Doris Hernández	Pablo Schneider	Spanish	Carlos Moreán

== Festival overview ==
The festival was held on Saturday 21 September 1985, beginning at 23:30 CEST (21:30 UTC). It was directed by Francisco Navarrete and presented by Paloma San Basilio and Emilio Aragón. The musical director was Eduardo Leiva, who conducted the 47-piece orchestra when required. The draw to determine the running order (R/O) was held on 20 August at La Rábida Friary in Palos de la Frontera (Huelva). Participants began rehearsing at the Teatro Lope de Vega on 16 September.

The show was opened with the hosts singing together "La música". In between the competing songs, the Ciudad de Sevilla ballet made a performance dancing sevillanas and Paloma San Basilio sang the song "Por culpa de una noche enamorada". The interval act featured a star guest performance by Rocío Jurado singing the songs "¡Decir Sevilla!" and "Necesito estar sola", and a medley of her hits "Ese hombre", "Lo siento mi amor", "Si amanece", "Como una ola", and "Señora", accompanied by the orchestra conducted by José Luis Sanesteban. Due to a three-way tie for first place during the voting, Rocio Jurado had to improvise and extend her performance to give the jury time to determine the result.

The winner was the song "El fandango aquí", written by Marcial Alejandro, and performed by Eugenia León representing Mexico; with "Y tú prohibida", written by Alejandro Vezzani and Miguel Lorena, and performed by Marcelo Alejandro representing Argentina, and "La Niña, la Pinta y la Santa María", written by Luis Padilla Guevara, and performed by Jesús Fichamba representing Ecuador, both placing second; and "Para poder vivir", written by Hernán Duque and Juan Carlos Duque, and performed by Juan Carlos Duque himself representing Chile, placing third. There was a trophy for each of the first three places. The first prize trophy was delivered by Guillermo Cañedo, president of OTI; the second prize trophy by Manuel del Valle, mayor of Seville; and the third prize trophy by Nicanor González, president of the OTI programs committee. The festival ended with a reprise of the winning entry followed by all the participants singing together "La música".

Winner

Results of the OTI Festival 1985
R/O	Country	Song	Artist	Place
1	El Salvador	"El vendedor de canciones"	Óscar Alejandro	—N/a
2	Costa Rica	"Dama y caballero"	Edgar Eduardo Vega	—N/a
3	Uruguay	"Siempre más"	Nelson Candia	—N/a
4	Venezuela	"El primer vuelo"	Doris Hernández	—N/a
5	United States	"Te canto de mi raza"	Zobeida and Frank	—N/a
6	Puerto Rico	"Represento"	Juan Manuel Lebrón	—N/a
7	Honduras	"Una historia tantas veces contada"	Dúo tú y yo	—N/a
8	Mexico	"El fandango aquí"	Eugenia León	1
9	Colombia	"Mi señora campesina"	Grupo Café	—N/a
10	Argentina	"Y tú prohibida"	Marcelo Alejandro	2
11	Netherlands Antilles	"Adiós, mi amor"	Melania van der Veen	—N/a
12	Paraguay	"A veces quiero ser"	Lizza Bogado	—N/a
13	Peru	"Señora de nadie"	Luis Alonso	—N/a
14	Chile	"Para poder vivir"	Juan Carlos Duque	3
15	Nicaragua	"Carta de amor para ese tiempo"	María Eugenia Urroz	—N/a
16	Panama	"Con las manos atadas"	Rafael Della Serra	—N/a
17	Guatemala	"Escenario"	Gloria Marina	—N/a
18	Portugal	"Um ano depois"	Jorge Fernando	—N/a
19	Spain	"Esta forma de querer"	Caco Senante	—N/a
20	Ecuador	"La Niña, la Pinta y la Santa María"	Jesús Fichamba	2
21	Dominican Republic	"Con las alas rotas"	Gina D'Alessandro	—N/a

=== Jury ===
Each of the seven members of the single jury awarded 5–1 points to its five favourite songs in a secret vote. Initially the jury was composed of eight members, but Raúl Velasco had to return hastily to Mexico due to the 1985 Mexico City earthquake that had occurred two days earlier. Only the top three places were revealed, with second place awarded to two songs jointly. The members of the jury were:

- Luis Miguel Dominguín – bullfighter
- Alberto Cortez – singer-songwriter
- Lola Flores – singer
- Teresa Sánchez López – model, Miss Spain 1984
- Antonio – dancer
- Adelaide Ferreira – singer, represented Portugal in 1984
- Fernando Ubiergo – singer-songwriter, won the festival for Chile in 1984

== Broadcast ==
The festival was broadcast in the 21 participating countries and in Bolivia, Brazil, Canada, and Haiti, where the corresponding OTI member broadcasters relayed the contest through their networks after receiving it live via satellite.

Known details on the broadcasts in each country, including the specific broadcasting stations and commentators are shown in the tables below.

Broadcasters and commentators in participating countries
Country	Broadcaster	Channel(s)	Commentator(s)	Ref.
Chile	TVN	Canal 7 (Note: Delayed broadcast at 21:30 CLT (01:30+1 UTC))		
Chile	UTV	Canal 11		
Chile	UCTV	Canal 13		
Costa Rica	Telecentro	Telecentro Canal 6		
Costa Rica	Telenac	Telenac Canal 2 (Note: Delayed broadcast at 21:00 CST (03:00+1 UTC))		
Costa Rica	Teletica	Canal 7		
Mexico	Televisa	Canal 2 (Note: Delayed broadcast at 17:30 CST (23:30 UTC))		
Netherlands Antilles	ATM	TeleCuraçao (Note: Delayed broadcast at 20:00 AST (00:00+1 UTC))		
Portugal	RTP	RTP1		
Spain	TVE	TVE 1	No commentary	
United States	SIN (Note: Delayed broadcast later that day by all SIN affiliates, each in their own time zone.)			
