= Chile in the OTI Festival =

- OTI Festival
- Participating broadcaster: Televisión Nacional de Chile (TVN); Universidad Católica de Chile Televisión (UCTV); Universidad de Chile Televisión (UTV) (Note: As Red de Televisión de la Universidad de Chile (RTU) in 1991–1993 and Red de Televisión Chilevisión (CHV) since 1994.); Universidad Católica de Valparaíso Televisión (UCVTV); Red Televisiva Megavisión; Compañía Chilena de Televisión (CCT)

Participation summary
- Appearances: 28
- First appearance: 1972
- Last appearance: 2000
- Highest placement: 1st: 1984, 1998
- Host: 1978, 1986
- Participation history: 1972; 1973; 1974; 1975; 1976; 1977; 1978; 1979; 1980; 1981; 1982; 1983; 1984; 1985; 1986; 1987; 1988; 1989; 1990; 1991; 1992; 1993; 1994; 1995; 1996; 1997; 1998; 2000

The participation of Chile in the OTI Festival began at the first OTI Festival in 1972. The Chilean participating broadcasters were Televisión Nacional de Chile (TVN), Universidad Católica de Chile Televisión (UCTV), Universidad de Chile Televisión (UTV), Universidad Católica de Valparaíso Televisión (UCVTV), Red Televisiva Megavisión, and Compañía Chilena de Televisión (CCT). All of them were members of the Organización de Televisión Iberoamericana (OTI), participated jointly in the festival, began to participate successively, and participated in all twenty-eight editions. They won the festival two times: in 1984 and 1998; and they hosted the event also two times: in 1978 and 1986.

== History ==
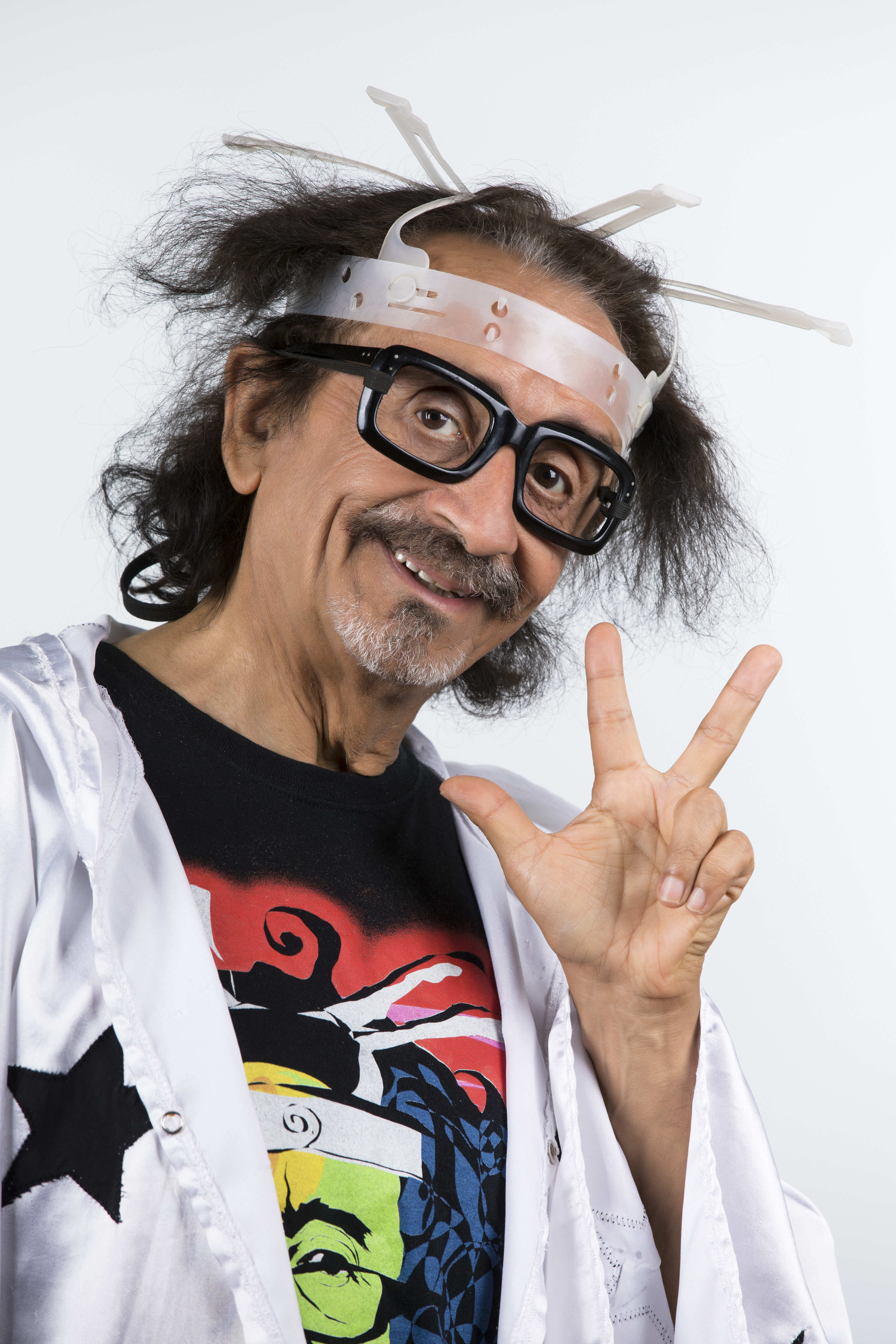
Florcita Motuda won the OTI Festival in 1998.

Televisión Nacional de Chile (TVN) debuted in the first edition of the OTI Festival representing Chile. In subsequent years, other Chilean broadcasters Universidad Católica de Chile Televisión (UCTV), Universidad de Chile Televisión (UTV), Universidad Católica de Valparaíso Televisión (UCVTV), Red Televisiva Megavisión, and Compañía Chilena de Televisión (CCT), gradually joined in. All of them were members of the Organización de Televisión Iberoamericana (OTI), and participated together in the festival. To select their entry, they held a televised national final each year. The winner, who was elected by a professional jury, would later represent Chile in the festival.

Initially, the broadcast of both the national final and the festival was done simultaneously by all the Chilean participating broadcasters, but from 1991 onwards, both the production and broadcast of the national final, as well as the broadcast of the festival, was done on a rotating basis by only one of them, representing them all.

Chile won the OTI Festival in two occasions: in 1984 with the song "Agualuna" by singer-songwriter Fernando Ubiergo, and in 1998 with the song "Fin de siglo, éste es el tiempo de inflamarse, deprimirse o transformarse" by rapper and comedian Florcita Motuda. In addition to these victories, it placed second with "Canción contra la tristeza" by Alberto Plaza in 1995; and got three third places: in 1976 with "Era sólo un chiquillo" by José Alfredo Fuentes, in 1985 with "Para poder vivir" by Juan Carlos Duque, and in 1992 with "Te prometo" by Pablo Herrera.

TVN, UCTV, and UTV, organized jointly the OTI Festival two times: in 1978 with UCVTV, and in 1986. Both events were held in the Municipal Theatre in Santiago.

== Participation overview ==
Table key
1	First place
2	Second place
3	Third place
F	Finalist
SF	Semi-finalist
◇	Contest cancelled

Year	Participant	Song	Artist	Songwriter(s)	Conductor	Place	Points
1972	TVN	"Una vez, otra vez"	Guillermo Basterrechea	Eduardo Tarifa; Guillermo Basterrechea	Eddy Guerín	7	4
1973	TVN	"Cuando tú vuelvas"	Antonio Zabaleta	Antonio Zabaleta	Horacio Saavedra	6	5
1974	TVN	"Amor, volveré"	José Alfredo Fuentes	José Alfredo Fuentes	Chucho Ferrer	7	4
1975	TVN	"Las puertas del mundo"	Osvaldo Díaz	Luis "Poncho" Venegas	Horacio Saavedra	5	5
1976	TVN; UCTV	"Era sólo un chiquillo"	José Alfredo Fuentes	José Alfredo Fuentes; Óscar Cáceres	Horacio Saavedra	3	12
1977	TVN; UCTV; UTV; UCVTV	"Oda a mi guitarra"	Capri	Nano Acevedo	Juan Azúa	11	2
1978	TVN; UCTV; UTV; UCVTV	"Pobrecito mortal, si quieres ver menos televisión, descubrirás qué aburrido estarás por la tarde"	Florcita Motuda	Raúl Alarcón	Horacio Saavedra	7	17
1979	TVN; UCTV; UTV	"La música"	Patricia Maldonado	Scottie Scott	Juan Salazar	14	10
1980	TVN; UCTV; UTV	"Sin razón"	Nino García	Nino García	Gonzalo García	14	9
1981	TVN; UCTV; UTV	"Si hoy tenemos que cantar a tanta gente, pensémoslo"	Florcita Motuda	Raúl Alarcón	Juan Salazar	5	18
1982	TVN; UCTV; UTV	"Si no hubieras estado tú"	Juan Pablo Méndez	Juan Pablo Méndez	Francisco Aranda	11	14
1983	TVN; UCTV; UTV	"La misma vida, el mismo modo"	Wildo	Wildo	Francisco Aranda	—N/a	
1984	TVN; UCTV; UTV	"Agualuna"	Fernando Ubiergo	Fernando Ubiergo	Francisco Aranda	1	—N/a
1985	TVN; UCTV; UTV	"Para poder vivir"	Juan Carlos Duque	Hernán Duque; Juan Carlos Duque	Francisco Aranda	3	—N/a
1986	TVN; UCTV; UTV	"Desde las nubes"	Pancho Puelma	Pancho Puelma	Francisco Aranda	—N/a	
1987	TVN; UCTV; UTV	"Chocando paredes"	Eduardo Valenzuela	Eduardo Valenzuela	Francisco Larraín	—N/a	
1988	TVN; UCTV; UTV	"Es mi libertad"	Cecilia Castro	Loreto Valenzuela Baudrand; Alfredo Sauvalle	Miguel Pizarro	7	6
1989	TVN; UCTV; UTV	"La movida"	Catalina Telias	Scottie Scott	Toly Ramírez	—N/a	
1990	TVN; UCTV; UTV	"Si no te tuviera a ti"	Osvaldo Díaz	Eduardo Carrasco	Miguel Zabaleta	—N/a	
1991	TVN; UCTV; RTU	"Haciendo música"	Claudio Escobar	Scottie Scott	René Calderón	F	—N/a
1992	TVN; UCTV; RTU; CCT; Megavisión	"Te prometo"	Pablo Herrera	Pablo Herrera; Alejandra Silva	Andrés Pollak	3	—N/a
1993	TVN; UCTV; RTU; CCT; Megavisión	"María y Manuel"	Keko Yunge	Keko Yunge	Marc Friedler	—N/a	
1994	TVN; UCTV; CHV; CCT; Megavisión	"La vida va"	María Inés Naveillán	Luis "Poncho" Venegas	Francisco Aranda	9	3
1995	TVN; UCTV; CHV; CCT; Megavisión	"Canción contra la tristeza"	Alberto Plaza	Alberto Plaza	Roberto Trujillo	2	—N/a
1996	TVN (Note: Incomplete list of the participating broadcasters.)	"Te confieso"	José Luis Moya	José Luis Ubiergo	Hugo Manzi	—N/a	
1997	TVN; UCTV; CHV; Megavisión	"Nunca sabrás cuánto te amo"	Rachel	Alejandro Afani	René Calderón	F	—N/a
1998	CCT	"Fin de siglo, éste es el tiempo de inflamarse, deprimirse o transformarse"	Florcita Motuda	Raúl Alarcón	Olivia Alarcón	1	—N/a
1999	Contest cancelled ◇						
2000	UCTV	"Tú, naturaleza"	Magdalena Matthey	Magdalena Matthey	Tilo González	SF	—N/a

== Hosting ==
Year	Host broadcasters	City	Venue	Hosts	Ref.
1978	TVN; UCTV; UTV; UCVTV	Santiago	Municipal Theatre	Raquel Argandoña; Raúl Matas	
1986	TVN; UCTV; UTV	Santiago	Municipal Theatre	Pamela Hodar; César Antonio Santis	
