= Chile in the OTI Festival 1986 =

- OTI Festival 1986
- Participating broadcasters: Televisión Nacional de Chile (TVN); Corporación de Televisión de la Universidad Católica de Chile (UCTV); Corporación de Televisión de la Universidad de Chile (UTV)
- Country: Chile
- Selection process: National selection
- Selection date: 18 October 1986

Competing entry
- Song: "Desde las nubes"
- Artist: Pancho Puelma
- Songwriter: Pancho Puelma

Placement
- Final result: Finalist

Participation chronology
◄1985 •	1986	• 1987►

Chile was represented at the OTI Festival 1986 with the song "Desde las nubes", written and performed by Pancho Puelma. The Chilean participating broadcasters, Televisión Nacional de Chile (TVN), Corporación de Televisión de la Universidad Católica de Chile (UCTV), and Corporación de Televisión de la Universidad de Chile (UTV), jointly selected their entry through a national televised competition with several phases. The song, that was performed in position 10, was not among the top-three places revealed. In addition, the three broadcasters were also the host broadcasters and staged the event at the Municipal Theatre in Santiago.

== National stage ==
Televisión Nacional de Chile (TVN), Corporación de Televisión de la Universidad Católica de Chile (UCTV), and Corporación de Televisión de la Universidad de Chile (UTV), held a national competition jointly to select their entry for the 15th edition of the OTI Festival. This edition of the national selection featured sixteen songs in the televised qualifying rounds, and eight in the final.

The shows were staged by TVN at its studios, and were broadcast on TVN's Canal 7, UCTV's Canal 13, and UTV's Canal 11.

Competing entries on the national selection – Chile 1986
Song	Artist	Songwriter(s)
"Alguien que te apaga el Sol"	Irene Llano	Scottie Scott
"Considerando"	Florcita Motuda	Raúl Florcita Alarcón Rojas
"Desde las nubes"	Pancho Puelma	Pancho Puelma
"Dónde está el amor"	Rodolfo Navech	Juan Antonio Labra
"Es hermoso comprobar"	Diego Luna	Luis Riderelli; Ronnie Knoller
"Este loco invento mío"	Cristóbal	Francisco Aranda
"Fantasma de la luz"	Verónica Jara	Verónica Jara
"Hablar de paz"	Braulio Alejandro	Braulio Alejandro
"Irreal, pero no imposible"	Pepe Aranda	Pepe Aranda
"Por si quieres saber"	Jaime Uauy	Francisco Larraín
"Que no se diga"	Jacqueline Cadet	Sandra Ramírez
"Reflexiones de paz"	Norman Ilic	Ricardo de la Fuente
"Ronda mis sentidos"	Jorge Caraccioli	Sergio Gormaz
"Tatuaje"	María Isabel Larraín	María Isabel Larraín
"Tú, mi libertad"	Humberto	Humberto
"Yo tengo fe, al igual que tú"	Jorge Eduardo	Wildo

=== Qualifying rounds ===
The two qualifying rounds were held on Saturdays 4 and 11 October 1986. Each round featured eight entries, of which the four highest-scoring advanced to the final. The first round was presented by Pamela Hodar and Javier Miranda, and featured guest performances by the ballet Huganzas, Verónica Brignole, Ángelo Venturini, Patricia Valenzuela, and José Zardoya; while the second round was presented by Katherine Salosny and Juan La Rivera, and featured guest performances by Santiago Cuatro, and Las Cuatro Brujas.

The jury was composed of Karen Connolly representing UCTV, Jorge Rencoret representing UTV, Gloria Simonetti representing TVN, Franz Benko, and José Luis Cordova.

Qualifier

Result of the first qualifying round of the national selection – Chile 1986
R/O	Song	Artist	Result
1	"Dónde está el amor"	Rodolfo Navech	Qualified
2	"Es hermoso comprobar"	Diego Luna	—N/a
3	"Tatuaje"	María Isabel Larraín	—N/a
4	"Ronda mis sentidos"	Jorge Caraccioli	—N/a
5	"Irreal, pero no imposible"	Pepe Aranda	Qualified
6	"Fantasma de la luz"	Verónica Jara	—N/a
7	"Por si quieres saber"	Jaime Uauy	Qualified
8	"Este loco invento mío"	Cristóbal	Qualified

Result of the second qualifying round of the national selection – Chile 1986
R/O	Song	Artist	Result
1	"Yo tengo fe, al igual que tú"	Jorge Eduardo	Qualified
2	"Alguien que te apaga el Sol"	Irene Llano	Qualified
3	"Hablar de paz"	Braulio Alejandro	—N/a
4	"Considerando"	Florcita Motuda	—N/a
5	"Desde las nubes"	Pancho Puelma	Qualified
6	"Que no se diga"	Jacqueline Cadet	—N/a
7	"Tú, mi libertad"	Humberto	—N/a
8	"Reflexiones de paz"	Norman Ilic	Qualified

=== National final ===
The final was held on Saturday 18 October 1986, and was presented by Pamela Hodar. The winner was "Desde las nubes", written and performed by Pancho Puelma; with "Por si quieres saber", written by Francisco Larraín and performed by Jaime Uauy, placing second; and "Reflexiones de paz", written by Ricardo de la Fuente and performed by Norman Ilic, placing third.

Winner

Result of the final of the national selection – Chile 1986
R/O	Song	Artist	Result
	"Dónde está el amor"	Rodolfo Navech	—N/a
	"Irreal, pero no imposible"	Pepe Aranda	—N/a
	"Por si quieres saber"	Jaime Uauy	2
	"Este loco invento mío"	Cristóbal	—N/a
	"Yo tengo fe, al igual que tú"	Jorge Eduardo	—N/a
	"Alguien que te apaga el Sol"	Irene Llano	—N/a
	"Desde las nubes"	Pancho Puelma	1
	"Reflexiones de paz"	Norman Ilic	3

== At the OTI Festival ==
On 15 November 1986, the OTI Festival was held at the Municipal Theatre in Santiago, Chile, hosted by TVN, UCTV, and UTV, and broadcast live throughout Ibero-America. Pancho Puelma performed "Desde las nubes" in position 10, with Pancho Aranda conducting the event's orchestra. In order for the song to participate in the festival, it was necessary to shorten it to fit within the required three minutes, as it originally lasted almost four minutes. The song was not among the top-three places revealed.

The festival was broadcast on TVN's Canal 7, UCTV's Canal 13, and UTV's Canal 11.
