= Bolivia in the OTI Festival =

- OTI Festival
- Participating broadcaster: Televisión Boliviana; Bolivisión

Participation summary
- Appearances: 19
- First appearance: 1972
- Last appearance: 2000
- Highest placement: 6th in 1994
- Participation history: 1972; 1973; 1974; 1975; 1976 – 1979; 1980; 1981; 1982; 1983 – 1985; 1986; 1987; 1988; 1989; 1990; 1991; 1992; 1993; 1994; 1995; 1996; 1997; 1998; 2000

The participation of Bolivia in the OTI Festival began at the first OTI Festival in 1972. The Bolivian participating broadcasters were Televisión Boliviana and Bolivisión, which were members of the Organización de Televisión Iberoamericana (OTI). Bolivia participated in nineteen of the twenty-eight editions. Its best result was sixth achieved in 1994.

Bolivia is one of the least lucky countries participating in the event. In fact, it only managed to enter the top 10 on two occasions: The first one in 1972 with Arturo Quesada and his entry "No volveré a pasar por allí" composed by the Spaniards Manuel de la Calva and Ramón Arcusa, (Members of Dúo Dinámico). Their second and last top 10 position came in 1994 with Gilka Gutierrez and her song "Para poder hablar de amor" which got the 8th place in the contest.

Bolivia withdrew from the event from 1975 to 1980 and then, withdrew again in 1981 because the poor placings and the dire economic situation of the participating broadcasters.

== Participation overview ==
Table key
SF	Semi-finalist
◇	Contest cancelled

Year	Song	Artist	Songwriter(s)	Conductor	Place	Points
1972	"No volveré a pasar por allí"	Arturo Quesada	Manuel de la Calva; Ramón Arcusa	Eddy Guerín	9	3
1973	"No sé vivir sin ti"	Arturo Quesada	Jesús González; Pedro Sanantonio	Ivan Paulo	14	1
1974	"Los muros"	Jenny	Javier Jorquera; Juliano	Javier Jorquera	14	2
1975	"Por esas cosas te amo"	Óscar Roca	Chicho Roca; Óscar Roca	Lito Peña	17	0
1976	Did not participate					
1977	Did not participate					
1978	Did not participate					
1979	Did not participate					
1980	"¡Qué suerte, qué pena!"	Susana Joffré	René Calderón Cortés; Lalo Lafaye Morris	René Calderón Cortés	22	0
1981	Did not participate					
1982	"Hay un nuevo día para ti"	Raúl Menacho	Raúl Menacho	Luis Neves	20	1
1983	Did not participate					
1984	Did not participate					
1985	Did not participate					
1986	"Para tocar lo más profundo"	Carlos Alejandro	Carlos Alejandro Suárez	Javier Jorquera	—N/a	
1987	"Utopía"	Hombre Nuevo	Reynaldo Rebollo	Charly Barrionuevo	—N/a	
1988	"Sólo un despertar"	Mimi	Nicolás Suárez Eyzaguirre	Nicolás Suárez Eyzaguirre	14	0
1989	"Como dos enamorados"	Milton Cortez	Milton Cortez		—N/a	
1990	Did not participate					
1991	"No eres ya tú"	Grupo Solocanto	Gastón González Aranibar; Huáscar Bolívar Vallejo	César Scotta	SF	—N/a
1992	"Eternamente amada"	Erick Ocampo	Erick Ocampo; H. Vilardel		—N/a	
1993	"El jardín de los sueños"	Adrián Barrenechea	Adrián Barrenechea	César Scotta	—N/a	
1994	"Para poder hablar de amor"	Gilka Gutiérrez	Edwin Castellanos		6	8
1995	"Adiós mi tierra"	Denise Rivera	Denise Rivera; Fernando Sancho; José Fernández	Fernando Sancho	—N/a	
1996	"Has estado con él"	Huáscar Bolívar Vallejo	Huáscar Bolívar Vallejo	Claudio Jácome Harb	—N/a	
1997	"El lugar donde te amé"	Grissel Bolívar Vallejo	Huáscar Bolívar Vallejo	Huáscar Bolívar Vallejo	SF	—N/a
1998	"El canto de las aves"	Fabio Zambrana	Fabio Zambrana	César Scotta	SF	—N/a
1999	Contest cancelled ◇					
2000	"Destino"	Micaela	Carlos Kieffer; Jens Meyer		SF	—N/a
