= Panama in the OTI Festival 1986 =

- OTI Festival 1986
- Participating broadcaster: RPC Televisión (RPC-TV)
- Country: Panama
- Selection process: National OTI Festival
- Selection date: 11 October 1986

Competing entry
- Song: "Quizás no es el momento"
- Artist: Paulette
- Songwriter: Paulette Thomas

Placement
- Final result: Finalist

Participation chronology
◄1985 •	1986	• 1987►

Panama was represented at the OTI Festival 1986 with the song "Quizás no es el momento", written and performed by Paulette Thomas. The Panamanian participating broadcaster, RPC Televisión (RPC-TV), selected its entry through a televised national final. The song, that was performed in position 14, was not among the top-three places revealed.

== National stage ==
RPC Televisión (RPC-TV), held a televised national final to select its entry for the 15th edition of the OTI Festival. Thirteen songs were shortlisted for the televised final.

Competing entries on the national final – Panama 1986
Song	Artist	Songwriter(s)
"Intenta ser feliz"	Álvaro Díaz	Álvaro Díaz
"El canto del cisne"		Argelia Buitrago
"Dos"	Marcia	Marcia Garibaldi; Vicente Garibaldi
"Quizás no es el momento"	Paulette	Paulette Thomas
"Mi historia"	Orlando Warst	Ariel Blanco
"Volver a soñar"	Betty Andrade	Rosa María Britton; Tabo Bobira
"Una balada por la soledad"	Tomás Méndez	Tomás Méndez
"Hombre animal depredador"	Vicente de Gracia	José Trujillo; Vicente de Gracia
"Un solo corazón"	Cilia Pérez and Lubek Spano	Guillermo Pérez
"Pobre señora y es como yo"	Ina Jean de la Cruz	Ina Jean de la Cruz
"Una vida más"	Angie da Costa	Roberto Murillo
"Sin respuesta"	Macedonio López	Macedonio López
"Contra el viento y la marea"	Henry Gorgona	Henry Gorgona

=== National final ===
RPC-TV staged the national final, that was broadcast on Canal 4 on Saturday 11 October 1986, beginning at 20:30 EST (01:30+1 UTC). The musical director was Cristobal Muñoz. The show featured guest performances by Pablo Azael, Dini, Betzaida, and Imelda Miller.

The winner was "Quizás no es el momento", written and performed by Paulette Thomas.

Winner

Result of the national final – Panama 1986
R/O	Song	Artist	Result
5	"Pobre señora y es como yo"	Ina Jean de la Cruz	
8	"Contra el viento y la marea"	Henry Gorgona	
	"Intenta ser feliz"	Álvaro Díaz	
	"El canto del cisne"		
	"Dos"	Marcia	
	"Quizás no es el momento"	Paulette	1
	"Mi historia"	Orlando Warst	
	"Volver a soñar"	Betty Andrade	
	"Una balada por la soledad"	Tomás Méndez	
	"Hombre animal depredador"	Vicente de Gracia	
	"Un solo corazón"	Cilia Pérez and Lubek Spano	
	"Una vida más"	Angie da Costa	
	"Sin respuesta"	Macedonio López	

== At the OTI Festival ==
On 15 November 1986, the OTI Festival was held at the Municipal Theatre in Santiago, Chile, hosted by Televisión Nacional de Chile (TVN), Universidad Católica de Chile Televisión (UCTV), and Universidad de Chile Televisión (UTV), and broadcast live throughout Ibero-America. Paulette performed "Quizás no es el momento" in position 14, with Cristobal Muñoz conducting the event's orchestra. The song was not among the top-three places revealed.
