= Netherlands Antilles in the OTI Festival 1985 =

- OTI Festival 1985
- Participating broadcaster: Antilliaanse Televisie Maatschappij (ATM)
- Country: Netherlands Antilles
- Selection process: OTI Antiyas 1985
- Selection date: 18 August 1985

Competing entry
- Song: "Adiós, mi amor"
- Artist: Melania van der Veen
- Songwriter: Erroll Colina

Placement
- Final result: Finalist

Participation chronology
◄1984 •	1985	• 1987►

The Netherlands Antilles was represented at the OTI Festival 1985 with the song "Adiós, mi amor", written by Erroll Colina, and performed by Melania van der Veen. The Netherlands Antillean participating broadcaster, Antilliaanse Televisie Maatschappij (ATM), selected its entry through a televised national final. The song, that was performed in position 11, was not among the top-three places revealed.

This was the last time that Aruba was part of the Netherlands Antilles, since it gained its separate status in 1986, and TeleAruba became independent from ATM. TeleAruba participated in the festival representing Aruba in 1989 and in 1991.

== National stage ==
Antilliaanse Televisie Maatschappij (ATM), held a national final to select its entry for the 14th edition of the OTI Festival. Sixteen songs were selected for the televised final, eight each from Aruba and Curaçao.

=== Aruban pre-selection ===
Given the precarious financial situation of the Aruban organizers, it was initially announced that, unlike previous years, the Aruban pre-selection would be carried out internally, with a jury choosing the songs from among the cassettes received. The deadline to register was 29 July 1985, and nineteen people initially registered. Finally, thanks to the collaboration of everyone involved, a televised pre-selection was possible. It was held on Sunday 11 August, beginning at 17:00 AST (21:00 UTC), at the ATM studios in Oranjestad. It was presented by Gerda Salas-De Groot and Tico Kuiperi, the musical director was Franklin Granadillo, and it was broadcast on TeleAruba and on the radio on Voz di Aruba. Fifteen acts competed, of which eight qualified for the national final.

Qualifier

Result of the Aruban pre-selection for OTI Antiyas 1985
R/O	Song	Artist	Songwriter(s)	Result
1	"La paz del mundo"	Francis Jacobs	Francis Jacobs; Poppy Irausquin; Howard Tromp	—N/a
2	"Motivos para creer en el amor"	Brenda Henriquez	Jossy Herrera	—N/a
3	"Joven descubre la vida"	Sigfried Codoy	Gabriel Flores	—N/a
4	"Hombre libre"	Edwin Berkemeyer	Edwin Berkemeyer	—N/a
5	"Si hay amor"	Mylene Marquez	Jeffrey Franken; Ruben Geerman	—N/a
6	"Un canto a Dios"	Don Ramon	Don Ramon Krozendijk	Qualified
7	"Allí estaré"	Claudius Philips	Claudius Philips	Qualified
8	"Música música"	Connie Henriquez	Roberto Martis	—N/a
9	"Brindis de amistad"	Tommy de Cuba	Roberto Martis	Qualified
10	"Comprendámonos"	Chicho Kock	Chicho Kock	Qualified
11	"Allá"	Marcelino Paesch	Rudy Herrera; Marcelino Paesch	Qualified
12	"Me olvidastes"	Papito Rafael	Oscar Serrano	Qualified
13	"Como antes"	Didi Wernet	Efrem Benita	Qualified
14	"Ella y tu indiferencia"	Yolanda van der Linden	Efrem Benita	Qualified
15	"Desilusión"	Krishnu Penso	Krishnu Penso	—N/a

=== National final ===
ATM held the national final on Sunday 18 August 1985, beginning at 18:00 AST (22:00 UTC), at its studios in Willemstad. It was broadcast live on TeleAruba and TeleCuraçao.

The winner was "Adiós, mi amor", written by Erroll Colina, and performed by Melania van der Veen. It was the first victory for a song from Curaçao in the national final, as the seven previous winners were all from Aruba.

Winner

Result of OTI Antiyas 1985
Island territory	Song	Artist	Result
Aruba	"Comprendámonos"	Chicho Kock	
Aruba	"Allí estaré"	Claudius Philips	
Aruba	"Como antes"	Didi Wernet	
Aruba	"Un canto a Dios"	Don Ramon	
Aruba	"Allá"	Marcelino Paesch	
Aruba	"Me olvidastes"	Papito Rafael	
Aruba	"Brindis de amistad"	Tommy de Cuba	
Aruba	"Ella y tu indiferencia"	Yolanda van der Linden	
Curaçao	"Amor en una lágrima"	Evanildo Marchena	
Curaçao	"Por otra me dejaste"	Krissy	
Curaçao	"La vida es bella"	Libia	
Curaçao	"Adiós, mi amor"	Melania van der Veen	1
Curaçao	"Canto, cantar"	Rignald Vidal	
Curaçao	"Canción de paz y amor"	Romeo Heye	
Curaçao	"Todo cambió"	Ruth Samson	
Curaçao	"Te quiero más"	William Anthony	

== At the OTI Festival ==
On 21 September 1985, the OTI Festival was held at Teatro Lope de Vega in Seville, Spain, hosted by Televisión Española, and broadcast live throughout Ibero-America. Melania van der Veen performed "Adiós, mi amor" in position 11, with Erroll Colina conducting the event's orchestra. The song was not among the top-three places revealed.

The festival was broadcast on delay at 20:00 AST (00:00+1 UTC) on TeleCuraçao.
