= Ecuador in the OTI Festival =

- OTI Festival
- Participating broadcaster: Asociación de Canales de Televisión del Ecuador (ACTVE) (Note: Early known as Asociación Ecuatoriana de Canales de Televisión (AECTV).)

Participation summary
- Appearances: 26
- First appearance: 1974
- Last appearance: 2000
- Highest placement: 2nd in 1985, 1987
- Host: 1996
- Participation history: 1974; 1975; 1976; 1977; 1978; 1979; 1980; 1981; 1982; 1983; 1984; 1985; 1986; 1987; 1988; 1989; 1990; 1991; 1992; 1993; 1994; 1995; 1996; 1997; 1998; 2000

The participation of Ecuador in the OTI Festival began at the third OTI Festival in 1974. The Ecuadorian broadcasters that formed the Asociación de Canales de Televisión del Ecuador (ACTVE) participated joinlty in the event, as members of the Organización de Televisión Iberoamericana (OTI). They participated in all twenty-six editions after their debut, and hosted the 1996 festival. Their best result was second achieved in 1985 and 1987.

== History ==
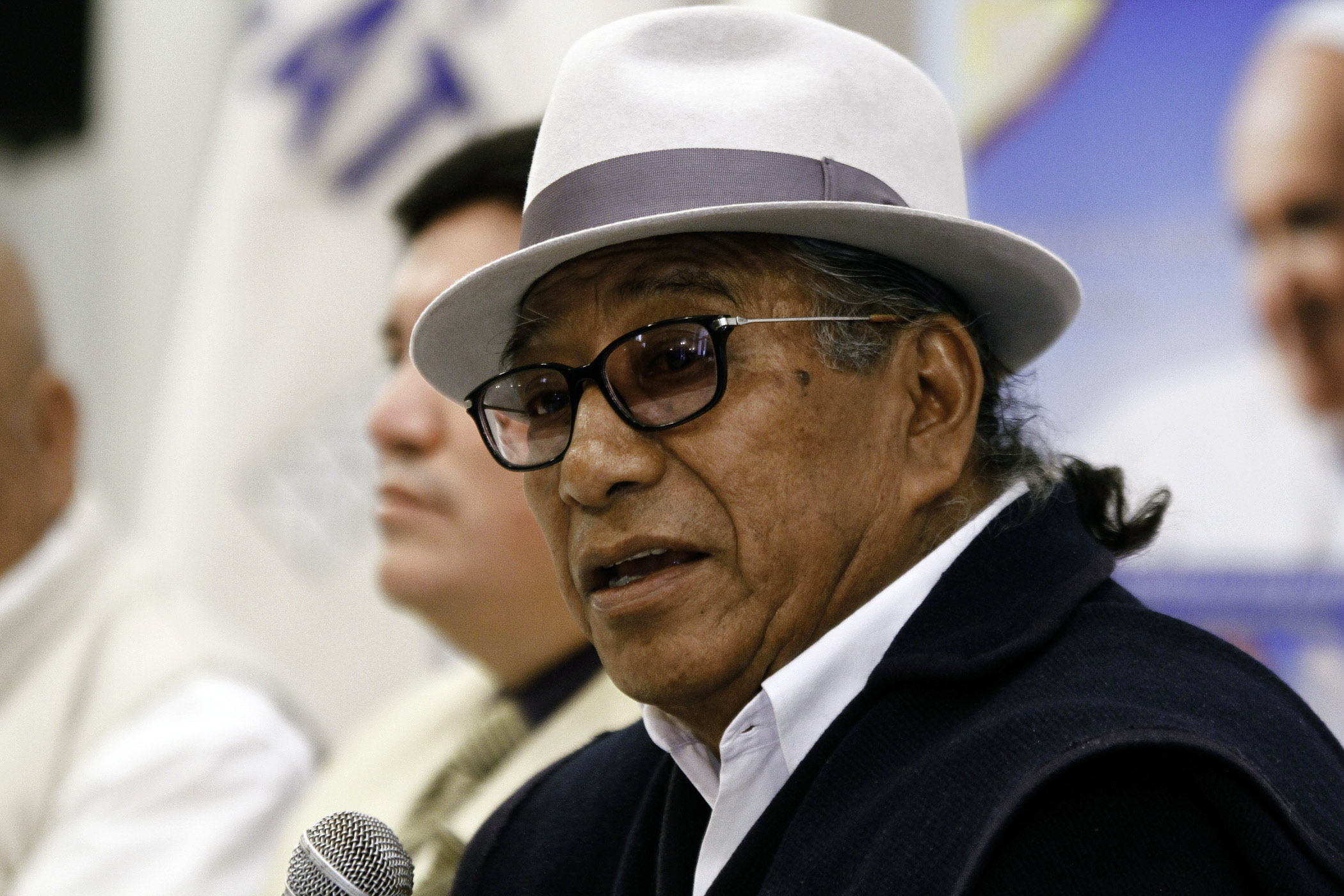
The indigenous singer Jesús Fichamba took second place in 1985.

The broadcasters that formed the Asociación de Canales de Televisión del Ecuador (ACTVE), whose early name was Asociación Ecuatoriana de Canales de Televisión (AECTV), participated jointly in the OTI Festival. Broadcasters such as Ecuavisa, Gamavisión, and Teleamazonas, were members of the association. Their history in the festival did not yield any victories; however, they achieved a number of top 5 finishes.

The Ecuatorian debut in the OTI Festival was successful because of "Las tres mariposas" by Hilda Murillo's fifth place. After that, the country didn't repeat that success, and in the following two years, the delegation ended in the bottom five of the scoreboard. However, in 1977, "Sonreir cuando quiero llorar" by Marielisa took fifth place again. In contrast, in 1978, 1979, and 1980, Ecuador registered its worst placings ever with two last places with zero points.

After some unsuccessful participations, in 1985, the indigenous Quechua singer Jesús Fichamba recorded a second-place finish for Ecuador for the first time with his song "La pinta, la niña y la Santa María" in a reference to the three boats led by Christopher Columbus, who discovered America. The performer, who appeared on stage with the traditional Quechua suit, was acclaimed.

In 1997, they repeated the success with another indigenous singer, Gustavo Velázquez, and his ethnic pop song "Mi amigo el cóndor".

=== National Final ===
The Asociación de Canales de Televisión del Ecuador (ACTVE) organised an annual national contest in order to select the Ecuatorian participant in the OTI Festival. As in the other participating broadcasters who opted for this way of selecting their entrants, the winner was selected by a professional jury.

== Participation overview ==
Table key
2	Second place
SF	Semi-finalist
◇	Contest cancelled

Year	Song	Artist	Songwriter(s)	Conductor	Place	Points
1974	"Las tres mariposas"	Hilda Murillo	Romeo Caicedo; Héctor Garrido	Chucho Ferrer	5	7
1975	"Quiero componer el mundo con mis manos"	Miriam Constante	Carlos Lozano; Lucía Gómez de Bracho	Claudio Fabbri	17	0
1976	"Esos veinte años"	Tito del Salto			15	1
1977	"Sonreir cuando quiero llorar"	Marielisa	Luis Padilla Guevara	Claudio Fabbri	5	4
1978	"Juan el infeliz"	Gracián	Victoria Puig de Lange	Claudio Fabbri	18	0
1979	"Cómo tener tu cariño"	Miguel Ángel Vergara	Francisco Moreno Bustamante	Claudio Fabre	20	0
1980	"En un instante"	Jeaneth Salgado	Francisco José Betancourt	Julio Cármenes	21	3
1981	"América"	Hermanos Diablo	Juan Carlos Terán G.		12	11
1982	"Aprenderé"	Andrés Kattan	Francisco Betancourt	Ricardo Antón	21	0
1983	"Menos de ti"	Nicky Bravo	Freddy Bardellini	Héctor Garrido	—N/a	
1984	"Déjame saber"	Alfredo Mármol	Freddy Bardellini	Gustavo Pacheco	—N/a	
1985	"La Niña, la Pinta y la Santa María"	Jesús Fichamba	Luis Padilla Guevara	Gustavo Pacheco	2	—N/a
1986	"Pobres niños, pobre mundo"	Tannia López	Jimmy Arias	Richard Anton	—N/a	
1987	"Mi amigo el cóndor"	Gustavo Velásquez	Romeo Caicedo	Juan Salazar	2	—N/a
1988	"Juan Cansino"	Ketty Pazmiño	Ramiro Montalvo	Ramiro Montalvo	14	0
1989	"Mi campesina"	Hermanos Miño Naranjo	Luis Padilla Guevara		—N/a	
1990	"Por amor al arte"	Patricio López	Jimmy Arias	Iván Castro	—N/a	
1991	"Para escribir una canción"	Juan Carlos Córdova	Wálter Abril; Jimmy Árias	Richard Anton	SF	—N/a
1992	"Una canción para dos mundos"	Jesús Fichamba	Luis Padilla Guevara		—N/a	
1993	"Él tiene razón"	Pericles	Pablo Noboa	Fredy Moreno	—N/a	
1994	"Temporada baja"	Felipe y Francisco Terán (Contravía)	Francisco Terán		7	6
1995	"Mira"	Tierrabuena	Fernando Proaño	Claudio Jácome Harb	—N/a	
1996	"Y vuela"	Aldo y Gianny Salvador	Alberto Caleris	Claudio Jácome Harb	—N/a	
1997	"Te quiero"	Luis Caicedo		Claudio Jácome Harb	SF	—N/a
1998	"Fíjate"	Fabricio Espinoza	Jorge Mahuad; Miguel Mora	Rolando Valladares	SF	—N/a
1999	Contest cancelled ◇					
2000	"Canto por ti, por amor"	Danilo Fernando Rosero Murillo	Gustavo Maruri Cedeño; Roy Gabriel Maruri Salazar		SF	—N/a

== Hosting ==
Year	City	Venue	Hosts	Ref.
1996	Quito	Teatro Nacional, Casa de la Cultura Ecuatoriana	Christian Johnson; Ximena Aulestia	
