= Guatemala in the OTI Festival =

- OTI Festival
- Participating broadcaster: Televisiete

Participation summary
- Appearances: 25
- First appearance: 1974
- Last appearance: 2000
- Highest placement: 2nd in 1974
- Participation history: 1974; 1975; 1976; 1977; 1978; 1979; 1980; 1981; 1982; 1983; 1984; 1985; 1986; 1987; 1988; 1989; 1990; 1991; 1992; 1993; 1994; 1995; 1996; 1997; 1998; 2000

The participation of Guatemala in the OTI Festival began at the third OTI Festival in 1974. The Guatemalan participating broadcaster was Televisiete, which was member of the Organización de Televisión Iberoamericana (OTI). It participated in twenty-five editions after its debut, only missing the 1978 festival. Its best result was second achieved in 1974.

The participation of Ricardo Arjona, who represented Guatemala in 1988, is of particular note. Although he only managed to get 12th place, he rose quickly to stardom.

== History ==
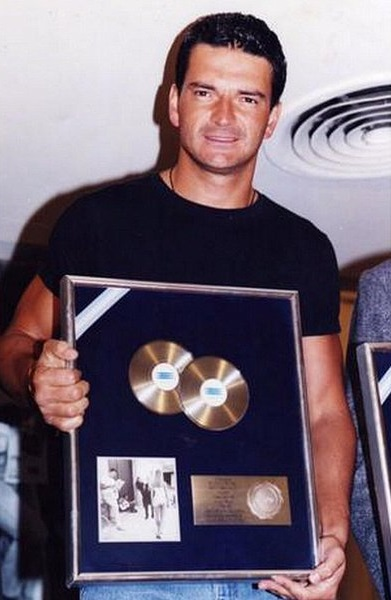
Ricardo Arjona (pictured in 1998) placed 12th in 1988

Although Televisiete sent some well known names to the OTI Festival, it had a lusterless trajectory in the festival. It never managed to win the festival, and only placed second in 1974, in its debut entry. It managed to reach the top 10 again in 1976 and in 1980. Since then, it got only moderate placings.

=== National Final ===
Following the example of the participating broadcasters in Mexico and Chile, Televisiete also created its own national selection process. The Guatemalan National OTI festival was celebrated every year in Guatemala City since the debut in the festival.

As the other broadcaster which organized a preselection, the winner act, who would represent the country in the festival was elected by a professional jury who voted for their favourite entries.

== Participation overview ==
Table key
2	Second place
F	Finalist
SF	Semi-finalist
◇	Contest cancelled

Year	Song	Artist	Songwriter(s)	Conductor	Place	Points
1974	"Yo soy"	Tanya Zea	Tanya Zea	Roberto Porter	2	14
1975	"Vivirás pensando en alguien más"	Mario Vides	Mario Vides	Roberto Porter	14	2
1976	"Que haré sin tí"	Hugo Leonel Baccaro			8	3
1977	"El verbo amar"	Mildred y Manolo	Julio César del Valle	Rafael Ibarbia	17	0
1978	Did not participate					
1979	"La mitad de mi naranja"	Luis Galich Porta and Pirámide	Luis Galich Porta	Vinicio Quezada	12	13
1980	"Suave y dulcemente"	Madrigal Band	Óscar Eduardo Conde	Vinicio Quesada	9	19
1981	"Estoy loco"	Sergio Iván	Hilda Cofiño		21	1
1982	"Víveme"	Sandra Patricia	Óscar Salazar	Óscar Salazar	15	8
1983	"Concierto"	Óscar Rolando Ortega	Óscar Rolando Ortega	Óscar Salazar	—N/a	
1984	"El gran final"	Julio Enrique	Óscar Salazar	Óscar Salazar	—N/a	
1985	"Escenario"	Gloria Marina	Víctor Manuel Porras; Gloria Marina	Eduardo Leiva	—N/a	
1986	"Amistad y esperanza"	Rodolfo Yela	Chaty Bosschini	Horacio Saavedra	—N/a	
1987	"Que Dios nos libre de la locura del hombre"	Chito Ordóñez	Chito Ordóñez	Fernando Correia Martins	—N/a	
1988	"Con una estrella en el vientre"	Ricardo Arjona	Ricardo Arjona	Vinicio Quezada	12	1
1989	"Traigo la voz"	Roberto Rey	Orlando Coronado		—N/a	
1990	"Es por demás"	Annaby	Miguel Amado; Luis Fernando Qujivix	Luis Fernando Qujivix	—N/a	
1991	"Yo quiero... yo puedo"	Sergio Iván	María Antonieta Gámez	Carlos Soto	SF	—N/a
1992	"De la mano"	Edgar David Ávalos	C. Recinos; V. Quezada		—N/a	
1993	"Niño, salva a tu mundo"	Mario Vides	Mario Vides; Judith Méndez	José Fabra	—N/a	
1994	"Sor Juana Inés y el ángel"	Noris	Álvaro R. Aguilar		SF	—N/a
1995	"Siéntelo"	Mario Mejía	Nelson Leal	Roberto Estrada	—N/a	
1996	"Para encontrar la paz"	Álvaro Aguilar	Álvaro Aguilar	Roberto Estrada	—N/a	
1997	"Inocencia perdida"	Francisco Calvillo	Fernando Scheel	Roberto Estrada	SF	—N/a
1998	"Sueño de smog"	Nelson Leal	Mario Vallar; Nelson Leal	Roberto Estrada	F	—N/a
1999	Contest cancelled ◇					
2000	"Luna serena"	Lico Vadelli	Fernando Scheel		SF	—N/a
