= Chile in the OTI Festival 1984 =

- OTI Festival 1984
- Participating broadcasters: Televisión Nacional de Chile (TVN); Corporación de Televisión de la Universidad Católica de Chile (UCTV); Corporación de Televisión de la Universidad de Chile (UTV)
- Country: Chile
- Selection process: National final
- Selection date: 12 October 1984

Competing entry
- Song: "Agualuna"
- Artist: Fernando Ubiergo
- Songwriter: Fernando Ubiergo

Placement
- Final result: 1st

Participation chronology
◄1983 •	1984	• 1985►

Chile was represented at the OTI Festival 1984 with the song "Agualuna", written and performed by Fernando Ubiergo. The Chilean participating broadcasters, Televisión Nacional de Chile (TVN), Corporación de Televisión de la Universidad Católica de Chile (UCTV), and Corporación de Televisión de la Universidad de Chile (UTV), jointly selected their entry through a televised national final. The song, that was performed in position 10, placed first out of 21 competing entries, winning the festival.

== National stage ==
Televisión Nacional de Chile (TVN), Corporación de Televisión de la Universidad Católica de Chile (UCTV), and Corporación de Televisión de la Universidad de Chile (UTV), held a national final jointly to select their entry for the 13th edition of the OTI Festival. Eight songs were shortlisted for the televised final, from the 114 received.

Competing entries on the national final – Chile 1984
Song	Artist	Songwriter(s)	Conductor
"Agualuna"	Fernando Ubiergo	Fernando Ubiergo	Pancho Aranda
"Cantemos mañana guitarra"	Miguel Piñera	María Gloria Garay	
"Déjame vivir"	Pachy Salgado	Francisco Vargas; Jaime de Aguirre	Edgardo Riquelme
"El bostezo de la paz"	Ricardo de la Fuente	Ricardo de la Fuente	
"Hombrecitos"	Juan Antonio Labra	Juan Antonio Labra; Héctor Cabrera	
"Lo que es el amor"	Jorge Caraccioli	Sergio Gormaz	Miguel Zabaleta
"Versos para un mañana"	Héctor Molina	Osvaldo Jeldres	
"Y nada más"	Soledad Guerrero	Scottie Scott	Carlos Grunwald

=== National final ===
The national final was held on Friday 12 October 1984, beginning at 21:30 CLST (00:30+1 UTC), at the Teatro Casino Las Vegas in Santiago, and was presented by Jorge Rencoret and Pamela Hodar. The show featured guest performances by the Antumapu ballet and Jorge Romero. It was staged by UTV, and broadcast on TVN's Canal 7, UCTV's Canal 13, and UTV's Canal 11.

The members of the jury, who voted secretly, were: Juan José Pellegrini, Jorge Pedreros, Maitén Montenegro, Vicente Bianchi, and Ricardo Miranda.

The winner was "Agualuna", written and performed by Fernando Ubiergo; with "Y nada más", written by Scottie Scott and performed by Soledad Guerrero, and "Lo que es el amor", written by Sergio Gormaz and performed by Jorge Caraccioli, both placing second.

Winner

Result of the national final – Chile 1984
R/O	Song	Artist	Result
	"Agualuna"	Fernando Ubiergo	1
	"Y nada más"	Soledad Guerrero	2
	"Lo que es el amor"	Jorge Caraccioli	2
	"El bostezo de la paz"	Ricardo de la Fuente	—N/a
	"Cantemos mañana guitarra"	Miguel Piñera	—N/a
	"Hombrecitos"	Juan Antonio Labra	—N/a
	"Déjame vivir"	Pachy Salgado	—N/a
	"Versos para un mañana"	Héctor Molina	—N/a

== At the OTI Festival ==
On 10 November 1984, the OTI Festival was held at the National Auditorium in Mexico City, Mexico, hosted by Televisa, and broadcast live throughout Ibero-America. Fernando Ubiergo performed "Agualuna" in position 10, with Pancho Aranda conducting the event's orchestra. The song received 27 points in the first round and advanced to the three-song superfinal, where it placed first winning the festival.

The festival was broadcast on TVN's Canal 7, UCTV's Canal 13, and UTV's Canal 11 on delay at 21:30 CLST (00:30+1 UTC).
