= Chile in the OTI Festival 1987 =

- OTI Festival 1987
- Participating broadcasters: Televisión Nacional de Chile (TVN); Corporación de Televisión de la Universidad Católica de Chile (UCTV); Corporación de Televisión de la Universidad de Chile (UTV)
- Country: Chile
- Selection process: National final
- Selection date: 12 September 1987

Competing entry
- Song: "Chocando paredes"
- Artist: Eduardo Valenzuela
- Songwriter: Eduardo Valenzuela

Placement
- Final result: Finalist

Participation chronology
◄1986 •	1987	• 1988►

Chile was represented at the OTI Festival 1987 with the song "Chocando paredes", written and performed by Eduardo Valenzuela. The Chilean participating broadcasters, Televisión Nacional de Chile (TVN), Corporación de Televisión de la Universidad Católica de Chile (UCTV), and Corporación de Televisión de la Universidad de Chile (UTV), jointly selected their entry through a televised national final. The song, that was performed in position 3, was not among the top-three places revealed.

== National stage ==
Televisión Nacional de Chile (TVN), Corporación de Televisión de la Universidad Católica de Chile (UCTV), and Corporación de Televisión de la Universidad de Chile (UTV), held a national final jointly to select their entry for the 16th edition of the OTI Festival. Eight songs were shortlisted for the televised final.

Competing entries on the national final – Chile 1987
Song	Artist	Songwriter(s)
"Ahora"	Mauricio Galleguillos	Fernando Wohlwend
"Aventuras"	Alejandro de Rosas	Scottie Scott
"Chocando paredes"	Eduardo Valenzuela	Eduardo Valenzuela
"Cuando están aquí"	Nino García	Nino García
"El amor siempre está"	Tatán	Sebastián Palacios
"Me llena de miedo"	Diego Luna	Héctor Acuña
"Mi niña se fue"	Juan Eduardo Fuentealba	Ignacio Loyola
"No fue mi culpa"	Patricia Frías	Reinaldo Tomás Martínez

=== National final ===
The national final was held on Saturday 12 September 1987, and was presented by Katherine Salosny and Pablo Aguilera. The show featured guest performances by ballet Huganzas, ballet Antu Mapu, Pancho Puelma and Los Socios. It was staged by UTV at its studios, and was broadcast on TVN's Canal 7, UCTV's Canal 13, and UTV's Canal 11.

The jury was composed of Eduardo Domínguez representing UCTV, Justus Liebig representing UTV, Horacio Saavedra representing TVN, Franz Benko, and Jorge Rencoret. They voted their favourites entries between 1 and 7 points in order of preference.

The winner was "Chocando paredes", written and performed by Eduardo Valenzuela; with "Aventuras", written by Scottie Scott and performed by Alejandro de Rosas, placing second; and "No fue mi culpa", written by Reinaldo Tomás Martínez and performed by Patricia Frías, placing third.

Winner

Result of the national final – Chile 1987
R/O	Song	Artist	Result
1	"Cuando están aquí"	Nino García	—N/a
2	"Aventuras"	Alejandro de Rosas	2
3	"No fue mi culpa"	Patricia Frías	3
4	"Mi niña se fue"	Juan Eduardo Fuentealba	—N/a
5	"Ahora"	Mauricio Galleguillos	—N/a
6	"Chocando paredes"	Eduardo Valenzuela	1
7	"El amor siempre está"	Tatán	—N/a
8	"Me llena de miedo"	Diego Luna	—N/a

== At the OTI Festival ==
On 24 October 1987, the OTI Festival was held at Teatro São Luiz in Lisbon, Portugal, hosted by Radiotelevisão Portuguesa (RTP), and broadcast live throughout Ibero-America. Eduardo Valenzuela performed "Chocando paredes" in position 3, with Francisco Larraín conducting the event's orchestra. The song was not among the top-three places revealed.

The festival was broadcast on delay at 21:30 CLST (00:30+1 UTC) on TVN's Canal 7, UCTV's Canal 13, and UTV's Canal 11.
