= Chile in the OTI Festival 1988 =

- OTI Festival 1988
- Participating broadcasters: Televisión Nacional de Chile (TVN); Corporación de Televisión de la Universidad Católica de Chile (UCTV); Corporación de Televisión de la Universidad de Chile (UTV)
- Country: Chile
- Selection process: National final
- Selection date: 15 October 1988

Competing entry
- Song: "Es mi libertad"
- Artist: Cecilia Castro
- Songwriters: Loreto Valenzuela Baudrand; Alfredo Sauvalle

Placement
- Final result: 7th, 6 points

Participation chronology
◄1987 •	1988	• 1989►

Chile was represented at the OTI Festival 1988 with the song "Es mi libertad", written by Loreto Valenzuela Baudrand and Alfredo Sauvalle, and performed by Cecilia Castro. The Chilean participating broadcasters, Televisión Nacional de Chile (TVN), Corporación de Televisión de la Universidad Católica de Chile (UCTV), and Corporación de Televisión de la Universidad de Chile (UTV), jointly selected their entry through a televised national final. The song, that was performed in position 13, placed seventh out of 22 competing entries, tying with the songs from Colombia and Portugal with 6 points.

== National stage ==
Televisión Nacional de Chile (TVN), Corporación de Televisión de la Universidad Católica de Chile (UCTV), and Corporación de Televisión de la Universidad de Chile (UTV), held a national final jointly to select their entry for the 17th edition of the OTI Festival. Eight songs were shortlisted for the televised final, out of the 130 received.

Competing entries on the national final – Chile 1988
Song	Artist	Songwriter(s)
"Te quiero en mi voz"	Humberto Onetto	Humberto Onetto
"La vida, un duro juego"	Pedro Alejandro Torres	Pedro Alejandro Torres Escobar
"Es mi libertad"	Cecilia Castro	Loreto Valenzuela Baudrand; Alfredo Sauvalle
"Para vivir en paz"	Ivette Vergara	Marco Antonio Contreras
"Un mundo intangible"	Grupo Cien	Alejandro Gaete Aguirre
"Tiene algo especial"	Santiago Retti	Carlos González Escalante
"Dónde está el amor"	Rodolfo Navech	Luis Riderelli; Ronaldo Knoller
"Ay amor, bendito amor"	Norman Ilic	Ricardo de la Fuente

=== National final ===
The national final was held on Saturday 15 October 1988, beginning at 21:30 CLST (00:30+1 UTC), and was presented by Andrea Tessa and Bastián Bodenhöfer. The musical director was Miguel Pizarro, who conducted the orchestra. It was staged by UCTV at its Studio 3, and was broadcast on TVN's Canal 7, UCTV's Canal 13, and UTV's Canal 11.

The jury consisted of seven members: Antonio Vodanovic and Horacio Saavedra representing TVN, Pablo Aguilera and Marcelo Bley representing UTV, Gonzalo Bertrán and Janette Frazier representing UCTV, and Malú Gatica representing the OTI executive committee.

The winner was "Es mi libertad", written by Loreto Valenzuela Baudrand and Alfredo Sauvalle, and performed by Cecilia Castro; with "La vida, un duro juego", written and performed by Pedro Alejandro Torres, placing second; and "Tiene algo especial", written by Carlos González Escalante, and performed by Santiago Retti, placing third. The first prize was endowed with a monetary amount of CLP$400,000, the second prize of CLP$250,000, and the third prize of CLP$200,000

Winner

Result of the national final – Chile 1988
R/O	Song	Artist	Result
1	"Te quiero en mi voz"	Humberto Onetto	—N/a
2	"La vida, un duro juego"	Pedro Alejandro Torres	2
3	"Es mi libertad"	Cecilia Castro	1
4	"Para vivir en paz"	Ivette Vergara	—N/a
5	"Un mundo intangible"	Grupo Cien	—N/a
6	"Tiene algo especial"	Santiago Retti	3
7	"Dónde está el amor"	Rodolfo Navech	—N/a
8	"Ay amor, bendito amor"	Norman Ilic	—N/a

== At the OTI Festival ==
On 19 November 1988, the OTI Festival was held at the Teatro Nacional Cervantes in Buenos Aires, Argentina, hosted by Argentina Televisora Color (ATC), and broadcast live throughout Ibero-America. Cecilia Castro performed "Es mi libertad" in position 13, with Miguel Pizarro conducting the event's orchestra, and placing seventh out of 22 competing entries, tied with the songs from Colombia and Portugal with 6 points.

The festival was broadcast on TVN's Canal 7, UTV's Canal 11, and UCTV's Canal 13 on delay at 21:30 CLST (00:30+1 UTC), with commentary by Andrea Tessa, Juan Carlos Duque, and Pancho Aranda.
