= Chile in the OTI Festival 1983 =

- OTI Festival 1983
- Participating broadcasters: Televisión Nacional de Chile (TVN); Corporación de Televisión de la Universidad Católica de Chile (UCTV); Corporación de Televisión de la Universidad de Chile (UTV)
- Country: Chile
- Selection process: National final
- Selection date: 6 September 1983

Competing entry
- Song: "La misma vida, el mismo modo"
- Artist: Wildo
- Songwriter: Wildo

Placement
- Final result: Finalist

Participation chronology
◄1982 •	1983	• 1984►

Chile was represented at the OTI Festival 1983 with the song "La misma vida, el mismo modo", written and performed by Wildo. The Chilean participating broadcasters, Televisión Nacional de Chile (TVN), Corporación de Televisión de la Universidad Católica de Chile (UCTV), and Corporación de Televisión de la Universidad de Chile (UTV), jointly selected their entry through a televised national final. The song, that was performed in position 8, was not among the top-five places revealed.

== National stage ==
Televisión Nacional de Chile (TVN), Corporación de Televisión de la Universidad Católica de Chile (UCTV), and Corporación de Televisión de la Universidad de Chile (UTV), held a national final jointly to select their entry for the 12th edition of the OTI Festival. Nine songs were shortlisted for the televised final, from the 250 received, by a committee composed of: Ricardo Miranda and Eduardo Domínguez from UCTV, Miguel Zabaleta from UTV, Luis Urquidi from TVN, and Carlos Humeres from the Chilean OTI commission. The songs were announced on 27 July 1983.

Competing entries on the national final – Chile 1983
Song	Artist	Songwriter(s)
"3-2-1-0 adiós"	Osvaldo Leiva	Osvaldo Leiva
"A los que me sienten"	Humberto Onetto	Humberto Onetto
"Adolescente ilusión"	Ricardo Fuentealba	Ricardo Fuentealba
"La misma vida, el mismo modo"	Wildo	Wildo
"Por nostalgia volveré"	Juan Antonio Labra	Juan Antonio Labra
"Por nuestra reconciliación"	Nino García	Nino García
"Tanto amor"	Gloria Simonetti	María Angélica Ramírez
"Y el tiempo no pasó"	Claudia Muñoz	Francisco Aranda; Hernán Rodt
"Yo te creí"	Antonio Zabaleta	Antonio Zabaleta

The music videos for the songs were recorded at Filmocentro studios and broadcast by TVN's Canal 7, UCTV's Canal 13, and UTV's Canal 11 at different time slots, with three different songs being broadcast each week in the weeks leading up to the national final.

=== National final ===
The national final was held on Tuesday 30 August 1983, and was presented by Paulina Nin. It was staged by TVN at its studios. The initial plan was for the show to be recorded in the afternoon to be broadcast that same evening; however, during the recording, they were notified that the broadcast was going to be postponed due to the national mourning declared after the assassination of Carol Urzúa. To prevent the name of the winning song from being revealed, the jurors cast their votes in sealed envelopes. On Tuesday 6 September 1983, the envelopes were opened, the awards ceremony was recorded, and the full show was broadcast on TVN's Canal 7, UCTV's Canal 13, and UTV's Canal 11 beginning at 21:30 CLT (01:30+1 UTC).

The winner was "La misma vida, el mismo modo", written and performed by Wildo; with "Yo te creí", written and performed by Antonio Zabaleta, placing second; and "3-2-1-0 adiós" written and performed by Osvaldo Leiva placing third. The first prize was endowed with a monetary amount of CLP$200,000, the second prize of CLP$120,000, and the third prize of CLP$80,000.

Winner

Result of the national final – Chile 1983
R/O	Song	Artist	Points	Result
1	"Tanto amor"	Gloria Simonetti	—N/a	
2	"Por nostalgia volveré"	Juan Antonio Labra	—N/a	
3	"Yo te creí"	Antonio Zabaleta	30	2
4	"Y el tiempo no pasó"	Claudia Muñoz	—N/a	
5	"La misma vida, el mismo modo"	Wildo	33	1
6	"3-2-1-0 adiós"	Osvaldo Leiva	26	3
7	"A los que me sienten"	Humberto Onetto	—N/a	
8	"Adolescente ilusión"	Ricardo Fuentealba	—N/a	
9	"Por nuestra reconciliación"	Nino García	—N/a	

== At the OTI Festival ==
On 29 October 1983, the OTI Festival was held at the DAR Constitution Hall in Washington, D.C., United States, hosted by Spanish International Network (SIN), and broadcast live throughout Ibero-America. Wildo performed "La misma vida, el mismo modo" in position 8, with Francisco Aranda conducting the event's orchestra. At the end, only the top five places were announced, and the Chilean entry was not one of them.

The festival was broadcast on TVN's Canal 7, UCTV's Canal 13, and UTV's Canal 11 on delay at 21:30 CLST (00:30+1 UTC).

=== Voting ===
Each participating broadcaster, or group of broadcasters that jointly participated representing a country, appointed a juror who secretly scored each entry in a scale of 5–1 points, except for the entry representing its own country. The Chilean juror was Antonio Vodanovic.
