= Cheo Zorrilla =

Dominican composer (1950–2025)

- Born: Eliseo Zorrilla Gómez; 17 February 1950; Tamayo (Bahoruco), Dominican Republic
- Died: 8 June 2025 (aged 75)
- Occupations: Singer; songwriter

Eliseo Zorrilla Gómez (17 February 1950 – 8 June 2025), better known as Cheo Zorrilla, was a Dominican composer, trumpet player, and singer.

== Life and career ==
Zorrilla was born on 17 February 1950 in Tamayo, Bahoruco province. He is considered one of the Dominican composers most recorded by international artists. Some of his best-known songs are: "Apocalipsis", "Al nacer cada enero", and "Con las alas rotas".

In 2016 Zorrilla was inducted into the Latin Songwriters Hall of Fame in Miami.

Zorrilla died on 8 June 2025, at the age of 75.

== At the OTI Festival ==
Zorrilla represented the Dominican Republic in the OTI Festival twice as singer and five times as songwriter. He also represented Puerto Rico once as songwriter.

Participations in the OTI festival
Year	Country	Song	Performer	Songwriter	Result
1977	Dominican Republic	"Al nacer cada enero"	Fernando Casado	Cheo Zorrilla	2nd
1982	Puerto Rico	"Sin tu música"	Lunna	Cheo Zorrilla; Ángel Peña Berdiel	18th
1983	Dominican Republic	"Olvidar, olvidar"	Taty Salas	Cheo Zorrilla	2nd
1985	Dominican Republic	"Con las alas rotas"	Gina D'Alessandro	Cheo Zorrilla	Finalist
1986	Dominican Republic	"Sol de la noche"	Cheo Zorrilla	Cheo Zorrilla	Finalist
1992	Dominican Republic	"A su tiempo"	Cheo Zorrilla	Cheo Zorrilla; Manuel Tejada	Finalist
