= United States in the OTI Festival 1985 =

- OTI Festival 1985
- Participating broadcaster: Spanish International Network (SIN)
- Country: United States
- Selection process: VIII Festival Nacional de la Canción SIN – Camino a la OTI
- Selection date: 24 August 1985

Competing entry
- Song: "Te canto de mi raza"
- Artist: Zobeida and Frank
- Songwriters: Frank López Varona; María Teresa López

Placement
- Final result: Finalist

Participation chronology
◄1984 •	1985	• 1986►

The United States was represented at the OTI Festival 1985 with the song "Te canto de mi raza", written by Frank López Varona and María Teresa López and performed by themselves as Zobeida and Frank. The participating broadcaster representing the country, the Spanish International Network (SIN), selected its entry through a national televised competition. The song, that was performed in position 5, was not among the top-three places revealed.

== National stage ==
The Spanish International Network (SIN) held a national televised competition to select its entry for the 14th edition of the OTI Festival. This was the eighth edition of the Festival Nacional de la Canción SIN – Camino a la OTI. In the final, each song represented a SIN affiliate, each of which had selected its entry through a local pre-selection.

=== San Antonio pre-selection ===
On Wednesday 17 July 1985, KWEX-TV held a televised pre-selection at the Lila Cockrell Theatre in San Antonio, beginning at 20:00 CDT (01:00+1 UTC). This edition of the San Antonio Local OTI Festival featured ten songs. It was broadcast on Channel 41 on Saturday 20 July, beginning at 19:00 CDT (00:00+1 UTC).

The winner, and therefore qualified for the national final, was "¿Dónde estás?", written by Efraín Sánchez Palacios, and performed by Noé Pro; with "La respuesta", written and performed by Sergio Ruiz, placing second; and "Con un poco de amor", written by Ricardo Flores and performed by Gloria Regil, placing third.

Qualifier

Result of the Local OTI Festival – San Antonio 1985
R/O	Song	Artist	Songwriter(s)	Result
1	"Al poeta"	Jonathan	José Villareal García	—N/a
2	"Pajarilla"	Cecilia Noel	David Cooper	—N/a
3	"Por ella"	Jerry Quintero	Jerry Quintero	—N/a
4	"Este loco corazón"	Aixa	Miguel Nacel	—N/a
5	"Amigo mío"	Fey Libertad	Alberto Ruiz	—N/a
6	"Con un poco de amor"	Gloria Regil	Ricardo Flores	3
7	"La respuesta"	Sergio Ruiz	Sergio Ruiz	2
8	"¿Dónde estás?"	Noé Pro	Efraín Sánchez Palacios	Qualified
9	"Busquemos latinos"	Luis Julián	Luis Horacio Silva	—N/a
10	"No sé por qué"	Pablo Robles	Jesús Z. González	—N/a

=== Los Angeles pre-selection ===
On Sunday 21 July 1985, KMEX-TV held a televised pre-selection at the Cocoanut Grove of the Ambassador Hotel in Los Angeles, beginning at 20:00 PDT (03:00+1 UTC). This seventh edition of the Los Angeles Local OTI Festival featured eight songs, shortlisted from the 400 received. It was presented by Manuel López Ochoa and María Elena Salinas, and was broadcast live on Channel 34. The show featured guest performances by Danny Rivera and María Conchita Alonso.

The jury was composed of Teddy Fregoso, Albert Hammond, Marisela, Guadalupe Pineda, and Pepe Peña as chairperson. The jurors scored each song between 1 and 5 points.

The winner, and therefore qualified for the national final, was "Regálame un minuto", written by Bob Cisneros and performed by Memo Valdés; with "Patria de amor", written by Erick Bulling and performed by Ari Vivavoz, placing second; and "Cuídate", written by Antonio de Marco and Moki de Marco and performed by Sara González, placing third.

Result of the Local OTI Festival – Los Angeles 1985
R/O	Song	Artist	Songwriter(s)	Result
1	"Hijo de tierra"	Martín Roca	Juan Carlos Ochoa	—N/a
2	"Qué hiciste de mí"	Jovany	Elvira Cristal	—N/a
3	"Patria de amor"	Ari Vivavoz	Erick Bulling	2
4	"Alguien vendrá"	Elia Alvarado	Armando Noriega	—N/a
5	"El cielo o el infierno"	Melón	Memo de Anda	—N/a
6	"Algún día"	Alex Enamorado	Alex Enamorado	—N/a
7	"Regálame un minuto"	Memo Valdés	Bob Cisneros	Qualified
8	"Cuídate"	Sara González	Antonio de Marco; Moki de Marco	3

=== El Paso pre-selection ===
On Saturday 10 August 1985, KINT-TV held a televised pre-selection at the El Paso Civic Center in El Paso. This first edition of the El Paso Local OTI Festival featured eight songs. It was broadcast on Channel 26 on Sunday 11 August, beginning at 20:00 MDT (02:00+1 UTC). The show featured guest performances by Jacqueline Fournier, Alberto Ruiz, and Oskar.

The winner, and therefore qualified for the national final, was "La verdad es la verdad", written and performed by Luis Chávez; with "Soñar, soñar, soñado", written by Enrique Izquieta and performed by Tony Solo, placing second; and "Tierra buena", written and performed by Gustavo Munguía, placing third.

Result of the Local OTI Festival – El Paso 1985 (Note: Incomplete list of the competing entries.)
R/O	Song	Artist	Songwriter(s)	Result
	"La verdad es la verdad"	Luis Chávez	Luis Chávez	Qualified
	"Soñar, soñar, soñado"	Tony Solo	Enrique Izquieta	2
	"Tierra buena"	Gustavo Munguía	Gustavo Munguía	3

=== Tampa pre-selection ===
W50AC held an internal pre-selection. The song selected for the national final was written by Antonio Eduardo López and performed by Gaby Gabriel.

=== Final ===
The final was held on Saturday 24 August 1985 at the James L. Knight Center in Miami. It was broadcast live on all SIN affiliates. The winner was "Te canto de mi raza", written by Frank López Varona and María Teresa López and performed by themselves as Zobeida and Frank; with "Regálame un minuto" representing KMEX-TV–Los Angeles, written by Bob Cisneros and performed by Memo Valdés, placing second. The festival ended with a reprise of the winning entry.

Winner

Result of the final of the VIII Festival Nacional de la Canción SIN – Camino a la OTI
R/O	Song	Artist	Affiliate	Result
	"Te canto de mi raza"	Zobeida and Frank		1
	"¿Dónde estás?"	Noé Pro	KWEX-TV–San Antonio	
	"Regálame un minuto"	Memo Valdés	KMEX-TV–Los Angeles	2
		Gaby Gabriel	W50AC–Tampa	
	"La verdad es la verdad"	Luis Chávez	KINT-TV–El Paso	

== At the OTI Festival ==
On 21 September 1985, the OTI Festival was held at Teatro Lope de Vega in Seville, Spain, hosted by Televisión Española, and broadcast live throughout Ibero-America. Zobeida and Frank performed "Te canto de mi raza" in position 5, with Héctor Garrido conducting the event's orchestra. The song was not among the top-three places revealed.
