= Paraguay in the OTI Festival =

- OTI Festival
- Participating broadcaster: Teledifusora Paraguaya

Participation summary
- Appearances: 21
- First appearance: 1978
- Last appearance: 2000
- Highest placement: 2nd in 1988
- Host: 1995
- Participation history: 1978; 1979; 1980; 1981; 1982; 1983; 1984; 1985; 1986; 1987; 1988; 1989; 1990; 1991; 1992; 1993; 1994; 1995; 1996; 1997; 1998; 2000

The participation of Paraguay in the OTI Festival began at the seventh OTI Festival in 1978. The Paraguayan participating broadcaster was Teledifusora Paraguaya, which was member of the Organización de Televisión Iberoamericana (OTI). After its debut, it participated for twenty-one editions, only missing the 1982 festival. Its best result in the festival was second achieved in 1988; and it hosted the event in 1995.

== History ==
Just like most of the participating in the OTI Festival, Teledifusora Paraguaya selected all its entries internally. Its first entry in the festival was "Cantando" by veteran Rolando Percy, who got a disappointing 18th place with zero points. The same singer would return to the event in 1990 and 1995 with disappointing placings. The Paraguayan participation in the festival was not very successful, but in 1981, it reached the top 10 for first time with "Vos y yo seremos todos" by Alberto de Luque which placed 8th.

After a withdrawal in 1982, the next year it recorded one of its most successful entries with "Soñaremos como ayer" by the folk singer Marco de Brix which placed fourth. The same singer, five years later, returned to the event in 1988 with his song "Un mundo diferente" which was even more successful than his previous entry achieving second place with 25 points. Since then, it never managed to reach the top 10 again.

== Participation overview ==
Table key
2	Second place
F	Finalist
SF	Semi-finalist
◇	Contest cancelled

Year	Song	Artist	Songwriter(s)	Conductor	Place	Points
1978	"Cantando"	Rolando Percy	Maneco Galeano; Jorge Krauch	Juan Azúa	18	0
1979	"La vida en mi canción"	Derlis Esteche	Derlis Esteche	Oscar Cardozo Ocampo	16	4
1980	"La razón que nos une"	Carlos Albospino	Antonio Medina	Oscar Cardozo Ocampo	17	7
1981	"Vos y yo seremos todos"	Alberto de Luque	Alberto de Luque; Humberto Rubín		8	15
1982	Did not participate					
1983	"Soñaremos como ayer"	Marco de Brix	Antonio Medina Boselli	Héctor Garrido	Top-5	—N/a
1984	"Una gaviota sobre el mar"	Valencia	Casto Darío	Casto Darío	—N/a	
1985	"A veces quiero ser"	Lizza Bogado	Lizza Bogado; Mario Casartelli; Augusto Barreto	Eduardo Leiva	—N/a	
1986	"Papá"	Rocío Cristal	Rocío Cristal; Casto Darío Martínez	Casto Darío Martínez	—N/a	
1987	"Procura"	Rolando Ojeda	Ricardo "Pilo" Lloret	Fernando Correia Martins	—N/a	
1988	"Un mundo diferente"	Marco de Brix	Antonio Medina Boselli	Oscar Cardozo Ocampo	2	25
1989	"Como aquellas nubes"	Rodolfo González Friedman	Ricardo "Pilo" Lloret		—N/a	
1990	"Hacedme soñar con la paz"	Rolando Percy	Rolando Percy	William Sánchez	—N/a	
1991	"Hoy ha vuelto el amor"	Adrián Barreto	Adrián Barreto	Chucho Ferrer	SF	—N/a
1992	"Un amanecer, una canción"	Óscar Benito			—N/a	
1993	"Señora mía"	Danny Durán	Danny Durán; Rolando Percy	Willy Suchard	—N/a	
1994	"Tierra herida"	Cristina Vera Díaz	Belisario; Cristina Vera; R.A. Bucak		SF	—N/a
1995	"Por siempre América"	Rolando Percy	Rolando Percy; Jorge Villalba	Palito Miranda	—N/a	
1996	"Por ti mujer"	Jorge Castro	Alberto Aguilera	Mauricio Cardozo Ocampo	—N/a	
1997	"Las cuentas claras"	Cecilia Kunert	Augusto Barreto	Oscar Cardozo Ocampo	F	—N/a
1998	"No lo digas"	Americanta	Victor Hugo Echeverría; Zuny Ramos; Walter García	Álvaro Esquivel	SF	—N/a
1999	Contest cancelled ◇					
2000	"Empiezo a vivir"	Lenys Paredes	Lenys Paredes		SF	—N/a

== Hosting ==
Year	City	Venue	Hosts	Ref.
1995	San Bernardino	Anfiteatro José Asunción Flores	Menchi Barriocanal; Rubén Rodríguez	
