= OTI Festival 1986 =

15th OTI Song Festival

Date and venue
- Final: 15 November 1986
- Venue: Municipal Theatre; Santiago, Chile

Organization
- Organizer: Organización de Televisión Iberoamericana (OTI)
- Supervisor: Darío de la Peña

Production
- Host broadcaster: Televisión Nacional de Chile (TVN); Corporación de Televisión de la Universidad Católica de Chile (UCTV); Corporación de Televisión de la Universidad de Chile (UTV)
- Director: Gonzalo Bertrán
- Musical director: Horacio Saavedra
- Presenters: Pamela Hodar; César Antonio Santis

Participants
- Number of entries: 20
- Debuting countries: Canada
- Returning countries: Bolivia
- Non-returning countries: Netherlands Antilles; Nicaragua; Spain
- Participation map: Participating countries Countries that participated in the past but not in 1986

Vote
- Voting system: Each member of a single jury awards 5–1 points to its five favourite songs in a secret vote
- Winning song: United States "Todos"

The OTI Festival 1986 (Spanish: Decimoquinto Gran Premio de la Canción Iberoamericana, Portuguese: Décimo Quinto Grande Prêmio da Canção Ibero-Americana) was the 15th edition of the OTI Festival, held on 15 November 1986 at the Municipal Theatre in Santiago, Chile, and presented by Pamela Hodar and César Antonio Santis. It was organised by the Organización de Televisión Iberoamericana (OTI) and host broadcasters Televisión Nacional de Chile (TVN), Corporación de Televisión de la Universidad Católica de Chile (UCTV), and Corporación de Televisión de la Universidad de Chile (UTV).

Broadcasters from twenty countries participated in the festival. The winner was the song "Todos", written by Vilma Planas, and performed by Dámaris Carbaugh, Miguel Ángel Guerra, and Eduardo Fabián representing the United States; with "De color de rosa", written and performed by Sylvia Tapia under her stage name Prisma representing Mexico, placing second; and "A ti no te ha dicho", written by Pedro Favini and Mono Flores, and performed by Hugo Marcel representing Argentina, placing third.

The lead-up to the contest was met with controversy over calls for a boycott because it would being held under a military dictatorship. These came mainly from Spain, which did not participate for the first and only time in the history of the festival. The event itself was impacted by a power outage that affected major cities across the country and halted local broadcasting due to a bomb attack on a power tower.

== Location ==
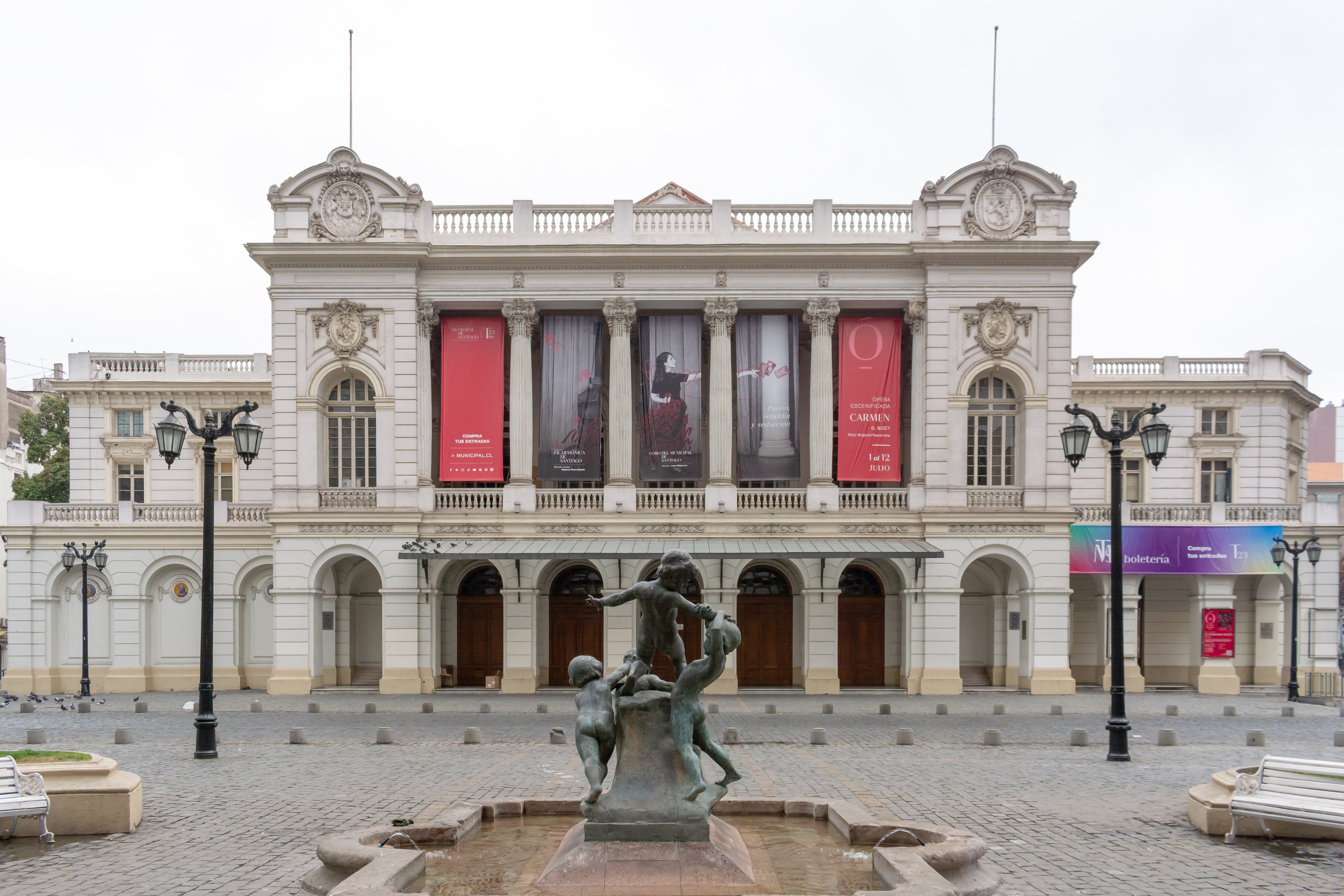
Municipal Theatre, Santiago – host venue of the OTI Festival 1986.

The Organización de Televisión Iberoamericana (OTI) designated Televisión Nacional de Chile (TVN), Corporación de Televisión de la Universidad Católica de Chile (UCTV), and Corporación de Televisión de la Universidad de Chile (UTV), as the joint host broadcasters for the 15th edition of the OTI Festival. The broadcasters, who collectively presented themselves as La televisión chilena, staged the event in Santiago. The venue selected was the Municipal Theatre, which is the most important stage theatre and opera house in the country. It was opened in 1857 and was designed by Claudio Brunet des Baines. The theatre had already hosted the OTI Festival 1978.

Throughout the week prior to the festival, conferences and seminars were held at Hotel Carrera. On 14 November 1986, the participating delegations took a sightseeing tour visiting Santiago during the day, and attended a party at Hotel Carrera, hosted by the Paraguayan Embassy, in the evening.

== Participants ==
Broadcasters from twenty countries participated in this edition of the OTI festival. The OTI members, public or private broadcasters from Portugal and nineteen Spanish and Portuguese speaking countries of Ibero-America signed up for the festival. Canada participated for the first time and Bolivia returned after having missed the festival since 1983. From the countries that participated in the previous edition, Netherlands Antilles, Nicaragua, and Spain did not return.

Some of the participating broadcasters, such as those representing Chile, El Salvador, Mexico, Panama, and the United States, selected their entries through their regular national televised competitions. Other broadcasters decided to select their entry internally.

Participants of the OTI Festival 1986
Country	Broadcaster(s)	Song	Artist	Songwriter(s)	Language	Conductor
Argentina		"A ti no te ha dicho"	Hugo Marcel	Pedro Favini; Mono Flores	Spanish	Mike Ribas
Bolivia		"Para tocar lo más profundo"	Carlos Alejandro	Carlos Alejandro Suárez	Spanish	Javier Jorquera
Canada	CFMT-TV	"Vamos a la fiesta"	Ricky Campbell	Ricky Campbell	Spanish	Horacio Saavedra
Chile	TVN; UCTV; UTV	"Desde las nubes"	Pancho Puelma	Pancho Puelma	Spanish	Pancho Aranda
Colombia		"Ausencia"	Noemí	Alfonso de la Estriella	Spanish	Carlos Montoya
Costa Rica	Teletica	"Bendito seas, varón"	Cristina Gutiérrez	Rodolfo Morales	Spanish	Carlos Guzmán
Dominican Republic		"Sol de la noche"	Cheo Zorrilla	Cheo Zorrilla	Spanish	Horacio Saavedra
Ecuador		"Pobres niños, pobre mundo"	Tannia López	Jimmy Arias	Spanish	Richard Anton
El Salvador	TCS	"Pensalo dos veces, Martín"	Jaime Turich	Daniel Rucks	Spanish	Mario Zúñiga
Guatemala		"Amistad y esperanza"	Rodolfo Yela	Chaty Bosschini	Spanish	Horacio Saavedra
Honduras		"Soy como soy"	Víctor Donayre	Víctor Donayre	Spanish	Víctor Durán
Mexico	Televisa	"De color de rosa"	Prisma	Sylvia Tapia	Spanish	Julio Jaramillo
Panama	RPC-TV	"Quizás no es el momento"	Paulette	Paulette Thomas	Spanish	Cristobal Muñoz
Paraguay		"Papá"	Rocío Cristal	Rocío Cristal; Casto Darío Martínez	Spanish	Casto Darío Martínez
Peru		"Aprenderé"	Francesco Petrozzi	José Ugas La Rosa; Juan Miguel Salas	Spanish	Horacio Saavedra
Portugal	RTP	"Adeus à praia"	Carlos Pedro	Rosa Lobato de Faria; Thilo Krasmann	Portuguese	Thilo Krasmann
Puerto Rico	Canal 2 Telemundo	"Tú y yo solos, nadie más"	Maggy	Pijuán	Spanish	Pijuán
United States	SIN	"Todos"	Dámaris Carbaugh, Miguel Ángel Guerra, and Eduardo Fabián	Vilma Planas	Spanish	Juan Salazar
Uruguay	Sociedad Televisora Larrañaga	"Somos valientes"	Miguel Ángel Montiel	Miguel Ángel Montiel	Spanish	Julio Frade
Venezuela		"Un nuevo amanecer"	Nilda López	Luis Cruz	Spanish	Horacio Saavedra

== Festival overview ==
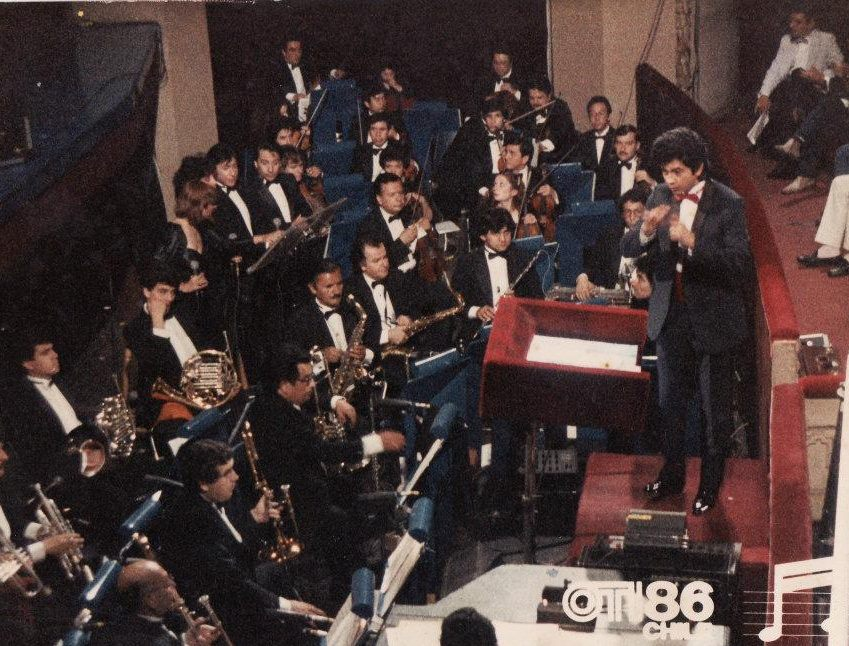
Mario Zúñiga conducting the festival orchestra for El Salvador.

The festival was held on Saturday 15 November 1986, beginning at 20:30 CLST (23:30 UTC). It was presented by Pamela Hodar and César Antonio Santis. The musical director was Horacio Saavedra, who conducted the 40-piece orchestra when required. Between the participating songs and during the interval act, fragments of the musical comedy La pérgola de las flores were performed.

The winner was the song "Todos", written by Vilma Planas, and performed by Dámaris Carbaugh, Miguel Ángel Guerra, and Eduardo Fabián representing the United States; with "De color de rosa", written and performed by Sylvia Tapia under her stage name Prisma representing Mexico, placing second; and "A ti no te ha dicho", written by Pedro Favini and Mono Flores, and performed by Hugo Marcel representing Argentina, placing third. Each of these entries received two trophies, one for the songwriters and one for the performer. The first prize trophies were delivered by Nicanor González, president of the OTI programs committee; the second prize trophies by Carlos Bombal, mayor of Santiago Centro; and the third prize trophies by Alfredo Escobar, vice-president of the OTI programs committee. The festival ended with a reprise of the winning entry.

Winner

Results of the OTI Festival 1987
R/O	Country	Song	Artist	Place
1	Mexico	"De color de rosa"	Prisma	2
2	Costa Rica	"Bendito seas, varón"	Cristina Gutiérrez	—N/a
3	Peru	"Aprenderé"	Francesco Petrozzi	—N/a
4	Paraguay	"Papá"	Rocío Cristal	—N/a
5	El Salvador	"Pensalo dos veces, Martín"	Jaime Turich	—N/a
6	Dominican Republic	"Sol de la noche"	Cheo Zorrilla	—N/a
7	Bolivia	"Para tocar lo más profundo"	Carlos Alejandro	—N/a
8	Colombia	"Ausencia"	Noemí	—N/a
9	Ecuador	"Pobres niños, pobre mundo"	Tannia López	—N/a
10	Chile	"Desde las nubes"	Pancho Puelma	—N/a
11	Argentina	"A ti no te ha dicho"	Hugo Marcel	3
12	Puerto Rico	"Tú y yo solos, nadie más"	Maggy	—N/a
13	Guatemala	"Amistad y esperanza"	Rodolfo Yela	—N/a
14	Panama	"Quizás no es el momento"	Paulette	—N/a
15	Portugal	"Adeus à praia"	Carlos Pedro	—N/a
16	Honduras	"Soy como soy"	Víctor Donayre	—N/a
17	Venezuela	"Un nuevo amanecer"	Nilda López	—N/a
18	United States	"Todos"	Dámaris Carbaugh, Miguel Ángel Guerra, and Eduardo Fabián	1
19	Uruguay	"Somos valientes"	Miguel Ángel Montiel	—N/a
20	Canada	"Vamos a la fiesta"	Ricky Campbell	—N/a

=== Jury ===
Each of the nine members of the single jury awarded 5–1 points to its five favourite songs in a secret vote. The voting was supervised by OTI representative Darío de la Peña. Only the top three places were revealed. The members of the jury were:

- Verónica Castro – actress
- Jimmy Osmond – singer
- Don Francisco – television presenter
- Gloria del Paraguay – singer
- Sandro – singer
- Betty Pino – radio presenter
- Antonio Prieto – singer
- Nydia Caro – singer, won the festival for Puerto Rico in 1974
- Manuela Furtado – head of international relations at Radiotelevisão Portuguesa

== Broadcast ==
The festival was broadcast in the 20 participating countries where the corresponding OTI member broadcasters relayed the contest through their networks after receiving it live via satellite. It was reported that it was additionally broadcast in other two countries.

Known details on the broadcasts of the festival in each country, including the specific broadcasting stations and commentators are shown in the tables below.

Broadcasters and commentators in participating countries
Country	Broadcaster	Channel(s)	Commentator(s)	Ref.
Canada	CFMT-TV (Note: Delayed broadcast at 22:00 EST (03:00+1 UTC))			
Chile	TVN	Canal 7	No commentary	
Chile	UTV	Canal 11	No commentary	
Chile	UCTV	Canal 13	No commentary	
Costa Rica	Telenac	Telenac Canal 2 (Note: Delayed broadcast at 19:45 CST (01:45+1 UTC))		
Costa Rica	Teletica	Canal 7		
Mexico	Televisa	Canal 2 (Note: Delayed broadcast at 18:30 CST (00:30+1 UTC))		
United States	SIN (Note: Delayed broadcast later that day by all SIN affiliates, each in their own time zone.)			

== Incidents and controversies ==
=== Calls for a boycott ===
Spain did not participate for the first and only time in the history of the festival. On 16 July 1986, Televisión Española (TVE) sent a telegram to OTI formalizing its withdrawal showing its rejection to the Military dictatorship of Chile. Ramón Criado, the director of TVE, called on all other OTI members to follow TVE's decision and not participate in the festival. This decision, which was taken under José María Calviño as the general director of the broadcaster, was reconsidered by Pilar Miró, the new general director who took office on 20 October, and tried to enter a song into the festival but was unsuccessful in such a short time.

The Venezuelan Radio and Television Workers' Union decided that none of its members would participate in the festival, in solidarity with Spain and in condemnation of the military regime. For this reason, singer Nilda López was expelled from the union after participating in the festival.

=== Power outage ===
Near the end of the performance of the competing entries, a power outage that affected most of the country impacted the venue. It not only affected the Santiago metropolitan area, but reportedly also other major cities in Chile, such as Valparaíso, Viña del Mar, and Concepción, where the television broadcast went down. The power outage was caused by a bomb attack on a power tower claimed by the Manuel Rodríguez Patriotic Front. Neither the festival itself nor its international broadcast were affected and continued as if nothing had happened.
