= Chile in the OTI Festival 1982 =

- OTI Festival 1982
- Participating broadcasters: Televisión Nacional de Chile (TVN); Corporación de Televisión de la Universidad Católica de Chile (UCTV); Corporación de Televisión de la Universidad de Chile (UTV)
- Country: Chile
- Selection process: National final
- Selection date: 18 October 1982

Competing entry
- Song: "Si no hubieras estado tú"
- Artist: Juan Pablo Méndez
- Songwriter: Juan Pablo Méndez

Placement
- Final result: 11th, 14 points

Participation chronology
| ◄1981 • | 1982 | • 1983► |

Chile was represented at the OTI Festival 1982 with the song "Si no hubieras estado tú", written and performed by Juan Pablo Méndez. The Chilean participating broadcasters, Televisión Nacional de Chile (TVN), Corporación de Televisión de la Universidad Católica de Chile (UCTV), and Corporación de Televisión de la Universidad de Chile (UTV), jointly selected their entry through a televised national final. The song, that was performed in position 5, placed eleventh out of 21 competing entries with 14 points.

== National stage ==
Televisión Nacional de Chile (TVN), Corporación de Televisión de la Universidad Católica de Chile (UCTV), and Corporación de Televisión de la Universidad de Chile (UTV), held a national final jointly to select their entry for the 11th edition of the OTI Festival. Eight songs were shortlisted for the televised final.

Competing entries on the national final – Chile 1982
| Song | Artist | Songwriter(s) |
|---|---|---|
| "Acto de amor" | Paz Ballara | Scottie Scott |
| "En otro mundo" | Gloria Simonetti | Jaime Atria Jr. |
| "No sé lo que me pasa" | Jaime Uauy | Lucy Mohor |
| "Pollito, sal de tu cascarón y ayuda a otro" | Florcita Motuda | Raúl Florcita Alarcón Rojas |
| "Pregúntale al amor" | Fernando Jiménez | Nano Acevedo |
| "Sé mujer" | Banda Metro | Banda Metro |
| "Si no hubieras estado tú" | Juan Pablo Méndez | Juan Pablo Méndez |
| "Soledad" | Patty Chávez | Ricardo de la Fuente |

=== National final ===
The national final was held on Monday 18 October 1982, beginning at 21:30 CLST (00:30+1 UTC), at the Omnium building in Las Condes, and was presented by José Alfredo Fuentes. It was staged by UCTV, and broadcast on TVN's Canal 7, UCTV's Canal 13, and UTV's Canal 11.

The members of the jury were: Carlos Humeres and Miguel Zabaleta representing UTV; and Mario Banderas and Luis Urquidi representing TVN. The audience vote was counted as a fifth member of the jury. The songs had been broadcast by TVN in evening-time slots during the previous weeks so that the public could vote for them by mail.

The winner was "Si no hubieras estado tú", written and performed by Juan Pablo Méndez; with "No sé lo que me pasa", written by Lucy Mohor and performed by Jaime Uauy, placing second; and "Acto de amor", written by Scottie Scott and performed Paz Ballara, placing third.

Winner

Result of the national final – Chile 1982
| R/O | Song | Artist | Result |
|---|---|---|---|
| 1 | "Soledad" | Patty Chávez | —N/a |
| 2 | "En otro mundo" | Gloria Simonetti | —N/a |
| 3 | "Si no hubieras estado tú" | Juan Pablo Méndez | 1 |
| 4 | "Pollito, sal de tu cascarón y ayuda a otro" | Florcita Motuda | —N/a |
| 5 | "Pregúntale al amor" | Fernando Jiménez | —N/a |
| 6 | "Sé mujer" | Banda Metro | —N/a |
| 7 | "No sé lo que me pasa" | Jaime Uauy | 2 |
| 8 | "Acto de amor" | Paz Ballara | 3 |

== At the OTI Festival ==
On 27 November 1982, the OTI Festival was held at the Coliseo Amauta in Lima, Peru, hosted by Panamericana Televisión, and broadcast live throughout Ibero-America. Juan Pablo Méndez performed "Si no hubieras estado tú" in position 5, with Francisco Aranda conducting the event's orchestra, and placing eleventh out of 21 competing entries with 14 points.

The festival was broadcast on TVN's Canal 7, UCTV's Canal 13, and UTV's Canal 11 on delay at 21:30 CLST (00:30+1 UTC).

=== Voting ===
Each participating broadcaster, or group of broadcasters that jointly participated representing a country, appointed a juror who awarded 5–1 points to their five favourite songs in order of preference. The Chilean juror was Lucho Gatica.

Points awarded to Chile
| Score | Country |
|---|---|
| 5 points | |
| 4 points | |
| 3 points | Brazil; Colombia; Ecuador |
| 2 points | Mexico; Peru |
| 1 point | United States |

Points awarded by Chile
| Score | Country |
|---|---|
| 5 points | Venezuela |
| 4 points | Mexico |
| 3 points | Dominican Republic |
| 2 points | United States |
| 1 point | Guatemala |
