= United States in the OTI Festival 1984 =

- OTI Festival 1984
- Participating broadcaster: Spanish International Network (SIN)
- Country: United States
- Selection process: National OTI–SIN Festival
- Selection date: 6 October 1984

Competing entry
- Song: "Señora mi madre"
- Artist: Alberto Ruiz
- Songwriter: Alberto Ruiz

Placement
- Final result: Finalist

Participation chronology
◄1983 •	1984	• 1985►

The United States was represented at the OTI Festival 1984 with the song "Señora mi madre", written and performed by Alberto Ruiz. The participating broadcaster representing the country, the Spanish International Network (SIN), selected its entry through a national televised competition. The song, that was performed in position 4, was not among the top-three places revealed.

== National stage ==
The Spanish International Network (SIN) held a national televised competition to select its entry for the 13th edition of the OTI Festival. This was the seventh edition of the National OTI–SIN Festival. In the final, each song represented a SIN affiliate, each of which had selected its entry through a local pre-selection.

=== Arizona pre-selection ===
On Saturday 25 August 1984, KTVW-TV held a televised pre-selection at the Palace West Theater in Phoenix, beginning at 19:00 MDT (01:00+1 UTC). This fourth edition of the Arizona OTI Festival featured 10 songs. It was broadcast on Channel 33, on Sunday 2 September, beginning at 20:00 MDT (02:00+1 UTC). The entries were accompanied by a nine-piece orchestra. The show featured a guest performance by Prisma.

Qualifier

Result of the Local OTI Festival – Arizona 1984 (Note: Incomplete list of the competing entries.)
R/O	Song	Artist	Songwriter(s)	Result
	"Apaga la luz"	Bobby Sol	Bobby Sol	
	"Y vas a ver"	Al Alabado	Al Alabado	

=== Los Angeles pre-selection ===
On Sunday 9 September 1984, KMEX-TV held a televised pre-selection at the auditorium of the East Los Angeles College in Los Angeles, beginning at 20:00 PDT (03:00+1 UTC). This sixth edition of the Los Angeles Local OTI Festival featured twelve songs, shortlisted from the 300 received. It was presented by María Medina and Eduardo Quezada, and broadcast live on Channel 34. The musical director was Harry Scorzo, who conducted the orchestra. The show featured guest performances by Medina, Humberto Cravioto, Chévere Internacional, Mariachi Los Galleros de Pedro Rey, Carlos Lara and Jesús Monarrez.

The jury was composed of Teddy Fregoso, Renée Victor, Anacani, Andy Russell, and Pepe Peña as chairperson.

The winner, and therefore qualified for the national final, was "Siempre, siempre", written by Enrique Izquieta and performed by Tony Solo; with "Amor no tardes", written and performed by Rodrigo, placing second; and "La mujer que tú esperabas", written and performed by Candi Sosa. The festival ended with a reprise of the winning entry.

Result of the Local OTI Festival – Los Angeles 1984
R/O	Song	Artist	Songwriter(s)	Result
1	"Derecho a nacer"	Ramón Peinado	Ramón Peinado	—N/a
2	"La mujer que tú esperabas"	Candi Sosa	Candi Sosa	3
3	"Quiero cantar que te quiero"	Paco Xavier	Paco Xavier	—N/a
4	"Tu amor, mi renacer"	Orlando Núñez	José Naranjo	—N/a
5	"Canción para la paz"	Jorge Falcón	Adrián López	—N/a
6	"Cayó el telón"	Carlos Álex Skewes	Carlos Álex Skewes	—N/a
7	"Siempre, siempre"	Tony Solo	Enrique Izquieta	Qualified
8	"Eres mi cambio de suerte"	Ali Olmo	Ali Olmo	—N/a
9	"Al viejo"	Juan de la Cruz	Juan de la Cruz	—N/a
10	"Receta de amor"	Sara González	Lalo Guerrero; Mark Guerrero	—N/a
11	"Mutis"	Consuelo	Consuelo	—N/a
12	"Amor no tardes"	Rodrigo	Rodrigo	2

=== New York pre-selection ===
WXTV held a televised pre-selection for the states of New York, New Jersey, Pennsylvania, and Connecticut. This sixth edition of the Local OTI Festival featured ten songs. It was presented by Rafael Pineda and Ana Carlota, and was broadcast on Channel 41. The show featured a guest performance by Los Chicos.

=== Tampa pre-selection ===
W50AC held an internal pre-selection. The song selected for the national final was "Y si el amor llega a ti", written by Margarita Freire and performed by Agustín Freire.

=== Final ===
The final was held on Saturday 6 October 1984 at the Miami Jai-Alai Fronton in Miami. It was presented by María Olga Fernández and Rolando Barral, and broadcast live on all SIN affiliates.

The winner was "Señora mi madre" representing KWEX-TV–San Antonio, written and performed by Alberto Ruiz; with "Mi segunda parte", written and performed by Lisa Marie de los Reyes, placing second; and "Siempre, siempre" representing KMEX-TV–Los Angeles, written by Enrique Izquieta and performed by Tony Solo, and "Ahora que estoy lejos", written and performed by Bárbara Alonso, both placing third. The festival ended with a reprise of the winning entry.

Winner

Result of the final of the National OTI–SIN Festival 1984
R/O	Song	Artist	Affiliate	Result
	"Señora mi madre"	Alberto Ruiz	KWEX-TV–San Antonio	1
	"Y si el amor llega a ti"	Agustín Freire	W50AC–Tampa	—N/a
	"Siempre, siempre"	Tony Solo	KMEX-TV–Los Angeles	3
	"Mi segunda parte"	Lisa Marie de los Reyes		2
	"Ahora que estoy lejos"	Bárbara Alonso		3

== At the OTI Festival ==
On 10 November 1984, the OTI Festival was held at the National Auditorium in Mexico City, Mexico, hosted by Televisa, and broadcast live throughout Ibero-America. Alberto Ruiz performed "Señora mi madre" in position 4, with David González conducting the event's orchestra. The song was not among the top-three places revealed.
