= OTI Festival 1984 =

13th OTI Song Festival

Date and venue
- Final: 10 November 1984
- Venue: National Auditorium; Mexico City, Mexico

Organization
- Organizer: Organización de Televisión Iberoamericana (OTI)
- Supervisor: Darío de la Peña
- Host broadcaster: Televisa
- Musical director: Chucho Ferrer
- Presenters: Raúl Velasco; Pilín León; Claudia Córdoba

Participants
- Number of entries: 21
- Returning countries: Portugal
- Non-returning countries: Uruguay
- Participation map: Participating countries Countries that participated in the past but not in 1984

Vote
- Voting system: A single jury selected the top three entries in a two-round secret vote
- Winning song: Chile "Agualuna"

The OTI Festival 1984 (Spanish: Decimotercer Gran Premio de la Canción Iberoamericana, Portuguese: Décimo Terceiro Grande Prêmio da Canção Ibero-Americana) was the 13th edition of the OTI Festival, held on 10 November 1984 at the National Auditorium in Mexico City, Mexico, and presented by Raúl Velasco, Pilín León, and Claudia Córdoba. It was organised by the Organización de Televisión Iberoamericana (OTI) and host broadcaster Televisa.

Broadcasters from twenty-one countries participated in the festival. The winner was the song "Agualuna", written and performed by Fernando Ubiergo representing Chile; with "Vem no meu sonho", written by Adelaide Ferreira and Luis Fernando, and performed by Ferreira herself representing Portugal, placing second; and "Tiempos mejores", written by Sergio Andrade, and performed by Yuri representing Mexico, placing third.

== Location ==
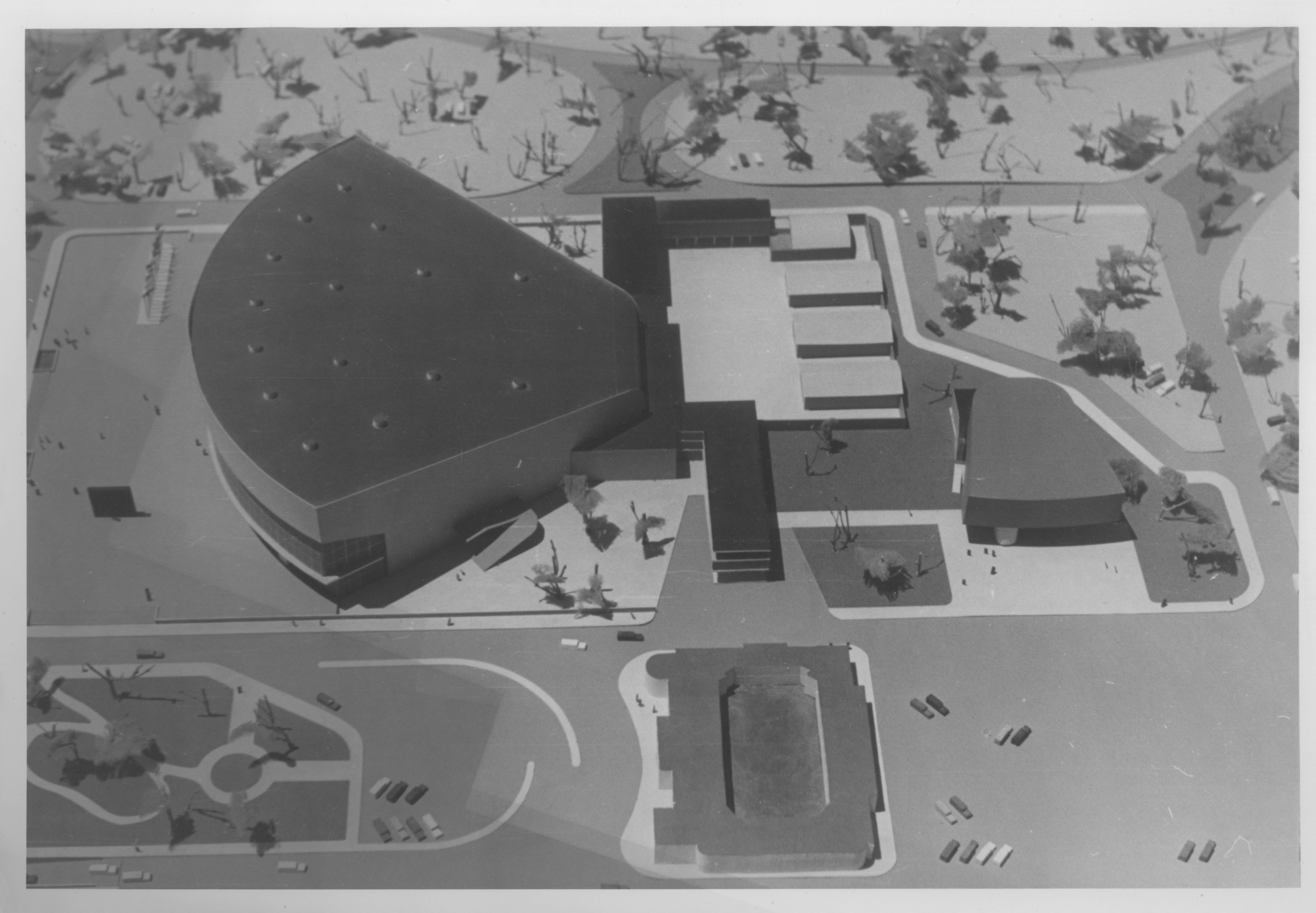
National Auditorium, Mexico City – host venue of the OTI Festival 1984.

The Organización de Televisión Iberoamericana (OTI) designated Televisa as the host broadcaster for the 13th edition of the OTI Festival. Televisa staged the event in Mexico City. The venue selected was the National Auditorium, which was the most important entertainment venue in the country. It was opened in 1952 and was designed by Pedro Ramírez Vázquez and Gonzalo Ramírez del Sordo. The venue had hosted the OTI Festival 1981. In 1989, the auditorium underwent a complete renovation, of which only the stands on the first two floors were preserved.

== Participants ==
Broadcasters from twenty-one countries participated in this edition of the OTI festival. The OTI members, public or private broadcasters from Spain, Portugal, and nineteen Spanish and Portuguese speaking countries of Ibero-America signed up for the festival. Uruguay not participated for the first time, and Portugal returned after having missed the two previous festivals.

Some of the participating broadcasters, such as those representing Chile, Mexico, the Netherlands Antilles, and the United States, selected their entries through their regular national televised competitions. Other broadcasters decided to select their entry internally.

Participants of the OTI Festival 1984
Country	Broadcaster(s)	Song	Artist	Songwriter(s)	Language	Conductor
Argentina		"La luz de mi escritorio no se enciende"	Alan y Roy	Alan Mc.Claskis; Roy Mc.Claskis	Spanish	Body Mc.Claskis
Brazil		"Barcas perdidas"	Moacyr Franco	Moacyr Franco	Spanish	Ted Moreno
Chile	TVN; UCTV; UTV	"Agualuna"	Fernando Ubiergo	Fernando Ubiergo	Spanish	Pancho Aranda
Colombia	Caracol Televisión; PUNCH; RTI	"Por lo que habías jurado"	Christopher y Ximena	Carlos González	Spanish	Mario Agustín Cuesta Domínguez
Costa Rica	Telecentro; Teletica	"Para el ciego del acordeón"	Álvaro Esquivel	Álvaro Esquivel	Spanish	Carlos Guzmán
Dominican Republic		"La vida es alegría"	Sonia Alfonso	Alex Mancilla	Spanish	Bertico Sosa
Ecuador		"Déjame saber"	Alfredo Mármol	Freddy Bardellini	Spanish	Gustavo Pacheco
El Salvador		"Soy"	Carlos Hernández	Carlos Hernández	Spanish	Chucho Ferrer
Guatemala		"El gran final"	Julio Enrique	Óscar Salazar	Spanish	Óscar Salazar
Honduras		"Andar tan solo por andar"	Carlos Brizio	Carlos Brizio	Spanish	Víctor Durán
Mexico	Televisa	"Tiempos mejores"	Yuri	Sergio Andrade	Spanish	Sergio Andrade
Netherlands Antilles	ATM	"La verdad"	Gabriel Flores	Gabriel Flores	Spanish	Rubén Germán
Nicaragua	SSTV	"Vuela canción"	Violeta Rostrán	Mario Montenegro	Spanish	Chucho Ferrer
Panama		"Hagamos un pacto"	Dini y Dany	Julio Chú; Simón Abadí	Spanish	Toby Muñoz
Paraguay		"Una gaviota sobre el mar"	Valencia	Casto Darío	Spanish	Casto Darío
Peru		"Todos los días pueden ser Navidad"	Raúl Vásquez	Raúl Vásquez	Spanish	Luis Neves
Portugal	RTP	"Vem no meu sonho"	Adelaide Ferreira	Adelaide Ferreira; Luis Fernando	Portuguese	José Calvário
Puerto Rico	Canal 2 Telemundo	"Todo llega"	Lou Briel	Lou Briel	Spanish	Eddie Fernández
Spain	TVE	"Cada día al despertar"	Bohemia	Javier Ibarrondo; Emilio Otero	Spanish	Eddy Guerín
United States	SIN	"Señora mi madre"	Alberto Ruiz	Alberto Ruiz	Spanish	David González
Venezuela		"Ilusión de un soñador"	José Antonio García Hernández	Agni Mogollón	Spanish	Arnoldo Nali

== Festival overview ==
The festival was held on Saturday 10 November 1984, beginning at 17:00 CST (23:00 UTC). It was presented by Raúl Velasco, Pilín León, and Claudia Córdoba. Velasco had previously presented the festival in 1974, 1976, and 1981. The musical director was Chucho Ferrer, who conducted the orchestra when required. The presenters introduced each of the competing entries with a speech praising the country it represented.

The event featured guest performances by María Conchita Alonso and Rocío Dúrcal. The first interval act consisted of a medley of songs composed by Juan Carlos Calderón performed by the orchestra and its backing singers. The second interval act consisted of a guest performance by Emmanuel.

During the course of the festival, Velasco named the following celebrities in attendance, who stood up and waved: Dulce, Prisma, Frank Moro, Jacqueline Andere, Arianna, Alberto Vázquez, Rogelio Guerra, Héctor Suárez, Guillermo Dávila, Grupo Gaviota, Susy Lemán, Guillermo Capetillo, and Erika Buenfil. The following dignitaries were also presented: Rafael del Castillo, president of the Mexican Football Federation; João Havelange, president of FIFA; Ricardo Pineda Milla, ambassador of Honduras to Mexico; Eugenia Tejada de Putzeys, Minister of Education of Guatemala; Jorge Palmieri, ex-ambassador of Guatemala; Francisco Nofli, ambassador of Portugal; Mario Chávez Chávez, general consul of Ecuador; Hanibal Campaña, ambassador of the Dominican Republic; Manuel Emilio Moraes, head of the diplomatic mission of Costa Rica; Ignacio Maña, ambassador of Colombia; Romy Vázquez de González, attaché of the embassy of Panama; Nicolás Josué Pinto, minister of the embassy of Argentina; Edith Guzmán, press attaché of the embassy of Venezuela; and Víctor Manuel Cortés Castro, head of the diplomatic mission of El Salvador.

The competition was held in two rounds, in the first round all the songs in competition were performed, from which three were qualified for the second round after the secret vote of the jury. Only those three qualifiers and the points they received were announced. The three songs were performed again and the jury voted again. Only the final ranking obtained by the three qualifiers was announced at the end.

The winner was the song "Agualuna", written and performed by Fernando Ubiergo representing Chile; with "Vem no meu sonho", written by Adelaide Ferreira and Luis Fernando, and performed by Ferreira herself representing Portugal, placing second; and "Tiempos mejores", written by Sergio Andrade, and performed by Yuri representing Mexico, placing third. Each of these entries received two trophies, one for the songwriters and one for the performer. The first prize trophies were delivered by João Havelange, president of FIFA, and Guillermo Cañedo, president of OTI; the second prize trophies by Óscar Gutiérrez, vice-president of the OTI legal commission, and Amaury Daumas, secretary general of OTI; and the third prize trophies by Héctor Condomenech, OTI consultant, and Eladio Lárez, vice-president of the OTI programs committee. The festival ended with a reprise of the winning entry.

Qualifier
Winner

Results of the OTI Festival 1984 – first round
R/O	Country	Song	Artist	Points	Result
1	Netherlands Antilles	"La verdad"	Gabriel Flores	—N/a	
2	Puerto Rico	"Todo llega"	Lou Briel	—N/a	
3	Venezuela	"Ilusión de un soñador"	José Antonio García Hernández	—N/a	
4	United States	"Señora mi madre"	Alberto Ruiz	—N/a	
5	Panama	"Hagamos un pacto"	Dini y Dany	—N/a	
6	Honduras	"Andar tan solo por andar"	Carlos Brizio	—N/a	
7	Brazil	"Barcas perdidas"	Moacyr Franco	—N/a	
8	Nicaragua	"Vuela canción"	Violeta Rostrán	—N/a	
9	Dominican Republic	"La vida es alegría"	Sonia Alfonso	—N/a	
10	Chile	"Agualuna"	Fernando Ubiergo	27	Qualified
11	Paraguay	"Una gaviota sobre el mar"	Valencia	—N/a	
12	Portugal	"Vem no meu sonho"	Adelaide Ferreira	26	Qualified
13	Guatemala	"El gran final"	Julio Enrique	—N/a	
14	Peru	"Todos los días pueden ser Navidad"	Raúl Vásquez	—N/a	
15	Mexico	"Tiempos mejores"	Yuri	26	Qualified
16	Ecuador	"Déjame saber"	Alfredo Mármol	—N/a	
17	Spain	"Cada día al despertar"	Bohemia	—N/a	
18	Argentina	"La luz de mi escritorio no se enciende"	Alan y Roy	—N/a	
19	El Salvador	"Soy"	Carlos Hernández	—N/a	
20	Costa Rica	"Para el ciego del acordeón"	Álvaro Esquivel	—N/a	
21	Colombia	"Por lo que habías jurado"	Christopher y Ximena	—N/a	

Results of the OTI Festival 1984 – second round
R/O	Country	Song	Artist	Place
1	Chile	"Agualuna"	Fernando Ubiergo	1
2	Portugal	"Vem no meu sonho"	Adelaide Ferreira	2
3	Mexico	"Tiempos mejores"	Yuri	3

=== Jury ===
For the first time in the festival's history, a single jury composed of well-known international figures was assembled that, present in the hall, was responsible for judging the competing songs. The voting system was not disclosed, and only the top three songs were announced after the two-round secret vote. The voting was supervised by Darío de la Peña –head of programs at OTI–, with José Antonio Suárez as notary public. The members of the jury were:

- Ednita Nazario – singer, represented Puerto Rico in 1979
- Juan Carlos Calderón – songwriter
- Mirla Castellanos – singer, represented Venezuela in 1972 and 1975
- Emmanuel – singer
- María Conchita Alonso – singer
- Antonio Vodanovic – television presenter
- Rocío Dúrcal – singer

== Broadcast ==
The festival was broadcast in the 21 participating countries, where the corresponding OTI member broadcasters relayed the contest through their networks after receiving it live via satellite.

Known details on the broadcasts in each country, including the specific broadcasting stations and commentators are shown in the tables below.

Broadcasters and commentators in participating countries
Country	Broadcaster	Channel(s)	Commentator(s)	Ref.
Chile	TVN	Canal 7 (Note: Delayed broadcast at 21:30 CLST (00:30+1 UTC))		
Chile	UTV	Canal 11		
Chile	UCTV	Canal 13		
Costa Rica	Telecentro	Telecentro Canal 6		
Costa Rica	Teletica	Canal 7 (Note: Delayed broadcast at 18:00 CST (00:00+1 UTC))		
Mexico	Televisa	Canal 2		
Netherlands Antilles	ATM	TeleAruba		
Netherlands Antilles	ATM	TeleCuraçao		
Peru	Panamericana Televisión	Canal 5 (Note: Delayed broadcast at 21:00 PET (02:00+1 UTC))		
Spain	TVE	TVE 1	No commentary	
United States	SIN (Note: Delayed broadcast later that day by all SIN affiliates, each in their own time zone.)			
