= Fernando Ubiergo =

Chilean singer-songwriter

- Born: Fernando Antonio Ubiergo Orellana; 8 February 1953 (age 73); Valparaíso, Chile
- Genres: Pop rock
- Occupation: Singer
- Instruments: Vocals and guitar
- Years active: 1976–present
- Website: / www.fernandoubiergo.cl

Fernando Antonio Ubiergo Orellana (born 8 February 1953) is a Chilean singer-songwriter and guitarist. During his musical career of fifty years he has recorded 18 albums.

He has also won several international competitions as a singer-songwriter: in 1978, he won the Viña del Mar International Song Festival with his song "El tiempo en las bastillas"; in 1982, he won the Benidorm Song Festival with his song "Yo pienso en ti"; and in 1984, he won the national final for the OTI Festival with his song "Agualuna", and thus represented Chile at the OTI Festival 1984 which he also won.
