= Pamela Hodar =

Chilean television presenter (born 1952)

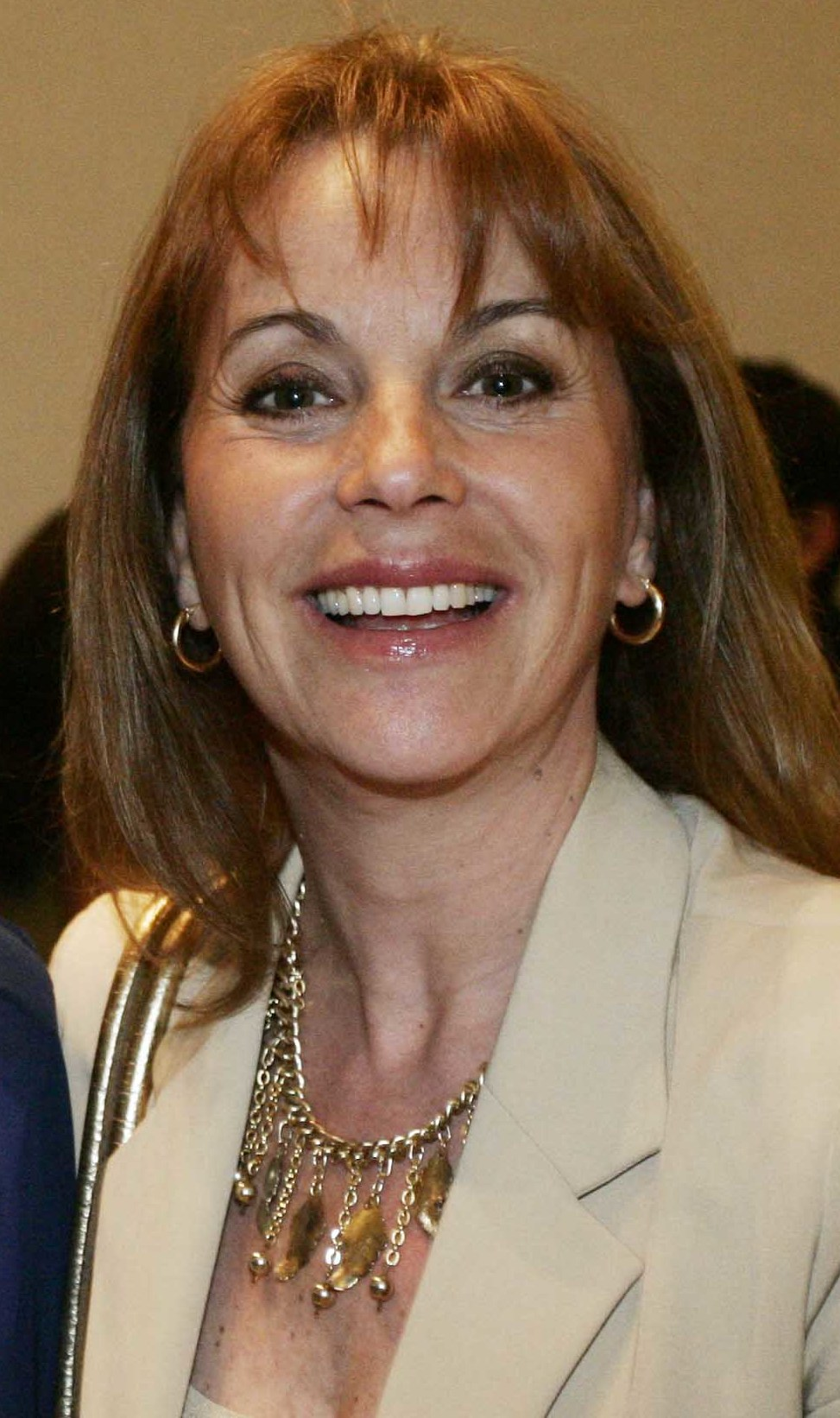
- Hodar in 2009

Presenter of Vina del Mar International Song Festival
- In office 1986–1990

Councilwoman of Concón
- In office 6 December 2004 – 28 June 2008

Councilwoman of Vina del Mar
- In office 6 December 2008 – 28 June 2021

Personal details
- Born: 28 August 1952 (age 74) Vina del Mar, Chile
- Party: Independent Democratic Union (UDI)
- Children: 2
- Education: Pontifical Catholic University of Valparaíso (BA)
- Occupation: TV presenter
- Profession: Journalist

Pamela de Lourdes Hodar Alba (born 28 August 1952) is a Chilean television presenter who also served as councilwoman of Viña del Mar. She hosted the OTI Festival 1986, along César Antonio Santis, from the Municipal Theatre of Santiago.

Hodar married the military man Juan Arenas. She had two sons, one of them, the former deputy Gonzalo Arenas.
