= Municipal Theatre of Santiago =

Coordinates: 33°26′27″S 70°38′51″W

Municipal Theatre of Santiago, National Opera of Chile
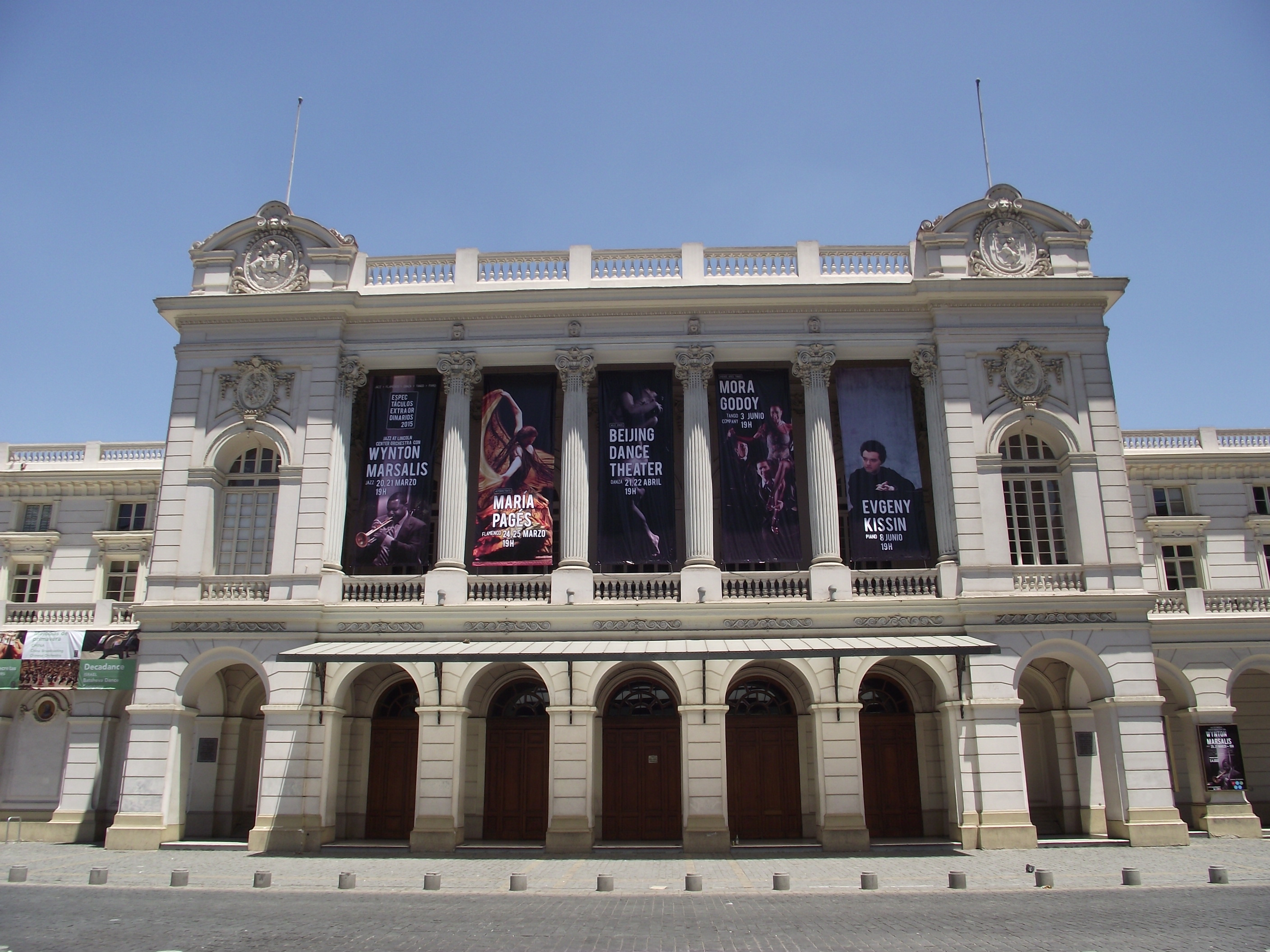
- National Opera of Chile
- Interactive map of Municipal Theatre of Santiago, National Opera of Chile
- Address: Agustinas 794 Santiago Metropolitan Region; Santiago, Chile
- Capacity: 1,500

Construction
- Opened: September 17, 1857

Website
- http://www.municipal.cl/

The Teatro Municipal, National Opera of Chile is the most important stage theatre and opera house in Santiago, Chile.

== History and overview ==
The Chilean government ceded a significant parcel of land in downtown Santiago to the municipality, in 1848, and an 1853 decree by President Manuel Montt Torres provided for the construction of a municipal theater in his nation's capital, by then a rapidly growing city. French Chilean architect Claudio Brunet des Baines was commissioned for its design, and its construction was entrusted to another French Chilean, civil engineer Felipe Charme de l´Isle. Brunet des Baines created a French Neoclassical exterior for the theater, though his 1855 death left the supervision of the design to his countryman, Lucien Hénault, and to the latter's assistant, Manuel Aldunate. The new team also benefited from a collaboration with Charles Garnier, the architect of the Opéra National de Paris.

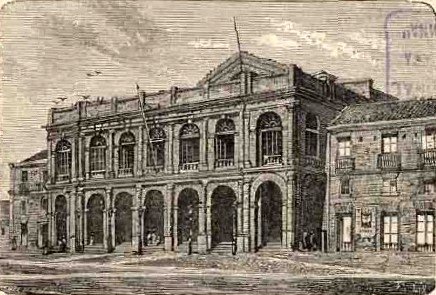
View of the Teatro Municipal in 1872.

The Teatro Municipal was inaugurated on September 17, 1857, with the opera Ernani by Giuseppe Verdi, performed by an Italian company brought in specially for the occasion. At the time, the theatre held 1,800 spectators, and included distinctive interior details such as a teardrop crystal chandelier. A December 8, 1870, performance by opera diva Carlotta Patti was followed by a massive fire, which practically destroyed the building. A quick response by both the local government and Chilean high society resulted in the theatre's prompt reconstruction, designed by Henault and completed on July 16, 1873. Its reinauguration was accompanied by a performance of Verdi's La forza del destino.

=== 20th century ===
The theatre went through a devastating 1906 earthquake, suffering the loss of most of its interior, and a second, serious fire in 1927, although it recovered quickly on both occasions. Following these reconstructions, the theatre's capacity was reduced to 1,500 in the main hall; however, its interior became more opulent. It was further modernized in 1952 and 1959, and numerous cultural institutions were created for the theatre during that era. The Santiago Philharmonic Orchestra was established in 1955, the Cultural Corporation of Santiago was formed to administer the center in 1957, the Santiago Ballet in 1959, and the Teatro Municipal Chorus, in 1962.

The Teatro Municipal was declared a National Monument, in 1974. The theatre hosted the two editions of the OTI Festival in Chile: in 1978 and in 1986. Renowned Chilean pianist Claudio Arrau, who had left his homeland in 1941, returned for a visit in 1984, on which occasion the Claudio Arrau Salon, seating 250 spectators, was inaugurated. The stage curtain, installed in 1926, was replaced in 1995 with funds raised by offering donors a piece of the older curtain as a keepsake.

The institution continues to maintain an active repertoire, and some of its most famous international guest performers and conductors have included names in ballet such as Julio Bocca, Mikhail Baryshnikov, the Bolshoi Ballet and the Mariinsky Ballet; pianists Claudio Arrau, Valentina Igoshina and Arthur Rubinstein, Vladimir Ashkenazy and Daniel Barenboim; violinists Mischa Elman, Jascha Heifetz, Yehudi Menuhin, Gil Shaham and Isaac Stern; conductors Zubin Mehta, Charles Dutoit, Kurt Masur and Pierre Boulez; and stage performers such as Plácido Domingo, Dame Kiri Te Kanawa, Charles Aznavour, Vivien Leigh, Luciano Pavarotti, Tito Schipa and Renée Fleming.
