= Algo Más =

Algo más may refer to:

- "Algo Más" (Camilo Sesto song), 1973
- "Algo Más" (La 5ª Estación song), 2004
- Algo más (es), 1973 album Camilo Sesto
- Algo más (es), 1983 album Los Secretos
