= OTI Festival 1975 =

4th OTI Song Festival

Date and venue
- Final: 15 November 1975
- Venue: WKAQ-TV studios San Juan, Puerto Rico

Organization
- Organizer: Organización de Televisión Iberoamericana (OTI)
- Host broadcaster: WKAQ-Telemundo
- Musical director: Miguelito Miranda
- Presenters: Marisol Malaret; Eddie Miró

Participants
- Number of entries: 19
- Returning countries: Argentina
- Non-returning countries: Honduras
- Participation map: Participating countries Countries that participated in the past but not in 1975

Vote
- Voting system: Each country had 5 jurors and each of them voted for their favorite entry.
- Winning song: Mexico "La felicidad"

The OTI Festival 1975 (Spanish: Cuarto Gran Premio de la Canción Iberoamericana, Portuguese: Quarto Grande Prêmio da Canção Ibero-Americana) was the fourth edition of the OTI Festival, held on 15 November 1975 at the WKAQ-TV studios in San Juan, Puerto Rico, and presented by Marisol Malaret and Eddie Miró. It was organised by the Organización de Televisión Iberoamericana (OTI) and host broadcaster WKAQ-Telemundo, who staged the event after winning the 1974 festival for Puerto Rico with the song "Hoy canto por cantar" by Nydia Caro.

Broadcasters from nineteen countries participated in the festival, repeating the record of participants of the previous year. The winner was the song "La felicidad", written by Felipe Gil, and performed by Gualberto Castro representing Mexico; with "Amor de medianoche", written by Juan Carlos Calderón and Cecilia, and performed by Cecilia herself representing Spain, placing second; and "Campesino de ciudad", written by Eduardo Cabas and Alfonso de la Espirella, and performed by Leonor González Mina representing Colombia, and "Soy como el viento, soy como el mar", written by Luisito Rey, and performed by Mirla Castellanos representing Venezuela, both placing third.

== Location ==
According to the rules of the OTI Festival at the time, the winning broadcaster of the previous edition would host the festival the following year. The Organización de Televisión Iberoamericana (OTI) designated WKAQ-Telemundo, which was the winning broadcaster of the previous edition with the song "Hoy sólo canto por cantar" performed by Nydia Caro for Puerto Rico, as the host broadcaster of the 1975 edition.

The WKAQ-Telemundo hosting committee decided that San Juan was the only suitable city to host the event in the country. They selected their own television studios as the host venue, which according to the members of the committee, were suitable and with good equipment. The seating capacity of 1,000 seats was considered also as suitable although with a less seat capacity than the previous venues of the festival. The television studios of WKAQ-Telemundo in San Juan were built in 1954, the same year when that network started broadcasting in the country.

== Participants ==
Broadcasters from nineteen countries participated in this edition of the OTI Festival. The OTI members, public or private broadcasters from Spain and eighteen Spanish and Portuguese speaking countries of Ibero-America signed up for the festival. This equaled the same record number of participants achieved the previous edition. From the countries that participated in that edition, Honduras did not return due to the disappointment with their tenth place, while Argentina returned after having missed that festival.

Some of the participating broadcasters, such as those representing Colombia, Guatemala, and Mexico, selected their entries through their regular national televised competitions. Other broadcasters decided to select their entry internally.

One performing artist had represented the same country previously: Mirla Castellanos had represented Venezuela in 1972. One of the most well-known participants was Cecilia representing Spain, in what would become one of her last appearances, because less than a year later, she died in a car accident.

Participants of the OTI Festival 1975
Country	Broadcaster(s)	Song	Artist	Songwriter(s)	Language	Conductor
Argentina		"Dos habitantes"	Marty Cosens	Omar Sánchez; Dino Ramos	Spanish	Jonathan Zarzosa
Bolivia	TVB	"Por esas cosas te amo"	Óscar Roca	Chicho Roca; Óscar Roca	Spanish	Lito Peña
Brazil	Rede Globo	"Desejo"	Raphael	Raphael	Portuguese	Waltel Branco
Chile	TVN	"Las puertas del mundo"	Osvaldo Díaz	Luis "Poncho" Venegas	Spanish	Horacio Saavedra
Colombia	Caracol Televisión; PUNCH; RTI	"Campesino de ciudad"	Leonor González Mina	Eduardo Cabas; Alfonso de la Espirella	Spanish	Armando Velásquez
Dominican Republic		"La vida está intranquila"	Luchi Vicioso	Jorge Taveras; Yaqui Núñez del Risco	Spanish	Jorge Taveras
Ecuador		"Quiero componer el mundo con mis manos"	Miriam Constante	Carlos Lozano; Lucía Gómez de Bracho	Spanish	Claudio Fabbri
El Salvador		"Trataré de olvidarte"	Eduardo Fuentes	Rafael Campos Martínez	Spanish	José Raúl Ramírez
Guatemala		"Vivirás pensando en alguien más"	Mario Vides	Mario Vides	Spanish	Roberto Porter
Mexico	Televisa	"La felicidad"	Gualberto Castro	Felipe Gil	Spanish	Chucho Ferrer
Netherlands Antilles	ATM	"Una flor en el balcón"	George Willems	Héctor Garrido; Juan Antonio Mestre; George Willems	Spanish	Lito Peña
Nicaragua		"Quiero agradecer al mundo"	Mauricio Peña	Roger Fisher	Spanish	Mandy Vizoso
Panama	RPC-TV	"Tú y yo"	Pablo Azael	Pablo Azael	Spanish	Jack del Río
Peru		"¡Qué lindo es el amor!"	Gladys Mercado	Luz María Carriquiry	Spanish	Enrique Lynch
Puerto Rico	WKAQ-Telemundo	"¿Adónde vas amigo?"	Los Hispanos	Edwin Oliver	Spanish	Wisón Torres Jr.
Spain	TVE	"Amor de medianoche"	Cecilia	Juan Carlos Calderón; Cecilia	Spanish	Juan Carlos Calderón
United States	SIN	"Para ganar tu corazón"	José Antonio	Julio Sala	Spanish	Tony Ramírez
Uruguay	Sociedad Televisora Larrañaga	"Quiero nacer"	Ricardo Montaña	Carlos de Coits	Spanish	Julio Frade
Venezuela	Venevisión	"Soy como el viento, soy como el mar"	Mirla Castellanos	Luisito Rey	Spanish	Eduardo Cabrera

== Festival overview ==
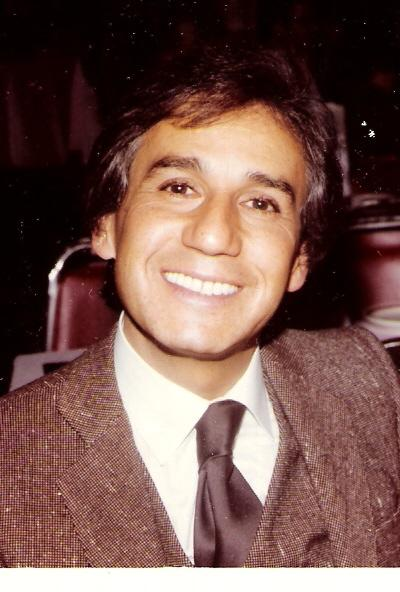
Gualberto Castro, winner of the OTI Festival 1975.

The festival was held on Saturday 15 November 1975, beginning at 19:00 AST (23:00 UTC). It was presented by Marisol Malaret and Eddie Miró. The musical director was Miguelito Miranda who conducted the orchestra when required. The draw to determine the running order (R/O) was held on 6 November live on WKAQ-Telemundo's Noche de Gala variety show.

There were two opening acts; one of them was the winning song of the previous year, "Hoy sólo canto por cantar" performed by Nydia Caro.

The winner was the song "La felicidad", written by Felipe Gil, and performed by Gualberto Castro representing Mexico; with "Amor de medianoche", written by Juan Carlos Calderón and Cecilia, and performed by Cecilia herself representing Spain, placing second; and "Campesino de ciudad", written by Eduardo Cabas and Alfonso de la Espirella, and performed by Leonor González Mina representing Colombia, and "Soy como el viento, soy como el mar", written by Luisito Rey, and performed by Mirla Castellanos representing Venezuela, both placing third.

Winner

Results of the OTI Festival 1975
R/O	Country	Song	Artist	Votes	Place
1	Bolivia	"Por esas cosas te amo"	Óscar Roca	0	17
2	El Salvador	"Trataré de olvidarte"	Eduardo Fuentes	0	17
3	Peru	"¡Qué lindo es el amor!"	Gladys Mercado	3	10
4	Chile	"Las puertas del mundo"	Osvaldo Díaz	5	5
5	Spain	"Amor de medianoche"	Cecilia	14	2
6	Brazil	"Desejo"	Raphael	4	8
7	Argentina	"Dos habitantes"	Marty Cosens	3	10
8	Guatemala	"Vivirás pensando en alguien más"	Mario Vides	2	14
9	Nicaragua	"Quiero agradecer al mundo"	Mauricio Peña	4	8
10	United States	"Para ganar tu corazón"	José Antonio	5	5
11	Puerto Rico	"Dónde vas, amigo"	Los Hispanos	5	5
12	Netherlands Antilles	"Una flor en el balcón"	George Willems	3	10
13	Colombia	"Campesino de ciudad"	Leonor González Mina	10	3
14	Uruguay	"Quiero nacer"	Ricardo Montaña	3	10
15	Venezuela	"Soy como el viento, soy como el mar"	Mirla Castellanos	10	3
16	Mexico	"La felicidad"	Gualberto Castro	20	1
17	Dominican Republic	"La vida está intranquila"	Luchi Vicioso	2	14
18	Ecuador	"Quiero componer el mundo con mis manos"	Miriam Constante	0	17
19	Panama	"Tú y yo"	Pablo Azael	2	14

== Detailed voting results ==
Each participating broadcaster assembled a national jury located in its respective country, composed of five members each. Each juror gave one vote to its favorite entry and could not vote for the entry representing its own country. Each participating broadcaster had also a delegate present in the hall to stand in for its jury if it was not receiving the event live, or in case of communication failure during the broadcast or voting. To ensure that there was no vote switching, before the voting segment began each participating broadcaster announced to its national audience the vote of its jury in local opt-out from its studios.

== Broadcast ==
The festival was broadcast in the 19 participating countries, where the corresponding OTI member broadcasters relayed the contest through their networks after receiving it live via satellite.

Known details on the broadcasts of the festival in each country, including the specific broadcasting stations, commentators, and presenters of the local opt-out are shown in the tables below.

Broadcasters, commentators, and local presenters in participating countries
Country	Broadcaster	Channel(s)	Commentator(s)	Local presenter(s)	Ref.
Colombia	Inravisión (Note: Through the programadoras: Caracol Televisión, Producciones Nacionales Colombianas de Hoy (PUNCH), and Radio Televisión Interamericana (RTI).)	Segunda Cadena			
Mexico	Televisa	Canal 2			
Puerto Rico	WKAQ-Telemundo	Canal 2			
Spain	TVE	TVE 1			

Broadcasters and commentators in non-participating countries
Country	Broadcaster	Channel(s)	Commentator(s)	Ref.
Costa Rica	Telecentro	Telecentro Canal 6		
Costa Rica	Teletica	Canal 7		
