= Colombia in the OTI Festival 1973 =

- OTI Festival 1973
- Participating broadcasters: Caracol Televisión; Producciones Nacionales Colombianas de Hoy (PUNCH); Radio Televisión Interamericana (RTI)
- Country: Colombia
- Selection process: National OTI Festival
- Selection date: 16 September 1973

Competing entry
- Song: "Una orquídea, un amor"
- Artist: Claudia Osuna
- Songwriter: Alfonso de la Espirella

Placement
- Final result: 9th, 3 votes

Participation chronology
◄1972 •	1973	• 1974►

Colombia was represented at the OTI Festival 1973 with the song "Una orquídea, un amor", written by Alfonso de la Espirella, and performed by Claudia Osuna. The Colombian participating broadcasters, programadoras Caracol Televisión, Producciones Nacionales Colombianas de Hoy (PUNCH), and Radio Televisión Interamericana (RTI), selected their entry through a national competition. The song, that was performed in position 6, placed ninth out of 14 competing entries, tying with the songs from Argentina and Venezuela with 3 votes.

== National stage ==
Programadoras Caracol Televisión, Producciones Nacionales Colombianas de Hoy (PUNCH), and Radio Televisión Interamericana (RTI) held a national televised competition to select their entry for the 2nd edition of the OTI Festival within PUNCH's regular show Mano a mano musical broadcast on Inravisión's Canal Nacional.

The programadoras opened a public submission period for songs with a deadline of 31 May 1973. The songs had to be original, not having been published or performed in public before 15 May, and not last more than three and a half minutes. The competition consisted of two qualifying phases and a final. In the first phase, which took place between 20 May and 29 June, each song was presented on television performed by the artist registered by the songwriter in the song's application. At the end of the first phase, the ten best songs and the ten best performers qualified for the second phase. In the second phase, which took place between 5 August and 16 September, the ten shortlisted songs were performed by their original artist and by some of the qualified artists, and the finalists were chosen from among them.

Competing entries on the National OTI Festival – Colombia 1973 (Note: Incomplete list of the competing entries.)
Song	Songwriter(s)
"Amor, amor, amor"	Nancy Pulccio de Mejía
"El adiós del emigrante"	
"Mis treinta y dos dientes"	Elia Fleta
"Una orquídea, un amor"	Alfonso de la Espirella

=== Final ===
The final was held on Sunday 16 September 1973, and was presented by Pacheco and María Cristina. The participating entries were accompanied by an orchestra conducted by Jimmy Salcedo. The show featured guest performances by Cristopher and Claudia de Colombia.

The winner was "Una orquídea, un amor", written by Alfonso de la Espirella, and performed by Claudia Osuna. The festival ended with a reprise of the winning entry.

Winner

Result of the final of the National OTI Festival – Colombia 1973
R/O	Song	Artist	Result
	"Mis treinta y dos dientes"	José y Darío	
	"Una orquídea, un amor"	Claudia Osuna	1
		Fausto	
		Amparito	

== At the OTI Festival ==
On 10 November 1973, the OTI Festival was held at the Palácio das Artes in Belo Horizonte, Brazil, hosted by TV Itacolomi on behalf of Rede Tupi, and broadcast live throughout Ibero-America. Claudia Osuna performed "Una orquídea, un amor" in position 6, with Jimmy Salcedo conducting the event's orchestra, and placing ninth out of 14 competing entries, in a tie in 3 votes with the songs from Argentina and Venezuela.

The festival was broadcast live by the programadoras on Inravisión's Canal Nacional.

=== Voting ===
Each participating broadcaster, or group of broadcasters that jointly participated representing a country, assembled a five-member jury, which each member voting for its favourite song.

Votes awarded to Colombia
Score	Country
3 votes	Bolivia

Votes awarded by Colombia
Score	Country
4 votes	Chile
1 vote	Argentina
