= Colombia in the OTI Festival 1975 =

- OTI Festival 1975
- Participating broadcasters: Caracol Televisión; Producciones Nacionales Colombianas de Hoy (PUNCH); Radio Televisión Interamericana (RTI)
- Country: Colombia
- Selection process: National OTI Festival
- Selection date: 15 October 1975

Competing entry
- Song: "Campesino de ciudad"
- Artist: Leonor González Mina
- Songwriters: Eduardo Cabas; Alfonso de la Espirella

Placement
- Final result: 3rd, 10 votes

Participation chronology
◄1974 •	1975	• 1976►

Colombia was represented at the OTI Festival 1975 with the song "Campesino de ciudad", written by Eduardo Cabas and Alfonso de la Espirella, and performed by Leonor González Mina. The Colombian participating broadcasters, programadoras Caracol Televisión, Producciones Nacionales Colombianas de Hoy (PUNCH), and Radio Televisión Interamericana (RTI), selected their entry through a national competition. The song, that was performed in position 13, placed third out of 19 competing entries, tying with the song from Venezuela with 10 votes.

== National stage ==
Programadoras Caracol Televisión, Producciones Nacionales Colombianas de Hoy (PUNCH), and Radio Televisión Interamericana (RTI) held a national competition with several shows and a final to select their entry for the 4th edition of the OTI Festival. The ten participating acts toured the country in a show presented in several cities, and the winner was chosen in a televised final show in Bogotá staged by RTI Televisión. Singer Mario Gareña and his entry were disqualified for not showing up to one of the shows on the tour.

◇ Disqualified entry

Competing entries on the National OTI Festival – Colombia 1975
Song	Artist	Songwriter(s)
"A la vida"	Liz	Nancy Pulccio de Mejía
"Campesino de ciudad"	Leonor González Mina	Eduardo Cabas; Alfonso de la Espirella
"Canción de amor"	Martha Isabel	Patricia Esther
"El amor es primero"	Gustavo Gil	Harold Cetina
"El trovador"	Óscar Javier	Óscar Javier Ferreira
"Florecerá el amor"	Uno y Dos	Gloria Ureña de Escandón
"Madre tierra"	Lukas	Lukas
"Mensaje de paz"	Henry XV	Gloria Ureña de Escandón
"Un detalle de tantos"	Blanca Luz	Miguel Fernando
	Mario Gareña ◇	

=== Final ===
The final was held on Wednesday 15 October 1975, beginning at 22:30 COT (03:30+1 UTC), at the Teatro Jorge Eliécer Gaitán in Bogotá, and was presented by Pacheco and Yudi Enríquez. The participating entries were accompanied by an orchestra conducted by maestros Franco, Armando Velásquez, or Montaña. The show featured a guest performance by Alicia Juárez.

The judging panel consisted of the audience in the cities where the show toured, with a value of 30% of the total, and thirty-five jurors from Pereira, Medellín, Cali, Barranquilla, and Ibagué, who gave their verdict in the final.

The winner was "Campesino de ciudad", written by Eduardo Cabas and Alfonso de la Espirella, and performed by Leonor González Mina. The festival ended with a reprise of the winning entry.

Winner

Result of the final of the National OTI Festival – Colombia 1975
R/O	Song	Artist	Result
	"A la vida"	Liz	
	"Campesino de ciudad"	Leonor González Mina	1
	"Canción de amor"	Martha Isabel	
	"El amor es primero"	Gustavo Gil	
	"El trovador"	Óscar Javier	3
	"Florecerá el amor"	Uno y Dos	
	"Madre tierra"	Lukas	
	"Mensaje de paz"	Henry XV	
	"Un detalle de tantos"	Blanca Luz	

== At the OTI Festival ==
On 15 November 1975, the OTI Festival was held at the WKAQ-TV studios in San Juan, Puerto Rico, hosted by WKAQ-Telemundo, and broadcast live throughout Ibero-America. Leonor González Mina performed "Campesino de ciudad" in position 13, with Armando Velásquez conducting the event's orchestra, placing third out of 19 competing entries, tying with the song from Venezuela with 10 votes.

The festival was broadcast live by the programadoras on Inravisión's Segunda Cadena.
