= Honduras in the OTI Festival =

- OTI Festival
- Participating broadcaster: Televisión Nacional de Honduras (TNH)

Participation summary
- Appearances: 25
- First appearance: 1974
- Last appearance: 2000
- Highest placement: 7th in 1979, 1980, 1981
- Participation history: 1974; 1975; 1976; 1977; 1978; 1979; 1980; 1981; 1982; 1983; 1984; 1985; 1986; 1987; 1988; 1989; 1990; 1991; 1992; 1993; 1994; 1995; 1996; 1997; 1998; 2000

The participation of Honduras in the OTI Festival began at the third OTI Festival in 1974. The Honduran participating broadcaster was Televisión Nacional de Honduras (TNH), which was member of the Organización de Televisión Iberoamericana (OTI). Since its debut, it only missed the 1975 festival. Its best result in the festival was seventh achieved in 1979, 1980, and 1981.

== History ==
As many Central American countries in the OTI Festival, Honduras didn't really have a successful participation in the contest. In fact, Televisión Nacional de Honduras (TNH) never managed to get a victory during its history in the event, but reached the top ten on six occasions.

In 1974, TNH selected "Río viejo, viejo amigo" by Moisés Canelo as its first entry, which achieved a respectable ninth place. After a withdrawal in 1975, "Por cantarle al mar" by Wilson Reynoot placed eighth in 1976. In 1978, "Por esas pequeñas cosas" by Domingo Trimarchi also placed eighth. In 1979, "Hermano hispanoamericano" by Gloria Janeth placed seventh. Moisés Canelo returned to the contest in 1980, placing seventh with his song "Tú, siempre tú". One year later, in 1981, "Ven" by Oneyda placed seventh for the third time. Since then, Honduras struggled in the contest and never managed to get a top ten place again.

== Participation overview ==
| SF | Semi-finalist |
| ◇ | Contest cancelled |

| Year | Song | Artist | Songwriter(s) | Conductor | Place | Points |
|---|---|---|---|---|---|---|
| 1974 | "Río viejo, viejo amigo" | Moisés Canelo | Horacio Cadalso | Jorge Ortega | 10 | 3 |
| 1975 | Did not participate | | | | | |
| 1976 | "Por cantarle al mar" | Wilson Reynoot | | | 8 | 3 |
| 1977 | "El hombre" | Tony Morales | Rodolfo Bonilla | Rafael Ibarbia | 17 | 0 |
| 1978 | "Por esas pequeñas cosas" | Domingo Trimarchi | Francisco Javier Henández; Domingo Trimarchi | Chucho Ferrer | 8 | 12 |
| 1979 | "Hermano hispanoamericano" | Gloria Janeth | Tony Sierra | Eduardo Cabrera | 7 | 19 |
| 1980 | "Tú, siempre tú" | Moisés Canelo | Alberto Valladares | Tino Geiser | 7 | 22 |
| 1981 | "Ven" | Oneyda | Alberto Valladares | | 7 | 16 |
| 1982 | "Año dos mil" | Miguel Ángel Mejía | Serafina de Milla | Víctor Durán | 17 | 6 |
| 1983 | "Empieza" | Jorge Gómez | Jorge Gómez | Víctor Durán | —N/a | |
| 1984 | "Andar tan solo por andar" | Carlos Brizio | Carlos Brizio | Víctor Durán | —N/a | |
| 1985 | "Una historia tantas veces contada" | Dúo tú y yo | Alberto Valladares | Víctor Durán | —N/a | |
| 1986 | "Soy como soy" | Víctor Donayre | Víctor Donayre | Víctor Durán | —N/a | |
| 1987 | "Uno más" | Rodolfo Torres | Fernando Chacón; Rodolfo Torres | Fernando Correia Martins | —N/a | |
| 1988 | "Te amo" | Gloria Janet | Tony Sierra | Oscar Cardozo Ocampo | 14 | 0 |
| 1989 | "Al fin la encontré" | Antonio Paredes | Erick Mondragón | | —N/a | |
| 1990 | "Qué fácil es" | Patricia Ramírez | Emilio Fonseca | William Sánchez | —N/a | |
| 1991 | "Sembrando cantos" | Max Jovel Argueta y Mauricio Medina | Mauricio Medina | Alfonso Flores | SF | —N/a |
| 1992 | "El otro muro" | Karina Nasser | Emilio Fonseca; Víctor Donaire | | —N/a | |
| 1993 | "Sale el sol" | Carlos Alberto | Leo Villeda; Asdra | José Fabra | —N/a | |
| 1994 | "Espera hasta que den las tres" | Delma Adriana Reyes | Reniery Seaman Silva | | SF | —N/a |
| 1995 | "La casa de Pablo" | Carlos Brizzio | Carlos Brizzio | Oscar Cardozo Ocampo | —N/a | |
| 1996 | "Rosas y espinas" | Millicent Viera | José Antonio González | Claudio Jácome Harb | —N/a | |
| 1997 | "¿Dónde está el amor?" | Tony Castellanos | | | SF | —N/a |
| 1998 | "Mi otra mitad" | Carlos Alberto Durón | Carlos Alberto Durón | Camilo Corea | SF | —N/a |
| 1999 | Contest cancelled ◇ | | | | | |
| 2000 | "Te entregué mi corazón" | Diana Lara | Serafina de Milla | | SF | —N/a |
