= Mexico in the OTI Festival 1974 =

- OTI Festival 1974
- Participating broadcaster: Televisa
- Country: Mexico
- Selection process: National OTI Festival
- Selection date: 6 October 1974

Competing entry
- Song: "Quijote"
- Artist: Enrique Cáceres
- Songwriter: Roberto Cantoral

Placement
- Final result: 10th, 3 votes

Participation chronology
◄1973 •	1974	• 1975►

Mexico was represented at the OTI Festival 1974 with the song "Quijote", written by Roberto Cantoral, and performed by Enrique Cáceres. The Mexican participating broadcaster, Televisa, selected its entry through a national televised competition with several phases. The song, that was performed in position 13, placed tenth out of 19 competing entries with 3 votes. In addition, Televisa was also the host broadcaster and staged the event at the Teatro Juan Ruiz de Alarcón of the Centro de Convenciones in Acapulco, after winning the previous edition with the song "Qué alegre va María" by Imelda Miller.

== National stage ==
Televisa held a national competition with five televised qualifying rounds and a final to select its entry for the 3rd edition of the OTI Festival. This third edition of the National OTI Festival featured forty songs, of which nine reached the final.

The shows were presented by Raúl Velasco, and were broadcast on Canal 2 within the show Siempre en Domingo. The musical director was Chucho Ferrrer, who conducted the orchestra when required.

Competing entries on the National OTI Festival – Mexico 1974
Song	Artist	Songwriter(s)	Conductor
"A mí"	Jorge Castro	Roberto Cantoral	
"A mi morena"	Héctor Meneses	Héctor Meneses	
"A partir de ti"	Carlos Lico	Mario Arturo; David Haro	
"Alas cansadas"	Víctor Yturbe	Chamín Correa	
"Así te quiero"	Mónica Ygual	Mónica Ygual	
"Cada vez que te veo partir"	Luis Heredia	Luis Heredia	
"Camina"	Irma Carlón	Irma Carlón	
"Canción de nueva vida"	Pájaro Alberto	Pájaro Alberto	
"Canto para dos amantes"	Carmela y Rafael	Juan Acereto	
"Comunicación"	María Medina	Felipe Gil; Mario Arturo	
"Cuando menos lo piense"	Patrizio	Jorge Sánchez Schultz	
"Cuando nace un niño"	Héctor Meneses	Héctor Meneses	
"Dile paloma"	Carlos Lico	Carlos Lico	
"Donde ibas"	María del Rayo	Homero Aguilar	
"El principio de mi fin"	Víctor Yturbe	Juan Gabriel	
"El valor de tu amor"	Arturo Castro	Arturo Castro	
"Encontré un amigo"	Irma Carlón	Pedro Luis Bartilotti	
"Eres mi niña"	Sergio Esquivel	Sergio Esquivel	
"Esos días"	Patrizio	Álvaro Dávila	
"Fiel a la vida"	Sola	Sergio Esquivel	
"Hombre pájaro"	Jaime Moreno	Carlos Blanco	
"Lágrimas de sal"	Óscar Chávez	Óscar Chávez	
"Los días de la vida"	Jorge Castro	José María Napoleón	
"Mi razón"	Erick	Alberto Zentella	
"Olvidarte"	Grupo Juglaría	Miguel A. Medina	
"Partiré"	Gualberto Castro	Armando Manzanero	
"¿Quién eres tú?"	Mónica Ygual	Mónica Ygual	
"Quijote"	Enrique Cáceres	Roberto Cantoral	
"Rock jarocho"	Grupo Náhuatl	Grupo Náhuatl	
"Seguir al mundo"	Sola	Javier Cureño; Jonathán Zarzosa	
"Simplemente te quiero"	María Medina	Felipe Gil	
"Sin ella"	Álvaro Dávila	Chamín Correa	
"Sólo un sueño"	Erick	Carlos Gómez Barrera	
"Sueños de la infancia"	Los Randall	Raúl Aguilar; Edgar Aguilar	
"Te extrañaré"	Óscar Chávez	Óscar Chávez	
"Tu nombre es felicidad"	Arturo Castro	Arturo Castro	
"Un cuento"	Grupo Juglaría	Grupo Juglaría	
"Un pueblo donde llegar"	Los Randall	José Luis Almada; Jorge Macías	
"Y pensar que nunca más"	José Luis Almada and Jorge Macías	José Luis Almada; Jorge Macías	
"Y las piedras florecerán"	Carmela y Rafael	Walter Gala	

=== Qualifying rounds ===
The five qualifying rounds were held on Sundays 1, 8, 15, 22, and 29 September 1974. The nine highest-scoring entries among the forty competing advanced to the final.

Qualifier

Result of the qualifying rounds of the National OTI Festival – Mexico 1974
R/O	Song	Artist	Points	Result
First qualifying round – 1 September 1974
1	"Sólo un sueño"	Erick	35	—N/a
2	"Así te quiero"	Mónica Ygual	33	—N/a
3	"A mi morena"	Héctor Meneses	42	—N/a
4	"Canción de nueva vida"	Pájaro Alberto	32	—N/a
5	"Cada vez que te veo partir"	Luis Heredia	41	—N/a
6	"Hombre pájaro"	Jaime Moreno	40	—N/a
7	"Olvidarte"	Grupo Juglaría	40	—N/a
8	"A mí"	Jorge Castro	52	—N/a
Second qualifying round – 8 September 1974
1	"Donde ibas"	María del Rayo	33	—N/a
2	"Un pueblo donde llegar"	Los Randall	39	—N/a
3	"Eres mi niña"	Sergio Esquivel	45	—N/a
4	"Mi razón"	Erick	34	—N/a
5	"Dile paloma"	Carlos Lico	49	—N/a
6	"Seguir al mundo"	Sola	58	Qualified
7	"Cuando menos lo piense"	Patrizio	35	—N/a
8	"Canto para dos amantes"	Carmela y Rafael	31	—N/a
Third qualifying round – 15 September 1974
1	"Y pensar que nunca más"	José Luis Almada and Jorge Macías	42	—N/a
2	"Encontré un amigo"	Irma Carlón	38	—N/a
3	"Rock jarocho"	Grupo Náhuatl	21	—N/a
4	"Sueños de la infancia"	Los Randall	20	—N/a
5	"Lágrimas de sal"	Óscar Chávez	38	—N/a
6	"Simplemente te quiero"	María Medina	54	Qualified
7	"Sin ella"	Álvaro Dávila	45	—N/a
8	"El valor de tu amor"	Arturo Castro	53	Qualified
Fourth qualifying round – 22 September 1974
1	"El principio de mi fin"	Víctor Yturbe	35	—N/a
2	"¿Quién eres tú?"	Mónica Ygual	39	—N/a
3	"Esos días"	Patrizio	42	—N/a
4	"Un cuento"	Grupo Juglaría	43	—N/a
5	"Camina"	Irma Carlón	44	—N/a
6	"Cuando nace un niño"	Héctor Meneses	47	—N/a
7	"Los días de la vida"	Jorge Castro	54	Qualified
8	"Quijote"	Enrique Cáceres	58	Qualified
Fifth qualifying round – 29 September 1974
1	"Tu nombre es felicidad"	Arturo Castro		—N/a
2	"Te extrañaré"	Óscar Chávez		—N/a
3	"Fiel a la vida"	Sola		Qualified
4	"Alas cansadas"	Víctor Yturbe		—N/a
5	"Y las piedras florecerán"	Carmela y Rafael		—N/a
6	"A partir de ti"	Carlos Lico		Qualified
7	"Comunicación"	María Medina		Qualified
8	"Partiré"	Gualberto Castro		Qualified

=== Final ===
The final was held on Sunday 6 October 1974. The winner was "Quijote", written by Roberto Cantoral, and performed by Enrique Cáceres. The festival ended with a reprise of the winning entry.

Winner

Result of the final of the National OTI Festival – Mexico 1974
R/O	Song	Artist	Points	Result
1	"A partir de ti"	Carlos Lico	131	6
2	"Quijote"	Enrique Cáceres	144	1
3	"Seguir al mundo"	Sola	132	5
4	"Comunicación"	María Medina	140	2
5	"Partiré"	Gualberto Castro		
6	"Simplemente te quiero"	María Medina	140	2
7	"El valor de tu amor"	Arturo Castro		
8	"Fiel a la vida"	Sola		
9	"Los días de la vida"	Jorge Castro	136	4

== At the OTI Festival ==
On 26 October 1974, the OTI Festival was held at the Teatro Juan Ruiz de Alarcón of the Centro de Convenciones in Acapulco, hosted by Televisa, and broadcast live throughout Ibero-America. Enrique Cáceres performed "Quijote" in position 13, with Ramón Flores conducting the event's orchestra, and placing tenth out of 19 competing entries with 3 votes.

=== Voting ===
Each participating broadcaster, or group of broadcasters that jointly participated representing a country, assembled a five-member jury, which each member voting for its favourite song. Lupita Oláiz was the spokesperson who announced the Mexican jury's vote.

Votes awarded to Mexico
Score	Country
1 vote	Panama; United States; Uruguay

Votes awarded by Mexico
Score	Country
2 votes	Puerto Rico
1 vote	Ecuador; Nicaragua; Uruguay
