= Leonor González Mina =

Colombian musician and actress (1934–2024)

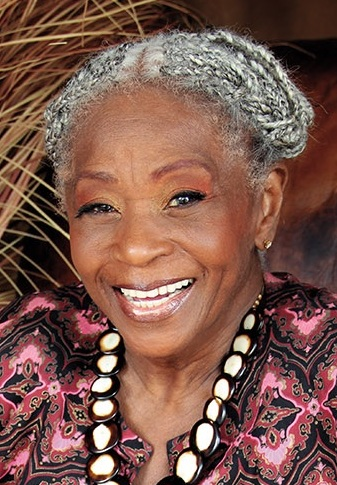
- Mina in 2016
- Born: June 16, 1934; Jamundí, Valle del Cauca, Colombia
- Died: November 27, 2024 (aged 90)
- Other name: "La Negra grande de Colombia".
- Occupations: Composer, singer
- Spouse: Esteban Cabezas Rher

Leonor González Mina (June 16, 1934 – November 27, 2024) was an Afro-Colombian musician and actress, known as "la Negra Grande de Colombia" ("The Great Black Woman of Colombia"). She is known for her work in several genres of Colombian music, including bolero, pasillo, bambuco, and especially cumbia. She is known for songs such as "Mi Buenaventura", "Navidad Negra", and "Yo Me Llamo Cumbia".

== Life and career ==
Leonor González Mina was born in Jamundí, Valle del Cauca, Colombia on June 16, 1934. The musical career of Leonor González Mina began when she was 18 years old, when she decided to leave her home. After six months, she participated as a dancer in a ballet by Delia Zapata Olivella and her brother Manuel, acting before an audience in Paris. With this dance company she travelled internationally to countries including China, Germany, and the Soviet Union. When she returned to Colombia, she produced her first record, titled "Cantos de mi tierra y de mi raza".

Leonor González Mina was a reference of cultural identity, Valluna and Colombian, that for more than 60 years of a successful artistic career took the Afro-Pacific culture to many areas of the planet. She demonstrated all the rhythms of Colombian culture, from a cumbia to a bambuco, her life and work was a legacy of musical identity and nation. She recorded more than 30 records during her lifetime.

In 1975, González Mina won the Colombian national selection for the OTI Festival, with the song "Campesino de ciudad", written by Eduardo Cabas and Alfonso de la Espirella, and thus represented Colombia at the OTI Festival 1975 where she placed third with 10 points in a tie with Mirla Castellanos with the song "Soy como el viento, soy como el mar" written by Luisito Rey, representing Venezuela.

Leonor González Mina also acted in a Colombian television series, and participated in the congressional elections of 1998, when she was elected as a cameral representative for Bogotá with the Colombian Liberal Party.

González Mina died on November 27, 2024, at the age of 90.

== Songs ==
Some of her songs are:

- Toto La Momposina - La Mar de Musicas (Cartagena)
- Liliana Montes-"Aguacerito llové" del álbum Corazón Pacífico
- Mi Buenaventura/Mi Peregoyo - Leonor González Mina by Mulato de Jesus Maria
- Navidad Negra- (Pescador de mi tierra) Leonor González Mina
- Simplemente la Negra Grande de Colombia -Soy de Buenaventura
