= Paco Bandeira =

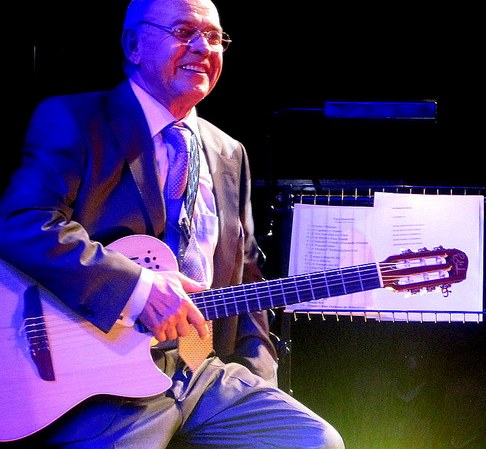

Background information
- Born: Francisco Veredas Bandeiras; 2 May 1945 (age 80)
- Origin: Elvas, Portugal
- Genres: Fado
- Occupations: Singer-songwriter, Guitar player
- Instruments: Singer, guitar
- Years active: 1973 –present

Francisco Veredas Bandeiras, better known as Paco Bandeira, (born 2 May 1945, Elvas, Portugal) is a singer and musician from Portugal.

He is known for representing his country in the second edition of the OTI Festival in 1973 which was held in Belo Horizonte.

In early 2012 he was accused by the Public Prosecutor's Office of domestic violence against his ex-wife, Maria Roseta Ferreira.

In July 2012, he was sentenced to a suspended sentence of three years and four months for domestic violence and possession of a prohibited weapon. The sentence was upheld by the Lisbon Court of Appeal upon appeal.

Awards and achievements
Preceded by Tonicha with "Glória, glória, aleluia"	Portugal in the OTI Festival; 1973	Succeeded by Paulo de Carvalho with "Amor sem palavras"
