= Colombia in the OTI Festival =

- OTI Festival
- Participating broadcaster: Caracol Televisión; Producciones Nacionales Colombianas de Hoy (PUNCH); Radio Televisión Interamericana (RTI); RCN Televisión; Producciones JES; Datos y Mensajes

Participation summary
- Appearances: 27
- First appearance: 1972
- Last appearance: 1998
- Highest placement: 2nd in 1991
- Participation history: 1972; 1973; 1974; 1975; 1976; 1977; 1978; 1979; 1980; 1981; 1982; 1983; 1984; 1985; 1986; 1987; 1988; 1989; 1990; 1991; 1992; 1993; 1994; 1995; 1996; 1997; 1998; 2000

The participation of Colombia in the OTI Festival began at the first OTI Festival in 1972. The Colombian participating broadcasters were programadoras Caracol Televisión, Producciones Nacionales Colombianas de Hoy (PUNCH), Radio Televisión Interamericana (RTI), RCN Televisión, Producciones JES, and Datos y Mensajes, which were members of the Organización de Televisión Iberoamericana (OTI). They participated in twenty-seven of the twenty-eight editions, only missing the 2000 festival. Their best result in the festival was second achieved in 1991.

== History ==
The programadoras Caracol Televisión, Producciones Nacionales Colombianas de Hoy (PUNCH), and Radio Televisión Interamericana (RTI), joined in 1986 by RCN Televisión, Producciones JES, and Datos y Mensajes, participated together in the OTI Festival representing Colombia; broadcasting the event in the country through Inravisión. They selected their entry for the festival through either a televised national competition or internally.

During the Colombian history in this festival, they got two third places, in 1975 with "Campesino de ciudad" by Leonor González Mina and in 1973 with "Tu pueblo y mi pueblo" by Jaime Mora. They also managed to get the second place in 1991 with "Consejos, canción a mi hijo" by Juan Carlos Coronel.

In 1992 Shakira was initially considered to represent Colombia in the festival but she could not compete because she was under age.

== Participation overview ==
Table key
2	Second place
3	Third place
SF	Semi-finalist
◇	Contest cancelled

Year	Song	Artist	Songwriter(s)	Conductor	Place	Points
1972	"Volverás a mis brazos"	Christopher	Eduardo Cabas de la Espriella; Armando Velázquez	Armando Velázquez	9	3
1973	"Una orquídea, un amor"	Claudia Osuna	Alfonso de la Espriella	Jimmy Salcedo	9	3
1974	"Porque soy la mujer, esperé por ti"	Isadora	Luis Gabriel Naranjo	Chucho Ferrer	15	1
1975	"Campesino de ciudad"	Leonor González Mina	Eduardo Cabas; Alfonso de la Espirella	Armando Velásquez	3	10
1976	"Son de tambores"	Amparito	Germán Espinosa; Francisco Zumaqué; Joe Madrid; Jimmy Salcedo	Jimmy Salcedo	4	9
1977	"Cantando"	Ximena	Raúl Rosero Polo	Diego Rodríguez	14	1
1978	"Joven"	Billy Pontoni	Eduardo Cabas	Alberto Nieto	16	1
1979	"A cualquier hora"	Paola	Evelina Porto de Mejía	Mario Cuesta	18	2
1980	"¿Por cuánto tiempo?"	Jaime Valencia	Henry Laguado; Jaime Valencia	Armando Velázquez	11	13
1981	"Si nací por amor, yo nací para amar"	Jaime D'Alberto	Jaime D'Alberto		5	18
1982	"Así"	Blanco y Negro	Fernando Garavito	Raúl Rosero Polo	9	18
1983	"Tu pueblo y mi pueblo"	Jaime Mora	Víctor Manuel García; Santander Díaz	Álvaro Ortiz	3	—N/a
1984	"Por lo que habías jurado"	Christopher y Ximena	Carlos González	Mario Agustín Cuesta Domínguez	—N/a	
1985	"Mi señora campesina"	Grupo Café	Raúl Rosero Polo	Raúl Rosero Polo	—N/a	
1986	"Ausencia"	Noemí	Alfonso de la Estriella	Carlos Montoya	—N/a	
1987	"Vengan a mi hogar"	Marta Patricia Yepes	Marta Patricia Yepes; Amado Jaén	Josep Mas Portet	—N/a	
1988	"Latinoamérica"	Harold Orozco	Harold Orozco	Jaime Rodríguez	7	6
1989	"El artista"	Yolanda González	Cristian Vega Riveros	Cristian Vega Riveros	—N/a	
1990	"Más que a mi madre"	Daniel Abadía	Álex González	Mario Cuesta	—N/a	
1991	"Consejos, canción a mi hijo"	Juan Carlos Coronel	Conrado Marrugo Vélez	Chucho Ferrer	2	—N/a
1992	"Yo no sé si estoy de moda"	Alexandra Villar	Socorro Delgado; Diego Delgado		—N/a	
1993	"Como volver a amar"	Alexa Hernández	Marcelo Cezán	José Fabra	—N/a	
1994	"Quiero saber"	Jorge Hernán Baena	Francesco		SF	—N/a
1995	"Sólo por hoy"	César Mora	César Mora	Milton Salcedo	—N/a	
1996	"Eres"	Duo Voz en Off	Daniel Betancourt	Claudio Jácome Harb	—N/a	
1997	"Mis amigos"	Andrés Cabas			SF	—N/a
1998	"Amor por Latinoamérica"	Natalia Ramírez	Nelson Osorio; Jaime Valencia	Diego Delgado	SF	—N/a
1999	Contest cancelled ◇					
2000	Did not participate					
