= Colombia in the OTI Festival 1974 =

- OTI Festival 1974
- Participating broadcasters: Caracol Televisión; Producciones Nacionales Colombianas de Hoy (PUNCH); Radio Televisión Interamericana (RTI)
- Country: Colombia
- Selection process: National OTI Festival
- Selection date: 9 October 1974

Competing entry
- Song: "Porque soy la mujer, esperé por ti"
- Artist: Isadora
- Songwriter: Luis Gabriel Naranjo

Placement
- Final result: 15th, 1 vote

Participation chronology
◄1973 •	1974	• 1975►

Colombia was represented at the OTI Festival 1974 with the song "Porque soy la mujer, esperé por ti", written by Luis Gabriel Naranjo, and performed by Isadora. The Colombian participating broadcasters, programadoras Caracol Televisión, Producciones Nacionales Colombianas de Hoy (PUNCH), and Radio Televisión Interamericana (RTI), selected their entry through a national competition. The song, that was performed in position 18, placed fifteenth out of 19 competing entries tying with the songs from Panama and the United States with 1 vote.

== National stage ==
Programadoras Caracol Televisión, Producciones Nacionales Colombianas de Hoy (PUNCH), and Radio Televisión Interamericana (RTI) held a national televised competition to select their entry for the 3rd edition of the OTI Festival.

Competing entries on the National OTI Festival – Colombia 1974 (Note: Incomplete list of the competing entries.)
Song	Artist	Songwriter(s)
"Caperucita siglo XX"		
"Concierto a un amor"	Henry Mejía	Daniel Moncada
"Israel, Israel"	Lukas	
"La historia de Pedro y Rosita"	Luis Gabriel	
"Porque soy la mujer, esperé por ti"	Isadora	Luis Gabriel Naranjo
"Vivir y morir de amor"	Fausto	
	Blanca Luz	
	Leonardo	

=== Final ===
The final was held on Wednesday 9 October 1974. The winner was "Porque soy la mujer, esperé por ti", written by Luis Gabriel Naranjo, and performed by Isadora.

Winner

Result of the final of the National OTI Festival – Colombia 1974
R/O	Song	Artist	Result
	"Caperucita siglo XX"		
	"Concierto a un amor"	Henry Mejía	
	"Israel, Israel"	Lukas	
	"La historia de Pedro y Rosita"	Luis Gabriel	
	"Porque soy la mujer, esperé por ti"	Isadora	1
	"Vivir y morir de amor"	Fausto	
		Blanca Luz	
		Leonardo	

== At the OTI Festival ==
On 26 October 1974, the OTI Festival was held at the Teatro Juan Ruiz de Alarcón of the Centro de Convenciones in Acapulco, hosted by Televisa, and broadcast live throughout Ibero-America. Isadora performed "Porque soy la mujer, esperé por ti" in position 18, with Chucho Ferrer conducting the event's orchestra, and placing fifteenth out of 19 competing entries tying with the songs from Panama and the United States with 1 vote.

The festival was broadcast live by the programadoras on Inravisión's Primera Cadena.

=== Voting ===
Each participating broadcaster, or group of broadcasters that jointly participated representing a country, assembled a five-member jury, which each member voting for its favourite song.

Votes awarded to Colombia
Score	Country
1 vote	Honduras

Votes awarded by Colombia
Score	Country
2 votes	Guatemala; Puerto Rico
1 vote	Spain
