= Agenda De Baile =

Agenda de Baile

Studio album by Camilo Sesto
- Released: October 15, 1986
- Recorded: 1986
- Studio: Torres Sonido
- Genre: Latin pop
- Length: 32:36
- Label: RCA Ariola
- Producer: Camilo Blanes

Camilo Sesto chronology
Tuyo (1986)	Agenda de Baile (1986)	A Voluntad del Cielo (1991)

Agenda de Baile (Dancing schedule) is the 18th studio album by Spanish singer-songwriter Camilo Sesto, It was released by RCA Ariola. The album was produced by Sesto and included ten songs written by Camilo Sesto. The album was the last one before Sesto's five-year sabbatical.

== Track listing ==
All tracks written by Camilo Blanes.

No.	Title	Length
1.	"Me Lo Estás Poniendo Difícil"	3:33
2.	"Precisamente Tú"	2:44
3.	"Porqué Me Tratas Así"	2:50
4.	"Ponle Precio A Tu Amor"	3:05
5.	"Quererte A Tí"	4:03
6.	"México"	3:52
7.	"Más Allá"	2:16
8.	"Soledad En Soledad"	3:22
9.	"No Hay Edad"	3:07
10.	"Amor Brujo"	3:37
