= A Voluntad del Cielo =

Studio album by Camilo Sesto
- Released: October 15, 1991
- Recorded: 1991
- Studios: Som Livre Studios (Rio de Janeiro, Brazil); Torres Sonidos (Parquelagos, Madrid, Spain)
- Genre: Latin pop
- Length: 46:02
- Label: RCA Ariola
- Producer: Camilo Sesto · Augusto César

Camilo Sesto chronology
Agenda De Baile (1986)	A Voluntad del Cielo (1991)	Huracán de Amor (1992)

Singles from A Voluntad del Cielo
- 1. "Amor Mío, ¿Qué Me Has Hecho?" Released: August 19, 1991; 2. "Que Mala Vida" Released: December 23, 1991; 3. "Vuelve" Released: February 3, 1992

A Voluntad del Cielo (Heaven's Will) is 19th studio album recorded by Spanish singer-songwriter Camilo Sesto, It was released by RCA Ariola on October 15, 1991 (see 1991 in music). The album was produced by Sesto and Augusto César and included ten songs written by Sesto. The album was released five years after the self-imposed retirement of the artist in 1986 and includes his first number-one single in the Billboard Top Latin Songs chart, "Amor Mío, ¿Qué Me Has Hecho?".

A Voluntad del Cielo peaked at number one in the Billboard Latin Pop Albums chart. In Mexico the album was certified gold for 100,000 total units before the AMPROFON database - 1999.

== Track listing ==
All tracks written and performed by Camilo Blanes.

No.	Title	Length
1.	"Pecado Original"	4:34
2.	"Amor Mío, ¿Qué Me Has Hecho?"	5:54
3.	"Bienvenido Amor"	3:29
4.	"Vuelve"	4:48
5.	"Amores con Doble Vida"	4:32
6.	"El Meu Cor Es d'Alcoi"	5:29
7.	"Que Mala Vida"	4:51
8.	"Necesito un Amor"	4:30
9.	"Matar Por Nada"	4:34
10.	"Destinos Marcados"	4:07

== Chart performance ==
Chart (1991)	Peak position
US Billboard Latin Pop Albums	1

(C) MCMXCI. RCA Ariola. S.A. de C.V.
