= Tuyo (album) =

Studio album by Camilo Sesto
- Released: 1985
- Recorded: April to June 1985
- Genres: Pop rock; synthpop
- Length: 36:53
- Label: Ariola Records
- Producers: Camilo Sesto; Pepe Robles

Camilo Sesto chronology
Amanecer/84 (1983)	Tuyo (1985)	Agenda De Baile (1986)

Singles from Tuyo
- 1. "Ven o Voy" Released: September 1985; 2. "Tengo ganas de vivir" Released: December 1985; 3. "Mientras mi alma sienta" Released: December 1985

Tuyo (Yours) is the seventeenth studio album by Camilo Sesto. The first audio CD Cassette release was in 1985. Co-produced by P. Robles, the album contains three successful singles; beginning with, "Ven o Voy", as well as "tengo ganas de vivir", and "mientras mi alma sienta" which reached "The Billboard Top 40" at the time.

== Background ==
After the rush-release of 1983's Amanecer 84, Sesto would release a record the following year which was considered a "return to form". For the writing process, he started with very basic melodies, which then sparked the writing process. He recorded basic tracks live, in the hopes of communicating urgency and excitement. The advance in playing and production is evident in "Ven o Voy", which features various synth tones and textures, while pushing Sesto's voice further back into the mix. The mood changes for "Soy Un Loco Sincero", a melody which the near-40 Sesto seems to sing with a wistful look back at his youth. Another key track is "Cuando Digo Que No", a typical Sesto track, but one with seemingly better instrumentation backing his voice, which sings sharply, elucidating every syllable the way he did during the first few years of his solo career. Also important is "Mientras Mi Alma Sienta"; a track which contains an adaptation of a piece by legendary writer Tomaso Albioni.

== Track listing ==
No.	Title	Length
1.	"Contigo Soy Capaz De Todo"	2:52
2.	"Ven O Voy"	3:16
3.	"Soy Un Loco Sincero"	3:54
4.	"Has Nacido Para Mí"	3:58
5.	"Mientras Mi Alma Sienta"	5:19
6.	"Tengo Ganas De Vivir"	3:53
7.	"Extraños"	3:11
8.	"Cuando Digo Que No"	3:28
9.	"¿Quién Eres Tú?"	3:30
10.	"Maldito Destino"	3:53
Total length:		36:53

== Personnel ==
- Camilo Sesto – vocals, arrangement, production
- P. Robles – arrangement, production, guitar
- Alejandro Monroy, Carlos Villa – arrangement, synthesizers, pianos
- C. Blanes – arrangement
- Bruno Vidal, Joaquín Torres – bass
- Antonio Moreno – drums
- José María Castellví, Graf, S.L – photography
- Antonio Lax – design
