= Amor Mío, ¿Qué Me Has Hecho? =

"Amor mío, ¿qué me has hecho?"

Single by Camilo Sesto

from the album A Voluntad del Cielo
- Released: 19 August 1991
- Recorded: 1991
- Genre: Latin pop; latin ballad
- Length: 5:53
- Label: BMG International U.S. Latim
- Songwriter: Camilo Blanes
- Producer: Camilo Blanes · Augusto César

Camilo Sesto singles chronology
"Me la estás poniendo difícil" (1986)	"Amor mío, ¿qué me has hecho?" (1991)	"Qué mala vida" (1992)

"Amor mío, ¿qué me has hecho?" (English: My Love, What Have You Done with Me?) is a song performed by Spanish singer-songwriter Camilo Sesto. It was released as the lead single from his 19th studio album A Voluntad del Cielo (1991). The song was written and produced by Camilo Blanes with additional production by Augusto César and became Sesto's first number-one hit in the Billboard Hot Latin Tracks chart.

The song was released after the singer's temporary retirement from the music business in 1987 and was named "a good example of Sesto in its purest form, an interesting and well-built ballad, dressed with good sax interventions" by La Fonoteca on their review of the album A Voluntad del Cielo.

The track debuted in the Billboard Top Latin Songs chart (formerly Hot Latin Tracks) chart at number 35 in the week of October 19, 1991, climbing to the top ten two weeks later. "Amor mío, ¿qué me has hecho?" peaked at number-one on November 23, 1991, replacing "Por Qué Será" by Italo-Venezuelan singer-songwriter Rudy La Scala and being succeeded by "Inolvidable" by Mexican recording artist Luis Miguel, nine weeks later. "Amor mío, ¿qué me has hecho?" ended 1992 as the sixth-best performing Latin single of the year in the United States and was nominated for Latin Pop Song of the Year at the Lo Nuestro Awards of 1992 and the American Society of Composers, Authors and Publishers Awards of 1993, respectively.

== See also ==
- List of number-one Billboard Hot Latin Tracks of 1991
- Billboard Top Latin Songs Year-End Chart
