= Mario Gareña =

Colombian singer and composer (1932–2021)

- Born: Jesús Arturo García Peña; 25 September 1932; Barranquilla, Colombia
- Died: 25 August 2021 (aged 88); Salt Lake City, Utah, United States
- Occupations: Singer; Composer

Mario Gareña, stage name of Jesús Arturo García Peña (25 September 1932 – 25 August 2021) was a Colombian singer and composer. He was one of the most prolific singers of cumbia music and was known for the song "Yo me llamo cumbia".

== Biography ==
Gareña was born on 25 September 1932 in Barranquilla. He started his career in 1951 and joined an orchestra in Cali. He then joined the Orquesta Sonolux in Medellín. During the 1960s, he moved to Bogotá and started a career as a singer, performing in nightclubs and appearing on television. He also appeared in the films Mares de pasión and Cumbia.

In 1966, Gareña was voted most popular singer in Colombia by Caracol Radio. In 1969, he recorded his most famous song, "Yo me llamo cumbia", which was covered by Leonor Gonzalez Mina. In 1970, he represented Colombia at the Festival Latinoamericano de la Canción de Nueva York with the song "Te dejo la ciudad sin mí", performed by Los Ángeles Negros. In 1978, he recorded another highly successful song, "Raza", which denounced racism towards Afro-Colombians. It reached great fame after a cover by Billo's Caracas Boys.

In the 1980s, Gareña appeared on television multiple times as a singer, but also as an actor in the telenovela Oro. His success led him to run in the 1990 Colombian presidential election. However, he only earned 2,411 votes, and left the music scene afterwards.

Mario Gareña died in Salt Lake City on 25 August 2021 at the age of 88.
