= Amaneciendo =

Studio album by Camilo Sesto
- Released: 1980
- Genre: Baroque pop; Latin ballad
- Length: 39:38
- Label: Ariola Records
- Producer: Camilo Sesto

Camilo Sesto chronology
| Horas de amor (1979) | Amaneciendo (1980) | Más y Más (1981) |

Singles from Amaneciendo
- 1. "Perdóname" Released: 1980; 2. "Donde Estés Con Quien Estés" Released: 1980

Amaneciendo (Dawning) is the thirteenth studio album by Camilo Sesto. The first audio Cassette was released in 1980. The album contains two of his most successful singles of his career. The album is ranked 7th in Argentina and 5th in Spain where it becomes gold record for more than 150,000 records sold.

"Perdóname" ranked on the Billboard Top 40 for 18 consecutive weeks. In addition, "Donde Estés Con Quien Estés", "Un Amor No Muere Así Como Así", "Días De Vino y De Rosas", "Vivir Sin Ti", and "Samba" had their first place in some countries that were published as singles.

== Background ==
Leaving his fans with a formally impeccable performance and a handful of songs that had hardly evolved in ten years from his previous album. By the end of 1980, Camilo Sesto released, what to become his most successful album to date, yet the most foreign to what was around "Latin music" at the time. Hymns and more introspective ballads were unheard of, yet was made with "little inspiration". This album is led by the hits such as "Perdóname", "Un Amor No Muere Así Como Así", "Amor A Plena Luz", "Tres Veces No", "Que Nos Pasa Esta Mañana", and "Donde Estés Con Quien Estés". Though, Camilo turns into a party ball that crosses the bitter ocean in the latter half of the album, none of which songs were promoted, nor known at the time.

== Track listing ==
Side one
| No. | Title | Length |
|---|---|---|
| 1. | "Perdóname" | 3:56 |
| 2. | "Un Amor No Muere Así Como Así" | 4:00 |
| 3. | "Mis Sueños" | 3:29 |
| 4. | "Amor A Plena Luz" | 3:42 |
| 5. | "Donde Estés, Con Quien Estés" | 4:37 |

Side two
| No. | Title | Length |
|---|---|---|
| 6. | "Días De Vino y De Rosas" | 3:18 |
| 7. | "Tres Veces No" | 3:21 |
| 8. | "Vivir Sin Ti" | 3:53 |
| 9. | "Samba" | 4:26 |
| 10. | "Que Nos Pasa Esta Mañana" | 4:57 |
| Total length: | | 39:38 |

== Personnel ==
- Camilo Sesto – vocals, arrangement, production
- D'Arneill Pershing, Juan Carlos Calderón – arrangement
- Trevor Bastow – vocals, arrangement, directed
- Alcatraz – backing band
- Andrea Bronston, Nina Swan, Susana de las Heras – vocals, arrangement
- J. M. Castellví – photography
