= Lolita Ayala =

Mexican broadcast journalist

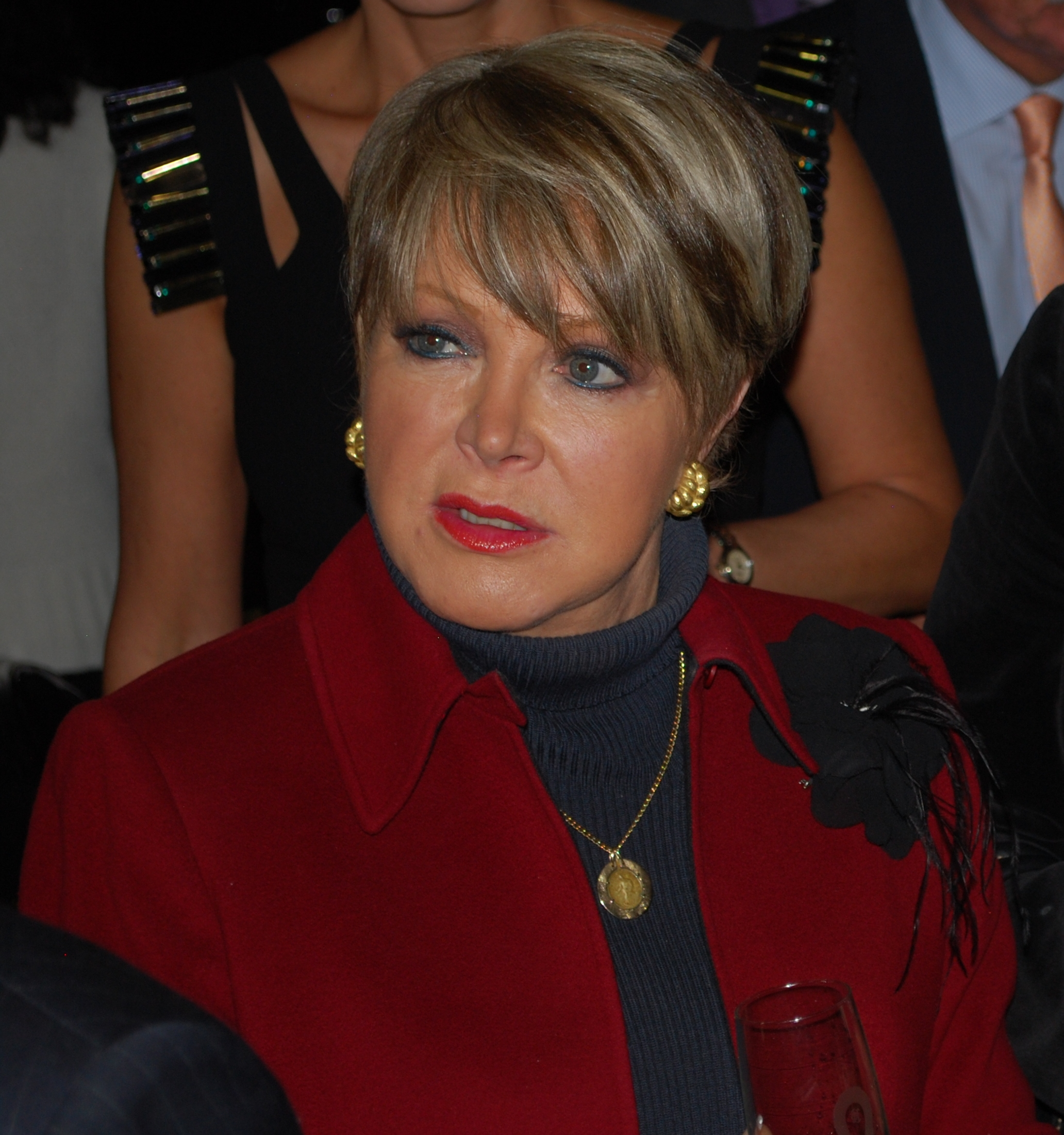
- Ayala in 2012
- Born: Dolores Ayala Nieto; May 20, 1951 (age 75); Mexico City, Mexico
- Occupation: Broadcast journalist
- Years active: 1971–2017
- Organization: Sólo por Ayudar
- Television: El Noticiero con Lolita Ayala, La Línea de la Salud
- Children: 2

Dolores "Lolita" Ayala Nieto (born May 20, 1951) is a Mexican journalist and philanthropist from Mexico City. She began her career in television journalism in the early 1970s, at a time when no woman headed a news or informational program in Mexico. In 1974, she was asked to host a segment of the then-popular news show 24 Horas, hosted by Jacobo Zabludovsky, who became her mentor. In 1987, she became the main anchor of her own news program, now called El Noticiero con Lolita Ayala which has been on the air since. She also does health information videos for television. She is a member of ten social/charity organizations, with the most important of these being Sólo por Ayudar which she founded in 1985 and Comité Pro Animal which she co-founded in 1992.

== Early and personal life ==
Dolores Ayala Nieto, better known for her nickname Lolita Ayala, was born on May 20, 1951, in Mexico City. She came from a medical family. Her father, grandfather, uncles and cousins were doctors. She says she was taught by her parents to give to others as they organized charity works. She began college by studying medicine in the United States and then studied radio and television journalism in Rome.

She has been married three times but is single now. She has two children Anibal and Maria Luisa.

== Career ==
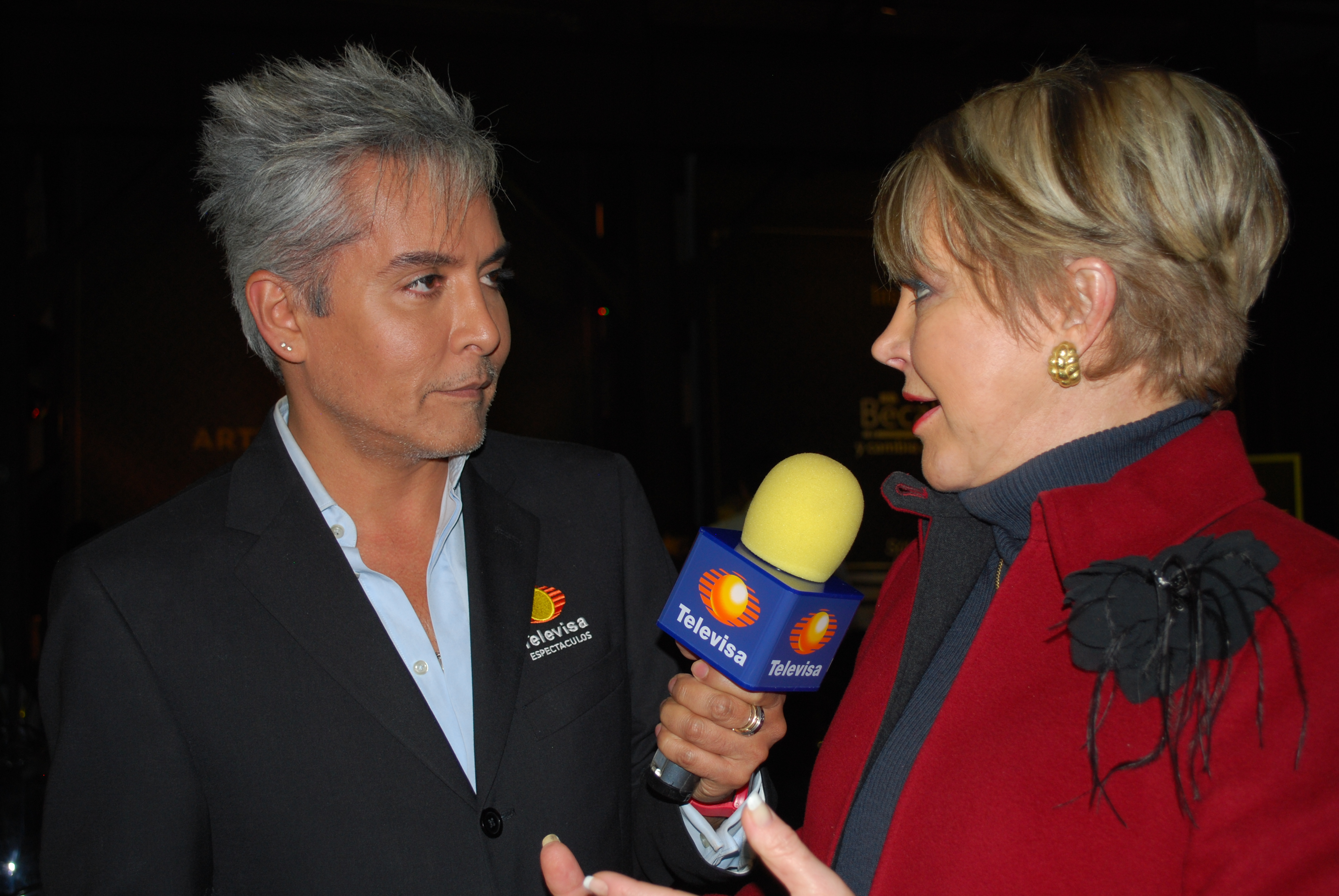
Interview with Lolita Ayala at the charity auction "Arte en Barricas" (Art in Barricas) sponsored by Tequila Herradura in Mexico City.

Ayala's journalism career began at Teleperiódico, part of the Notimex agency, working with them for sixteen years. In 1971 she appeared on television for the first time on Channel 8 in Mexico City. At that time there were no women in Mexico who headed a news or information show. From 1972 to 1974 she collaborated on news programs such as “En Punto” and “En contacto directo” as well as other kinds of programs such as “Adivine me chamba” and “Cada noche.”

In 1974 she was asked to anchor her own segment on the news show 24 Horas with Jacobo Zabludovsky, an important news show at that time. She worked with Zabludovsky and others on the show for the next twelve years. That year, she also presented, alongside Raul Velasco, the third edition of the OTI Festival, which was held in Acapulco.

In 1987, Zabludovsky retired and then the president of Televisa Miguel Alemán Velasco offered Ayala the head anchor position for a news show originally called Muchas noticias, later renamed El Noticiero con Lolita Ayala. This made her the first woman head anchor of an information show in Mexico. The show has been on the air since airing Monday to Friday for a half-hour in the afternoons. She has worked for Televisa for over forty years.

Her journalism work has been described as truthful, simple and avoiding yellow journalism and tabloid-like scandals. It is also noted for promoting several social values. In 2001, she hosted a special program for children to discuss the 9/11 attacks in the United States. In addition to Zabludovsky, she also worked with Emilio Azcárraga Milmo, Luis Spota and Paco Malgesto. She has covered stories such as the fall of the Berlin Wall, the death of John Paul II, the Zapatista uprising, and the assassination of Luis Donaldo Colosio.

She also hosts a series of short informational videos for television called La Línea de la Salud, which deals with various health topics of concern to Mexico, such as self-medication. These generally consist of her interviewing one or two experts on a subject, as well as short segments on important points and life stories.

== Philanthropic work ==
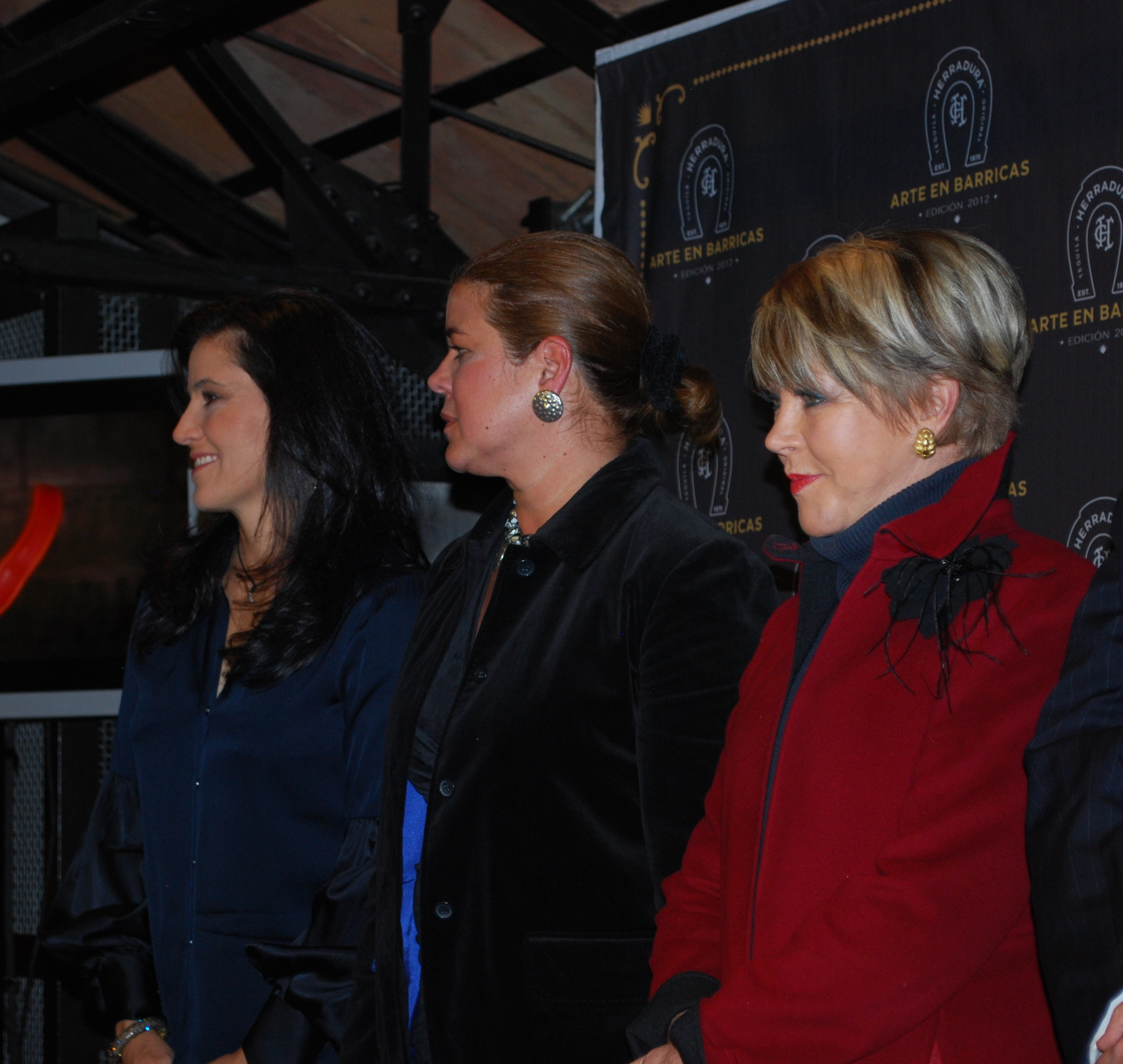
Ayala (right) representing the Sólo por Ayudar organization at the Arte en Barricas event in Mexico City

Ayala is also noted for her philanthropic and social work similar to that done by other journalists such as Rita Gánem, Virginia Sendel and Patricia Suárez. She states that it is her mission in life to work on social causes. She participates in ten such organizations such as Fondo para la Salud.

Her most significant philanthropic work is with the organization, Sólo por Ayudar, which she founded in 1985 after that year’s major earthquake in Mexico City to provide for various economic needs of Mexico by working with ten major programs, such as “Pro Ciego” in collaboration with other social organizations. It provides food and medical attention, including medicines and facilities to detect breast cancer. Ayala mainly acts as a spokesperson for Sólo por Ayudar's fundraising needs.

She is also a founder and the president of the Comité Pro Animal, which works to combat animal cruelty, to provide access to vaccines and to promote sterilization of pets to cut down on the number of animals euthanized in shelters.

== Recognitions ==
Over her career, Ayala has received numerous recognitions in Mexico and abroad. One major award was the Women’s Cross of the Order of Malta in 2001. Recent awards include a bust of her at the Parque de los Periodistas Ilustres in Mexico City (2008), the Mujeres de Excelencia award (2010) and the Vida Vibrante and Corazón de Plata awards for her philanthropic and journalism work (2012).

Solo por Ayudar was recognized for its work by the Casa de la América Latina in Monte Carlo.
