= Algo Más (Camilo Sesto song) =

Single by Camilo Sesto

from the album Camilo Sesto
- Language: Spanish
- B-side: "Sin Remedio"
- Released: 1973
- Length: 3:12
- Label: Ariola
- Songwriter: Camilo Sesto
- Producer: Juan Carlos Calderón

Music video
- "Algo Más" on YouTube

OTI Festival 1973 entry
- Country: Spain
- Language: Spanish
- Conductor: Juan Carlos Calderón

Finals performance
- Final result: 5th
- Final votes: 6

Entry chronology
- ◄ "Niña" (1972)
- "Lapicero de madera" (1974) ►

"Algo Más" (Something More) is a 1973 song written and recorded by Spanish singer Camilo Sesto, arranged by Juan Carlos Calderón. It represented Spain in the second edition of the OTI Festival placing fifth. The song reached No. 1 on the Spanish charts for ten weeks. The B-side, "Sin Remedio", was also written by Sesto and arranged by Johnny Arthey.

== Background ==
Televisión Española (TVE) internally selected "Algo Más", composed and recorded by Camilo Sesto, as its entrant for the second edition of the OTI Festival. On 10 November 1973, the festival was held at the Palácio das Artes in Belo Horizonte, hosted by Rede Tupi, produced by its affiliate TV Itacolomi, and broadcast live throughout Ibero-America, Portugal, and Spain. Sesto performed "Algo Más" third on the evening. Juan Carlos Calderón conducted the event's live orchestra in the performance of the entry. At the end of voting, the song had received six points, placing fifth.

== Commercial performance ==
The song reached No. 1 on the Spanish charts for ten weeks from 26 November 1973 to 28 January 1974.
