= Andrés do Barro =

Spanish musician

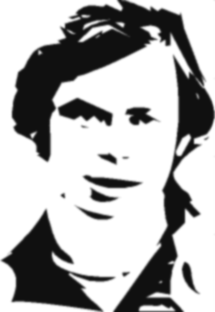
- Born: October 1, 1947. Ferrol, Spain
- Died: December 22, 1989 (aged 42); Madrid, Spain
- Citizenship: Spanish
- Occupation: Singer-songwriter

Andrés Lapique do Barro, known as Andres do Barro (1 October 1947 – 22 December 1989), was a Galician singer-songwriter. He is the only singer who has reached number 1 in Spain with a song written in Galician.

== Biography ==
Andrés do Barro was born in Ferrol, A Coruña, into a family linked to the Spanish Navy, but he chose to devote himself to music. He was the son of a colonel in the Quartermaster's Office of the Navy and studied in the Merchant Navy, which he did not finish.

He composed by ear, with his guitar. He was enthusiastic in his desire to tell simple stories of his land. At the time, in the midst of Franco's dictatorship, he was supported by Pilar Franco, the dictator's sister, and Juan Pardo, his producer, which explains why he was allowed to sing in Galician.

He was one of the first singers to use Galician as a means of expression during the Franco regime. He is the author of hits such as "O tren" (Camilo Sesto participated in the choirs) or "Corpiño xeitoso". This last song, published in 1970 and sung in the Galician language, reached number one on the Spanish charts. Until now, no one has managed to do so in an official language other than Spanish.

He starred, together with Concha Velasco and under the orders of Mariano Ozores, in the film En la red de mi canción, shot in Spanish, and his voice was replaced by that of a professional dubbing actor; his songs, however, were played in their original Galician version. He went on to perform in Mexico and Brazil.

After his initial successes, he was unable to sustain himself and emigrated to Mexico in 1976. After his return he also failed to make a name for himself in the Spanish music world. He died of liver cancer at the age of 42 in Madrid.

In 2015 Fernando Fernández Rego published a biography of the Ferrol-born musician Saudade. Andrés do Barro: El músico que llevó el pop gallego al número uno de ventas (Saudade. Andrés do Barro: The musician who brought Galician pop to number one on ventas), with the collaboration of the musician's family.

== Discography ==
- Me llamo Andrés Lapique do Barro (LP 1970)
- ¡Pum! (LP 1971)
- Andrés Do Barro (LP 1974)
