= Cecilia (Spanish singer) =

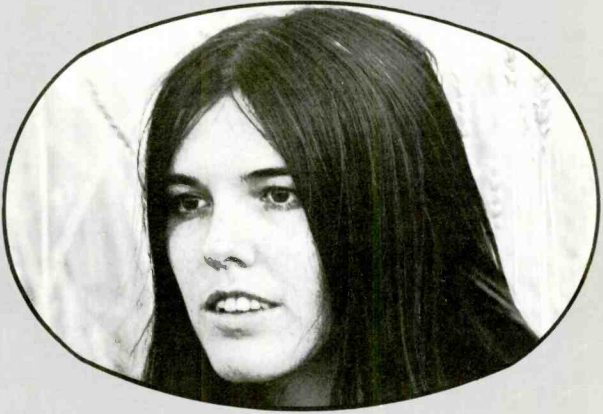
- Cecilia in 1974

Background information
- Born: Evangelina Sobredo Galanes; 11 October 1948; Madrid, Spain
- Died: 2 August 1976 (aged 27) Colinas de Trasmonte, Castile and León, Spain
- Cause of death: Car crash
- Genres: Folk; pop; canción melódica
- Instruments: Voice; guitar; darboukas
- Years active: 1970–1976
- Labels: CBS; Epic

Evangelina Sobredo Galanes, known as Cecilia, (11 October 1948 – 2 August 1976) was a Spanish singer-songwriter. She took her stage name from the song "Cecilia" by Simon and Garfunkel.

== Biography ==
The daughter of diplomats, she was born in Madrid, spent her childhood in several countries (Spain, The United Kingdom, The United States, Jordan, Portugal) and was raised by an American nun. She attained a bachelor's degree in law in Spain before deciding to dedicate herself to music and composition. Her ironic and lyrical songs, sung in a tiny voice, contributed to the existentialist and feminist movements of Spanish canciones protestas (protest songs) of the 1960s and 1970s.

=== Career ===
Her first steps in the music field were with the group Expresión, featuring Ignacio Sáenz de Tejada and Julio Seijasa. She wrote and sang in English. This band only published a single in 1970. In 1971 she signed up a contract as a solo artist with CBS-Spain. Julio Seijas remained as a collaborative musician on Cecilia´s band. She tried to launch her career as 'Eva' but that name was already registered and in use by another Madrilenian artist. The CBS-Spain label had released Simon and Garfunkel´s hit "Cecilia" and Evangelina took on that stage name.

During her musical career as Cecilia, she released 3 LPs and 9 singles that were very well received by the Spanish public. Cecilia was also a successful artist in Latin America. Her recordings were released in most Latin-speaking countries. She performed live in Colombia, Venezuela, and Puerto Rico. In 1975, she represented Spain in the fourth edition of the OTI Festival with the song "Amor de medianoche", placing second. In 1976, she was working on several artistic projects, such as a tribute to poet Ramón del Valle-Inclán and launching her music career in the U.S. She was also developing some work as a musical producer.

== Death ==
On 2 August 1976 Cecilia and members of her band: Carlos Manuel de la Iglesia, José Luis González González, and Carlos Albert Vizzaiello, drove back to Madrid after a concert in Vigo, Galicia. Early in the morning, they were involved in a car crash at Tres Montes Hill, in the province of Zamora. She, along with Iglesia, died. She was buried in the Madrilenian Cementerio de la Almudena.

=== Style and influences ===
While Spanish singer songwriters such as Mari Trini or Joan Manuel Serrat followed French influences, Cecilia introduced a new style in the 1970s. She brought and combined into her music her American and Middle East experiences and also looked into Spanish folk tradition and literature. She sang in English and Spanish. Cecilia was influenced by The Beatles, Paul Simon, Bob Dylan and Joan Baez as she said in several press interviews. She performed and recorded songs of these artists. Her first single as "Cecilia" featured the song "Reuníos" asking The Beatles to get back together as a group. The front cover of her first album Cecilia shows Evangelina wearing a boxing glove, a clear reference to Paul Simon's song "The Boxer".

Cecilia wrote and recorded her own compositions in her studio recordings. The only exceptions are "Lost little thing", cover of Lennon and McCartney's "Dear Prudence" and "Amor de Medianoche" by Juan Carlos Calderón and Evangelina Sobredo. She composed about 70 songs. The exact number is unknown because some materials remain unpublished. She also wrote several songs for other Spanish artists such as Julio Iglesias, Massiel, Simone or Mocedades. She cultivated other artistic fields beside music: poetry, painting and potteryware.

=== Censorship ===
Like many other artists in Spain, Cecilia had to deal with the censorship of General Franco´s government. Some lyrics and photographs from the albums had to be slightly altered or even removed to be approved. Those elements with references to feminism or to the Spanish Civil War were specially conflictuous. The song "Un millón de muertos" ("A million dead") after being altered and presented as "Un millón de sueños" ("A million dreams") was not approved to be played on the radio ("No radiable"). Cecilia 2 was the name that replaced "Me quedaré soltera" ("I will remain single") as the album title due to the feminism behind that statement. The front cover of the record, originally showing a pregnant Cecilia, was promptly removed by the record company. The super-hit "Mi querida España" had some words deleted on the final version to minimize subtle references to the Civil War and the end of the dictatorship. However, the authentic lyrics made it to print and came out in the inner side of the gatefold cover of the album.

=== Legacy ===
There have been posthumous compilations and a re-edition of her songs sung by famous artists like Merche Corisco, Miguel Bosé, Ana Belén, Manolo Tena, and Julio Iglesias in 1996. Some of her songs such as "A bunch of violets" and "Dama, dama" have been covered by many artists worldwide: Rocío Dúrcal, David Broza, Manzanita, Natalia Oreiro, Fangoria, Amaral and Pablo Milanés among many others.

== Discography ==
=== Singles ===
A total of 11 singles were published during Cecilia's life. 6 of her songs hit the number 1 on Spanish best-selling and radio charts: "Dama, Dama", "Nada de nada", "Andar", "Un ramito de violetas", "Mi querida España" and "Amor de Medianoche". After her death, 3 more singles and a CD-single were released.

- "Try catch the sun" / "Have you ever had a blue day?", Expresión, featuring Nacho Sáez de Tejada (Nuestro Pequeño Mundo) and Julio Seijas
- "Mañana" / "Reuníos", 1971
- "Fui"/" Dama, Dama", 1972
- "Nada de nada" / "Mi gata Luna",1972
- "Andar" / "Me quedaré soltera", 1973
- "Canción de amor" / "Un millón de sueños", 1973
- "Un ramito de violetas" / "La primera comunión", 1974
- "Mi querida España" / "Nuestra tierra", 1975
- "Amor de medianoche" / "Decir adiós", 1975
- "Tú y yo" / "Una guerra", 1976
- "A million reasons" / "Come the wind", 1976 (Only released in the USA)
- "El viaje" / "Lluvia", 1976
- "Doña Estefaldina" / "Nana del prisionero", 1983
- "El juego de la vida" / "Lady in the limousine",1983
- "Desde que tú te has ido", 1996 (only CD-single)

=== LPs ===
- Cecilia, 1972. Track list: "Fui", "Dama, Dama", "Señor y dueño", "Mi gata Luna", "Llora", "Portraits and Pictures", "Al son del clarín", "Canción de desamor", "Fauna", "Mama don´t you cry", "Nada de nada", "Lost little thing".
- Cecilia 2, 1973. Track list: "Andar", "Me quedaré soltera", "Si no fuera porque...", "Con los ojos en paz", "Canción de amor", "Un millón de sueños", "Cuando yo era pequeña", "Me iré de aquí", "Mi ciudad", "Equilibrista".
- Un ramito de violetas 1975. Track list: "Mi querida España", "Decir adiós", "Sevilla", "La primera comunión", "Nuestro cuarto", "Esta tierra", "Mi pobre piano", "Un ramito de violetas", "Don Roque", "Tu retrato".
- Amor de Medianoche, 1975. A greatest hits collection, released because of the OTI Festival. The voice was newly recorded in all songs except "Un ramito de violetas". All songs were remixed. "Llora" was taken half step lower, so the song sounds slower and has longer timing than the original mix. Track list: "Amor de medianoche", "Andar", "Un ramito de violetas", "Nada de nada", "Un millón de sueños", "Mi querida España", "Fui", "Señor y dueño", "Llora", "Dama, dama".

=== Later collections ===
- Canciones inéditas, 1983. Posthumous album that includes unpublished songs and discarded materials from previous recordings. Track list: "El juego de la vida", "Doña Estefaldina", "Lady in the limousine", "Tocan a muerto", "Nana del prisionero", "Perdimos algo", "El Testamento", "Como puede vivir", "Sister of the sand", "Quiero vivir palabras", "Soldadito de plomo", "Between the blinds".
- 20 Grandes canciones, 1990
- Desde que tú te has ido, 1996
- Un millón de sueños, 2007
- Cecilia inédita en concierto, 2011. 2 CD´s/ 2 LP´s set featuring live radio performances of Cecilia, unpublished for 35 years.
- Mi Muñeca, 2013. Posthumous album that includes unpublished songs and uncensored versions of her greatest hits.

== Bibliography ==
- Madrid, José: Equilibrista, la vida de Cecilia. Madrid, Ocho y medio, 2011 ISBN 978-84-96582-76-7
