= OTI Festival 1974 =

3rd OTI Song Festival

Date and venue
- Final: 26 October 1974
- Venue: Teatro Juan Ruiz de Alarcón; Centro de Convenciones; Acapulco, Mexico

Organization
- Organizer: Organización de Televisión Iberoamericana (OTI)
- Supervisor: Amaury Daumas
- Host broadcaster: Televisa
- Musical director: Chucho Ferrer
- Presenters: Raúl Velasco; Lolita Ayala

Participants
- Number of entries: 19
- Debuting countries: Ecuador; El Salvador; Guatemala; Honduras; Nicaragua; Netherlands Antilles; United States
- Non-returning countries: Argentina; Portugal
- Participation map: Participating countries Countries that participated in the past but not in 1974

Vote
- Voting system: Each country had 5 jurors and each of them voted for their favorite entry.
- Winning song: Puerto Rico "Hoy canto por cantar"

OTI Festival 1974 (Spanish: Tercer Gran Premio de la Canción Iberoamericana, Portuguese: Terceiro Grande Prêmio da Canção Ibero-Americana) was the third edition of the OTI Festival, held on 26 October 1974 at the Teatro Juan Ruiz de Alarcón of the Centro de Convenciones in Acapulco, Mexico, and presented by Raúl Velasco and Lolita Ayala. It was organised by the Organización de Televisión Iberoamericana (OTI) and host broadcaster Televisa, who staged the event after winning the 1973 festival for Mexico with the song "Que alegre va María" by Imelda Miller.

Broadcasters from nineteen countries participated in the festival, seven of them making their debut. The winner was the song "Hoy canto por cantar", written by Ricardo Ceratto and Nydia Caro, and performed by Caro herself representing Puerto Rico; with "Yo soy", written and performed by Tanya Zea representing Guatemala, placing second; and "Vuelve", written by Pablo Schneider, and performed by José Luis Rodríguez representing Venezuela, placing third.

== Location ==
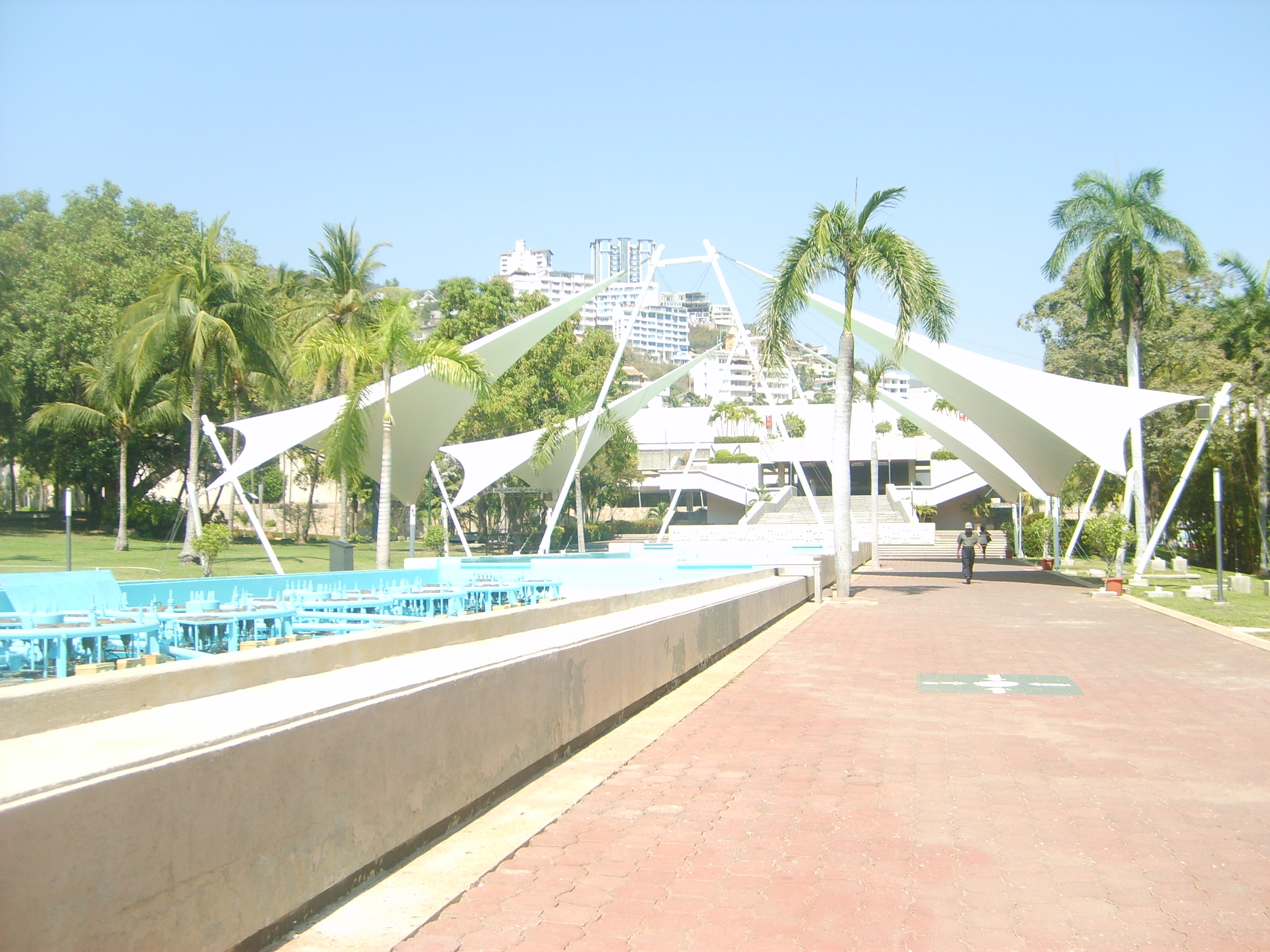
Centro de Convenciones, Acapulco – host venue of the OTI Festival 1974.

According to the rules of the OTI Festival at the time, the winning broadcaster of the previous edition would host the festival the following year. The Organización de Televisión Iberoamericana (OTI) designated Televisa, which was the winning broadcaster of the previous edition with the song "Que alegre va María" by Imelda Miller representing Mexico, as the host broadcaster of the 1974 edition.

The broadcaster staged the event in Acapulco, instead of Mexico City, as was initially planned. The venue selected was the Teatro Juan Ruiz de Alarcón of the Centro de Convenciones. This theatre was a highly vanguardist building opened in 1973 with a seating capacity for over 2,000 people.

== Participants ==
Broadcasters from nineteen countries participated in this edition of the OTI Festival. The OTI members, public or private broadcasters from Spain, and eighteen Spanish and Portuguese speaking countries of Ibero-America signed up for the festival. From the countries that participated in the previous edition, Argentina and Portugal decided to withdraw, while seven countries made their debut: Ecuador, El Salvador, Guatemala, Honduras, Nicaragua, Netherlands Antilles, and the United States. This caused the number of participants to increase from 14 to 19 countries in one year.

Some of the participating broadcasters, such as those representing Colombia, Guatemala, and Mexico, selected their entries through their regular national televised competitions. Other broadcasters decided to select their entry internally.

One performing artist had represented the same country previously: Orlando Morales had represented Panama in 1973. Gee Karlshonn was the first female conductor in the contest's history when she led the orchestra during the Panamanian entry.

Participants of the OTI Festival 1974
Country	Broadcaster(s)	Song	Artist	Songwriter(s)	Language	Conductor
Bolivia	TVB	"Los muros"	Jenny	Javier Jorquera; Juliano	Spanish	Javier Jorquera
Brazil	Rede Tupi	"Porque?"	Agnaldo Rayol	Sílvio César	Portuguese; Spanish	Poncho Pérez
Chile	TVN	"Amor, volveré"	José Alfredo Fuentes	José Alfredo Fuentes	Spanish	Chucho Ferrer
Colombia	Caracol Televisión; PUNCH; RTI	"Porque soy la mujer, esperé por ti"	Isadora	Luis Gabriel Naranjo	Spanish	Chucho Ferrer
Dominican Republic	Color Visión	"Alexandra"	Charytín Goyco	Charytín Goyco	Spanish	Jorge Taveras
Ecuador	Ecuavisa	"Las tres mariposas"	Hilda Murillo	Romeo Caicedo; Héctor Garrido	Spanish	Chucho Ferrer
El Salvador		"Todo será de nosotros"	Félix López	Félix López	Spanish	Chucho Ferrer
Guatemala	Canal 3; Canal 7; Canal 11	"Yo soy"	Tanya Zea	Tanya Zea	Spanish	Roberto Porter
Honduras		"Río viejo, viejo amigo"	Moisés Canelo	Horacio Cadalso	Spanish	Jorge Ortega
Mexico	Televisa	"Quijote"	Enrique Cáceres	Roberto Cantoral	Spanish	Ramón Flores
Netherlands Antilles	ATM	"Quédate"	Humberto Nivi	Humberto Nivi	Spanish	Aníbal Abreu
Nicaragua	Telenica; Televicentro	"Gaviota"	Hernaldo Zúñiga	Hernaldo Zúñiga	Spanish	Chucho Ferrer
Panama	RPC-TV	"La tierra es de todos"	Orlando Morales and Marcos Rodríguez	Gee Karlshonn	Spanish	Gee Karlshonn
Peru		"Mujer primera"	César Altamirano	Juan Gonzalo Rose; César Calvo; Jorge Madueño	Spanish	Jorge Madueño
Puerto Rico	WKAQ-Telemundo	"Hoy canto por cantar"	Nydia Caro	Ricardo Ceratto; Nydia Caro	Spanish	Chucho Ferrer
Spain	TVE	"Lapicero de madera"	Lia Uyá	Lia Uyá	Spanish	Rafael Ibarbia
United States	SIN	"Pero... mi tierra"	Rosita Perú	Larry Martin; Leandro Blanco	Spanish	Larry Martin
Uruguay	SAETA	"La montaña de la vida"	María Elisa	Jorge da Trindade	Spanish	Chucho Ferrer
Venezuela		"Vuelve"	José Luis Rodríguez	Pablo Schneider	Spanish	Aníbal Abreu

== Festival overview ==
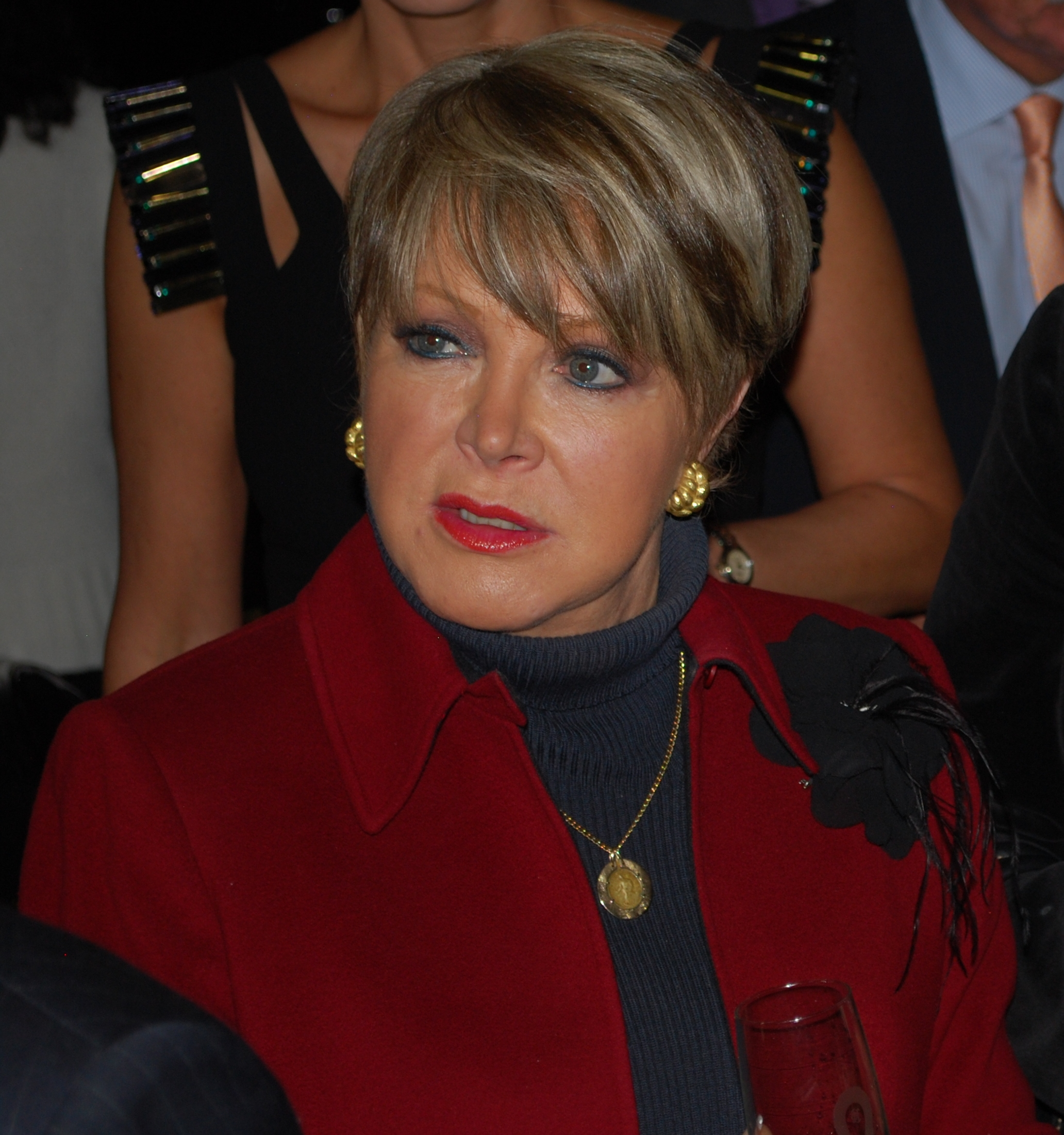
Lolita Ayala co-hosted the OTI Festival 1974.

The festival was held on Saturday 26 October 1974, beginning at 17:00 CST (23:00 UTC). It was presented by Raúl Velasco and Lolita Ayala. The musical director was Chucho Ferrer, who conducted the Acapulco Philharmonic Orchestra when required. The competing songs were accompanied by the singing group Hermanos Zavala as backing singers. The draw to determine the running order (R/O) was held on 6 October at the Televisa studios in Mexico City. The interval act featured Imelda Miller performing her previous year's winning song "Que alegre va María", and Pedro Vargas performing "El rey".

The winner was the song "Hoy canto por cantar", written by Ricardo Ceratto and Nydia Caro, and performed by Caro herself representing Puerto Rico; with "Yo soy", written and performed by Tanya Zea representing Guatemala, placing second; and "Vuelve", written by Pablo Schneider, and performed by José Luis Rodríguez representing Venezuela, placing third. There was a trophy for each of the first three places. The first prize trophy was delivered by Guillermo Cañedo, president of OTI; the second prize trophy by Luis Ezcurra and Eduardo Reina; and the third prize trophy by Fernando Eleta and Almeida Castro.

After the awards ceremony, the winning song was going to be reprised by Caro, but because of how emotionally shocked she was from winning, she was unable to finish singing and stopped to thank the audience for the support. This is the only time in the festival's history that a winning song was not reprised fully at the end of the show.

Winner

Results of the OTI Festival 1974
R/O	Country	Song	Artist	Votes	Place
1	Dominican Republic	"Alexandra"	Charytín Goyco	7	5
2	Spain	"Lapicero de madera"	Lia Uyá	9	4
3	Bolivia	"Los muros"	Jenny	2	14
4	Guatemala	"Yo soy"	Tanya Zea	14	2
5	Uruguay	"La montaña de la vida"	María Elisa	4	7
6	United States	"Pero...mi tierra"	Rosita Perú	1	15
7	Honduras	"Río viejo, viejo amigo"	Moisés Canelo	3	10
8	Netherlands Antilles	"Quédate"	Humberto Nivi	3	10
9	Panama	"La tierra es de todos"	Orlando Morales and Marcos Rodríguez	1	15
10	El Salvador	"Todo será de nosotros"	Félix López	3	10
11	Ecuador	"Las tres mariposas"	Hilda Murillo	7	5
12	Brazil	"Porque?"	Agnaldo Rayol	0	18
13	Mexico	"Quijote"	Enrique Cáceres	3	10
14	Chile	"Amor, volveré"	José Alfredo Fuentes	4	7
15	Nicaragua	"Gaviota"	Hernaldo Zúñiga	4	7
16	Puerto Rico	"Hoy canto por cantar"	Nydia Caro	18	1
17	Peru	"Mujer primera"	César Altamirano	0	18
18	Colombia	"Porque soy la mujer, esperé por ti"	Isadora	1	15
19	Venezuela	"Vuelve"	José Luis Rodríguez	11	3

=== Spokespersons ===
Each participating broadcaster (Note: Or group of broadcasters that jointly participated representing a country.) appointed a spokesperson who was responsible for announcing the votes for their respective jury in the order of participation via telephone. Known spokespersons at the 1974 festival are listed below.

- Mexico – Lupita Oláiz

== Detailed voting results ==
Each participating broadcaster assembled a national jury located in its respective country, composed of five members each. Each juror gave one vote to its favorite entry and could not vote for the entry representing its own country. Each participating broadcaster had also a delegate present in the hall to stand in for its jury if it was not receiving the event live, or in case of communication failure during the broadcast or voting. To ensure that there was no vote switching, before the voting segment began each participating broadcaster announced to its national audience the vote of its jury in local opt-out from its studios. In the event of a tie for first place, the stand-in delegates from the countries not affected by the tie would vote to select the winning song from among the tied ones.

All the countries gave their votes remotely by telephone, except for Bolivia, Brazil, the Dominican Republic, Ecuador, Guatemala, the Netherlands Antilles, Nicaragua, Panama, Puerto Rico, the United States, and Uruguay, which used the stand-in delegates. (Note: Mario Cuéllar voted for Bolivia, Adriano Rodríguez for the Dominican Republic, Jorge Pérez for Ecuador, Julio César del Valle for Guatemala, George Neuman for the Netherlands Antilles, Cecilia Sacasa for Nicaragua, Eduardo Frangias for Panama, Mario Prévidi for Puerto Rico, Gerardo Pallares for the United States, and Alberto Girondo for Uruguay.) The voting was supervised by OTI representative Amaury Daumas.

=== Voting process ===
Winner

Detailed voting results of the OTI Festival 1974
Voter: National jury Stand-in delegate		Voting countries																			Classification	
Voter: National jury Stand-in delegate		Dominican Republic	Spain	Bolivia	Guatemala	Uruguay	United States	Honduras	Netherlands Antilles	Panama	El Salvador	Ecuador	Brazil	Mexico	Chile	Nicaragua	Puerto Rico	Peru	Colombia	Venezuela	Votes	Place
Contestants	Dominican Republic			1	1	1			1						1		2				7	5
Contestants	Spain			1		1	1			1		1	2						1	1	9	4
Contestants	Bolivia		1																	1	2	14
Contestants	Guatemala	1	1	1			1	1	1		1					1		3	2	1	14	2
Contestants	Uruguay		1							1				1						1	4	7
Contestants	United States							1													1	15
Contestants	Honduras				1	1					1										3	10
Contestants	Netherlands Antilles	1			1												1				3	10
Contestants	Panama					1															1	15
Contestants	El Salvador				1							2									3	10
Contestants	Ecuador	1		1	1			1	1					1			1				7	5
Contestants	Brazil																				0	18
Contestants	Mexico					1	1			1											3	10
Contestants	Chile							1				1				2					4	7
Contestants	Nicaragua								1	1				1			1				4	7
Contestants	Puerto Rico	2					1			1	1	1		2	4	1		2	2	1	18	1
Contestants	Peru																				0	18
Contestants	Colombia							1													1	15
Contestants	Venezuela		2	1			1		1		2		3			1					11	3

== Broadcast ==
The festival was broadcast in the 19 participating countries, where the corresponding OTI member broadcasters relayed the contest through their networks after receiving it live via satellite.

Known details on the broadcasts of the festival in each country, including the specific broadcasting stations, commentators, and presenters of the local opt-out are shown in the tables below.

Broadcasters, commentators, and local presenters in participating countries
Country	Broadcaster	Channel(s)	Commentator(s)	Local presenter(s)	Ref.
Chile	TVN			Patricio Bañados	
Colombia	Inravisión (Note: Through the programadoras: Caracol Televisión, Producciones Nacionales Colombianas de Hoy (PUNCH), and Radio Televisión Interamericana (RTI).)	Primera Cadena			
Mexico	Televisa				
Netherlands Antilles	ATM	TeleCuraçao			
Spain	TVE	TVE 1	José Luis Uribarri	Joaquín Díaz Palacios	

Broadcasters and commentators in non-participating countries
Country	Broadcaster	Channel(s)	Commentator(s)	Ref.
Costa Rica	Telecentro	Telecentro Canal 6		
Costa Rica	Teletica	Canal 7		

== Reception ==
The festival maintained the viewing figures of the previous year with 200 million potential viewers and Mexico was, again, thanks to its national final, the country where the number of viewers was higher, to the point that Acapulco, the host city, and the whole country was at a standstill due to the enormous interest shown by the public.

The victory of Puerto Rico in the festival was completely unexpected and controversial. The lyrics of the song were against the popular protest songs that filled the Latin American airwaves. That song criticized the protest songs for being repetitive and for not offering real solutions to the problems that many Latin Americans had to suffer every day.

Nydia Caro, after her victory, was given a hero's welcome upon her arrival to San Juan and was received by a huge crowd of people at the airport. Regardless of the controversial message of her song, her entry became an enormous hit in all of Latin America and launched the international career of the singer. Because of the growing success, she became an ambassador of her country, making her successful show, and appearing on television shows around the world.

The song of the third-placed singer, "Vuelve" by José Luis Rodríguez, also became a hit both in Latin America and Spain. Not only did participating in the festival contribute to his success, but he later on would become both a jury member and special guest singer for the OTI Festival. Since then, his career experienced a rise to the point that he became and still is to this day one of the biggest names in the Latin music industry, still singing even as he's entering his 80's.
