= Mirla Castellanos =

Venezuelan singer

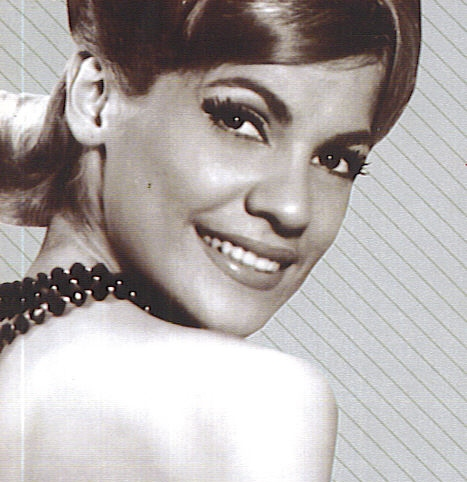

Background information
- Born: Mirla Josefina Castellanos Peñaloza; 31 March 1941 (age 85); Valencia, Venezuela
- Occupation: Singer

Mirla Josefina Castellanos Peñaloza is a Venezuelan singer with a career spanning over 40 years. Often referred to as "La Primerísima", she started her career as a singer with the band "Cuarteto Los Naipes" in the 1960s before pursuing a solo career. She has sold more than 13 million records worldwide.

== Biography ==
Moving to Europe in the late 1960s, she recorded music by composers such as Domenico Modugno, with whom she later performed a duet of the song "Meraviglioso" during the preliminary of the 1968 Festival San Remo; but the song did not make the cut for the finals due to documented theories about the inconvenience of the topic exposed in the song, after Luigi Tenco suicide at San Remo festival the previous year. In 1969, Castellanos won the Benidorm Song Festival with a composition by Manuel Alejandro. After returning to South America in 1970, she took second place in the Latin American Song Festival. In 1972 she represented her country in the first edition of the OTI Festival which was held in Madrid, in which she won fourth place. Three years later she was again internally selected by Venevision to represent Venezuela in the fourth edition of the OTI Festival which was held in San Juan, Puerto Rico. Surprisingly, her entry was acclaimed and managed to get the third place, improving the place she got back in 1972 in Madrid.

With the support of shows such as Sábado Sensacional and her own live show "Primerísima," Castellanos furthered her reputation in the 1970s and 1980s, making her first appearance in New York at the Chateau Madrid in 1976.

With the album entitled "Vuelve Pronto", she became the first Venezuelan singer to gain Billboard recognition in 1983, before going on to release "Venezuela", recorded along with the Venezuelan Symphonic Orchestra. Mirla Castellanos's album "Como Nunca" has been described as a compilation of her greatest hits. Amongst many successful songs there are lots of emblematic songs for Castellanos, one being a version of a song composed by Alberto Cortez: "El Abuelo".

Castellanos has taken part multiple times in musical presentations for the annual contest Miss Venezuela, produced by Joaquín Riviera. The use of expensive costumes and sparkling choreographies were aspects well managed by Mirla during the "golden years" of Venezuelan television. At the time, and still, she was realized as an authentic "Diva & Primadonna" in the Venezuelan musical scene.

Currently, Mirla Castellanos has been described as a respected singer. She has won many awards and international recognition in the Spanish speaking countries and markets, especially for "Balada romántica" (romantic and popular Hispanic music).
