= Canal 8 (Honduran TV channel) =

Honduran public television channel

- Country: Honduras

Programming
- Picture format: HDTV 1080i

Ownership
- Owner: Government of Honduras

History
- Launched: 20 August 2008; 17 years ago

Links
- Website: tnh.gob.hn

Canal 8 formerly known as Televisión Nacional de Honduras (Spanish for: National Television of Honduras) or TNH is a state-owned television network based in Tegucigalpa, Honduras. The channel is the first state-owned television channel and is operated by the Ministry of Culture and Telecommunications. Canal 8 went on the air on August 20, 2008; shortly after its launch, it was temporarily taken off the air under the grounds that the license was considered illegal by Conatel.

In 2017, JICA donated 742 NHK programs to the channel.
