= Camilo Sesto =

Spanish singer (1946–2019)

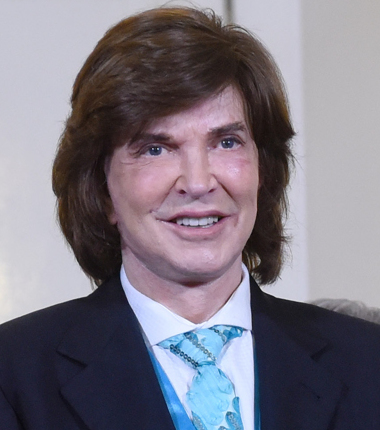
- Camilo Sesto in 2017

Background information
- Born: Camilo Blanes Cortés; 16 September 1946; Alcoi, Spain
- Died: 8 September 2019 (aged 72) Madrid, Spain
- Genres: Melodic song; latin pop; rock
- Occupations: Singer, songwriter, producer
- Instruments: Vocals, guitar, drums
- Years active: 1964–2019
- Labels: Movieplay; Ariola; BMG; Elica Records; Universal; Sony Music
- Website: camilosestooficial.com

Camilo Blanes Cortés (16 September 1946 – 8 September 2019), known professionally as Camilo Sesto, was a Spanish singer, songwriter and producer.

His career achieved international recognition in the 1970s and 1980s. He was one of the leading voices in Spanish-language music. It is estimated that he sold more 100 millions of copies throughout his career.

== Biographical summary ==
Sesto sang in two pop bands during the 1960s and won a contest in a Madrid television show. He played a part in the Spanish filming of Hamelín. Later, he teamed up with singer and producer Juan Pardo, but success would come on its own accord, with his own music works. From the 1970s to 2000s Sesto created many hit songs, with almost everyone coming from his own inspiration, being the author, performer, composer, and producer of all his works. Camilo Sesto acted on several occasions at Madison Square Garden, also performed at major venues in the Americas, Europe, and Asia.

Most of Sesto's works are in Spanish, but he also recorded songs in English, Valencian, Italian, German, Japanese and Portuguese. Camilo released at least one album in English.

As a composer, Sesto wrote songs for artists such as Ángela Carrasco, Miguel Bosé, Lucía Méndez, Lani Hall, Charytín Goyco and José José, among others. He also produced and translated to Spanish the lyrics of an album by the popular Australian rock band Air Supply. Throughout his career, he remained one of the most influential pioneer artists of pop and rock in Spanish, that would inspire many newer acts in the Latin music world as well as across in the Americas, Europe, and Asia.

== Career ==
The mid-sixties marked the beginning of Sesto's career. After producing his first record with his band Los Dayson, in 1965 they traveled to Madrid to appear on Televisión Española's Salto a la Fama. In 1966, Sesto joined another band, Los Botines, whose music was influenced by The Beatles. In 1967, the band appeared in the film Los chicos del Preu. At the beginning (1969) he participated in the chorus of the song "O Tren" by Andrés do Barro, produced by Juan Pardo. In 1970, he recorded various singles including: "Llegará el Verano" and "Sin Dirección", with the artistic name "Camilo Sexto". He became his own producer, as well as the producer of other artists. His solo career started in 1970, the same year he won the "Revelación" price, at the "Olés de la Canción" festival.

After meeting producer, Juan Pardo in 1972, he launched a solo career under the stage name Camilo Sesto. He appeared on Spanish TV's program "Buenas Noches" singing "Algo de Mí" (his first No.1 record). Algo de Mi reached the Number 1 slot in Spain and most of the Spanish speaking world, and it maintained that top position for a whole year in most of Latin-America. In 1973, he represented Spain with the song "Algo Más" in the second edition of the OTI Festival, which was held in the Brazilian city of Belo Horizonte. In 1974, he participated in the 15th edition of the Viña del Mar International Song Festival in Chile. His success as a pop singer continued with record sales escalating rapidly. His concerts took him around the world with such songs as "¿Quieres ser mi amante?", "Llueve sobre mojado", "Isabel" and "Ayudadme". In 1975, "Jamás" and "Melina".(a song about Melina Mercouri),

On 6 November 1975, Sesto starred in the role of Jesus on the Spanish version/adaptation by Jaime Azpilicueta of the rock opera Jesus Christ Superstar at the Alcalá-Palace Theatre in Madrid (Spain). The production was very costly as he financed it entirely. His work was a success and received positive reviews. The public filled the theatre and shows were extended to four months. Both in terms of interpretation and musically speaking, Sesto's show was considered of great quality by Andrew Lloyd Webber.

After successfully starring in the Spanish version of "Jesus Christ Superstar" catapulted him to superstardom, Sesto continued gaining fame as a singer and composer. Notable hits from Sesto include "Sólo tú", "Si tú te vas", "Con el viento a tu favor", "Miénteme", "El amor de mi vida", "Vivir así es morir de amor", "Si me dejas ahora", "La culpa ha sido mía", "Perdóname", "Dónde estés, con quién estés", "Amor, no me ignores", "Qué más te da", "Devuélveme mi libertad", "Mi mundo, tú", "Amor de mujer", "Ven o voy" and "Me lo estás poniendo difícil".

Nomination 26th Annual Grammy Awards (1984): Nominated for Best Latin Pop Album Lani Hall. This recognition was linked to Camilo Sesto, who composed and produced the album and also performed a duet Corazón Encadenado.

In 1984, he recorded the duet single "Mi Amor" with American actress and singer Audrey Landers (known for the TV series Dallas) for her album Wo der Südwind weht, launching a European tour and entering several hit charts in Germany, Belgium, Scandinavia, and the Netherlands. Various editions and formats were released and distributed across the Americas, Europe, and Africa. In 1985, he toured Japan and performed 7 concerts for over 40,000 spectators in Tokyo, Osaka, Nagoya, and Fukuoka.

Sesto went through a retirement in 1987 until he returned to the music scene in 1991. That year, he released A Voluntad del Cielo (Heaven Willing). The album's lead single, "Amor Mío, ¿Qué Me Has Hecho?" (My love, what have you done to me?), reached number one on the Billboard Hot Latin Songs chart in the United States. The track was nominated for Pop Song of the Year at the Lo Nuestro Awards of 1992 and the American Society of Composers, Authors and Publishers Latin Awards of 1993, respectively.

He survived a liver transplant in August 2001 and released an album, Alma, two years later. Sesto returned to the stage in 2004 at the Viña del Mar International Song Festival in Chile and won many awards. In 2005, Camilo Sesto performed at the festival organized by Radio Tele-Taxi in Can Zam (Santa Coloma de Gramenet, Barcelona). 500,000 people attended the event.

In 2008, Camilo announced his retirement from the studio, and in September 2009 he announced that he would go on a farewell tour. He would tour the Americas (United States, Mexico, Peru, Chile, Ecuador, Colombia, and other countries) for the next two years. In October 2010, he gave his last two concerts in Madrid, which were released as his first "live" (and also last) album. A live DVD called "Todo de Mí" recorded in Madrid, was released around the same time.

== Controversies ==
In 2011, there were rumours of another Sesto "farewell tour", that some news media called "La Gira del Adiós" ("The Farewell Tour"). Allegedly, tour dates were made, radio stations spoke about it, tickets were sold, etc. There were many convincing ads in local newspapers, and magazines. However, Sesto later communicated that this was nothing but a "hoax" to get people to buy fake tickets for a tour that he himself was not even aware of. Many radio stations and music media threatened to take legal action against the singer if he would not "meet with the responsibility", and Sesto was forced to once again come back into the media to try to clear his name. The courts ruled in favour of some institutions that eventually did sue.

== Death ==
Sesto died on 8 September 2019 at a Madrid hospital from kidney failure, eight days shy of his 73rd birthday. He was due to release a new album on 13 September, as well as embark in a tour in the United States the following month. Spain's acting Prime Minister Pedro Sánchez wrote on Twitter: "Spain and all of Latin America mourn the loss of Camilo Sesto. His melodies will always be part of our memory."

== Awards and honors ==
- Revelation Award (1971): Received at the Festival de los Olés de la Canción.
- A.C.E. Awards New York (1972): Most Outstanding Male Singer.
- A.C.E. Awards New York (1974): Lucía Bosé and Camilo Blanes: Songwriters of the Year / Amor, Amar.
- Nomination 18th Annual Grammy (1976): Nominated in the category of Grammy Award for Best Latin Recording for ¿Quieres Ser Mi Amante?.
- A.C.E. Awards New York (1979): Best Album of the Year / Entre Amigos.
- Platinum Record (1979): He was the first Spanish artist to receive it for selling 13 million copies.
- Viña del Mar International Song Festival (1981): He was the first artist to receive the Silver Seagull by popular acclaim at the event.
- A.C.E. Awards New York (1981): Latin American Superstars: Best Show / Madison Square Garden.
- A.C.E. Awards New York (1984): Best Show and Best International Artist of the Year / Radio City Music Hall.
- Camilo Sesto Day (1985): February 21 was officially proclaimed in Puerto Rico by Governor Rafael Hernández Colón.
- Lo Nuestro Awards (1992): Amor Mío, ¿Qué Me Has Hecho? was nominated for Lo Nuestro Award for Pop Song of the Year.
- Destino Awards (1997): He Named Ambassador of Latin American Tourism.
- Golden Hearts (2001): Best Male Artist. Gala 50th Anniversary of Diez Minutos magazine.
- Viña del Mar International Song Festival (2004): He returned to the festival and received the Festival Medal, Silver Torch, Gold Torch, and again the Gaviota de Plata.
- 50 Diamond Records (2004): Recognition awarded by BMG for 50 million records sold.
- RTT Festival Cam Zam (2005): Recognition for your participation.
- Cultural Ambassador (2007): He Named Ambassador of the Alto Guadalquivir region for his work in culture and sports.
- Maximum Hispanic Pride (2011): Awarded in Las Vegas, U.S., for his 50-year career.
- Camilo Sesto Day (28 May): An official day proclaimed by the state of Nevada, U.S..
- Mr. Gay Pride Spain (2011): On 1 July, during the Madrid Pride celebrations, Camilo Sesto received the Mr. Gay Pride award in Plaza de Callao, in recognition of his musical career.
- Charlotte Excellence Award (2014): Awarded in North Carolina, U.S., for his artistic career.
- Favorite Son and Gold Medal (2016): Highest honors granted by his hometown, Alcoy, in recognition of his entire international career.
- Sony Music Spain Honorary Recognition (2016): For his 70th birthday and for surpassing 100 million records sold.
- Latin Songwriters Hall of Fame (2017): Official induction in recognition of his prolific career as an author (La Musa Awards).
- International Gold Excellence Award (2018): Peruvian American National Council, Washington D.C.
- Alameda Camilo Sesto (2018): The main artery of his hometown was renamed in his honor (formerly Alameda de Alcoy).
- Honorary Member of the Círculo Industrial de Alcoy (2018): Tribute to Camilo Sesto on the 150th anniversary of the institution.
- Latino de Oro (2019): Granted by the Foundation City World at the Latino Awards, in recognition of his impact on Ibero-American culture (posthumous).
- Gold Medal of Merit in the Fine Arts (2019): Granted from the Spanish government as a essential figure in the national arts (posthumous).
- Cultural Ambassador (2019): He is Posthumously named Ambassador of the Valencian Community.
- Ondas Award (2019): For his artistic career, granted posthumously.
- Adoptive Son of Torrelodones (2019): Granted posthumously; he lived there for more than 30 years.
- Camilo Sesto Park (2020): Unanimously approved to rename the "Casa Rosa" park in Torrelodones in honor of Camilo Sesto, including a commemorative plaque (posthumous).
- Statue in his hometown (2025): A 1.90m bronze statue was inaugurated at the Camilo Sesto Museum in Alcoy.

== Camilo Sesto Museum ==
On June 11, 2026, a museum dedicated to his personal and professional life inaugurated in Alcoy, Spain. The space is divided into two floors of 300 square meters and houses 2,000 objects, highlighting a collection of gold and platinum records, certificates, awards, diplomas, and photographs.

== Discography ==
=== Groups ===
- 1964: Los Dayson
- 1966: Los Botines

=== Studio Albums ===
- 1970: Llegará el Verano / Sin Dirección
- 1971: Algo de Mí
- 1972: Sólo un Hombre
- 1973: Algo Más
- 1974: Camilo
- 1975: Amor Libre
- 1975: Jesucristo Superstar
- 1976: Memorias
- 1976: Look in the Eye
- 1977: Rasgos
- 1977: Entre Amigos
- 1978: Sentimientos
- 1979: Horas de Amor
- 1980: Amaneciendo
- 1981: Más y Más
- 1982: Camilo (In English)
- 1983: Con Ganas
- 1984: Amanecer/84
- 1985: Tuyo
- 1986: Agenda De Baile
- 1991: A Voluntad del Cielo
- 1992: Huracán de Amor
- 1994: Amor sin Vértigo
- 2003: Alma
- 2018: Camilo Sinfónico

=== Live ===
- 2010: Todo de Mí (Live on October 1 and 2 in Madrid)
- 2025: Camilo Love Sound Typhoon (Osaka '85 In concert)

=== Compilations ===
- 1982: Muy Personal (Mis 20 Grandes Exitos)
- 1988: Amor Libre: 12 Grandes Exitos
- 1997: Camilo Superstar
- 2004: Camilo Sesto Nº 1
- 2013: Esencial Camilo Sesto
- 2016: Camilo 70
- 2022: Camilo Forever

== Duets ==
Artist		Song
Raquel Ramírez		"Por amor"
Ángela Carrasco		"Callados" / "Corazones de fuego"
Rocío Dúrcal		"Amanecí en tus brazos" / "Volver, volver" / "Ella" / "Perdóname"
Judy Collins		"Shoulder to Shoulder"
Lani Hall		"Corazón encadenado" / "Si tú fueras capaz"
Audrey Landers		"Mi amor"
Charytín		"Ni tú, ni yo"
Lisa Ball		"You Don't Bring Me Flowers" / "Amor brujo"
Scarlata		"No digas no"
Camilo Michael Blanes		"Sentimiento de amor"
Alaska		"El amor de mi vida" / "Vivir así es morir de amor"
Isabel Patton	Andrea Bronston	"The Phantom of the Opera" / "All I Ask of You" / "The Point of no Return"
Marina Zapata		"Callados" (Live)
Pope Francis		"Padre nuestro"
Marta Sánchez	Pandora	"Perdóname"
Ruth Lorenzo	Natalia Jiménez	"Amor... amar"
Pastora Soler	Yuri	"Quererte a ti"
Carlos Rivera		"Algo de mí"

Preceded by Marisol with "Niña"	Spain in the OTI Festival; 1973	Succeeded by Lia Uyá with "Lapicero de madera"
