= Luisito Rey =

Spanish musician and executive

- Born: Luis Gallego Sánchez; 28 June 1945; Cádiz, Andalusia, Spain
- Died: 9 December 1992 (aged 47); Barcelona, Catalonia, Spain
- Other name: Luisito Gasán
- Occupations: Singer; songwriter; manager
- Years active: 1954–1990
- Spouse: Marcela Basteri
- Children: 3, including Luis Miguel
- Musical career
- Genres: Ballad; flamenco

Luis Gallego Sánchez (28 June 1945 – 9 December 1992), known as Luisito Rey, was a Spanish singer-songwriter and music executive. He is best known as the father and first manager of Mexican singer Luis Miguel.

== Life and career ==
Luisito Rey was the son of Rafael Gallego Rey, a flamenco singer turned electrician, and Matilde Sánchez Repiso, a singer and dancer. His siblings are Vicente, nicknamed Tito, and Mario. Mario Vicente Gallego was born in 1942, has 4 children, and was married to Rosa Barbarito before he died. From an early age he had a penchant for singing, composing, and playing the guitar. His natural talent helped him to get out of Spain and travel through many countries, including Argentina, where he met his life companion, Italian model Marcela Basteri.

His artistic name was originally Luisito Gasán (combining the first syllables of his father's and mother's last name). He later settled for Luisito Rey, Luisito being the diminutive of Luis and Rey being his father's maternal surname.

A bullfighter fan, his favorite toreador was Luis Miguel González Lucas, better known as Luis Miguel Dominguín, father of famous singer Miguel Bosé. In his honor, he named his firstborn son Luis Miguel Gallego.

His first taste of success was with the song "Frente a una copa de vino" (In front of a glass of wine), a ballad classic that became his biggest and only major hit in Latin America. Other hit songs include La Gran Ciudad (The Great City) and El Loco (The Crazy Man).

== Personal life ==
Luisito Rey's reputation as a solid artist and able manager was greatly tarnished by the revelations of many of his acquaintances. Some, like Luis Miguel's godfather, renowned Puerto Rican psychologist Alfred D. Herger, have described him as a psychopath and abuser. Years earlier, Rey's brother Vicente stated that Rey would sometimes prostitute Luis Miguel's mother Marcela Basteri for drug binges. Dominican-born Mexican actor and family friend Andrés García revealed that Rey had taken advantage of him by asking to stay in an apartment which García was paying for a female friend. Despite constant promises, Rey never reimbursed any of the rent to García. Keeping with custom, Luis Miguel has said nothing publicly about his relationship with his father.

Rey once stated that Pablo Picasso painted a small sketch of him, used in one of his greatest hits albums, and that singer Frank Sinatra was interested in recording La Gran Ciudad. None of these events were actually true.
