= TV Itacolomi =

TV Itacolomi (ZYA 721)
Belo Horizonte, Minas Gerais; Brazil
- Channels: Analog: 4 (VHF)

Programming
- Affiliations: Rede Tupi

Ownership
- Owner: Diários Associados

History
- First air date: November 8, 1955
- Last air date: July 18, 1980
- Former call signs: PRB-3 TV (1955-1973)

Technical information
- Licensing authority: DENTEL

TV Itacolomi was a commercial television station licensed to Belo Horizonte, the capital of the state of Minas Gerais, and owned by Diários Associados. Throughout its entire operation, the station was a Rede Tupi affiliate.

It was the third station to be set up by Assis Chateaubriand to sign on, the seventh in Brazil overall and the first outside of the Rio-São Paulo axis.

== History ==
Rádio Guarani, a station owned by the conglomerate, gained a television license in 1951. The station, whose tentative name was TV Rádio Guarani, changed its name to TV Itacolomi in reference to the Itacolomi Peak. The station was the first in Brazil to be built entirely by Brazilians.

On launch night at 7:30pm, announcer Bernardo Grimberg, in a triumphal entry, announced its opening over an RCA Victor logo on a sheet of paper. This was followed by a blessing by the metropolitan archbishop of Belo Horizonte, D. Antônio dos Santos Cabral. Speeches were then made by Assis Chateaubriand, superintendent Victor Purri, director of Diários Associados in the state, Newton Paiva Ferreira and president Juscelino Kubitschek.

The launch ceremonies continued for a week, which enabled the channel to go regular. Most of the line-up was produced locally, and also included some networked output produced by the stations in Rio and São Paulo.

The station was responsible for the production of the OTI Festival 1973, on behalf of Rede Tupi, which was historical for Brazil as it was one of the first times a transmission of color was made for many regions.

TV Itacolomi shut down on July 18, 1980, along with six other Tupi stations. Authorities took the station off the air at 10:27am when the channel had not started its broadcasts. At closing time, there was no decision over the status of the 300 retrenched employees.

=== Legacy ===
An exhibit was held at the Federal University of Minas Gerais from December 11, 2018, to December 2019.
