= OTI Festival 1973 =

2nd OTI Song Festival

Date and venue
- Final: 10 November 1973
- Venue: Palácio das Artes; Belo Horizonte, Brazil

Organization
- Organizer: Organização da Televisão Ibero-americana (OTI)
- Supervisor: Amaury Daumas
- Host broadcaster: TV Itacolomi–Rede Tupi
- Musical director: Ivan Paulo
- Presenters: Walter Forster; Íris Lettieri

Participants
- Number of entries: 14
- Debuting countries: Mexico
- Participation map: Participating countries

Vote
- Voting system: Each country had 5 jurors and each of them voted for their favourite entry.
- Winning song: Mexico "Qué alegre va María"

The OTI Festival 1973 (Portuguese: Segundo Grande Prêmio da Canção Ibero-Americana, Spanish: Segundo Gran Premio de la Canción Iberoamericana) was the second edition of the OTI Festival, held on 10 November 1973 at the Palácio das Artes in Belo Horizonte, Brazil, and presented by Walter Forster and Íris Lettieri. It was organised by the Organização da Televisão Ibero-americana (OTI) and host broadcaster TV Itacolomi on behalf of Rede Tupi, who staged the event after winning the 1972 festival for Brazil with the song "Diálogo" by Claudia Regina and Tobías.

Broadcasters from fourteen countries took part, with Mexico competing for the first time and joining the original thirteen participating countries from the previous contest. Ecuador, who was also going to join for the first time, made a late withdrawal. The winner was the song "Qué alegre va María", written by Celia Bonfil, and performed by Imelda Miller representing Mexico. A tie for the first place occurred at the end of the jury voting, with the entry from Mexico tying on points with "El mundo gira por tu amor", written by Jaime Delgado Aparicio and Mario Cavagnaro, and performed by Gabriela de Jesús representing Peru, and winning after applying the tiebreaker procedure.

== Location ==
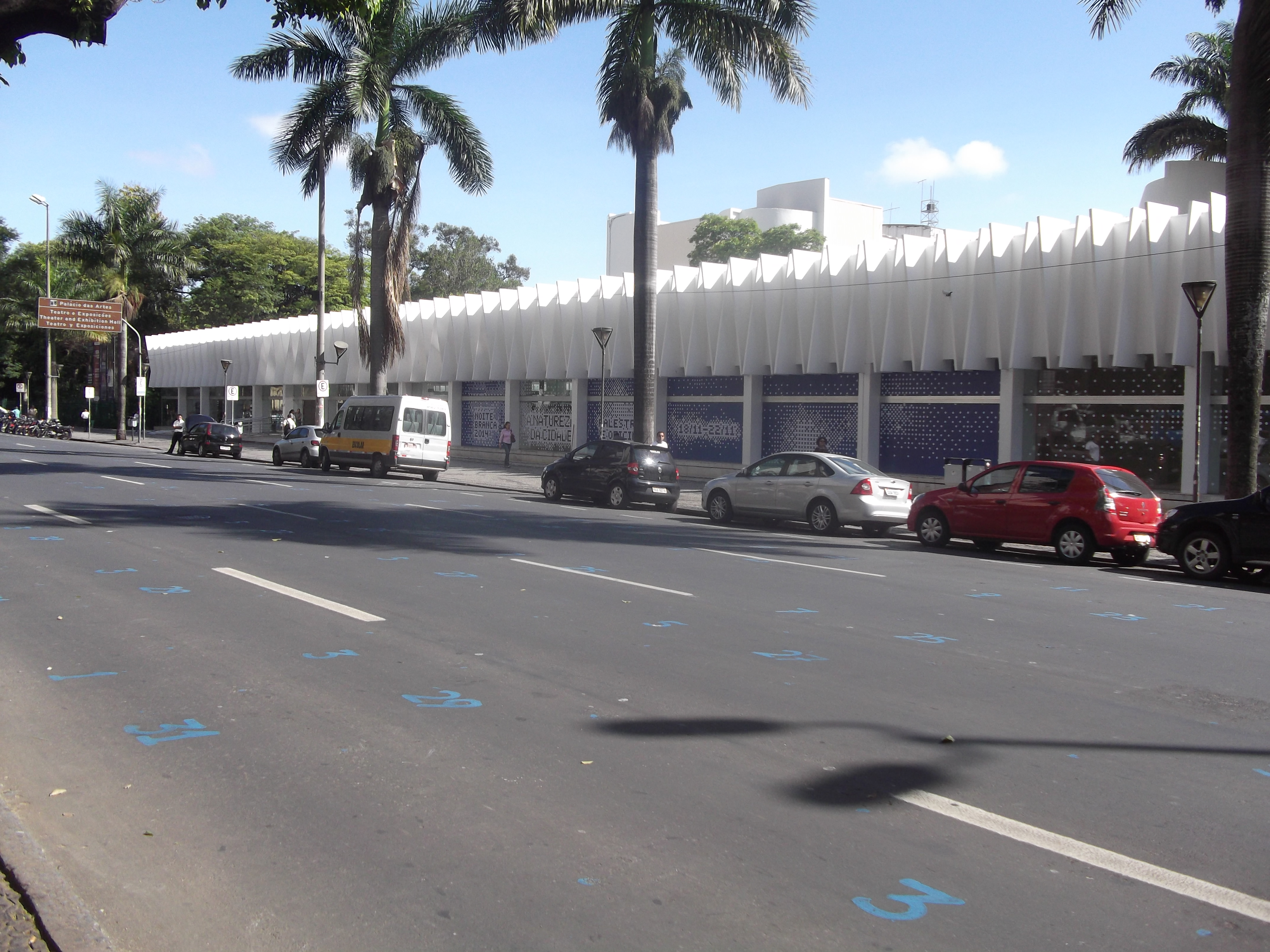
Palácio das Artes, Belo Horizonte – host venue of the OTI Festival 1973.

According to the rules of the OTI Festival at the time, the winning broadcaster of the previous edition would host the festival the following year. The Organização da Televisão Ibero-americana (OTI) designated Rede Tupi, which was the winning broadcaster of the first edition with the song "Diálogo" performed by Claudia Regina and Tobías representing Brazil, as the host broadcaster of the second edition.

The Rede Tupi hosting committee decided that Belo Horizonte was the most suitable city to host the OTI Festival. This decision was made because of the city's good infrastructure and its readiness for exposition and exhibition purposes. The venue of the festival was the Palácio das Artes, a modern and vanguardist auditorium which was designed by Oscar Niemeyer and was inaugurated in 1971, two years before the festival took place. The palace, which was one of the biggest concert halls in Brazil and Latin America, had a seating capacity for over 2,000 people, which makes it bigger than the venue of the previous edition in Madrid. Rede Tupi delegated the production of the festival to its local affiliate TV Itacolomi, which staged the event as part of its 18th anniversary celebrations.

== Participants ==
Broadcasters from fourteen countries participated in this edition of the OTI Festival. The OTI members, public or private broadcasters from Spain, Portugal, and twelve Spanish and Portuguese speaking countries of Ibero-America signed up for the festival. Televisa, which represented Mexico, made its debut at the festival selecting its entry through its 2nd National OTI Festival. (Note: Telesistema Mexicano (TSM) had signed up for the 1971 festival and had selected its entry through its 1st National OTI Festival, but the entry was disqualified by the OTI Program Commission, and it refused to send a replacement.) The winner of this national festival was "La canción del hombre", written by Felipe Gil and performed by Gualberto Castro, but since it was later proven that it had been broadcast on the radio before the permitted date, it became ineligible and the runner-up was sent instead. The broadcasters from other countries, such as Brazil and Colombia, also used national televised competitions to select their entries for the festival. Ecuador, which was also going to participate for the first time, made a late withdrawal.

One performing artist had previously represented the same country in the previous edition: Arturo Quesada had represented Bolivia in 1972. The festival featured two international well-known artists, Camilo Sesto representing Spain, and Sergio Esquivel, who was the lyricist of the Mexican entry.

Participants of the OTI Festival 1973
| Country | Broadcaster(s) | Song | Artist | Songwriter(s) | Language | Conductor |
|---|---|---|---|---|---|---|
| Argentina | Televisión Argentina | "Dije que te quiero" | Juan Eduardo | Juan Eduardo; Elo Santos | Spanish | Horacio Malvicino |
| Bolivia | TVB | "No sé vivir sin ti" | Arturo Quesada | Jesús González; Pedro Sanantonio | Spanish | Ivan Paulo |
| Brazil | Rede Tupi | "Baianeiro" | Nadinho da Ilha | Armando Aguilar | Portuguese | Ivan Paulo |
| Chile | TVN | "Cuando tú vuelvas" | Antonio Zabaleta | Antonio Zabaleta | Spanish | Horacio Saavedra |
| Colombia | Caracol Televisión; PUNCH; RTI | "Una orquídea, un amor" | Claudia Osuna | Alfonso de la Espriella | Spanish | Jimmy Salcedo |
| Dominican Republic | | "El juicio final" | Niní Cáffaro | Rafael Solano | Spanish | Jorge Taveras |
| Mexico | Televisa | "Qué alegre va María" | Imelda Miller | Celia Bonfil | Spanish | Chucho Ferrer |
| Panama | RPC-TV | "Soy feliz" | Orlando Morales | Mary Jean Wright | Spanish | Ivan Paulo |
| Peru | Emisoras Nacionales | "El mundo gira por tu amor" | Gabriela de Jesús | Jaime Delgado Aparicio; Mario Cavagnaro | Spanish | Ivan Paulo |
| Portugal | RTP | "Poema de mim" | Paco Bandeira | Paco Bandeira | Portuguese | Ivan Paulo |
| Puerto Rico | WKAQ-Telemundo | "Yo quiero una orquesta" | Oscar Solo | Oscar Solo | Spanish | Pedro Rivera Toledo |
| Spain | TVE | "Algo más" | Camilo Sesto | Camilo Sesto | Spanish | Juan Carlos Calderón |
| Uruguay | Sociedad Televisora Larrañaga | "El universo es un corazón" | Aldo | Aldo | Spanish | Ivan Paulo |
| Venezuela | | "Poema para el olvido" | Mayra Martí | Eduardo Cabrera; María de Lourdes Devonish | Spanish | Eduardo Cabrera |

== Festival overview ==
The festival was held on Saturday 10 November 1973, beginning at 20:00 BRT (23:00 UTC). It was presented by Walter Forster and Íris Lettieri. This was the first time that the festival was hosted in a Portuguese-speaking country, so the festival was mainly presented in Portuguese for the first time. The musical director was Ivan Paulo who conducted the 30-piece Rede Tupi Symphonic Orchestra when required. The draw to determine the running order (R/O) was held a few days before the festival. The interval act consisted in a performance by Antônio Carlos e Jocáfi.

The winner was the song "Qué alegre va María", written by Celia Bonfil, and performed by Imelda Miller representing Mexico. Its performer received a trophy, while its songwriter received two, one for composer and another for lyricist. The trophies were delivered by Guillermo Cañedo, president of OTI; Edmundo Reina, president of the OTI programs committee; and José de Almeida Castro, president of the Ibero-American Broadcasting Association. The festival ended with a reprise of the winning entry.

Winner

Results of the OTI Festival 1973
| R/O | Country | Song | Artist | Votes | Place |
|---|---|---|---|---|---|
| 1 | Panama | "Soy feliz" | Orlando Morales | 2 | 12 |
| 2 | Uruguay | "El mundo es un corazón" | Aldo | 4 | 8 |
| 3 | Spain | "Algo más" | Camilo Sesto | 6 | 5 |
| 4 | Argentina | "Dije que te quiero" | Juan Eduardo | 3 | 9 |
| 5 | Bolivia | "No sé vivir sin ti" | Arturo Quesada | 1 | 14 |
| 6 | Colombia | "Una orquídea, un amor" | Claudia Osuna | 3 | 9 |
| 7 | Peru | "El mundo gira por tu amor" | Gabriela de Jesús | 10 | 2 |
| 8 | Venezuela | "Poema para el olvido" | Mayra Martí | 3 | 9 |
| 9 | Brazil | "Baianero" | Nadinho da Ilha | 7 | 4 |
| 10 | Puerto Rico | "Yo quiero una orquesta" | Oscar Solo | 5 | 6 |
| 11 | Chile | "Cuando tú vuelvas" | Antonio Zabaleta | 5 | 6 |
| 12 | Dominican Republic | "El juicio final" | Niní Cáffaro | 9 | 3 |
| 13 | Mexico | "Qué alegre va María" | Imelda Miller | 10 | 1 |
| 14 | Portugal | "Poema de mim" | Paco Bandeira | 2 | 12 |

== Detailed voting results ==
The voting system was the same one that was implemented the previous year. Each participating broadcaster assembled a national jury located in its respective country, composed of five members each. Each juror gave one vote to its favorite entry and could not vote for the entry representing its own country. Each participating broadcaster had also a delegate present in the hall to stand in for its jury if it was not receiving the event live, or in case of communication failure during the broadcast or voting. For the first time, to ensure that there was no vote switching, before the voting segment began each participating broadcaster announced to its national audience the vote of its jury in local opt-out from its studios. All the countries gave their votes remotely by telephone, except for Bolivia, the Dominican Republic, Puerto Rico, and Venezuela, which used the stand-in delegates. (Note: Bolivia and the Dominican Republic, due to not receiving the event live, since they neither had a satellite ground station nor were within reach of one; Venezuela due to a loss of sound during the broadcast, which the broadcaster's technicians filled with background music to make up for the lack of the original audio, which prevented the jury and viewers from hearing several entries, including their own; and Puerto Rico for unknown reasons.) The voting was supervised by OTI representative Amaury Daumas.

=== Voting process ===
Tie for first place
Winner

Detailed voting results of the OTI Festival 1973
| Voter: National jury Stand-in delegate | | Voting countries | | | | | | | | | | | | | | Classification | |
| Voter: National jury Stand-in delegate | | Panama | Uruguay | Spain | Argentina | Bolivia | Colombia | Peru | Venezuela | Brazil | Puerto Rico | Chile | Dominican Republic | Mexico | Portugal | Votes | Place |
| Contestants | Panama | | | | | | | 1 | | | | | | 1 | | 2 | 12 |
| Contestants | Uruguay | | | | | | | 2 | | | | 1 | | 1 | | 4 | 8 |
| Contestants | Spain | 1 | | | 2 | | | | | 1 | 1 | 1 | | | | 6 | 5 |
| Contestants | Argentina | 1 | | | | | 1 | 1 | | | | | | | | 3 | 9 |
| Contestants | Bolivia | | | | | | | | | | | | 1 | | | 1 | 14 |
| Contestants | Colombia | | | | | 3 | | | | | | | | | | 3 | 9 |
| Contestants | Peru | | 2 | 2 | | | | | | 1 | | 1 | | 1 | 3 | 10 | TIE |
| Contestants | Venezuela | | | 2 | | | | | | | | | 1 | | | 3 | 9 |
| Contestants | Brazil | 1 | | | | | | 1 | | | 1 | 2 | | | 2 | 7 | 4 |
| Contestants | Puerto Rico | 1 | 1 | | | 1 | | | | | | | 2 | | | 5 | 6 |
| Contestants | Chile | | 1 | | | | 4 | | | | | | | | | 5 | 6 |
| Contestants | Dominican Republic | 1 | | | | 1 | | | 4 | | 2 | | | 1 | | 9 | 3 |
| Contestants | Mexico | | 1 | 1 | 3 | | | | 1 | 2 | 1 | | 1 | | | 10 | TIE |
| Contestants | Portugal | | | | | | | | | 1 | | | | 1 | | 2 | 12 |

The voting process ended with a tie between the Peruvian and Mexican entries, both with ten votes. According to the rules, in the event of a tie for first place, the stand-in delegates from the countries not affected by the tie would vote to select the winning song from among the tied ones. So the delegates of the other twelve countries present in the hall voted for their favorite song between those two. Only the country of origin of some of the votes was revealed during the recount.

Detailed voting results of the OTI Festival 1973 – tiebreak
| | Votes | | | | | | | | | | | | Classification | |
| | 1st delegate | 2nd delegate | Panama | Bolivia | 5th delegate | Spain | Argentina | 8th delegate | 9th delegate | 10th delegate | 11th delegate | 12th delegate | Votes | Place |
|---|---|---|---|---|---|---|---|---|---|---|---|---|---|---|
| Peru | | 1 | 1 | | 1 | | | | 1 | 1 | | | 5 | 2 |
| Mexico | 1 | | | 1 | | 1 | 1 | 1 | | | 1 | 1 | 7 | 1 |

== Broadcast ==
The festival was broadcast in the 14 participating countries and in Costa Rica, Ecuador, El Salvador, Guatemala, Honduras, Nicaragua, Paraguay, and the United States, where the corresponding OTI member broadcasters relayed the contest through their networks. It was also reported that it was broadcast in Yugoslavia, the Netherlands, and Sweden, making a total of twenty-five countries. The event was originally broadcast in color, although many of the participating broadcasters were still transmitting in black and white.

Known details on the broadcasts of the festival in each country, including the specific broadcasting stations, commentators, and presenters of the local opt-out are shown in the tables below.

Broadcasters, commentators, and local presenters in participating countries
| Country | Broadcaster | Channel(s) | Commentator(s) | Local presenter(s) | Ref. |
|---|---|---|---|---|---|
| Argentina | Televisión Argentina | Canal 7 | | | |
| Brazil | Rede Tupi | TV Itacolomi | | | |
| Brazil | Rede Tupi | TV Paraná | | | |
| Brazil | Rede Tupi | TV Tupi Rio de Janeiro | | | |
| Colombia | Inravisión (Note: Through the programadoras: Caracol Televisión, Producciones Nacionales Colombianas de Hoy (PUNCH), and Radio Televisión Interamericana (RTI).) | Canal Nacional | | | |
| Mexico | Televisa | Canal 2 | | Raúl Velasco | |
| Spain | TVE | TVE 1 | José María Íñigo | José Luis Uribarri | |

Broadcasters and commentators in non-participating countries
| Country | Broadcaster | Channel(s) | Commentator(s) | Ref. |
|---|---|---|---|---|
| United States | SIN (Note: Delayed broadcast on 18 November by all SIN affiliates, each in their own time zone.) | | | |

== Reception ==
It was estimated that this edition reached over 200 million potential viewers total, which was 100 million more than the previous edition. Mexico, partly thanks to the success of its national final, was again the country where the festival had more viewers to the point that the country was paralysed during the event.

"Qué alegre va María", the winning song, was warmly received by the Mexican audience and launched the career of Imelda Miller in Latin America. Another successful song was the Spanish entry "Algo más" by Camilo Sesto which became a smash hit both in Spain and in Latin América. He later became a staple of Spanish music in the 1970s all around Latin America after releasing more hits.
