= Netherlands Antilles in the OTI Festival 1984 =

- OTI Festival 1984
- Participating broadcaster: Antilliaanse Televisie Maatschappij (ATM)
- Country: Netherlands Antilles
- Selection process: Antillean OTI Festival
- Selection date: 30 September 1984

Competing entry
- Song: "La verdad"
- Artist: Gabriel Flores
- Songwriter: Gabriel Flores

Placement
- Final result: Finalist

Participation chronology
◄1983 •	1984	• 1985►

The Netherlands Antilles was represented at the OTI Festival 1984 with the song "La verdad", written and performed by Gabriel Flores. The Netherlands Antillean participating broadcaster, Antilliaanse Televisie Maatschappij (ATM), selected its entry through a televised national final. The song, that was performed in position 1, was not among the top-three places revealed.

== National stage ==
Antilliaanse Televisie Maatschappij (ATM), held a national final to select its entry for the 13th edition of the OTI Festival. Sixteen songs were selected for the televised final, eight each from Aruba and Curaçao. The singers had to be from the Antilles; the composers had to reside in the Antilles, and the songs had to be sung in Spanish.

=== Aruban pre-selection ===
The Aruban pre-selection was held on Sunday 9 September 1984 at the Rembrandt Room of the Aruba Palmbeach Hotel in Palm Beach, to select eight songs for the national final from among twenty-four candidates. Beginning at 20:00 AST (00:00+1 UTC), the show was opened with Franklin Granadillo guest performing the national anthem on the trumpet.

Among the candidates were Efrem Benita, Sharon Rose, and Claudius Philips, who had respectively won the three previous national finals in 1981, 1982, and 1983. The twenty-four competing acts were:

Aruban pre-selection participants
- Jeanette Baiz
- Frank Jeandor
- Papito Rafael
- Giovani Arends
- Marcelino Paesch
- Didi Wernet
- Lilian Boekhoudt
- Ronny Koek
- Kenneth Samson
- Gabriel Flores
- Mylene Josette
- Ito Danmia
- Olivia Murray
- Melao (Sharon Rose and Efrem Benita)
- Imelda Soleano
- Chicho Kock
- Yolanda van der Linden
- Francis Jacobs
- Carmen Herrera
- Jeanice Tromp
- Clara del Dia
- Tommy de Cuba
- Ted Philips
- Claudius Philips

The festival had two groups of jurors, one for the song and the other for the voice. The group of jurors for the song were: Rafi Maduro, Ted Schouten, Etty Toppenberg, Eric Escalona, and Gemma Orman, who was assistant to jury chairwoman Martha Figaroa. The group of jurors for the voice were: Magdaline Roos, Lila Koek-Richardson, and Mary Tsing, who was assistant to jury chairman Boei Heronimo.

Yolanda van der Linden won the Voz di oro female award and Efrem Benita won the Voz di oro male award. Sharon Rose won the Voz supreme female award and Gabirel Flores won the Voz supreme male award. Claudius Philips won the award for most popular singer, and Franklin Granadillo and Ruben Geerman for best conductors. "Soy de Antillas" performed by Papito Rafael, "Duérmete ya" by Marcelino Paesch, "Siempre te amaré" by Kenneth Samson, "La verdad" by Gabriel Flores, "Perderte no" by Melao, "Dame paz" by Tommy de Cuba, "Por el bien de la paz" by Ted Philips, and "El amor" by Claudius Philips qualified for the national final.

=== National final ===
ATM held the national final on Sunday 30 September 1984, beginning at 18:00 AST (22:00 UTC), at its studios in Oranjestad. It was presented by Yolanda Arends and Ruben Garcia, and broadcast live on TeleAruba and TeleCuraçao. The musical director was Oscar Cerano; and Trio Huasteca performed as guest artists.

The jury consisted of: Oslin Begilia and Henny van Velzen from Curaçao, César Lippo from Venezuela, and Maybelline Arends-Croes and Raffi Camacho from Aruba, presided over by notary Edgar Laclé, assisted by Roxanna Lopez.

The winner was "La verdad", written and performed by Gabriel Flores. Minister Hendrik Croes and Leo Tromp presented the trophies to the winner. The festival ended with a reprise of the winning entry.

Winner

Result of the Antillean OTI Festival 1984
R/O	Song	Artist	Result
1	"Soy de Antillas"	Papito Rafael	
2	"Soledad"	Robert Davelaar	
3	"El amor"	Claudius Philips	
4	"Duérmete ya"	Marcelino Paesch	
5	"Nuestra canción"	Eric Adamus	
6	"Volvamos a empezar"	William Anthony	
7	"Te extraño"	Carlos Salsbach	
8	"Por el bien de la paz"	Ted Philips	
9	"La verdad"	Gabriel Flores	1
10	"Eso eres tú"	Rudsel Godfried	
11	"Ya no te quiero"	Juni Juliet	
12	"Perderte no"	Melao	
13	"Dime viento"	Rignald Vidal	
14	"Yo soy el amor"	Lucho Carelli	
15	"Dame paz"	Tommy de Cuba	
16	"Siempre te amaré"	Kenneth Samson	

== At the OTI Festival ==
On 10 November 1984, the OTI Festival was held at the National Auditorium in Mexico City, Mexico, hosted by Televisa, and broadcast live throughout Ibero-America. Gabriel Flores performed "La verdad" in position 1, with Rubén Germán conducting the event's orchestra. The song was not among the top-three places revealed.

The festival was broadcast live on TeleAruba and TeleCuraçao.
