= Netherlands Antilles in the OTI Festival 1983 =

- OTI Festival 1983
- Participating broadcaster: Antilliaanse Televisie Maatschappij (ATM)
- Country: Netherlands Antilles
- Selection process: OTI Antiyas 1983
- Selection date: 25 September 1983

Competing entry
- Song: "En cada nota cantará tu voz"
- Artist: Claudius Philips
- Songwriters: Ricardo del Carmen González; Claudius Philips

Placement
- Final result: Top-5

Participation chronology
◄1982 •	1983	• 1984►

The Netherlands Antilles was represented at the OTI Festival 1983 with the song "En cada nota cantará tu voz", written by Ricardo del Carmen González and Claudius Philips, and performed by Philips himself. The Netherlands Antillean participating broadcaster, Antilliaanse Televisie Maatschappij (ATM), selected its entry through a televised national final. The song, that was performed in position 21, placed in the top-5, out of 21 competing entries. It was the best result of the Netherlands Antilles in the festival.

== National stage ==
Antilliaanse Televisie Maatschappij (ATM), held a national final to select its entry for the 12th edition of the OTI Festival. Sixteen entries were selected for the televised final. Originally, Aruba and Curaçao would select seven entries each, and Bonaire and the Windward Islands one each. This was later changed to Aruba and Curaçao selecting eight entries each.

=== Curaçaoan pre-selection ===
TeleCuraçao organized a televised pre-selection to select its eight songs for the national final. It was staged on Saturday 3 September 1983 at the ATM studios in Willemstad, beginning at 18:00 AST (22:00 UTC).

=== Aruban pre-selection ===
The Aruban pre-selection to select eight songs for the national final was held on Sunday 11 September 1983, beginning at 20:00 AST (00:00+1 UTC), (Note: The Aruban pre-selection was originally planned for 3 September 1983, but was postponed to 11 September due to the death of musician Alex "Echi" Odor the previous month.) at the Aruba Palmbeach Hotel in Palm Beach. It was presented by Gerda Salas and Tico Kuiperi. The show was opened with Sharon Rose, who had won the national final the previous year, guest performing the national anthem, and the sixteen participants singing the festival theme song "Cantante canta". The jury consisted of Martha Figaroa, Sharon Rose, Tirso Steba, and Rafi Camacho, and Gemma Orman, who assisted chairman Ivan Jansen. The sixteen competing acts were:

Aruban pre-selection participants
- Beatrix Ras
- Claudius Philips
- Daphney Martijn
- Dennis Raghunath
- Doodle Sofia
- Edwin Abath
- Efrem Benita
- Jeanice Tromp
- Juancho Ignacio
- Marcelino Paesch
- Marienne
- Olivia Murray
- Papito Rafael
- Teddy Phillips
- The Young Voices
- Tommy and Francis

Edwin Abath won both Voz di oro and Voz supreme male awards with "Deja cantar a mi pueblo"; but since the rules did not allow receiving both titles, the Voz di oro male award went to Claudius Philips with "En cada nota cantará tu voz". Jeanice Tromp won the Voz supreme female award with "Amor sin contratos" and Olivia Murray won the Voz di oro female award with "Sólo una vez". Franklin Granadillo won the award for best arranger, Roberto Montiel for best conductor, and Jeanice Tromp for most popular singer. The songs performed by Dennis Raghunath, Marcelino Paesch, Edwin Abath, Olivia Murray, Tommy and Francis, Efrem Benita, Claudius Philips, and The Young Voices qualified for the national final.

=== National final ===
ATM held the national final on Sunday 25 September 1983, beginning at 18:00 AST (22:00 UTC), at its studio 1 in Willemstad. It was broadcast live on both TeleCuraçao and TeleAruba.

The winner was "En cada nota cantará tu voz", written by Ricardo del Carmen González and Claudius Philips, and performed by Philips himself.

Winner

Result of OTI Antiyas 1983
Island territory	Song	Artist	Result
Aruba	"En cada nota cantará tu voz"	Claudius Philips	1
Aruba		Dennis Raghunath	
Aruba	"Deja cantar a mi pueblo"	Edwin Abath	
Aruba		Efrem Benita	
Aruba		Marcelino Paesch	
Aruba	"Sólo una vez"	Olivia Murray	
Aruba		The Young Voices	
Aruba		Tommy and Francis	
Curaçao	8 unknown finalists from the Curaçaoan pre-selection		

== At the OTI Festival ==
On 29 October 1983, the OTI Festival was held at the DAR Constitution Hall in Washington, D.C., United States, hosted by the Spanish International Network (SIN), and broadcast live throughout Ibero-America. Claudius Philips performed "En cada nota cantará tu voz" in position 21, with Franklin Granadillo conducting the event's orchestra. From the five highest-scoring entries, only the top three were announced. The song made the top-five cut but fell short of the top three. This was the best result of the Netherlands Antilles in the festival.

The festival was broadcast live on TeleAruba and TeleCuraçao.

=== Voting ===
Each participating broadcaster, or group of broadcasters that jointly participated representing a country, appointed a juror who secretly scored each entry in a scale of 1–5 points, except for the entry representing its own country. The Netherlands Antillean juror was Joy Kock.
