= Aruba in the OTI Festival 1989 =

- OTI Festival 1989
- Participating broadcaster: TeleAruba
- Country: Aruba
- Selection process: Aruban OTI Festival
- Selection date: 6 September 1987

Competing entry
- Song: "Mi viejo"
- Artist: Edwin Abath
- Songwriters: Edwin Abath; Don Ramon Krozendijk

Placement
- Final result: Finalist

Participation chronology
1989	• 1991►

Aruba was represented at the OTI Festival 1989 with the song "Mi viejo", written by Edwin Abath and Don Ramon Krozendijk, and performed by Abath himself. The Aruban participating broadcaster, TeleAruba, selected its entry through a national final. The song, that was performed in position 5, was not among the top-three places revealed. This was the first entry from Aruba as an independent participant in the festival, having been represented until then as part of the Netherlands Antilles.

TeleAruba intended to enter the song to the OTI Festival 1987, which would be the first participation for Aruba as an independent participant in the festival, but due to a miscommunication with the Organización de Televisión Iberoamericana (OTI), the debut was not possible. The song was ultimately submitted to the 1989 festival, when the debut was finally possible.

== Background ==
Until 1986, Aruba was part of the Netherlands Antilles, and TeleAruba was a station of Antilliaanse Televisie Maatschappij (ATM). After Aruba obtained its separate status, TeleAruba became independent from ATM, applied to become a full member of the Organización de Televisión Iberoamericana (OTI), and intended to debut at the OTI Festival 1987 as an independent participant.

Since ATM began selecting its entry for the OTI Festival through a national final in 1978, a public pre-selection to choose its entries for the Antillean national final was constantly held in Aruba. Of the eight Antillean national finals in which Aruba was involved, seven were won by Aruban entires, and represented the Netherlands Antilles in the festival.

== National stage ==
In 1987, TeleAruba held a national selection with two phases to select its entry for the 16th edition of the OTI Festival, in what would be Aruba's debut as an independent participant in the festival.

=== Pre-selection ===
A pre-selection was held on Sunday 5 July 1987 at the Golden Tulip Aruba Caribbean Hotel in Palm Beach. Of the competing entries, seventeen qualified for the national final.

The winner of the pre-selection was "Mi viejo", written by Don Ramon Krozendijk and Edwin Abath and performed by Abath himself; with Claudius Philips placing second, and Sergio Tjoe-A-Loi placing third. The song performed by Juancho Ignacio, Francis Jacobs, Chicho Kock, Marion Istatia, Albi Navas, Tommy de Cuba, Marcelino Paesch, Don Ramon, Yvette and Lupe Thomas, Junior de Freitas, Mylene Marquez, Ito Dania, Sigfried Godoy, and Didi Wernet, also qualified for the national final.

=== National final ===
TeleAruba held the national final on Sunday 6 September 1987, beginning at 18:00 AST (22:00 UTC), at Cas di Cultura in Oranjestad. The musical director was Franklin Granadillo.

The winner was "Mi viejo", written by Don Ramon Krozendijk and Edwin Abath and performed by Abath himself.

Winner

Result of the Aruban OTI Festival 1987
R/O	Song	Artist	Result
1		Tommy de Cuba	
2		Sergio Tjoe-A-Loi	
3		Didi Wernet	
4		Francis Jacobs	
5		Mylene Marquez	
6		Claudius Philips	
7	"Mi viejo"	Edwin Abath	1
8		Chicho Kock	
9		Marion Istatia	
10		Junior de Freitas	
11		Yvette and Lupe Thomas	
12		Don Ramon	
13		Marcelino Paesch	
14		Sigfried Godoy	
15		Albi Navas	
16		Juancho Ignacio	
17		Ito Dania	

=== Aftermath ===
Due to a miscommunication between TeleAruba and OTI, the debut of Aruba in the festival was not possible in 1987. TeleAruba announced that it would enter the song in the 1988 festival; but this did not happen until the 1989 festival.

== At the OTI Festival ==
On 18 November 1989, the OTI Festival was held at the theater of the James L. Knight Center in Miami, United States, hosted by Univision, and broadcast live throughout Ibero-America. Edwin Abath performed "Mi viejo" in position 7, with Franklin Granadillo conducting the event's orchestra. The song was not among the top-three places revealed.

The festival was broadcast live on TeleAruba.
