= Netherlands Antilles in the OTI Festival 1980 =

- OTI Festival 1980
- Participating broadcaster: Antilliaanse Televisie Maatschappij (ATM)
- Country: Netherlands Antilles
- Selection process: Antillean OTI Festival
- Selection date: 28 September 1980

Competing entry
- Song: "Amor para ti"
- Artist: Lidwina Booi
- Songwriters: Nena Bennet; Eddy Bennet

Placement
- Final result: 22nd, 0 points

Participation chronology
◄1979 •	1980	• 1981►

The Netherlands Antilles was represented at the OTI Festival 1980 with the song "Amor para ti", written by Nena Bennet and Eddy Bennet, and performed by Lidwina Booi. The Netherlands Antillean participating broadcaster, Antilliaanse Televisie Maatschappij (ATM), selected its entry through a televised national final. The song, that was performed in position 12, placed twenty-second out of 23 competing entries, tied with the entry from Bolivia with 0 points.

== National stage ==
Antilliaanse Televisie Maatschappij (ATM), held a national final to select its entry for the 9th edition of the OTI Festival. Sixteen songs would be selected for the televised final, seven each from Aruba and Curaçao, and one each from Bonaire and the Dutch Windward Islands. Pre-selections were held on Saturday 30 August 1980 in Sint Maarten, on Saturday 6 September in Bonaire, on Sunday 14 September in Curaçao, and on Sunday 21 September in Aruba.

=== Curaçaoan pre-selection ===
The Curaçaoan pre-selection was held on Sunday 14 September 1980 at the Cave de Neptune Room of the Plaza Hotel Curaçao in Willemstad, to select seven songs for the national final from among ten candidates. The songs performed by Harrie Zimmerman, Orlando Victoria, Juny Juliet, Farley Lourens, Mr. Dynomite, Filomena, and Wilbert Domacassé qualified for the national final.

=== Aruban pre-selection ===
The Aruban pre-selection was held on Sunday 21 September 1980, beginning at 19:30 AST (23:30 UTC), at the Rembrandt Room of the Sheraton Hotel in Palm Beach, to select seven songs for the national final.

Lidwina Booi won the Voz supremo di Aruba award with "Amor para ti", with Efrem Benita in second place with "Quiero cantar", and Don Ramon in third place with "Un gran amor". Danilo Santinili won the award for best songwriter, and Gilda Fernandez for most popular singer. In addition to "Amor para ti" by Lidwina Booi, "Quiero cantar" by Efrem Benita, and "Un gran amor" by Don Ramon, the songs performed by Trio Steba, Henky Braafhart, Tommy de Cuba, and Luis Rodolfo also qualified for the national final. Betico Croes, Nelson Oduber, and Wilfred Ho Sing Loy presented the trophies and prizes to the winners.

=== National final ===
ATM held the national final on Sunday 28 September 1980, beginning at 17:00 AST (21:00 UTC), at its studios in Willemstad, and broadcast on TeleAruba and TeleCuraçao. Fourteen songs ultimately participated in the final, as there were no songs from Bonaire or the Dutch Windward Islands.

The winner was "Amor para ti", written by Nena Bennet and Eddy Bennet, and performed by Lidwina Booi.

Winner

Result of the Antillean OTI Festival 1980
R/O	Song	Artist	Result
	"Amor para ti"	Lidwina Booi	1
	"Quiero cantar"	Efrem Benita	
	"Un gran amor"	Don Ramon	
		Trio Steba	
		Henky Braafhart	
		Tommy de Cuba	
		Luis Rodolfo	
		Harrie Zimmerman	
		Orlando Victoria	
		Juny Juliet	
		Farley Lourens	
		Mr. Dynomite	
		Filomena	
		Wilbert Domacassé	

== At the OTI Festival ==
On 15 November 1980, the OTI Festival was held at the Martín Coronado hall of the Teatro General San Martín in Buenos Aires, Argentina, hosted by Argentina Televisora Color (ATC), and broadcast live throughout Ibero-America. Lidwina Booi performed "Amor para ti" in position 12, with Roberto Montiel conducting the event's orchestra, placing twenty-second out of 23 competing entries, tied with the entry from Bolivia with 0 points.

The festival was broadcast live on TeleAruba and TeleCuraçao.

=== Voting ===
Each participating broadcaster assembled a jury who awarded 5–1 points to their five favourite songs in order of preference. The Netherlands Antilles did not receive any points.

Points awarded by the Netherlands Antilles
Score	Country
5 points	Portugal
4 points	Argentina
3 points	Spain
2 points	Venezuela
1 point	Dominican Republic
