= Netherlands Antilles in the OTI Festival 1979 =

- OTI Festival 1979
- Participating broadcaster: Antilliaanse Televisie Maatschappij (ATM)
- Country: Netherlands Antilles
- Selection process: Antillean OTI Festival
- Selection date: 4 November 1979

Competing entry
- Song: "Mi niño"
- Artist: Don Ramon
- Songwriters: Don Ramon Krozendijk; Burt Welch

Placement
- Final result: 9th, 16 points

Participation chronology
◄1978 •	1979	• 1980►

The Netherlands Antilles was represented at the OTI Festival 1979 with the song "Mi niño", written by Don Ramon Krozendijk and Burt Welch, and performed by Don Ramon himself. The Netherlands Antillean participating broadcaster, Antilliaanse Televisie Maatschappij (ATM), selected its entry through a televised national final. The song, that was performed in position 1, placed ninth out of 21 competing entries, tied with the entry from the United States with 16 points.

== National stage ==
Antilliaanse Televisie Maatschappij (ATM), held a national final to select its entry for the 8th edition of the OTI Festival. Sixteen songs would be selected for the televised final, seven each from Aruba and Curaçao, and one each from Bonaire and the Dutch Windward Islands.

=== Aruban pre-selection ===
The Aruban pre-selection was held on Sunday 9 September 1979, beginning at 20:00 AST (00:00+1 UTC), at the ballroom of the Americana Aruba Hotel in Palm Beach, to select seven songs for the national final from among fifteen candidates. The participants were accompanied by the Ruben Lobo orchestra. The show was presented by Ruben Garcia, and featured guest performances by Sandra Croes, Tito Lacle, Lilian Boekhoudt, The Young Voices, and Trio Huasteca.

Lidwina Booi won the Voz supremo di Aruba award with "Deseo", with Roy Laclé in second place with "Nesesito saber por qué te fuiste", and Rudy Stone in third place with "Pobre mirar el sol". Henky Braafhart won the award for most popular singer with "La cosa nuestra". Nelson Oduber and Betico Croes presented the awards.

Qualifier

Result of the Aruban pre-selection for the Antillean OTI Festival 1979
R/O	Song	Artist	Songwriter(s) (Note: The reported songwriters were: Eddy Bennett, Tito Flores, Frank Sneek, Efrem Benita, Jossy Brokke jr., Ruben Lobo, Roberto Montiel, Pepe Gonzalez, Danilo Santinelli, Fernando Galimany, Bartolomeo Broad, and Don Ramon Krozendijk.)	Result
1	"En mí"	Shalene Tromp		—N/a
2	"Mi ruego"	Juancho Ignacio		Qualified
3	"Mi niño"	Don Ramon	Don Ramon Krozendijk; Burt Welch	Qualified
4	"Seré tu amigo"	Efrem Benita	Efrem Benita	—N/a
5		Rafael del Rosario		—N/a
6	"Pobre mirar el sol"	Rudy Stone		Qualified
7	"La cosa nuestra"	Henky Braafhart		—N/a
8	"Deseo"	Lidwina Booi	Nena Bennet; Eddy Bennet	Qualified
9		Suzette de Cuba		—N/a
10	"Mi niña"	Tirso Steba	Eddy Bennett	Qualified
11		Jossy Brokke jr.	Jossy Brokke jr.	—N/a
12		Juanita Chirino		—N/a
13	"La libertad es una idea y nada más"	Tommy de Cuba		Qualified
14		Joselyne Jacobs		—N/a
15	"Nesesito saber por qué te fuiste"	Roy Laclé		Qualified

=== National final ===
ATM held the national final on Sunday 4 November 1979, beginning at 18:00 AST (22:00 UTC), at Cas di Cultura in Oranjestad, presented by Ruben Garcia and Yolanda Tromp. The musical director was Roberto Montiel. The show featured an opening act by Lilian Boekhoudt guest performing "Cantante canta", and an interval act by Trío Huasteca. The event was broadcast live on the radio on Voz di Aruba, and TeleAruba tape-recorded it.

As there were no songs from Bonaire or the Dutch Windward Islands, it was decided that eighteen songs would ultimately participate in the final, nine each from Aruba and Curaçao. Since no pre-selection had been carried out in Curaçao due to a lack of interest, in the end there were only fifteen songs in the final. The jury was composed of A. Laclé (as chairman), Oswald Specht, and Nita Doval from Curaçao; and Edwin Zichem and Rufo Odor from Aruba.

The winner was "Mi niño", written by Don Ramon Krozendijk and Burt Welch, and performed by Don Ramon himself. The festival ended with a reprise of the winning entry.

Winner

Result of the Antillean OTI Festival 1979
R/O	Song	Artist	Result
1	"Celos"	Erwin Coffie	
2	"Dime qué es lo que tengo que hacer"	Albert Duncan	
3	"En mí"	Shalene Tromp	
4	"Qué tan pronto"	Luis Santana	
5	"Deseo"	Lidwina Booi	
6	"Así es la juventud"	Jesusito Juliet	
7	"La libertad es una idea y nada más"	Tommy de Cuba	
8	"Nesesito saber por qué te fuiste"	Roy Laclé	
9	"Canción al amor"	Reginald Vidal	
10	"América latina"	Ethel Rose	
11	"Seré tu amigo"	Efrem Benita	
12	"Mi ruego"	Juancho Ignacio	
13	"Mi niño"	Don Ramon	1
14	"Mi niña"	Tirso Steba	
15	"La cosa nuestra"	Henky Braafhart	

== At the OTI Festival ==
On 8 December 1979, the OTI Festival was held at the Theatre of the Military Academy in Caracas, Venezuela, hosted by Radio Caracas Televisión (RCTV), Venevisión, Televisora Nacional (TVN), and Venezolana de Televisión (VTV), and broadcast live throughout Ibero-America. Don Ramon performed "Mi niño" in position 1, with Roberto Montiel conducting the event's orchestra, and placing ninth out of 21 competing entries, tied with the entry from the United States with 16 points.

=== Voting ===
Each participating broadcaster, or group of broadcasters that jointly participated representing a country, assembled a jury who awarded 5–1 points to their five favourite songs in order of preference. ATM instead used its stand-in delegate present at the festival venue to vote for the Netherlands Antilles.

Points awarded to the Netherlands Antilles
Score	Country
5 points	Dominican Republic
4 points	Brazil; Portugal
3 points	Paraguay
2 points	
1 point	

Points awarded by the Netherlands Antilles
Score	Country
5 points	Guatemala
4 points	Portugal
3 points	United States
2 points	Dominican Republic
1 point	Argentina
