= Netherlands Antilles in the OTI Festival =

- OTI Festival
- (1974–1985) (1987–1998)
- Participating broadcaster: Antilliaanse Televisie Maatschappij (ATM)

Participation summary
- Appearances: 19
- First appearance: 1974
- Last appearance: 1998
- Highest placement: Top-5: 1983
- Participation history: 1974; 1975; 1976; 1977; 1978; 1979; 1980; 1981; 1982; 1983; 1984; 1985; 1986; 1987; 1988; 1989; 1990; 1991; 1992; 1993; 1994; 1995 – 1997; 1998; 2000

The participation of the Netherlands Antilles in the OTI Festival began at the third OTI Festival in 1974. The Netherlands Antillean participating broadcaster was Antilliaanse Televisie Maatschappij (ATM), which was member of the Organización de Televisión Iberoamericana (OTI). ATM participated in nineteen of the twenty-eight editions. Its best placing was a top-5 placing in 1983.

== History ==
Antilliaanse Televisie Maatschappij (ATM), whose television stations were TeleAruba and TeleCuraçao, first entered in the OTI Festival in its 3rd edition in 1974, and participated in nineteen of the twenty-eight editions. ATM selected its entry both internally and through a national final.

Although the common official language of the Netherlands Antilles was Dutch, and Papiamento, a Portuguese-based creole language influenced by Dutch and Spanish, was the most widely spoken and also official in Aruba, Bonaire, and Curaçao, all entries in the festival were presented in Spanish.

Efrem Benita, who represented the Netherlands Antilles in 1981 with "Vaya un amigo", won the Eurovision Song Contest 2001 for Estonia as Dave Benton, with "Everybody" along Tanel Padar and 2XL, making him the only Eurovision Song Contest winner who has previously participated in the OTI Festival.

In 1986, when Aruba gained its separate status from the Netherlands Antilles, TeleAruba became independent from ATM, and participated in the festival representing Aruba in 1989 and in 1991, with the Netherlands Antilles absent those editions.

== Participation overview ==
Table key
SF	Semi-finalist
◇	Contest cancelled

Year	Song	Artist	Songwriter(s)	Conductor	Place	Points
1972	Did not participate					
1973	Did not participate					
1974	"Quédate"	Humberto Nivi	Humberto Nivi	Aníbal Abreu	10	3
1975	"Una flor en el balcón"	George Willems	Héctor Garrido; Juan Antonio Mestre; George Willems	Lito Peña	10	3
1976	"El primer criollo"	Jossy Brokke	Jossy Brokke		13	2
1977	"Gente eres tú"	Ced Ride	Ced Ride	Rafael Ibarbia	14	1
1978	"Cuando un amor se muere"	Trío Huazteca	Etty Toppenberg	Roberto Montiel	10	9
1979	"Mi niño"	Don Ramon	Don Ramon Krozendijk; Burt Welch	Roberto Montiel	9	16
1980	"Amor para ti"	Lidwina Booi	Nena Bennet; Eddy Bennet	Roberto Montiel	22	0
1981	"Vaya un amigo"	Efrem Benita	Efrem Benita		20	2
1982	"Alguien que no seas tú"	Sharon Rose	Roberto Montiel	Roberto Montiel	16	7
1983	"En cada nota cantará tu voz"	Claudius Philips	Ricardo del Carmen González; Claudius Philips	Franklin Granadillo	Top-5	—N/a
1984	"La verdad"	Gabriel Flores	Gabriel Flores	Rubén Germán	—N/a	
1985	"Adiós, mi amor"	Melania van der Veen	Erroll Colina	Erroll Colina	—N/a	
1986	Did not participate					
1987	"Hermanos tú y yo"	Rose Heige and Romeo Heige	J. Hart; Lucille Berry-Haseth; Erroll Colina	Erroll Colina	—N/a	
1988	"Una canción para una nación"	Ced Ride	Ced Ride	Erroll Colina	14	0
1989	Did not participate					
1990	"Mujeres"	Nathaly Mardenborough	Shannon R.R. Martha	Clark Elisabeth	—N/a	
1991	Did not participate					
1992	"Vivencias"	Humberto Nivi	Humberto Nivi; Lito Scarso		—N/a	
1993	"Si te vuelvo a encontrar"	Melania Arroyo	Melania Arroyo; José Gregorio	José Gregorio	—N/a	
1994	"Libre"	Boy Thode	Erroll Colina; Frank Cafsia		SF	—N/a
1995	Did not participate					
1996	Did not participate					
1997	Did not participate					
1998	"Los niños"	Fusión Consonante	Lucille Berry-Haseth; Erroll Colina	Errol Colina	SF	—N/a
1999	Contest cancelled ◇					
2000	Did not participate					
