= Netherlands Antilles in the OTI Festival 1982 =

- OTI Festival 1982
- Participating broadcaster: Antilliaanse Televisie Maatschappij (ATM)
- Country: Netherlands Antilles
- Selection process: Antillean OTI Festival
- Selection date: 16 October 1982

Competing entry
- Song: "Alguien que no seas tú"
- Artist: Sharon Rose
- Songwriter: Roberto Montiel

Placement
- Final result: 16th, 7 points

Participation chronology
◄1981 •	1982	• 1983►

The Netherlands Antilles was represented at the OTI Festival 1982 with the song "Alguien que no seas tú", written by Roberto Montiel, and performed by Sharon Rose. The Netherlands Antillean participating broadcaster, Antilliaanse Televisie Maatschappij (ATM), selected its entry through a televised national final. The song, that was performed in position 11, placed sixteenth out of 21 competing entries with 7 points.

== National stage ==
Antilliaanse Televisie Maatschappij (ATM), held a national final to select its entry for the 11th edition of the OTI Festival. Eighteen songs were selected for the televised final, seven each from Aruba and Curaçao, and two each from Bonaire and the Dutch Windward Islands.

=== Aruban pre-selection ===
The Aruban pre-selection was held on Saturday 2 October 1982 at the Aruba Palmbeach Hotel in Palm Beach, to select seven songs for the national final from among fifteen candidates. It was presented by Gerda Salas and Ruben Garcia. The show was opened with Efrem Benita, who had won the national final the previous year, guest performing the national anthem, and Jeanice Tromp the festival theme song "Cantante canta". After all the competing entries were performed, a tribute was paid to the choir Vivons en Chantant, which celebrated its silver jubilee.

The jury consisted of Magda Laclé-Figaroa, Lila Kock-Richardson, Hilda Wijnaar, Boei Heronimo, Rubén Geerman, Ricardo del Carmen González, and Gemma Orman, who was assistant to jury chairman Rufo Odor.

Faritah Luidens won the Voz di oro female award with "Veo visiones" and Walter de Cuba won the Voz di oro male award with "La que quiso ser mujer". Sharon Rose won the Voz supreme female award with "Alguien que no seas tú" and Juancho Ignacio won the Voz supreme male award with "Viva la música". Daphney Martijn won the award for most popular singer with "Esta vez", Franklin Granadillo for best arranger, and Roberto Montiel for best conductor. In addition to "Alguien que no seas tú" by Sharon Rose, "Veo visiones" by Faritah Luidens, "La que quiso ser mujer" by Walter de Cuba, and "Viva la música" by Juancho Ignacio; "Amor es algo bello" by Francis Jacobs, "Dame tu mundo de amor" by Olivia Murray, and "Juzgada estás" by Eddy Kroon, also qualified for the national final.

=== National final ===
ATM held the national final on Saturday 16 October 1982, beginning at 18:00 AST (22:00 UTC), at its studios in Oranjestad. It was broadcast live on TeleAruba. Efrem Benita guest performed the winning songs of the previous four Antillean national finals.

The winner was "Alguien que no seas tú", written by Roberto Montiel, and performed by Sharon Rose. Trophies were presented by minister of culture Leslie Navarro, provincial executive Nelson Oduber, and TeleAruba director Mayra Maduro-Arends.

Winner

Result of the Antillean OTI Festival 1982 (Note: Incomplete list of the eighteen competing entries.)
R/O	Song	Artist	Result
	"Alguien que no seas tú"	Sharon Rose	1
	"Ámame y siénteme"	Lucho Carelli	
	"Amor es algo bello"	Francis Jacobs	
	"Dame tu mundo de amor"	Olivia Murray	
	"La naturaleza"	Tony Fernan	
	"La que quiso ser mujer"	Walter de Cuba	
	"Mi ventana"	Harry Zimmerman	
	"Juzgada estás"	Eddy Kroon	
	"Suena guitarra suena"	Juni Juliet	
	"Veo visiones"	Faritah Luidens	
	"Viva la música"	Juancho Ignacio	

== At the OTI Festival ==
On 27 November 1982, the OTI Festival was held at the Coliseo Amauta in Lima, Peru, hosted by Panamericana Televisión, and broadcast live throughout Ibero-America. Sharon Rose performed "Alguien que no seas tú" in position 11, with Roberto Montiel conducting the event's orchestra, placing sixteenth out of 21 competing entries with 7 points.

The festival was broadcast live on TeleAruba,, and on delay at 19:30 AST (23:30 UTC) on TeleCuraçao.

=== Voting ===
Each participating broadcaster, or group of broadcasters that jointly participated representing a country, appointed a juror who awarded 5–1 points to their five favourite songs in order of preference. The Netherlands Antillean juror was Joy Kock.

Points awarded to the Netherlands Antilles
Score	Country
5 points	Argentina
4 points	
3 points	
2 points	Dominican Republic
1 point	

Points awarded by the Netherlands Antilles
Score	Country
5 points	Argentina
4 points	Colombia
3 points	United States
2 points	Mexico
1 point	Venezuela
