= Aruba in the OTI Festival =

- OTI Festival
- Participating broadcaster: TeleAruba

Participation summary
- Appearances: 2
- First appearance: 1989
- Last appearance: 1991
- Participation history: 1989; 1990; 1991; 1992 – 2000

The participation of the Aruba in the OTI Festival began at the eighteenth OTI Festival in 1989. The Aruban participating broadcaster was TeleAruba, which was member of the Organización de Televisión Iberoamericana (OTI). TeleAruba only participated in two editions, in 1989 and 1991.

== Background ==
Until 1986, Aruba was part of the Netherlands Antilles, and TeleAruba was a station of Antilliaanse Televisie Maatschappij (ATM). After Aruba obtained its separate status, TeleAruba became independent from ATM, and applied to become a full member of the Organización de Televisión Iberoamericana (OTI).

Since ATM began selecting its entry for the OTI Festival through a national final in 1978, a public pre-selection to choose its entries for the Antillean national final was constantly held in Aruba. Of the eight Antillean national finals in which Aruba was involved, seven were won by Aruban entries, and represented the Netherlands Antilles in the festival.

Although the official languages of Aruba were Dutch and Papiamento, a Portuguese-based creole language influenced by Dutch and Spanish, all entries in the festival were presented in Spanish.

For its debut in the 1987 festival, TeleAruba selected though a national final the song "Mi viejo", written by Don Ramon Krozendijk and Edwin Abath and performed by Abath himself. But due to a miscommunication with OTI, the debut of Aruba in the festival was not possible in 1987. TeleAruba announced that it would enter the song in the 1988 festival; but this did not happen until the 1989 festival.

TeleAruba participated for second, and last time, in the 1991 festival, this time with "Mi buena amiga", written by Etty Toppenberg, and performed by Trio Huazteca. Trio Huazteca had already represented the Netherlands Antilles in 1978.

== Participation overview ==
Table key
SF	Semi-finalist

Year	Song	Artist	Songwriter(s)	Conductor	Place	Points
1989	"Mi viejo"	Edwin Abath	Don Ramon Krozendijk; Edwin Abath	Franklin Granadillo	—N/a	
1990	Did not participate					
1991	"Mi buena amiga"	Trio Huazteca	Etty Toppenberg	Amado Rosina	SF	—N/a
