= Nos Pais Television =

Nos Pais
- Willemstad; Curaçao
- Channels: Analog: 4

Ownership
- Owner: Mavis Albertina

History
- Founded: 2012
- First air date: January 1, 2014

Links
- Website: www.nospais.com

Nos Pais (English: Our Country) is a television station that broadcasts on NTSC channel 4 in Curaçao. Its programming is in several languages: Papiamento, Dutch and English. Mavis Albertina founded the network in 2012 with the objective of creating a much more involved society in the Dutch Caribbean. Nos Pais Television has a modern studio complex in the Saliña area and has invested in high-definition television technology.

In May 2026, it obtained total rights to the 2026 FIFA World Cup, the first with Curaçao taking part.

== See also ==
- List of television stations in the Caribbean
- TeleCuraçao
- Telearuba
- 15 ATV
- RTV-7
