= Netherlands Antilles in the OTI Festival 1981 =

- OTI Festival 1981
- Participating broadcaster: Antilliaanse Televisie Maatschappij (ATM)
- Country: Netherlands Antilles
- Selection process: Antillean OTI Festival
- Selection date: 8 November 1981

Competing entry
- Song: "Vaya un amigo"
- Artist: Efrem Benita
- Songwriter: Efrem Benita

Placement
- Final result: 20th, 2 points

Participation chronology
◄1980 •	1981	• 1982►

The Netherlands Antilles was represented at the OTI Festival 1981 with the song "Vaya un amigo", written and performed by Efrem Benita. The Netherlands Antillean participating broadcaster, Antilliaanse Televisie Maatschappij (ATM), selected its entry through a televised national final. The song, that was performed in position 12, placed twentieth out of 21 competing entries with 2 points.

== National stage ==
Antilliaanse Televisie Maatschappij (ATM), held a national final to select its entry for the 10th edition of the OTI Festival. Sixteen songs were selected for the televised final, seven each from Aruba and Curaçao, and one each from Bonaire and the Dutch Windward Islands. Composers could participate with as many songs as they wished, in any island region; however, they had to select a singer from the island region in which the song was presented. The performers had to be of Dutch nationality, while the composers had to be from the Antilles.

=== Aruban pre-selection ===
The Aruban pre-selection was held on Sunday 1 November 1981 at the Sheraton Hotel in Palm Beach, to select seven songs for the national final. Efrem Benita participated in this pre-selection with his song "Vaya un amigo", and qualified for the national final.

=== National final ===
ATM held the national final on Sunday 8 November 1981, beginning at 18:00 AST (22:00 UTC), at its studios in Oranjestad. It was broadcast live on TeleAruba, and was presented by Ronny Brete and F. Ray.

The winner was "Vaya un amigo", written and performed by Efrem Benita from Aruba. The performer's trophy was delivered to him by Lesley Navarro, minister of culture; the song's trophy by Mayra Maduro-Arends, director of TeleAruba; and the composer's trophy by Frans Figaroa, lieutenant governor of Aruba.

Winner

Result of the Antillean OTI Festival 1981 (Note: Incomplete list of the sixteen competing entries.)
R/O	Song	Artist	Result
	"Vaya un amigo"	Efrem Benita	1
		Ernest Willems	

== At the OTI Festival ==
On 5 December 1981, the OTI Festival was held at the National Auditorium in Mexico City, hosted by Televisa, and broadcast live throughout Ibero-America. Efrem Benita performed "Vaya un amigo" in position 12, placing twentieth with 2 points out of 21 competing entries.

The festival was aired live on TeleAruba and TeleCuraçao.

=== Voting ===
Each participating broadcaster, or group of broadcasters that jointly participated representing a country, assembled a jury who awarded 5–1 points to their five favourite songs in order of preference. ATM instead used its stand-in delegate present at the festival venue to vote for the Netherlands Antilles.

Points awarded to the Netherlands Antilles
Score	Country
5 points	
4 points	
3 points	
2 points	
1 point	Chile; Guatemala

Points awarded by the Netherlands Antilles
Score	Country
5 points	United States
4 points	Mexico
3 points	Honduras
2 points	Chile
1 point	Venezuela
