= Aruba in the OTI Festival 1991 =

- OTI Festival 1991
- Participating broadcaster: TeleAruba
- Country: Aruba
- Selection process: Aruban OTI Festival
- Selection date: 3 November 1991

Competing entry
- Song: "Mi buena amiga"
- Artist: Trio Huazteca
- Songwriter: Etty Toppenberg

Placement
- Semi-final result: Failed to qualify

Participation chronology
| ◄1989 • | 1991 |

Aruba was represented at the OTI Festival 1991 with the song "Mi buena amiga", written by Etty Toppenberg, and performed by Trio Huazteca, composed of Etty Toppenberg, Eric Escalona, and Max Hassell. The Aruban participating broadcaster, TeleAruba, selected its entry through a national final. The song, that was performed in position 21 in the semi-final, did not qualify for the final. Trio Huazteca had already represented the Netherlands Antilles in 1978.

== National stage ==
TeleAruba held a national final to select its entry for the 20th edition of the OTI Festival.

=== National final ===
TeleAruba held the national final on Sunday 3 November 1991, beginning at 18:00 AST (22:00 UTC), at the ballroom of the Aruba Palmbeach Hotel in Palm Beach.

Inki Richardson, Trio Huasteca, Francis Jacobs, Jossy Brokke, Tattoo, Tommy de Cuba, Gabriel Flores, Didi Wernet, Ramphis Tromp, Judella Jeandor, Olga Antonette, Shurby Maria, Junior de Freitas, and Roland Angela registered for the competition.

The winner was "Mi buena amiga", written by Etty Toppenberg, and performed by Trio Huazteca. The trio was composed of Etty Toppenberg, Eric Escalona, and Max Hassell.

Winner

Result of the Aruban OTI Festival 1991 (Note: Incomplete list of the competing entries.)
| R/O | Song | Artist | Result |
|---|---|---|---|
| | "Mi buena amiga" | Trio Huazteca | 1 |

== At the OTI Festival ==
On 13–14 December 1991, the OTI Festival was held at the Salón Teotihuacán of the Centro de Convenciones in Acapulco, Mexico, hosted by Televisa, and broadcast live throughout Ibero-America. Trio Huazteca performed "Mi buena amiga" in position 21 in the semi-final, with Amado Rosina conducting the event's orchestra, and not qualifying for the final.

TeleAruba broadcast the semi-final and final on delay at 20:00 AST (00:00+1 UTC).
