= OTI Festival 1989 =

18th OTI Song Festival

Date and venue
- Final: 18 November 1989
- Venue: James L. Knight Center; Miami, United States

Organization
- Organizer: Organización de Televisión Iberoamericana (OTI)
- Host broadcaster: Univision
- Presenters: Lucy Pereda; Antonio Vodanovic; Verónica Castro; Carlos Mata; María Conchita Alonso; Emmanuel; Don Francisco

Participants
- Number of entries: 22
- Debuting countries: Aruba
- Non-returning countries: Netherlands Antilles
- Participation map: Participating countries Countries that participated in the past but not in 1989

Vote
- Voting system: The members of a single jury selected their favourite songs in a secret vote
- Winning song: Mexico "Una canción no es suficiente"

The OTI Festival 1989 (Spanish: Decimoctavo Gran Premio de la Canción Iberoamericana, Portuguese: Décimo Oitavo Grande Prêmio da Canção Ibero-Americana) was the 18th edition of the OTI Festival, held on 18 November 1989 at the theater of the James L. Knight Center in Miami, United States, and presented by Lucy Pereda, Antonio Vodanovic, Verónica Castro, Carlos Mata, María Conchita Alonso, Emmanuel, and Don Francisco. It was organised by the Organización de Televisión Iberoamericana (OTI) and host broadcaster Univision.

Broadcasters from twenty-two countries participated in the festival. The winner was the song "Una canción no es suficiente", written by Jesús Monárrez, and performed by Analí representing Mexico; with "Como una luz", written and performed by José Manuel Soto representing Spain, placing second; and "Te ofrezco", written by Juan Luis Guerra, and performed by Maridalia Hernández representing the Dominican Republic, placing third.

== Location ==
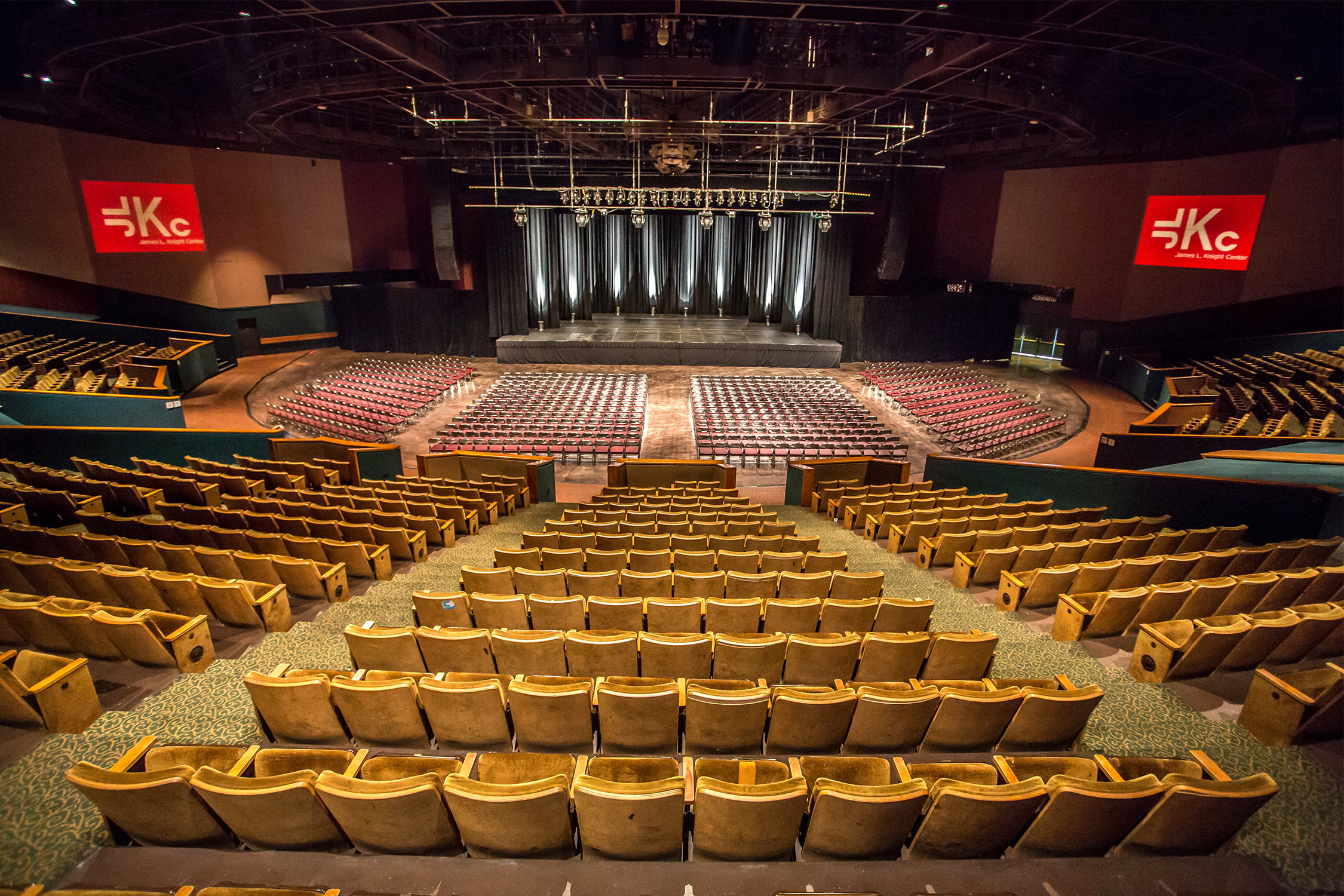
James L. Knight Center, Miami – venue of the OTI Festival 1989.

The Organización de Televisión Iberoamericana (OTI) designated Univision as the host broadcaster for the 18th edition of the OTI Festival. The broadcaster staged the event in Miami. The venue selected was the theater of the James L. Knight Center, which is a venue with a capacity of 4,605 seats within a entertainment and convention complex.

== Participants ==
Broadcasters from twenty-two countries participated in this edition of the OTI festival. The OTI members, public or private broadcasters from Spain, Portugal, and twenty Spanish and Portuguese speaking countries of Ibero-America signed up for the festival. From the countries that participated in the previous edition, the Netherlands Antilles did not return, while Aruba participated in the festival for the first time since the country gained independence from the Netherlands Antilles in 1986.

Some of the participating broadcasters, such as those representing Aruba, Chile, Colombia, Costa Rica, Ecuador, Honduras, Mexico, and the United States, selected their entries through their regular national televised competitions. Other broadcasters decided to select their entry internally.

Two artists returned to the festival representing other countries: Eduardo Fabián representing Uruguay, had won the festival representing the United States in 1986, along Dámaris Carbaugh and Miguel Ángel Guerra; while Aldo Matta representing Puerto Rico had represented the United States in 1981.

Participants of the OTI Festival 1989
| Country | Broadcaster(s) | Song | Artist | Songwriter(s) | Language | Conductor |
|---|---|---|---|---|---|---|
| Argentina | ATC | "Te quedarás en mí" | Mónica Cruz | Daniel García; Mario Schajris | Spanish | |
| Aruba | TeleAruba | "Mi viejo" | Edwin Abath | Edwin Abath; Don Ramon Krozendijk | Spanish | Franklin Granadillo |
| Bolivia | | "Como dos enamorados" | Milton Cortez | Milton Cortez | Spanish | |
| Chile | TVN; UCTV; UTV | "La movida" | Catalina Telias | Scottie Scott | Spanish | Toly Ramírez |
| Colombia | Caracol Televisión; PUNCH; RTI; RCN; JES; Datos y Mensajes | "El artista" | Yolanda González | Cristian Vega Riveros | Spanish | Cristian Vega Riveros |
| Costa Rica | Teletica | "Denme una guitarra" | Allan McPherson | Allan McPherson | Spanish | |
| Dominican Republic | | "Te ofrezco" | Maridalia Hernández | Juan Luis Guerra | Spanish | Manuel Tejeda |
| Ecuador | AECTV | "Mi campesina" | Hermanos Miño Naranjo | Luis Padilla Guevara | Spanish | |
| El Salvador | TCS | "Quisiera" | Gerardo Parker | Johnny Calderón | Spanish | William Sánchez |
| Guatemala | | "Traigo la voz" | Roberto Rey | Orlando Coronado | Spanish | |
| Honduras | | "Al fin la encontré" | Antonio Paredes | Erick Mondragón | Spanish | |
| Mexico | Televisa | "Una canción no es suficiente" | Analí | Jesús Monárrez | Spanish | |
| Nicaragua | | "Días de amar" | Salvador y Katia Cardenal | Salvador Cardenal | Spanish | |
| Panama | | "Era tan solo ayer" | Christian | Christian | Spanish | |
| Paraguay | | "Como aquellas nubes" | Rodolfo González Friedman | Ricardo "Pilo" Lloret | Spanish | |
| Peru | | "Nadie me ama como tú" | Mache | Claudio Fabbri; Armando Massé | Spanish | |
| Portugal | RTP | "Rosa morena" | Marco Paulo | Mário Martins; Nuno Nazareth Fernandes | Portuguese | |
| Puerto Rico | Telemundo Puerto Rico | "Porque no volverás" | Aldo Matta | Gustavo Márquez; Teddy Jaureen; Aldo Matta | Spanish | Eddie Hernández |
| Spain | TVE | "Como una luz" | José Manuel Soto | José Manuel Soto | Spanish | Gualberto García Pérez |
| United States | Univision | "Hazme sentir" | Iris y Margie | Margarita Andino | Spanish | |
| Uruguay | Sociedad Televisora Larrañaga | "Gracias" | Eduardo Fabián | | Spanish | |
| Venezuela | | "Caras perdidas" | Salvador | Rafael Grecco | Spanish | |

== Festival overview ==
The festival was held on Saturday 18 November 1989, beginning at 18:00 EST (23:00 UTC). It was presented by Lucy Pereda, Antonio Vodanovic, Verónica Castro, Carlos Mata, María Conchita Alonso, Emmanuel, and Don Francisco. The show featured Emmanuel, Yuri, and Xuxa as guest artists.

The winner was the song "Una canción no es suficiente", written by Jesús Monárrez, and performed by Analí representing Mexico; with "Como una luz", written and performed by José Manuel Soto representing Spain, placing second; and "Te ofrezco", written by Juan Luis Guerra, and performed by Maridalia Hernández representing the Dominican Republic, placing third. For the first time, the first prize was endowed with a monetary amount of US$20,000, the second prize of US$15,000, and the third prize of US$10,000, to be distributed each 60% to the songwriter and 40% to the performer. The first prize was delivered by Guillermo Cañedo, president of OTI, and Xavier Suarez, major of Miami. The festival ended with a reprise of the winning entry.

Winner

Results of the OTI Festival 1989
| R/O | Country | Song | Artist | Place |
|---|---|---|---|---|
| 1 | El Salvador | "Quisiera" | Gerardo Parker | —N/a |
| 2 | Dominican Republic | "Te ofrezco" | Maridalia Hernández | 3 |
| 3 | Nicaragua | "Días de amar" | Salvador y Katia Cardenal | —N/a |
| 4 | Peru | "Nadie me ama como tú" | Mache | —N/a |
| 5 | Aruba | "Mi viejo" | Edwin Abath | —N/a |
| 6 | Paraguay | "Como aquellas nubes" | Rodolfo González Friedman | —N/a |
| 7 | Colombia | "El artista" | Yolanda González | —N/a |
| 8 | Guatemala | "Traigo la voz" | Roberto Rey | —N/a |
| 9 | Bolivia | "Como dos enamorados" | Milton Cortez | —N/a |
| 10 | Chile | "La movida" | Catalina Telias | —N/a |
| 11 | Honduras | "Al fin la encontré" | Antonio Paredes | —N/a |
| 12 | Ecuador | "Mi campesina" | Hermanos Miño Naranjo | —N/a |
| 13 | Argentina | "Te quedarás en mí" | Mónica Cruz | —N/a |
| 14 | Mexico | "Una canción no es suficiente" | Analí | 1 |
| 15 | Portugal | "Rosa morena" | Marco Paulo | —N/a |
| 16 | Spain | "Como una luz" | José Manuel Soto | 2 |
| 17 | United States | "Hazme sentir" | Iris y Margie | —N/a |
| 18 | Uruguay | "Gracias" | Eduardo Fabián | —N/a |
| 19 | Puerto Rico | "Porque no volverás" | Aldo Matta | —N/a |
| 20 | Costa Rica | "Denme una guitarra" | Allan McPherson | —N/a |
| 21 | Venezuela | "Caras perdidas" | Salvador | —N/a |
| 22 | Panama | "Era tan solo ayer" | Christian | —N/a |

=== Jury ===
Each of the ten members of the single jury selected their favourite songs in a secret vote, and only the top three places were revealed at the end. The members of the jury were:

- Celia Cruz – singer
- Emilio Estefan – producer
- Claudia de Colombia – singer
- Braulio – singer-songwriter
- Ángela Carrasco – singer
- Roberto Livi – singer-songwriter
- Ednita Nazario – singer, represented Puerto Rico in 1979
- Libertad Lamarque – actress
- Lola Beltrán – actress
- Silvia Pinal – actress

== Broadcast ==
The festival was broadcast in the 22 participating countries where the corresponding OTI member broadcasters relayed the contest through their networks after receiving it live via satellite. It was reported that it was also broadcast in the Soviet Union and Bulgaria.

Known details on the broadcasts in each country, including the specific broadcasting stations and commentators are shown in the tables below.

Broadcasters and commentators in participating countries
| Country | Broadcaster | Channel(s) | Commentator(s) | Ref. |
|---|---|---|---|---|
| Argentina | ATC (Note: Delayed broadcast on 19 November at 22:10 DST (01:10+1 UTC)) | | | |
| Aruba | TeleAruba | | | |
| Chile | TVN | Canal 7 (Note: Delayed broadcast at 21:30 CLST (00:30+1 UTC).) | | |
| Chile | UTV | Canal 11 | | |
| Colombia | Inravisión (Note: Through the programadoras: Caracol Televisión, Producciones Nacionales Colombianas de Hoy (PUNCH), Radio Televisión Interamericana (RTI), RCN Televisión, Producciones JES, and Datos y Mensajes.) | Cadena Dos (Note: Delayed broadcast at 21:45 COT (02:45+1 UTC)) | | |
| Costa Rica | Teletica | Canal 7 | | |
| Costa Rica | Teletica | Canal 11 | | |
| Mexico | Televisa | Canal 2 (Note: Delayed broadcast at 19:00 CST (01:00+1 UTC)) | | |
| Portugal | RTP | RTP1 (Note: Delayed broadcast on 25 November at 14:30 WET (14:30 UTC)) | | |
| Spain | TVE | TVE 2 | Alaska | |
| United States | Univision (Note: Delayed broadcast later that day by all Univision affiliates, each in their own time zone.) | | | |
