= Netherlands Antilles in the OTI Festival 1978 =

- OTI Festival 1978
- Participating broadcaster: Antilliaanse Televisie Maatschappij (ATM)
- Country: Netherlands Antilles
- Selection process: Antillean OTI Festival
- Selection date: 23 September 1978

Competing entry
- Song: "Cuando un amor se muere"
- Artist: Trio Huazteca
- Songwriter: Etty Toppenberg

Placement
- Final result: 10th, 9 points

Participation chronology
◄1977 •	1978	• 1979►

The Netherlands Antilles was represented at the OTI Festival 1978 with the song "Cuando un amor se muere", written by Etty Toppenberg, and performed by Trio Huazteca. The Netherlands Antillean participating broadcaster, Antilliaanse Televisie Maatschappij (ATM), selected its entry through a televised national final for the first time. The song, that was performed in position 7, placed tenth out of 19 competing entries with 9 points.

== National stage ==
Antilliaanse Televisie Maatschappij (ATM), held a national final for the first time to select its entry for the 7th edition of the OTI Festival. The broadcaster had internally selected its four previous entries in the festival. A maximum of twenty-four songs would be selected for the televised final, ten each from Aruba and Curaçao, and two each from Bonaire and the Dutch Windward Islands.

The live broadcast of the national final marked a milestone in the history of television broadcasts in the Netherlands Antilles, as it was the first live broadcast outside of a studio and the first in which the cameramen followed a broadcasting script.

=== Aruban pre-selection ===
The Aruban pre-selection was held on Sunday 9 July 1978, beginning at 20:00 AST (00:00+1 UTC), at the Rembrandt Room of the Sheraton Hotel in Palm Beach, to select ten songs for the national final from among twenty-four candidates. The show was presented by Ito Tromp and Ruben Garcia. Roberto Montiel was the musical director. The twenty-four competing acts were:

Aruban pre-selection participants
- Shalene Tromp
- Roy Laclé
- Jossy Brokke jr.
- Edwin Abath
- Trio Hueasteca
- Kenneth Ecury
- Amado Rosina
- Dennis Raghunath
- Gilbert Raven
- Phyllis Gumbs
- Rudy Herrera
- Tony Laclé
- Edwin Coutinho
- Otto Rondon
- Henk Liesdek
- Siegfried Fradl
- John Kelly
- Efrem Benita
- Debbie de Cuba
- Jeff Lind
- Carmen Ruiz-Herrera
- Inneke Atma
- Katijn Werleman
- Tirso Steba

Shalene Tromp won the Voz supremo di Aruba award with "Descubrí tu carta", with Edwin Abath in second place with "Qué pasa contigo", and Tirso Steba in third place with "Insiste en quererte". Roy Laclé won the award for most popular singer. "Descubrí tu carta" by Shalene Tromp, "Qué pasa contigo" by Edwin Abath, "Insistiré en quererte" by Tirso Steba, "Cuando un amor se muere" by Trio Hueasteca, "País de sueños" by Efrem Benita, "Puedo encontrarte" by Sharon Rose, "Amor como el mio" by Siegfried Fradl, "Cosas que pasan" by Roy Laclé, "Adiós al miedo" by Rudy Herrera, and "Responso a un amor" by Jossy Brokke jr., qualified for the national final.

=== National final ===
ATM held the national final on two consecutive evenings, on Friday 22 and Saturday 23 September 1978, at Centro Pro Arte in Willemstad. All twenty-one competing entries were performed the first evening, with ten advancing to the second evening. The second evening was broadcast on TeleCuraçao.

Competing entries on the Antillean OTI Festival 1978
Song	Artist	Songwriter(s)
From Aruba
"Descubrí tu carta"	Shalene Tromp	Roberto Montiel
"Responso a un amor"	Jossy Brokke jr.	Roberto Montiel
"Que pasa contigo"	Edwin Abath	Roberto Montiel
"País de sueños"	Efrem Benita	Danilo Santinelli
"Amor como el mio"	Siegfried Fradl	Rudy Herrera; Roberto Montiel
"Adiós al miedo"	Rudy Herrera	Rudy Herrera
"Puedo encontrarte"	Sharon Rose	Pepe Gonzales
"Cosas que pasan"	Roy Laclé	Roy Laclé; Rudy Herrera
"Insistiré en quererte"	Triso Steba	Tirso Steba
"Cuando un amor se muere"	Trio Huazteca	Etty Toppenberg
From Bonaire
"El dia en que te enamores"	Nico Meiaan	Richenel Look
From Curaçao
"Antillano soy, latino soy"	Humberto Fernan	Humberto Fernan
"La luz del hogar"	Reignald Vidal	Boeis Hailé
"Ya me acostumbré"	Romeo Heye	Erroll Colina
"Viva la América latina"	Carlos Rosa	Boeis Hailé
"El amor que nos unió"	Dulce Marugg	Erroll Colina
"Nadie sabe"	Luis Santana	Luis Santana
"Ya llegará el dia"	Orlando Rosario	Erroll Colina
From the Dutch Windward Islands
"Escuchen mi voz"	Vernon Jacobs	Vernon Jacobs; Tito Caballero
"Hermano mio"	Hans Peterson	Tito Caballero
"Luna"	Ray A. Thomas	Ray A. Thomas

The overall winner was "Cuando un amor se muere", written by Etty Toppenberg, and performed by Trio Huazteca. One performer per region was also awarded: Trio Huazteca from Aruba, Humberto Fernan from Curaçao, and Vernon Jacobs from the Dutch Windward Islands. Ministers Stanley Rogers and Frank Rozendal presented the awards.

Winner

Result of the second evening of the Antillean OTI Festival 1978
R/O	Song	Artist	Result
	"Puedo encontrarte"	Sharon Rose	
	"Insistiré en quererte"	Triso Steba	
	"Responso a un amor"	Jossy Brokke jr.	
	"Cosas que pasan"	Roy Laclé	
	"País de sueños"	Efrem Benita	
	"Cuando un amor se muere"	Trio Huazteca	1
	"Que pasa contigo"	Edwin Abath	
	"El amor que nos unió"	Dulce Marugg	
	"Antillano soy, latino soy"	Humberto Fernan	
	"Ya me acostumbré"	Romeo Heye	

== At the OTI Festival ==
On 2 December 1978, the OTI Festival was held at the Municipal Theatre in Santiago, Chile, hosted by Televisión Nacional de Chile (TVN), Corporación de Televisión de la Universidad Católica de Chile (UCTV), Corporación de Televisión de la Universidad de Chile (UTV), and Corporación de Televisión de la Universidad Católica de Valparaíso (UCVTV), and broadcast live throughout Ibero-America. Trio Huazteca performed "Cuando un amor se muere" in position 7, with Roberto Montiel conducting the event's orchestra, and placing tenth out of 19 competing entries, with 9 points.

The festival was broadcast on delay on 9 December at 22:00 AST (02:00+1 UTC) on TeleCuraçao.

=== Voting ===
Each participating broadcaster, or group of broadcasters that jointly participated representing a country, assembled a jury who awarded 5–1 points to their five favourite songs in order of preference. ATM instead used its stand-in delegate present at the festival venue to vote for the Netherlands Antilles.

Points awarded to the Netherlands Antilles
Score	Country
5 points	
4 points	United States
3 points	
2 points	Ecuador; Panama
1 point	Peru

Points awarded by the Netherlands Antilles
Score	Country
5 points	Argentina
4 points	Dominican Republic
3 points	Costa Rica
2 points	Puerto Rico
1 point	El Salvador
