= OTI Festival 1990 =

19th OTI Song Festival

Date and venue
- Final: 1 December 1990
- Venue: Circus Maximus; Caesars Palace; Las Vegas, United States

Organization
- Organizer: Organización de Televisión Iberoamericana (OTI)
- Supervisor: Darío de la Peña

Production
- Host broadcaster: Univision
- Director: Arsenio Izquierdo
- Musical director: William Sánchez
- Presenters: Antonio Vodanovic; Alejandra Guzmán; Fernando Allende; María Conchita Alonso; Emmanuel

Participants
- Number of entries: 21
- Returning countries: Netherlands Antilles
- Non-returning countries: Aruba; Bolivia
- Participation map: Participating countries Countries that participated in the past but not in 1990

Vote
- Voting system: Each member of a single jury awards 5–3 points to its three favourite songs in a secret vote
- Winning song: Mexico "Un bolero"

The OTI Festival 1990 (Spanish: Decimonoveno Gran Premio de la Canción Iberoamericana, Portuguese: Décimo Nono Grande Prêmio da Canção Ibero-Americana) was the 19h edition of the OTI Festival, held on 1 December 1990 at the Circus Maximus of the Caesars Palace in Las Vegas, United States, and presented by Antonio Vodanovic, Alejandra Guzmán, Fernando Allende, María Conchita Alonso, and Emmanuel. It was organised by the Organización de Televisión Iberoamericana (OTI) and host broadcaster Univision.

Broadcasters from twenty-one countries participated in the festival. The winner was the song "Un bolero", written by Francisco Curiel and Pedro Alberto Cárdenas, and performed by Carlos Cuevas representing Mexico; with "Dame tu corazón", written by Salvador Cardenal, Reinaldo Ruiz, and Danilo Amador, and performed by Katia Cardenal representing Nicaragua, placing second; and "Duérmete mi amor", written by Paco Ortega and Santiago Gómez Valverde, and performed by Paco Ortega e Isabel Montero representing Spain, placing third.

== Location ==
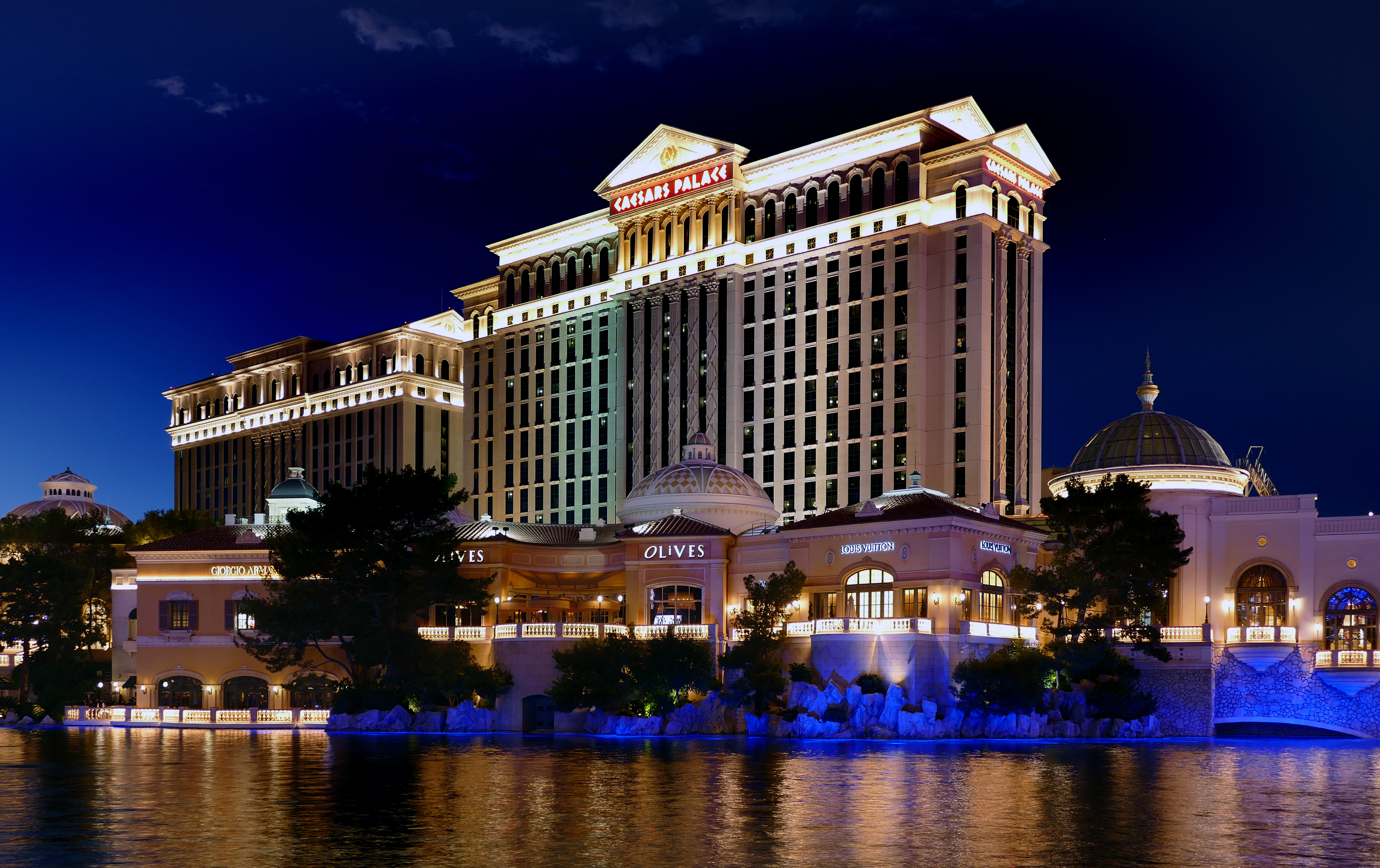
Caesars Palace, Las Vegas – venue of the OTI Festival 1990.

For the second consecutive year, the Organización de Televisión Iberoamericana (OTI) designated Univision as the host broadcaster for the 19th edition of the OTI Festival. The broadcaster staged the event in Las Vegas. The venue selected was the Circus Maximus, which was the main entertainment venue at the Caesars Palace. Opened in 1966, it was in operation until 2000, when it was demolished and replaced by The Colosseum at Caesars Palace.

== Participants ==
Broadcasters from twenty-one countries participated in this edition of the OTI festival. The OTI members, public or private broadcasters from Spain, Portugal, and nineteen Spanish and Portuguese speaking countries of Ibero-America signed up for the festival. From the countries that participated in the previous edition, Aruba and Bolivia did not return, while the Netherlands Antilles returned.

Some of the participating broadcasters, such as those representing Chile, Ecuador, Mexico, and the United States, selected their entries through their regular national televised competitions. Other broadcasters decided to select their entry internally.

Six performing artists had represented the same country previously: Osvaldo Díaz had represented Chile in 1975, Rolando Percy had represented Paraguay in 1978, Mario Echeverría had represented Uruguay in 1983, Rocky Belmonte had represented Peru in 1988, Walter Artiga had represented El Salvador in 1988, and Katia Cardenal had represented Nicaragua in 1989 along Salvador Cardenal.

Participants of the OTI Festival 1990
| Country | Broadcaster(s) | Song | Artist | Songwriter(s) | Language | Conductor |
|---|---|---|---|---|---|---|
| Argentina | | "Quédate chiquilín" | Trío San Javier | Pedro A. Favini; Pablo Ramírez | Spanish | William Sánchez |
| Chile | TVN; UCTV; UTV | "Si no te tuviera a ti" | Osvaldo Díaz | Eduardo Carrasco | Spanish | Miguel Zavaleta |
| Colombia | | "Más que a mi madre" | Daniel Abadía | Álex González | Spanish | Mario Cuesta |
| Costa Rica | Telecentro | "Promesa de amor" | Alejandro Ulate | Ricardo Padilla | Spanish | Álvaro Esquivel |
| Dominican Republic | | "Yo" | Vickiana | José Antonio Rodríguez; Jorge Taveras | Spanish | William Sánchez |
| Ecuador | | "Por amor al arte" | Patricio López | Jimmy Arias | Spanish | Iván Castro |
| El Salvador | TCS | "Todavía el amor perdona" | Walter Artiga | Walter Artiga; Carlos Pineda | Spanish | Alfredo Mojica |
| Guatemala | | "Es por demás" | Annaby | Miguel Amado; Luis Fernando Qujivix | Spanish | Luis Fernando Qujivix |
| Honduras | | "Qué fácil es" | Patricia Ramírez | Emilio Fonseca | Spanish | William Sánchez |
| Mexico | Televisa | "Un bolero" | Carlos Cuevas | Francisco Curiel; Pedro Alberto Cárdenas | Spanish | Pedro Alberto Cárdenas |
| Netherlands Antilles | ATM | "Mujeres" | Nathaly Mardenborough | Shannon R.R. Martha | Spanish | Clark Elisabeth |
| Nicaragua | | "Dame tu corazón" | Katia Cardenal | Salvador Cardenal; Reinaldo Ruiz; Danilo Amador | Spanish | William Sánchez |
| Panama | | "Dos amigas" | Vielka Plummer | Edwin Silvera | Spanish | William Sánchez |
| Paraguay | | "Hacedme soñar con la paz" | Rolando Percy | Rolando Percy | Spanish | William Sánchez |
| Peru | | "Viajero" | Rocky Belmonte | Jorge Tafur | Spanish | Jorge Tafur |
| Portugal | RTP | "Quero acordar" | Dora | Luiz Bernardo Tinoco; José da Ponte | Portuguese | Thilo Krasmann |
| Puerto Rico | Telemundo Puerto Rico | "La mujer que sueño ser" | Ivonne Briel | Lou Briel | Spanish | Ito Serrano |
| Spain | TVE | "Duérmete mi amor" | Paco Ortega e Isabel Montero | Paco Ortega; Santiago Gómez Valverde | Spanish | Eduardo Leiva |
| United States | Univision | "Tu amor es mi adicción" | Daniel Recalde | Daniel Recalde | Spanish | Héctor Garrido |
| Uruguay | Sociedad Televisora Larrañaga | "Sin promesas" | Mario Echeverría | Mario de Azagra | Spanish | Julio Frade |
| Venezuela | | "Sé mujer" | Lilibeth Rodríguez | Lila Morillo | Spanish | Arnoldo Nali |

== Festival overview ==
The festival was held on Saturday 1 December 1990, beginning at 15:00 PST (23:00 UTC). It was presented by Antonio Vodanovic, Alejandra Guzmán, Fernando Allende, María Conchita Alonso, and Emmanuel. The show featured José Luis Rodríguez and Julio Sabala as guest artists. The draw to determine the running order (R/O) was held on 15 October, at the OTI board of directors' annual meeting held in Mexico City.

The winner was the song "Un bolero", written by Francisco Curiel and Pedro Alberto Cárdenas, and performed by Carlos Cuevas representing Mexico; with "Dame tu corazón", written by Salvador Cardenal, Reinaldo Ruiz, and Danilo Amador, and performed by Katia Cardenal representing Nicaragua, placing second; and "Duérmete mi amor", written by Paco Ortega and Santiago Gómez Valverde, and performed by Paco Ortega e Isabel Montero representing Spain, placing third. There were one trophy for each of the first three places. The first prize trophy was delivered by Guillermo Cañedo, president of OTI, and Joaquin Blaya, president of Univision; the second prize trophy by Nicanor González, president of the OTI programs committee, and Alejandra Guzmán; and the third prize trophy by Rosita Perú, vice president of programming at Univision, and Fernando Allende. The first prize was endowed with a monetary amount of US$30,000, the second prize of US$20,000, and the third prize of US$10,000, to be distributed each 50% to the songwriter and 50% to the performer. The festival ended with a reprise of the winning entry.

Winner

Results of the OTI Festival 1990
| R/O | Country | Song | Artist | Place |
|---|---|---|---|---|
| 1 | Chile | "Si no te tuviera a ti" | Osvaldo Díaz | —N/a |
| 2 | Colombia | "Más que a mi madre" | Daniel Abadía | —N/a |
| 3 | United States | "Tu amor es mi adicción" | Daniel Recalde | —N/a |
| 4 | Costa Rica | "Promesa de amor" | Alejandro Ulate | —N/a |
| 5 | Puerto Rico | "La mujer que sueño ser" | Ivonne Briel | —N/a |
| 6 | Spain | "Duérmete mi amor" | Paco Ortega e Isabel Montero | 3 |
| 7 | Nicaragua | "Dame tu corazón" | Katia Cardenal | 2 |
| 8 | Portugal | "Quero acordar" | Dora | —N/a |
| 9 | Argentina | "Quédate chiquilín" | Trío San Javier | —N/a |
| 10 | El Salvador | "Todavía el amor perdona" | Walter Artiga | —N/a |
| 11 | Honduras | "Qué fácil es" | Patricia Ramírez | —N/a |
| 12 | Uruguay | "Sin promesas" | Mario Echeverría | —N/a |
| 13 | Peru | "Viajero" | Rocky Belmonte | —N/a |
| 14 | Paraguay | "Hacedme soñar con la paz" | Rolando Percy | —N/a |
| 5 | Netherlands Antilles | "Mujeres" | Nathaly Mardenborough | —N/a |
| 16 | Ecuador | "Por amor al arte" | Patricio López | —N/a |
| 17 | Panama | "Dos amigas" | Vielka Plummer | —N/a |
| 18 | Mexico | "Un bolero" | Carlos Cuevas | 1 |
| 19 | Dominican Republic | "Yo" | Vickiana | —N/a |
| 20 | Guatemala | "Es por demás" | Annaby | —N/a |
| 21 | Venezuela | "Sé mujer" | Lilibeth Rodríguez | —N/a |

=== Jury ===
Each of the nine members of the single jury awarded 5–3 points to its three favourite songs in a secret vote. Only the top three places were revealed. The voting was supervised by Darío de la Peña, head of special programs at OTI. The members of the jury were:

- Lolita – singer
- Vikki Carr – singer
- Ilan Chester – songwriter
- Myriam Hernández – singer-songwriter
- Johnny Ventura – singer
- Guillermo Dávila – actor
- Ana Gabriel – singer-songwriter, represented Mexico in 1987
- Luis Enrique – singer-songwriter
- Celia Cruz – singer

== Broadcast ==
The festival was broadcast in the 21 participating countries where the corresponding OTI member broadcasters relayed the contest through their networks after receiving it live via satellite. It was reported that it was broadcast in up to 26 countries, including Germany.

Known details on the broadcasts in each country, including the specific broadcasting stations and commentators are shown in the tables below.

Broadcasters and commentators in participating countries
| Country | Broadcaster | Channel(s) | Commentator(s) | Ref. |
|---|---|---|---|---|
| Colombia | Inravisión | Cadena Dos (Note: Delayed broadcast at 21:45 COT (02:45+1 UTC)) | | |
| Costa Rica | Telecentro | Telecentro Canal 6 | | |
| Netherlands Antilles | ATM | TeleCuraçao | | |
| Spain | TVE | TVE 2 | Carlos Herrera | |
| United States | Univision (Note: Delayed broadcast later that day by all Univision affiliates, each in their own time zone.) | | | |
