= Paco Ortega =

Spanish musician, composer, producer & businessman

- Born: Antonino Martínez Ortega; October 28, 1957 (age 68); Úbeda, Jaén, Spain
- Genres: Pop; flamenco
- Occupations: Singer; musician; composer; producer; businessman

Antonino Martínez Ortega (Úbeda, Jaén, October 28, 1957), more commonly known as Paco Ortega, is a Spanish singer, composer, producer, and businessman specialized in pop and flamenco.

He relaunched the Musigrama recording studio, a temple of music recording in Spain. He created the record company 'El Pescador de Estrellas', the record label 'Libertad 8' for the release of new singer-songwriters, the label “Discos Musigrama” and the label "Dulcimer Songs" for medium-level products. He is the manager of the production company 'Dulcimer Songs' and co-founder of 'Flamenco 2000'. And he is the founder, together with Jesús Bola and Alejandro Sanz, of the 'F Home Studio' family of guitars.

He formed with Isabel Montero the duo Paco Ortega e Isabel Montero and they recorded three albums. The duo represented Spain in the OTI Festival 1990 placing third with the song "Duérmete mi amor" written by him and Santiago Gómez Valverde.
