= Curaçao at the FIFA World Cup =

International football delegation

Curaçao appeared in the FIFA World Cup for the first time in 2026. On 18 November 2025, they topped their qualifying group and qualified for the 2026 FIFA World Cup, becoming the smallest nation by both population and area to qualify for the tournament.

== Background ==
Curaçao is a constituent country of the Kingdom of the Netherlands with a population of about 156,000. Its national team is the sporting successor to the Netherlands Antilles national football team, whose records and FIFA ranking it inherited before adopting the Curaçao name in 2011. The team reached the World Cup largely through players of Curaçaoan descent who were born and developed in the Netherlands, an approach that broadened under former Netherlands striker Patrick Kluivert from 2015. Of the 26 players named for the 2026 finals, 25 were born in the Netherlands.

== Overall record ==
FIFA World Cup record									Qualification record					
Year	Round	Position	Pld	W	D*	L	GF	GA	Pld	W	D	L	GF	GA
as (Colony of Curaçao and Dependencies) Territory of Curaçao									as (Colony of Curaçao and Dependencies) Territory of Curaçao					
(Uruguay) 1930	Not a FIFA member								Not a FIFA member					
(Italy) 1934	Did not enter								Did not enter					
(France) 1938	Did not enter								Did not enter					
(Brazil) 1950	Did not enter								Did not enter					
(Switzerland) 1954	Did not enter								Did not enter					
(Sweden) 1958	Did not qualify								3	1	0	2	4	7
as Netherlands Antilles									as Netherlands Antilles					
(Chile) 1962	Did not qualify								6	2	2	2	4	14
(England) 1966	Did not qualify								4	1	2	1	2	3
(Mexico) 1970	Did not qualify								4	1	0	3	3	9
(Germany) 1974	Did not qualify								5	0	2	3	4	19
(Argentina) 1978	Did not qualify								2	0	0	2	1	9
(Spain) 1982	Did not qualify								4	0	3	1	1	2
(Mexico) 1986	Did not qualify								2	0	1	1	0	4
(Italy) 1990	Did not qualify								4	2	0	2	4	7
(United States) 1994	Did not qualify								2	0	1	1	1	4
(France) 1998	Did not qualify								2	0	1	1	1	2
(South Korea) (Japan) 2002	Did not qualify								2	0	1	1	1	6
(Germany) 2006	Did not qualify								4	1	0	3	4	8
(South Africa) 2010	Did not qualify								4	2	1	1	3	1
as Curaçao									as Curaçao					
(Brazil) 2014	Did not qualify								6	2	1	3	15	15
(Russia) 2018	Did not qualify								6	1	3	2	5	6
(Qatar) 2022	Did not qualify								6	3	2	1	16	3
(Canada) (Mexico) (United States) 2026	Group stage	4th	3	0	1	2	1	9	10	7	3	0	28	5
(Morocco) (Portugal) (Spain) 2030	To be determined								To be determined					
(Saudi Arabia) 2034	To be determined								To be determined					
Total	Groupstage	1/23	3	0	1	2	1	9	76	23	23	30	94	125

*Draws include knockout matches decided via penalty shoot-out.

== 2026 FIFA World Cup ==
Curaçao were drawn in Group E alongside Germany, Ecuador and Ivory Coast, with their matches staged in Houston, Kansas City and Philadelphia. At the age of 78, Advocaat became the oldest manager to take charge of a match at a World Cup when the team opened against Germany.

=== Group stage ===
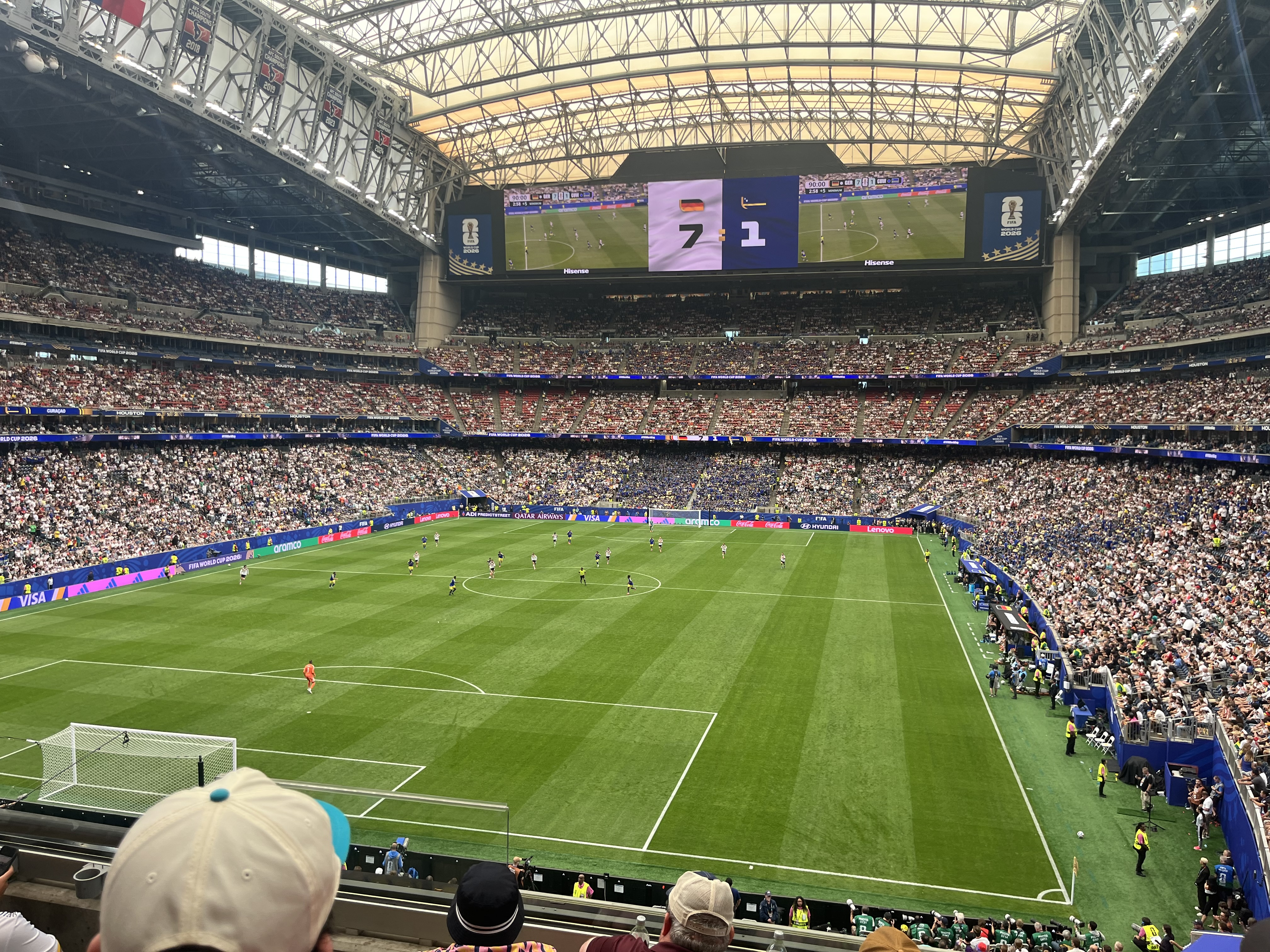
Curaçao's debut match against Germany

Pos	Team	Pld	W	D	L	GF	GA	GD	Pts	Qualification
1	Germany	3	2	0	1	10	4	+6	6 (Note: Head-to-head result: Germany 2–1 Ivory Coast.)	Advance to knockout stage
2	Ivory Coast	3	2	0	1	4	2	+2	6	Advance to knockout stage
3	Ecuador	3	1	1	1	2	2	0	4	Advance to knockout stage
4	Curaçao	3	0	1	2	1	9	−8	1	

Source: FIFA
Notes:
June 14, 2026
12:00 p.m. UTC−5

Germany	7–1	Curaçao
Nmecha 6'; Schlotterbeck 38'; Havertz 45+5' (pen.), 88'; Musiala 47'; Brown 68'; Undav 78'	(Note: "Germany vs Curaçao | First Stage | FIFA World Cup 2026". FIFA. Retrieved June 14, 2026.; "Match Report – Group E – Germany v. Curaçao". FIFA. June 14, 2026. Retrieved June 14, 2026.; "Post match summary report – Group E – Germany v. Curaçao". FIFA. June 15, 2026. Retrieved June 25, 2026.)	Comenencia 21'

NRG Stadium, Houston
Attendance: 68,021
Referee: Jalal Jayed (Morocco)

June 20, 2026
7:00 p.m. UTC−5

Ecuador	0–0	Curaçao
	(Note: "Ecuador vs Curaçao | First Stage | FIFA World Cup 2026". FIFA. Retrieved June 21, 2026.; "Match Report – Group E – Ecuador v. Curaçao". FIFA. June 21, 2026. Retrieved June 21, 2026.; "Post match summary report – Group E – Ecuador v. Curaçao". FIFA. June 21, 2026. Retrieved June 21, 2026.)

Arrowhead Stadium, Kansas City
Attendance: 68,598
Referee: Ma Ning (China)

June 25, 2026
4:00 p.m. UTC−4

Curaçao	0–2	Ivory Coast
	(Note: "Curaçao vs Côte d'Ivoire | First Stage | FIFA World Cup 2026". FIFA. Retrieved June 25, 2026.; "Match Report – Group E – Curaçao v. Côte d'Ivoire". FIFA. June 25, 2026. Retrieved June 25, 2026.; "Post match summary report – Group E – Curaçao v. Côte d'Ivoire". FIFA. June 25, 2026. Retrieved June 27, 2026.)	Pépé 7', 64'

Lincoln Financial Field, Philadelphia
Attendance: 68,324
Referee: Glenn Nyberg (Sweden)

== Goalscorers ==
On 14 June 2026, Livano Comenencia scored the first-ever FIFA World Cup goal in the history of Curaçao, netting in the 21st minute of their opening match against Germany in Houston.

Player	Goals	2026
Livano Comenencia	1	1
Total	1	1

== Head-to-head record ==
Opponent	Pld	W	D	L	GF	GA	GD	Win %	Ref.
Ecuador	1	0	1	0	0	0	+0	0.00	
Germany	1	0	0	1	1	7	−6	0.00	
Ivory Coast	1	0	0	1	0	2	−2	0.00	
Total	3	0	1	2	1	9	−8	0.00	—

== See also ==
- North, Central American and Caribbean nations at the FIFA World Cup
- Curaçao at the CONCACAF Gold Cup
