= Chile in the OTI Festival 1989 =

- OTI Festival 1989
- Participating broadcasters: Televisión Nacional de Chile (TVN); Corporación de Televisión de la Universidad Católica de Chile (UCTV); Corporación de Televisión de la Universidad de Chile (UTV)
- Country: Chile
- Selection process: National final
- Selection date: 7 October 1989

Competing entry
- Song: "La movida"
- Artist: Catalina Telias
- Songwriter: Scottie Scott

Placement
- Final result: Finalist

Participation chronology
◄1988 •	1989	• 1990►

Chile was represented at the OTI Festival 1989 with the song "La movida", written by Scottie Scott, and performed by Catalina Telias. The Chilean participating broadcasters, Televisión Nacional de Chile (TVN), Corporación de Televisión de la Universidad Católica de Chile (UCTV), and Corporación de Televisión de la Universidad de Chile (UTV), jointly selected their entry through a televised national final. The song, that was performed in position 10, was not among the top-three places revealed.

== National stage ==
Televisión Nacional de Chile (TVN), Corporación de Televisión de la Universidad Católica de Chile (UCTV), and Corporación de Televisión de la Universidad de Chile (UTV), held a national final jointly to select their entry for the 18th edition of the OTI Festival, which was staged by TVN. Eight songs were shortlisted for the televised final.

Competing entries on the national final – Chile 1989
Song	Artist	Songwriter(s)
"Amigo, tú sabes bien"	Eliza	Santiago Retti
"Donde estarás"	Soraya Jacob	Ignacio Loyola
"Donde vas para amarte"	Óscar Andrade	Óscar Andrade
"La movida"	Catalina Telias	Scottie Scott
"No quiero perderme"	Eduardo Valenzuela and Tatiana Bustos	Eduardo Valenzuela; Tatiana Bustos
"Nos falta locura"	María Inés Naveillán	Luis "Poncho" Venegas
"Rememorándum"	Sebastián	Francisco Aranda; Alex Murray
"Viento del Caribe"	José Luis Arce	Juan Luis Fissore

=== National final ===
The national final was held on Saturday 7 October 1989, beginning at 21:30 CLT (01:30+1 UTC), and was presented by Pamela Hodar and Juan Guillermo Vivado. The musical director was Horacio Saavedra who conducted the TVN orchestra and choir when required. The show featured a guest performance by Alejandro Lerner. It was broadcast on TVN's Canal 7 and UTV's Canal 11.

The jury consisted of five members: Buddy Richard, José Alfredo Fuentes, Gloria Benavides, Karin Yanine and Hernaní Banda. The running order of the songs was determined by a draw on 2 October.

The winner was "La movida", written by Scottie Scott, and performed by Catalina Telias; with "Viento del Caribe", written by Juan Luis Fissore, and performed by José Luis Arce, placing second.

Winner

Result of the national final – Chile 1989
R/O	Song	Artist	Result
1	"Nos falta locura"	María Inés Naveillán	
2	"La movida"	Catalina Telias	1 (Note: "La movida" and "Viento del Caribe" finished with the same number of votes, with "La movida" winning the tie breaking vote.)
3	"Dónde estarás"	Soraya Jacob	
4	"Amigo, tú sabes bien"	Eliza	
5	"Viento del Caribe"	José Luis Arce	2
6	"Rememorándum"	Sebastián	
7	"No quiero perderme"	Eduardo Valenzuela and Tatiana Bustos	
8	"Donde vas para amarte"	Óscar Andrade	

== At the OTI Festival ==
On 18 November 1989, the OTI Festival was held at the theater of the James L. Knight Center in Miami, United States, hosted by Univision, and broadcast live throughout Ibero-America. Catalina Telias performed "La movida" in position 10, with Toly Ramírez conducting the event's orchestra. The song was not among the top-three places revealed.

The festival was broadcast on TVN's Canal 7 and UTV's Canal 11 on delay at 21:30 CLST (00:30+1 UTC).
