= Vickiana =

Dominican singer and vedette

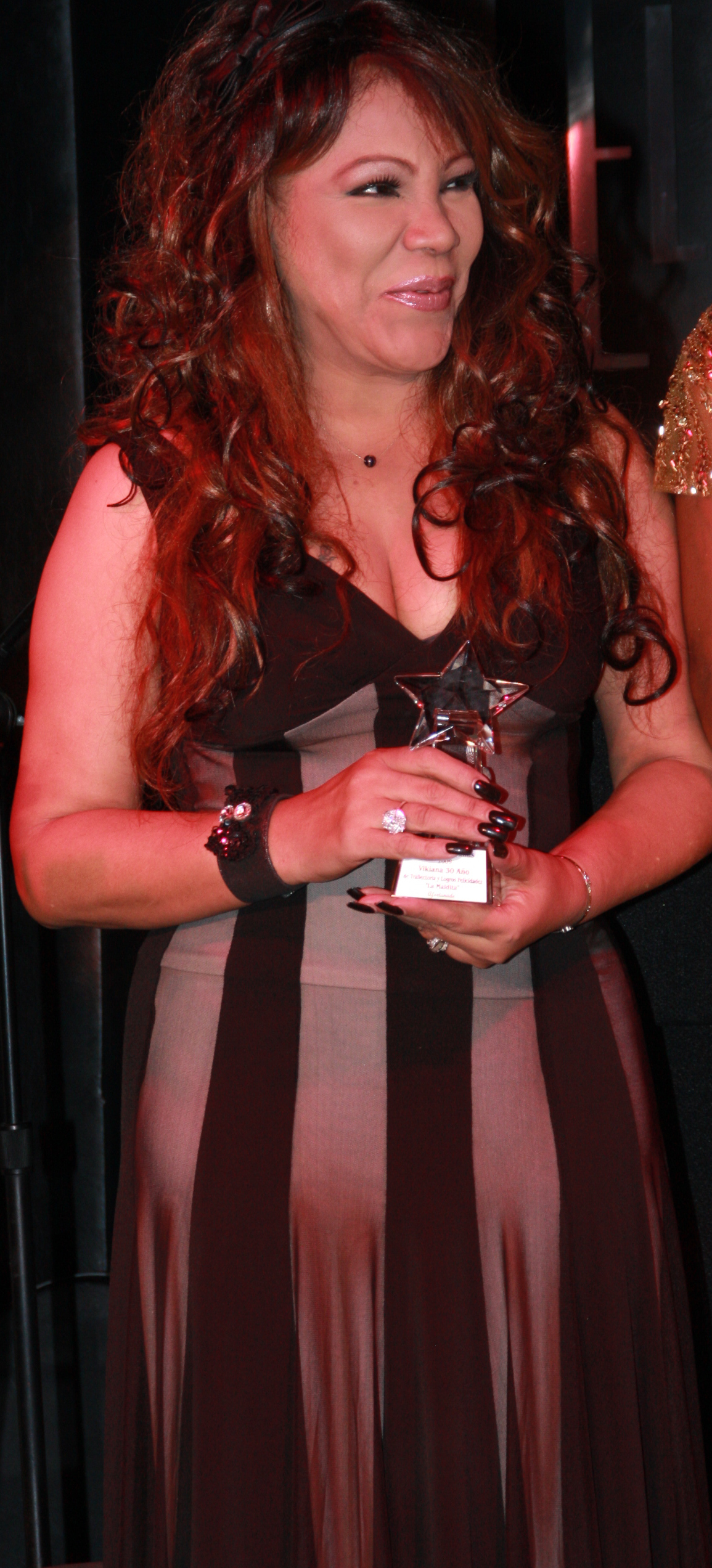
Vikiana (2009)

Ana Victoria García Pérez (born 15 July 1958, in Santiago, Dominican Republic), better known as Vickiana, is a singer, vedette, and television presenter. The producer and host of the television program Vickiana, lo prohibido became very popular in music from 1980. Since 1981, Vickiana has been the recipient of many awards. She represented the Dominican Republic in the OTI Festival 1990 with the song "Yo".

== Personal life ==
Vickiana is considered an icon of the Dominican Gay Community. Her son, Luis Gilberto, launched an artistic career in 2022. A diabetic, Vickiana suffered a myocardial infarction in 1999, a diabetic coma in 2011, and a heart attack in 2019.

== Discography ==
1. Jardin Prohibido, 1981
2. Te Invito,1983
3. Derriteme, 1985
4. Vickiana I, 1990
5. Mas que Amor, 1991
6. Vickiana II, 1994
7. Amargada, 1995
8. Infiel, 1997
9. En calor, 2000
10. Disco de Oro de Vickiana
