= Chile in the OTI Festival 1990 =

- OTI Festival 1990
- Participating broadcasters: Televisión Nacional de Chile (TVN); Corporación de Televisión de la Universidad Católica de Chile (UCTV); Corporación de Televisión de la Universidad de Chile (UTV)
- Country: Chile
- Selection process: National final
- Selection date: 3 November 1990

Competing entry
- Song: "Si no te tuviera a ti"
- Artist: Osvaldo Díaz
- Songwriter: Eduardo Carrasco

Placement
- Final result: Finalist

Participation chronology
◄1989 •	1990	• 1991►

Chile was represented at the OTI Festival 1990 with the song "Si no te tuviera a ti", written by Eduardo Carrasco, and performed by Osvaldo Díaz. The Chilean participating broadcasters, Televisión Nacional de Chile (TVN), Corporación de Televisión de la Universidad Católica de Chile (UCTV), and Corporación de Televisión de la Universidad de Chile (UTV), jointly selected their entry through a national televised final. Díaz had represented Chile in 1975.

== National stage ==
Televisión Nacional de Chile (TVN), Corporación de Televisión de la Universidad Católica de Chile (UCTV), and Corporación de Televisión de la Universidad de Chile (UTV), held a national competition jointly to select their entry for the 19th edition of the OTI Festival. This edition of the national final featured eight songs.

Competing entries on the national final – Chile 1990 (Note: Incomplete list of the eight competing entries.)
Song	Artist	Songwriter(s)
"Si no te tuviera a ti"	Osvaldo Díaz	Eduardo Carrasco
"Como yo"	Alejandro de Rosas	Andrés Ossandón
"Enamorado"	Síndrome	Síndrome
"Cuando sea niño"	Osvaldo Leiva	Osvaldo Leiva

=== National final ===
The national final was held on 3 November 1990 at Teatro Teletón, and was presented by Julio Videla and Katherine Salosny. The show featured a guest performance by Zalo Reyes. It was broadcast on TVN's Canal 7, UCTV's Canal 13, and UTV's Canal 11.

The winner was "Si no te tuviera a ti", written by Eduardo Carrasco, and performed by Osvaldo Díaz; with "Como yo", written by Andrés Ossandón, and performed by Alejandro de Rosas, placing second. The first prize was endowed with a monetary amount of CLP$400,000, the second prize of CLP$250,000, and the third prize of CLP$200,000. The festival ended with a reprise of the winning entry.

Winner

Result of the national final – Chile 1990
R/O	Song	Artist	Result
	"Si no te tuviera a ti"	Osvaldo Díaz	1
	"Como yo"	Alejandro de Rosas	2
	"Enamorado"	Síndrome	
	"Cuando sea niño"	Osvaldo Leiva	

== At the OTI Festival ==
On 1 December 1990, the OTI Festival was held at the Circus Maximus of the Caesars Palace in Las Vegas, hosted by Univision, and broadcast live throughout Ibero-America. Osvaldo Díaz performed "Si no te tuviera a ti" in position 1, with Miguel Zavaleta conducting the event's orchestra. The song was not among the top-three places revealed at the end.
