= United States in the OTI Festival 1979 =

- OTI Festival 1979
- Participating broadcaster: Spanish International Network (SIN)
- Country: United States
- Selection process: National OTI–SIN Festival
- Selection date: 9 November 1979

Competing entry
- Song: "Y una esperanza más"
- Artist: Mario Alberto Milar
- Songwriter: Mario Alberto Milar

Placement
- Final result: 9th, 16 points

Participation chronology
◄1978 •	1979	• 1980►

The United States was represented at the OTI Festival 1979 with the song "Y una esperanza más", written and performed by Mario Alberto Milar. The participating broadcaster representing the country, the Spanish International Network (SIN), selected its entry through a national televised competition. The song, that was performed in position 20, placed ninth out of 21 competing entries, tying with the song from the Netherlands Antilles with 16 points.

== National stage ==
The Spanish International Network (SIN) held a national televised competition to select its entry for the 8th edition of the OTI Festival. This was the second edition of the National OTI–SIN Festival. In the final, each song represented a SIN affiliate, each of which had selected its entry through a local pre-selection.

=== Los Angeles pre-selection ===
On Sunday 12 August 1979, KMEX-TV held a televised pre-selection at its studios in Los Angeles. This first edition of the Los Angeles Local OTI Festival featured twelve songs. It was broadcast on Channel 34.

The jury was composed of Claudio Román, Orlando López, Lupita Morán, Catarina Schindler, and Eduardo Quezada.

The winner, and therefore qualified for the national final, was "Sólo sueños", written and performed by Yari Moré.

Qualifier

Result of the Local OTI Festival – Los Angeles 1979
R/O	Song	Artist	Songwriter(s)	Points	Result
1	"Canto a la vida"	Juan M. de la Cruz		37	4
2	"Sólo sueños"	Yari Moré	Yari Moré	44	Qualified
3	"Es hora de partir"	Carlos Skewes		32	8
4	"El hoy te pertenece"	Olinsser		31	9
5	"Nací para ti"	Juan Guillermo Aguirre "Santiago"		40	2
6	"Caminador"	Olinsser		39	3
7	"Soledades"	Carlos Skewes		29	11
8	"Te quiero demasiado"	Gayle Caldwell		31	9
9	"Hoy es el primer día"	Loy García		33	6
10	"Sentimiento tristeza"			29	11
11	"Que viva la vida"			34	5
12	"Canto el canto de la vida"			33	6

Detailed Vote of the Local OTI Festival – Los Angeles 1979
R/O	Song	Claudio Román	Orlando López	Lupita Morán	Catarina Schindler	Eduardo Quezada	Total
1	"Canto a la vida"	6	6	10	7	8	37
2	"Sólo sueños"	10	10	8	9	7	44
3	"Es hora de partir"	6	5	6	6	9	32
4	"El hoy te pertenece"	6	7	5	5	8	31
5	"Nací para ti"	9	8	7	9	7	40
6	"Caminador"	7	8	5	10	9	39
7	"Soledades"	7	5	4	6	7	29
8	"Te quiero demasiado"	7	5	7	4	8	31
9	"Hoy es el primer día"	5	7	7	7	7	33
10	"Sentimiento tristeza"	4	4	2	9	10	29
11	"Que viva la vida"	5	6	6	9	8	34
12	"Canto el canto de la vida"	6	6	8	8	5	33

=== Central California pre-selection ===
On Sunday 12 August 1979, KFTV also held a televised pre-selection at the KMEX-TV studios in Los Angeles. This second edition of the Central California Local OTI Festival featured three songs. It was held on the same show as the Los Angeles pre-selection, and used the same jury. It was broadcast live on Channel 21.

The winner, and therefore qualified for the national final, was "Tú, yo y el amor", performed by Antonio López.

Result of the Local OTI Festival – Central California 1979
R/O	Song	Artist	Songwriter(s)	Points	Result
1	"Esposa"	Jesús Leiva		26	3
2	"Con hilo azul"	Miguel Hernández		29	2
3	"Tú, yo y el amor"	Antonio López		47	Qualified

Detailed Vote of the Local OTI Festival – Central California 1979
R/O	Song	Claudio Román	Orlando López	Lupita Morán	Catarina Schindler	Eduardo Quezada	Total
1	"Esposa"	6	5	3	4	8	26
2	"Con hilo azul"	5	6	3	8	7	29
3	"Tú, yo y el amor"	10	10	9	9	9	47

=== Final ===
The final was held on Friday 9 November 1979 in San Antonio, featuring nine songs. It was broadcast live on all SIN affiliates. The winner was "Y una esperanza más", written and performed by Mario Alberto Milar.

Winner

Result of the final of the National OTI–SIN Festival 1979 (Note: Incomplete list of the competing entries.)
R/O	Song	Artist	Affiliate	Result
	"Y una esperanza más"	Mario Alberto Milar		1
	"Sólo sueños"	Yari Moré	KMEX-TV–Los Angeles	
	"Tú, yo y el amor"	Antonio López	KFTV–Fresno	

== At the OTI Festival ==
On 8 December 1979, the OTI Festival was held at the Theatre of the Military Academy in Caracas, Venezuela, hosted by Radio Caracas Televisión (RCTV), Venevisión, Televisora Nacional (TVN), and Venezolana de Televisión (VTV), and broadcast live throughout Ibero-America. Mario Alberto Milar performed "Y una esperanza más" in position 20, placing ninth out of 21 competing entries, tying with the song from the Netherlands Antilles with 16 points.

=== Voting ===
Each participating broadcaster, or group of broadcasters that jointly participated representing a country, assembled a jury who awarded 5–1 points to their five favourite songs in order of preference.

Points awarded to the United States
Score	Country
5 points	Costa Rica
4 points	El Salvador
3 points	Netherlands Antilles
2 points	Dominican Republic
1 point	Honduras; Paraguay

Points awarded by the United States
Score	Country
5 points	Panama
4 points	Brazil
3 points	Argentina
2 points	Puerto Rico
1 point	Honduras
