= Dominican Republic in the OTI Festival =

- OTI Festival
- Participating broadcaster: Color Visión; Tele Antillas; Telesistema Dominicano

Participation summary
- Appearances: 26
- First appearance: 1972
- Last appearance: 2000
- Highest placement: 2nd in 1977, 1983
- Participation history: 1972; 1973; 1974; 1975; 1976; 1977; 1978; 1979; 1980; 1981; 1982; 1983; 1984; 1985; 1986; 1987; 1988; 1989; 1990; 1991; 1992; 1993; 1994; 1995; 1996; 1997; 1998; 2000

The participation of the Dominican Republic in the OTI Festival began at the first OTI Festival in 1972. The Dominican participating broadcasters were Color Visión, Tele Antillas, and Telesistema Dominicano, which were members of the Organización de Televisión Iberoamericana (OTI). They participated in twenty-six of the twenty-eight editions, only missing the 1976 and 1981 festivals. Its best placing was second, achieved in 1977 and 1983.

== History ==
The Dominican Republic never managed to get a victory in the OTI Festival, but had a successful participation during the most of its history and ended several times in the top 10 places of the classification.

Fernando Casado was the first Dominican representative in the contest and placed seventh with his song "Siempre habrá en la luna una sonrisa". In 1973, it recorded one of its greatest successes in the contest with Niní Cáffaro and his song "El juicio final", which placed third with 9 points. In 1977, Fernando Casado was selected again to represent the Dominican Republic in the contest with the song "Al nacer cada enero" which placed second and became a hit in the island.

After some other successful participations, Telesistema Dominicano selected the singer Taty Salas with her ballad "Olvidar, Olvidar" which achieved second place again. Salas was selected again in 1988, and although she didn't repeat the success of her previous entry, she placed third with the song "De tu boca".

In 1989, Telesistema Dominicano, determined to record a Dominican victory once for all, contacted the prominent singer Juan Luis Guerra, who composed the power ballad "Te ofrezco" which was sung by Maridalia Hernández. Although the song placed third and didn't win, this entry was widely acclaimed both by the jury and by the audience to the point that today, it's considered to be one of the best entries in the history of the OTI Festival.

The following Dominican entries were not as successful as before but the country managed to place respectably in the last years of the contest.

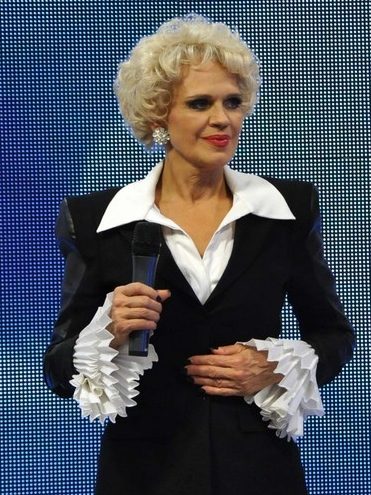
Charytín Goyco got fifth place in 1974

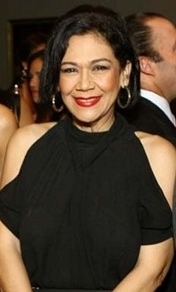
Maridalia Hernández got third place in 1989

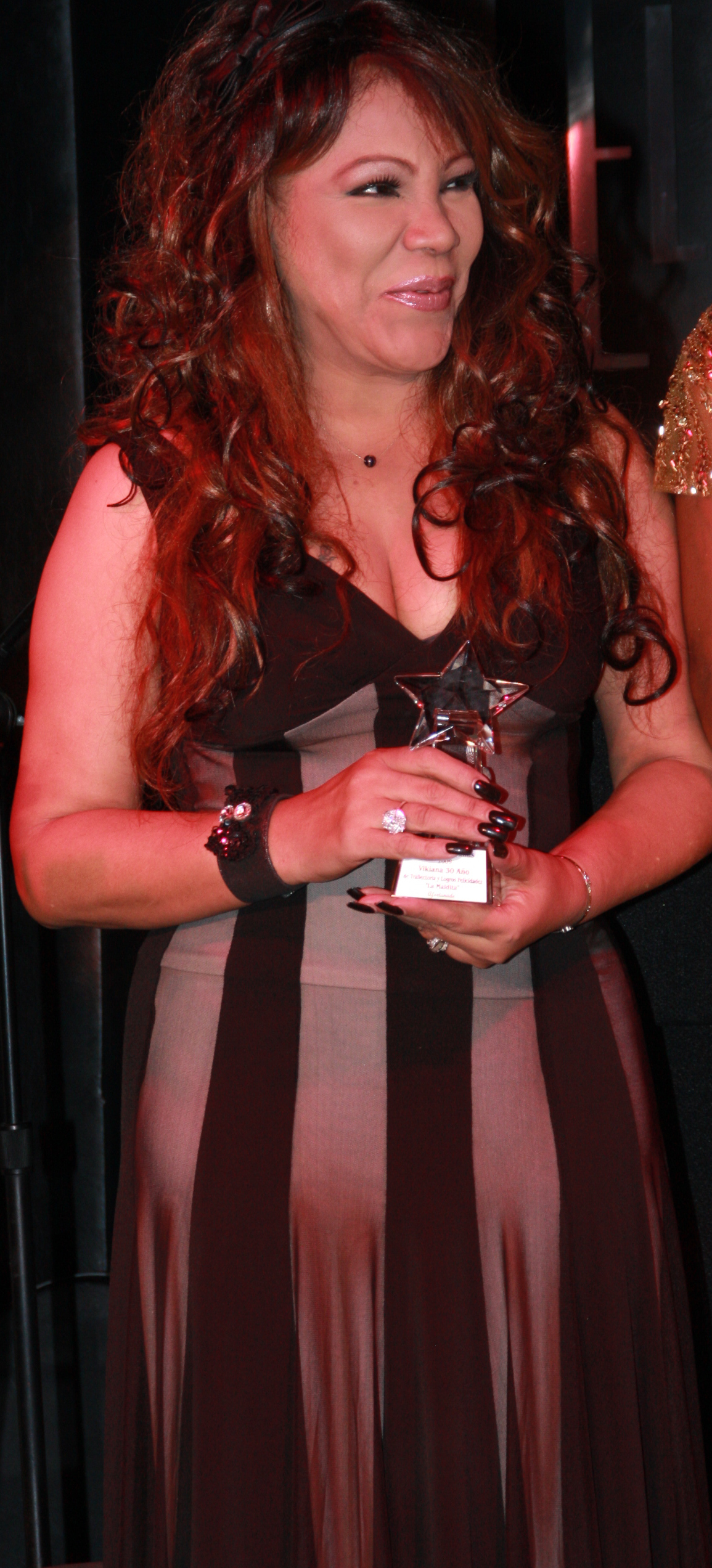
Vickiana participated in 1990

== Participation overview ==
Table key
2	Second place
3	Third place
SF	Semi-finalist
F	Finalist
◇	Contest cancelled

Year	Song	Artist	Songwriter(s)	Conductor	Place	Points
1972	"Siempre habrá en la luna una sonrisa"	Fernando Casado	Meche Díez	Augusto Algueró	7	4
1973	"El juicio final"	Niní Cáffaro	Rafael Solano	Jorge Taveras	3	9
1974	"Alexandra"	Charytín Goyco	Charytín Goyco	Jorge Taveras	5	7
1975	"La vida está intranquila"	Luchi Vicioso	Jorge Taveras; Yaqui Núñez del Risco	Jorge Taveras	14	2
1976	Did not participate					
1977	"Al nacer cada enero"	Fernando Casado	Cheo Zorrilla	Rafael Ibarbia	2	8
1978	"Blanca paloma"	Hilda Saldaña	Leonor Porcella de Brea	Bienvenido Bustamante	8	12
1979	"Mi mundo"	Omar Franco	Adriano Rodríguez	Danny León	14	10
1980	"Canción de un hombre simple"	Fausto Rey	Jorge Taveras; Yaqui Núñez del Risco	Jorge Taveras	6	25
1981	Did not participate					
1982	"Por tanto amor"	Rhina Ramírez	Leonor Porcella de Brea	Manuel Tejada	7	20
1983	"Olvidar, olvidar"	Taty Salas	Cheo Zorrilla	Manuel Tejada	2	—N/a
1984	"La vida es alegría"	Sonia Alfonso	Alex Mancilla	Bertico Sosa	—N/a	
1985	"Con las alas rotas"	Gina D'Alessandro	Cheo Zorrilla	Bertico Sosa	—N/a	
1986	"Sol de la noche"	Cheo Zorrilla	Cheo Zorrilla	Horacio Saavedra	—N/a	
1987	"Esto tiene que cambiar"	Julio Sabala	Julio Sabala; Chema Purón	José Juan Almela	—N/a	
1988	"De tu boca"	Taty Salas	Juan Luis Guerra	Manuel Tejada	3	16
1989	"Te ofrezco"	Maridalia Hernández	Juan Luis Guerra	Manuel Tejeda	3	—N/a
1990	"Yo"	Vickiana	José Antonio Rodríguez; Jorge Taveras	William Sánchez	—N/a	
1991	"Cuando el amor se va"	Jackeline Estévez	Anthony Ríos	Chucho Ferrer	SF	—N/a
1992	"A su tiempo"	Cheo Zorrilla	Cheo Zorrilla; Manuel Tejada		—N/a	
1993	"Sigue"	Grupo Triada	Mario Díaz; Manuel Tejada	Manuel Tejada	—N/a	
1994	"Con agua de sal"	Miriam Cruz	Manuel Jiménez		4	10
1995	"Un solar en la luna"	Manuel Jiménez	Manuel Jiménez	Manuel Tejada	—N/a	
1996	"Una historia más"	Frank Ceara	Manuel Tejada	Manuel Tejada	—N/a	
1997	"El amor que tuve"	Audrey Campos	Manuel Jiménez	Manuel Tejada	F	—N/a
1998	"Me levanto"	Claudine Bono	Manuel Jiménez	Manuel Tejada	F	—N/a
1999	Contest cancelled ◇					
2000	"¿Qué nos pasa?"	Rando Camasta	Rando Camasta	Nando Hernández	F	—N/a
