= Maridalia Hernández =

Dominican singer (born 1959)

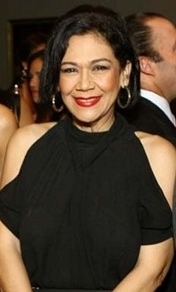

Background information
- Born: 19 August 1959 (age 67); Santiago de los Caballeros, Dominican Republic
- Genres: Merengue, bachata, bolero
- Occupations: Singer, actress
- Years active: 1981–present

Maridalia Hernández (born 19 August 1959) is a Dominican singer.

== Early life and education ==
Maridalia Hernández was born in Santiago de los Caballeros, Dominican Republic, in 1959. She was fully trained as a lyrical singer, pianist, cellist and music teacher.

== Career ==
She made her live debut as a pop singer in 1981, while participating in a musical called Sonido Para Una Imagen (Sound for an Image). Later, she was cast to raving reviews as Maria Magdalena in the Spanish version of Jesus Christ Superstar. In 1983, Hernández teamed up with Juan Luis Guerra to assemble the successful bachata-merengue group 440. Her vocal quality identified the sound of the first years of the well known quartet.

In 1986, she won the Viña del Mar International Song Festival with "Para Quererte," composed by Manuel Tejada and José Antonio Rodríguez.

She appeared with pianist Michel Camilo at the Festival de Jazz de Madrid in 1988, and she placed third in the OTI Festival 1989 with the song "Te ofrezco" representing the Dominican Republic. In 1992, she has also been awarded with the prizes "Aplauso 92" in Miami, and ACE Award 1994, in New York City. In addition to her work with Camilo, she appeared with Cuban Jazz pianist, Gonzalo Rubalcaba on the album "Antiguo" for Blue Note Records.

She currently lives in Santo Domingo and has one daughter, Camila.

== Discography ==
- Te Ofrezco (1992)
- Amorosa (1993)
- Libre (2009)
