= Osvaldo Díaz (singer) =

Chilean singer (1949–2026)

- Born: 30 September 1949; Santiago, Chile
- Died: 16 January 2026 (aged 76); Santiago, Chile
- Occupation: Singer

Osvaldo Díaz (30 September 1949 – 16 January 2026) was a Chilean singer, part of the nueva ola and canto nuevo movements. He represented Chile in the OTI Festival 1975 with "Las puertas del mundo", written by Luis "Poncho" Venegas; and in the OTI Festival 1990 with "Si no te tuviera a ti", written by Eduardo Carrasco, after winning the national final. He died at the age of 76.
