= Curaçao at the CONCACAF Gold Cup =

Football results

The CONCACAF Gold Cup is North America's major tournament in senior men's football and determines the continental champion. Until 1989, the tournament was known as CONCACAF Championship. It is currently held every two years. From 1996 to 2005, nations from other confederations have regularly joined the tournament as invitees. In earlier editions, the continental championship was held in different countries, but since the inception of the Gold Cup in 1991, the United States are constant hosts or co-hosts.

From 1973 to 1989, the tournament doubled as the confederation's World Cup qualification. CONCACAF's representative team at the FIFA Confederations Cup was decided by a play-off between the winners of the last two tournament editions in 2015 via the CONCACAF Cup, but was then discontinued along with the Confederations Cup.

Since the inaugural tournament in 1963, the Gold Cup was held 28 times and has been won by seven different nations, most often by Mexico (13 titles).

Curaçao have qualified for the continental championship six times. As the Netherlands Antilles, the team scored good results in the 1960s, including two third-place finishes. Since the dissolution of the Netherlands Antilles in 2010, Curaçao have qualified twice. In 2017, they lost all three group matches. In 2019 however, they reached the knockout stage after earning a 1–0 victory over Honduras and drawing 1–1 against Jamaica with a stunning injury time equalizer by Juriën Gaari. They were then eliminated after losing 1–0 to the United States in the quarter-finals.

Of the other CONCACAF members that used to be part of the Netherlands Antilles (Aruba, Bonaire and Sint Maarten), none have qualified for a Gold Cup as of 2025.

== Overall record ==
| CONCACAF Championship & Gold Cup record | | | | | | | | | | Qualification record | | | | | |
| Year | Round | Position | Pld | W | D | L | GF | GA | Squad | Pld | W | D | L | GF | GA |
| as Netherlands Antilles | | | | | | | | | | as Netherlands Antilles | | | | | |
|---|---|---|---|---|---|---|---|---|---|---|---|---|---|---|---|
| (El Salvador) 1963 | Third place | 3rd | 8 | 5 | 0 | 3 | 14 | 9 | Squad | 2 | 2 | 0 | 0 | 4 | 1 |
| (Guatemala) 1965 | Fifth place | 5th | 5 | 0 | 2 | 3 | 4 | 16 | Squad | Qualified automatically | | | | | |
| (Honduras) 1967 | Did not qualify | | | | | | | | | 4 | 0 | 2 | 2 | 4 | 6 |
| (Costa Rica) 1969 | Third place | 3rd | 5 | 2 | 1 | 2 | 9 | 12 | Squad | Qualified automatically | | | | | |
| (Trinidad and Tobago) 1971 | Did not enter | | | | | | | | | Did not enter | | | | | |
| (Haiti) 1973 | Sixth place | 6th | 5 | 0 | 2 | 3 | 4 | 19 | Squad | Qualified automatically | | | | | |
| (Mexico) 1977 | Did not qualify | | | | | | | | | 2 | 0 | 0 | 2 | 1 | 9 |
| (Honduras) 1981 | Did not qualify | | | | | | | | | 4 | 0 | 3 | 1 | 1 | 2 |
| 1985 | Did not qualify | | | | | | | | | 2 | 0 | 1 | 1 | 0 | 4 |
| 1989 | Did not qualify | | | | | | | | | 4 | 2 | 0 | 2 | 4 | 7 |
| (United States) 1991 | Did not qualify | | | | | | | | | 2 | 0 | 0 | 2 | 0 | 5 |
| (United States) (Mexico) 1993 | Did not enter | | | | | | | | | Did not enter | | | | | |
| (United States) 1996 | Did not qualify | | | | | | | | | 5 | 3 | 1 | 1 | 11 | 11 |
| (United States) 1998 | Did not qualify | | | | | | | | | 1 | 0 | 0 | 1 | 1 | 2 |
| (United States) 2000 | Did not qualify | | | | | | | | | 6 | 2 | 1 | 3 | 8 | 13 |
| (United States) 2002 | Did not enter | | | | | | | | | Did not enter | | | | | |
| (United States) (Mexico) 2003 | Did not qualify | | | | | | | | | 4 | 1 | 1 | 2 | 3 | 6 |
| (United States) 2005 | Withdrew | | | | | | | | | Withdrew | | | | | |
| (United States) 2007 | Did not qualify | | | | | | | | | 3 | 0 | 1 | 2 | 1 | 7 |
| (United States) 2009 | Did not qualify | | | | | | | | | 5 | 1 | 1 | 3 | 5 | 11 |
| as Curaçao | | | | | | | | | | as Curaçao | | | | | |
| (United States) 2011 | Did not qualify | | | | | | | | | 3 | 0 | 1 | 2 | 5 | 7 |
| (United States) 2013 | Did not qualify | | | | | | | | | 3 | 0 | 0 | 3 | 2 | 11 |
| (United States) (Canada) 2015 | Did not qualify | | | | | | | | | 9 | 2 | 3 | 4 | 11 | 15 |
| (United States) 2017 | Group stage | 11th | 3 | 0 | 0 | 3 | 0 | 6 | Squad | 6 | 5 | 0 | 1 | 18 | 4 |
| (United States) (Costa Rica) (Jamaica) 2019 | Quarter-finals | 8th | 4 | 1 | 1 | 2 | 2 | 3 | Squad | 4 | 3 | 0 | 1 | 22 | 2 |
| (United States) 2021 | Qualified but withdrew | | | | | | | | | 4 | 1 | 2 | 1 | 3 | 3 |
| (United States) (Canada) 2023 | Did not qualify | | | | | | | | | 5 | 1 | 1 | 3 | 3 | 9 |
| (United States) (Canada) 2025 | Group stage | 10th | 3 | 0 | 2 | 1 | 2 | 3 | Squad | 6 | 4 | 1 | 1 | 15 | 3 |
| Total | Third place | 7/28 | 33 | 8 | 8 | 17 | 35 | 68 | — | 84 | 27 | 19 | 34 | 122 | 138 |

== Match overview ==
| Tournament | Round | Opponent | Score | Venue |
|---|---|---|---|---|
| (El Salvador) 1963 | First round | Mexico | 2–1 | Santa Ana |
| (El Salvador) 1963 | First round | Costa Rica | 0–1 | Santa Ana |
| (El Salvador) 1963 | First round | Jamaica | 2–1 | Santa Ana |
| (El Salvador) 1963 | Final round | Costa Rica | 0–1 | San Salvador |
| (El Salvador) 1963 | Final round | El Salvador | 2–3 | San Salvador |
| (El Salvador) 1963 | Final round | Honduras | 4–1 | San Salvador |
| (Guatemala) 1965 | Final round | Haiti | 1–1 | Guatemala City |
| (Guatemala) 1965 | Final round | Mexico | 0–5 | Guatemala City |
| (Guatemala) 1965 | Final round | Costa Rica | 0–6 | Guatemala City |
| (Guatemala) 1965 | Final round | Guatemala | 2–3 | Guatemala City |
| (Guatemala) 1965 | Final round | El Salvador | 1–1 | Guatemala City |
| (Costa Rica) 1969 | Final round | Costa Rica | 1–2 | San José |
| (Costa Rica) 1969 | Final round | Guatemala | 1–6 | San José |
| (Costa Rica) 1969 | Final round | Trinidad and Tobago | 3–1 | San José |
| (Costa Rica) 1969 | Final round | Mexico | 2–2 | San José |
| (Costa Rica) 1969 | Final round | Jamaica | 2–1 | San José |
| (Haiti) 1973 | Final round | Haiti | 0–3 | Port-au-Prince |
| (Haiti) 1973 | Final round | Guatemala | 2–2 | Port-au-Prince |
| (Haiti) 1973 | Final round | Mexico | 0–8 | Port-au-Prince |
| (Haiti) 1973 | Final round | Honduras | 2–2 | Port-au-Prince |
| (Haiti) 1973 | Final round | Trinidad and Tobago | 0–4 | Port-au-Prince |
| (United States) 2017 | Group stage | Jamaica | 0–2 | San Diego |
| (United States) 2017 | Group stage | El Salvador | 0–2 | Denver |
| (United States) 2017 | Group stage | Mexico | 0–2 | San Antonio |
| (United States) (Costa Rica) (Jamaica) 2019 | Group stage | El Salvador | 0–1 | Kingston |
| (United States) (Costa Rica) (Jamaica) 2019 | Group stage | Honduras | 1–0 | Houston |
| (United States) (Costa Rica) (Jamaica) 2019 | Group stage | Jamaica | 1–1 | Los Angeles |
| (United States) (Costa Rica) (Jamaica) 2019 | Quarter-finals | United States | 0–1 | Philadelphia |
| (United States) (Canada) 2025 | Group stage | El Salvador | 0–0 | San Jose |
| (United States) (Canada) 2025 | Group stage | Canada | 1–1 | Houston |
| (United States) (Canada) 2025 | Group stage | Honduras | 1–2 | San Jose |
