= Edwin Abath =

Aruban politician

Minister Plenipotentiary of Aruba
- In office 1 November 2009 – 13 November 2013
- Preceded by: Frido Croes
- Succeeded by: Alfonso Boekhoudt

Personal details
- Born: Edwin Bibiano Abath; 2 December 1958 (age 67) Aruba
- Party: Aruban People's Party

Edwin Bibiano Abath (born 2 December 1958) is an Aruban politician and former singer who served as Minister Plenipotentiary of Aruba from 1 November 2009 to 13 November 2013. From 1999 until 2005 he was a Member of Parliament for the Aruban People's Party in the Estates of Aruba. He represented Aruba in the OTI Festival 1989 with the song "Mi viejo".

== Biography ==
Abath was born in Aruba, one of the Caribbean islands of the Lesser Antilles and a country of the Kingdom of the Netherlands. After he finished havo on Aruba, he went to Radboud University Nijmegen in the Netherlands to study logopaedics. He practised as a logopaedic at Dr. Horacio E. Oduber Hospital in Aruba.

== Music ==
In 1988 he collaborated with Venezuelan pop singer Devorah Sasha in the single "Simplemente así" sung in both English and Spanish.
