= Dave Benton =

Aruban-born Estonian musician (born 1951)

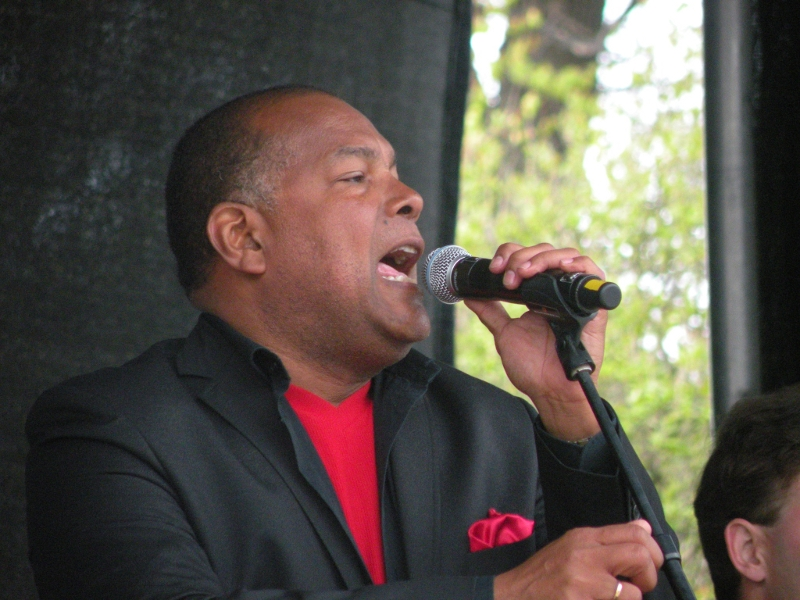
- Dave Benton in 2009

Background information
- Born: Efrem Eugene Benita; 31 January 1951 (age 75); Oranjestad, Aruba
- Genres: Pop

Efrem Eugene Benita (born 31 January 1951), also known as Dave Benton, is an Aruban-born Estonian pop musician. He won the Eurovision Song Contest 2001 along Tanel Padar and 2XL with the song "Everybody" representing Estonia.

== Biography ==
Efrem Eugene Benita was born in 1951 on the Caribbean island of Aruba, he went to local schools. He was fluent in English, Dutch, Spanish, and Papiamento, the creole language of the island. He married and had a daughter. In his 20s, he separated from his wife and moved to the United States. As a drummer and a backing vocalist, he worked with The Drifters, Tom Jones, Billy Ocean, José Feliciano, and The Platters.

In 1981, after winning the Antillean national final for the OTI Festival with his own song "Vaya un amigo", he represented the Netherlands Antilles in the OTI Festival 1981, where he finished in 20th place –second-to-last– with two points.

While living in the Netherlands in the 1980s, he met his future wife Maris, an Estonian, on a cruise ship. They settled in Estonia in 1997 and had two daughters. He has had a varied musical career in Northern European countries. He speaks eight languages: English, Spanish, Papiamento, Dutch, French, German, Portuguese, and Estonian. He performed in the German production of the musical City Lights, after which he was asked to replace Engelbert Humperdinck on his Australian tour.

He has released and produced quite a few albums already, one of which in his native tongue, Papiamento. He has had more of a career as a performing artist.

On 3 February 2001, Benton participated along budding Estonian rock singer Tanel Padar and boyband 2XL in Eurolaul 2001, the national final organised by Eesti Televisioon in order to select its entry for the 46th edition of the Eurovision Song Contest. They won the competition with their song "Everybody", so they went to represent Estonia in Eurovision. On 12 May 2001, they competed with their song in the Eurovision Song Contest held in Copenhagen, which they eventually won after receiving 198 points. At the age of 50 years and 101 days at the day of the contest, Benton is the oldest singer ever to win the Eurovision Song Contest.

In 2021, Benton's daughter Sissi participated in Eesti Laul 2021 with the song "Time", attempting to follow in her father's footsteps and represent Estonia in the Eurovision Song Contest 2021. She qualified to the superfinal, where she placed second.

== Other information ==
- Benton won the Eurovision Song Contest for Estonia, before he had learned to speak Estonian.
- In 2010, Benton participated as a celebrity contestant on the fourth season of Tantsud tähtedega, an Estonian version of Dancing with the Stars. His professional dancing partner was Valeria Fetissova.
- He is a grandfather.

Awards and achievements
Preceded by (Denmark) Olsen Brothers with "Fly on the Wings of Love"	Winner of the Eurovision Song Contest (with Tanel Padar and 2XL); 2001	Succeeded by (Latvia) Marie N with "I Wanna"
Preceded by Ines with "Once in a Lifetime"	Estonia in the Eurovision Song Contest (with Tanel Padar and 2XL); 2001	Succeeded by Sahlene with "Runaway"
Preceded by Lidwina Booi with "Amor para ti"	Netherlands Antilles in the OTI Festival (as Efrem Benita); 1981	Succeeded by Sharon Rose with "Alguien que no seas tú"
