= Telecuraçao =

PJC-TV
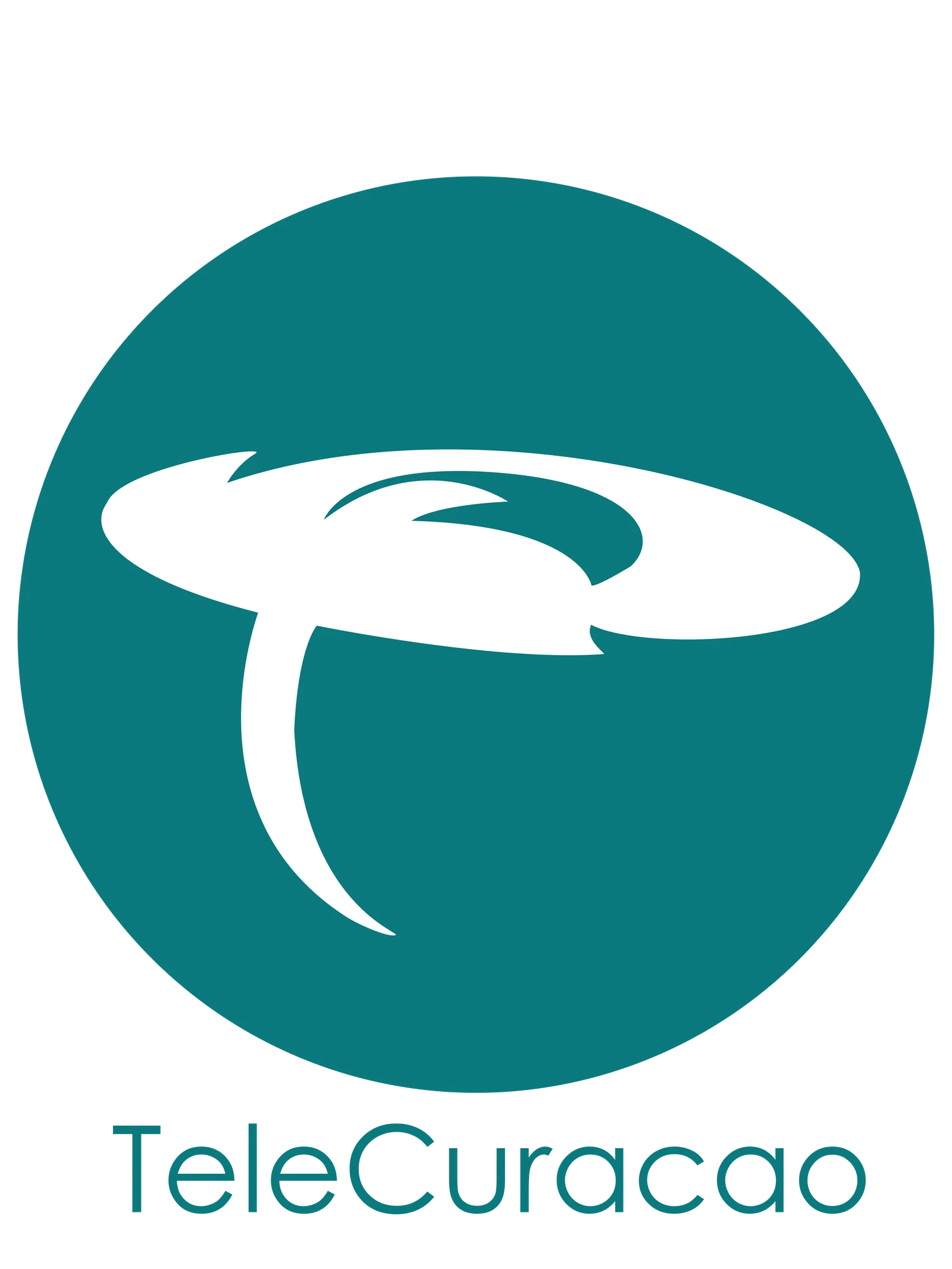

Willemstad; Curaçao
- Channels: Analog: 8 (VHF); Digital: 26 (UHF); Virtual: 8.1 TeleCuraçao / IND 8.2 TeleCuraçao 2 8.3 How TV
- Branding: TeleCuraçao

History
- Founded: July 31, 1960

Links
- Website: www.telecuracao.com

TeleCuraçao (Call sign: PJC-TV) is a television station that broadcasts in analog on NTSC channel 8 in Curaçao, with a repeater in Bonaire on channel 16. The station was founded on July 31, 1960, as the Netherlands Antilles' first television station. American broadcaster Gerald Bartell founded the station with the assistance of the local government, and assisted Telearuba in starting up later on. At one point, the station had expanded across the remaining ABC islands with repeaters (such as on Aruba).

Initially, the station aired mostly American series (such as Gunsmoke), with local news, but gradually began producing more and more of its own programming, to rely less on American imports, and cater more to local tastes.

== History ==
The station was launched by the Bartell Group on July 31, 1960, with the launch night, planned for four weeks in advance, featuring American celebrities. The following day, it started its regular five-hour schedule (6pm to 11pm) with 20% of its output being live. Nederlandse Televisie Stichting provided programming from the Dutch mainland. NTS sent eight hours of programming. The group later started Telearuba.

From September 1, 1960, the station started airing Nederlandse Weekjournaal, a televised newsreel which was compiled by NTS with resources from Radio Nederland Wereldomroep. The station published an announcement in the local press in June 1962 protesting against its restriction of its carriage of an interview with Adam Rapacki, Polish minister of foreign relations, who was in Curaçao while on route from Caracas to Cuba.

The contract with Bartell expired on December 12, 1967; as consequence, control of the station was handed over to the central government of the Netherlands Antilles on September 12, 1968.

As part of Curaçao's digital television transition in 2013, TeleCuraçao added a digital simulcast on UHF 26 in DVB-T, with two additional subchannels.

== See also ==
- List of Caribbean television channels
- Nos Pais Television
- Telearuba
- RTV-7
