= Palm Beach, Aruba =

Beach in Aruba

Palm Beach
- Locality and beach
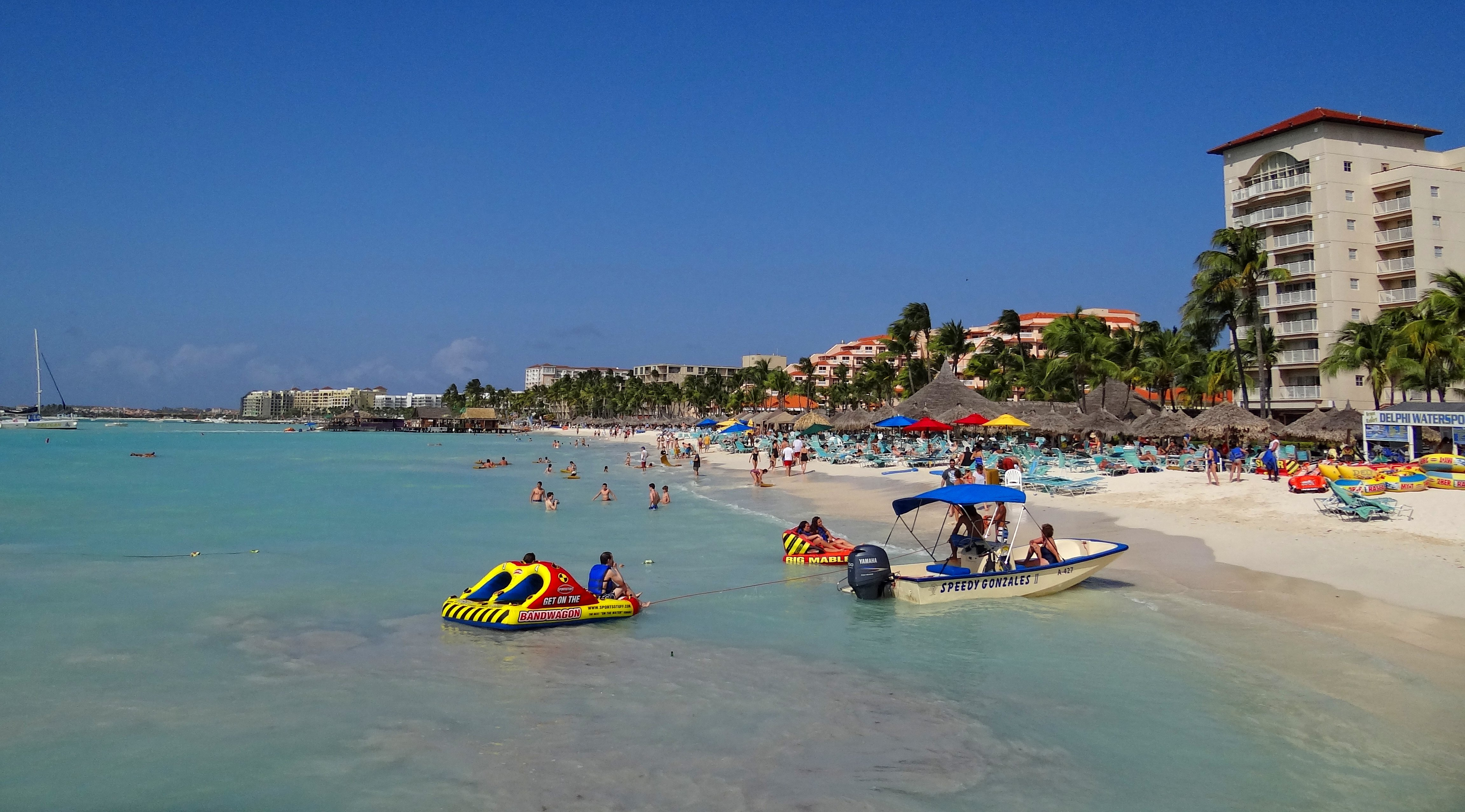
- Palm Beach, Aruba
- Interactive map of Palm Beach
- Coordinates: 12°34′07.59″N 70°02′31.85″W
- Country: Kingdom of the Netherlands
- Constituent country: Aruba
- Region: Noord

Area
  - Total: 8.726 km^{2} (3.369 sq mi)

Population (2020)
  - Total: 5,637
  - Density: 646/km^{2} (1,670/sq mi)

Palm Beach is a tourism district about 6 kilometers (3.7 miles) northwest of Oranjestad, the capital of Aruba. Many high-rise hotels are located there, such as Hyatt Regency Aruba Resort & Casino, Aruba Marriott Resort & Stellaris Casino, Barceló, Holiday Inn SunSpree Resort, Ritz Carlton Resort, and RIU Palace Aruba. A shopping district adjacent to the hotels was finished in 2009 and includes two large malls called Paseo Herencia and Palm Beach Plaza Mall. Little North of Palm Beach is Malmok Beach, a small sandy strip running all the way to the northern tip of Aruba. Smaller apartment complexes and luxurious holiday homes are located along this dead-end Boulevard. Hadicurari Beach (kiting), Arashi Beach and Boca Catalina (snorkeling) are popular locations.

== History ==
Palm Beach is the name of a region in the district of Noord. Its adjacent shoreline beach was officially registered under the same name in 1960. The name "Palm Beach" is derived from the name of the coconut plantation of R.J. (Capt) Beaujon, who named it after Palm Beach, Florida. Located on government land, its lease was rescinded for hotel development in 1958.

The first people to live on the beach were Caquetios Indians from the Arawak tribe in 100 A.D. Later, in 1499, Spanish explorer Alonso de Ojeda discovered the island and created a small garrison. The Dutch took over the island soon after, and it remained in Dutch power from then on, with a short interruption of English rule in 1805 during the Napoleonic wars.

It was not until 1947 that Palm Beach's first tourist office opened. The first hotel opened in the fifties, actually a competition was held to find the best design for the hotel. The winner's name was Ernst Bartels, and his idea was called the 'Basiroeti’ based on the name of the beach location namesake. The hotel would end up being called Hotel Basiruti. Hotel Basi-Ruti was not a high-rise; bungalows on the bare sand comprised the new hotel. Since 1983, it is a high-rise timeshare hotel called Playa Linda Beach Resort.

In 1962, De Olde Molen, a windmill from Wedderveer in the Netherlands, was rebuilt near Bubali and is used as a restaurant and landmark.

The Bubali Bird Sanctuary is located near the hotels in Bubali, Palm Beach.
