= Telearuba 13 =

Television station in Aruba

P4A 13

Pos Chiquito / Oranjestad; Aruba
- Channels: Analog: 13
- Branding: Telearuba

Ownership
- Owner: SETAR

History
- Founded: 29 September 1963
- Former call signs: PJA-TV (1963-1996)
- Former channel number(s): 12 (1963-1975)

Links
- Website: novus.telearuba.aw

Telearuba (Call sign: P4A 13) is a television station that broadcasts on NTSC channel 13 in Aruba with an effective radiated power of 3,456 watts. The station was founded on 29 September 1963 on channel to offer local programming. Instrumental in the creation was the role of the Bartell Group, a United States–based set of radio and television stations, as the government of the Netherlands Antilles joined with the Bartell Group to form the Netherlands Antilles Television & Electronic Company.

The new station received interference from a local Venevisión affiliate in Venezuela, also on channel 12, and was given permission to move to channel 13 later on. The station also received some technical assistance from TeleCuraçao (PJC-TV), which had also set up a relay transmitter in Aruba. On 12 September 1968, exactly nine months after it and TeleCuraçao's contract with Bartell expired, the station was put under government control. The station converted to colour broadcasts in 1973. When Aruba gained its separate status from Curaçao in 1986, the station cut its ties with TeleCuraçao (which remained a part of the government of the Netherlands Antilles), becoming an independent operation.

In 2004, Aruban cable company SETAR acquired Telearuba and initiated a process of digitization of its equipments. In March 2005, the new administration unveiled a new logo for the channel. The station invested in a new broadcasting truck in 2007 to operate on both analog and standard definition. In 2009, Telearuba changed to digital equipment in readiness for the start of high definition broadcasts and started recording content using hard disks and memory cards. The following year, Telearuba started HD broadcasts. Its outside truck was converted in 2017 in order to use high definition equipment.

== See also ==
- TeleCuraçao
- 15 ATV
- RTV-7
