= Venezuela in the OTI Festival =

- OTI Festival
- Participating broadcaster: 1972–1978: Radio Caracas Televisión (RCTV); 1979–1989: Venevisión; 1990–2000: Venezolana de Televisión

Participation summary
- Appearances: 28
- First appearance: 1972
- Last appearance: 2000
- Highest placement: 1st: 1982, 1987
- Host: 1979
- Participation history: 1972; 1973; 1974; 1975; 1976; 1977; 1978; 1979; 1980; 1981; 1982; 1983; 1984; 1985; 1986; 1987; 1988; 1989; 1990; 1991; 1992; 1993; 1994; 1995; 1996; 1997; 1998; 2000

The participation of Venezuela in the OTI Festival began at the first OTI Festival in 1972. The Venezuelan participating broadcasters were in turn Radio Caracas Televisión (RCTV), Venevisión, and Venezolana de Televisión, which were members of the Organización de Televisión Iberoamericana (OTI). They participated in all twenty-eight editions of the festival. They won twice: in 1982 and 1987; and hosted the event once, in 1979.

== History ==
Venezuela won the festival on two occasions, the first one in 1982 with "Puedes contar conmigo" performed by the teenage boy band Grupo Unicornio. Their second victory came in 1987 with "La felicidad está en un rincón en tu corazón" by Alfredo Alejandro. Apart from their victories, the country got two second places in 1976 and 1979 and three third places in 1974, 1975, and 1994.

Many Venezuelan singers well known in all Ibero-America, such as Jose Luis Rodríguez "El Puma", her daughter Lilibeth Morillo, Mirla Castellanos, and Delia Dorta represented Venezuela in the festival with successful participations.

Venezuela hosted the contest in 1979. The venue of the festival was the Teatro del Círculo Militar of Caracas and the presenters were Eduardo Serrano and Carmen Victoria Pérez, who presented the event in a golden and blue colored stage. The opening theme of this edition of the festival was an orchestral fantasy based on the hymn, "Alma llanera".

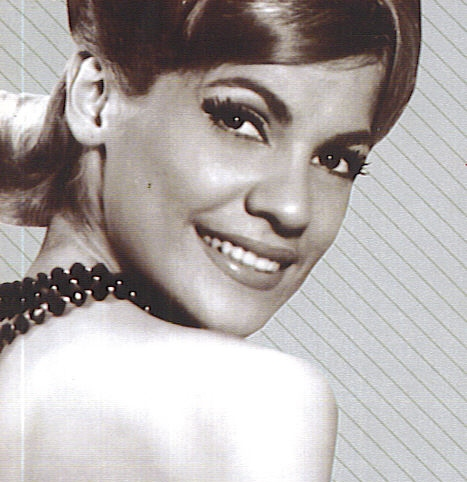
Mirla Castellanos got fourth place in 1972 and third place in 1975

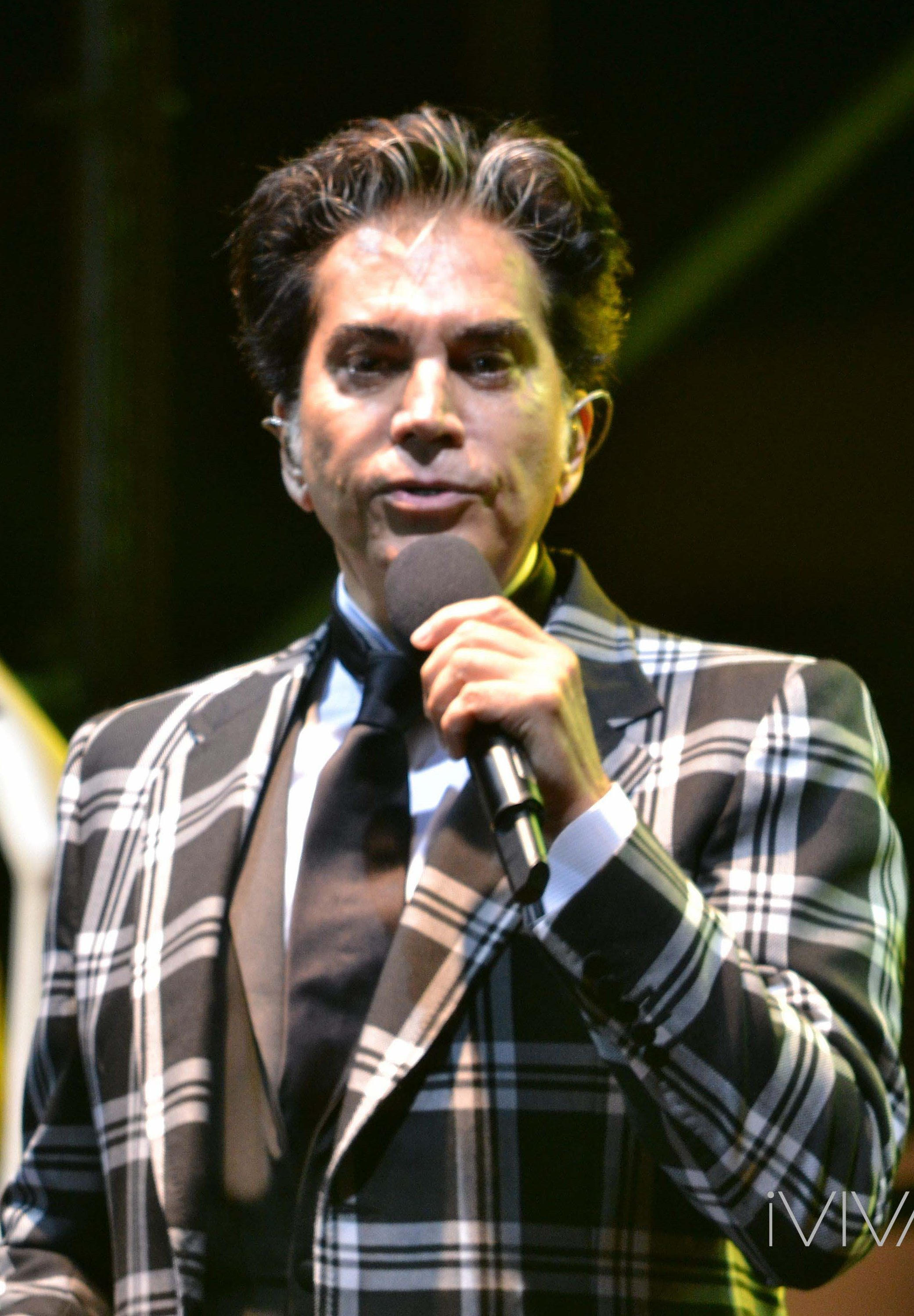
Jose Luis Rodríguez "El Puma" got third place in 1974

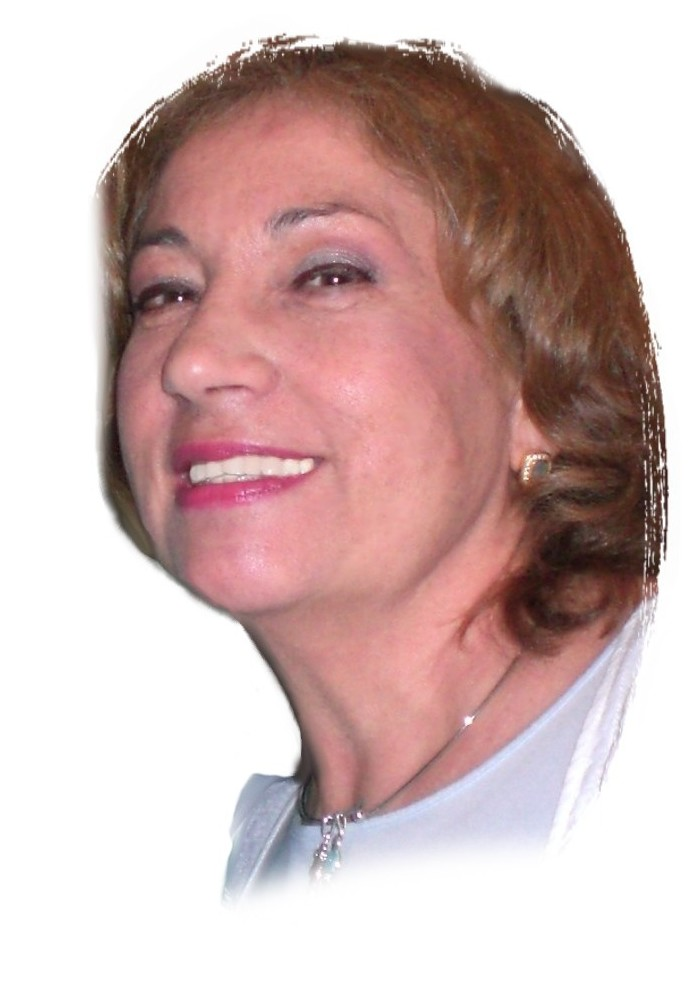
María Teresa Chacín got a top-five place in 1983

== Participation overview ==
Table key
1	First place
2	Second place
3	Third place
F	Finalist
SF	Semi-finalist
◇	Contest cancelled

Year	Song	Artist	Songwriter(s)	Conductor	Place	Points
1972	"Sueños de cristal y miel"	Mirla Castellanos	Pablo Schneider	Eduardo Cabrera	4	6
1973	"Poema para el olvido"	Mayra Martí	Eduardo Cabrera; María de Lourdes Devonish	Eduardo Cabrera	9	3
1974	"Vuelve"	Jose Luis Rodríguez	Pablo Schneider	Aníbal Abreu	3	11
1975	"Soy como el viento, soy como el mar"	Mirla Castellanos	Luisito Rey	Eduardo Cabrera	3	10
1976	"Soy"	Las Cuatro Monedas	Marlene O'Brien; Kenny O'Brien; Víctor Daniel		2	13
1977	"Iberoamérica toda"	Héctor José	Esteban Ballester; Hernán Ríos	Cholo Ortiz	6	3
1978	"Con la suerte a mi favor"	Nancy Ramos	Francisco Belisario		15	2
1979	"Cuando era niño"	Delia Dorta	José "Pollo" Sifontes	Anibal Abreu	2	33
1980	"Haces bien"	Héctor Cabrera	Pablo Schneider	Eduardo Cabrera	18	5
1981	"Aquel ciego"	Neyda Perdomo	César Menessini		17	7
1982	"Puedes contar conmigo"	Grupo Unicornio	Luis Gerardo Tovar; Carlos Moreán	Carlos Moreán	1	43
1983	"Esperanza americana"	María Teresa Chacín	Chelique Sarabia	Eduardo Cabrera	Top-5	—N/a
1984	"Ilusión de un soñador"	José Antonio García Hernández	Agni Mogollón	Arnoldo Nali	—N/a	
1985	"El primer vuelo"	Doris Hernández	Pablo Schneider	Carlos Moreán	—N/a	
1986	"Un nuevo amanecer"	Nilda López	Luis Cruz	Horacio Saavedra	—N/a	
1987	"La felicidad está en un rincón en tu corazón"	Alfredo Alejandro	Luis Gerardo Tovar; Arnoldo Nali	Arnoldo Nali	1	—N/a
1988	"Hoy he vuelto a reír"	Iñaki	Fernando Osorio; Juan Carlos Pérez Soto	William Croes	14	0
1989	"Caras perdidas"	Salvador	Rafael Grecco		—N/a	
1990	"Sé mujer"	Lilibeth Rodríguez	Lila Morillo	Arnoldo Nali	—N/a	
1991	"Podría suceder"	Jesús Alfredo Ruiz	Jesús Alfredo Ruiz	Chucho Ferrer	SF	—N/a
1992	"Sueños"	Karolina	Luis Alva		—N/a	
1993	"No me arriesgo"	Nicolás Felizzola	Alejandro Salas	Alejandro Salas	—N/a	
1994	"Enfurecida"	Luis Silva	J. Leonardo; Luis Silva; L. Oliver		3	16
1995	"El viaje"	Rogelio Ortiz	Simón Díaz	Alí Agüero	—N/a	
1996	"Junto a tu boca"	Dina	Jean Paul Cole		—N/a	
1997	"Nada igual que tu amor"	Félix Valentino	Félix Valentino	Alejandro Salas	F	—N/a
1998	"Mas allá"	Asdrúbal Astudillo	Erick Gabriel	Alejandro Salas	F	—N/a
1999	Contest cancelled ◇					
2000	"Yo cantante"	Mary Olga Rodríguez	Alicia Lozada		SF	—N/a

== Hosting ==
Year	City	Venue	Hosts	Ref.
1979	Caracas	Teatro del Círculo Militar	Eduardo Serrano; Carmen Victoria Pérez	
