= Cuando quiero llorar no lloro (film) =

1973 film

- Film poster
- Directed by: Mauricio Walerstein
- Written by: Miguel Otero Silva; Mauricio Walerstein
- Starring: Orlando Urdaneta
- Cinematography: Abigail Rojas
- Release date: July 1973
- Running time: 85 minutes
- Country: Venezuela
- Language: Spanish

Cuando quiero llorar no lloro (English: When I Want To Cry, I Don't) is a 1973 Venezuelan drama film directed by Mauricio Walerstein based in the homonymous novel by Miguel Otero Silva. It was entered into the 8th Moscow International Film Festival.

== Plot ==
In 1948 Venezuela three children are born on the same day, all named Victorino were born. One is a poor mulatto, Victorino Pérez; the second is Victorino Perdomo, from a middle class communist family; and the third is Victorino Peralta, of society's upper echelons.

Eighteen years later, the three are living very different lives. Pérez is in and out of prison and violent situations from childhood; Perdomo falls from middle-class grace as communism is rejected; Peralta spends much of his time surrounded by luxury and many women, ensconced in the same violence as the other Victorinos but never getting in trouble. However, all three die young: Pérez shot when running from police, Perdomo tortured by enemies, and Peralta crashed his car dreaming of being a boy racer.

== Cast ==
- Orlando Urdaneta as Victorino Pérez
- Pedro Laya as Victorino Perdomo
- Valentin Trujillo as Victorino Peralta
- Fernando Arriaga
- Haydée Balza
- Rafael Briceño
- Miguel Ángel Landa
- Liliana Durán
- Verónica Castro
