= Roberto Torres (musician) =

Cuban musician

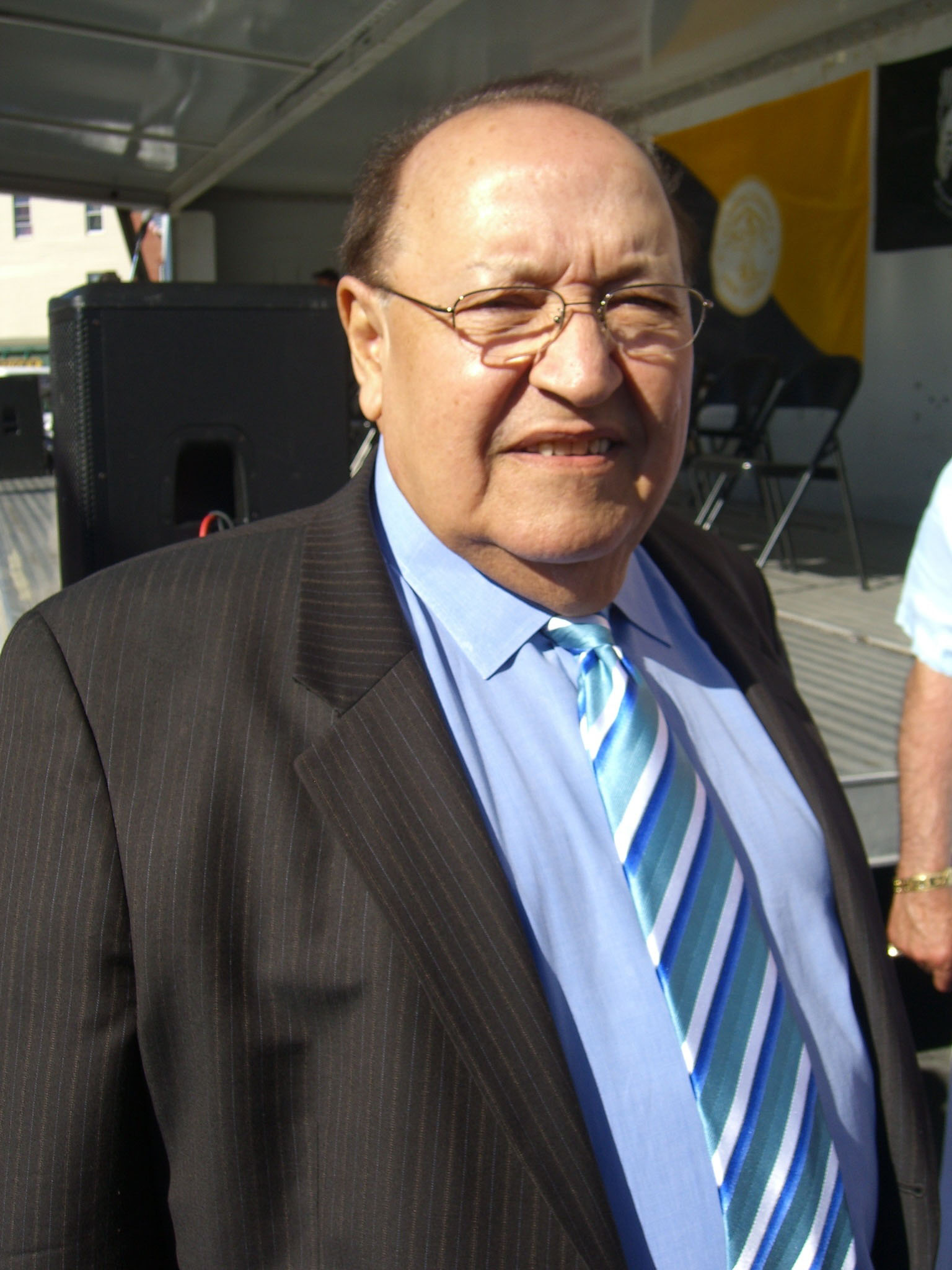
- Torres at a ceremony in Union City, New Jersey, where was honored with a star at Celia Cruz Plaza.

Background information
- Born: 10 February 1938 (age 87); Güines, Cuba
- Genres: Charanga, vallenata, son cubano, salsa
- Occupation(s): Musician, producer, record executive
- Instrument(s): Vocals, percussion
- Years active: 1956–present
- Labels: Guajiro, SAR

Roberto Torres (born 10 February 1938) is a Cuban singer, percussionist, bandleader and producer. Born in Güines, Cuba, he moved to the United States in 1959, where he became involved in the Latin music scenes of New York and Miami. In 1979, he founded two record labels, Guajiro Records and its subsidiary, SAR, both devoted to Cuban music. As a singer and musician, he is famous for his combination of Cuban and Colombian music, which he termed "charanga vallenata". His biggest hit was a cover version of Simón Díaz's "Caballo Viejo". He was a member of the Sonora Matancera for three years. He has also appeared in music documentaries such as Son sabrosón: antesala de la salsa.

On 2 June 2011, the Cuban-American community of Union City, New Jersey honored Torres with a star on the Walk of Fame at Celia Cruz Plaza.
