= United States in the OTI Festival 1982 =

- OTI Festival 1982
- Participating broadcaster: Spanish International Network (SIN)
- Country: United States
- Selection process: National OTI–SIN Festival
- Selection date: 23 October 1982

Competing entry
- Song: "Qué equivocado"
- Artist: Laura Hevia
- Songwriter: Laura Hevia

Placement
- Final result: 3rd, 25 points

Participation chronology
◄1981 •	1982	• 1983►

The United States was represented at the OTI Festival 1982 with the song "Qué equivocado", written and performed by Laura Hevia. The participating broadcaster representing the country, the Spanish International Network (SIN), selected its entry through a national televised competition. The song, that was performed in position 9, placed third with 25 points, out of 21 competing entries.

== National stage ==
The Spanish International Network (SIN) held a national televised competition to select its entry for the 11th edition of the OTI Festival. This was the fifth edition of the National OTI–SIN Festival. In the final, each song represented a SIN affiliate, each of which had selected its entry through a local pre-selection.

=== San Antonio pre-selection ===
On Saturday 21 August 1982, KWEX-TV held a televised pre-selection at the La Villita Assembly Hall in San Antonio, beginning at 22:00 CDT (03:00+1 UTC). This edition of the San Antonio Local OTI Festival featured eleven songs, shortlisted from the 45 received. The musical director was Fred Salas, who conducted the 12-piece orchestra. The show featured a guest performance by José Salvador. It was broadcast on Channel 41 on Thursday 26 August, beginning at 19:30 CDT (00:30+1 UTC).

The jury was composed of six members. The winner, and therefore qualified for the national final, was "Mañana un futuro", written and performed by Efraín Sánchez Palacios; with "Mi guitarra y mi voz", written by Juan Manuel Delgado and Leo Reyzano, and performed by Delgado himself, placing second; and "Regresa", written and performed by Ángel Alexander Álvarez, placing third.

Qualifier

Result of the Local OTI Festival – San Antonio 1982 (Note: Incomplete list of the competing entries.)
R/O	Song	Artist	Songwriter(s)	Result
	"Mañana un futuro"	Efraín Sánchez Palacios	Efraín Sánchez Palacios	Qualified
	"Voy a brindar"	Alberto Argüelles	Miguel Nacel	—N/a
	"Regresa"	Ángel Alexander Álvarez	Ángel Alexander Álvarez	3
	"Yo canto de alegría"	Sergio Ruiz	Sergio Ruiz	4
	"Mi guitarra y mi voz"	Juan Manuel Delgado	Juan Manuel Delgado; Leo Reyzano	2
	"No lo puedo olvidar"		Marilú Castillo	—N/a

=== Central California pre-selection ===
KFTV held a televised pre-selection at its studios in Hanford. This was the fifth edition of the Central California Local OTI Festival. It was broadcast live on Channel 21 and on Radio Bilingüe.

The winner, and therefore qualified for the national final, was "Lo eres todo para mí", written and performed by Armando Aranda.

Result of the Local OTI Festival – Central California 1982
R/O	Song	Artist	Songwriter(s)	Result
	"Lo eres todo para mí"	Armando Aranda	Armando Aranda	Qualified

=== Los Angeles pre-selection ===
KMEX-TV held a televised pre-selection in Los Angeles. This was the fourth edition of the Los Angeles Local OTI Festival. It was broadcast on Channel 34.

The winner, and therefore qualified for the national final, was "Flor", written and performed by Yari Moré.

Result of the Local OTI Festival – Los Angeles 1982
R/O	Song	Artist	Songwriter(s)	Result
	"Flor"	Yari Moré	Yari Moré	Qualified

=== Final ===
The final was held on Saturday 23 October 1982 in Miami. It was broadcast live on all SIN affiliates. The winner was "Qué equivocado", written and performed by Laura Hevia.

Winner

Result of the final of the National OTI–SIN Festival 1982
R/O	Song	Artist	Affiliate	Result
	"Qué equivocado"	Laura Hevia		1
	"Lo eres todo para mí"	Armando Aranda	KFTV–Fresno	
	"Flor"	Yari Moré	KMEX-TV–Los Angeles	3
	"Mañana un futuro"	Efraín Sánchez Palacios	KWEX-TV–San Antonio	

== At the OTI Festival ==
On 27 November 1982, the OTI Festival was held at the Coliseo Amauta in Lima, Peru, hosted by Panamericana Televisión, and broadcast live throughout Ibero-America. Laura Hevia performed "Qué equivocado" in position 9, with Héctor Garrido conducting the event's orchestra, and placing third out of 21 competing entries with 25 points.

=== Voting ===
Each participating broadcaster, or group of broadcasters that jointly participated representing a country, appointed a juror who awarded 5–1 points to their five favourite songs in order of preference. The juror representing the United States was Omar Marchant.

Points awarded to the United States
Score	Country
5 points	Costa Rica
4 points	Bolivia; Brazil; Mexico
3 points	Netherlands Antilles; Spain
2 points	Chile
1 point	

Points awarded by the United States
Score	Country
5 points	Mexico
4 points	Venezuela
3 points	Spain
2 points	Colombia
1 point	Chile
