= Isla de sal =

- Directed by: Clemente de la Cerda
- Written by: Mauricio Odreman
- Produced by: Mario Bartolomei
- Starring: Lila Morillo; Simón Díaz; Doris Wells; Orangel Delfín; Efraín de la Cerda
- Cinematography: Edmundo Raffaldi
- Edited by: Clemente de la Cerda
- Music by: Hugo Blanco
- Distributed by: Diana Films, S.A.
- Release date: 1964
- Running time: 85 minutes
- Country: Venezuela
- Language: Spanish

Isla de sal (English: Salt Island) is a 1964 Venezuelan drama comedy film directed by Clemente de la Cerda. It was his first feature film, but was considered one of his more important works. Later he won national acclaim with his blockbuster Soy un delincuente (1976).

== Plot ==
When Aurora discovers that his father has a big debt for the purchase of a new boat for his work as a fisherman, she decides to emigrate to Caracas with her godfather Simon, for achieve fame and fortune as singer after that Walter Perez, a very famous TV producer, discovers her in her town, Chichiriviche, despite the opposition of Lydia (Walter's lover) and Venancio (Aurora's boyfriend).

== Cast ==
- Lila Morillo ... Aurora
- Simón Díaz ... Simon
- Doris Wells ... Lydia
- Orangel Delfín ... Venancio
- Efraín de la Cerda ... Walter Perez
- Hugo Blanco ... Himself
- Héctor Bayardo
- Jose Vasquez
- Gisela López
- Carlos Flores
- Alba Pinto
- Miguel Angel Fuster
- Nelida Leo

== Production ==
The film introduced Cerda's focus on poverty and marginalization, which he continued in his later works. Due to the political content, he was unable to obtain state funding until the mid-1970s. The director said of the film: "I knew from the start that it was a good movie, but in Venezuela there are no schools, no tradition or film industry, which is why I believe we should start with movies aimed at the general public."

== Reception ==
The movie helped launch the career of the singer Lila Morillo. Talking of this film and El rostro oculto (The Hidden Face) released soon after, a critic said "...these first two films reveal an interesting melange of styles and early technical ability, a search for language which came to an abrupt end in 1976 as the public demanded more and more 'delincuents'". Another commentator said the film was still weighed down with traditional banality, but introduced situations that the viewer could identify with and that might create social concern. By 2010, when the film was shown at the Festival del Cine Venezolano Mérida 2010 it was described a "A Venezuelan film classic".
