= Luis Gerardo Tovar =

Venezuelan actor and musician (born 1932–1991)

- Born: Luis Gerardo Tovar; 4 October 1932; Caracas, Venezuela
- Died: 25 October 1991 (aged 59); Caracas, Venezuela
- Other name: Vértigo
- Occupations: Actor; broadcaster; speaker; singer; songwriter

Luis Gerardo Tovar (4 October 1932 – 25 October 1991) was a Venezuelan actor, broadcaster, announcer, singer, and songwriter. As a radio announcer, he worked for several European radio stations; as an actor, he starred in several Venezuelan films and telenovelas; and as a songwriter, he won the OTI Festival twice representing Venezuela.

== Biography ==
He worked for a year as a writer and broadcaster for Latin America at the British Broadcasting Corporation (BBC) in London, and also worked at other European radio stations such as Radio France Internationale, Deutsche Welle, RAI, and Radio Nacional de España.

As a songwriter, he won the OTI Festival twice representing Venezuela. With Carlos Moreán, he wrote the song "Puedes contar conmigo", which won the OTI Festival 1982 performed by Grupo Unicornio, of which he was the music producer. With Arnoldo Nali, he wrote the song "La felicidad está en un rincón de tu corazón", which won the OTI Festival 1987 performed by Alfredo Alejandro. He was the first songwriter to win the festival twice, out of the four who managed to achieve that.

== Selected filmography ==
=== Film ===
- Adolescence of Cain (1959)
- Lovers Like Us (1975)

==== Telenovelas ====
- Mi secreto me condena (1967)
- La loba (1973)
- La Guaricha (1973–74)
- Isla de brujas (1974)
- La señorita Elena (1975)
- Mariana de la noche (1975–76)
- Daniela (1977)
- El Despertar (1980)
- Siempre hay un mañana (1986)
