= Daniela (1976 TV series) =

- Genre: Telenovela
- Created by: Enrique Jarnés
- Directed by: José Antonio Ferrara
- Starring: Adita Riera; Eduardo Serrano; Herminia Martínez
- Country of origin: Venezuela
- Original language: Spanish
- No. of episodes: 170

Production
- Producer: José Antonio Ferrara
- Production location: Caracas

Original release
- Network: Venevisión
- Release: 1976 – 1976

Daniela is a 1976 Venezuelan telenovela television series written by Enrique Jarnés and produced by Venevisión. Adita Riera and Eduardo Serrano starred as the main protagonists.

== Plot ==
After the death of her father and after having lost everything, Daniela and her mother Eugenia move to a small fishing village in search of a better life. But since they don't have enough money, they end up on the streets. On the other hand, Gustavo Sandoval is a rich millionaire playboy living on his yacht and he has never had any serious relationship. Perla, a beautiful and ambitious girl in the town, decides to conquer him. One day, while walking through the town, Daniela reaches the stall of Ana Maria who sells fried fish. Hungry and without any money, Daniela steals the fish but is discovered by the owner's son, Reuben. Daniela runs and hides inside Gustavo's yacht. Later, her mother falls ill and she takes her to the hospital where they meet Dr. Cruz Dolores who offers to help them. Although Daniela says she won't accept charity, she begins working as a maid at the house of Gustavo.

== Cast ==
- Adita Riera as Daniela
- Eduardo Serrano as Gustavo
- Olga Castillo as Eugenia
- Herminia Martínez as Perla
- Amelia Roman as Ana Maria
- Martin Lantigua as Jose Vicente
- Chelo Rodríguez as Veronica
- Orlando Urdaneta as Ruben
- Zoe Ducos as Cruz Dolores

== See also ==
- List of telenovelas of Venevisión
