= Chelo Rodríguez =

Venezuelan actress and model (1940s–2026)

- Born: María Consuelo Rodríguez Álvarez; February 1941 or 1942; Galicia, Spain
- Died: 12 August 2026 (aged 84); Caracas, Venezuela
- Occupation: Actress
- Spouse: Orlando Urdaneta (div. 1987)
- Children: 1

María Consuelo "Chelo" Rodríguez Álvarez (February 1941 or 1942 – 12 August 2026) was a Spanish-born Venezuelan actress and model, best known for her appearances in 1970s and 1980s telenovelas.

Her career began as a zarzuela performer, and her first onscreen performance was as a dancer on RCTV's El Show de Aldemaro Romero. She then started working as a model and telenovela actress, appearing on shows including La usurpadora (1971), La doña (1972), La loba(1972), La señorita Elena (1975), Daniela (1976), Rafaela (1977), Sueño contigo (1988), La revancha (1989), Mundo de fieras (1991), and Mujercitas (1999). She also worked on stage and in film, appearing in movies such as Bárbara (1974), Compañero Augusto (1976), Soy un delincuente (1976), Fiebre (1976), and Alejandra, mon amour (1979).

== Early life and education ==
It is widely accepted that María Consuelo Rodríguez Álvarez was born in February 1942; though sources give various dates in the 1940s. She was born in Galicia, Spain, to parents Serafín Rodríguez and Leonor Álvarez, in either the town of Sober or the town of Canabal. She had a brother, Carlos. When Rodríguez was a child in the 1950s, she and her family moved to Venezuela where she later became a naturalized citizen. As a child, she said that she wanted to study medicine and, as a teenager, be a model.

Rodríguez attended high school for three years and, afterwards, studied to become a business secretary.

== Career ==
Rodríguez began working in entertainment in zarzuela troupes; her first televised role came after she auditioned to be on El Show de Renny and was instead offered the role of a dancer on RCTV's El Show de Aldemaro Romero. She accepted the role, for which she was paid 800 bolivares a month. Her first appearance in a telenovela came in 1969, when she appeared on Corazón de madre. Rodríguez also modeled during this time, becoming one of Venezuela's first supermodels. Renny Ottolina nicknamed her the "Venezuela's number one model".

During the 1970s and 1980s, Rodríguez became known for her appearances on Venezuelan telenovelas. Often working with RCTV, she appeared on shows such as La usurpadora (1971) and La doña (1972). Her performance in La usurpadora increased her public profile in the country; after viewing her on the show, executives on Venevisión signed Rodríguez to the network and she left RCTV. At Venevisión, she appeared in telenovelas including La loba(1972), La señorita Elena (1975), Daniela (1976), and Rafaela (1977), in which she stared across the Paraguayan actor Arnaldo André; the role made her known outside of Venezuela. She also appeared in films (Bárbara (1974), Compañero Augusto (1976), Soy un delincuente (1976), Fiebre (1976), and Alejandra, mon amour (1979)).

She then took a break from television, returning in the latter part of the 1980s to appear in telenovelas such as Sueño contigo (1988), La revancha (1989), Mundo de fieras (1991), and Mujercitas(1999). In the twenty-first century, she continued to appear in telenovelas, films, and theatre productions. Her final telenovela was the 2008 ¿Vieja yo?

== Personal life and death ==
In the 1970s, while filming La loba, Rodríguez had a relationship with the Venezuelan actor Orlando Urdaneta. The two were engaged in 1975 and had one child, a son born in 1979. An initially acrimonious divorce in 1987 concluded their relationship.

In her final years, Rodríguez was diagnosed with ALS. She died in Caracas on 12 August 2026, at the age of 84, several months after announcing she had been diagnosed with cancer.

== Filmography ==
=== Television ===
- El Show de Aldemaro Romero
- Corazón de madre (1969)
- La usurpadora (1971)
- La doña (1972)
- La loba (1972)
- La señorita Elena (1975)
- Daniela (1976)
- Rafaela (1977)
- La Zulianita (1977)
- María del Mar (1978)
- Sueño contigo (1988)
- La revancha (1989)
- Mundo de fieras (1991)
- Mujercitas(1999)
- Hechizo de amor (2002)
- Engañada (2003)
- Sabor a ti (2004)
- El amor las vuelve locas (2005)
- ¿Vieja yo? (2008)

=== Film ===
- Bárbara (1974)
- Compañero Augusto (1976)
- Soy un delincuente (1976)
- Fiebre (1976)
- Alejandra, mon amour (1979)
- Mia Magdalena
- Parque Central (2018)

=== Theatre ===
- Viva la menopausia (2008)
- Doña Cruela (2009)
