= Mexico in the OTI Festival 1982 =

- OTI Festival 1982
- Participating broadcaster: Televisa
- Country: Mexico
- Selection process: National OTI Festival
- Selection date: 26 September 1982

Competing entry
- Song: "Con y por amor"
- Artist: Enrique Guzmán
- Songwriters: Mario Molina Montes; Chamín Correa

Placement
- Final result: 4th, 22 points

Participation chronology
◄1981 •	1982	• 1983►

Mexico was represented at the OTI Festival 1982 with the song "Con y por amor", written by Mario Molina Montes and Chamín Correa, and performed by Enrique Guzmán. The Mexican participating broadcaster, Televisa, selected its entry through a national televised competition with several phases. The song, that was performed in position 6, placed fourth with 22 points, tying with the entries from Argentina and Costa Rica, out of 21 competing entries.

== National stage ==
Televisa held a national competition with four televised qualifying rounds and a final to select its entry for the 11th edition of the OTI Festival. This eleventh edition of the National OTI Festival featured forty songs, of which ten reached the final. In addition to the general competition, awards were given for Best Male Performer, Best Female Performer, Best Musical Arrangement, Breakout Male Artist, Breakout Female Artist, and Breakout Duo among all the competing artists.

The shows were held at Teatro de la Ciudad in Mexico City, were presented by Raúl Velasco, and were broadcast on Canal 2. The musical director was Chucho Ferrrer, who conducted the orchestra when required.

Competing entries on the National OTI Festival – Mexico 1982
Song	Artist	Songwriter(s)	Conductor
"A ciegas"	Víctor Yturbe	Víctor Yturbe; Jorge Flores; Chamín Correa	Rodrigo Álvarez
"Adonde vaya"	María de los Ángeles	Irasema	
"Alza tu voz"	Amparo Rubín	Amparo Rubín	Sergio Andrade
"Ámame y entrégate o déjame"	Enrique Mottola	Hernán Rocha	
"Amor de paso"	Massías	Jorge Massías; Gil Rivera	Eduardo Magallanes
"Amorcito"	Doris	Mario Arturo; Ignacio González	
"Así de loco"	Joan Sebastian	Joan Sebastian	Rodolfo "Popo" Sánchez
"A partir de ti"	Carminna	Francisco Javier Longitud	Rodolfo "Popo" Sánchez
"Con y por amor"	Enrique Guzmán	Mario Molina Montes; Chamín Correa	Julio Jaramillo
"Creo en ti"	Natalia Baeza	Sonia Rivas	
"Culpable"	Magdalena	Guillermo Méndez Guiú	
"Dueña y señora"	Gil Rivera	Gil Rivera; Jorge Massías	Eduardo Magallanes
"Ecuación entre dos"	Olinsser	Olinsser	
"El momento es hoy"	Roberto Jordán	Roberto Jordán	
"El tiempo aquel"	Polly	Marco Antonio Flores; Guillermo Méndez Guiú	
"Galopando"	Valerio	Antonio del Río; Tony Flores; Valerio	
"Gaviota perdida"	Roberto Cantoral (Note: Roberto Cantoral replaced the original performer, Guadalupe Jimena, who had to be absent due to feeling unwell.)	Roberto Cantoral	Eduardo Magallanes
"Hoy por ti"	Héctor and Ernesto	Héctor Gómez; Ernesto Merino	
"Llueve tupido el recuerdo"	Ramiro José Esperanza	Ramiro José Esperanza	
"Madera en la piel"	Johnny Laboriel	David Lan; Isabel Álvarez de la Peza	Eugenio Castillo
"Mi amor criticado"	Alondra	Enrique Velázquez; Carolina Valenzuela	Manuel Cervantes
"Oye"	Ángeles Ochoa	Margarita Saavedra	
"Muchas gracias"	Jerónimos	Mario Arturo; Jesús Monárrez	
"Nunca, nunca"	Hermanos Urbán	Carlos Vargas; Rubén González	
"Pero me amas"	Aurora	Roxana Rosas	Arturo Castro
"Pierdo"	José Alberto Fuentes	José Alberto Fuentes	Chucho Ferrer
"Si hoy me quieres olvidar"	Arianna	Mario Antonio Campos; Jonathán Zarzosa	Jonathán Zarzosa
"Siempre habrá golondrinas"	Sola	Candelario Macedo	
"Simplemente una mujer"	Rossana Resquín	Paco Michel	
"Sólo contigo"	Jorge Luke	Hernán Rocha	Guillermo Méndez Guiú
"Soñador"	Oskar	Alfredo Arroyo	
"Soy un pasado de moda"	Mario Pintor	Mario Pintor	Luigi Lazareno
"Suavemente"	Crystal	Sergio Andrade	Sergio Andrade
"Te digo adiós"	Jesús	Manuel Antonio Campos; Jesús Monárrez	Eduardo Magallanes
"Tímido"	Los Baby's	Héctor Meneses; Diana Xóchitl Burello	Enrique Neri
"Vamos jugando"	David Haro	David Haro	
"Víctima o ladrón"	María Medina	Amparo Rubín	Sergio Andrade
"Y hablando de nostalgia"	Prisma	Candelario Macedo	Luigi Lazareno
"Y te daré"	Bacará	Fernando Acosta	Salomón Jiménez
"Yo te diré"	Óscar Athié	Óscar Athié	

=== Qualifying rounds ===
The four qualifying rounds were held on Saturdays 21 and 28 August, and 4 and 11 September 1982. Each round featured ten entries, and the ten highest-scoring entries among the 40 competing advanced to the final. Several expert jurors present in the hall and five remote provincial juries scored all the entries in each round.

Qualifier

Result of the qualifying rounds of the National OTI Festival – Mexico 1982
R/O	Song	Artist	Points	Result
First qualifying round – 21 August 1982
1	"El tiempo aquel"	Polly	88	—N/a
2	"Hoy por ti"	Héctor and Ernesto	96	—N/a
3	"Yo te diré"	Óscar Athié	82	—N/a
4	"Culpable"	Magdalena	102	—N/a
5	"Galopando"	Valerio	102	—N/a
6	"A partir de ti"	Carminna	122	Qualified
7	"Soy un pasado de moda"	Mario Pintor	111	Qualified
8	"Creo en ti"	Natalia Baeza	98	—N/a
9	"Ecuación entre dos"	Olinsser	59	—N/a
10	"El momento es hoy"	Roberto Jordán	87	—N/a
Second qualifying round – 28 August 1982
1	"Pero me amas"	Aurora	97	—N/a
2	"Y te daré"	Bacará	83	—N/a
3	"Amor de paso"	Massías	102	—N/a
4	"Te digo adiós"	Jesús	80	—N/a
5	"Y hablando de nostalgia"	Prisma	95	—N/a
6	"Sólo contigo"	Jorge Luke	83	—N/a
7	"Gaviota perdida"	Roberto Cantoral	108	—N/a
8	"Tímido"	Los Baby's	86	—N/a
9	"Mi amor criticado"	Alondra	103	—N/a
10	"A ciegas"	Víctor Yturbe	106	—N/a
Third qualifying round – 4 September 1982
1	"Oye"	Ángeles Ochoa	80	—N/a
2	"Vamos jugando"	David Haro	84	—N/a
3	"Amorcito"	Doris	86	—N/a
4	"Muchas gracias"	Jerónimos	91	—N/a
5	"Simplemente una mujer"	Rossana Resquín	97	—N/a
6	"Soñador"	Oskar	75	—N/a
7	"Alza tu voz"	Amparo Rubín	90	—N/a
8	"Con y por amor"	Enrique Guzmán	118	Qualified
9	"Si hoy me quieres olvidar"	Arianna	120	Qualified
10	"Así de loco"	Joan Sebastian	119	Qualified
Fourth qualifying round – 11 September 1982
1	"Llueve tupido el recuerdo"	Ramiro José Esperanza	81	—N/a
2	"Adonde vaya"	María de los Ángeles	99	—N/a
3	"Nunca, nunca"	Hermanos Urbán	105	—N/a
4	"Siempre habrá golondrinas"	Sola	108	Qualified
5	"Pierdo"	José Alberto Fuentes	109	Qualified
6	"Suavemente"	Crystal	111	Qualified
7	"Dueña y señora"	Gil Rivera	116	Qualified
8	"Víctima o ladrón"	María Medina	123	Qualified
9	"Ámame y entrégate o déjame"	Enrique Mottola	82	—N/a
10	"Madera en la piel"	Johnny Laboriel	108	—N/a

Detailed Vote of the first qualifying round
R/O	Song	Provincial juries					Jurors in the hall	Total
R/O	Song	Nuevo Laredo	Veracruz	Guadalajara	Hermosillo	Mazatlán	Jurors in the hall	Total
1	"El tiempo aquel"	5	4	4	3	4	68	88
2	"Hoy por ti"	5	5	6	5	6	69	96
3	"Yo te diré"	4	5	3	4	3	63	82
4	"Culpable"	6	6	5	5	7	73	102
5	"Galopando"	4	4	6	5	4	79	102
6	"A partir de ti"	6	6	7	5	7	91	122
7	"Soy un pasado de moda"	5	7	6	4	5	84	111
8	"Creo en ti"	5	5	5	4	4	75	98
9	"Ecuación entre dos"	4	4	4	2	2	43	59
10	"El momento es hoy"	5	4	4	4	4	66	87

Detailed Vote of the second qualifying round
R/O	Song	Provincial juries					Jurors in the hall	Total
R/O	Song	Torreón	Acapulco	Puebla	Irapuato	Oaxaca	Jurors in the hall	Total
1	"Pero me amas"	3	5	4	2	2	81	97
2	"Y te daré"	5	3	3	5	3	64	83
3	"Amor de paso"	4	5	5	5	3	80	102
4	"Te digo adiós"	4	3	3	3	4	63	80
5	"Y hablando de nostalgia"	5	4	5	6	4	71	95
6	"Sólo contigo"	4	3	3	4	3	66	83
7	"Gaviota perdida"	5	5	3	7	6	82	108
8	"Tímido"	3	3	2	4	4	70	86
9	"Mi amor criticado"	6	5	5	5	5	77	103
10	"A ciegas"	3	5	6	6	6	80	106

Detailed Vote of the third qualifying round
R/O	Song	Provincial juries					Jurors in the hall	Total
R/O	Song	Mérida	León	Ciudad Juárez	Tuxtla	Monterrey	Jurors in the hall	Total
1	"Oye"	3	5	3	3	4	62	80
2	"Vamos jugando"	5	5	4	2	5	63	84
3	"Amorcito"	2	4	6	5	6	63	86
4	"Muchas gracias"	4	5	3	4	4	71	91
5	"Simplemente una mujer"	3	6	3	2	4	79	97
6	"Soñador"	4	5	4	5	4	53	75
7	"Alza tu voz"	3	4	4	3	3	73	90
8	"Con y por amor"	4	7	6	6	5	90	118
9	"Si hoy me quieres olvidar"	4	7	5	4	5	95	120
10	"Así de loco"	5	5	6	7	6	90	119

Detailed Vote of the fourth qualifying round
R/O	Song	Provincial juries					Jurors in the hall	Total
R/O	Song	Saltillo	Tepic	Reinosa	Aguascalientes	Querétaro	Jurors in the hall	Total
1	"Llueve tupido el recuerdo"	4	4	5	3	4	61	81
2	"Adonde vaya"	6	6	7	5	6	69	99
3	"Nunca, nunca"	5	4	6	4	5	81	105
4	"Siempre habrá golondrinas"'	6	3	4	2	4	89	108
5	"Pierdo"	5	5	5	5	4	85	109
6	"Suavemente"	6	5	6	5	3	86	111
7	"Dueña y señora"	4	5	5	6	4	92	116
8	"Víctima o ladrón"	5	5	7	7	6	93	123
9	"Ámame y entrégate o déjame"	4	3	6	3	5	61	82
10	"Madera en la piel"	7	7	6	6	5	77	108

=== Final ===
The ten-song final was held on Sunday 26 September 1982. After all the competing entries were performed, each of the fifteen jurors announced aloud one vote for their favourite entry.

The winner was "Con y por amor", written by Mario Molina Montes and Chamín Correa, and performed by Enrique Guzmán. The three songs with the most votes were awarded first, second, and third prize. The festival ended with a reprise of the winning entry.

Winner

Result of the final of the National OTI Festival – Mexico 1982
R/O	Song	Artist	Votes	Result
1	"Si hoy me quieres olvidar"	Arianna	3	3
2	"Suavemente"	Crystal	0	—N/a
3	"Soy un pasado de moda"	Mario Pintor	0	—N/a
4	"Víctima o ladrón"	María Medina	3	2
5	"Así de loco"	Joan Sebastian	0	—N/a
6	"A partir de ti"	Carminna	0	—N/a
7	"Siempre habrá golondrinas"	Sola	0	—N/a
8	"Con y por amor"	Enrique Guzmán	7	1
9	"Dueña y señora"	Gil Rivera	1	4
10	"Pierdo"	José Alberto Fuentes	1	4

=== Merit awards ===
In the final, the fifteen jurors voted aloud for the Best Male and Female Performer, Best Musical Arrangement, and Breakout Male, Female Artist and Duo among the three shortlisted artist in each category.

Enrique Guzmán received the Best Male Performer Award, Arianna the Best Female Performer Award, Sergio Andrade the Best Musical Arrangement Award for "Alza tu voz", Gil Rivera the Breakout Male Artist Award, María de los Ángeles the Breakout Female Artist Award, and Jerónimos the Breakout Duo Award.

Best Male Performer
Artist	Votes	Result
Enrique Guzmán	7	1
Víctor Yturbe	2	3
Johnny Laboriel	6	2

Best Female Performer
Artist	Votes	Result
Sola	3	3
Arianna	8	1
Carminna	4	2

Best Musical Arrangement
Song	Arranger	Votes	Result
"Alza tu voz"	Sergio Andrade	8	1
"A partir de ti"	Rodolfo "Popo" Sánchez	5	2
"Tímido"	Enrique Neri	2	3

Breakout Male Artist
Artist	Votes	Result
Valerio	3	2
Jesús	2	3
Gil Rivera	10	1

Breakout Female Artist
Artist	Votes	Result
Crystal	3	2
Ángeles Ochoa	3	2
María de los Ángeles	9	1

Breakout Duo
Artist	Votes	Result
Bacará	0	3
Jerónimos	8	1
Hermanos Urbán	7	2

=== Official album ===
Las 10 triunfadoras del Festival OTI 82 is the official compilation album of the eleventh edition of the Mexican National OTI Festival, released by Gamma in 1982. The vinyl LP features the studio version of the ten songs qualified for the final.

== At the OTI Festival ==
On 27 November 1982, the OTI Festival was held at the Coliseo Amauta in Lima, Peru, hosted by Panamericana Televisión, and broadcast live throughout Ibero-America. Enrique Guzmán performed "Con y por amor" in position 6, with Julio Jaramillo conducting the event's orchestra, and placing fourth with 22 points, tying with the entries from Argentina and Costa Rica, out of 21 competing entries.

=== Voting ===
Each participating broadcaster appointed a juror who awarded 5–1 points to his five favourite songs in order of preference. The Mexican juror was Raúl Velasco.

Points awarded to Mexico
Score	Country
5 points	United States
4 points	Chile; Dominican Republic; Puerto Rico
3 points	
2 points	Netherlands Antilles
1 point	Colombia; Panama; Uruguay

Points awarded by Mexico
Score	Country
5 points	Venezuela
4 points	United States
3 points	Dominican Republic
2 points	Chile
1 point	Colombia
