= El Salvador in the OTI Festival 1982 =

- OTI Festival 1982
- Participating broadcaster: Canal Cuatro
- Country: El Salvador
- Selection process: National OTI Festival

Competing entry
- Song: "Con un cuento en el bolsillo"
- Artist: Félix López
- Songwriter: Félix López

Placement
- Final result: 13th, 12 points

Participation chronology
◄1981 •	1982	• 1983►

El Salvador was represented at the OTI Festival 1982 with the song "Con un cuento en el bolsillo", written and performed by Félix López. The Salvadoran participating broadcaster, Canal Cuatro, selected its entry through a national televised competition. The song, that was performed in position 18, placed thirteenth out of 21 competing entries with 12 points. López had already represented El Salvador in 1974.

== National stage ==
Canal Cuatro held a national televised competition to select its entry for the 11th edition of the OTI Festival. This edition of the National OTI Festival featured twelve songs. It was broadcast on Canal 4.

Following each performance, each of the nine members of the jury, who were seated in the front row, scored the entry between 1 and 10 points, displaying a large board with the score.

Each of the performers received on stage a diploma of participation after their performance. The winner was "Con un cuento en el bolsillo", written and performed by Félix López; with "Déjenme cantar" placing second; and "Otra mañana" placing third. The festival ended with a reprise of the winning entry.

Winner

Result of the final of the National OTI Festival – El Salvador 1982
R/O	Song	Artist	Songwriter(s)	Points	Result
1	"Dónde están mis amigos"			53	12
2	"Hoy que estás presente"			60	7
3	"Hoy somos más"			70	4
4	"La casa de la montaña"			58	8
5	"Ven a mí"			62	5
6	"Otra mañana"			71	3
7	"Déjenme cantar"			79	2
8	"Yo no entiendo al ser humano"			62	5
9	"Eres ajena"			54	11
10	"Un canto a la vida"			55	9
11	"Yo te sigo pensando"			55	9
12	"Con un cuento en el bolsillo"	Félix López	Félix López	86	1

== At the OTI Festival ==
On 27 November 1982, the OTI Festival was held at the Coliseo Amauta in Lima, Peru, hosted by Panamericana Televisión, and broadcast live throughout Ibero-America. Félix López performed "Con un cuento en el bolsillo" in position 18, with Luis Neves conducting the event's orchestra, and placing thirteenth out of 21 competing entries with 12 points.

=== Voting ===
Each participating broadcaster, or group of broadcasters that jointly participated representing a country, appointed a juror who awarded 5–1 points to their five favourite songs in order of preference. The Salvadoran juror was Óscar Rolando Espinoza.

Points awarded to El Salvador
Score	Country
5 points	
4 points	Costa Rica; Guatemala; Honduras
3 points	
2 points	
1 point	

Points awarded by El Salvador
Score	Country
5 points	Costa Rica
4 points	Peru
3 points	Venezuela
2 points	Guatemala
1 point	Spain
