= Caballo Viejo =

Single by Simón Díaz

from the album Caballo Viejo
- Released: 1980
- Recorded: 1980
- Genre: Folk (Música Llanera)
- Length: 2:59
- Label: Palacio
- Songwriter: Simón Díaz

"Caballo Viejo" ('Old Horse') is a Venezuelan folk song of the genre Pasaje, a style of Música Llanera, written and composed by Simón Díaz, which appears on the 1980 album Golpe Y Pasaje. It has become one of the most important folk songs in Venezuela and is regarded as a classic. "Bamboléo", a potpourri by the Gipsy Kings, has some verses from Caballo Viejo, and it is also popular internationally.

== History ==
In words of Simón Díaz, the song was inspired by a visit he made to the llanos in 1980, when he was going to record a song, and he met a young women, called Maigualida, who he fell in love with. He sang to her, and ended up in a "contrapunteo", a back-and-forth exchange of verses, with a guy that was accompanying her. Simon didn't know that they were a couple at the time. The following morning, he composed Caballo Viejo inspired by that night and the verses he had dedicated to the girl.

== Versions and translations ==
The song has been translated into many different languages.

It has been recorded as "Caballo Viejo" or as "Bamboleo" by dozens of singers, such as Celia Cruz, Papo Lucca y la Sonora Ponceña, María Dolores Pradera, Julio Iglesias, Gilberto Santa Rosa, José Luis Rodríguez "El Puma", Polo Montañes, Freddy López, Oscar D'León, Celso Piña, Gipsy Kings, Ray Coniff, Rubén Blades, Roberto Torres and Plácido Domingo. Roberto Torres's cover of the song was inducted into the Latin Grammy Hall of Fame in 2007.

It was covered in Serbian language under the title "Španska kraljica" (Spanish Queen) by Eurodance group Beat Street in 1995.

== See also ==
- Music of Venezuela (Musica Llanera)
- Simón Díaz
