= Los criminales =

- Directed by: Clemente de la Cerda
- Starring: Miguel Ángel Landa; Chony Fuentes; Rafael Briceño; Alicia Plaza; Orlando Zamarrera; Otto Rodríguez; Grecia Colmenares
- Release date: 1982
- Country: Venezuela
- Language: Spanish

Los criminales is a 1982 Venezuelan film directed by Clemente de la Cerda and starring Miguel Ángel Landa, Chony Fuentes, Rafael Briceño, Alicia Plaza, Orlando Zamarrera, Otto Rodríguez.

== Plot ==
Two young men decide to rob a residence believing it to be uninhabited, while inside the house the owners of the house and another couple play a perverse game for fun on Sunday. One of the young men enters the house but is cornered and subjected to all kinds of humiliations and mistreatment.

== Cast ==
- Miguel Ángel Landa
- Chony Fuentes
- Rafael Briceño
- Alicia Plaza
- Orlando Zamarrera
- Otto Rodríguez
- Grecia Colmenares
- Domingo Del Castillo
- Dilia Waikarán
- Evelin Berroteran
- Edith Cermeño
