= María Mercé, La Chinita =

- Genre: Telenovela
- Created by: Inés Rodena
- Starring: Lila Morillo; Carlos Cámara
- Opening theme: María Mercé by José Luis Rodríguez and Lila Morillo
- Ending theme: 1968
- Country of origin: Venezuela
- Original language: Spanish

Original release
- Network: Venevisión
- Release: 1970 – 1970

Related
- Siempre habrá un mañana (1974)

María Mercé, La Chinita is a 1970 Venezuelan telenovela produced by Venevisión. The telenovela is based on the radio novela from Cuban writer Inés Rodena titled María Mercé, La Mulata. The title of the telenovela was changed from la mulata to la chinita in reference to Our Lady of the Rosary of Chiquinquirá in Maracaibo which is Lila's birthplace.

Lila Morillo, Carlos Cámara and Jorge Palacios starred as the main protagonists.

== Plot ==
María Mercé is a young and humble woman who lives in the countryside making a living as a laundress. She meets Carlos, a handsome lawyer from the capital city and they fall in love. When Carlos is about to leave for the city, he promises to come back for María Mercé. However, he meets a beautiful rich heiress from high society and out of greed for her money, marries her, forgetting all about María Mercé. Once María Mercé learns the truth, she is shattered, but will find love once again in a good man who loves her deeply.

== Cast ==
- Lila Morillo - María Mercé
- Carlos Cámara - Carlos
- Jorge Palacios - Sergio
- Agustina Martin
- Julio Capote
- María Teresa Acosta
