= OTI Festival 1982 =

11th OTI Song Festival

Date and venue
- Final: 27 November 1982
- Venue: Teatro Auditorio Amauta; Lima, Peru

Organization
- Organizer: Organización de Televisión Iberoamericana (OTI)

Production
- Host broadcaster: Panamericana Televisión
- Director: Moisés Chiok
- Musical director: Luis Neves
- Presenters: Humberto Martínez Morosini; Silvia Maccera; Pepe Ludmir

Participants
- Number of entries: 21
- Returning countries: Bolivia; Dominican Republic
- Non-returning countries: Paraguay; Portugal
- Participation map: Participating countries Countries that participated in the past but not in 1982

Vote
- Voting system: Each country awarded 5-1 points to their 5 favourite songs
- Winning song: Venezuela "Puedes contar conmigo"

The OTI Festival 1982 (Spanish: Decimoprimer Gran Premio de la Canción Iberoamericana, Portuguese: Décimo Primeiro Grande Prêmio da Canção Ibero-Americana) was the 11th edition of the OTI Festival, held on 27 November 1982 at the Teatro Auditorio Amauta in Lima, Peru, and presented by Humberto Martínez Morosini, Silvia Maccera, and Pepe Ludmir. It was organised by the Organización de Televisión Iberoamericana (OTI) and host broadcaster Panamericana Televisión.

Broadcasters from twenty-one countries participated in the festival. The winner was the song "Puedes contar conmigo", written by Luis Gerardo Tovar and Carlos Moreán, and performed by Grupo Unicornio representing Venezuela; with "Ay, ay, amor", written by Julio Seijas and Luis Gómez-Escolar, and performed by La Pequeña Compañía representing Spain, placing second; and "Qué equivocado", written and performed by Laura Hevia representing the United States, placing third.

== Location ==
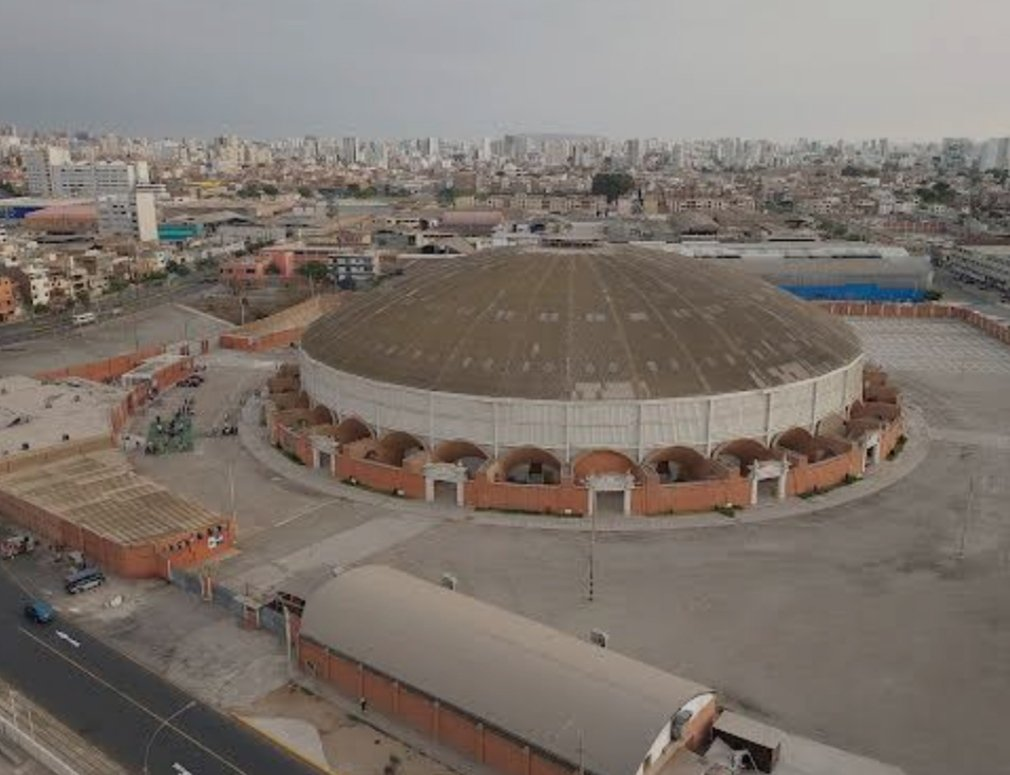
Teatro Auditorio Amauta, Lima – host venue of the OTI Festival 1982.

The Organización de Televisión Iberoamericana (OTI) designated Panamericana Televisión as the host broadcaster for the 11th edition of the OTI Festival. The broadcaster staged the event in Lima. The venue selected was the Teatro Auditorio Amauta, that is the biggest multi-use indoor arena in the country. It was opened in 1946 as an open-air bullring and in 1968 it was reopened, after being remodeled and roofed, as an enclosed venue with a total capacity for 20,000 people. In 1981, Panamericana Televisión bought the facility and used it to host large events such as Miss Universe 1982. For the festival, the venue had a capacity of 10,000 spectators, but it was not actually filled to capacity.

== Participants ==
Broadcasters from twenty-one countries participated in this edition of the OTI festival. The OTI members, public or private broadcasters from Spain and twenty Spanish and Portuguese speaking countries of Ibero-America signed up for the festival. From the countries that participated in the previous edition, Paraguay and Portugal withdrew, while Bolivia and the Dominican Republic, returned after missing that festival.

Some of the participating broadcasters, such as those representing Chile, El Salvador, Mexico, the Netherlands Antilles, and the United States, selected their entries through their regular national televised competitions. Other broadcasters decided to select their entry internally. Initially, Televisión Española (TVE) had internally selected the song "Buenas noches, papá", written by Luis Gómez-Escolar and Honorio Herrero, and performed by Carmen Pascual, as its entry representing Spain. But because the rules did not allow performers under 18 to participate, the OTI did not allow her to participate, and TVE entered the song that placed second in the internal selection to the festival instead.

Two performing artists had previously represented the same country in previous editions: Félix López had represented El Salvador in 1974, and Ricardo Padilla had represented Costa Rica in 1980.

Participants of the OTI Festival 1982
| Country | Broadcaster(s) | Song | Artist | Songwriter(s) | Language | Conductor |
|---|---|---|---|---|---|---|
| Argentina | Canal Once | "Canción para dar las gracias" | Magdalena León | Luis Gonzales | Spanish | Horacio Malvicino |
| Bolivia | TVB | "Hay un nuevo día para ti" | Raúl Menacho | Raúl Menacho | Spanish | Luis Neves |
| Brazil | SBT | "Un canto a los niños" | Júlio Cézar | Júlio Cézar; Nelson Ned | Spanish | Luis Neves |
| Chile | TVN; UCTV; UTV | "Si no hubieras estado tú" | Juan Pablo Méndez | Juan Pablo Méndez | Spanish | Francisco Aranda |
| Colombia | Caracol Televisión; PUNCH; RTI | "Así" | Blanco y Negro | Fernando Garavito | Spanish | Raúl Rosero Polo |
| Costa Rica | Telecentro; Teletica | "La mujer de mi vida" | Ricardo Padilla | Ricardo Padilla | Spanish | Luis Neves |
| Dominican Republic | Color Visión; Tele Antillas | "Por tanto amor" | Rhina Ramírez | Leonor Porcella de Brea | Spanish | Manuel Tejada |
| Ecuador | AECTV | "Aprenderé" | Andrés Kattan | Francisco Betancourt | Spanish | Ricardo Antón |
| El Salvador | Canal Cuatro | "Con un cuento en el bolsillo" | Félix López | Félix López | Spanish | Luis Neves |
| Guatemala | (Note: The Guatemalan juror was presented at the festival as the representative of all television broadcasters in Guatemala.) | "Víveme" | Sandra Patricia | Óscar Salazar | Spanish | Óscar Salazar |
| Honduras | Televisora Hondureña | "Año dos mil" | Miguel Ángel Mejía | Serafina de Milla | Spanish | Víctor Durán |
| Mexico | Televisa | "Con y por amor" | Enrique Guzmán | Mario Molina Montes; Chamín Correa | Spanish | Julio Jaramillo |
| Netherlands Antilles | ATM | "Alguien que no seas tú" | Sharon Rose | Roberto Montiel | Spanish | Roberto Montiel |
| Nicaragua | SSTV | "Te canto porque te quiero" | Deyanira Toruño | Diego Martín Aguirre | Spanish | Coco Betancourt |
| Panama | | "Mi pueblito" | Ediza Moreno | Ediza Moreno; Toby Muñoz | Spanish | Guillermo Irribarra |
| Peru | Panamericana Televisión | "El signo en la frente" | Elsa María Elejalde | Víctor Merino; Francisco García | Spanish | Víctor Cuadros |
| Puerto Rico | Canal 2 Telemundo | "Sin tu música" | Lunna | Cheo Zorrilla; Ángel "Cucco" Peña Berdiel | Spanish | Ángel "Cucco" Peña Berdiel |
| Spain | TVE | "Ay, ay, amor" | La Pequeña Compañía | Julio Seijas; Luis Gómez-Escolar | Spanish | Eddy Guerín |
| United States | SIN | "Qué equivocado" | Laura Hevia | Laura Hevia | Spanish | Héctor Garrido |
| Uruguay | Monte Carlo TV | "Hermandad" | Ana María Pascual | Nelson Rodríguez; Horacio Sosa | Spanish | Leslie Muliz |
| Venezuela | VTV | "Puedes contar conmigo" | Grupo Unicornio | Luis Gerardo Tovar; Carlos Moreán | Spanish | Carlos Moreán |

== Festival overview ==
The festival was held on Saturday 27 November 1982, beginning at 18:00 PET (23:00 UTC). It was presented by Humberto Martínez Morosini and Silvia Maccera, with Pepe Ludmir introducing the jury. The musical director was Luis Neves who conducted the orchestra when required.

The winner was the song "Puedes contar conmigo", written by Luis Gerardo Tovar and Carlos Moreán, and performed by Grupo Unicornio representing Venezuela; with "Ay, ay, amor", written by Julio Seijas and Luis Gómez-Escolar, and performed by La Pequeña Compañía representing Spain, placing second; and "Qué equivocado", written and performed by Laura Hevia representing the United States, placing third. The first prize trophy was delivered by Eduardo Orrego Villacorta, mayor of Lima; the second prize trophy by Alfredo Escobar, president of the OTI programs committee; and the third prize trophy by Ruth Fernández, president of the jury. The festival ended with a reprise of the winning entry.

Winner

Results of the OTI Festival 1982
| R/O | Country | Song | Artist | Points | Result |
|---|---|---|---|---|---|
| 1 | Bolivia | "Hay un nuevo día para ti" | Raúl Menacho | 1 | 20 |
| 2 | Honduras | "Año dos mil" | Miguel Ángel Mejía | 6 | 17 |
| 3 | Nicaragua | "Te canto porque te quiero" | Deyanira Toruño | 3 | 19 |
| 4 | Panama | "Mi pueblito" | Ediza Moreno | 11 | 14 |
| 5 | Chile | "Si no hubieras estado tú" | Juan Pablo Méndez | 14 | 11 |
| 6 | Mexico | "Con y por amor" | Enrique Guzmán | 22 | 4 |
| 7 | Brazil | "Un canto a los niños" | Júlio Cézar | 15 | 10 |
| 8 | Guatemala | "Víveme" | Sandra Patricia | 9 | 15 |
| 9 | United States | "Qué equivocado" | Laura Hevia | 25 | 3 |
| 10 | Spain | "Ay, ay, amor" | La Pequeña Compañía | 27 | 2 |
| 11 | Netherlands Antilles | "Alguien que no seas tú" | Sharon Rose | 7 | 16 |
| 12 | Argentina | "Canción para dar las gracias" | Magdalena León | 22 | 4 |
| 13 | Colombia | "Así" | Blanco y Negro | 18 | 9 |
| 14 | Dominican Republic | "Por tanto amor" | Rhina Ramírez | 20 | 7 |
| 15 | Ecuador | "Aprenderé" | Andrés Kattan | 0 | 21 |
| 16 | Costa Rica | "La mujer de mi vida" | Ricardo Padilla | 22 | 4 |
| 17 | Puerto Rico | "Sin tu música" | Lunna | 5 | 18 |
| 18 | El Salvador | "Con un cuento en el bolsillo" | Félix López | 12 | 13 |
| 19 | Uruguay | "Hermandad" | Ana María Pascual | 13 | 12 |
| 20 | Venezuela | "Puedes contar conmigo" | Grupo Unicornio | 43 | 1 |
| 21 | Peru | "El signo en la frente" | Elsa María Elejalde | 20 | 7 |

== Detailed voting results ==
For the first time, each participating broadcaster (Note: Or group of broadcasters that jointly participated representing a country.) appointed a juror, and all jurors were present in the hall. Each juror awarded 5 points its favourite song, 4 points to the second favourite, and then between 3 and 1 points for the third- to fifth-favourite songs, except for the entry representing its own country. The jurors gave their points aloud in ascending order. In the event of a tie for first place, the jurors from the countries not affected by the tie would vote to select the winning song from among the tied ones. Had the tie persisted, the president of the jury would have decided; had the president been from one of the tied countries, the vice president would have decided.

As the jurors cast their points, these were shown onscreen. At the end of the voting, the total results for all countries were displayed and read by the presenter. Inexplicably, the final tally shown did not include the points from the Honduran juror. This did not cause any subsequent complications after the proclamation of the top three places, as their positions were not affected.

Detailed voting results of the OTI Festival 1982
| | | Voting countries | | | | | | | | | | | | | | | | | | | | | Points |
| | | Bolivia | Honduras | Nicaragua | Panama | Chile | Mexico | Brazil | Guatemala | United States | Spain | Netherlands Antilles | Argentina | Colombia | Dominican Republic | Ecuador | Costa Rica | Puerto Rico | El Salvador | Uruguay | Venezuela | Peru | Points |
| Contestants | Bolivia | | 1 | | | | | | | | | | | | | | | | | | | | 1 |
| Contestants | Honduras | 2 | | 2 | | | | | | | | | | | | 2 | | | | | | | 6 |
| Contestants | Nicaragua | | 3 | | | | | | | | | | | | | | | | | | | | 3 |
| Contestants | Panama | | | | | | | | 3 | | 5 | | | | | | | 2 | | | 1 | | 11 |
| Contestants | Chile | | | | | | 2 | 3 | | 1 | | | | 3 | | 3 | | | | | | 2 | 14 |
| Contestants | Mexico | | | | 1 | 4 | | | | 5 | | 2 | | 1 | 4 | | | 4 | | 1 | | | 22 |
| Contestants | Brazil | | 5 | 4 | | | | | 2 | | | | | 4 | | | | | | | | | 15 |
| Contestants | Guatemala | | | | 4 | 1 | | 2 | | | | | | | | | | | 2 | | | | 9 |
| Contestants | United States | 4 | | | | 2 | 4 | 4 | | | 3 | 3 | | | | | 5 | | | | | | 25 |
| Contestants | Spain | | | | | | | | | 3 | | | 4 | | 5 | 5 | 3 | | 1 | 5 | | 1 | 27 |
| Contestants | Netherlands Antilles | | | | | | | | | | | | 5 | | 2 | | | | | | | | 7 |
| Contestants | Argentina | 1 | 2 | 1 | | | | | | | 4 | 5 | | 2 | | 4 | | | | 3 | | | 22 |
| Contestants | Colombia | | | | | | 1 | | | 2 | | 4 | 2 | | 1 | | | | | | 5 | 3 | 18 |
| Contestants | Dominican Republic | 3 | | | 2 | 3 | 3 | 5 | | | 2 | | | | | | 2 | | | | | | 20 |
| Contestants | Ecuador | | | | | | | | | | | | | | | | | | | | | | 0 |
| Contestants | Costa Rica | | | | | | | | 5 | | | | 1 | | 3 | | | 1 | 5 | 2 | | 5 | 22 |
| Contestants | Puerto Rico | | | | 3 | | | | | | | | | | | | | | | | 2 | | 5 |
| Contestants | El Salvador | | 4 | | | | | | 4 | | | | | | | | 4 | | | | | | 12 |
| Contestants | Uruguay | | | 5 | | | | | | | | | 3 | | | | 1 | | | | 4 | | 13 |
| Contestants | Venezuela | | | 3 | 5 | 5 | 5 | | | 4 | 1 | 1 | | 5 | | | | 3 | 3 | 4 | | 4 | 43 |
| Contestants | Peru | 5 | | | | | | 1 | 1 | | | | | | | 1 | | 5 | 4 | | 3 | | 20 |

=== Jurors ===
The twenty-one jurors were:

- Bolivia – René Noriega Martínez
- Honduras – José Jorge Villeda Toledo
- Nicaragua – Donald Aguirre
- Panama – Alfonso Amanza Serrato
- Chile – Lucho Gatica
- Mexico – Raúl Velasco
- Brazil – José Rodrigues
- Guatemala – Luis Felipe Valenzuela
- United States – Omar Marchant
- Spain – Alberto Martínez Peyrou
- Netherlands Antilles – Joy Kock
- Argentina – Ana María Arregui
- Colombia – Graciela de Rosero
- Dominican Republic – Adriano Rodríguez
- Ecuador – Mariano Merchan
- Costa Rica – Roberto López Jiménez
- Puerto Rico – Ruth Fernández (chairperson)
- El Salvador – Óscar Rolando Espinoza
- Uruguay – Walter Reyes
- Venezuela – Luis Pardi
- Peru – Luigi Alva

== Broadcast ==
The festival was broadcast in the 21 participating countries, where the corresponding OTI member broadcasters relayed the contest through their networks after receiving it live via satellite.

Known details on the broadcasts of the festival in each country, including the specific broadcasting stations and commentators are shown in the tables below.

Broadcasters and commentators in participating countries
| Country | Broadcaster | Channel(s) | Commentator(s) | Ref. |
|---|---|---|---|---|
| Argentina | Canal Once (Note: Delayed broadcast at 22:00 DST (01:00+1 UTC)) | | | |
| Chile | TVN | Canal 7 (Note: Delayed broadcast at 21:30 CLST (00:30+1 UTC)) | | |
| Chile | UTV | Canal 11 | | |
| Chile | UCTV | Canal 13 | | |
| Colombia | Inravisión (Note: Through the programadoras: Caracol Televisión, Producciones Nacionales Colombianas de Hoy (PUNCH), and Radio Televisión Interamericana (RTI).) | Primera Cadena | | |
| Costa Rica | Telecentro | Telecentro Canal 6 | | |
| Mexico | Televisa | Canal 2 (Note: Delayed broadcast at 18:00 CST (00:00+1 UTC)) | | |
| Netherlands Antilles | ATM | TeleAruba | | |
| Netherlands Antilles | ATM | TeleCuraçao (Note: Delayed broadcast at 19:30 AST (23:30 UTC)) | | |
| Peru | Panamericana Televisión | Canal 5 | | |
| Spain | TVE | TVE 1 | Miguel de los Santos | |
| United States | SIN | | | |
