= María Teresa Chacín =

Venezuelan singer

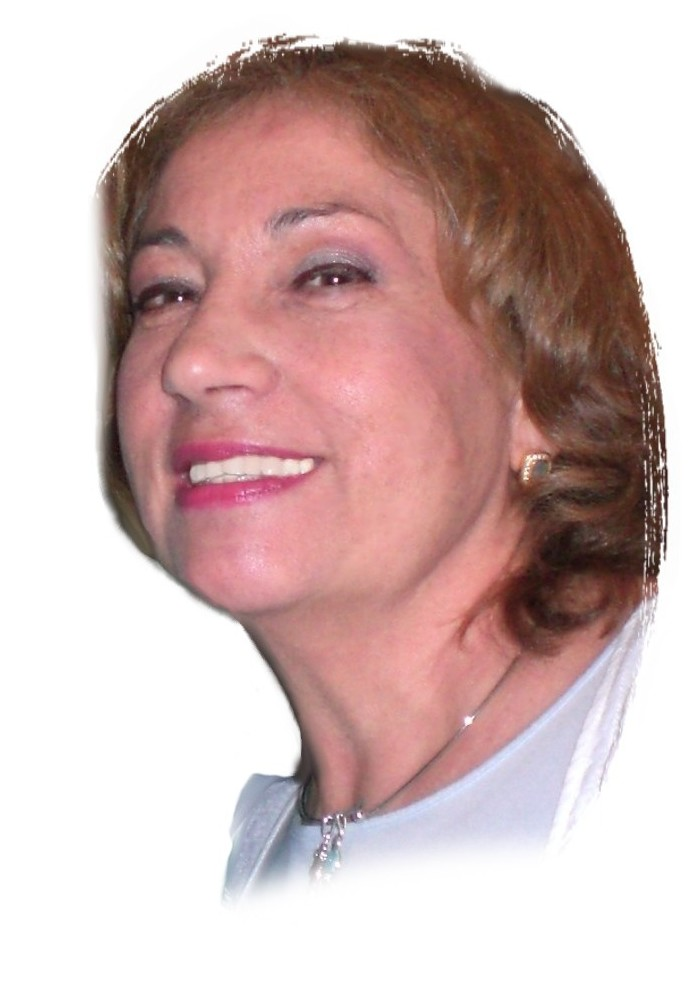

Background information
- Also known as: Matecha
- Born: January 22, 1945 (age 81); Caracas, Venezuela
- Genres: Folk, Latin
- Occupation: Singer,
- Instrument: Singing
- Years active: 1962–present

María Teresa Chacín (born January 22, 1945, in Caracas), is a Venezuelan singer. She has recorded over 50 albums. She has received honors including Latin Grammy Award for Best Latin Children's Album, Guaicaipuro de Oro, Meridiano de Oro, Cardenal de Oro, Gran Sol de Oriente, Idolo de Plata, Mara de Oro, Canaima de Oro, and the award Escenario Juvenil. She represented Venezuela in the OTI Festival 1983 with the song "Esperanza americana".

== Discography ==
- Quisiera Preguntar (1964)
- Canta Para Tí (1965)
- Todo Me Es Igual (1966)
- María Teresa & Sus Exitos (1967)
- Rosas En El Mar (1968)
- Canta con María Teresa (1969)
- La Paraulata (1970)
- Cuando Me Quieras (1971)
- Canciones Nuestras (1972)
- Romance (1973)
- Mi Querencia (1974)
- Aguinaldos Que No Se Olvidan (1974)
- Ahora (1976)
- Canción De Cuna Para Una Estrella (1977)
- Como Pequeña Gota De Rocío (1978)
- Aguinaldos Venezolanos (1978)
- En Azul, Amarillo y Rojo (1980)
- Aguinaldos Tradicionales Vol. III (1980)
- En Este País (1983)
- Tú Eres La Música (1985)
- Ojos Color De Los Pozos (1987)
- M.T. Chacín y Sus Grandes Exitos (1990)
- Yo soy venezolana (1992)
- Romántica (1994)
- Para Simón De María Teresa (1994)
- Amor Mío (1995)
- Con La Orquesta Sinfónica de Londres (1996)
- Me Lo Dijeron Tus Ojos (1996)
- Y Sus Amigos En Navidad (1997)
- Y Sus Amigos en Vivo desde el TTC (1998)
- Me Voy A Regalar (2001)
- La Historia (1970–2002) (2003)
- De Conde a Principal (2007)
- María Teresa Chacín Cuenta Cuentos (2010)
- Pasiones (2016)
