= Enrique Guzmán =

Mexican singer (born 1943)

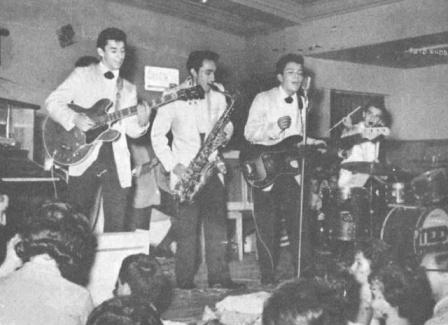
- Guzmán singing with Los Teen Tops in Argentina in 1962
- Born: Enrique Alejandro Guzmán Vargas; 1 February 1943 (age 83); Caracas, Venezuela
- Occupations: Singer; actor
- Years active: 1957–present
- Spouses: Silvia Pinal (m. 1967; div. 1976) Rosalba Welter Portes Gil (m. 1979)
- Children: 4, including Alejandra Guzmán
- Parent(s): Jaime Guzmán; Elena Vargas
- Family: Frida Sofía (granddaughter)

Enrique Alejandro Guzmán Vargas (born 1 February 1943) is a Mexican singer and actor. He is one of the pioneers of Rock & Roll in Mexico, along with César Costa, Angélica María, Johnny Laboriel and Alberto Vasquez, among others. He is also the father of Mexican singer Alejandra Guzmán by his former wife, actress and singer Silvia Pinal.

== Life and career ==
Enrique Guzmán was born in Venezuela to Mexican parents. They moved back to Mexico when Enrique was 7. He studied at the then Jesuit run Instituto Patria, then after graduation, medicine at the Universidad Nacional Autónoma de México although he did not complete his studies.

Guzmán has been a rock star in Mexico throughout the last half of the 20th century, known primarily for his translation of 1950s rock standards, such as "Jailhouse Rock", for Spanish-speaking listeners. In 1958 he joined Los Teen Tops, along with the Martínez brothers and piano player, Sergio Martel. In 1959 they debuted in the US on CBS radio, and they released their famous version of "La Plaga" (Good Golly Miss Molly). He also wrote several hits for himself "Pensaba en tí", "La Ronchita", and for other Latin stars.

He also appeared in films, such as Canta Mi Corazón in 1965. His hits include Spanish covers of "Put Your Head on My Shoulder", "Rolly Polly", "Bonnie Moronie" as well as the original "Dame Felicidad" ("Give Me Joy"). During the mid-1960s Guzmán formed a motion picture company and produced some films in Ecuador. In the late 1960s, Guzman and his wife, Silvia Pinal, starred in a television show called Silvia y Enrique.

In 1982, he won the 11th Mexican national selection for the OTI Festival with the song "Con y por amor", written by Mario Molina Montes and Chamín Correa, and went on to represent Mexico in the OTI Festival 1982, where they placed fourth. He has continued recording, including with his daughter Alejandra Guzmán, throughout the 1990s and 2000s. As with his ex-wife, his stepdaughter Sylvia Pasquel, and his daughter, he has his handprints embedded onto the Paseo de las Luminarias; he was inducted in 1983 for his work in the recording industry.

== Family life ==
His first wife was Mexican actress Silvia Pinal. Singer Alejandra Guzmán and musician Luis Enrique Guzmán are their children. He is currently married to Rosalba Welter Portes Gil, niece of actress Linda Christian and granddaughter of former Mexican president Emilio Portes Gil. They have two children together, Daniela Guzmán Welter and Enrique Guzmán Welter. Daniela has participated in theater and musicals.
