= Travelling Companion =

1979 film

- Film poster
- Directed by: Clemente de la Cerda
- Written by: Orlando Araujo; Rodolfo Santana; Clemente de la Cerda
- Starring: Toco Gómez
- Cinematography: Roberto Gómez
- Production company: Proyecto 13
- Release date: August 1979
- Country: Venezuela
- Language: Spanish
- Budget: $366,000

Travelling Companion (Spanish: Compañero de viaje) is a 1979 Venezuelan drama film directed by Clemente de la Cerda. It was entered into the 11th Moscow International Film Festival.

== Cast ==
- Toco Gómez as Nolasco
- Eduardo Calvo as Padre Parra
- María Escalona as Mujer de Rosalino
- Esperanza Roy as Rosa Benilde
- José Torres as José Rafael
- Bienvenido Roca as Coronel Vergara
- Julio Mota as Juan Crisóstomo Bodas, 'El Chueco'
- Ricardo Franco as Gabrielito
- Arturo Calderón as Tobías
- Alberto Arvelo as Pablote
- María García as Balbina
- Alfredo Medina as Rosalino Camacho
- Orlando Zarramera as Pitón de Rifle
