= Compañero Augusto =

1976 Venezuelan film

- Film poster
- Directed by: Enver Cordido
- Written by: Enver Cordido
- Starring: Orlando Urdaneta; María Grazia Bianchi; Rafael Cabrera; Jesús Maella; Julio Mota; Chelo Rodríguez
- Cinematography: Ramón Carthy
- Music by: Anibal Abren
- Release date: 1976
- Running time: 96 minutes
- Country: Venezuela
- Language: Spanish

Compañero Augusto (English: Comrade Augusto) is a 1976 Venezuelan film directed by Enver Cordido. It stars Orlando Urdaneta, María Grazia Bianchi, Rafael Cabrera, Jesús Maella, Julio Mota, and Chelo Rodríguez.

== Plot ==
Augusto Cárdenas is a former guerrilla fighter from a high-class family in Caracas who is released after four years in prison. He is reunited with his parents and wife. He returns to his city world, enjoying the luxuries that money brings him. His political ideals and the promises of struggle he made to his fellow combatants remain in memory.
