= Canta mi corazón =

- Starring: Sara García, Libertad Lamarque, Enrique Guzmán
- Release date: 1965
- Running time: 111 minute
- Country: Mexico
- Language: Spanish

Canta mi corazón ('My Heart Sings') is a 1965 Mexican film. It stars Sara García, Libertad Lamarque, Enrique Guzmán.
