= Son sabrosón: antesala de la salsa =

1999 Cuban music documentary

- Directed by: Hugo Barroso
- Release date: 1999
- Country: Cuba

Son sabrosón: antesala de la salsa is a 1999 documentary film directed by Hugo Barroso, part of the series Vengo de Cuba of Cuban music documentaries. It outlines the origins and development of son cubano, including interviews with musicians such as Celia Cruz and Roberto Torres, and musicologists such as Eloy Crespo. The documentary recounts the apocryphal origins of son cubano in the 16th century, which are known to be a 19th-century concoction.
