= Clemente de la Cerda =

Venezuelan film director

- Born: 13 October 1935; Chichiriviche, Venezuela
- Died: 13 December 1984 (aged 49); Caracas, Venezuela
- Occupations: Film director, screenwriter
- Years active: 1964-1984

Clemente Felipe de La Cerda Martin (13 October 1935 – 13 December 1984) was a film director from Venezuela. He directed one of the highest grossing Venezuelan films, Soy un delincuente (I am a criminal), in 1976. His movies were notable for their depiction of social problems.

== Early years ==
Clemente Felipe de La Cerda Martin was born in Chichiriviche, Falcón State, in 1935. Although he had no formal education, he studied at the School of Fine Arts in Caracas. Between 1962 and 1963 he attended the Venezuelan Institute of Film Studies, then directed by the actor Luis Salazar. Later, he studied theater with Humberto Orsini in the Central University of Venezuela for eight months. At the same time he began work with Televisa (later Channel 4) as an assistant cameraman, worked his way up to directing music programs and soap operas. After video tape recorder (VTR) technology appeared, he decided to leave TV movies, and started working in news and advertising, first as a cameraman and then as director.

== Director ==
He began his career as a film director with Isla de sal (Salt Island, 1964) and El rostro oculto (The Hidden Face, 1965). After these first efforts, he went to filming the self-made, self-financed and actually lost feature Sin Fin (Endless, 1971) and, with Mauricio Odremán La Carga (The Cargo, 1972 - incompleted). He also made a documentary short film named Cahuramanacas, (title formed mixing the words "Caracas" y "Humana") in 1973, who earned him a local award and gave him ideas for his next feature film.

His Soy un delincuente (I'm a Delinquent) in 1976, earned more at the box office than Jaws by Steven Spielberg. This film challenged Venezuelan cinematic traditions by questioning the material conditions and psychological assumptions of society. It established him as a leading director.

With his next film "Reincidente" (Repeat Offender) in 1977, made by request of TV producers, he achieved what became in the first sequel in national cinema. His 1979 film El Crimen del Penalista (The Crime of the Lawyer), filmed in Dominican Republic, to avoid problems with national authorities, was based on the murder of the well known lawyer Ramón Carmona Vásquez at the hands of the special task group GATO led by former head of the PTJ, Manuel Molina Gasperi.

The 1979 film Compañero de viaje (Traveling Companion) was based on the book by Orlando Araujo. The film was entered into the 11th Moscow International Film Festival. He also directed the 1980 telenovela Elizabeth.

In 1982 he directed Los Criminales (The Criminals), based on Rodolfo Santana's play, who also write the script and, two years later Retén de Catia (Catia's Jailhouse), based on a book by Gustavo Santander, under pseudonym of Juan Sebastián Aldana. Both were two strong critics of Venezuelan society and politics, well received by the audience and box-office hits, who were attacked by the media, intellectuals and high class society, because he failed to follow the rules, and to show a part of the country that they're not recognized at their own. His films were also criticized because he always based his films on the lives and troubles of ordinary people.

This lead him to direct a comedy feature film in 1984, Agua que no has de Beber (Water You Shall Not Drink), in which he continued showing the national smartness and corruption of people and institutions, with a mild tone and sense of humor. Next day after released, he died.

In 1985, a year after his death, the National Council published a book titled Clemente de la Cerda, texts, films, illustrations, which made an exhaustive study of Cerda's cinematographic work.

== Filmography ==
Year	Movie
1964	Isla de sal
1965	El rostro oculto
1971	Sin fin (Endless) - lost
1972	La Carga (The Cargo) - unfinished
1973	Cahuramanacas (Human Caracas)- documental
1976	Soy un delincuente
1977	Reincidente (Repeat Offender)
1979	El crimen del penalista (The Crime of the Lawyer)
1979	Compañero de viaje (Traveling Companion)
1982	Los criminales (The Criminals)
1984	Retén de Catia
1984	Agua que no has de beber (Comedy)
