= Mauricio Walerstein =

Mexican film director

- Born: 29 March 1945; Mexico City, Mexico
- Died: 3 July 2016 (aged 71); Mexico City, Mexico
- Occupations: Film director, screenwriter, film producer
- Years active: 1967–2014
- Children: Marcela Walerstein
- Parent: Gregorio Walerstein

Mauricio Walerstein (29 March 1945 – 3 July 2016) was a Mexican film director, screenwriter and film producer who spent much of his career in Venezuela. He directed 17 films between 1971 and 2014. His 1973 film Cuando quiero llorar no lloro, an adaptation of the novel of the same name by Venezuelan writer Miguel Otero Silva, was entered into the 8th Moscow International Film Festival. His father was Mexican film producer and screenwriter Gregorio Walerstein.

Walerstein died on 3 July 2016, at the age of 71. Prior to his death, he had been living with Venezuelan actress Marisela Berti for more than two decades; the pair had a son, actor Alejandro Walerstein.

== Selected filmography ==
- Cuando quiero llorar no lloro (1973)
- Crónica de un subversivo latinoamericano (1975)
- La empresa perdona un momento de locura (1978)
