= Soy un delincuente =

- Directed by: Clemente de la Cerda
- Starring: Orlando Zarramera, María Escalona, Chelo Rodríguez
- Cinematography: José Jiménez
- Edited by: Alcides Longa
- Music by: Miguel A. Fuster
- Release date: 1976
- Running time: 116 minutes
- Country: Venezuela
- Language: Spanish
- Box office: 6 million Bolivares (Venezuela)

Soy un delincuente (English: I Am a Criminal) is a 1976 Venezuelan film by director Clemente de la Cerda, based on the autobiography of Ramón Antonio Brizuela. The film was a blockbuster hit in Venezuela, second only to Jaws, and is considered one of the most important films in the movement called "Nuevo Cine Venezolano". Some critics suggest that this film is clearly influenced by Italian neorealism, introducing common elements such as the presence of non-professional actors and use of real streets as settings for scenes. The film won the Special Jury Prize at the Locarno International Film Festival in 1977.

== Plot ==
The film tells the story of Ramón Antonio Brizuela, who since childhood has to deal with rampant violence and the drugs, sex and petty thievery of a Caracas slum. Starting with delinquency, Ramón moves on to serious gang activity and robberies. He grows into a tough, self-confident young man who is hardened to violence. His views change when his fiancée's brother is killed in a robbery.

== Reception ==
The film was the second highest-grossing film in Venezuela for the year with a gross of 6 million Bolivares (US$1.4 million).
