= Lila Morillo =

Venezuelan actress and singer (born 1940)

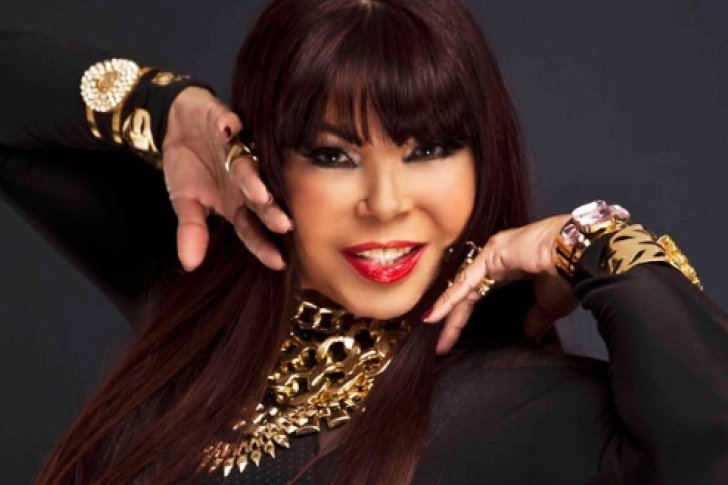
- Born: Lila Rosa Bozo Morillo; August 14, 1940 (age 86); Maracaibo, Zulia, Venezuela
- Occupations: Actress, singer
- Years active: 1955-present
- Spouse: José Luis Rodríguez "El Puma" (1965-1985)
- Children: Liliana Rodríguez; Lilibeth Morillo
- Parent(s): Silvestre de Jesús Bozo Bozo; Ana Magdalena Morillo de Bozo

Lila Morillo (born Lila Rosa Bozo Morillo on August 14, 1940 in Maracaibo, Zulia, Venezuela) is a Venezuelan actress and singer. She is popularly known as La Diva de Venezuela, La Reina del Cocotero and also as La Maracucha de Oro.

== Biography ==
Lila was born in Maracaibo. She was born to Silvestre de Jesús Bozo Bozo (1914-2013) and Ana Magdalena Morillo de Bozo (1920-2017). She moved to Caracas with her family to try her luck in show business. She made her debut in 1955 as a singer next to Mario Suárez with whom she made her first record.

In 1963 she made her acting debut in the film Isla de sal which also helped launch her music career Later, she participated in other films and also ventured into television by starring in the telenovela María Mercé, La Chinita in 1970 where she starred alongside Carlos Cámara. She obtained another starring role in the telenovela La doña produced by RCTV.

== Personal life ==
At a young age, she met José Luis Rodríguez "El Puma" who became a singer and actor himself. They got married, and the couple had two daughters Liliana Morillo and Lilibeth Morillo. In the 1970s, Lila and her husband became paparazzi fodder all the way to the 1980s, appearing on covers of multiple gossip magazines in Latin America. The couple had a highly publicized divorce in 1986 after 20 years of marriage. In 2020, she made headlines after endorsing then US president and Republican candidate Donald Trump for re-election.

== Filmography ==
=== Telenovelas ===
- Pablo y Alicia (1969)
- María Mercé, La Chinita (1970)
- La doña (1972)
- Iliana (1977)
- Macarena (1992-1993)
- Viva la Pepa (2001)
- Cosita rica (2004)

=== Film ===
- Isla de sal (1964)
