= Adita Riera =

Venezuelan actress

- Born: Ada Graciela García; 19 July 1948 (age 77); Caracas
- Occupations: Actress, announcer, model
- Years active: 1965–present
- Website: adariera.latinowebs.com

Adita Riera (born 19 July 1948, Caracas) is a Venezuelan actress, announcer, and model. She starred in several soap operas for Venevisión, the first being Lucecita with Humberto Garcia.

== Biography ==
Ada Graciela García was born to Chela D'Gar in Caracas, Venezuela. From 1954 to 1967, she studied at the La Consolacion school and graduated with a Bachelor of Science. This was followed up, from 1968 to 1972, with a degree in communications from Andrés Bello Catholic University. Riera debuted as an actress and model for Venevisión's Channel 4 in 1962. Her theater debut was a 1964 production of Blood Wedding. Three years later, Riera performed in her first soap opera, Sor Alegría. She retired from soap operas in 1980, but returned to perform in radio soap operas in 2004 and in telenovelas in 2006.
