= Simón Díaz =

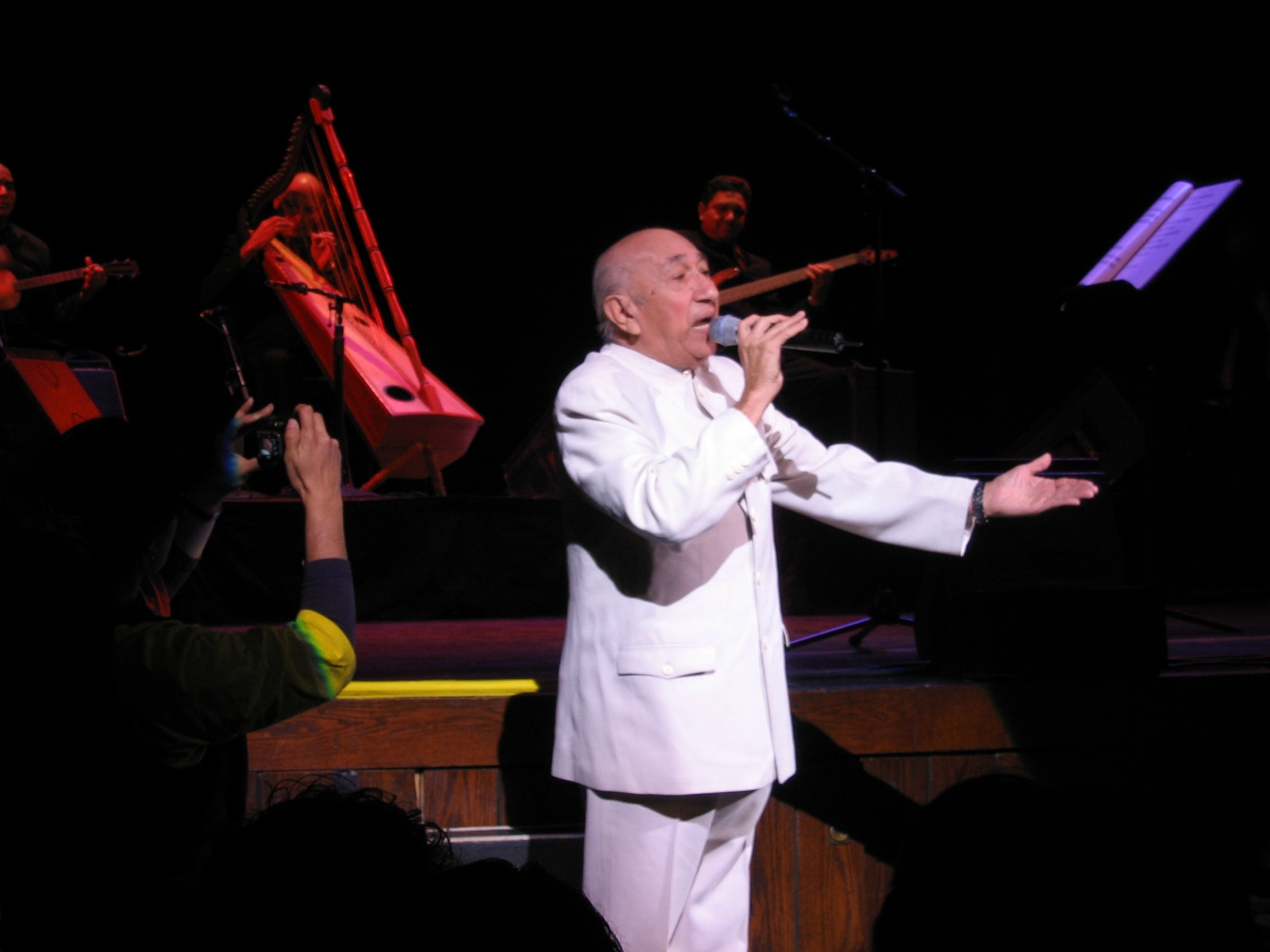
- Simón Díaz performing at Boston, Massachusetts in 2005

Background information
- Also known as: Tío Simón
- Born: Simón Narciso Díaz Márquez; August 8, 1928; Barbacoas, Aragua, Venezuela
- Died: February 19, 2014 (aged 85) Caracas, Venezuela
- Genres: Venezuelan folk music
- Occupations: Musician, singer, composer
- Years active: 1948–2007
- Website: http://www.simondiaz.com

Simón Narciso Díaz Márquez (August 8, 1928 – February 19, 2014), also known as tío Simón, was a Venezuelan singer, actor, TV host, comedian, and Grammy Award-winning composer of Venezuelan music. Some of his most popular songs include Caballo viejo, Tonada de luna llena and La vaca Mariposa.

Díaz endeavored to recover the folklore and musical traditions of the Venezuelan Llanos (plains). This style of music has since been performed by artists such as Argentina's Mercedes Sosa, Brazil's Caetano Veloso, Spain's Joan Manuel Serrat, Peru's Susana Baca, Puerto Rico's Danny Rivera, and Venezuelans Franco De Vita, Soledad Bravo, Juan Carlos Salazar, Carlos Baute and José Luis Rodríguez, among others. Many of Díaz's works have been adapted by symphonies and choral ensembles throughout Venezuela, as well as being incorporated into the orchestral and choral arrangements of conductors and composers of academic music.

Artists from other disciplines have also utilized Díaz's work. For example, German choreographer Pina Bausch included some of Díaz's songs in her work Nur Du. Film director Pedro Almodóvar included Díaz's song "Tonada de luna llena" as part of the soundtrack for his film The Flower of My Secret, sung by the Brazilian artist Caetano Veloso.

== Early life ==
He was born in Barbacoas, Guárico state (nowadays in the state of Aragua), Venezuela, to Juan Díaz and María Márquez de Díaz. He had 7 siblings, one of whom is the now deceased, actor and comedian Joselo Díaz. His father was a musician and played the cornet in a local band, and he encouraged him to play the Venezuelan cuatro as well as taught him some of the basics in music.

After his father's death in 1940, his family relocated to San Juan de los Morros, where he finished primary school and started receiving music lessons from Ramón Ziegler. In an interview, he described that in that moment, as the eldest brother, he became the “man of the house” and helped his mother raise the rest of his siblings. When he turned 15, he started working as an assistant of the local Siboney Orchestra and soon after performed as comedian under the pseudonym «el Chato».

== Career ==
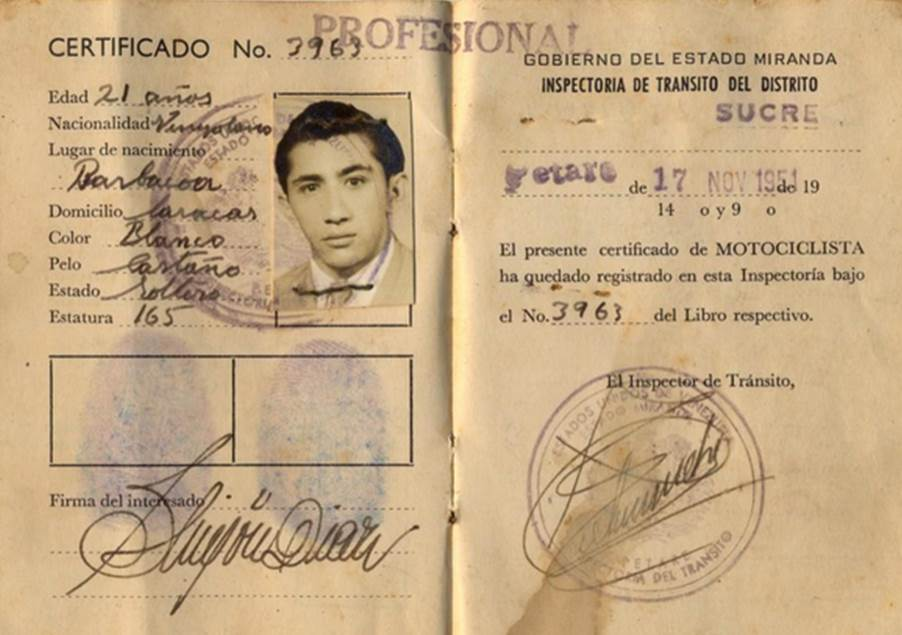
Simón Díaz's driver's license (1951)

In 1949 he started working in Caracas as a collector for the Banco Venezolano de Crédito and started receiving music lessons at the Escuela Superior de Música de Caracas. In the 1950s he gained attention as the host of El llanero, a radio show where he mixed folk music and comedy. Later on, he hosted another radio show in 70s with his brother Joselo, titled Media hora con Joselo y Simón.

In 1963 he participated as a collaborator in the album Parranda criolla, produced by Hugo Blanco. His first album as a solo artist Ya llegó Simón was released in that same year. Throughout his career he recorded over 70 records and CDs, and made innumerable performances. Díaz composed and authored the music & lyrics of "Caballo viejo", first released in 1980 (Venezuela) under the album titled "Golpe y Pasaje", Label Palacio de la Música. To date, the song has more than 300 covers from around the world. In 1987 it was recorded by the Gipsy Kings as the hit song "Bamboléo". Simón Díaz's compositions have been performed by artists such as "Roberto Torres", Plácido Domingo, Ray Conniff, Julio Iglesias, Celia Cruz, Rubén Blades, Gilberto Santa Rosa, Gipsy Kings, Ivan Lins, Joyce, Cheo Feliciano, Juan Gabriel, María Dolores Pradera, Tania Libertad, Ry Cooder and Devendra Banhart

Díaz also performed in theater, motion pictures and television. In the 1960s he became a comedian in Venezuela. He had the leading role in three plays, and participated in films such as Cuentos para mayores (1963), Isla de sal (1964), El reportero (1968), La bomba (1975), Fiebre (1976), La invasión (1977) y La empresa perdona un momento de locura (1978). He produced and hosted 12 different TV shows, all of them devised to promote Venezuelan music. One of these shows, Contesta por tío Simón, aired on Venezolana de Television for over 10 years and was devoted to teaching popular culture to children. It was during this time that Díaz's viewers began calling him "tío Simón" (uncle Simón).

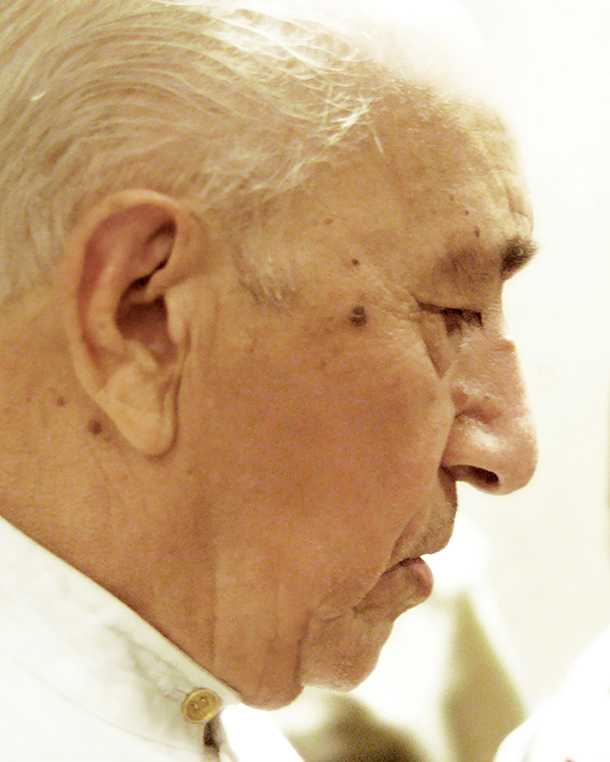
Simón Díaz

== Death ==
After battling Alzheimer's disease for many years, his daughter, Bettsimar Díaz García, announced that he died at his home in Caracas on 19 February 2014. Following his death, the Venezuelan Government announced three days of national mourning, and a concert to celebrate his life on 23 February 2014. He was buried on 21 February 2014 at the Cementerio General del Este in Caracas.

== Awards and recognition ==
Simón Díaz was awarded the highest recognition conferred by the Venezuelan state, "The Great Ribbon of the Liberator's Order". He was given honorary doctorate degrees by two major Venezuelan universities, Simón Rodríguez University and Zulia's Universidad Católica Cecilio Acosta.

The Latin American TV channel A&E MUNDO produced a documentary dedicated to Díaz under its “Biography” program, honoring his many contributions to Venezuelan culture, the program began airing in September 2004.

On September 30, 2008, the Latin Grammy Awards announced that they would honor Díaz with a Lifetime Achievement Award, (El Premio del Consejo Directivo). Díaz was awarded the 2008 Latin Recording Academy Trustees Award, presented by Venezuelan salsa singer Oscar D'León.

In 2012, he received the National Prize of Culture (Premio Nacional de la Cultura), in the category of music, by the Venezuelan Ministry of Culture for his work in Venezuelan llanos music, particularly the tonada and traditional milking songs.

== Discography ==
Serie	Title	Label	Year
LP 6124	Parranda Criolla	Palacio	1963
LP 6128	Lila + Hugo + Simón: Música de la Película "Isla de Sal"	Palacio	1963
LP 6136	¡Ya Llegó Simón!	Palacio	1963
LP 6146	De Parranda con Simón	Palacio	1964
LP 6154	Criollo y Sabroso	Palacio	1965
LP 6181	Caracha Negro	Palacio	1966
LP 6194	Gaitas y Parrandas con Simón	Palacio	1967
LP 6221	Simón En Salsa... En Gaita	Palacio	1968
LP 6253	Simón' 69	Palacio	1969
LP 6273	Artistas Venezolanos Solamente	Palacio	
LP 6275	Gaita 70	Palacio	1970
LP 6297	Simon 71	Palacio	1971
LPS 66299	Tonadas	Palacio	1974
L.P.S. 109	Navidad Criolla con el Quinto Criollo	Palacio/Guarura	1979
LPS 66333	La Gaita de las Cuñas: El Candidato Chévere ¡Vota por Él!	Palacio/H.B	1973
LPS 66345	Las Gaitas de Simón: Enemigo Público N°1	Palacio/H.B	1974
LPS 66363	Las Gaitas de Simón: Culpable?	Palacio/H.B	1975
LPS 66384	Tonadas Vol.2	Palacio	1976
LPS 66383	Las Gaitas de Simón: Cuñas, Locas, Borrachitos	Palacio/H.B	
LPS 66406	Las Gaitas de Simón	Palacio/H.B	1977
LPS 66407	Canciones Criollas Vol.3	Palacio	1978
LPS 66430	Canciones y Tonadas Vol.4	Palacio	1978
LPS 66479	Golpe y Pasaje: Caballo Viejo	Palacio	1980
LPS 66483	Música Folklórica y Popular de Venezuela en Contrapunto	Palacio	
LPS 66508	Tonadas Favoritas	Palacio	
LPS 66591	Sus Grandes Éxitos	Palacio	
LPS 2058	Amor Enguayabao	Palacio/Rodven	1993
LPS 2067	Cuenta y Canta Vol.1	Palacio	
LPS 2068	Cuenta y Canta Vol.2	Palacio	
