= La empresa perdona un momento de locura =

1978 Venezuelan film

- Film poster
- Directed by: Mauricio Walerstein
- Written by: Mauricio Walerstein; Rodolfo Santana
- Starring: Simón Díaz; Eva Mondolfi; Asdrúbal Meléndez; María Escalona; Arturo Calderón; Rafael Gómez; Fausto Verdial; Rafael Briceño; Iván Feo; Nardy Fernández; Eduardo Mancera; Hamel Meléndez; Balmore Moreno; Eduardo Cortina
- Cinematography: Hector Rios
- Music by: Alberto Slezynger
- Production company: Cinematografica Proa
- Distributed by: Proa C.A.
- Release date: 1978
- Running time: 90 minutes
- Country: Venezuela
- Language: Spanish
- Budget: $243,000

La empresa perdona un momento de locura (English: The Management Forgives a Moment of Madness) is a 1978 film directed by Mexican-Venezuelan filmmaker Mauricio Walerstein.

== Plot ==
The film follows Mariano Núñez, a faithful worker in a factory where he has served for the last 20 years. One day, he is victim of a nervous breakdown that unleashes an extremely violent and destructive attitude. He is sent to a psychiatrist to treat his condition so he can return to work, but when faced with reality he must choose between being in solidarity with his colleagues or adapting to the environment that surrounds him.

== Release ==
The film was screened for the 1979 Cannes Film Festival Directors' Fortnight (Quinzaine des Réalizateurs).
