= Orlando Urdaneta =

Venezuelan actor and television personality

- Born: October 24, 1950 (age 76); Maracaibo, Venezuela

Orlando Urdaneta (born October 24, 1950) is a Venezuelan actor and television personality. He was one of the most outspoken critics of President Hugo Chávez and his fear of retaliation from the Bolivarian Circles made him decide to live in a self-imposed exile in Miami. He worked in "La hora de Orlando" which was broadcast by La Familia Cosmovision in Miami. He currently works for Telefutura Network's nightly program "Noche de Perros."

Urdaneta received in 1997 the Premio Municipal de Teatro, awarded the best actor and the best theater actor by La Casa del Artista in 1999. During the years 1998 and 1999, he also won the award as best actor from the Asociación Nacional de Artistas Cinematográficos (ANAC) for his role in Pandemonium and Cien Años de Perdón. As co-writer of Pandemonium, he won the award for the best film screenplay by La Casa del Artista.

He has hosted over the years several TV and radio programs, such as La Rueda de la Fortuna, D'Noche, Estudio 15, Buenos Días Venezuela, Orlando con Orlando, and Almorzando con Orlando, the latter seen on Televen in 2004. Also Aquí entre nos was seen throughout Latin America and the United States. On radio, he hosted with Pedro León Zapata, a humor and political satire program entitled Pájaro que vas volando. However, it was with his programs Titulares de Mañana and La Hora de Orlando, broadcast by Globovisión, that his criticism against the policies of Hugo Chávez became more vocal. The presentation of his theater production, Orlando en Cadena was sabotaged during July 2002 by the Bolivarian Circles and some of the public was allegedly attacked.

In the 1980s he lived in the Dominican Republic. In July 2004, he decided to move to Miami, United States, with his wife, Morella Ramia, and their two daughters.

== Filmography ==
=== Films ===
Title	Director	Year
Koati	Whiskers	2021
La Mágica aventura de Óscar	Diana Sánchez	2000
Juegos bajo la luna	Mauricio Walerstein	2000
Cédula ciudadano	Diego Velasco	2000
Borrón y cuenta nueva	Henrique Lazo	2000
Manuela Sáenz	Diego Rísquez	2000
100 años de perdón	Alejandro Saderman	1998
Salserín	Luis Alberto Lamata	1997
Pandemonium	Román Chalbaud	1997
Aire libre	Luis Armando Roche	1996
Carlito's Way	Brian De Palma	1993
Vidas paralelas	Pastor Vega	1993
Móvil pasional	Mauricio Walerstein	1993
L'Aventure extraordinaire d'un papa peu ordinaire	Philippe Clair	1989
El secreto	Luis Armando Roche	1988
El compromiso	Roberto Siso	1988
Profundo	Antonio Llerandi	1988
El escándalo	Carlos Oteyza	1987
La Hora Texaco	Eduardo Barberena	1985
El atentado	Thaelman Urgelles	1985
Macho y hembra	Mauricio Walerstein	1984
La Máxima felicidad	Mauricio Walerstein	1982
Under Siege (US) / Hostages (1980 film) (UK) (Traficantes de pánico)	René Cardona Jr.	1980
Verano salvaje	Enrique Gómez Vadillo	1980
Guyana: Crime of the Century	René Cardona Jr.	1979
Esta loca, loca cámara	Mario Di Pasquale	1979
Savana - Sesso e diamanti	Guido Leoni	1978
Seagulls Fly Low (I Gabbiani volano basso)	Giorgio Cristallini	1978
El Fascista, la beata y su hija desvirgada	Joaquín Coll Espona	1978
Perro de alambre	Manuel Caño	1978
El pez que fuma	Román Chalbaud	1977
Los Tracaleros	Alfredo Lugo	1977
Compañero Augusto	Enver Cordido	1976
Canción mansa para un pueblo bravo	Giancarlo Carrer	1976
Crónica de un subversivo latinoamericano	Mauricio Walerstein	1975
Cuando quiero llorar no lloro	Mauricio Walerstein	1972

=== Telenovelas and TV appearances ===
- Noche de Perros (2011)
- Planeta de 6 (2001)
- Radio Pirata (2001)
- El País de las mujeres (1998)
- Mon enfant (Bambino mio) (1994)
- Gardenia (1990)
- La Señorita Perdomo (1982)
- La Goajirita (1982)
- Maite (1981)
- Elizabeth (1981)
- Daniela (1978)
- La Fiera (1978)
- La Zulianita (1977)
- La Mujer prohibida (1973)
- La Loba (1973)
- Peregrina (1973)
- Lucecita (1972)
- Corazón de madre (1969)
- Sacrificio (1967)

== Theater ==
- "Orlando en Cadena"
- "Divorciarme yo"
- "Don Juan", directed by Antonio Constante
- "Los Hombros de América", directed by José Ignacio Cabrujas
- "Cartas de amor", directed by Miriam Dembo
- "Pares y Nines", directed by Fausto Verdial
