= Coliseo Amauta =

Indoor arena in Lima, Peru

Coordinates: 12°03′16.52″S 77°03′47.56″W

Centro de Convenciones Agua Viva
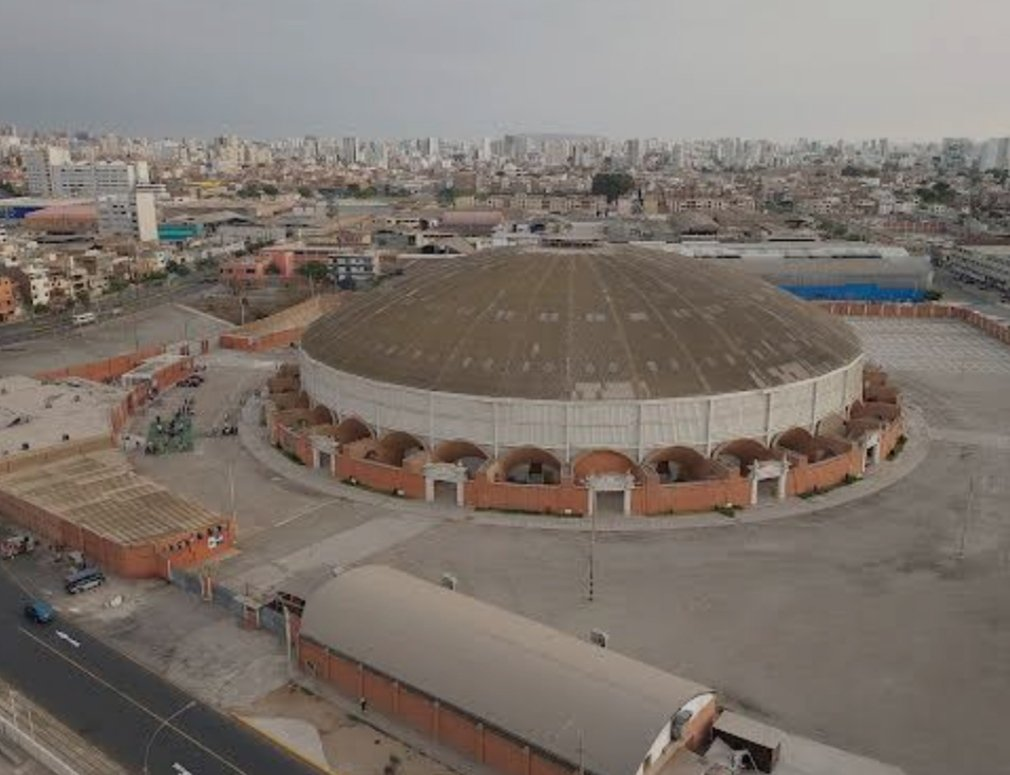
- Interactive map of Centro de Convenciones Agua Viva
- Former names: Plaza Monumental of Chacra Ríos (1946–1968); Coliseo Amauta (1968–2012)
- Address: Av. Naciones Unidas con Av. Arica; Lima 15081; Peru
- Location: Cata, Breña
- Owner: Comunidad Cristiana Agua Viva
- Capacity: 20,000

Construction
- Opened: 14 February 1946
- Renovated: 1967–1968, 2011–2012

Centro de Convenciones Agua Viva (formerly known as Coliseo Amauta) is a multi-use indoor arena in Peru, located in the southern zone of the Lima District in Lima, Peru. The arena has a capacity for 20,000 people, which can vary depending on use. It originally opened in 1946. Until the construction of Arena 1 in 2022, it was Peru's largest indoor arena.

It is the largest covered arena in Peru, today it is being renovated by its current owner, Agua Viva Church. In the past it hosted events such as a Soda Stereo concert in 1987, and it was the home of the children's TV program Nubeluz, who used the arena for the broadcasting of the show until 1995 when they moved to Panamericana Television studios in Santa Beatriz.

== Events ==
The arena hosts sport events as basketball and volleyball. Today is a venue used for evangelical megachurches events.

In 1982, Amauta Coliseum was the site of three big events including the Miss Universe 1982 on July 26; the Women's World Championship of Volleyball, from September 12 to September 25); and the OTI Festival 1982, on November 27.

== Concerts ==
- Indochine played 4 nights in April and May 1988 in front of 48,000 people
- Soda Stéreo
- Menudo
- Arena Hash
- G.I.T.
- Enrique Iglesias
- Ricky Martin
- Rafaella Carra

Preceded by Minskoff Theater (United States) New York City	Miss Universe venue 1982	Succeeded by Kiel Auditorium (United States) St. Louis, MO
