= Costa Rica in the OTI Festival 1998 =

- OTI Festival 1998
- Participating broadcaster: Televisora de Costa Rica (Teletica)
- Country: Costa Rica
- Selection process: National OTI Festival
- Selection date: 12 October 1998

Competing entry
- Song: "Vendiendo ilusiones"
- Artist: Ana Yancy Contreras and Luis Duvalier Quirós
- Songwriter: Edwin Bonillas Rojas

Placement
- Semi-final result: Automatic qualified
- Final result: Finalist

Participation chronology
◄1997 •	1998	• 2000►

Costa Rica was represented at the OTI Festival 1998 with the song "Vendiendo ilusiones", written by Edwin Bonillas Rojas, and performed by Ana Yancy Contreras and Luis Duvalier Quirós. The Costa Rican participating broadcaster, Televisora de Costa Rica (Teletica), selected its entry through a televised national final. In addition, Representaciones Televisivas (Repretel) was the host broadcaster and staged the event at the Teatro Nacional in San José. The song, which qualified automatically from the semi-final, was one of the finalists.

== National stage ==
Televisora de Costa Rica (Teletica) held a national final to select its entry for the 27th edition of the OTI Festival.

=== Competing entries ===
The broadcaster opened a song application period with a deadline of 15 September 1998, which had to be extended until 18 September. Of the 87 songs received, seven were shortlisted for the televised final. The selection committee was composed of Alfredo Moreno, Ricardo Sáenz, Willy Flores, Alexis Gamboa, José Bustos, Carlos Escalante, Mario Campos, and Rodrigo Maffioli. They considered three factors for the selection: composition, performance, and good arrangements.

Competing entries on the National OTI Festival – Costa Rica 1998
Song	Artist	Songwriter(s)
"Como un jilguero"	Alfredo Flores Villegas	Eduardo Simón; Orlando Bertarini
"Yo te miro"	Eduardo Alonso Vargas	Alejandro Pérez
"Mujer"	Javier Orias	Javier Orias
"Amores pasajeros"	Bernal Gutiérrez	Bernal Gutiérrez
"Sentimiento puro"	Natalia Ramírez	Natalia Ramírez
"Solo por la esperanza"	José Francisco Castro	José Francisco Castro
"Vendiendo ilusiones"	Ana Yancy Contreras and Luis Duvalier Quirós	Edwin Bonillas Rojas

=== National final ===
Teletica held the National OTI Festival on Monday 12 October 1998, beginning at 20:20 CST (02:20+1 UTC), at El Greco hall of the San José Palacio Hotel in San José. It was hosted by Leonardo Perucci and Lucía Alvarado; and was broadcast on Canal 7. Groups Gaviota, Claroscuro, and Merecumbé made guest performances.

The jury was composed of Alberto Zúñiga, Luis Ángel Castro, Willie Flores, Pigo Maffioli, Marvin Araya, and Mario Campos. Before the event, the jury disqualified the song "Como un jilguero" because its composers had informed the competition organizers that they were going to register it in another contest.

The winner was the song "Vendiendo ilusiones", written by Edwin Bonillas Rojas, and performed by Ana Yancy Contreras and Luis Duvalier Quirós.

Winner

Result of the National OTI Festival – Costa Rica 1998
R/O	Song	Artist	Result
1	"Yo te miro"	Eduardo Alonso Vargas	—N/a
2	"Mujer"	Javier Orias	—N/a
3	"Amores pasajeros"	Bernal Gutiérrez	—N/a
4	"Sentimiento puro"	Natalia Ramírez	—N/a
5	"Solo por la esperanza"	José Francisco Castro	—N/a
6	"Vendiendo ilusiones"	Ana Yancy Contreras and Luis Duvalier Quirós	1

== At the OTI Festival ==
On 13–14 November 1998, the OTI Festival was held at the Teatro Nacional in San José, hosted by Representaciones Televisivas (Repretel), and broadcast live throughout Ibero-America. As the host country, Costa Rica had a guaranteed place in the final; where Ana Yancy Contreras and Luis Duvalier Quirós performed "Vendiendo ilusiones" in position 4, with Carlos Guzmán conducting the event's orchestra. At the end, only the top three places were announced, and the Costa Rican entry was not one of them, remaining with the title of finalist.

Repretel broadcast both shows of the festival live on Canal 6 and Canal 9.
