= Costa Rica in the OTI Festival 1997 =

- OTI Festival 1997
- Participating broadcaster: Representaciones Televisivas (Repretel)
- Country: Costa Rica
- Selection process: National OTI Festival
- Selection date: 19 September 1997

Competing entry
- Song: "La hora cero"
- Artist: Erick León
- Songwriter: Mario Campos Sandoval

Placement
- Semi-final result: Qualified
- Final result: 2nd

Participation chronology
| ◄1996 • | 1997 | • 1998► |

Costa Rica was represented at the OTI Festival 1997 with the song "La hora cero", written by Mario Campos Sandoval, and performed by Erick León. The Costa Rican participating broadcaster, Representaciones Televisivas (Repretel), selected its entry through a televised national final. The song, qualified from the semi-final, was performed in position 8 in the final, placing second.

== National stage ==
Representaciones Televisivas (Repretel) held a national final to select its entry for the 26th edition of the OTI Festival.

=== Competing entries ===
The broadcaster opened a song application period between 1 and 31 July 1997. Of the 173 songs received, ten were shortlisted on 5 August for the televised final. The selection committee was composed of Álvaro Esquivel, Sandra Solano, Mario Jinesta, Luis Cárdenas, Ronald Hidalgo, Alexis Gamboa, Orlando Bertarini, and Juan Carlos Mena. The song "Preciso de tu amor", written and performed by Geovani Barrantes, ultimately did not participate in the final, reducing the number of entries to nine.

Competing entries on the National OTI Festival – Costa Rica 1997
| Song | Artist | Songwriter(s) |
|---|---|---|
| "Brilla el sol" | Michael J. Marcks | Michael J. Marcks |
| "Cántale a la vida" | Duvalier Quirós | Henry Mejía Pacheco |
| "Déjame ser tu amante" | Edwin Bonilla Rojas | Edwin Bonilla Rojas |
| "Estás aquí" | Manuel Fallas | Gonzalo Barrantes |
| "La hora cero" | Erik León | Mario Campos |
| "No puedo retenerte" | Grace Abarca | Felipe Contreras; Luis Abarca; Alfredo Brenes |
| "Prisionero de tu amor" | Luis Fernando Piedra | Luis Fernando Piedra; Elvis Porras; William Porras |
| "Sigue adelante" | Rosa María Solís | Ronald Solís Gamboa |
| "Tu aroma" | William Núñez | Álvaro Soto Lamas |
| "Preciso de tu amor" ◇ | Geovani Barrantes ◇ | Geovani Barrantes ◇ |

=== National final ===
Repretel held the National OTI Festival on Friday 19 September 1997, beginning at 20:00 CST (02:00+1 UTC), at El Greco hall of the San José Palacio Hotel in San José. It was hosted by Verónica Bastos and René Barboza; and was broadcast live on Canal 6 and Canal 11. The price of the admission ticket was ₡2,500, and 30 percent of the funds raised that night were allocated to a charity campaign.

The stage setting evoked the Roman era. The jury was composed of Ángela Cordero, Juan Carlos Mena, Héctor Carranza, Adrián Goizueta, and Orlando Bertarini. The musical arrangements were made by Álvaro Esquivel. Duo Abracadabra and group Pura Vida made guest performances.

The winner was the song "La hora cero", written by Mario Campos, and performed by Erik León; with "No puedo retenerte", composed by Luis Abarca and Alfredo Brenes, with lyrics by Felipe Contreras, and performed by Grace Abarca placing second; and "Brilla el sol" written and performed by Michael J. Marcks placing third. The festival ended with a reprise of the winning entry.

Winner

Result of the National OTI Festival – Costa Rica 1997
| R/O | Song | Artist | Result |
|---|---|---|---|
| 1 | "Tu aroma" | William Núñez | —N/a |
| 2 | "Déjame ser tu amante" | Edwin Bonilla Rojas | —N/a |
| 3 | "Prisionero de tu amor" | Luis Fernando Piedra | —N/a |
| 4 | "Estás aquí" | Manuel Fallas | —N/a |
| 5 | "No puedo retenerte" | Grace Abarca | 2 |
| 6 | "Cántale a la vida" | Duvalier Quirós | —N/a |
| 7 | "La hora cero" | Erik León | 1 |
| 8 | "Brilla el sol" | Michael J. Marcks | 3 |
| 9 | "Sigue adelante" | Rosa María Solís | —N/a |

== At the OTI Festival ==
On 24–25 October 1997, the OTI Festival was held at Plaza Mayor in Lima, Peru, hosted by Compañía Peruana de Radiodifusión (CPR), and broadcast live throughout Ibero-America. Erik León performed "La hora cero" in the semi-final, with Álvaro Esquivel conducting the event's orchestra, and qualifying for the final. At the end, the song placed second in the final.

Repretel broadcast the final of the festival live on Canal 6 and Canal 9.
