= OTI Festival 1997 =

26th OTI Song Festival

Dates and venue
- Semi-final: 24 October 1997
- Final: 25 October 1997
- Venue: Plaza Mayor; Lima, Peru

Organization
- Organizer: Organización de Televisión Iberoamericana (OTI)
- Host broadcaster: Compañía Peruana de Radiodifusión (CPR)
- Musical director: Víctor Salazar
- Presenters: Jorge Beleván; Claudia Doig

Participants
- Number of entries: 22
- Number of finalists: 10
- Participation map: Finalist countries Countries eliminated in the semi-final Countries that participated in the past but not in 1997

Vote
- Voting system: The members of a single jury selected their favourite songs in a secret vote
- Winning song: Mexico "Se diga lo que se diga"

The OTI Festival 1997 (Spanish: Vigésimo Sexto Gran Premio de la Canción Iberoamericana, Portuguese: Vigésimo Sexto Grande Prêmio da Canção Ibero-Americana) was the 26th edition of the OTI Festival. It consisted of a semi-final on 24 October and a final on 25 October 1997, held at Plaza Mayor in Lima, Peru, and presented by Jorge Beleván and Claudia Doig. It was organised by the Organización de Televisión Iberoamericana (OTI) and host broadcaster Compañía Peruana de Radiodifusión (CPR).

Broadcasters from twenty-two countries participated in the festival. The winner was the song "Se diga lo que se diga", written by Francisco Curiel and José Manuel Fernández, and performed by Iridián representing Mexico; with "La hora cero", written by Mario Campos Sandoval, and performed by Erick León representing Costa Rica, placing second; and "Como humo de tabaco", written by Santiago Vargas, and performed by Dúo La Plata representing Spain, placing third.

== Location ==
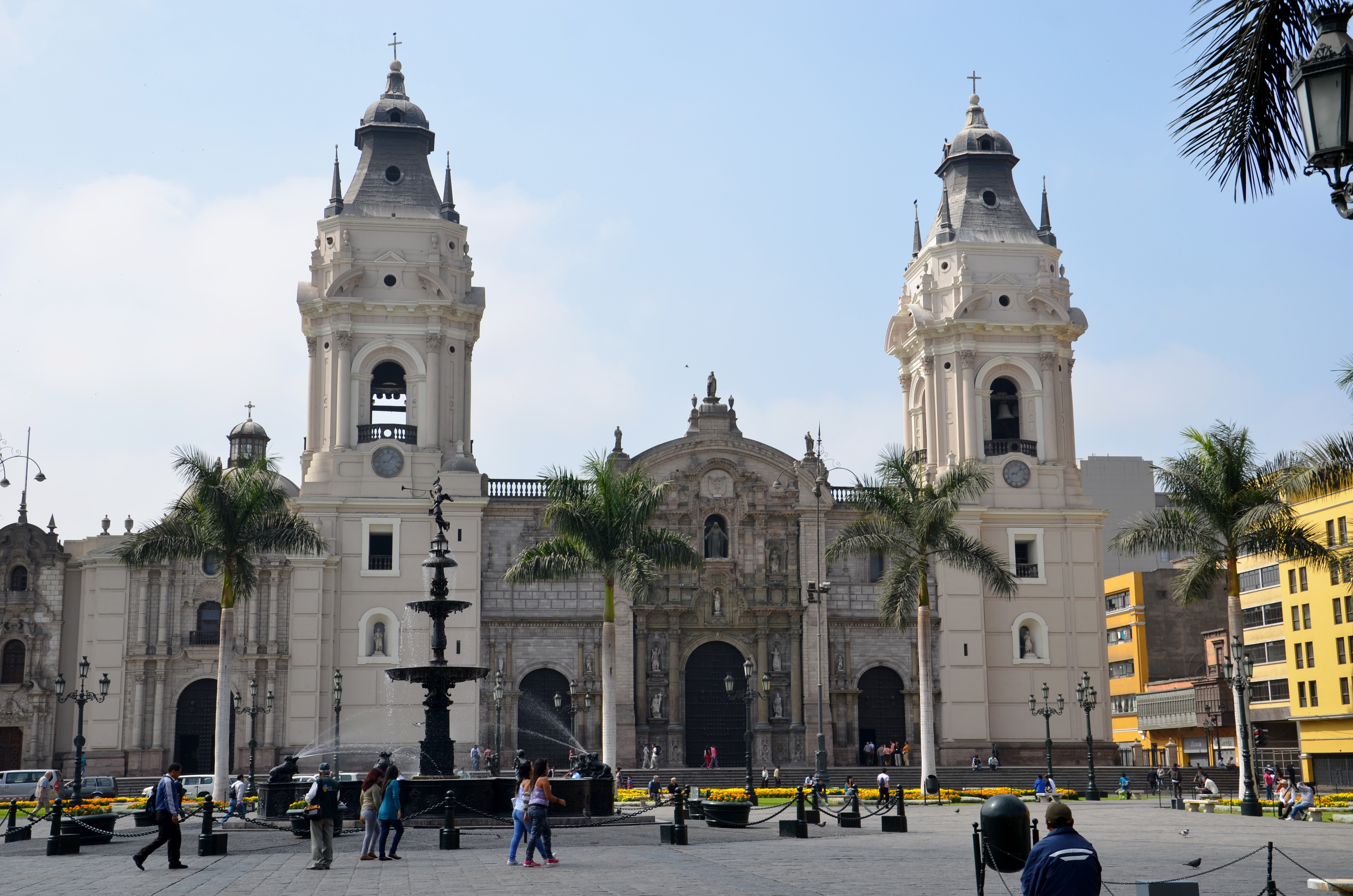
Plaza Mayor, Lima – venue of the OTI Festival 1997.

The Organización de Televisión Iberoamericana (OTI) designated the Compañía Peruana de Radiodifusión (CPR) as the host broadcaster for the 26th edition of the OTI Festival. The broadcaster staged the event in Lima. The location selected was Plaza Mayor that is the main public square of the historic centre of the city. This was the second time the festival was held outdoors, being the first the 1995 edition.

== Participants ==
Broadcasters from twenty-two countries participated in this edition of the OTI festival. The OTI members, public or private broadcasters from Spain, Portugal, and twenty Spanish and Portuguese speaking countries of Ibero-America signed up for the festival. All the countries that participated the previous edition returned.

Some of the participating broadcasters, such as those representing Chile, Costa Rica, Cuba, Ecuador, El Salvador, and Mexico, selected their entries through their regular national televised competitions. Other broadcasters decided to select their entry internally.

Participants of the OTI Festival 1997
Country	Broadcaster(s)	Song	Artist	Songwriter(s)	Language	Conductor
Argentina		"Sin tu mitad"	Raúl Lavié	E. Blásquez; S. Consentino	Spanish	Víctor Salazar
Bolivia		"El lugar donde te amé"	Grissel Bolívar Vallejo	Huáscar Bolívar Vallejo	Spanish	Huáscar Bolívar Vallejo
Chile	TVN; UCTV; CHV; Megavisión	"Nunca sabrás cuánto te amo"	Rachel	Alejandro Afani	Spanish	René Calderón
Colombia		"Mis amigos"	Andrés Cabas		Spanish	
Costa Rica	Repretel	"La hora cero"	Erick León	Mario Campos Sandoval	Spanish	Álvaro Esquivel
Cuba	ICRT	"Golondrina"	Tania Tania	Samuel Concepción	Spanish	Víctor Salazar
Dominican Republic		"El amor que tuve"	Audrey Campos	Manuel Jiménez	Spanish	Manuel Tejada
Ecuador		"Te quiero"	Luis Caicedo		Spanish	Claudio Jácome Harb
El Salvador	TCS	"Cantándole a la vida"	Rafael Alfaro	Rafael Alfaro	Spanish	Víctor Salazar
Guatemala		"Inocencia perdida"	Francisco Calvillo	Fernando Scheel	Spanish	Roberto Estrada
Honduras		"¿Dónde está el amor?"	Tony Castellanos		Spanish	
Mexico	Televisa	"Se diga lo que se diga"	Iridián	Francisco Curiel; José Manuel Fernández	Spanish	Pedro Alberto Cárdenas
Nicaragua		"Minuto a minuto"	Keyla		Spanish	
Panama		"¿De qué nos vale?"	Ricardo y Alberto		Spanish	
Paraguay		"Las cuentas claras"	Cecilia Kunert	Augusto Barreto	Spanish	Oscar Cardozo Ocampo
Peru	CPR	"Un lugar sin fronteras"	Fabiola de la Cuba	A. Aguirre	Spanish	Víctor Salazar
Portugal	RTP	"Abandonada"	Ágata	Ricardo; J. Félix; Ágata	Portuguese	Víctor Salazar
Puerto Rico	Telemundo Puerto Rico	"Almas solas"	Ángel Joel Peña	Héctor Rossi; Ángel Joel Peña	Spanish	Ángel "Cucco" Peña Berdiel
Spain	TVE	"Como humo de tabaco"	Dúo La Plata	Santiago Vargas	Spanish	Víctor Salazar
United States	Univision	"Piel de azúcar"	Luis Damón	Jorge Luis Piloto	Spanish	Víctor Salazar
Uruguay	Sociedad Televisora Larrañaga	"Sin tu amor"	Javier Fernández	Carlos Fernández	Spanish	Julio Frade
Venezuela		"Nada igual que tu amor"	Félix Valentino	Félix Valentino	Spanish	Alejandro Salas

== Festival overview ==
The festival consisted of a semi-final on Friday 24 October and a final on Saturday 25 October 1997, beginning at 20:00 PET (01:00+1 UTC). It was presented by Jorge Beleván and Claudia Doig. The musical director was Víctor Salazar, who conducted the 60-piece orchestra when required. The twenty-two participating entries were performed in the semi-final, of which only ten advanced to the final, with Peru having a guaranteed place in the final as the host country. The stage featured a large colorful backdrop in the semi-final, which was removed for the final, revealing the water fountain and the Metropolitan Cathedral behind it. The final featured a guest performance by Chayanne.

The winner was the song "Se diga lo que se diga", written by Francisco Curiel and José Manuel Fernández, and performed by Iridián representing Mexico; with "La hora cero", written by Mario Campos Sandoval, and performed by Erick León representing Costa Rica, placing second; and "Como humo de tabaco", written by Santiago Vargas, and performed by Dúo La Plata representing Spain, placing third. The festival ended with a reprise of the winning entry.

Winner

Results of the final of the OTI Festival 1997
R/O	Country	Song	Artist	Place
2	Chile	"Nunca sabrás cuánto te amo"	Rachel	—N/a
3	Paraguay	"Las cuentas claras"	Cecilia Kunert	—N/a
8	Costa Rica	"La hora cero"	Erick León	2
	Argentina	"Sin tu mitad"	Raúl Lavié	—N/a
	Cuba	"Golondrina"	Tania Tania	—N/a
	Dominican Republic	"El amor que tuve"	Audrey Campos	—N/a
	Mexico	"Se diga lo que se diga"	Iridián	1
	Peru	"Un lugar sin fronteras"	Fabiola de la Cuba	—N/a
	Spain	"Como humo de tabaco"	Dúo La Plata	3
	Venezuela	"Nada igual que tu amor"	Félix Valentino	—N/a

=== Jury ===
The members of a single jury selected their favourite songs in a secret vote. In the final only the top three places were revealed. The members of the jury were:

- Los del Río – singer-songwriters
- Yuri – singer, represented Mexico in 1984
- Delia Fiallo – screenwriter
- Kike Santander – songwriter
- Mariela Alcalá – singer
- Luis Aguilé – singer-songwriters
- Jordi Gómez Llunas – singer
- Claudia Dopft – Miss Peru 1997

== Broadcast ==
The festival was broadcast in the 22 participating countries where the corresponding OTI member broadcasters relayed the contest through their networks after receiving it live via satellite.

Known details on the broadcasts in each country, including the specific broadcasting stations and commentators are shown in the tables below.

Broadcasters and commentators in participating countries
Country	Broadcaster	Channel(s)	Show(s)	Commentator(s)	Ref.
Costa Rica	Repretel	Canal 6	Final		
Costa Rica	Repretel	Canal 9	Final		
Peru	CPR	América Televisión	All shows		
Spain	TVE	La Primera	All shows	José Luis Uribarri	
