= Costa Rica in the OTI Festival =

- OTI Festival
- Participating broadcaster: Televisora de Costa Rica (Teletica); Corporación Costarricense de Televisión (Telecentro) (Note: Latter Representaciones Televisivas (Repretel))

Participation summary
- Appearances: 24
- First appearance: 1976
- Last appearance: 2000
- Highest placement: 2nd in 1997
- Host: 1998
- Participation history: 1976; 1977; 1978; 1979; 1980; 1981; 1982; 1983; 1984; 1985; 1986; 1987; 1988; 1989; 1990; 1991; 1992; 1993; 1994; 1995; 1996; 1997; 1998; 2000

The participation of Costa Rica in the OTI Festival began at the fifth OTI Festival in 1976. The Costa Rican participating broadcasters were Televisora de Costa Rica (Teletica) and Corporación Costarricense de Televisión (Telecentro) (latter Representaciones Televisivas (Repretel)), which were members of the Organización de Televisión Iberoamericana (OTI) and participated jointly –or in turn– in the event. They participated in all twenty-four editions after their debut. Their best result in the festival was second achieved in 1997. Repretel hosted the event in 1998.

== History ==
The first Costa Rican entry in the festival was "Patria" by Felix Ángel in 1976 which placed 13th, scoring only two points. Since its debut. Costa Rica never managed to win the festival but it enjoyed some successes. In 1980, "El amor se va" by Ricardo Padilla achieved fourth place scoring 29 points. Two years later in 1982, the same singer returned to the event, again placing fourth with the song "La mujer de mi vida". In 1977, "La hora cero" by Erick León recorded Costa Rica's highest place ever, placing second. In 1986, "Bendito seas, varón" by Cristina Gutiérrez placed third.

Representaciones Televisivas (Repretel) staged the OTI Festival 1998 at Teatro Nacional in San José. The stage was dark colored with a blue floor. The orchestra zone was in the background.

== Participation overview ==
Table key
2	Second place
F	Finalist
SF	Semi-finalist
◇	Contest cancelled

Year	Song	Artist	Songwriter(s)	Conductor	Place	Points
1976	"Patria"	Félix Ángel Lobo			13	2
1977	"Melodía de los amantes"	Manuel Chamorro	Manuel Chamorro	Jonathán Zarzosa	17	0
1978	"Nunca hacia atrás"	Fernando Vargas	Waldo	Juan Azúa	13	3
1979	"Vivamos hoy"	Claudia	Flory Navarrete Ortiz; Paco Navarrete	Benjamín Gutiérrez	18	2
1980	"El amor se va"	Ricardo Padilla	Ricardo Padilla	Roberto Prais	4	29
1981	"Cantaré"	Juan Carlos Wong G.	Linnette Madrigal; Luis Marín		15	8
1982	"La mujer de mi vida"	Ricardo Padilla	Ricardo Padilla	Luis Neves	4	22
1983	"Gracias amor"	Manuel Chamorro	Manuel Chamorro	Carlos Guzmán	—N/a	
1984	"Para el ciego del acordeón"	Álvaro Esquivel	Álvaro Esquivel	Carlos Guzmán	—N/a	
1985	"Dama y caballero"	Edgar Eduardo Vega	Rodolfo Emilio Morales	Carlos Guzmán	—N/a	
1986	"Bendito seas, varón"	Cristina Gutiérrez	Rodolfo Morales	Carlos Guzmán	—N/a	
1987	"Soy de un país que ama"	Hilda Chacón Mata	Hilda Chacón Mata	Álvaro Esquivel Valverde	—N/a	
1988	"Hoy le canto al mundo"	Frank Victory	Frank Victory; Ricardo Sáenz	Rodrigo Sáenz	10	2
1989	"Denme una guitarra"	Allan McPherson	Allan McPherson		—N/a	
1990	"Promesa de amor"	Alejandro Ulate	Ricardo Padilla	Álvaro Esquivel	—N/a	
1991	"Todos es para ti"	Angelus	Jose Alberto González Trueque; Jorge Castro Ruiz; Aldondo Castillo; Rodolfo González	Jorge Castro Ruiz	F	—N/a
1992	"Igual que una mujer enamorada"	Rodolfo González	Álvaro Esquivel		—N/a	
1993	"Yo soy América"	Luis Fernando Piedra	Elvis Porras; Marisa Porras; Luis Fernando Piedra	William Porras	—N/a	
1994	"Como vino... se fue"	Ricardo Padilla	Ricardo Padilla		SF	—N/a
1995	"El buen Felipe"	Rafael F. Dubón	Rafael F. Dubón	Carlos Guzmán	—N/a	
1996	"Qué bonito sería"	Sergio Coto	Carlos Guzmán		—N/a	
1997	"La hora cero"	Erick León	Mario Campos Sandoval	Álvaro Esquivel	2	—N/a
1998	"Vendiendo ilusiones"	Ana Yancy Contreras and Luis Duvalier Quirós	Edwin Bonillas Rojas	Carlos Guzmán	F	—N/a
1999	Contest cancelled ◇					
2000	"Como la marea"	Hernán Corao and Luis Fernando Piedra	Luis Fernando Piedra	Willliam Porras	F	—N/a

== Hosting ==
Year	City	Venue	Hosts	Ref.
1998	San José	Teatro Nacional	Maribel Guardia; Rafael Rojas	
