= Chile in the OTI Festival 1997 =

- OTI Festival 1997
- Participating broadcasters: Televisión Nacional de Chile (TVN); Corporación de Televisión de la Universidad Católica de Chile (UCTV); Red de Televisión Chilevisión (CHV); Red Televisiva Megavisión
- Country: Chile
- Selection process: Hágase famoso
- Selection date: 13 October 1997

Competing entry
- Song: "Nunca sabrás cuánto te amo"
- Artist: Rachel
- Songwriter: Alejandro Afani

Placement
- Semi-final result: Qualified
- Final result: Finalist

Participation chronology
◄1996 •	1997	• 1998►

Chile was represented at the OTI Festival 1997 with the song "Nunca sabrás cuánto te amo", written by Alejandro Afani, and performed by Rachel. The Chilean participating broadcasters, Televisión Nacional de Chile (TVN), Corporación de Televisión de la Universidad Católica de Chile (UCTV), Red de Televisión Chilevisión (CHV), and Red Televisiva Megavisión, selected their entry through a special episode of Megavisión's regular talent show Hágase famoso. The song, qualified from the semi-final, was performed in position 2 in the final and was not among the top-three places revealed at the end.

== National stage ==
Televisión Nacional de Chile (TVN), Corporación de Televisión de la Universidad Católica de Chile (UCTV), Red de Televisión Chilevisión (CHV), and Red Televisiva Megavisión, selected their entry for the 26th edition of the OTI Festival through a six-song televised competition in a special episode of Megavisión's regular talent show Hágase famoso presented by Leo Caprile.

Competing entries on the national final (Note: Incomplete list of the six competing entries.)
Song	Artist	Songwriter(s)
"Mucho amor"	Osvaldo Sepúlveda	Osvaldo Sepúlveda
"Nunca sabrás cuánto te amo"	Rachel	Alejandro Afani

=== Final ===
The national final was held on Monday 13 October 1997. The jury consisted of five members: Alfredo Alonso representing CHV, Angélica Castro representing UCTV, Fernando Solabarrieta representing TVN, Verónica Calabi representing Megavisión, and the chairperson Ítalo Passalacqua representing the Asociación de Periodistas de Espectáculos. The winner was "Mucho amor", written and performed by Osvaldo Sepúlveda.

Winner

Result of the national final
R/O	Song	Artist	Result
	"Mucho amor"	Osvaldo Sepúlveda	1
	"Nunca sabrás cuánto te amo"	Rachel	

=== Disqualification and replacement ===
After the national final, the other participants claimed that the winning song violated the rules, since it had been performed in a previous episode of the same talent show and was therefore not new, as required by the rules. The song was ultimately disqualified, and in a closed-door meeting of the jury, they chose "Nunca sabrás cuánto te amo", written by Alejandro Afani, and performed by Rachel, as the Chilean entry for the OTI Festival.

== At the OTI Festival ==
On 24–25 October 1997, the OTI Festival was held at Plaza Mayor in Lima, Peru, hosted by Compañía Peruana de Radiodifusión (CPR), and broadcast live throughout Ibero-America. Rachel performed "Nunca sabrás cuánto te amo" in the semi-final, with René Calderón conducting the event's orchestra, and qualifying for the final. In the final, she performed in position 2 and was not among the top-three places revealed at the end.
