= El Salvador in the OTI Festival 1997 =

- OTI Festival 1997
- Participating broadcaster: Telecorporación Salvadoreña (TCS)
- Country: El Salvador
- Selection process: National OTI Festival

Competing entry
- Song: "Cantándole a la vida"
- Artist: Rafael Alfaro
- Songwriter: Rafael Alfaro

Placement
- Semi-final result: Failed to qualify

Participation chronology
◄1996 •	1997	• 1998►

El Salvador was represented at the OTI Festival 1997 with the song "Cantándole a la vida", written and performed by Rafael Alfaro. The Salvadoran participating broadcaster, Telecorporación Salvadoreña (TCS), selected its entry through a national televised competition with several phases. The song failed to qualify in the semi-final.

== National stage ==
Telecorporación Salvadoreña (TCS) held a national competition with five televised qualifying rounds and a final to select its entry for the 26th edition of the OTI Festival. The competition took place within the regular weekly show Fin de semana, was presented by Willie Maldonado, and was broadcast on Canal 4.

The jury in the final was composed by Janet Cienfuegos, Ernesto González, Ana Lilian Rodríguez, Eduardo Fuentes, and Patricia Valiente. Following each performance, every juror scored each the lyrics, music, and originality between 1 and 10 points.

The winner was "Cantándole a la vida", written and performed by Rafael Alfaro, who received the Gato de oro trophy; with "Porque te quiero cantar", written by Martín Alonso Barriere and performed by Cecilia Regalado, placing second and receiving the Gato de plata trophy; and "Infinita soledad", written by Daniel Urrutia and performed by Magaly Zelaya Campos, placing third and receiving the Gato de bronce trophy. Ricardo Escalante and Julio Roberto Hernández also received a crystal trophy.

Winner

Result of the final of the National OTI Festival – El Salvador 1997 (Note: Incomplete list of the competing entries.)
R/O	Song	Artist	Songwriter(s)	Points	Result
3	"Cantándole a la vida"	Rafael Alfaro	Rafael Alfaro	119	1
	"Porque te quiero cantar"	Cecilia Regalado	Martín Alonso Barriere		2
	"Infinita soledad"	Magaly Zelaya Campos	Daniel Urrutia		3
	"Cómo podría dejarte"	Ricardo Escalante	Ricardo Escalante		
	"Amor de verdad"	Julio Roberto Hernández	Freddy Solano		

== At the OTI Festival ==
On 24–25 October 1997, the OTI Festival was held at Plaza Mayor in Lima, Peru, hosted by Compañía Peruana de Radiodifusión (CPR), and broadcast live throughout Ibero-America. Rafael Alfaro performed "Cantándole a la vida" in the semi-final, with Víctor Salazar conducting the event's orchestra, and not qualifying for the final.
