= Los Legionarios (American TV program) =

Soccer television show

- Created by: José Luis Estela
- Presented by: José Luis Estela
- Country of origin: United States
- Original language: Spanish

Production
- Running time: 30 minutes

Original release
- Network: Teletica
- Release: October 4, 2015

Los Legionarios (Also known as Legionarios and Legionarios con José Luis Estela) is a television show that focuses on the lives and careers of Hispanic soccer players who play in international leagues. The program offers exclusive interviews and an intimate look into the personal and professional lives of the players.

== History ==
The program was created and is hosted by José Luis Estela, a renowned Venezuelan-Spanish journalist and television producer based in the United States. The pilot initially premiered on Channel 9 in 2015, as short interviews featuring prominent Costa Rican soccer players playing for MLS clubs during halftime of broadcast matches. Subsequently, the project became an independent program and premiered on TD+ in October 2015. In May 2016, Los Legionarios moved to Teletica Canal 7 until October 2017 and in November of that year to Repretel, expanding its audience and national reach.

== Format ==
In each episode, José Luis Estela visits Costa Rican athletes at their places of residence or training grounds. Through in-depth interviews, the program explores not only the players' professional performance, but also their experiences of cultural adaptation, family life, and personal challenges. The objective is to show “the other side” of the players, giving the audience a more human and up-close perspective of their sports idols.

=== Guests ===
Among the professional athletes who have participated in the program, are renowned figures such as:

- Keylor Navas
- Bryan Ruiz
- Bryan Oviedo
- Cristian Gamboa
- Shirley Cruz
- Andrey Amador
