= Cuba in the OTI Festival 1997 =

- OTI Festival 1997
- Participating broadcaster: Cuban Institute of Radio and Television (ICRT)
- Country: Cuba
- Selection process: National OTI Festival
- Selection date: October 1997

Competing entry
- Song: "Golondrina"
- Artist: Tania Tania
- Songwriter: Samuel Concepción

Placement
- Semi-final result: Qualified
- Final result: Finalist

Participation chronology
◄1996 •	1997	• 1998►

Cuba was represented at the OTI Festival 1997 with the song "Golondrina", written by Samuel Concepción, and performed by Tania Tania. The Cuban participating broadcaster, the Cuban Institute of Radio and Television (ICRT), selected its entry through a national televised competition. The song, qualified from the semi-final, was one of the finalists.

== National stage ==
The Cuban Institute of Radio and Television (ICRT) held a national televised competition to select its entry for the 26th edition of the OTI Festival.

Competing entries on the National OTI Festival – Cuba 1997 (Note: Incomplete list of the competing entries.)
Song	Artist	Songwriter(s)
"Golondrina"	Tania Tania	Samuel Concepción
"Porque tú ya no estás"	Alfonso Llorens	Alfonso Llorens
"Un canto a mi guitarra"	Leo Montesinos	Julio A. Brito

=== Final ===
The final was held in October 1997, presented by Alina Rodríguez and Héctor Quintero. The winner was "Golondrina", written by Samuel Concepción, and performed by Tania Tania; with "Porque tú ya no estás", written and performed by Alfonso Llorens, placing second; and "Un canto a mi guitarra", written by Julio A. Brito, and performed by Leo Montesinos, placing third. The first prize trophies were delivered by Eduardo Antonio, the second prize trophies by Rojitas, and the third prize trophies by Jorge Luis Pacheco. The festival ended with a reprise of the winning entry.

Winner

Result of the final of the National OTI Festival – Cuba 1997
R/O	Song	Artist	Result
	"Golondrina"	Tania Tania	1
	"Porque tú ya no estás"	Alfonso Llorens	2
	"Un canto a mi guitarra"	Leo Montesinos	3

== At the OTI Festival ==
On 24–25 October 1997, the OTI Festival was held at Plaza Mayor in Lima, Peru, hosted by Compañía Peruana de Radiodifusión (CPR), and broadcast live throughout Ibero-America. Tania Tania performed "Golondrina" in the semi-final, with Víctor Salazar conducting the event's orchestra, and qualifying for the final. In the final, it was not among the top-three places revealed at the end.
