= Peru in the OTI Festival =

- OTI Festival
- Participating broadcaster: Panamericana Televisión; Compañía Peruana de Radiodifusión (CPR)

Participation summary
- Appearances: 28
- First appearance: 1972
- Last appearance: 2000
- Highest placement: 2nd: 1973
- Host: 1982, 1997
- Participation history: 1972; 1973; 1974; 1975; 1976; 1977; 1978; 1979; 1980; 1981; 1982; 1983; 1984; 1985; 1986; 1987; 1988; 1989; 1990; 1991; 1992; 1993; 1994; 1995; 1996; 1997; 1998; 2000

The participation of Peru in the OTI Festival began at the first OTI Festival in 1972. The Peruvian participating broadcasters were Panamericana Televisión and Compañía Peruana de Radiodifusión (CPR), members of the Organización de Televisión Iberoamericana (OTI). They participated in all twenty-eight editions of the festival, and hosted the event twice: in 1982 and 1997. Their best result was second achieved in 1973.

Peruvian first participant, Betty Missiego, would represent Spain in the Eurovision Song Contest 1979 with "Su canción", placing second.

== History ==
Even though the debut of Peru in the festival was not successful, the following entries, which were selected internally, were much more promising. In fact, in 1973, "El mundo gira por tu amor" performed by Gabriela de Jesús, placed second.

In 1977, "Landó" by Cecilia Bracamonte managed to place sixth and turned into a hit in the South American country. In 1982, when the event was hosted in Lima for first time, "El signo en la frente" by Elsa María Elejalde managed again to enter the top 10 with a seventh place.

In 1988, "Partiré, buscaré" by Rocky Belmonte achieved third place, and in 1996, "Bendito amor" by Carmina Cannavino ended in the same place. Rocky Belmonte, returned to the event in 1990 and 1994. The last Peruvian representative in the event was Anna Carina, who, although she didn't manage to reach the top 10, turned into a well known personality in the country.

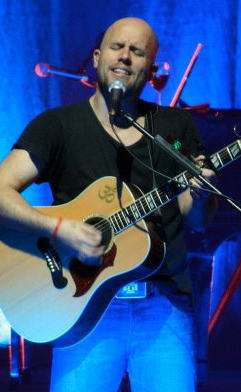
Gian Marco represented Perú in 1993

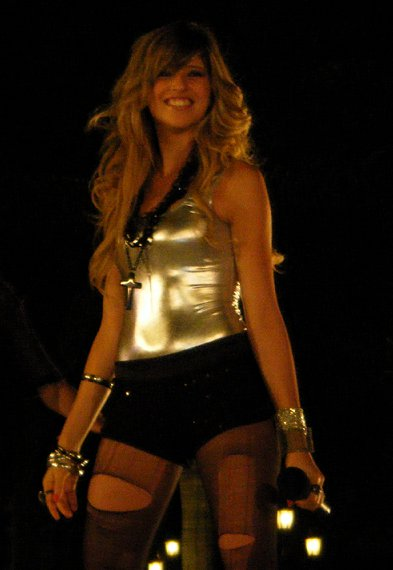
Anna Carina turned into the last represented Perú in 2000

== Participation overview ==
Table key
2	Second place
3	Third place
F	Finalist
SF	Semi-finalist
◇	Contest cancelled

Year	Song	Artist	Songwriter(s)	Conductor	Place	Points
1972	"Recuerdos de un adiós"	Betty Missiego	Betty Missiego	Román Alís	9	3
1973	"El mundo gira por tu amor"	Gabriela de Jesús	Jaime Delgado Aparicio; Mario Cavagnaro	Ivan Pablo	2	10
1974	"Mujer primera"	César Altamirano	Juan Gonzalo Rose; César Calvo; Jorge Madueño	Jorge Madueño	18	0
1975	"¡Qué lindo es el amor!"	Gladys Mercado	Luz María Carriquiry	Enrique Lynch	10	3
1976	"Quiero salir al sol"	Fernando Llosa	Ernesto Pollarolo; Alejandro Romualdo		15	1
1977	"Landó"	Cecilia Bracamonte	Chabuca Granda	Pancho Sáenz	6	3
1978	"Mujer mujer"	Homero	María Teresa de Fernández; Juan Manuel Fernández	Amadeo Rosano	12	6
1979	"Benito gazeta"	José Escajadillo	José Escajadillo	Víctor Cuadros	11	14
1980	"Un buen motivo para amar"	Regina Alcóver	Regina Alcóver	Víctor Salazar	11	13
1981	"Hombre de mis sueños"	Gladys Mercado	Violeta Roggero		12	11
1982	"El signo en la frente"	Elsa María Elejalde	Víctor Merino; Francisco García	Víctor Cuadros	7	20
1983	"Cierra la puerta"	Arturo Morales	Félix Yosi	Víctor Cuadros	—N/a	
1984	"Todos los días pueden ser Navidad"	Raúl Vásquez	Raúl Vásquez	Luis Neves	—N/a	
1985	"Señora de nadie"	Luis Alonso	Manuel Cortez	Víctor Cuadros	—N/a	
1986	"Aprenderé"	Francesco Petrozzi	José Ugas La Rosa; Juan Miguel Salas	Horacio Saavedra	—N/a	
1987	"He aprendido a volar"	Jenny Higginson	Emilio Pepe Ortega	Emilio Pepe Ortega	—N/a	
1988	"Partiré, buscaré"	Rocky Belmonte	Jorge Tafur	Jorge Tafur	3	16
1989	"Nadie me ama como tú"	Mache	Claudio Fabbri; Armando Massé	Luis Dibos	—N/a	
1990	"Viajero"	Rocky Belmonte	Jorge Tafur	Jorge Tafur	—N/a	
1991	"Enamorado de estar aquí"	Eva Ayllón y Fahed Mitre	Fahed Mitre; Miguel Figueroa	Miguel Figueroa	SF	—N/a
1992	"Así como te doy, te quito"	Tania Helfgott	Denise Echeverría; Óscar Cavero	Óscar Cavero	—N/a	
1993	"Volvamos a empezar"	Gian Marco	Gian Marco	Emilio Pepe Ortega	—N/a	
1994	"Mía"	Rocky Belmonte	Armando Massé	José Fabra	SF	—N/a
1995	"Brillo en la piel"	Julio Andrade	Julio Andrade	Carlos Wong	—N/a	
1996	"Bendito amor"	Carmina Cannavino	Ángel Chanon	Víctor Salazar	3	—N/a
1997	"Un lugar sin fronteras"	Fabiola de la Cuba	A. Aguirre	Víctor Salazar	F	—N/a
1998	"Te llevo en el alma"	Lupe Eslava	Elena Romero; Lucho González	Álvaro Esquivel	SF	—N/a
1999	Contest cancelled ◇					
2000	"Un planeta, un corazón"	Anna Carina	Gonzalo Polar; Jorge Sabogal	Hernando Hernández	F	—N/a

== Hosting ==
Year	City	Venue	Hosts	Ref.
1982	Lima	Coliseo Amauta	Humberto Martínez Morosini; Zenaida Solís; Pepe Ludmir; Silvia Maccera	
1997	Lima	Plaza Mayor	Jorge Belevan; Claudia Doig	
