= OTI Festival 1993 =

22nd OTI Song Festival

Date and venue
- Final: 9 October 1993
- Venue: Teatro Principal; Valencia, Spain

Organization
- Organizer: Organización de Televisión Iberoamericana (OTI)

Production
- Host broadcaster: Televisión Española (TVE)
- Director: Jaime Azpilicueta
- Musical director: José Fabra
- Presenters: Paloma San Basilio; Francisco

Participants
- Number of entries: 25
- Returning countries: Brazil
- Non-returning countries: Equatorial Guinea
- Participation map: Participating countries Countries that participated in the past but not in 1993

Vote
- Voting system: The members of a single jury selected their favourite songs in a secret vote
- Winning song: Spain "Enamorarse"

The OTI Festival 1993 (Spanish: Vigésimo Segundo Gran Premio de la Canción Iberoamericana, Portuguese: Vigésimo Segundo Grande Prêmio da Canção Ibero-Americana) was the 22nd edition of the OTI Festival, held on 9 October 1993 at Teatro Principal in Valencia, Spain, and presented by Paloma San Basilio and Francisco. It was organised by the Organización de Televisión Iberoamericana (OTI) and host broadcaster Televisión Española (TVE), who staged the event after winning the 1992 festival for Spain with the song "A dónde voy sin ti" by Francisco.

Broadcasters from twenty-five countries participated in the festival. The winner was the song "Enamorarse", written by Alejandro Abad and Josep Llobell, and performed by Ana Reverte representing Spain; with "Essa fase do amor", written by Altay Veloso and Samuel Santana, and performed by Emílio Santiago representing Brazil, and "Siempre a medias", written by José Manuel Fernández Espinosa, and performed by Magdalena Zárate representing Mexico, both placing second; and "Onde Estás?", written by João Dique and Marco Quelhas, and performed by Anabela representing Portugal, placing third.

== Location ==
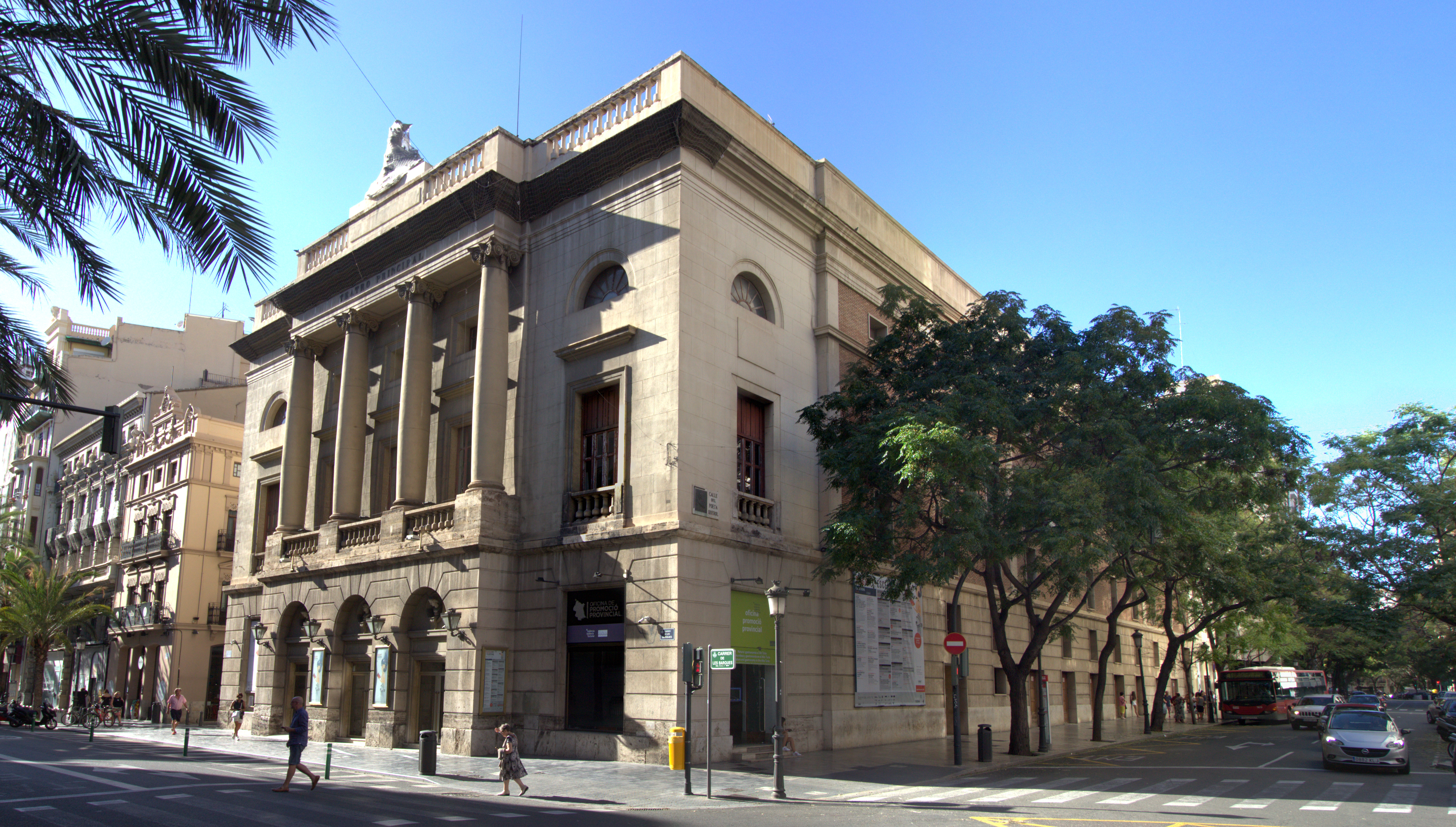
Teatro Principal, Valencia – host venue of the OTI Festival 1993.

Televisión Española (TVE) staged the OTI Festival 1993 in Valencia. The venue selected was the Teatro Principal, a theatre opened in 1832 that was designed by Filippo da Pistoia.

TVE had also hosted the 1992 festival at the same venue. The General Assembly of the Organización de Televisión Iberoamericana (OTI) proposed to TVE to host the festival again, given the audience, organization, and artistic success achieved in 1992.

== Participants ==
Broadcasters from twenty-five countries participated in this edition of the OTI festival, equaling the record for the maximum number of participants achieved in the previous edition. The OTI members, public or private broadcasters from Spain, Portugal, and twenty-three Spanish and Portuguese speaking countries of Ibero-America signed up for the festival. Brazil returned after having missed the festival since 1988 and Equatorial Guinea withdrew after its only participation in the festival.

Some of the participating broadcasters, such as those representing Chile, Cuba, and Ecuador, selected their entries through their regular national televised competitions. Other broadcasters decided to select their entry internally.

One performing artist had previously represented the same country in a previous edition: Mario Vides had represented Guatemala in 1975.

Participants of the OTI Festival 1993
Country	Broadcaster(s)	Song	Artist	Songwriter(s)	Language	Conductor
Argentina		"Yo soy el otro"	Marcelo San Juan	Fernando Porta; Marcelo San Juan	Spanish	José Fabra
Bolivia		"El jardín de los sueños"	Adrián Barrenechea	Adrián Barrenechea	Spanish	César Scotta
Brazil		"Essa fase do amor"	Emílio Santiago	Altay Veloso; Samuel Santana	Portuguese	Luiz Avellar
Canada		"Suelta mi mano, gitana"	Omar Ortiz	Omar Ortiz	Spanish	Hernani Raposo
Chile	TVN; UCTV; RTU; CCT; Megavisión	"María y Manuel"	Keko Yunge	Alfonso Yunge; Keko Yunge	Spanish	Marc Friedler
Colombia		"Como volver a amar"	Alexa Hernández	Marcelo Cezán	Spanish	José Fabra
Costa Rica	Teletica	"Yo soy América"	Luis Fernando Piedra	Elvis Porras; Marisa Porras; Luis Fernando Piedra	Spanish	William Porras
Cuba	ICRT	"Amor de miedo"	Manolo Sánchez	José Valladares	Spanish	Guillermo Valverde
Dominican Republic		"Sigue"	Grupo Triada	Mario Díaz; Manuel Tejada	Spanish	Manuel Tejada
Ecuador		"Él tiene razón"	Pericles	Pablo Noboa	Spanish	Fredy Moreno
El Salvador	TCS	"Ella"	Roberto Salamanca	Roberto Salamanca	Spanish	José Fabra
Guatemala		"Niño, salva a tu mundo"	Mario Vides	Mario Vides; Judith Méndez	Spanish	José Fabra
Honduras		"Sale el sol"	Carlos Alberto	Leo Villeda; Asdra	Spanish	José Fabra
Mexico	Televisa	"Siempre a medias"	Magdalena Zárate	José Manuel Fernández Espinosa	Spanish	Alberto Núñez
Netherlands Antilles	ATM	"Si te vuelvo a encontrar"	Melania Arroyo	Melania Arroyo; José Gregorio	Spanish	José Gregorio
Nicaragua		"Cuando tengo tu amor"	Wallmaro Gutiérrez	Holvin Sandino	Spanish	Raúl Martínez
Panama	RPC-TV	"Canción a mi madre"	Tony Cheng	Lali Carrizo	Spanish	Edgardo Quintero
Paraguay		"Señora mía"	Danny Durán	Danny Durán; Rolando Percy	Spanish	Willy Suchard
Peru		"Volvamos a empezar"	Gian Marco	Gian Marco	Spanish	Pepe Ortega
Portugal	RTP	"Onde Estás?"	Anabela	João Dique; Marco Quelhas	Portuguese	Thilo Krasmann
Puerto Rico	Telemundo Puerto Rico	"Que siga la rumba"	Rumba y Bembé	Eduardo Reyes; Miguel Soto	Spanish	Eduardo Reyes
Spain	TVE	"Enamorarse"	Ana Reverte	Alejandro Abad; Josep Llobell	Spanish	José Fabra
United States	Univision	"Esperanza, capricho o viento"	Alma Rocío	Hernán Moreno; Javier D'Angelo	Spanish	Roberto Chiofalo
Uruguay	Sociedad Televisora Larrañaga	"Si eres árbol caído"	Pablo Estramín	Pablo Estramín	Spanish	Julio Frade
Venezuela		"No me arriesgo"	Nicolás Felizzola	Alejandro Salas	Spanish	Alejandro Salas

== Festival overview ==
The festival was held on Saturday 9 October 1993, beginning at 22:00 CET (21:00 UTC). It was directed by Jaime Azpilicueta, and presented by Paloma San Basilio and Francisco. San Basilio had previously presented the festival in 1985 and 1992, while Francisco had won the 1992 festival for Spain with the song "A dónde voy sin ti". The musical director was José Fabra, who conducted the Mediterranean Symphony Orchestra when required. The draw to determine the running order (R/O) was held on 10 September.

The event featured guest performances by Susana Rinaldi, Rocío Jurado, Chavela Vargas, Massiel, Serafín Zubiri, Sara Montiel, Concha Márquez Piquer, Mary Carrillo, Paloma San Basilio, Francisco, the Compañía Cubana de Boleros, and a ballet specially assembled for the occasion. The guest artists, in addition to performing, also presented some of the songs in competition.

The winner was the song "Enamorarse", written by Alejandro Abad and Josep Llobell, and performed by Ana Reverte representing Spain; with "Essa fase do amor", written by Altay Veloso and Samuel Santana, and performed by Emílio Santiago representing Brazil, and "Siempre a medias", written by José Manuel Fernández Espinosa, and performed by Magdalena Zárate representing Mexico, both placing second; and "Onde Estás?", written by João Dique and Marco Quelhas, and performed by Anabela representing Portugal, placing third. There were two trophies designed by José González Onieva for each of the first three places, one for the songwriters and one for the performer. The first prize trophies were delivered by Guillermo Cañedo, president of OTI, and Rocío Jurado; the second prize trophies by Óscar Gutiérrez, president of the OTI legal commission, and Nicanor González, president of the OTI programs committee; and the third prize trophies by Carmelo Artesiano, OTI consultant, and Eladio Lárez, vice-president of the OTI programs committee. The first prize was endowed with a monetary amount of US$50,000, the second prize of US$30,000, and the third prize of US$20,000. The festival ended with a reprise of the winning entry.

Winner

Results of the OTI Festival 1993
R/O	Country	Song	Artist	Place
1	Argentina	"Yo soy el otro"	Marcelo San Juan	—N/a
2	Canada	"Suelta mi mano, gitana"	Omar Ortiz	—N/a
3	Puerto Rico	"Que siga la rumba"	Rumba y Bembé	—N/a
4	Dominican Republic	"Sigue"	Grupo Triada	—N/a
5	United States	"Esperanza, capricho o viento"	Alma Rocío	—N/a
6	Cuba	"Amor de miedo"	Manolo Sánchez	—N/a
7	Peru	"Volvamos a empezar"	Gian Marco	—N/a
8	Colombia	"Como volver a amar"	Alexa Hernández	—N/a
9	Portugal	"Onde Estás?"	Anabela	3
10	Costa Rica	"Yo soy América"	Luis Fernando Piedra	—N/a
11	Paraguay	"Señora mía"	Danny Durán	—N/a
12	Uruguay	"Si eres árbol caído"	Pablo Estramín	—N/a
13	Honduras	"Sale el sol"	Carlos Alberto	—N/a
14	Venezuela	"No me arriesgo"	Nicolás Felizzola	—N/a
15	Bolivia	"El jardín de los sueños"	Adrián Barrenechea	—N/a
16	Brazil	"Essa fase do amor"	Emílio Santiago	2
17	Panama	"Canción a mi madre"	Tony Cheng	—N/a
18	Chile	"María y Manuel"	Keko Yunge	—N/a
19	Netherlands Antilles	"Si te vuelvo a encontrar"	Melania	—N/a
20	Nicaragua	"Cuando tengo tu amor"	Wallmaro Gutiérrez	—N/a
21	Mexico	"Siempre a medias"	Magdalena Zárate	2
22	Ecuador	"Él tiene razón"	Pericles	—N/a
23	Guatemala	"Niño, salva a tu mundo"	Mario Vides	—N/a
24	El Salvador	"Ella"	Roberto Salamanca	—N/a
25	Spain	"Enamorarse"	Ana Reverte	1

=== Jury ===
The nine members of a single jury selected their favourite songs in a secret vote. The voting system was not disclosed, and only the top three places were revealed, with second place awarded to two songs jointly. The members of the jury were:

- Susana Rinaldi – singer
- Lupita Ferrer – actress
- Antonio Ferrandis – actor
- Carlos Cuevas – singer, won the festival for Mexico in 1990
- Narciso Ibáñez Menta – actor
- José María Torrent – lawyer
- Javier Casal – director of the Palau de la Música de València
- Salomé – singer
- Francisco Nicholson – writer

== Broadcast ==
The festival was broadcast in the 25 participating countries where the corresponding OTI member broadcasters relayed the contest through their networks after receiving it live via satellite. It was reported that the event was also broadcast in New Zealand, Kuwait, Saudi Arabia, Hungary, and Poland.

Known details on the broadcasts in each country, including the specific broadcasting stations and commentators are shown in the tables below.

Broadcasters and commentators in participating countries
Country	Broadcaster	Channel(s)	Commentator(s)	Ref.
Costa Rica	Teletica	Canal 7		
Mexico	Televisa	Canal 2 (Note: Delayed broadcast at 22:30 CST (04:30+1 UTC))		
Netherlands Antilles	ATM	TeleCuraçao (Note: Delayed broadcast at 21:30 AST (01:30+1 UTC))		
Panama	RPC-TV	Canal 4 (Note: Delayed broadcast at 20:00 EST (01:00+1 UTC))		
Spain	TVE	La Primera	No commentary	
United States	Univision (Note: Delayed broadcast later that day by all Univision affiliates, each in their own time zone.)			

The broadcast in Spain attracted 3.663 million viewers on average.
