= Vibras the Music Company =

Costa Rican music production company and record label, founded 2014

Vibras The Music Company
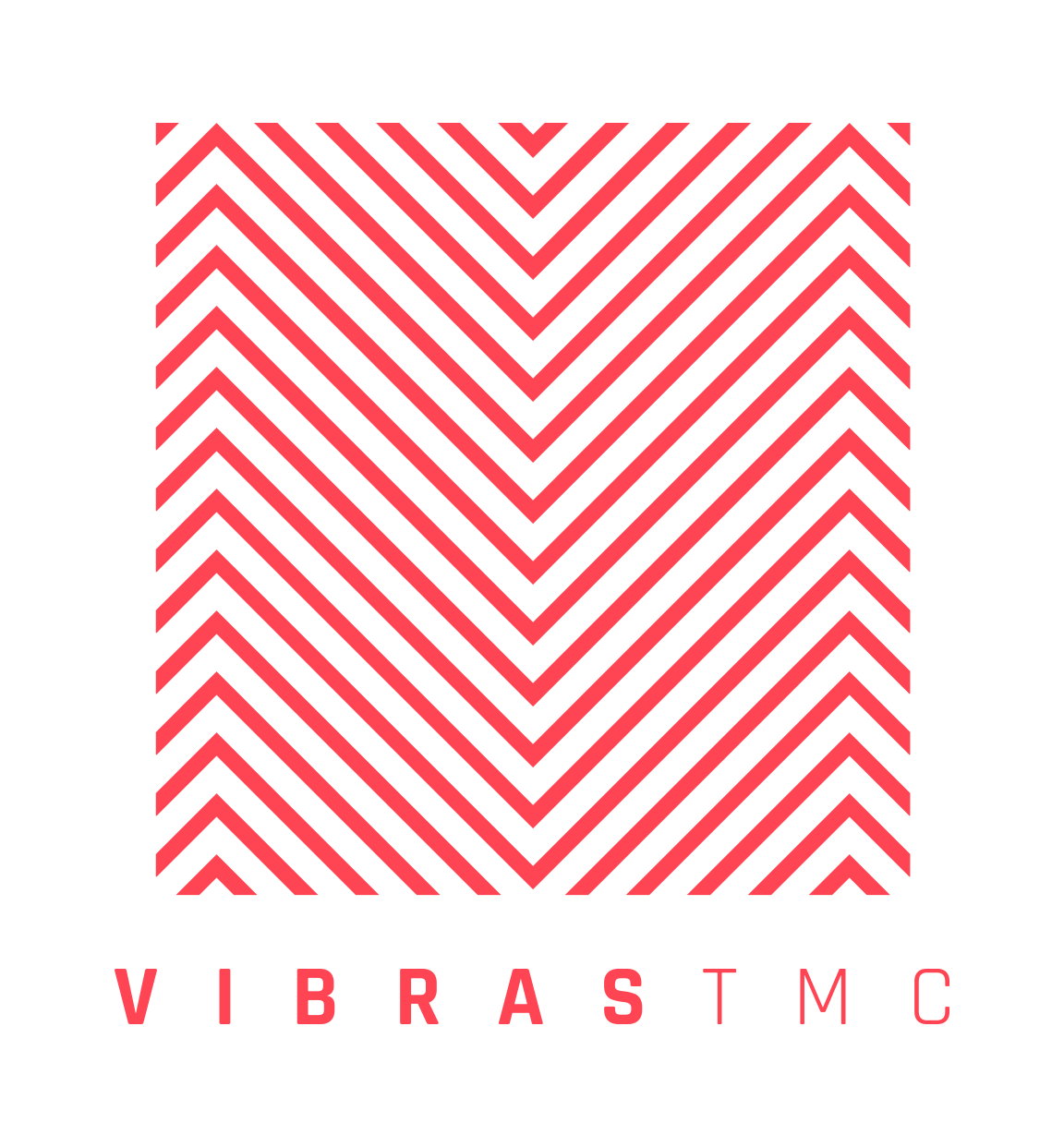
- Type: Private
- Industry: Music industry
- Founded: 2014
- Founder: Gabriel López Peña
- Headquarters: San José, Costa Rica
- Area served: International
- Services: Music production, Mixing and mastering, Audiovisual production, Artist development, Sync licensing, Digital marketing
- Website: vibrastmc.com

Vibras The Music Company (commonly known as Vibras TMC) is a Costa Rican music production company and record label headquartered in San José, Costa Rica. Founded in 2014, the company provides music production, audio engineering, mixing and mastering, artist development, audiovisual production, sync licensing, and digital marketing services. Its catalog is distributed internationally through ADA Latin, a division of Warner Music Group.

== History ==
Vibras The Music Company was established in 2014 in San José, Costa Rica, by producers and musicians Gabriel López Peña (known professionally as Worka, and formerly as Workaholix), Pranz, and Maul. The three founders had each pursued careers as performing artists before building the company as a full-service production house aimed at developing Costa Rican and Latin American acts.

By 2017, the label had launched more than 160 productions for artists across multiple genres. In subsequent years it expanded its catalog significantly, reaching over 500 completed artistic projects, across genres including electronic music, reggaetón, indie pop, and Latin pop.

Vibras TMC distributes its releases internationally through ADA Latin, a Warner Music Group subsidiary. Several artists developed at the label went on to sign with major international labels, including Virgin Music Mexico, part of Universal Music Group.

Co-founder Pranz later departed to establish his own company, Cero 7 Entertainment. La Nación reported that the split was amicable, the result of diverging business visions, and that Pranz credited Vibras as the foundation of his early career.

== Artists and collaborations ==
=== Fátima Pinto ===
Costa Rican singer-songwriter Fátima Pinto began her recording career at Vibras TMC. Her 2017 debut single "Feel Something" was produced by Gabriel López at the label's San José studio, entered national radio rotation, and accumulated over 100,000 Spotify streams within weeks of its release. A follow-up single, "Belong Together", accumulated nearly three million Facebook views. Pinto was signed by Virgin Music México in 2021, after accumulating over eight million streams across digital platforms. She continued to collaborate with Vibras TMC producers after signing to Universal Music Group, co-producing her Virgin Music debut single "Algo más" with Gabo López of the label. In 2026, Pinto received a nomination for Best Female Pop Song at the Premios Estela, a Central American music award held annually in Guatemala, for her single "Un personaje".

=== Avi ===
Singer-songwriter Avi (Ana Virginia Chaves) released her debut EP Nothing Is Ever The Same through Vibras TMC. The single "One Night" (featuring Échelé Miel) reached number six on the national chart of most-played Costa Rican songs and number one in the Anglo category for June 2017, according to Diario Co Latino. A subsequent single, "Goodbye", reached number seven on the national chart and number one in the Anglo category in the September 2017 reporting period. A later single, "Magic", was produced at Vibras TMC by Worka; Teletica reported on its release and identified Worka as the track's music producer.

=== Gimario ===
Singer Gimario recorded his 2022 single "Marimba" at the Vibras TMC studio; the music was produced and the music video was directed by Worka. Teletica covered the release, noting that Gimario had been pursuing a music career for twelve years before the track.

=== Mía Paz ===
Singer Mía Paz, who returned to Costa Rica in 2016 after fifteen years in the United States, released several singles through Vibras TMC, including "Shelter" and "Fucking Magic".

=== Lulú Caramel ===
Singer Lulú Caramel released her debut EP Desde El Corazón De San José through Vibras TMC in 2024. Her single "Sex, Drugs and Rock & Roll" received a nomination for Best Rock Song at the 2026 Premios Estela, an annual Central American music award held in Guatemala.

=== Gerez ===
Venezuelan-Costa Rican producer Jorge González Jerez (known as Gerez) joined the Vibras TMC production team and co-produced the track "Que Vida" with Gabriel López (Worka) for artist Fátima Pinto, according to El Carabobeño.

=== Jeyvez ===
Cartago-based singer Javier Cisneros, known as Jeyvez, collaborated with Worka on the project Mi vida depende de esto. Diario Extra reported that Jeyvez contributed three songs to the album and released the single "Imaginando" alongside López, whom the publication identified as "Gabriel López, mejor conocido como Worka."

== Notable projects ==
In 2017, Vibras TMC organized a public talent competition to discover emerging Costa Rican artists. The jury included Costa Rican musicians Debi Nova, Jaime Gamboa, and Manuel Obregón, alongside producer Roberto Montero.

Between 2023 and 2024, Worka undertook the project Mi vida depende de esto ("My Life Depends on This"), releasing approximately 100 songs featuring artists both inside and outside the Vibras TMC roster across the span of 100 days. Diario Extra described the project as an album released by Gabriel López (Worka), involving musicians from within and beyond the Vibras catalog.

== Industry partnerships ==
Vibras TMC has distributed releases internationally through ADA Latin, a Warner Music Group subsidiary. The label has also produced tracks for artists signed to Virgin Music Mexico (part of Universal Music Group), as well as working with ONErpm and Rude Mood Records (Los Angeles).
