= Ricardo Padilla (singer) =

Costa Rican singer (born 1948)

- Born: Ricardo Padilla Fonseca; 11 March 1947 (age 79); San José, Costa Rica
- Genres: Latin pop
- Occupations: Singer; songwriter; actor
- Label: Musart Records

Ricardo Padilla Fonseca (born 11 March 1947) is a Costa Rican singer, songwriter, and actor. With a career spanning more than 50 years, he is considered one of the most outstanding Costa Rican musicians. He has represented Costa Rica in the OTI Festival three times as a performer of his own penned songs, and once more as songwriter.

In 2019, the Asociación de Compositores y Autores Musicales de Costa Rica presented him with an award for his 50-year artistic career.

== Background ==
Padilla lived in Mexico for 29 years, where he combined his singing career with acting in photonovels, telenovelas, and films. Some of the songs most famously performed by him are "Puntarenas" (written by him), "Ni amante, ni amor ni nada" (written by Alejandro Vezzani), "Garra de león" (by Daniel Moncada), and "Con quién estás" (by Cacho Castaña).

In 2019, the Asociación de Compositores y Autores Musicales de Costa Rica presented him with an award for his 50-year artistic career.

== At the OTI Festival ==
Padilla has represented Costa Rica in the OTI Festival three times as a performer of his own penned songs, finishing in fourth place twice, and once more as songwriter.

Participations in the OTI festival
Year	Country	Song	Performer	Songwriter	Result
1980	Costa Rica	"El amor se va"	Ricardo Padilla		4th
1982	Costa Rica	"La mujer de mi vida"	Ricardo Padilla		4th
1990	Costa Rica	"Promesa de amor"	Alejandro Ulate	Ricardo Padilla	—N/a
1994	Costa Rica	"Como vino... se fue"	Ricardo Padilla		SF
