= Mexico in the OTI Festival 1997 =

- OTI Festival 1997
- Participating broadcaster: Televisa
- Country: Mexico
- Selection process: National OTI Festival
- Selection date: 8 October 1997

Competing entry
- Song: "Se diga lo que se diga"
- Artist: Iridián
- Songwriters: Francisco Curiel; José Manuel Fernández

Placement
- Semi-final result: Qualified
- Final result: 1st

Participation chronology
◄1996 •	1997	• 1998►

Mexico was represented at the OTI Festival 1997 with the song "Se diga lo que se diga", written by Francisco Curiel and José Manuel Fernández, and performed by Iridián. The Mexican participating broadcaster, Televisa, selected its entry through a national televised competition with several phases. The song placed first out of 22 competing entries, winning the festival. This was the sixth entry from Mexico that won the OTI Festival, after winning in 1973, in 1975, in 1985, in 1989, and in 1990.

== Background ==
Between 1972 and 1990, Televisa had organized a national festival to select its entry for the OTI Festival for nineteen editions. Between 1991 and 1996, this National OTI Festival was discontinued, and instead, a performer was chosen through the Valores juveniles young talents competition and an internal committee had chosen a song for the international festival. For 1997, Televisa decided to revive the national selection festival.

== National stage ==
Televisa held a national competition with three televised qualifying rounds and a final to select its entry for the 26th edition of the OTI Festival. The selection was held within the show Al ritmo de la noche presented by Jorge Ortiz de Pinedo and broadcast on El Canal de las Estrellas. The three qualifying rounds were held on Wednesdays 17 and 24 September, and 1 October, and the final on 8 October 1997.

The winner was "Se diga lo que se diga", written by Francisco Curiel and José Manuel Fernández, and performed by Iridián; with "Un aplauso a la vida", written by Felipe Gil and performed by Sofía Miranda, placing second. Raúl Velasco delivered the trophy to the winner.

Winner

Result of the final of the National OTI Festival – Mexico 1997 (Note: Incomplete list of the competing entries.)
R/O	Song	Artist	Result
	"Se diga lo que se diga"	Iridián	1
	"Un aplauso a la vida"	Sofía Miranda	2

== At the OTI Festival ==
On 24–25 October 1997, the OTI Festival was held at Plaza Mayor in Lima, Peru, hosted by Compañía Peruana de Radiodifusión (CPR), and broadcast live throughout Ibero-America. Iridián performed "Se diga lo que se diga" in the semi-final, with Pedro Alberto Cárdenas conducting the event's orchestra, and qualifying for the final. At the end, the song placed first in the final, winning the festival. This was the sixth entry from Mexico that won the OTI Festival, after winning in 1973, in 1975, in 1985, in 1989, and in 1990.
