= El Salvador in the OTI Festival =

- OTI Festival
- Participating broadcaster: 1974–1985: Canal Cuatro; 1986–2000: Telecorporación Salvadoreña (TCS)

Participation summary
- Appearances: 26
- First appearance: 1974
- Last appearance: 2000
- Highest placement: 6th in 1977
- Participation history: 1974; 1975; 1976; 1977; 1978; 1979; 1980; 1981; 1982; 1983; 1984; 1985; 1986; 1987; 1988; 1989; 1990; 1991; 1992; 1993; 1994; 1995; 1996; 1997; 1998; 2000

The participation of El Salvador in the OTI Festival began at the third OTI Festival in 1974. The Salvadoran participating broadcasters were Canal Cuatro until 1985 and Telecorporación Salvadoreña (TCS) since 1986, which were member of the Organización de Televisión Iberoamericana (OTI). They participated in all twenty-six editions after its debut. Its best result was sixth achieved in 1977.

== History ==
The first Salvadorean entry was "Todo será de nosotros" performed by Félix Lopez, which placed 10th with three points in a tie with Mexico, Honduras and the Netherlands Antilles. Since then, the country took part in every edition of the festival till the last edition which was held again in Acapulco.

El Salvador was one of the least successful participants in the OTI Festival. In 1975, one year after its debut, it finished last with zero points in a tie with Bolivia. In 1977, it achieved sixth place with "Enséñame a vivir" by Ana Marcela D'Antonio. This was the first and only time when the Salvadorean delegation reached the top ten places in the contest.

== Participation overview ==
Table key
SF	Semi-finalist
◇	Contest cancelled

Year	Song	Artist	Songwriter(s)	Conductor	Place	Points
1974	"Todo será de nosotros"	Félix López	Félix López	Chucho Ferrer	10	3
1975	"Trataré de olvidarte"	Eduardo Fuentes	Rafael Campos Martínez	José Raúl Ramírez	17	0
1976	"Tú que no mueres en la muerte"	Walter Salvador Bautista			15	1
1977	"Enséñame a vivir"	Ana Marcela D'Antonio	Ana Marcela D'Antonio	Rafael Ibarbia	6	3
1978	"Gracias"	Álvaro Torres	Juan Carlos		16	1
1979	"Niño, mi lindo niño"	Andrés Valencia	Jorge Abullajare Hasfura	Jill Carson	20	0
1980	"El séptimo día"	Ricardo Alfaro	José Francisco Bolaños Lemus	Héctor Rojas	19	4
1981	"El latinoamericano"	Eduardo Fuentes	Carlos Alberto Hernández		12	11
1982	"Con un cuento en el bolsillo"	Félix López	Félix López	Luis Neves	13	12
1983	"Del principio al final"	Ernesto Guerra	Ernesto Guerra	Julio Jaramillo	—N/a	
1984	"Soy"	Carlos Hernández	Carlos Hernández	Chucho Ferrer	—N/a	
1985	"El vendedor de canciones"	Óscar Alejandro	Óscar Alejandro	Eduardo Leiva	—N/a	
1986	"Pensalo dos veces, Martín"	Jaime Turich	Daniel Rucks	Mario Zúñiga	—N/a	
1987	"Nadie más que tú"	Iliana Posas	Iliana Posas	Fernando Correia Martins	—N/a	
1988	"No está bien"	Walter Artiga	Walter Artiga	Oscar Cardozo Ocampo	14	0
1989	"Quisiera"	Gerardo Parker	Johnny Calderón	William Sánchez	—N/a	
1990	"Todavía el amor perdona"	Walter Artiga	Walter Artiga; Carlos Pineda	Alfredo Mújica	—N/a	
1991	"Esta noche no"	Rosa María	Inés de Viaud	Chucho Ferrer	SF	—N/a
1992	"Ruego"	María Gabriela	María Gabriela Jovel		—N/a	
1993	"Ella"	Roberto Salamanca	Roberto Salamanca	José Fabra	—N/a	
1994	"Tú, sólo tú"	Claudia Basagoitia	José Balter		SF	—N/a
1995	"Ven aquí conmigo"	Matices	Ángel Ortiz; Juan Bolaños; Héctor Rodas	Oscar Cardozo Ocampo	—N/a	
1996	"Con alguien más"	Juan Manuel Bolaños	Guillermo Maldonado	Gerardo Parker	—N/a	
1997	"Cantándole a la vida"	Rafael Alfaro	Rafael Alfaro	Víctor Salazar	SF	—N/a
1998	"Año 2000"	Julio Roberto Hernández	Enrique González E.	Álvaro Esquivel	SF	—N/a
1999	Contest cancelled ◇					
2000	"Soñador"	Marinella Arrué	Roberto Godoy		SF	—N/a
