= Canada in the OTI Festival =

- OTI Festival
- Participating broadcaster: CFMT-TV

Participation summary
- Appearances: 6
- First appearance: 1986
- Last appearance: 1995
- Participation history: 1986; 1987; 1988 – 1990; 1991; 1992; 1993; 1994; 1995; 1996 – 2000

The participation of Canada in the OTI Festival began at the 15th OTI Festival in 1986. The Canadian participating broadcaster was CFMT-TV, member of the Organización de Televisión Iberoamericana (OTI). After its debut, it only participated in six editions, and all of its entries were sung in Spanish. None of them reached the top-3 that was revealed in each edition, and in the OTI Festival 1991, where there was a semi-final, the Canadian entry qualified for the final.

With its debut at the Eurovision Song Contest 2027, Canada will become the third country, after Spain and Portugal, to have participated in both the Eurovision Song Contest and the OTI Festival.

== Participation overview ==
Table key
| F | Finalist |

| Year | Song | Artist | Songwriter(s) | Conductor | Place | Points |
|---|---|---|---|---|---|---|
| 1986 | "Vamos a la fiesta" | Ricky Campbell | Ricky Campbell | Horacio Saavedra | —N/a | |
| 1987 | "Vuelve a mí" | Alberto Olivera | Alberto Olivera | Guillermo Azevedo | —N/a | |
Did not participate between 1988 and 1990
| 1991 | "Si tu te vas" | Alberto Olivera | Alberto Olivera | Chucho Ferrer | F | —N/a |
| 1992 | "Cómo te puedo amar" | José Alcides | Luis Geraldino | Martín Furmiere | —N/a | |
| 1993 | "Suelta mi mano, gitana" | Omar Ortiz | Omar Ortiz | Hernani Raposo | —N/a | |
Did not participate in 1994
| 1995 | "Quiéreme" | Mariela Torres | Jorge González | Oscar Cardozo Ocampo | —N/a | |
Did not participate between 1996 and 2000

== Broadcast ==
Broadcasts and commentators
| Year | Broadcaster | Channel(s) | Commentator(s) | Ref. |
|---|---|---|---|---|
| 1983 | CFMT-TV (Note: Delayed broadcast at 21:00 EDT (01:00+1 UTC)) | | | |
| 1986 | CFMT-TV (Note: Delayed broadcast at 22:00 EST (03:00+1 UTC)) | | | |
| 1987 | CFMT-TV (Note: Delayed broadcast at 22:00 EST (03:00+1 UTC)) | | | |

== See also ==
- Canada in the Eurovision Song Contest
