= Fabiola de la Cuba =

Peruvian singer

- Born: Fabiola María de la Cuba Carrera; 19 February 1966 (age 60), Lima, Peru
- Occupation: Musician

Fabiola María de la Cuba Carrera (Peru, Lima, 19 February 1966) is a Peruvian singer.

She began as a member of Vecinos de Juan and in 1995 in the Creole group Los Hijos del Sol. In 1996 she began her solo career with the release of her first album related to waltzes. After obtaining recognition at the "Meeting with Peru" festival at the Cultural Center of the Catholic University. She represented Peru at the OTI Festival 1997 with the song "Un lugar sin fronteras".

Since then, she has been known as a cultural ambassador when she has toured nationally and internationally with other performers of the genre. In 2002 she presented "Fabiola...de suspiro y barro", which was attended by the National Symphony and Philharmonic Orchestra of Lima.

In 2014, her most successful tour, Todo el Perú, was launched, which was also toured in the Peruvian Amazon. She obtained the title of illustrious citizen of Nuevo Chimbote. She was also decorated with the gold medal in three stars and a diploma of honour, awarded by the Council of the Order of the National Union Prize of Peru, of the National Institute of Development and Social Action Peru.

In 2019, she performed her Tuttay Quilla show for the cultural schedule of the Pan American Games that year.

== Controversies ==
In 2009, she received funding from Congressman Luis Alva Castro for stage events, in which Congress sanctioned him by withdrawing his salary.

== Discography ==
- Dos extraños (1995)
- Otra vez el alma (2003)
- Ven a mi encuentro (2018)

== Tours and shows ==
- Fabiola...de suspiro y barro (2002)
- Todo el Perú (2014)
- Munay: la voluntad de amar (2016)
- Tuttay Quilla (2019-2020)
- Moliendas de sueños (2021)
