= Betty Missiego =

- Born: Beatriz Teresa Missiego Campos; 16 January 1938 (age 88); Lima, Peru
- Occupation: Singer

Beatriz Teresa Missiego Campos (born 16 January 1938 in Lima, Peru) better known as Betty Missiego (Spanish pronunciation: [ˈbeti miˈsjeɣo]) is a Peruvian singer, who has held dual Spanish citizenship since 1972 and lives in Spain. She represented Peru at the OTI Festival 1972 with the song "Recuerdos de un adiós" placing ninth and she represented Spain at the Eurovision Song Contest 1979 with "Su canción" placing second.

== Career ==
In her native Peru, Missiego began her career as a dancer, but she was forced to abandon professional dancing due to an injury. She continued pursuing a career in show business and was a host for a television program that brought her great popularity in her native country.

In 1969, she moved to Spain to pursue a singing career, where she received Spanish citizenship in 1972. She currently holds dual citizenship in both Spain and Peru.

On 25 November 1972, she represented Peru in the first edition of the OTI Festival, held in the Palacio de Exposiciones y Congresos auditorium in Madrid, with the song written by herself "Recuerdos de un adiós", placing ninth.

On 31 March 1979, she represented Spain at the 24th edition of the Eurovision Song Contest held in Jerusalem with the song "Su canción", written by Fernando Moreno. Betty was accompanied by four children –Javier Glaria, Alexis Carmona, Beatriz Carmona, and Rosalía Rodríguez– who sang 157 la's in the song, a Eurovision record. At the end of the song, each child unfurled a small banner, with "thanks" inscribed on each in English, Spanish, Hebrew, and French, respectively. Betty ended up in second place with 116 points, behind Israel's Milk and Honey with the song "Hallelujah". She also participated in the World Popular Festival in Tokyo and the Music Olympics in Paris. In 1980, she submitted another song, "Don José" to the Spanish selection committee for Eurovision, but it was not selected.

Her son Joaquín Missiego –known by his mononym "Missiego"–, is also a singer.

Preceded by none	Peru in the OTI Festival; 1972	Succeeded by Gabriela de Jesús with "El mundo gira por tu amor"
Preceded by José Vélez with "Bailemos un vals"	Spain in the Eurovision Song Contest; 1979	Succeeded by Trigo Limpio with "Quédate esta noche"
