= List of number-one hits of 1988 (Mexico) =

This is a list of the songs that reached number one in Mexico in 1988, according to the Notitas Musicales magazine with data provided by Radio Mil(which also provided charts for Billboard's "Hits of the World" between 1969 and 1981).

Notitas Musicales was a bi-weekly magazine that published two record charts:

- "Canciones que México canta" ("Songs that Mexico sings"), which listed the Top 10 most popular Spanish-language songs in Mexico, and
- "Hit Parade", which was a Top 10 of the most popular songs in Mexico that were in languages other than Spanish. For reasons unknown, the magazine stopped publishing the "Hit Parade" chart after April 1; the chart was again published on the 1 December issue, and then it was again discontinued until Notitas Musicales revived it in 1993.

== Chart history ==
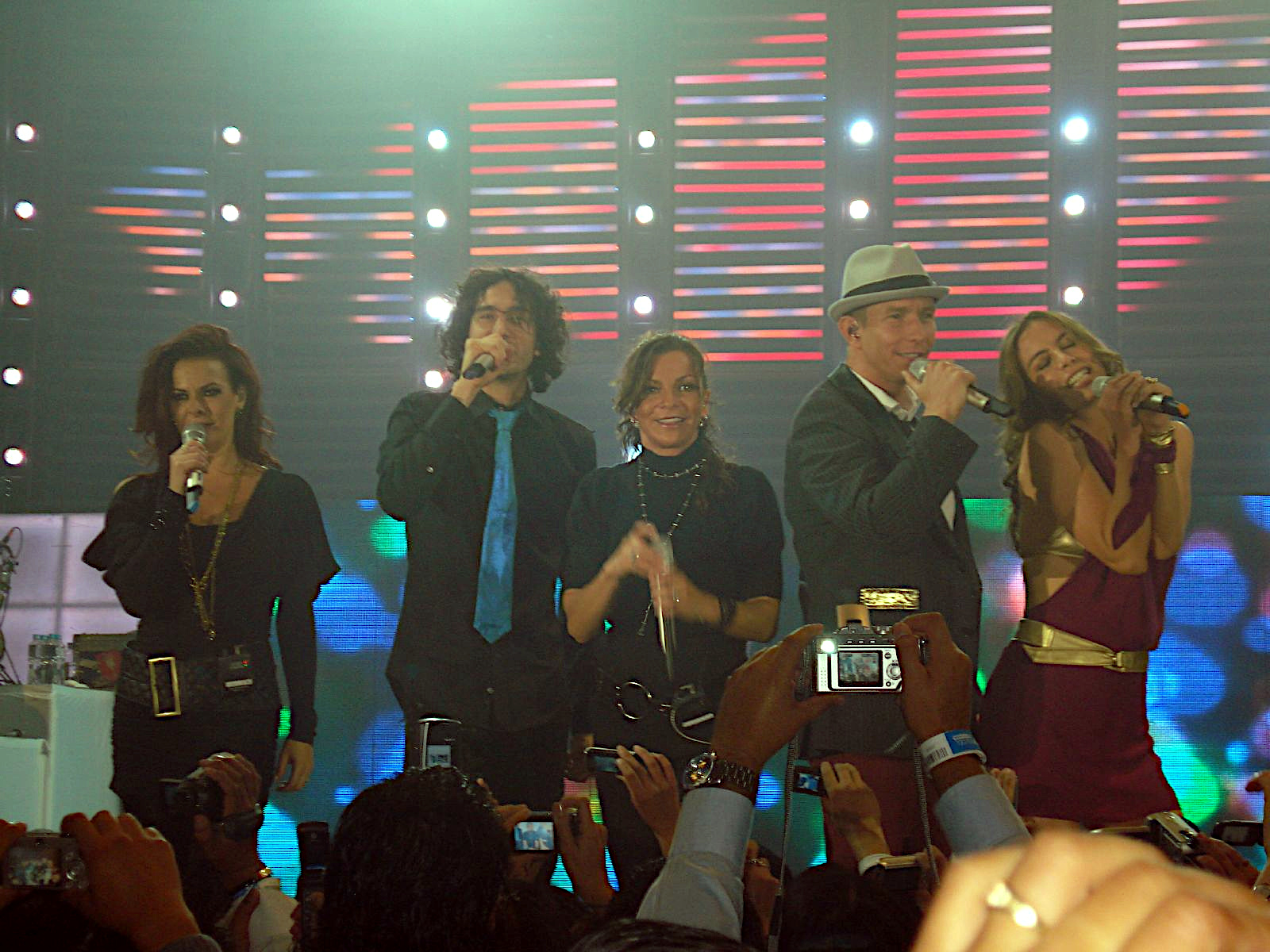
"Tú y yo somos uno mismo" by Mexican pop band Timbiriche (pictured) stayed 6 months at the #1 position.

Issue Date	Spanish-language songs		Songs in other languages		Ref.
Issue Date	Song	Artist(s)	Song	Artist(s)	Ref.
1 January	"Ahora te puedes marchar"	Luis Miguel	"La bamba" (Note: Despite this song being in Spanish, it was listed under the "Hit Parade" chart, perhaps because Los Lobos was a group based in the U.S. and not in a Spanish-speaking country.)	Los Lobos	
15 January	"Ahora te puedes marchar"	Luis Miguel	"La bamba"	Los Lobos	
1 February	"Ahora te puedes marchar"	Luis Miguel	"I Wanna Dance with Somebody"	Whitney Houston	
15 February	"Ay amor"	Ana Gabriel	"I Wanna Dance with Somebody"	Whitney Houston	
1 March	"Devuélveme a mi chica"	Hombres G	"I Wanna Dance with Somebody"	Whitney Houston	
15 March	"Devuélveme a mi chica"	Hombres G	"I Just Can't Stop Loving You"	Michael Jackson & Siedah Garrett	
1 April	"Devuélveme a mi chica"	Hombres G	"I Just Can't Stop Loving You"	Michael Jackson & Siedah Garrett	
15 April	"Devuélveme a mi chica"	Hombres G			
1 May	"Devuélveme a mi chica"	Hombres G			
15 May	"Devuélveme a mi chica"	Hombres G			
1 June	"Devuélveme a mi chica"	Hombres G			
15 June	"Tú y yo somos uno mismo"	Timbiriche			
1 July	"Tú y yo somos uno mismo"	Timbiriche			
15 July	"Tú y yo somos uno mismo"	Timbiriche			
1 August	"Tú y yo somos uno mismo"	Timbiriche			
15 August	"Tú y yo somos uno mismo"	Timbiriche			
1 September	"Tú y yo somos uno mismo"	Timbiriche			
15 September	"Tú y yo somos uno mismo"	Timbiriche			
1 October	"Tú y yo somos uno mismo"	Timbiriche			
15 October	"Tú y yo somos uno mismo"	Timbiriche			
1 November	"Tú y yo somos uno mismo"	Timbiriche			
15 November	"Tú y yo somos uno mismo"	Timbiriche			
1 December	"Tú y yo somos uno mismo"	Timbiriche	"Wild, Wild West"	The Escape Club	
15 December	"Acelerar"	Timbiriche			

== See also ==
- 1988 in music

== Sources ==
- Print editions of the Notitas Musicales magazine.
