= Canal 9 (Costa Rican TV channel) =

- Country: Costa Rica
- Broadcast area: Costa Rica

Programming
- Picture format: 1080i HDTV

Ownership
- Owner: Multivisión

History
- Launched: April 6, 1962; 63 years ago
- Former names: Tic Tac Canal 9 (1961-1993); Canal 9 (1993-2000); Spectamerica Canal 9 (2000s)

Availability

Terrestrial
- Digital VHF: Channel 9.1

Canal 9 is the second television station established in Costa Rica, having begun broadcasts on April 6, 1962 as Tic Tac Canal 9.

The station initially was a Sunday-only operation, as Teletica used it as a rest day for its staff.

In 1993, the channel was acquired by Remigio Ángel González becoming the first station owned by the then-new Repretel group. In February 1996, the channel aired reruns of El gran juego de la oca, whose legal rights were on channel 2. Antena 3, owner of the program, accused Repretel of supposed piracy over the contract.

It later sub-leased to TV Azteca and was sold in 2000. Repretel moved channel 9's programming to the newly acquired Repretel Channel 4, bought from TV Azteca in the same year. Afterwards, channel 9 was branded as Spectamérica.

From 2011 to 2015, the station was branded as canal nueve, and still carried TV Azteca programming as well as local shows. In September 2015, the local shows were cancelled as the channel was forced to quit 120 employees. There were speculations of a reacquisition of the channel by Repretel, but these were not true.
