= Organización de Telecomunicaciones de Iberoamérica =

Organization of television networks in Ibero-America

Organización de Telecomunicaciones de Iberoamérica / Organização das Telecomunicações Ibero-americanas
- Abbreviation: OTI
- Formation: 19 March 1971; 55 years ago
- Type: Union of broadcasting organisations
- Headquarters: Mexico City, Mexico
- Members: 46 members
- Official language: Spanish and Portuguese
- Director-General: Miguel Diez de Urdanivia
- Website: www.otitelecom.org
- Formerly called: Organización de Televisión Iberoamericana / Organização da Televisão Ibero-americana

The Organización de Telecomunicaciones de Iberoamérica in Spanish and Organização das Telecomunicações Ibero-americanas in Portuguese (acronym OTI), formerly known as Organización de Televisión Iberoamericana / Organização da Televisão Ibero-americana (transl. Organization of Iberoamerican Television), is an organization of Spanish and Portuguese-language television networks in Ibero-America –comprising Latin America, Portugal, and Spain; as well as Canada, Equatorial Guinea, Netherlands Antilles, and the United States–. Its original mission was to foster relations between television broadcasting companies in the region to share their knowledge and experience.

== History ==
=== Organización de Televisión Iberoamericana ===
Logo of the Organización de Televisión Iberoamericana

The Organización de Televisión Iberoamericana (OTI) in Spanish, also Organização da Televisão Ibero-americana (OTI) in Portuguese, was founded in Mexico City on 19 March 1971 as an organization of television broadcasting companies from Ibero-American countries. Its objective was to foster relations between the Spanish and Portuguese-language television broadcasters in the region, to share their knowledge and experience. Among other activities, it shared news, cultural, educational, and sports programming among its members. Its first president, in office between 1971 and 1997, was Guillermo Cañedo de la Bárcena.

Between 1972 and 2000, OTI organized the OTI Festival, an international song competition between its member broadcasters that was transmitted live via satellite to all of them, and which gave many famous artists and hit songs in the countries in which it was broadcast.

Between 1977 and 1983, Televisión Española (TVE) with the support of OTI, produced the weekly magazine 300 millones. This variety show, with musical performances, cultural and news reports, interviews, and contests, was broadcast in Spain and transmitted to the Spanish-language OTI member broadcasters via satellite.

TVE also conducted via satellite once every weekday the Servicio Iberoamericano de Noticias, the news exchange service between the OTI member broadcasters and the European Broadcasting Union (EBU)'s Eurovision news exchange service.

OTI secured the television broadcasting rights for its members in their countries of major international events such as the Olympic Games, FIFA World Cups, Copa América, etc.

=== Organización de Telecomunicaciones de Iberoamérica ===
In April 2016, OTI was renamed to Organización de Telecomunicaciones de Iberoamérica in Spanish, and Organização das Telecomunicações Ibero-americanas in Portuguese. Its members went from only television broadcasting companies to telecommunications companies in general.

== Full Members ==
Featured as in the OIT's members list

Country	Channels
Latin America	AT&T
Latin America	DirecTV
Latin America	Telefónica
Latin America	DNews
Latin America	DSports
Latin America	DSports 2
Latin America	DSports+
Latin America	DSports Fight
Latin America	Ve Plus
Latin America	Ve Plus USA
Argentina	Grupo Clarín
Bolivia	Unitel
Bolivia	Red Uno
Brazil	Bandeirantes
Chile	Chilevisión
Chile	Mega
Chile	Canal 13
Chile	TVN (Chile)
Colombia	Caracol
Colombia	RCN
Costa Rica	Teletica
Ecuador	Teleamazonas
Ecuador	Ecuavisa
Ecuador	RTS
El Salvador	Telecorporación Salvadoreña
Honduras	Corporación Televicentro
Mexico	Televisa
Mexico	TV Azteca
Mexico	Sky
Mexico	izz!
Mexico	Imagen Television
Mexico	Grupo Radiorama
Mexico	Grupo SIPSE
Mexico	Grupo Multimedios
Panama	Medcom
Panama	Telemetro
Panama	TVN
Paraguay	Trece
Peru	Latina
Peru	América
Peru	Panamericana
Peru	TV Perú
Peru	Grupo ATV
Spain	PRISA
United States	Telemundo
United States	Univision
United States	TelevisaUnivision
Venezuela	Venevisión

== Former members ==
Country	Channels
Latin America	DirecTV Brasil; DirecTV Plus; OnDirecTV; DirecTV Más; Venevisión USA; Venevisión Plus; ESPN Brasil; ESPN+; CNN International; CNN en Español; ESPN; PX Sports; Love Nature; ZooMoo; Sun Channel; DHE; Kanal D Drama
Argentina	Televisión Pública; Crónica TV; Radio y Televisión Argentina; América TV; Torneos y Competencias
Aruba	Telearuba
Bolivia	Bolivisión; Bolivia TV; Red ATB
Brazil	TV Globo; SBT; TV Tupi; TV Cultura; Grupo Globo
Canada	Telelatino
Chile	La Red; TV+
Colombia	Producciones PUNCH; RTI Producciones; Producciones JES; Datos y Mensajes; Inravisión; TIS Productions
Costa Rica	Repretel
Cuba	Instituto Cubano de Radio y Televisión
Curaçao	TeleCuraçao
Dominican Republic	Telesistema 11
Ecuador	Gamavisión; TC Televisión; Ecuavisa; Canal Uno
Equatorial Guinea	TVGE
Guatemala	Corporación de Radio y Televisión de Guatemala: (Canal 3; Canal 7; Canal 11; Canal 13)
Honduras	VTV; Canal 11; Televisión Nacional de Honduras
Nicaragua	Televicentro; TN8; Canal 10
Paraguay	SNT; Telefuturo
Portugal	RTP
Spain	RTVE
Uruguay	Canal 4; Canal 10; Teledoce
Venezuela	RCTV; Meridiano Televisión

== Soccer broadcasting rights ==
- FIFA World Cup
- Copa América
- UEFA European Championship
- UEFA Champions League
- UEFA Europa League
- UEFA Europa Conference League
- Copa CONMEBOL Libertadores
- Copa CONMEBOL Sudamericana
- CONCACAF Champions League
- CONCACAF League
- Argentine Primera División
- Paraguayan Primera División
- Uruguayan Primera División

== See also ==
- OTI Festival
- European Broadcasting Union
- Asia-Pacific Broadcasting Union
- Caribbean Media Corporation
- Ibero-America (Latin America)
- Miss Universe
