= OTI Festival =

Annual international song competition (1972–2000)

- Also known as: OTI Song Contest; La OTI
- Spanish: Festival OTI de la Canción / Gran Premio de la Canción Iberoamericana
- Portuguese: Festival OTI da Canção / Grande Prêmio da Canção Ibero-Americana
- Genre: Music competition
- Created by: Organización de Televisión Iberoamericana
- Based on: Eurovision Song Contest
- Countries of origin: List of countries
- Original languages: Spanish and Portuguese
- No. of episodes: 28 contests; 33 live shows

Production
- Production location: Various host cities
- Production companies: Organización de Televisión Iberoamericana; Various national broadcasters

Original release
- Release: 25 November 1972 – 20 May 2000

The OTI Festival (Spanish: Festival OTI de la Canción / Gran Premio de la Canción Iberoamericana, Portuguese: Festival OTI da Canção / Grande Prêmio da Canção Ibero-Americana), often known simply as La OTI, was an international song competition organised annually by the Organización de Televisión Iberoamericana (OTI) among its members for twenty-eight editions between 1972 and 2000. Each participating broadcaster submitted an original song representing its country, in Spanish or Portuguese, to be performed and broadcast live to all of them via satellite, and then there was a vote to determine a winner.

The festival was a spin-off of the Eurovision Song Contest for Ibero-American broadcasters, and it was preceded by the Festival Mundial de la Canción Latina, held in 1969 and 1970 in Mexico City. The first OTI Festival was held on 25 November 1972 in Madrid and the last one was held on 20 May 2000 in Acapulco. Since then, it has been cancelled due to the questioning of the voting system of the latter festivals, the lack of sponsors, the outdated style and low quality of the entries, and the withdrawal of some prominent countries. Broadcasters from twenty-seven countries participated at least once in the festival, with Chile, Panama, Peru, Puerto Rico, and Venezuela participating in all twenty-eight editions.

Performing at the festival provided artists with a local career boost and in some cases long-lasting international success. Several of the best-selling Ibero-American music artists competed with songs written by themselves or by others, including Ana Gabriel, Camilo Sesto, Ricardo Arjona, Dyango, Yuri, Lupita D'Alessio, and José Luis Rodríguez "El Puma". Many of the most renowned Ibero-American songwriters wrote competing entries, performed by themselves in some cases, including Manuel Alejandro, Claudia Brant, Juan Carlos Calderón, Roberto Cantoral, Lolita de la Colina, Emilio Estefan, Chabuca Granda, Juan Luis Guerra, Nelson Ned, Chico Novarro, and Cheo Zorrilla. The competing entries were mostly of the canción melódica genre, although songs in other genres such as Latin pop, tropical music, and traditional folk also competed.

The main goals of the festival were to generate a process of cultural and artistic fellowship between Spanish- and Portuguese-speaking countries, and to encourage the creation of original songs. It is the largest and longest-running spin-off of the Eurovision Song Contest, and produced many artists and songs.

== Background ==
After the Festival Mundial de la Canción Latina, which was held in Mexico City in 1969 and 1970, the Organización de Televisión Iberoamericana (OTI), which was established on 19 March 1971, created the Gran Premio de la Canción Iberoamericana–Grande Prêmio da Canção Ibero-Americana, as a televised international song competition for its member broadcasters following the format of the Eurovision Song Contest. The competition was named Festival OTI de la Canción–Festival OTI da Canção, and was also known as Festival de la OTI–Festival da OTI, or simply La OTI–A OTI.

The festival was created as a way of collaboration between the OTI member broadcasters, to generate a process of cultural and artistic fellowship between Spanish- and Portuguese-speaking countries, and to encourage the creation of original songs among their authors, composers, and performers.

== Participation ==
Participants in the OTI Festival: Entered at least once Never entered, although eligible to do so Competed as a part of another country, but never as a sovereign country

Participants colored by debut year

All members of the OTI were eligible to participate in the OTI Festival. Both state financed and private broadcasters from member countries of the Organization of Ibero-American States (OEI) were able to join OTI as full members. Since only one entry per country was allowed, in some cases, different broadcasters from the same country collaborated to participate, broadcast, and even host, the festival jointly.

The OTI Festival was held for first time on 25 November 1972 at the Palacio de Exposiciones y Congresos of Madrid. Broadcasters from thirteen countries took part in the first edition of the event. Spain, Colombia, Brazil, Venezuela, Panama, Portugal, Bolivia, Chile, Peru, Uruguay, Argentina, the Dominican Republic, and Puerto Rico were the debuting countries.

Following the first edition, the OTI member broadcasters from the rest of the Ibero-American countries progressively started taking part in the event. The festival expanded even further away from the traditional Ibero-American sphere, to the point that even the United States and Canada (which had large communities of Spanish and Portuguese speakers), the Netherlands Antilles and Aruba (which were Dutch but where Papiamento, a Portuguese-based creole language influenced by Spanish, was the most widely spoken), and Equatorial Guinea (which is a Spanish-speaking African country), had broadcasters members of OTI which took part in the competition. In 1992, the festival reached a record of twenty-five participating countries, which made the 1992 festival the biggest song contest in the world, even beating the twenty-three participants of the Eurovision Song Contest 1992.

Broadcasters from twenty-seven countries participated at least once in the festival, with Chile, Panama, Peru, Puerto Rico, and Venezuela participating in all twenty-eight editions. The participating broadcasters had sole discretion over the process they would use to select their entry for the festival. Some of them, such as those from Aruba, Chile, Cuba, Mexico, the Netherlands Antilles, and the United States, selected their entries through regular multi-stage televised national selections; while others selected their entries internally.

Year	Country making its debut entry
1972	Argentina
1972	Brazil
1972	Bolivia
1972	Chile
1972	Colombia
1972	Dominican Republic
1972	Panama
1972	Peru
1972	Portugal
1972	Puerto Rico
1972	Spain
1972	Uruguay
1972	Venezuela
1973	Mexico

Year	Country making its debut entry
1974	Ecuador
1974	El Salvador
1974	Guatemala
1974	Honduras
1974	Netherlands Antilles
1974	Nicaragua
1974	United States
1976	Costa Rica
1978	Paraguay
1986	Canada
1989	Aruba
1991	Cuba
1992	Equatorial Guinea

== Production ==
=== Format ===
Each participating broadcaster, or group of broadcasters participating together, submitted an original song representing its country, to be performed in a live television programme broadcast via satellite simultaneously to all of them. (Note: Although the participating broadcasters received the festival live, they were not obligated to broadcast it live in their respective countries.) In addition to be original, the songs in the competition had to be performed live accompanied by a light orchestra, have a maximum duration of three minutes, and the lyrics in Spanish or Portuguese. The festival was a one-night event, although on five editions (1991, 1994, 1997, 1998, and 2000) it was a two-night event with a semi-final and a final.

The programme was staged by one, or jointly by several, of the participant broadcasters and was transmitted from a selected venue in the host city. Although it was usually held in indoor venues such as theaters, auditoriums, or convention centers, the 1975 festival was held in a television studio, and the 1995 and 1997 festivals were held outdoors. The organizers provided a full light orchestra and a choir of backing singers to accompany all the competing entries. Each participating delegation could bring its own conductor to lead the orchestra in the performance of its entry, with the host musical director available to conduct those that did not bring their own conductor.

A draw to determine the running order was held in advance. The competing acts performed sequentially following that running order, and they were presented by the hosts who announced the name of the country, the song, the songwriter(s), the conductor, and the performer(s). Occasionally, these introductions were made by a guest celebrity. The show used to feature top-level guest artists who performed in the opening or interval act, and sometimes between the competing entries.

=== Hosting ===
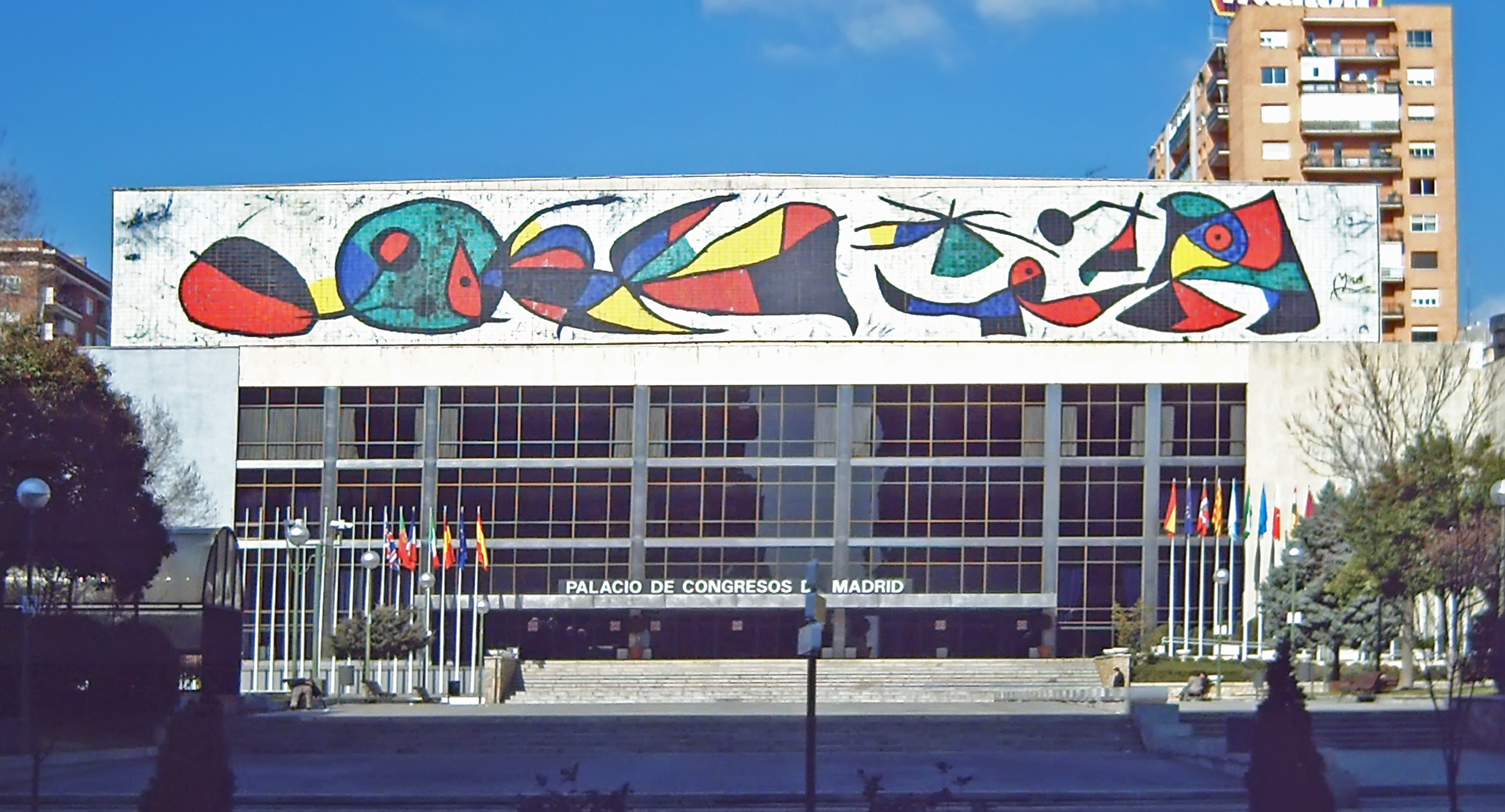
The Congress Palace of Madrid was the first venue of the OTI Festival.

The location of the festival was decided following two criteria throughout its history. Initially, the winning broadcaster would organize and stage the contest the following year. Because many participating broadcasters were suffering from political and economic instability in their countries, the OTI decided, just before the 1977 festival, to drop that rule and open a selection process to choose the host broadcaster starting with the 1978 edition, to which all its members were eligible to apply. The 1977 festival was won by Nicaragua, which was not able to host the 1978 festival due to the Nicaraguan Revolution, becoming the first to not be able to do so. The 1999 edition, which was going to be held in Veracruz, had to be suspended due to the severe flooding that occurred in early October in the country, which devastated the city.

Spain and Mexico were the countries that hosted the contest the most, with six editions each one. In total, the festival was hosted in thirteen countries, out of the twenty-seven that ever participated.

==== Editions ====
◇ Edition cancelled

Year	Date of Final	City	Venue	Presenter(s)	Host broadcaster(s)
1972	25 November	(Spain) Madrid	Palacio de Congresos y Exposiciones	Rosa María Mateo; Raúl Matas	TVE
1973	10 November	(Brazil) Belo Horizonte	Palácio das Artes	Walter Forster; Íris Lettieri	TV Itacolomi (Rede Tupi)
1974	26 October	(Mexico) Acapulco	Teatro Juan Ruiz de Alarcón	Lolita Ayala; Raúl Velasco	Televisa
1975	15 November	(Puerto Rico) San Juan	Telemundo Studio 2	Marisol Malaret; Eddie Miró	WKAQ-Telemundo
1976	30 October	(Mexico) Acapulco	Teatro Juan Ruiz de Alarcón	Susana Dosamantes; Raúl Velasco	Televisa
1977	12 November	(Spain) Madrid	Centro Cultural de la Villa de Madrid	Mari Cruz Soriano; Miguel de los Santos	RTVE
1978	2 December	(Chile) Santiago	Teatro Municipal	Raquel Argandoña; Raúl Matas	TVN; UTV; UCTV; UCVTV
1979	8 December	(Venezuela) Caracas	Theatre of the Military Academy	Eduardo Serrano; Carmen Victoria Pérez	RCTV; Venevisión; TVN; VTV
1980	15 November	(Argentina) Buenos Aires	Teatro General San Martín	Liliana López Foresi; Antonio Carrizo	ATC
1981	5 December	Mexico City	Auditorio Nacional	Raúl Velasco	Televisa
1982	27 November	(Peru) Lima	Teatro Auditorio Amauta	Humberto Martínez Morosini; Silvia Maccera; Pepe Ludmir	Panamericana Televisión
1983	29 October	(United States) Washington, D.C.	DAR Constitution Hall	Rafael Pineda; Ana Carlota	SIN
1984	10 November	Mexico City	Auditorio Nacional	Raúl Velasco; Pilín León; Claudia Córdoba	Televisa
1985	21 September	(Spain) Seville	Teatro Lope de Vega	Paloma San Basilio; Emilio Aragón	TVE
1986	15 November	(Chile) Santiago	Teatro Municipal	Pamela Hodar; César Antonio Santis	TVN; UTV; UCTV
1987	24 October	(Portugal) Lisbon	Teatro São Luiz	Ana Zanatti; Eládio Clímaco	RTP
1988	19 November	(Argentina) Buenos Aires	Teatro Nacional Cervantes	Pinky; Juan Alberto Badía	ATC
1989	18 November	(United States) Miami	James L. Knight Center	Lucy Pereda; Antonio Vodanovic; Verónica Castro; Carlos Mata; María Conchita Alonso; Emmanuel; Don Francisco	Univision
1990	1 December	(United States) Las Vegas	Caesars Palace Circus Maximus Showroom	Antonio Vodanovic; Alejandra Guzmán; Fernando Allende; María Conchita Alonso; Emmanuel	Univision
1991	14 December	(Mexico) Acapulco	Centro de Convenciones	Raúl Velasco (Note: Eduardo Capetillo, Gloria Calzada, and Rebecca de Alba presented the semi-final held on 13 December.)	Televisa
1992	5 December	(Spain) Valencia	Teatro Principal	Paloma San Basilio; Joaquín Prat	TVE
1993	9 October	(Spain) Valencia	Teatro Principal	Paloma San Basilio; Francisco	TVE
1994	15 October	(Spain) Valencia	Teatro Principal	Ana Obregón; Francisco	TVE
1995	11 November	(Paraguay) San Bernardino	Anfiteatro José Asunción Flores	Menchi Barriocanal; Rubén Rodríguez	Teledifusora Paraguaya
1996	14 December	(Ecuador) Quito	Teatro Nacional	Christian Jhonson; Ximena Aulestia	ACTVE
1997	25 October	(Peru) Lima	Plaza Mayor	Jorge Belevan; Claudia Doig	CPR
1998	14 November	(Costa Rica) San José	Teatro Nacional	Maribel Guardia; Rafael Rojas	Repretel
1999	20 November ◇	(Mexico) Veracruz ◇	N/A (Note: The event had to be suspended due to the severe flooding that occurred in early October in the country, which devastated the city.)	N/A	Televisa ◇
2000	20 May	(Mexico) Acapulco	Centro de Convenciones	Emmanuel; Andrea Legarreta; Bárbara Ferré; Gabriela Spanic; Nora Salinas (Note: Otto Sirgo and Susana González presented the semi-final held on 19 May.)	Televisa

=== Voting system ===
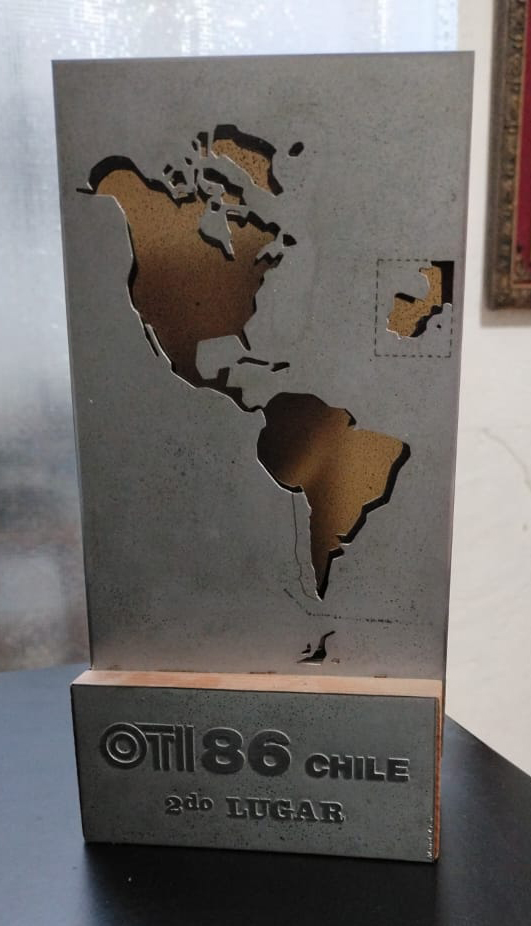
2nd place trophy awarded to "De color de rosa" by Prisma representing Mexico in 1986.

The voting system to decide the outcome of the festival changed over the years. Initially, voting was public, with a five-member jury assembled by each participating broadcaster(s) in their country casting their votes by telephone, and the counting being displayed on a scoreboard. Each jury member voted only for one song, which could not be the one representing their country, with the song with the most votes winning, and the second- and third-placed songs usually also being awarded. In 1977 the number of jurors per country was changed to three due to an increase of participating entries. In 1978, the voting was changed so that each country cast 1–5 points to its five favorite songs in order of preference. And in 1982, remote juries were abolished and each participating delegation appointed a single juror who was present in the hall instead.

Starting in 1983, voting became secret, with only the top three entries revealed at the end. That year, each participating delegation appointed a juror who was present in the hall and who scored all entries, except its own, between 1 and 5 points in a secret voting. From 1984 on, the outcome was decided by a professional jury assembled by the organizers composed by well-known music personalities, which was present in the hall and voted secretly.

=== Technological challenges ===
Since its very first edition, the festival was always produced in color and transmitted to the participating broadcasters live via satellite, even in the early years when most of them still only broadcast in black and white, and with a couple having to broadcast it tape-delayed because they did not yet have a satellite ground station or were within reach of one. Participation in the festival, its broadcasting and hosting, as well as the production of the national selections, posed a technological challenge that, in many cases, prompted them to introduce new broadcasting technologies, most of which were pioneering in their countries. Examples of this included the national selection of Chile in 1978, which was the first color broadcast via the national network of stations, in preparation for hosting that year's festival; or the national selection of the Netherlands Antilles in 1978 which was the first live broadcast outside of a studio and the first in which the cameramen followed a broadcasting script in the country.

The first edition of the festival also marked the first time in history that broadcasters from so many countries linked together via satellite to participate in a song contest. The live transmission of the festival had to deal with the different broadcast formats of the participating broadcasters, as some used the 525-line resolution system and others the 625-line system, and some used the PAL color encoding system and others the NTSC system, which required real-time conversions between formats.

On the other hand, the early editions of the festival suffered from the unreliability of the telephone networks in many of the participating countries and of the international phone calls between them, which caused some noticeable awkward situations during the voting segment when trying to communicate with the national juries located in their respective countries. As a backup measure, each participating delegation had a delegate present in the festival hall to stand in for its national jury in case communication proved impossible. This led to situations like the one in the 1974 festival, where more countries voted through their stand-in delegate than through their national jury.

== Entries and participants ==
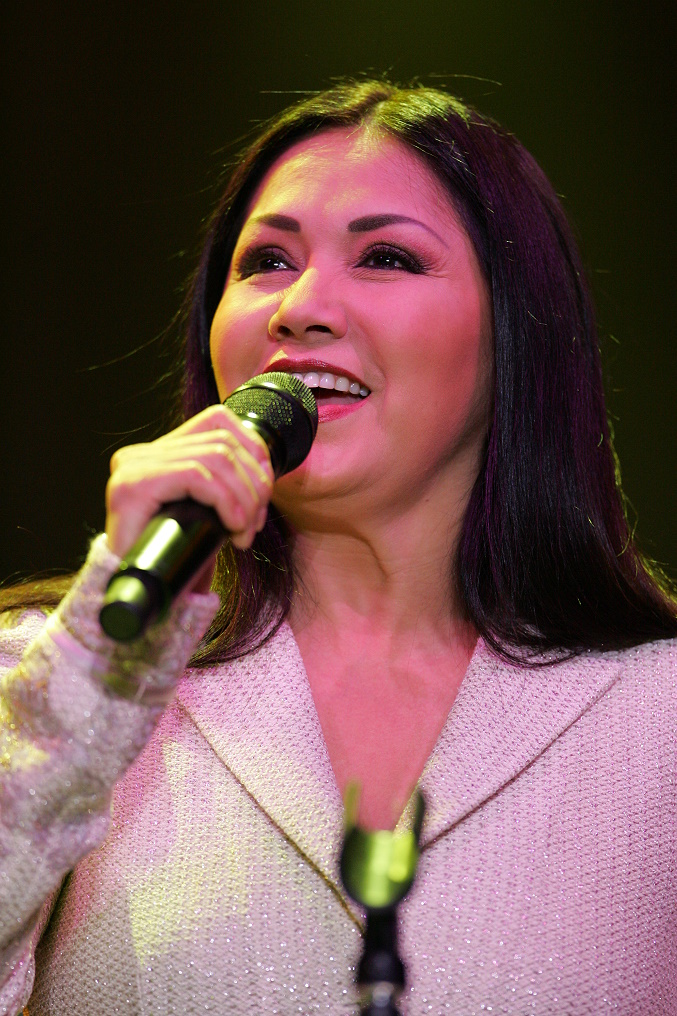
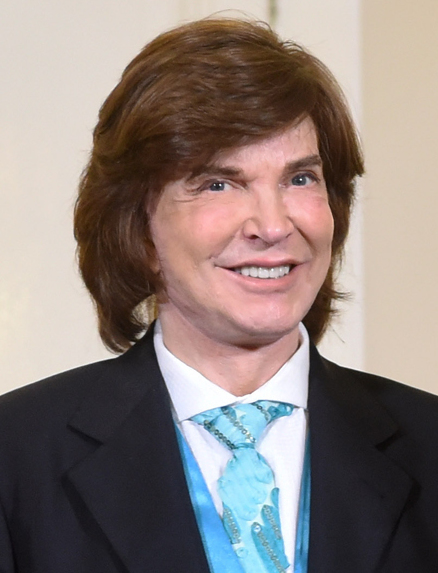
Mexican Ana Gabriel (pictured in 2006) and Spanish Camilo Sesto (pictured in 2017) are the best-selling participating performers.

The competing entries in the festival were mostly of the canción melódica genre, defined by sentimental ballads with light orchestra arrangements performed by singers with outstanding vocal qualities. Songs in other genres such as Latin pop, tropical music, and traditional folk also competed. Many of the most renowned Ibero-American songwriters wrote such entries, performed by themselves in some cases, including Manuel Alejandro, Claudia Brant, Juan Carlos Calderón, Roberto Cantoral, Emilio Estefan, Chabuca Granda, Juan Luis Guerra, Nelson Ned, Chico Novarro, and Cheo Zorrilla.

The festival was used as a launching point for artists who went on to achieve long-lasting international fame, and also a number of performers competed in the festival after having already achieved considerable success. Several of the best-selling Ibero-American music artists are counted among the OTI Festival participating performers, competing with songs written by themselves or by others. These included Ana Gabriel, who placed third for Mexico in 1987 with "¡Ay, amor!", written by herself; Camilo Sesto, who placed fifth for Spain in 1973 with "Algo más", written by himself; Ricardo Arjona, who placed twelfth for Guatemala in 1988 with "Con una estrella en el vientre", written by himself; Dyango, who placed second for Spain in 1980 with "Querer y perder", written by Ray Girado; Yuri, who placed third for Mexico in 1984 with "Tiempos mejores", written by Sergio Andrade; Lupita D'Alessio, who placed third for Mexico in 1978 with "Como tú", written by Lolita de la Colina; and José Luis Rodríguez "El Puma", who placed third for Venezuela in 1974 with "Vuelve", written by Pablo Schneider.

Competing songs have occasionally gone on to become successes for their original performers, and some were bestsellers and topped the charts in their home countries and in other countries. The aforementioned "¡Ay, amor!", in addition to topping the Spanish-language singles chart in Mexico for two weeks in February 1988, it topped the Billboard Hot Latin Tracks chart in the United States for fourteen weeks in early 1988 and became the best-performing Latin single of 1988. "Algo más" topped the singles chart in Spain for ten weeks in late 1973–early 1974.

=== Winners ===
Twenty-eight songs written by thirty-nine songwriters won the OTI Festival. Four songwriters won the competition twice: Venezuelan Luis Gerardo Tovar (for Venezuela in 1982 and 1987), Mexican Francisco Curiel (for Mexico in 1990 and 1997), and Spanish Chema Purón (for Spain in 1992 and 1996) and Alejandro Abad (for Spain in 1993 and 1995). Spanish singer Francisco is the only performer who has won the competition twice (for Spain in 1981 and 1992).

Winners of the OTI Festival
Year	Country	Song	Artist	Songwriter(s)
1972	Brazil	"Diálogo"	Claudia Regina & Tobías	Paulo César Pinheiro; Baden Powell
1973	Mexico	"Qué alegre va María"	Imelda Miller	Celia Bonfil
1974	Puerto Rico	"Hoy canto por cantar"	Nydia Caro	Nydia Caro; Ricardo Ceratto
1975	Mexico	"La felicidad"	Gualberto Castro	Felipe Gil
1976	Spain	"Canta cigarra"	María Ostiz	María Ostiz
1977	Nicaragua	"Quincho Barrilete"	Guayo González	Carlos Mejía Godoy
1978	Brazil	"El amor... cosa tan rara"	Denisse de Kalafe	Denisse de Kalafe
1979	Argentina	"Cuenta conmigo"	Daniel Riolobos	Chico Novarro; Raúl Parentella
1980	Puerto Rico	"Contigo mujer"	Rafael José	Ednita Nazario; Laureano Brizuela
1981	Spain	"Latino"	Francisco	Pablo Herrero; José Luis Armenteros
1982	Venezuela	"Puedes contar conmigo"	Grupo Unicornio	Luis Gerardo Tovar; Carlos Moreán
1983	Brazil	"Estrela de papel"	Jessé	Jessé Florentino Santos; Elifas Andreato
1984	Chile	"Agualuna"	Fernando Ubiergo	Fernando Ubiergo
1985	Mexico	"El fandango aquí"	Eugenia León	Marcial Alejandro
1986	United States	"Todos"	Dámaris Carbaugh, Miguel Ángel Guerra & Eduardo Fabián	Vilma Planas
1987	Venezuela	"La felicidad está en un rincón de tu corazón"	Alfredo Alejandro	Luis Gerardo Tovar; Arnoldo Nali
1988	Argentina	"Todavía eres mi mujer"	Guillermo Guido	Carlos Castellón
1989	Mexico	"Una canción no es suficiente"	Analí	Jesús Monárrez
1990	Mexico	"Un bolero"	Carlos Cuevas	Francisco Curiel; Pedro Alberto Cárdenas
1991	Argentina	"¿Adónde estás ahora?"	Claudia Brant	Claudia Brant; Sebastián Schon
1992	Spain	"A dónde voy sin ti"	Francisco	Chema Purón
1993	Spain	"Enamorarse"	Ana Reverte	Alejandro Abad; Josep Llobell
1994	Argentina	"Canción despareja"	Claudia Carenzio	Bibi Albert
1995	Spain	"Eres mi debilidad"	Marcos Llunas	Alejandro Abad
1996	Spain	"Manos"	Anabel Russ	Chema Purón; Eduardo Leiva
1997	Mexico	"Se diga lo que se diga"	Iridián	Francisco Curiel; José Manuel Fernández
1998	Chile	"Fin de siglo, éste es el tiempo de inflamarse, deprimirse o transformarse"	Florcita Motuda	Raúl Alarcón
2000	United States	"Hierba mala"	Hermanas Chirino	Angie Chirino; Olga María Chirino; Emilio Estefan

==== By country ====
Participants by number of victories

Songs from only nine of the twenty-seven participating countries won the OTI Festival. Mexico and Spain were the most successful countries in the history of the competition with six victories each while Argentina won the festival four times. Brazil was the fourth most successful country with three victories. Chile, Puerto Rico, Venezuela, and the United States won twice, and Nicaragua won once.

OTI Festival wins by country
Wins	Country	Years
6	Spain	1976, 1981, 1992, 1993, 1995, 1996
6	Mexico	1973, 1975, 1985, 1989, 1990, 1997
4	Argentina	1979, 1988, 1991, 1994
3	Brazil	1972, 1978, 1983
2	Puerto Rico	1974, 1980
2	Venezuela	1982, 1987
2	Chile	1984, 1998
2	United States	1986, 2000
1	Nicaragua	1977

== Legacy ==
Although the OTI Festival has not been held since 2000, it is still widely remembered in many countries, especially in Mexico, where the festival was always well received by the audience, even when its popularity was declining. It was enormously popular there thanks to the "National OTI Festival", which was the multi-stage national competition organized by Televisa to select its entry for the international contest. Some singers who became international best-selling artists, such as Juan Gabriel, Emmanuel, Lucero, Manuel Mijares, Joan Sebastian, Cristian Castro, or the girl band Pandora, tried to represent Mexico in the OTI Festival, but didn't win the national contest.

Both Televisión Española (TVE) in Spain and Radiotelevisão Portuguesa (RTP) in Portugal were members of the OTI and the European Broadcasting Union (EBU), so they were eligible to participate in both the OTI Festival and the Eurovision Song Contest representing their countries. The band Trigo Limpio represented Spain in the OTI Festival 1977 and in the Eurovision Song Contest 1980. Marcos Llunas won for Spain the OTI Festival 1995 and represented the country in the Eurovision Song Contest 1997, making him the only OTI winner to ever participate in Eurovision. Betty Missiego, who represented Peru in the OTI Festival 1972, represented Spain in the Eurovision Song Contest 1979. Numerous artists participated in both competitions representing Portugal, such as Anabela, Paulo de Carvalho, José Cid, Dora, Dulce Pontes, Adelaide Ferreira, Simone de Oliveira, and Tonicha. Other well known performers from these countries were Spanish Marisol, Cecilia, and Vicky Larraz; and Portuguese Lena d'Água.

Only one Eurovision winner has previously participated in the OTI Festival: Dave Benton, who represented the Netherlands Antilles in 1981 as Efrem Benita, won the Eurovision Song Contest 2001 for Estonia, with the song "Everybody" along Tanel Padar and 2XL.

In 1979, the Ministry of Education of Spain, with the support of UNICEF, organized the First Ibero-American Children's Song Festival (Spanish: Primer Festival de la Canción Infantil Iberoamericana) to commemorate the International Year of the Child. Ibero-American countries were invited to participate, of which fourteen accepted. Each of the fifteen countries (Note: Namely, in running order: Guatemala, Venezuela, Puerto Rico, United States, Panama, Costa Rica, Dominican Republic, Chile, Peru, Colombia, Argentina, Spain, Portugal, Paraguay, and Cuba) was represented by one, two, or three child singers selected from schools, who sang original songs, and had won the national pre-selections in their respective countries. The final gala was held on 20 December 1979 at the Teatro Real in Madrid, was presented by Marisol González and Pedro Meyer, and was broadcast live by TVE in Spain and by other OTI member broadcasters in Ibero-America. Although unofficially the festival has been called the OTI Children's Festival, it never actually had that name officially, since OTI did not organize it, it only broadcast it; and although it was titled "first festival", it did not have another edition either.

== Return attempts ==
As the mark of the OTI Festival in Latin America is still big, some organisations of diverse nature have tried to revive the festival. Some Mexican artists also made public their support to a return of the OTI Festival.

In March 2011, it was announced by some online newspapers that Televisa was preparing for the relaunch of the event in two stages, the first one, was to revive the "National OTI Contest", the Mexican national final, while the second one would be to revive the international and main OTI Festival. The aim of this attempt to bring to life the festival was to give the opportunity to young performers to show their talent. The festival at the end never took place, but it was neither cancelled.

In June 2016, it was announced the relaunch of OTI as a media organisation. The broadcasting union was renamed as "Organización de Telecomunicaciones de Iberoamerica" (Iberoamerican Telecommunications Organisation) evolving from a television content exchange platform to include members of a broader nature such as newspapers and telephone-internet companies apart from television and radio channels. This relaunch instantaneously sparked rumors about a possible relaunch of the festival that were later denied.

In 2017 it was announced the start of an organisation called "Organización de Talento Independiente" (Independent Talent Organisation) which in Spanish casually coincides with the acronym "OTI". The main goal of the organisation was to try to recreate the festival between Mexican singers and artists from the Latin community of the United States. Although the festival was not a competition between broadcasters of participating countries, the competition was held in the Mexican city of Puerto Peñasco.

In February 2022, Radiotelevisión Española (RTVE) announced Hispavision, a song festival where Spanish-speaking Latin American countries will take part alongside Brazil and Portugal as invited nations. The project was scheduled to start in 2023 and would be held in Cartagena, Colombia. In 12 July 2022, the EBU announced its expansion of the Eurovision Song Contest brand to Latin America. The planned contest would be produced by the same producers of other Eurovision spin-offs, including the American Song Contest. There was no further information on these projects after their announcement.
