= Repretel =

Representaciones Televisivas S.A.
- Trade name: Grupo Repretel
- Company type: Subsidiary
- Founded: 1994; 32 years ago
- Founder: Angel R. Gonzalez
- Headquarters: San José, Costa Rica
- Key people: Remigio Angel Gonzalez (Owner); Fernando Contreras (President)
- Owner: Albavisión
- Subsidiaries: Central de Radios; Nova Cinemas
- Website: https://www.repretel.com

Representaciones Televisivas (Televised Representations) S.A., commonly known as Repretel or Grupo Repretel is a Costa Rican media company, founded by Remigio Gonzalez, that came into competition with Teletica and Canal9. Repretel owns Costa Rican channels 4, 6, 11 and 2. Repretel began operating in 1993 with Channel 9, in 2000 the lease expired and moved to Channel 4. The company also operates 11 radio stations.

In 2012, Repretel bought Channel 2, from Mrs. Roxie Blen and branded the channel as CDR 2.

== TV Stations ==
=== Channel 6 ===
Channel 6 is the flagship TV station, carries the most popular shows, entertainment, sports and news of the network. The news has four daily editions. Included in the entertainment programs is 2 and a half hours of programs aimed towards women.

Repretel's Channel 6 has content similar to Teletica Channel 7's as they both mainly show United States shows and movies that are dubbed into Spanish. The Soap opera My Sin was broadcast on Repretel's Channel 6 in 2011 because television programming's head, Annette Mejias, said that she wanted to show more programs with independent women.

Repretel Channel 6 broadcasts the World Cup. During the 2006 World Cup, the channel's audience reported that the signal was poor. The cable company CableTica, which broadcasts the World Cup 24 hours after Repretel airs them, was accused of messing with the signal. Channel 6 also broadcasts the Mexican animated series El Chavo which is based on a live action show of the same name.

=== Channel 4 ===
Channel 4 mainly broadcasts programs aimed towards children along with films aired during the weekdays.

=== Channel 11 ===
Repretel's Channel 11 is on the air from midnight to noon with live footage of events occurring at night. When NBC lost the right to broadcast in Costa Rica, the 2008 Summer Olympics was broadcast by Repretel's Channel 11. Xpertv Channel 33 broadcast it as well.

=== Channel 2 ===
Channel 2 transmits live radio talk shows format, from CDR-Radio Monumental station. Operates under the name of CDR-2 Central de Radios

=== Additional Info ===
All channels have both local news and news from abroad. Repretel airs the Billboard Latin Music Awards.

In 2006, Repretel started using two Duet MicroX systems to broadcast their programs. Duet MicroX gives Repretel the ability to create graphics, animation, and news highlights easily.

Repretel's channels are programmed from Miami. Because of Repretel being based in Miami, the publisher of La Prensa Libre said that it could be harmful to Costa Rica culture. The company controls nearly 30 percent of Costa Rica's advertising.

== Radio Stations ==
Repretel owns 11 radio stations in Costa Rica, all branded as CDR Central de Radios, the most notable stations are Radio Monumental and Radio Reloj.

== Competition ==
In 2000, Repretel's channels directly competed with another Costa Rican media company, Teletica Channel 7. Even though Repretel had a large advertising revenue, Teletica came to dominate due to better ratings. The advertising revenue of Repretel in 2000 was $56 million. As a result of the competition between the two media companies, Teletica was prompted to upgrade its programming and equipment. A journalist believes that the quality of Repretel's channels may be "the manipulation of information" by an international media conglomerate.
