= Teletica =

Costa Rican television broadcaster

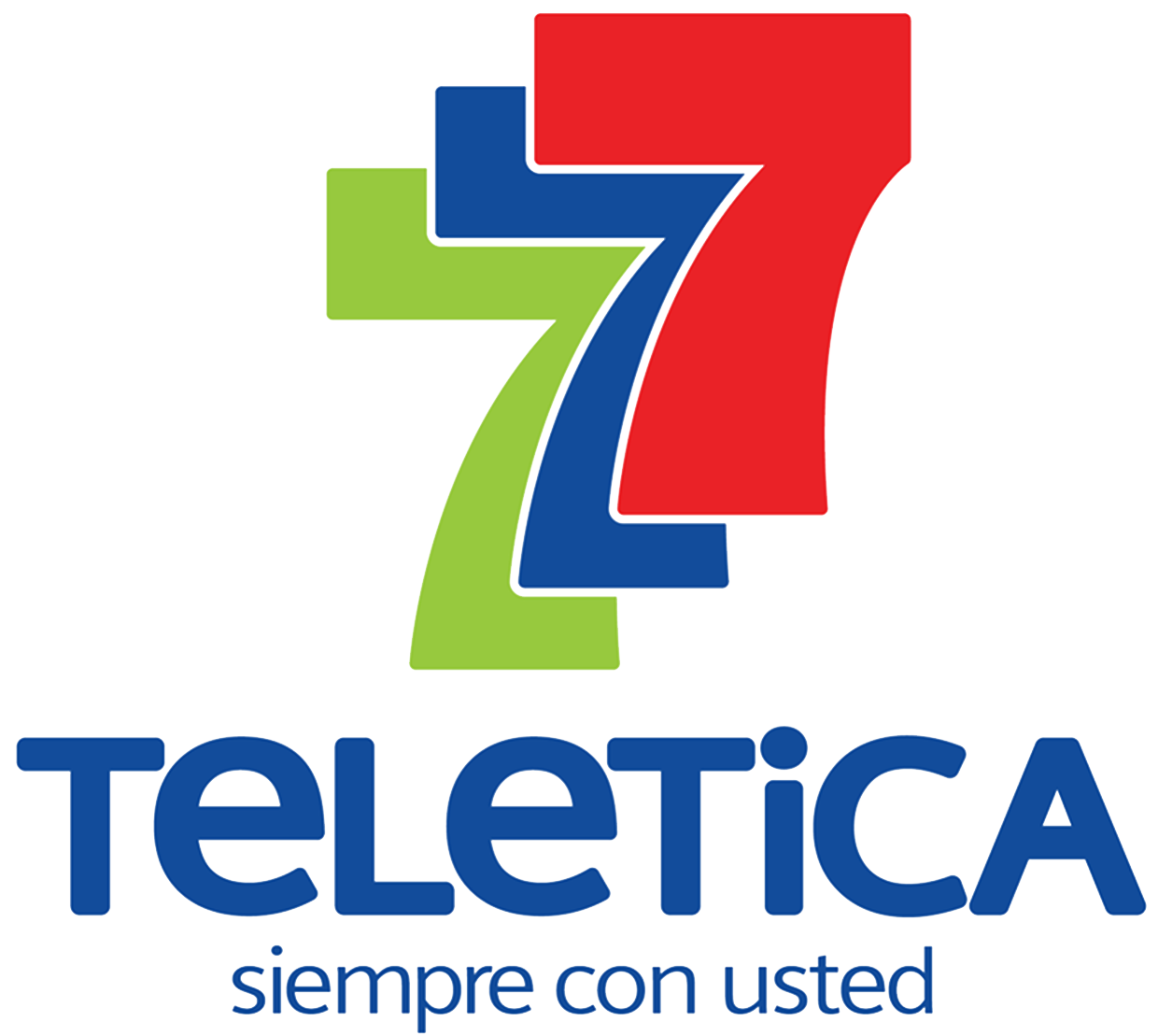
- Type: Spanish-language terrestrial television network
- Country: Costa Rica
- Headquarters: San José, Costa Rica

Programming
- Picture format: 1080i HDTV (downscaled to 480i for the SD feed)

Ownership
- Owner: Olga Cozza de Picado
- Key people: Rene Picado (General Manager)

History
- Launched: May 9, 1960; 65 years ago
- Founder: René Picado Esquivel

Links
- Website: www.teletica.com

Availability

Terrestrial
- Digital VHF: Channel 7.1

Televisora de Costa Rica S.A., known as Teletica, is a Costa Rican television broadcaster, founded in 1958. It operates Teletica Canal 7, XperTV Canal 33, and since 1991 (partially since 2018) CableTica (now called Liberty).

== History ==
In October 1958 an agreement was signed that gave rise to Televisora de Costa Rica S.A., Teletica Channel 7. Mario Echandi, President of Costa Rica, decided to grant licenses for public television. Two men were executive presidents, René Picado Esquivel and Carlos Manuel Reyes, with his wife Andreina Otalvaro.

On May 9, 1960, the first television broadcast was held. In the same year, the first newscast of Costa Rica would be created, called La Palabra de Costa Rica (the Word of Costa Rica), which one month later changed its name to what is now known as Telenoticias. In addition to the 6pm bulletin, a second bulletin, Noticiero Mundial Philips aired at 7:30pm, catering international stories. As late as 1962, the channel did not operate on Sundays, designated as a rest day for its staff. In 1962, Teletica transmitted the visit of then-US President John F. Kennedy. In 1963 the first mobile television unit was installed, which could expand the information programs live from outside the facilities. By 1965, Teletica became an anonymous Society. In 1969, the channel transmitted the arrival of the man on the moon.

Beginning in 1967 and the end of the 1970s, Teletica premiered several original programs and foreign productions on cultural, informative, educational and entertainment matters. The channel's mascot was a steam locomotive with a tender car with the number 7 on it, because the old studios and broadcast facilities were next to the railway line in the Cristo Rey neighborhood of San José, and this logo is still used in station bumpers between programming.

In 1969, Mr. René Picado Esquivel died, with his wife, Mrs. Olga Cozza de Picado, then occupying the Executive Presidency.

Between 1973 and 1975, 16mm films were replaced by videocassette tapes.

With the arrival of the public station channel 13, belonging to the National Radio and Television System, Teletica accepted the public role of television, but all the programs produced were financed in the private sector.

Thus, the government of President Daniel Oduber increased the participation of Teletica, so that all the programming could be original and the programs financed by the private and public sectors.

== Divisions ==
=== Teletica ===
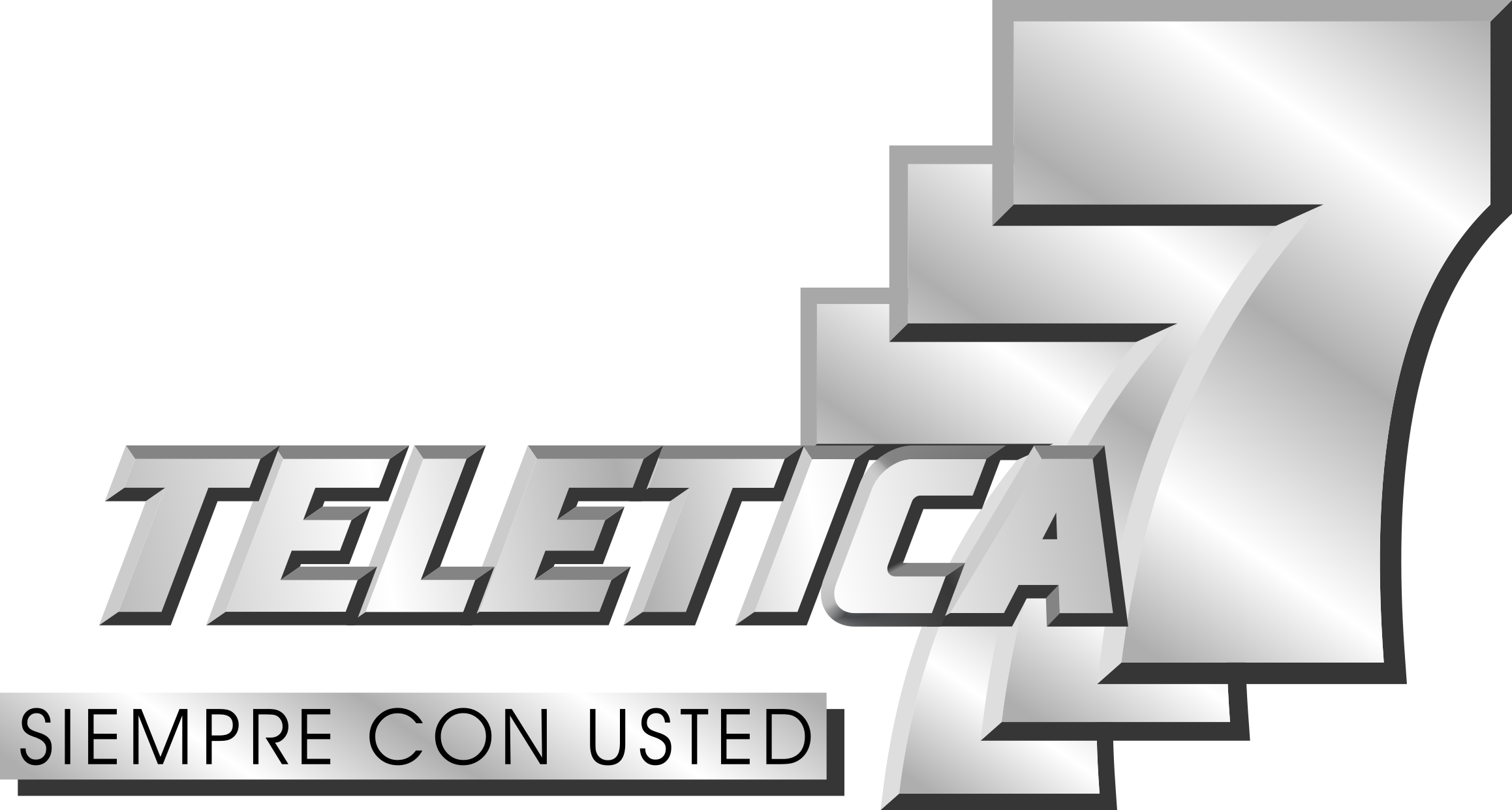
Teletica logo used from 2003 to 2015.

Teletica is the flagship TV station of the media group, the channel broadcasts programs from different companies. Main programming consists on local news show call Telenoticias, Buen Dia (morning show), Mexican and Colombian soap operas, US dubbed TV series and Costa Rica national football team friendly games.

==== TV series ====
- Hawaii Five-0
- CSI: Miami
- Chicago Fire
- FBI
- Bull
- Criminal Minds
- Seal Team
- Blue Boods

==== Journalistic, news and informative programs ====
- Telenoticias (1960-)
- 7 Días (1997-)
- Buen Día (1998-)
- Más que noticias +QN (2013-)
- Estado Nacional (2020-)

==== Spectacles ====
- 7 Estrellas (1999-)
- De Boca en Boca (2016-)
- ¡Que Buena Tarde! (2017-)

==== Comedy ====
- De Locos (2003-2007)
- El show de La Media Docena (2005-2017, 2020–2022)
- La pensión (1999-2021)
- Retumbos (2006-2007)
- Los enredos de Juan Vainas (2017-)
- Cuentos de hadas modernos (1993-1998)
- Caras Vemos (1999-2003, 2019-)
- JuanKa Ido del Cielo (2019-)
- Maikol Yordan: La Serie (2021-)

==== Reality shows ====
- Dancing with the Stars Costa Rica (2014-2019)
- Tu cara me suena Costa Rica (2015-2017, 2019-)

==== Interview programs ====
- Las Paredes Oyen (2014, 2018)
- Los Legionarios (2016-2018)

==== Contest programs ====
- Miss Costa Rica (1960-2023)
- Sábado Feliz (2000-)
- Miss Hawaiian Tropic (2002-2011)
- Piel Dorada (2001-2013)
- Fan7astico (1985-1995)
- Las Estrellas se reúnen (1960-1989)
- Burumbum (1996)
- TV Mejenga (1996-2004)
- A toda Máquina (2010-2012)
- El gran juego ATM (2013)
- El turno de la risa (2008-2009)
- El chinamo (2002-)
- El último pasajero (2015)
- Minuto para ganar (2011)
- Trato Hecho (2012-2013)

==== Sports ====
- Teletica Deportes
- Deporte+
- Football World Cup
- Costa Rica National Women's Team
- Friendly matches and playoffs from the Costa Rica national football team

==== Local Telenovelas ====
- La Cualquiera (2014)
- San Buenaventura (1993-1996)
- Agua dulce (1991)
- Los hijos del sol (1997)

==== Other programs aired ====
- Bailando por un Sueño broke the record in the Costa Rican television for being the most watched program in just one day.
- Siempre en Domingo
- Tu y Yo
- Sabado Gigante
- Duelo de Pasiones
- Serafin
- La Carabina de Ambrosio
- Anabel
- Que Crees?
- Agujetas de Color de Rosa
- El Privilegio de Amar
- La Güereja y Algo Más
- Tres Generaciones
- Mi Secretaria
- Chespirito
- Dr. Candido Perez
- Papa Soltero

=== XPERTV Canal 33 ===
The channel was established in 2009 and focuses to small and medium companies, airing lifestyle programming and minor sporting events.

=== TD+ ===
Pay television sports channel, launched in 2013, focusing on local sporting events. The channel was originally available only on Cabletica (now Liberty) however, it would later be included in other cable networks in Costa Rica.

=== Liberty ===
Originally known as Cabletica since 1991 until 2022, this has been the most popular cable network in San Jose, Costa Rica, including internet service and HD channels.

In 2018, 80% of its shares were purchased by Liberty Latin America, and Televisora de Costa Rica kept the other 20%. Due to the purchase of the Costa Rican franchise of the Spanish telephone company Movistar by Liberty Latin America, both companies were merged under the name Liberty.

=== Tuyo Movil ===
This was a joint venture with ICE and Teletica to enter into the mobile communications business. It included voice and data kits, using the Mobile virtual network operator technology.

=== Deportivo Saprissa ===
In 2011, Teletica became a major share-holder of the Deportivo Saprissa soccer club, after Jorge Vergara sold the team back to a group of Costa Rican businessmen.
