= América Televisión =

Peruvian broadcast television network

- Type: Broadcast television network
- Country: Peru
- Broadcast area: Peru
- Headquarters: Lima, Peru

Programming
- Picture format: 1080i HDTV

Ownership
- Owner: América Multimedia (formed by El Comercio (Peru) and La República (Peru)
- Key people: Eric Jurgensen

History
- Launched: 15 December 1958
- Founder: Nicanor González Vásquez, Avelino Aramburú and Antonio Umbert Féllez
- Former names: Radio América TV Canal 4 (Radio America(s) TV Channel 4, 1958–1964); Canal Cuatro (Channel Four, 1964–1969); C4 Televisión (1969–1977)

Links
- Website: www.americatv.com.pe (in Spanish)

Availability

Terrestrial
- Digital terrestrial television: Channel 4.1 (Lima, listings may vary)
- Analog VHF/UHF: Channel 4 (Lima, listings may vary)

América Televisión is a Peruvian television network, founded in 1958. The network is owned by América Multimedia, which is a joint venture of the El Comercio and La República daily newspapers. It was the second television channel to be founded in Peru, the first commercial station with regular broadcasts, and Peru's highest-rated network.

== History ==
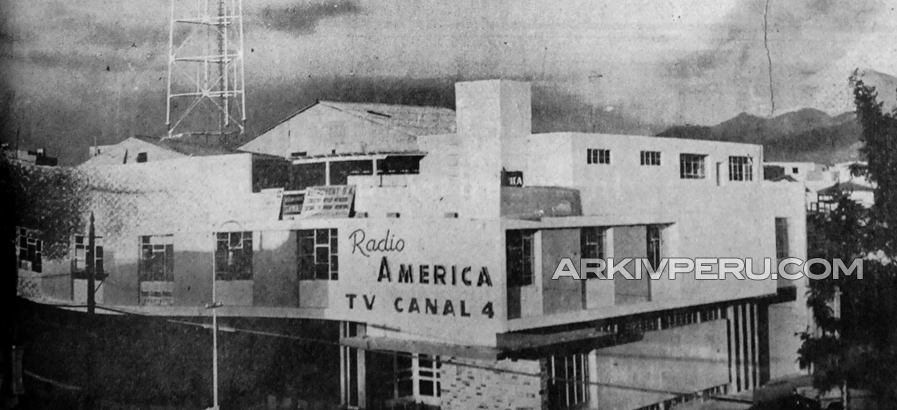
The front of the initial studio at the time of the first TV broadcasts in 1958.

The origins of América Televisión date to 1942, when the first radio network with private capitals in Peru, Compañía Peruana de Radiodifusión, S.A., whose owners were José Bolívar, Jorge Karković and Antonio Umbert, was formed. The network was made up of Radio Lima, Radio América, Radio Callao, Radio Miraflores, Radio Goicochea, Radio Délcar, Radio Universal, Radio Continental de Arequipa, Radio Huancayo, Radio Huánuco and Radio Cuzco (all shut down except Continental and Radio América). Its motto, at the time, was La organización de radio más poderosa de la costa del Pacífico Sur. The network's main stations were Radio Lima and Radio América.

Between 1943 and 1945, several changes at the company took place. Radio Miraflores and Radio Callao separated from the network, Radio Lima was sold to the Aramburú brothers; Bolívar and Karković leave the company in 1944, Radio América fell under Antonio Umbert and Nicanor González Vásquez, later founders of the television channel, and Radio Goicochea was sold to Genaro Delgado Brandt who, later, would relaunch the station as Radio Central.

In early 1955, Nicanor González and Antonio Umbert obtained a license to broadcast on VHF channel 4. Equipment was acquired from the Radio Corporation of America, whereas technical and production support was acquired from the National Broadcasting Company.

After the building of the headquarters and the installation of the studio and transmission equipment and a few technical delays, América Televisión, channel 4, began its test broadcasts on 27 October 1958 with a broadcast of little more than five minutes which featured an interview in the studios of the channel to Colombian Luz Marina Zuluaga, winner of the Miss Universe pageant. Its callsign was OAY-4D. Other test broadcasts were conducted in the weeks that followed.

The official channel launch occurred on 15 December the same year carrying the branding Radio América TV Channel 4 – it is today marked as the channel anniversary. Attending the first broadcast was then-Peruvian president Manuel Prado Ugarteche.

== Services ==
=== América tvGO ===
Created in 2012. Is an OTT platform with composed program of series, magazine and exclusive contents. The service is paid and the user must subscribe to be able to watch the network's productions and transmedia interactions such as receiving communication from some characters and voting in game shows.
