= Portugal in the OTI Festival =

- OTI Festival
- Participating broadcaster: Radiotelevisão Portuguesa (RTP)

Participation summary
- Appearances: 22
- First appearance: 1972
- Last appearance: 2000
- Highest placement: 2nd: 1984
- Host: 1987
- Participation history: 1972; 1973; 1974 – 1976; 1977; 1978; 1979; 1980; 1981; 1982; 1983; 1984; 1985; 1986; 1987; 1988; 1989; 1990; 1991; 1992; 1993; 1994; 1995; 1996; 1997; 1998; 2000

The participation of Portugal in the OTI Festival began at the first OTI Festival in 1972. The Portuguese participating broadcaster was Radiotelevisão Portuguesa (RTP), which was member of the Organização da Televisão Ibero-americana (OTI). It participated in twenty-two of the twenty-eight editions and hosted the 1987 festival. Its best result was second achieved in 1984.

RTP was member of the OTI and the European Broadcasting Union (EBU), so it was eligible to participate in both the OTI Festival and the Eurovision Song Contest representing Portugal. Many of the artists that took part in the OTI Festival for Portugal also represented the country in the Eurovision Song Contest, such as Anabela, Paulo de Carvalho, José Cid, Dora, Dulce Pontes, Adelaide Ferreira, Simone de Oliveira, and Tonicha.

== Participation overview ==
Table key
2	Second place
3	Third place
F	Finalist
SF	Semi-finalist
◇	Contest cancelled

Year	Song	Artist	Songwriter(s)	Conductor	Place	Points
1972	"Glória Glória Aleluia"	Tonicha	José Cid Tavares	Augusto Algueró	6	5
1973	"Poema de mim"	Paco Bandeira	Paco Bandeira	Ivan Paulo	12	2
1974	Did not participate					
1975	Did not participate					
1976	Did not participate					
1977	"Amor sem palavras"	Paulo de Carvalho	Joaquim Pessoa; Paulo de Carvalho	Thilo Krasmann	14	1
1978	Did not participate					
1979	"Na cabana junto à praia"	José Cid	José Cid	Jorge Machado	3	32
1980	"À tua espera"	Simone de Oliveira	Tozé Brito; Pedro Brito	Fernando Correia Martins	14	9
1981	"Uma lágrima"	José Cid	José Cid	Mike Sergeant	10	14
1982	Did not participate					
1983	Did not participate					
1984	"Vem no meu sonho"	Adelaide Ferreira	Adelaide Ferreira; Luis Fernando	José Calvário	2	—N/a
1985	"Um ano depois"	Jorge Fernando	Mário Martins; Jorge Fernando	Segundo Galarza	—N/a	
1986	"Adeus à praia"	Carlos Pedro	Rosa Lobato de Faria; Thilo Krasmann	Thilo Krasmann	—N/a	
1987	"Não me tirem este mar"	Teresa Mayuco	José Jorge Letria; Carlos Mendes	Fernando Correia Martins	—N/a	
1988	"Vivo a vida cantando"	Luis Filipe	Benis de Fonseca; Luís Filipe	Jaime Oliveira	7	6
1989	"Rosa morena"	Marco Paulo	Mário Martins; Nuno Nazareth Fernandes	Thilo Krasmann	—N/a	
1990	"Quero acordar"	Dora	Luiz Bernardo Tinoco; José da Ponte	Thilo Krasmann	—N/a	
1991	"Ao sul da América"	Dulce Pontes	Fred Micaelo; Zé da Ponte; Jorge Quintela	Thilo Krasmann	F	—N/a
1992	"Uma avenida inteira da saudade"	Cristina Roque	J. Pessoa; C. Mendes	Jaime Oliveira	—N/a	
1993	"Onde Estás?"	Anabela	João Dique; Marco Quelhas	Thilo Krasmann	3	—N/a
1994	"Eu quero um planeta azul"	Mafalda Sacchetti	Rosa Lobato de Faria; João Mota	Thilo Krasmann	7	6
1995	"Vê lá bem"	Pedro Migueis	Nuno Gomes dos Santos; Jan Van Dijck	Ramón Galarza	—N/a	
1996	"A minha ilha"	Elaisa	Luis Felipe; Johnny Galvão	Jony Galvao	—N/a	
1997	"Abandonada"	Ágata	Ricardo; J. Félix; Ágata	Víctor Salasar	SF	—N/a
1998	"Quem espera, desespera"	Beto	António Avelar de Pinho; José Marinho	José Marinho	3	—N/a
1999	Contest cancelled ◇					
2000	"Mar Portugal"	Lena D'Água	José Jorge Letria; José Marinho	José Marinho	F	—N/a

== Hosting ==
Year	City	Venue	Hosts
1987	Lisbon	Teatro São Luiz	Ana Zanatti; Eládio Clímaco

== See also ==
- Portugal in the Eurovision Song Contest
- Portugal in the Junior Eurovision Song Contest
