= OTI Festival 1998 =

27th OTI Song Festival

Dates and venue
- Semi-final: 13 November 1998
- Final: 14 November 1998
- Venue: Teatro Nacional; San José, Costa Rica

Organization
- Organizer: Organización de Televisión Iberoamericana (OTI)

Production
- Host broadcaster: Representaciones Televisivas (Repretel)
- Executive producer: José Luis Cacao Rojas
- Musical director: Álvaro Esquivel
- Presenters: Maribel Guardia; Rafael Rojas

Participants
- Number of entries: 23
- Number of finalists: 12
- Returning countries: Netherlands Antilles
- Participation map: Finalist countries Countries eliminated in the semi-final Countries that participated in the past but not in 1998

Vote
- Voting system: The members of a single jury selected their favourite songs in a secret vote
- Winning song: Chile "Fin de siglo, éste es el tiempo de inflamarse, deprimirse o transformarse"

The OTI Festival 1998 (Spanish: Vigésimo Séptimo Gran Premio de la Canción Iberoamericana, Portuguese: Vigésimo Sétimo Grande Prêmio da Canção Ibero-Americana) was the 27th edition of the OTI Festival. It consisted of a semi-final on 13 November and a final on 14 November 1998, held at Teatro Nacional in San José, Costa Rica, and presented by Maribel Guardia and Rafael Rojas. It was organised by the Organización de Televisión Iberoamericana (OTI) and host broadcaster Representaciones Televisivas (Repretel). The event was jeopardized by hurricane Mitch.

Broadcasters from twenty-three countries participated in the festival. The winner was the song "Fin de siglo, éste es el tiempo de inflamarse, deprimirse o transformarse", written and performed by Raúl Alarcón Rojas under his stage name Florcita Motuda representing Chile; with "Sin amor", written by Bibi Albert and Héctor Dengis, and performed by Alicia Vignola representing Argentina, placing second; and "Quem espera, desespera", written by António Avelar de Pinho and José Marinho, and performed by Beto representing Portugal, placing third.

== Location ==
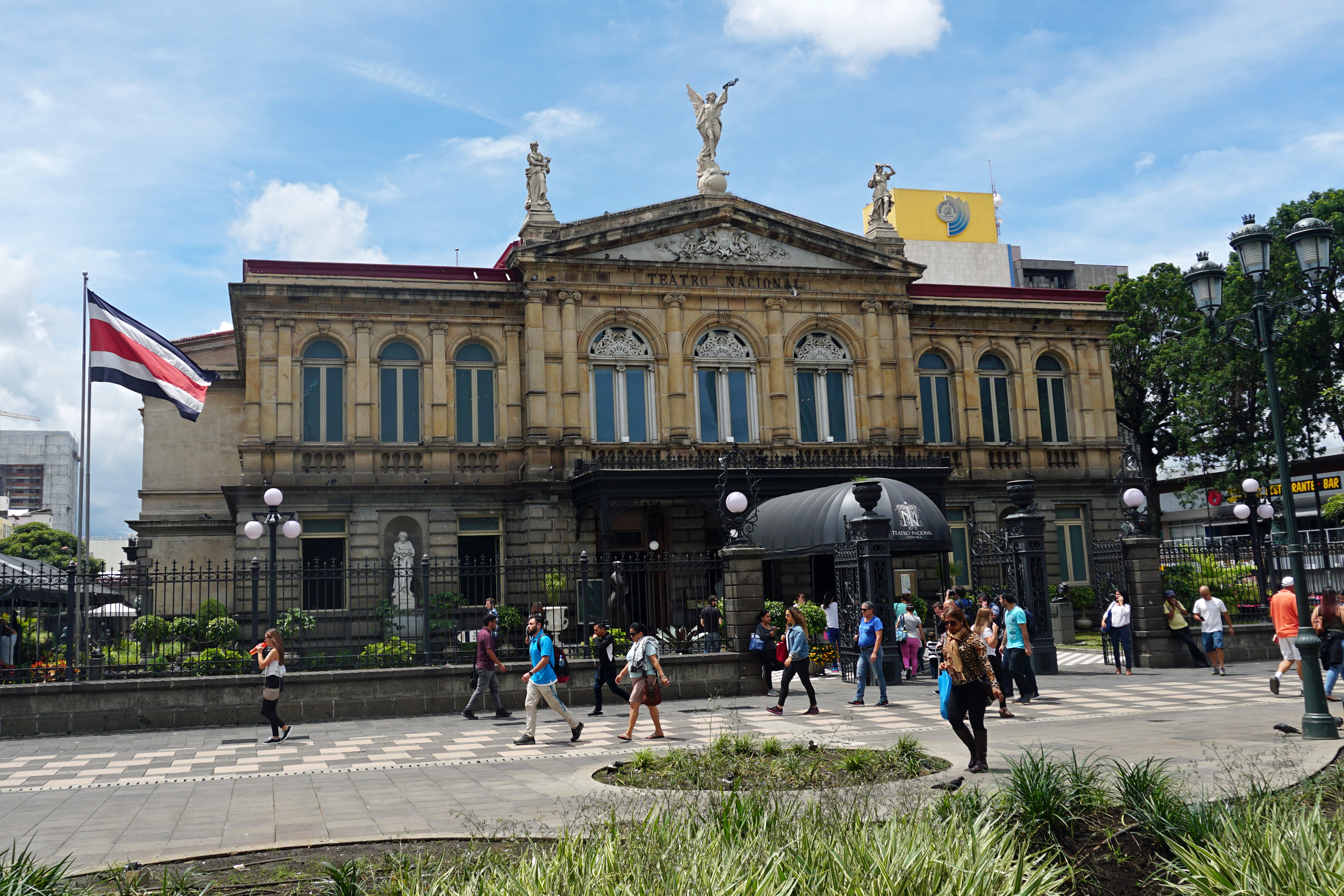
Teatro Nacional, San José – host venue of the OTI Festival 1998.

The Organización de Televisión Iberoamericana (OTI) accepted the proposal from Representaciones Televisivas (Repretel) to be the host broadcaster of the 27th edition of the OTI Festival. Repretel offered to be the sole host broadcaster following the withdrawal of Televisora de Costa Rica (Teletica), which staged the Costa Rican national final that year and did not want to take the risk of hosting after considering that it had been notified too late.

Repretel staged the festival in San José. The venue initially selected was the Melico Salazar Theatre, but it had to be discarded as it was too deteriorated and gave a bad impression. The production was relocated to the Teatro Nacional, which was able to change the dates of the activities already scheduled and free up a whole week for the preparations. During the festival, 800 guests attended the event inside the theatre main hall. Outside the building, a platform was set up as a secondary stage for some of the guest performances, and a grandstand for an additional 400 guests who followed the event on two giant screens located in front of the Gran Hotel.

The celebration of the event was jeopardized when hurricane Mitch devastated the continent between 22 October and 9 November 1998, becoming one of the most intense and deadliest hurricanes of the 20th century. The OTI itself donated US$20,000 for the victims of the hurricane, and the audience was encouraged to make donations during the broadcast.

On 9 November, a welcome cocktail was held at San José Palacio Hotel upon the arrival of the participating delegations. On 11 November, they were presented to the press at that same hotel in the afternoon, and attended an official reception presided by Astrid Fischel Volio, vice president of Costa Rica and minister of culture, youth, and sports, at the National Culture Centre after sunset. On 12 November, they attended a traditional dinner at Pueblo Antiguo in Parque Diversiones; on 13 November, they had a dinner at Le Chandelier restaurant right after the semi-final; and on 14 November, the Costa Rican Tourism Board hosted a gala dinner for 300 guests at the Pre-Columbian Gold Museum right after the final, presided by Aida Faingezicht Waisleder, minister of turism, where they enjoyed a menu prepared by Marcela de Quirce.

== Participants ==
Broadcasters from twenty-three countries participated in this edition of the OTI festival. The OTI members, public or private broadcasters from Spain, Portugal, and twenty-one Spanish and Portuguese speaking countries of Ibero-America signed up for the festival. All the countries that participated the previous edition returned, joined by the Netherlands Antilles which returned after being absent since 1995.

Some of the participating broadcasters, such as those representing Argentina, Chile, Costa Rica, and Mexico, selected their entries through their regular national televised competitions. Other broadcasters decided to select their entry internally.

Two performing artists had previously represented the same country in previous editions: María Elisa had represented Uruguay in 1974, and Florcita Motuda had represented Chile in 1978 and in 1981.

Participants of the OTI Festival 1998
Country	Broadcaster(s)	Song	Artist	Songwriter(s)	Language	Conductor
Argentina	ATC	"Sin amor"	Alicia Vignola	Bibi Albert; Héctor Dengis	Spanish	Álvaro Esquivel
Bolivia		"El canto de las aves"	Fabio Zambrana	Fabio Zambrana	Spanish	César Scotta
Chile	CCT	"Fin de siglo, éste es el tiempo de inflamarse, deprimirse o transformarse"	Florcita Motuda	Raúl Alarcón Rojas	Spanish	Olivia Alarcón
Colombia		"Amor por Latinoamérica"	Natalia Ramírez	Nelson Osorio; Jaime Valencia	Spanish	Diego Delgado
Costa Rica	Teletica	"Vendiendo ilusiones"	Ana Yancy Contreras and Luis Duvalier Quirós	Edwin Bonillas Rojas	Spanish	Carlos Guzmán
Cuba	ICRT	"Un sueño loco"	Osnel Odit Bavastro	Raúl E. Pérez de la Rosa	Spanish	Álvaro Esquivel
Dominican Republic		"Me levanto"	Claudine Bono	Manuel Jiménez	Spanish	Manuel Tejada
Ecuador		"Fíjate"	Fabricio Espinoza	Jorge Mahuad; Miguel Mora	Spanish	Rolando Valladares
El Salvador	TCS	"Año 2000"	Julio Roberto Hernández	Enrique González E.	Spanish	Álvaro Esquivel
Guatemala		"Sueño de smog"	Nelson Leal	Mario Vallar; Nelson Leal	Spanish	Roberto Estrada
Honduras		"Mi otra mitad"	Carlos Alberto Durón	Carlos Alberto Durón	Spanish	Camilo Corea
Mexico	Televisa	"Voy a volverme loco"	Fernando Ibarra	Gerardo Flores	Spanish	Alejandro Hernández
Netherlands Antilles	ATM	"Los niños"	Fusión Consonante	Lucille Berry-Haseth; Erroll Colina	Spanish	Errol Colina
Nicaragua		"Somos"	Trío Tabú	Peter Vivas; Jaime Delgado	Spanish	Jaime Delgado
Panama		"Por la vida"	Luis Arteaga	Rómulo Castro; Dino Luget	Spanish	Álvaro Esquivel
Paraguay		"No lo digas"	Americanta	Victor Hugo Echeverría; Zuny Ramos; Walter García	Spanish	Álvaro Esquivel
Peru		"Te llevo en el alma"	Lupe Eslava	Elena Romero; Lucho González	Spanish	Álvaro Esquivel
Portugal	RTP	"Quem espera, desespera"	Beto	António Avelar de Pinho; José Marinho	Portuguese	José Marinho
Puerto Rico	Telemundo Puerto Rico	"Yo te propongo"	Arianna	Jonathan Dwayne; Ito Serrano	Spanish	Miguel Cubano
Spain	TVE	"Desconocidos"	Luis Villa	Luis Villa	Spanish	Manuel Marvizón
United States	Univision	"Un ángel en mi habitación"	Carlos Abac	Carlos Abac	Spanish	Diego Fiamingo
Uruguay	Sociedad Televisora Larrañaga	"Razones"	María Elisa	Carlos Fernández	Spanish	Julio Frade
Venezuela		"Mas allá"	Asdrúbal Astudillo	Erick Gabriel	Spanish	Alejandro Salas

== Festival overview ==
The festival consisted of a semi-final on Friday 13 November and a final on Saturday 14 November 1998. It was presented by Maribel Guardia and Rafael Rojas. The musical director was Álvaro Esquivel, who conducted the 60-piece Costa Rica Philharmonic Orchestra, assembled specifically for the occasion, when required; and the mixed choir of four voices. (Note: The backing singers were Michael Mars, Rocío Campos, Roberto Rooper Cisneros, and Rossana Telford (who represented Costa Rica in 1991 as a member of the group Angelus).) Eleven television cameras, positioned both inside and outside the theater, were used to broadcast the festival. The event had a cost of ₡79 million, of which ₡34 million were spent on the orchestra alone.

=== Semi-final ===
The semi-final was held on Friday 13 November 1998, beginning at 19:00 CST (01:00+1 UTC). The show featured guest performances by Curime, Jazz Garbo, Manú, Carlos Cuevas, Iridián, Carlos Mejía Godoy, Erick León, and the Costa Rican National Dance Company. The twenty-three participating entries were performed in the semi-final, of which only twelve advanced to the final, with Costa Rica having a guaranteed place in the final as the host country. Later that night, the organizing committee held a draw to determine the running order (R/O) in the final.

=== Final ===
The final was held on Saturday 14 November 1998, beginning at 19:00 CST (01:00+1 UTC). The opening act featured the song "Bienvenidos", written for the occasion by Álvaro Esquivel, and a medley of well-known songs titled "Suite iberoamericana", both performed by Ricardo Padilla and the members of the backing choir; and a three-minute documentary film about the natural beauty of Costa Rica directed by Édgar Silva. The show featured guest performances by Marta Sánchez, Rubén Blades, Cristian Castro, Mercurio, Pimpinela, Soraya, and Emmanuel.

The winner was the song "Fin de siglo, éste es el tiempo de inflamarse, deprimirse o transformarse", written and performed by Raúl Alarcón Rojas under his stage name Florcita Motuda representing Chile; with "Sin amor", written by Bibi Albert and Héctor Dengis, and performed by Alicia Vignola representing Argentina, placing second; and "Quem espera, desespera", written by António Avelar de Pinho and José Marinho, and performed by Beto representing Portugal, placing third. There was a statuette designed by Miguel Ortuño for the winner. The first prize was delivered by Astrid Fischel Volio and Miguel Alemán, president of OTI. The first prize was endowed with a monetary amount of US$30,000, the second prize of US$20,000, and the third prize of US$10,000. The festival ended with a reprise of the winning entry.

Winner

Results of the final of the OTI Festival 1998
R/O	Country	Song	Artist	Place
1	United States	"Un ángel en mi habitación"	Carlos Abac	—N/a
2	Uruguay	"Razones"	María Elisa	—N/a
3	Argentina	"Sin amor"	Alicia Vignola	2
4	Costa Rica	"Vendiendo ilusiones"	Ana Yancy Contreras and Luis Duvalier Quirós	—N/a
5	Venezuela	"Mas allá"	Asdrúbal Astudillo	—N/a
6	Chile	"Fin de siglo, éste es el tiempo de inflamarse, deprimirse o transformarse"	Florcita Motuda	1
7	Mexico	"Voy a volverme loco"	Fernando Ibarra	—N/a
8	Cuba	"Un sueño loco"	Osnel Odit Bavastro	—N/a
9	Guatemala	"Sueño de smog"	Nelson Leal	—N/a
10	Portugal	"Quem espera, desespera"	Beto	3
11	Dominican Republic	"Me levanto"	Claudine Bono	—N/a
12	Spain	"Desconocidos"	Luis Villa	—N/a

=== Jury ===
The members of a single jury selected their favourite songs in a secret vote. In the final only the top three places were revealed. The members of the jury were:

- Marta Sánchez – singer
- Emmanuel – singer
- Carlos Mejía Godoy – singer-songwriter, represented Nicaragua in 1980 and wrote the winning entry in 1977
- Soraya – singer-songwriter
- Iridián – singer, won the festival for Mexico in 1997
- Patricio González – telenovela director
- Claudia Poll – swimmer
- Orlando Bertarini – composer
- Carlos Ribeiro – television presenter
- Benjamín Gutiérrez – composer

== Broadcast ==
The festival was broadcast in the 23 participating countries where the corresponding OTI member broadcasters relayed the contest through their networks after receiving it live via satellite.

Known details on the broadcasts in each country, including the specific broadcasting stations and commentators are shown in the tables below.

Broadcasters and commentators in participating countries
Country	Broadcaster	Channel(s)	Show(s)	Commentator(s)	Ref.
Argentina	ATC	Canal 7	Final (Note: Delayed broadcast on 15 November at 22:00 DST (01:00+1 UTC))		
Costa Rica	Repretel	Canal 6	All shows		
Costa Rica	Repretel	Canal 9	All shows		
Spain	TVE	La Primera	All shows	José Luis Uribarri	
