= Mexico in the OTI Festival 1998 =

- OTI Festival 1998
- Participating broadcaster: Televisa
- Country: Mexico
- Selection process: National OTI Festival
- Selection date: 20 August 1998

Competing entry
- Song: "Voy a volverme loco"
- Artist: Fernando Ibarra
- Songwriter: Gerardo Flores

Placement
- Semi-final result: Qualified
- Final result: Finalist

Participation chronology
◄1997 •	1998	• 2000►

Mexico was represented at the OTI Festival 1998 with the song "Voy a volverme loco", written by Gerardo Flores, and performed by Fernando Ibarra. The Mexican participating broadcaster, Televisa, selected its entry through a national televised competition with several phases. The song, qualified from the semi-final, was not among the top-three places revealed in the final.

== National stage ==
Televisa held a national competition with three televised qualifying rounds and a final to select its entry for the 27th edition of the OTI Festival. More than three thousand songs were received from 697 songwriters, of which 27 were selected for the televised National OTI Festival. In addition to the general competition, awards were given for Best Performer, and Best Musical Arrangement.

The selection was held within the show Al ritmo de la noche presented by Jorge Ortiz de Pinedo and broadcast on El Canal de las Estrellas. The musical director was Nando Hernández, who conducted the orchestra when required. The shows were also aired on the radio on Grupo ACIR, Radiópolis, Grupo Radio Centro, Grupo Radio Mil, Radio Fórmula, Multivisión, Radio Chapultepec, Radio Red, and Radio Raza.

Competing entries on the National OTI Festival – Mexico 1998 (Note: Incomplete list of the competing entries.)
Song	Artist	Songwriter(s)	Conductor
"Bájame de la nube"	Máscara de plata	José Luis Almada	Nando Hernández
"Cachito"	Adriana Zerpa	Alejandro Segovia	Nando Hernández
"Corazón"	Marlís Eileen	Alan Trigo; Juan Luis Broissin	Nando Hernández
"Cuentos Compartidos"	Alejandro Filio	Alejandro Filio	
"Definiciones"	Tere de la Torre, Muriel y Ángel	Miguel Ángel Solá; Raúl Rodríguez	Nando Hernández
"Nada más por hoy"	Sofía Miranda y Yoshio	Felipe Gil	Luigi Lazareno
"Ni timbales ni cuerdas"	Frida	Amparo Rubín	Alberto Núñez
"Otra vez la soledad"	Jade	Mónica Vélez; Carlos Arriola	Ricardo Martín
"Recordar sin amar"	Herik Guecha	Herik Guecha	Nando Hernández
"Se me muere el alma"	Gerardo Flores	Gerardo Flores	Nando Hernández
"Señora"	Matiz	Jorge Castro II; César Guerrero	Nando Hernández
"Siempre sin tu amor"	Paco Cobos	Alan Trigo; Eduardo Lira; Juan Luis Broissin	Nando Hernández
"Sin decir palabra"	Sergio Arzate	Fernando Riba; Kiko Campos	Nando Hernández
"Sólo se ama una vez"	Norma Uranga	Jorge García Castil	Nando Hernández
"Voy a volverme loco"	Fernando Ibarra	Gerardo Flores	

=== Qualifying rounds ===
The three qualifying rounds were held on Thursdays 30 July, and 6 and 13 August 1998. Each round featured nine entries, of which the two highest-scoring advanced to the final. The two remaining places in the final were taken by the two highest-scoring songs among those not qualified in the three rounds.

The same nine-member jury scored all entries in all shows, considering the lyrics, music, originality, and national and international marketing potential. The nine jurors were: Iridián (who represented Mexico in 1997), Adriana Riveramelo, Filemón Arcos Suárez, Joaquín Díaz, Eduardo Quijano, Raúl Ríos Olvera, Gino Gallegos, Jaime Almeida, and Roberto Cantoral as chairperson. (Note: Cantoral was absent from the first round and was replaced by Gil Rivera.)

The first qualifying round featured a guest performance by comedian Teo González. Each round ended with the reprise of the two qualified songs.

Qualifier

Result of the first qualifying round of the National OTI Festival – Mexico 1998
R/O	Song	Artist	Score	Result
1	"Ni timbales ni cuerdas"	Frida	25.42	—N/a
2	"Siempre sin tu amor"	Paco Cobos	31.00	—N/a
3	"Sin decir palabra"	Sergio Arzate	32.14	Qualified
4	"Se me muere el alma"	Gerardo Flores	29.28	—N/a
5	"Cuentos Compartidos"	Alejandro Filio	33.28	Qualified
6	"Bájame de la nube"	Máscara de plata	27.71	—N/a
7	"Definiciones"	Tere de la Torre, Muriel y Ángel	30.57	—N/a
8	"Sólo se ama una vez"	Norma Uranga	25.85	—N/a
9	"Corazón"	Marlís Eileen	28.57	—N/a

Result of the second qualifying round of the National OTI Festival – Mexico 1998
R/O	Song	Artist	Score	Result
1		Crystal		
2	"Nada más por hoy"	Sofía Miranda y Yoshio		
3		Carlos Estrada		
5		Jesús Monárrez		
7		Sheila Ríos		
8	"Recordar sin amar"	Herik Guecha		
9		Sin daños a terceros		

Result of the third qualifying round of the National OTI Festival – Mexico 1998
R/O	Song	Artist	Score	Result
	"Cachito"	Adriana Zerpa		
	"Otra vez la soledad"	Jade		
	"Señora"	Matiz		
	"Voy a volverme loco"	Fernando Ibarra		Qualified

=== Final ===
The eight-song final was held on Thursday 20 August 1998. The winner was "Voy a volverme loco", written by Gerardo Flores, and performed by Fernando Ibarra; with "Sin decir palabra", written by Fernando Riba and Kiko Campos and performed by Sergio Arzate, placing third. The top three entries received a medal and a diploma. The first prize was endowed with a monetary amount of Mex$150,000, the second prize of Mex$70,000, and the third prize of Mex$30,000. The winner also received a contract to produce the theme song for a Televisa telenovela. Luigi Lazareno receivied the Best Musical Arrangement for "Nada más por hoy" voted by the orchestra musicians.

Winner

Result of the final of the National OTI Festival – Mexico 1998
R/O	Song	Artist	Result
	"Cuentos Compartidos"	Alejandro Filio	
	"Sin decir palabra"	Sergio Arzate	3
	"Voy a volverme loco"	Fernando Ibarra	1

== At the OTI Festival ==
On 13–14 November 1998, the OTI Festival was held at the Teatro Nacional in San José, hosted by Representaciones Televisivas (Repretel), and broadcast live throughout Ibero-America. Fernando Ibarra performed "Voy a volverme loco" in the semi-final, with Alejandro Hernández conducting the event's orchestra, and qualifying for the final. At the end, only the top three places were announced, and the Mexican entry was not one of them, remaining with the title of finalist.
