= Allan Luiz Ignacio de Lima =

Portuguese songwriter and composer

Allan Luiz Ignacio de Lima is a Portuguese songwriter and composer for the band Imaginassba. As a solo songwriter, and together with singer Suel, he has had songs recorded by artists such as Beto, Mumuzinho, Sorriso Maroto, Bom Gosto, Pixote, Clareou, Swing and Simpatia and Ferrugem.

== Career ==
His first song, "Let the dream take us", was recorded by Belo. In 2011 Allan was invited by Suel to take over the musical direction of the group Imaginasamba, where he began a partnership with the singer. The duo posted their first hit, "Love Me or Forget Me", in 2001. Together they sang works including "Go with God", "In joy or sadness", "Retrô" and "No vestiges". Allan Lima and Suel also sang hits recorded by other established artists such as Mumuzinho, Sorriso Maroto, Bom gosto, Pixote, Clareou, Swing and Simpatia, Ferrugem among others. Successes such as "Speak", "Fulminante", "Prayer", "Dependent".
