= Chile in the OTI Festival 1979 =

- OTI Festival 1979
- Participating broadcasters: Televisión Nacional de Chile (TVN); Corporación de Televisión de la Universidad Católica de Chile (UCTV); Corporación de Televisión de la Universidad de Chile (UTV)
- Country: Chile
- Selection process: National final
- Selection date: 10 November 1979

Competing entry
- Song: "La música"
- Artist: Patricia Maldonado
- Songwriter: Scottie Scott

Placement
- Final result: 14th, 10 points

Participation chronology
◄1978 •	1979	• 1980►

Chile was represented at the OTI Festival 1979 with the song "La música", written by Scottie Scott, and performed by Patricia Maldonado. The Chilean participating broadcasters, Televisión Nacional de Chile (TVN), Corporación de Televisión de la Universidad Católica de Chile (UCTV), and Corporación de Televisión de la Universidad de Chile (UTV), jointly selected their entry through a televised national final. The song, that was performed in position 9, placed fourteenth out of 21 competing entries, tying with the song from the Dominican Republic with 10 points.

== National stage ==
Televisión Nacional de Chile (TVN), Corporación de Televisión de la Universidad Católica de Chile (UCTV), and Corporación de Televisión de la Universidad de Chile (UTV), held a national final jointly to select their entry for the 8th edition of the OTI Festival. Eight songs were shortlisted for the televised final by a committee composed of: Juan Salazar, Valentín Trujillo, Pedro Flores, and Miguel Moreno Monroy.

Competing entries on the national final – Chile 1979
Song	Artist	Songwriter(s)
"De aire suave y delicado"	Enrique Saa	Enrique Saa
"De naranjas e infancia"	Patricia Meza and Grupo Mesaluba	Nano Acevedo
"La música"	Patricia Maldonado	Scottie Scott
"Oratorio menor"	Luz Eliana	Nano Acevedo
"Pero no pintes tristezas"	María Inés Naveillán	Luis "Poncho" Venegas
"Sentimiento latino"	Alexander Murray	Alexander Murray
"Sol de primavera"	Sebastián Lee	Carlos Gómez
"Vuelo de amor"	Osvaldo Díaz	Osvaldo Jeldres

=== National final ===
The national final was held on Saturday 10 November 1979, beginning at 21:30 CLST (00:30+1 UTC), and was presented by Rodolfo Torrealba. Each of the competing performances was filmed beforehand in a different outdoor location, with audio recorded in a studio with an orchestra conducted by Juan Salazar. It was staged by UCTV at its central studios in Santiago, (Note: The jury was located in studio A, while the performers and songwriters were located in studio B.), and broadcast on TVN's Canal 7, UCTV's Canal 13, and UTV's Canal 11.

The members of the jury were: María Olga Fernández, Homero Zamorano, Cecilia Serrano, José Goles, and Juan Azúa.

The winner was "La música", written by Scottie Scott, and performed by Patricia Maldonado. The song, that tied with 23 points with "De naranjas e infancia" and "Pero no pintes tristezas", won after the tie-breaking vote. (Note: To break the tie for first place, the jury voted between the three songs with 23 points, with "La música" receiving 3 votes and "De naranjas e infancia" receiving 2.)

Winner

Result of the national final – Chile 1979
R/O	Song	Artist	Points	Result
1	"Sol de primavera"	Sebastián Lee	14	7
2	"Sentimiento latino"	Alexander Murray	15	6
3	"De naranjas e infancia"	Patricia Meza and Grupo Mesaluba	23	2
4	"La música"	Patricia Maldonado	23	1
5	"Oratorio menor"	Luz Eliana	22	4
6	"Vuelo de amor"	Osvaldo Díaz	18	5
7	"Pero no pintes tristezas"	María Inés Naveillán	23	3
8	"De aire suave y delicado"	Enrique Saa	11	8

Detailed vote of the national final – Chile 1979
R/O	Song	M. Olga Fernández	Homero Zamorano	Cecilia Serrano	José Goles	Juan Azúa	Total
1	"Sol de primavera"	3	2	3	3	3	14
2	"Sentimiento latino"	3	3	3	3	3	15
3	"De naranjas e infancia"	5	3	5	5	5	23
4	"La música"	5	5	4	4	5	23
5	"Oratorio menor"	4	3	5	5	5	22
6	"Vuelo de amor"	4	4	3	3	4	18
7	"Pero no pintes tristezas"	5	5	4	5	4	23
8	"De aire suave y delicado"	2	2	2	2	3	11

== At the OTI Festival ==
On 8 December 1979, the OTI Festival was held at the Theatre of the Military Academy in Caracas, Venezuela, hosted by Radio Caracas Televisión (RCTV), Venevisión, Televisora Nacional (TVN), and Venezolana de Televisión (VTV), and broadcast live throughout Ibero-America. Patricia Maldonado performed "La música" in position 9, with Juan Salazar conducting the event's orchestra, and placing fourteenth out of 21 competing entries, tying with the song from the Dominican Republic with 10 points.

The festival was broadcast live on TVN's Canal 7, UCTV's Canal 13, and UTV's Canal 9.

=== Voting ===
Each participating broadcaster, or group of broadcasters that jointly participated representing a country, assembled a jury who awarded 5–1 points to their five favourite songs in order of preference.

Points awarded to Chile
Score	Country
5 points	
4 points	Puerto Rico
3 points	Argentina; Brazil
2 points	
1 point	

Points awarded by Chile
Score	Country
5 points	Guatemala
4 points	Honduras
3 points	Panama
2 points	Paraguay
1 point	Colombia
