= OTI Festival 2000 =

28th OTI Song Festival

Dates and venue
- Semi-final: 19 May 2000
- Final: 20 May 2000
- Venue: Salón Teotihuacán; Centro de Convenciones; Acapulco, Mexico

Organization
- Organizer: Organización de Televisión Iberoamericana (OTI)

Production
- Host broadcaster: Televisa
- Director: Antonio Acevedo
- Musical director: Nando Hernández
- Presenters: Semi-final: Otto Sirgo; Susana González; Final: Emmanuel; Andrea Legarreta; Bárbara Ferré; Gabriela Spanic; Nora Salinas

Participants
- Number of entries: 20
- Number of finalists: 10
- Non-returning countries: Colombia; Netherlands Antilles; Uruguay
- Participation map: Finalist countries Countries eliminated in the semi-final Countries that participated in the past but not in 2000

Vote
- Voting system: The members of a single jury selected their favourite songs in a secret vote
- Winning song: United States "Hierba mala"

The OTI Festival 2000 (Spanish: Vigésimo Octavo Gran Premio de la Canción Iberoamericana, Portuguese: Vigésimo Oitavo Grande Prêmio da Canção Ibero-Americana) was the 28th and last edition of the OTI Festival. It consisted of a semi-final on 19 May, presented by Otto Sirgo and Susana González, and a final on 20 May 2000, presented by Emmanuel, Andrea Legarreta, Bárbara Ferré, Gabriela Spanic, and Nora Salinas, held at the Salón Teotihuacán of the Centro de Convenciones in Acapulco, Mexico. It was organised by the Organización de Televisión Iberoamericana (OTI) and host broadcaster Televisa. Initially scheduled for 19–20 November 1999 in Veracruz, it had to be postponed and relocated due to the severe flooding that occurred in early October in the country, which devastated the city.

Broadcasters from twenty countries participated in the festival. The winner was the song "Hierba mala", written by Angie Chirino, Olga María Chirino, and Emilio Estefan, and performed by Hermanas Chirino representing the United States; with "Con una canción", written and performed by José Vega representing Puerto Rico, placing second; and "Mi vida", written by Gerardo Flores, and performed by Natalia Sosa representing Mexico, placing third.

== Location ==
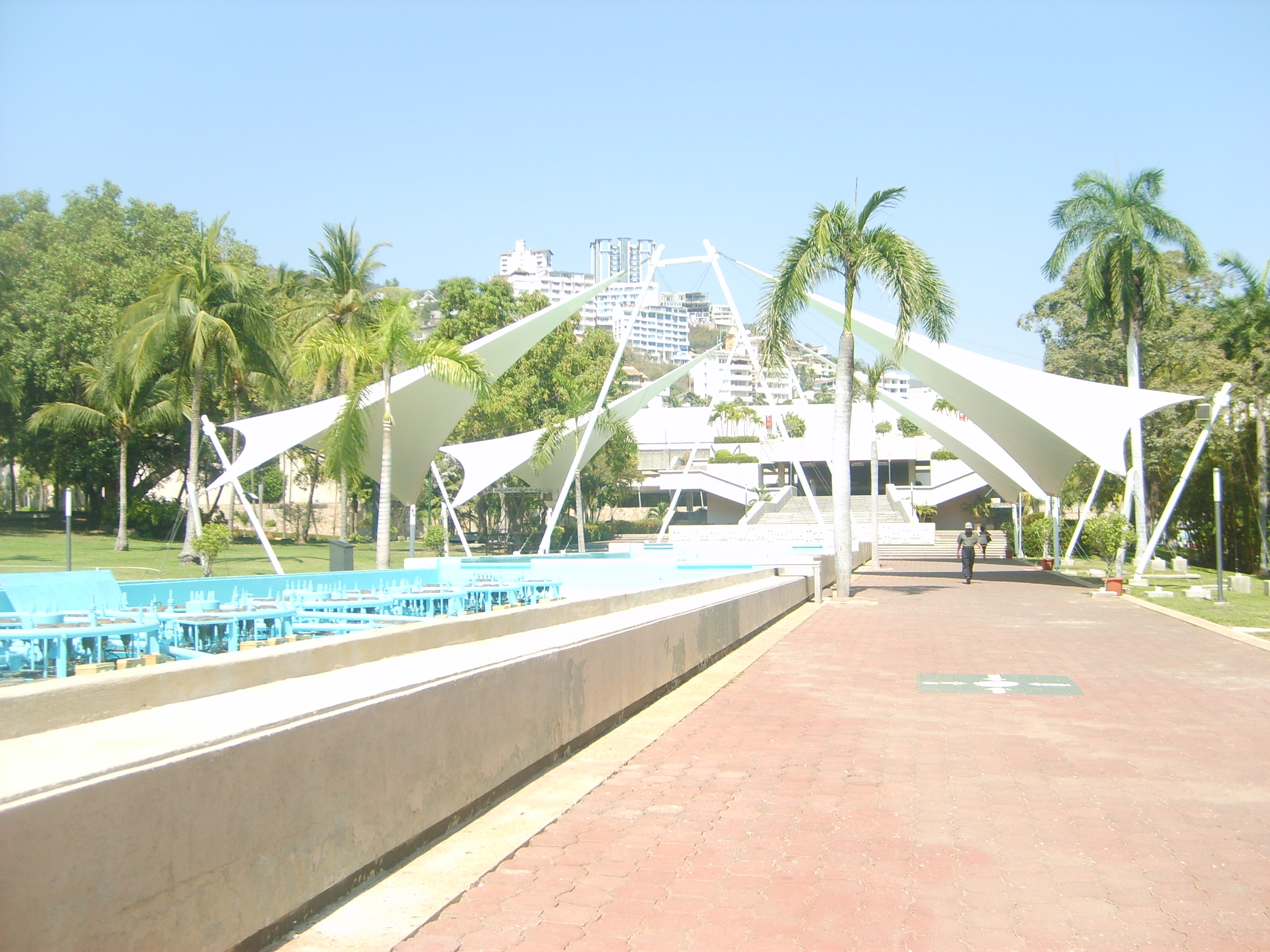
Centro de Convenciones, Acapulco – host venue of the OTI Festival 2000.

The Organización de Televisión Iberoamericana (OTI) designated Televisa as the host broadcaster for the 28th edition of the OTI Festival. The event was initially scheduled for 19–20 November 1999 in Veracruz, but it had to be suspended due to the severe flooding that occurred in early October in the country, which devastated the city. Televisa, in agreement with the OTI, decided to postpone the event to May 2000, relocating it to Acapulco. The venue selected was the Salón Teotihuacán of the Centro de Convenciones, which is a multipurpose hall with an area of 5,475 m^{2} (58,930 sq ft) within the convention and exhibition center. The hall had hosted the festival in 1991.

== Participants ==
Broadcasters from twenty countries participated in this edition of the OTI Festival. The OTI members, public or private broadcasters from Spain, Portugal, and eighteen Spanish and Portuguese speaking countries of Ibero-America signed up for the festival. From the countries that participated in the previous edition only Colombia, the Netherlands Antilles, and Uruguay were absent.

Some of the participating broadcasters, such as those representing Chile and Costa Rica, selected their entries through their regular national televised competitions. Other broadcasters decided to select their entry internally.

Two performing artists had previously represented the same country in previous editions: Guillermo Guido had represented Argentina in 1988 and 1996 (winning in 1988), and Luis Fernando Piedra had represented Costa Rica in 1993.

Participants of the OTI Festival 2000
Country	Broadcaster(s)	Song	Artist	Songwriter(s)	Language	Conductor
Argentina		"Amar es tan simple"	Guillermo Guido	Alejandro Szwarcman	Spanish	José Ogivieki
Bolivia		"Destino"	Micaela	Carlos Kieffer; Jens Meyer	Spanish	
Chile	UCTV	"Tú, naturaleza"	Magdalena Matthey	María Magdalena Matthey	Spanish	Tilo González
Costa Rica	Repretel	"Como la marea"	Hernán Corao and Luis Fernando Piedra	Luis Fernando Piedra	Spanish	William Porras
Cuba	ICRT	"Una vida nueva"	Indira Hernández	Leonel Viera López	Spanish	Nando Hernández
Dominican Republic		"¿Qué nos pasa?"	Rando Camasta	Rando Camasta	Spanish	Nando Hernández
Ecuador		"Canto por ti, por amor"	Danilo Fernando Rosero Murillo	Gustavo Maruri Cedeño; Roy Gabriel Maruri Salazar	Spanish	
El Salvador	TCS	"Soñador"	Marinella Arrué	Roberto Godoy	Spanish	
Guatemala		"Luna serena"	Lico Vadelli	Fernando Scheel	Spanish	
Honduras		"Te entregué mi corazón"	Diana Lara	Serafina de Milla	Spanish	
Mexico	Televisa	"Mi vida"	Natalia Sosa	Gerardo Flores	Spanish	
Nicaragua		"Libera el corazón"	Lya Barrioz	Chrystiam Somarriba; Roberto Damha; Hugo Castilla	Spanish	
Panama		"Un mañana mejor"	Jorge Bordanea	Jorge Bordanea; Carlos Iván Zúñiga; Juan Carlos Bordanea	Spanish	
Paraguay		"Empiezo a vivir"	Lenys	Lenys	Spanish	
Peru		"Un planeta, un corazón"	Anna Carina	Gonzalo Polar; Jorge Sabogal	Spanish	
Portugal	RTP	"Mar Portugal"	Lena d'Água	José Jorge Letria; José Marinho	Portuguese	
Puerto Rico	Telemundo Puerto Rico	"Con una canción"	José Vega	José Vega	Spanish	Pedro Rivera Toledo
Spain	TVE	"Volver al sur"	Sylvia Pantoja	Eladio Ballester; Alberto Tarín	Spanish	Nando Hernández
United States	Univision	"Hierba mala"	Hermanas Chirino	Angie Chirino; Olga María Chirino; Emilio Estefan	Spanish	
Venezuela		"Yo cantante"	Mary Olga Rodríguez	Alicia Lozada	Spanish	

== Festival overview ==
The festival consisted of a semi-final on Friday 19 May and a final on Saturday 20 May 2000. The semi-final was presented by Otto Sirgo and Susana González. The final was presented on stage by Emmanuel, Andrea Legarreta, Gabriela Spanic, and Nora Salinas; with Bárbara Ferré presenting from the rear of the auditorium, with a full view of the hall behind her; and Eduardo Videgaray as the voice-over. Some of the beauty ambassadors present at the event also made some secondary presentations, such as Kisha Alvarado Murillo of Costa Rica, Ingrid Yrivarren of Peru, Carolina Balzán of the United States, and Martina Thorogood of Venezuela. The musical director was Nando Hernández, who conducted the orchestra when required.

=== Semi-final ===
The semi-final was held on Friday 19 May 2000. The twenty participating entries were performed in the semi-final, of which only ten advanced to the final, with Mexico having a guaranteed place in the final as the host country. The draw to determine the running order (R/O) in the final was held during the semi-final, after the announcement of the qualifying songs.

Qualifier

Results of the semi-final of the OTI Festival 2000
R/O	Country	Song	Artist	Result
1	Bolivia	"Destino"	Micaela	—N/a
2	Panama	"Un mañana mejor"	Jorge Bordanea	—N/a
3	Puerto Rico	"Con una canción"	José Vega	Qualified
4	Portugal	"Mar Portugal"	Lena d'Água	Qualified
5	Honduras	"Te entregué mi corazón"	Diana Lara	—N/a
6	Dominican Republic	"¿Qué nos pasa?"	Rando Camasta	Qualified
7	Costa Rica	"Como la marea"	Hernán Corao and Luis Fernando Piedra	Qualified
8	Spain	"Volver al sur"	Sylvia Pantoja	Qualified
9	Argentina	"Amar es tan simple"	Guillermo Guido	Qualified
10	United States	"Hierba mala"	Hermanas Chirino	Qualified
11	Peru	"Un planeta, un corazón"	Anna Carina	Qualified
12	Ecuador	"Canto por ti, por amor"	Danilo Fernando Rosero Murillo	—N/a
13	Guatemala	"Luna serena"	Lico Vadelli	—N/a
14	El Salvador	"Soñador"	Marinella Arrué	—N/a
15	Venezuela	"Yo cantante"	Mary Olga Rodríguez	—N/a
16	Chile	"Tú, naturaleza"	Magdalena Matthey	—N/a
17	Paraguay	"Empiezo a vivir"	Lenys	—N/a
18	Nicaragua	"Libera el corazón"	Lya Barrioz	—N/a
19	Cuba	"Una vida nueva"	Indira Hernández	Qualified
20	Mexico	"Mi vida"	Natalia Sosa	Qualified

=== Final ===
The final was held on Saturday 20 May 2000. It opened with a medley of some of the songs that have won the festival throughout its history performed by the members of the backing choir: "Una canción no es suficiente" (representing Mexico in 1989), "A dónde voy sin ti" (Spain 1992), "Canción dispareja" (Argentina 1994), "La felicidad" (Mexico 1975), "Se diga lo que se diga" (Mexico 1997), and "Fin de siglo, éste es el tiempo de inflamarse, deprimirse o transformarse" (Chile 1998), with the latter leaded by its original singer Florcita Motuda. The show also featured another winning song performed by its original performer: "El fandango aquí" by Eugenia León (Mexico 1985); and other performances by Charlie Zaa, Marco Antonio Solís, Hernaldo Zúñiga, Francisco Céspedes, and Emmanuel.

The winner was the song "Hierba mala", written by Angie Chirino, Olga María Chirino, and Emilio Estefan, and performed by Hermanas Chirino representing the United States; with "Con una canción", written and performed by José Vega representing Puerto Rico, placing second; and "Mi vida", written by Gerardo Flores, and performed by Natalia Sosa representing Mexico, placing third. There was a trophy for each of the first three places. The first prize trophy was delivered by Emilio Azcárraga, president of OTI, and the beauty ambassador of Costa Rica, Kisha Alvarado; the second prize trophy by Eladio Lárez, vice-president of OTI, and the beauty ambassador of Venezuela, Martina Thorogood; and the third prize trophy by Nicolás Castillo, president of the OTI programs committee, and the beauty ambassador of the United States, Carolina Balzán. The festival ended with a reprise of the winning entry.

Winner

Results of the final of the OTI Festival 2000
R/O	Country	Song	Artist	Place
1	Cuba	"Una vida nueva"	Indira Hernández	—N/a
2	United States	"Hierba mala"	Hermanas Chirino	1
3	Argentina	"Amar es tan simple"	Guillermo Guido	—N/a
4	Portugal	"Mar Portugal"	Lena d'Água	—N/a
5	Costa Rica	"Como la marea"	Hernán Corao and Luis Fernando Piedra	—N/a
6	Puerto Rico	"Con una canción"	José Vega	2
7	Spain	"Volver al sur"	Sylvia Pantoja	—N/a
8	Dominican Republic	"¿Qué nos pasa?"	Rando Camasta	—N/a
9	Peru	"Un planeta, un corazón"	Anna Carina	—N/a
10	Mexico	"Mi vida"	Natalia Sosa	3

=== Jury ===
The nine members of a single jury selected their favourite songs in a secret vote. The voting system was not disclosed, and in the final only the top three places were revealed, with third place awarded to two songs jointly. The members of the jury were:

- Emanuel Ortega – singer-songwriter
- Felipe Gil – songwriter, wrote the entries for Mexico in 1975 and 1981, winning in 1975
- Alejandro Abad – singer-songwriter, wrote the winning entries for Spain in 1993 and 1995
- Charlie Zaa – singer
- Florcita Motuda – musician, represented Chile in 1978, 1981, and 1998, winning in 1998
- Eduardo Magallanes – composer, wrote the entry for Mexico in 1979
- Kike Santander – composer
- Hernaldo Zúñiga – singer-songwriter, represented Nicaragua in 1974
- Noelia – singer-songwriter

== Broadcast ==
The festival was broadcast in the 20 participating countries where the corresponding OTI member broadcasters relayed the contest through their networks after receiving it live via satellite.

Known details on the broadcasts in each country, including the specific broadcasting stations and commentators are shown in the tables below.

Broadcasters and commentators in participating countries
Country	Broadcaster	Channel(s)	Show(s)	Commentator(s)	Ref.
Chile	UCTV	Canal 13	Final	Claudia Conserva and Marcelo Comparini	
Costa Rica	Repretel	Canal 4	Semi-final (Note: Delayed broadcast at 22:00 CST (04:00+1 UTC))		
Costa Rica	Repretel	Canal 6	Final		
Mexico	Televisa		All shows		
Spain	TVE	La Primera	All shows	José Luis Uribarri	
