= José Vega Santana =

Puerto Rican clown (born 1958)

José Vega Santana "Remi"
- Born: February 28, 1958 (age 68); San Juan, Puerto Rico
- Occupations: Singer, host, clown, comedian
- Website: payasoremi.com

José Vega Santana, known by his stage name "Remi" (born February 28, 1958) is a singer and clown from Puerto Rico. His career as a clown, spanning over 35 years, began with the group "Los Dulces Payasos" ("The Sweet Clowns") after developing the character of Remi while a student at the Interamerican University of Puerto Rico. He's one of the most famed clowns in Puerto Rico.

== Family life ==
Vega is married to Bettina Mercado, president of Bettina Cosmetics. He has a daughter from a previous marriage to Marina Berti, Marina Vega Berti who participated in Miss Universe Puerto Rico 2013 as Miss Luquillo.

== Early years ==
Vega was born in San Juan, Puerto Rico, his mother was the lead singer in "Googie Santana" and his grandfather was former baseball player Pepe Santana. Ever since he was young, Vega knew that he wanted to be an entertainer. He started as a radio music programmer and announcer. Later, he joined the dance and theater company of María Teresa Miranda.

In the mid-1970s, Vega was a Psychology student in the Interamerican University of Puerto Rico. During that time he also took painting classes in the School of Plastic Arts in San Juan. It is there that he, together with some other students decided to form an "Artisans Market" at the Luis Muñoz Rivera Park. The purpose of the "Market" was to give painting classes to young children, and on one occasion they dressed up as clowns. This was when Vega developed and created aspects that were later incorporated into the character of "Remi". They became so popular that they decided to form a group and call themselves Los Dulces Payasos (The Sweet Clowns). Vega performed under the stage name Ajonjolí in the musical clown-themed group. They made frequent appearances in the programming of WRIK-TV.

== Remi the clown ==
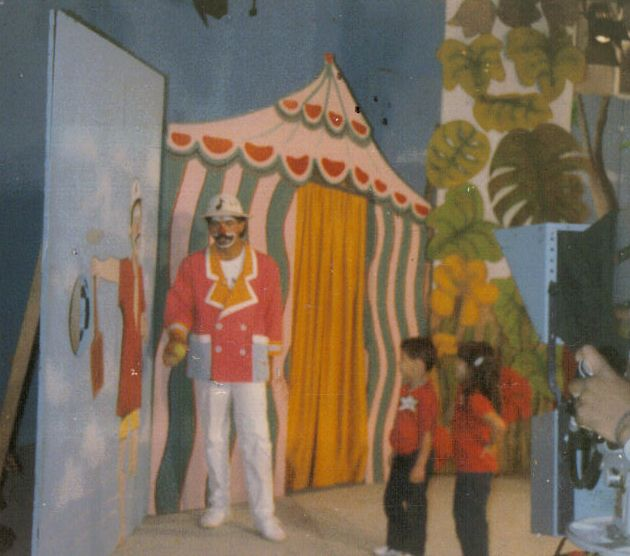
Remi's "Chiquimundo" Show

In 1983, Vega and the group received an offer from local T.V. producer Tommy Muñiz to work in "Channel 7". The channel gave them their own children's show. During this time they also recorded an album with songs composed by Vega. They have the distinction of being the first "cultural clowns" to create new children's songs in Puerto Rico.

During the time that Vega wasn't acting in his clown character, he sang and composed songs for the group Haciendo Punto en Otro Son. Vega composed "Mi Son", a song that summarized the band's journey from the first album until the last studio album Llegaremos. He participated in the group until the live album, Punto Final (1986). He also did a solo of one of his compositions called "Personajes".

In 1985, Vega developed a new concept in children's television, which he called Chiquimundo, and whose main objective was to educate children. The show was given the approval, and he served as its main scriptwriter. It was there that the character of Remi first appeared in television, named after the musical cues do-re-mi which were shortened following the suggestion of Muñiz. A variety show aimed at a younger audience and hosting a number of special guests, the segment was able to compete with a number of established children's shows such as Titi Chagua y Tío Novel and Pacheco. This show was also transmitted on "Channel 7" and was produced by Rafo Muñiz (Tommy's son). "Remi" was joined by the clowns "Colorina" and "Cascabel". The show was an instant hit with the children and their parents in Puerto Rico. With a loose concept Los siete del Siete would take over the prime time slot Thursdays, and be hosted by a number of local talents including Agrelot, Morales, Olivo, Avellanet, Jovet, Logroño and Vega himself.

In 1986, the three clowns recorded an album for children which became a local hit. Vega joined forces with the musician Pedro Rivera Toledo and produced the theater production of El Soldadito de Plomo (The Little Lead Soldier) in which Vega played the leading role.

== Singing career ==
He represented Puerto Rico in the OTI Festival 2000 with the song "Con una canción", placing second. Vega received a hero's welcome upon his return to the island and was honored by the Puerto Rico House of Representatives and Senate for his distinguished career of 20 years.

== Later years ==
Vega has traveled to many cities in the United States making presentations as "Remi". He had a comic book which was called Remi, El Clown which presented the adventures of Puerto Rico's Clown, Remi.

== See also ==
- List of Puerto Ricans
- List of Puerto Rican songwriters
