= OTI Festival 1979 =

8th OTI Song Festival

Date and venue
- Final: 8 December 1979
- Venue: Theatre of the Military Academy; Caracas, Venezuela

Organization
- Organizer: Organización de Televisión Iberoamericana (OTI)
- Supervisor: Condorcet Da Silva Costa
- Host broadcaster: Radio Caracas Televisión; Venevisión; Televisora Nacional; Venezolana de Televisión
- Musical director: Eduardo Cabrera
- Presenters: Eduardo Serrano; Carmen Victoria Pérez

Participants
- Number of entries: 21
- Returning countries: Portugal; Guatemala
- Participation map: Participating countries Countries that participated in the past but not in 1979

Vote
- Voting system: Each country awarded 5-1 points to their 5 favourite songs
- Winning song: Argentina "Cuenta conmigo"

The OTI Festival 1979 (Spanish: Octavo Gran Premio de la Canción Iberoamericana, Portuguese: Oitavo Grande Prêmio da Canção Ibero-Americana) was the eighth edition of the OTI Festival, held on 8 December 1979 at the Theatre of the Military Academy in Caracas, Venezuela, and presented by Eduardo Serrano and Carmen Victoria Pérez. It was organised by the Organización de Televisión Iberoamericana (OTI) and host broadcasters Radio Caracas Televisión (RCTV), Venevisión, Televisora Nacional (TVN), and Venezolana de Televisión (VTV), which staged the event after Venezuela got the hosting duties in a draw.

Broadcasters from twenty-one countries participated in the festival. The winner was the song "Cuenta conmigo", written by Chico Novarro and Raúl Parentella, and performed by Daniel Riolobos representing Argentina; with "Cuando era niño", written by José "Pollo" Sifontes, and performed by Delia Dorta representing Venezuela, placing second; and "Na cabana junto à praia", written and performed by José Cid representing Portugal, placing third.

== Location ==
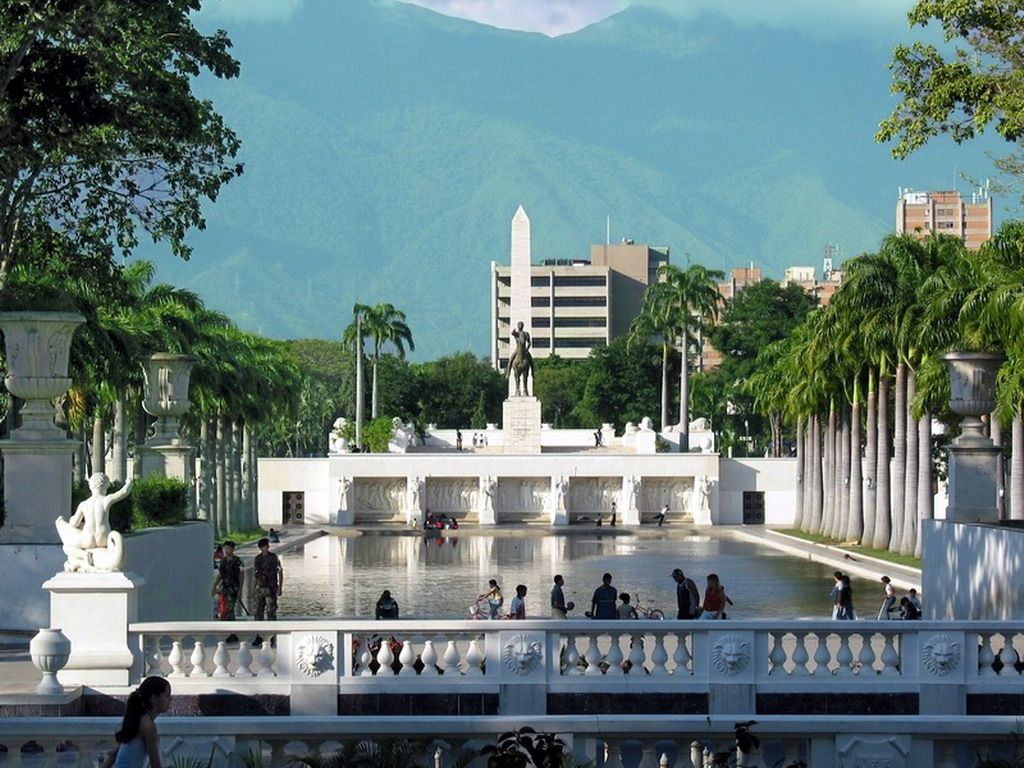
Caracas was the host city of the OTI Festival 1979.

The Organización de Televisión Iberoamericana (OTI) decided to organize a draw among the countries of its member broadcasters to select the location for the eighth edition of the OTI Festival, in which Venezuela was the one picked.

Four Venezuelan national television networks joined forces in order to host the festival: Radio Caracas Televisión (RCTV), Venevisión, Televisora Nacional (TVN), and Venezolana de Televisión (VTV). These broadcasters, who collectively presented themselves as La industria de la televisión venezolana, staged the event in Caracas. The selected venue was the Theatre of the Military Academy of Venezuela, which is a venue located at the Caracas Military Circle in the Libertador Municipality within the Metropolitan District of Caracas. The theatre, that was built in 1953, had seats for more than 1,000 people, becoming the biggest theatre of the Venezuelan capital. This was the only time the festival was held in the country.

The participating delegations were accommodated at Hotel Tamanaco.

== Participants ==
Broadcasters from twenty-one countries participated in this edition of the OTI Festival. The OTI members, public or private broadcasters from Spain, Portugal, and nineteen Spanish and Portuguese speaking countries of Ibero-America signed up for the festival. All countries that participated in the previous edition returned, and were joined by Guatemala and Portugal, that had missed that festival. This number matched the record number of participants achieved in 1977.

Some of the participating broadcasters, such as those representing Argentina, Chile, Mexico, the Netherlands Antilles, the United States, and Venezuela selected their entries through their regular national televised competitions. Other broadcasters decided to select their entry internally.

Participants of the OTI Festival 1979
Country	Broadcaster(s)	Song	Artist	Songwriter(s)	Language	Conductor
Argentina	Canal Once	"Cuenta conmigo"	Daniel Riolobos	Chico Novarro; Raúl Parentella	Spanish	Raúl Parentella
Brazil		"Conselhos"	Miltinho	Hamilton Pereira; Decio Richardi	Portuguese	Eduardo Cabrera
Chile	TVN; UCTV; UTV	"La música"	Patricia Maldonado	Scottie Scott	Spanish	Juan Salazar
Colombia	Caracol Televisión; PUNCH; RTI	"A cualquier hora"	Paola	Evelina Porto de Mejía	Spanish	Mario Cuesta
Costa Rica	Telecentro; Teletica	"Vivamos hoy"	Claudia	Flory Navarrete Ortiz; Paco Navarrete	Spanish	Benjamín Gutiérrez
Dominican Republic		"Mi mundo"	Omar Franco	Adriano Rodríguez	Spanish	Danny León
Ecuador	AECTV	"Cómo tener tu cariño"	Miguel Ángel Vergara	Francisco Moreno Bustamante	Spanish	Claudio Fabre
El Salvador	Canal Cuatro	"Niño, mi lindo niño"	Andrés Valencia	Jorge Abullajare Hasfura	Spanish	Jill Carson
Guatemala		"La mitad de mi naranja"	Luis Galich Porta and Pirámide	Luis Galich Porta	Spanish	Vinicio Quezada
Honduras		"Hermano hispanoamericano"	Gloria Janeth	Tony Sierra	Spanish	Eduardo Cabrera
Mexico	Televisa	"Vivir sin ti"	Estela Núñez	Roberto Robles; Eduardo Magallanes	Spanish	Eduardo Magallanes
Netherlands Antilles	ATM	"Mi niño"	Don Ramon	Don Ramon Krozendijk; Burt Welch	Spanish	Roberto Montiel
Panama		"Sueños"	Tony Espino	Pedro Azael	Spanish	Eduardo Cabrera
Paraguay		"La vida en mi canción"	Derlis Esteche	Derlis Esteche	Spanish	Oscar Cardozo Ocampo
Peru		"Benito gazeta"	José Escajadillo	José Escajadillo	Spanish	Víctor Cuadros
Portugal	RTP	"Na cabana junto à praia"	José Cid	José Cid	Portuguese	Jorge Costa Pinto
Puerto Rico	Canal 2 Telemundo	"Cadenas de fuego"	Ednita Nazario	Ednita Nazario; L. B. Wilde	Spanish	Ettore Stratta
Spain	TVE	"Viviré"	Rosa María Lobo	José Luis Moreno; Pablo Herrero; José Luis Armenteros	Spanish	Eduardo Leiva
United States	SIN	"Y una esperanza más"	Mario Alberto Milar	Mario Alberto Milar	Spanish	
Uruguay	Sociedad Televisora Larrañaga	"Vamos a dar amor"	Dolores	Mario López Azagra	Spanish	Julio Frade
Venezuela		"Cuando era niño"	Delia Dorta	José "Pollo" Sifontes	Spanish	Anibal Abreu

== Festival overview ==
The festival was held on Saturday 8 December 1979, beginning at 19:00 VET (23:00 UTC). It was presented by Eduardo Serrano and Carmen Victoria Pérez. The musical director was Eduardo Cabrera, who conducted the orchestra and the mixed choir of six voices when required. The show featured a guest performance by José Luis Rodríguez singing "Iberoamérica hoy canta para ti", the official song of the event written by Pablo Schneider. The draw to determine the running order (R/O) was held in Caracas a few days before the festival.

The winner was the song "Cuenta conmigo", written by Chico Novarro and Raúl Parentella, and performed by Daniel Riolobos representing Argentina; with "Cuando era niño", written by José "Pollo" Sifontes, and performed by Delia Dorta representing Venezuela, placing second; and "Na cabana junto à praia", written and performed by José Cid representing Portugal, placing third. There was a trophy for each of the first three places. The first prize trophy was delivered by Guillermo Cañedo, president of OTI; the second prize trophy by Eduardo Reina, vice-president of OTI; and the third prize trophy by Félix Cardona Moreno, president of the television industry chamber. The festival ended with a reprise of the winning entry.

Winner

Results of the OTI Festival 1979
R/O	Country	Song	Artist	Points	Place
1	Netherlands Antilles	"Mi niño"	Don Ramon	16	9
2	Honduras	"Hermano hispanoamericano"	Gloria Janeth	19	7
3	Puerto Rico	"Cadenas de fuego"	Ednita Nazario	21	5
4	Dominican Republic	"Mi mundo"	Omar Franco	10	14
5	Guatemala	"La mitad de mi naranja"	Luis Galich Porta and Pirámide	13	12
6	Colombia	"A cualquier hora"	Paola	2	18
7	Ecuador	"Cómo tener tu cariño"	Miguel Ángel Vergara	0	20
8	El Salvador	"Niño, mi lindo niño"	Andrés Valencia	0	20
9	Chile	"La música"	Patricia Maldonado	10	14
10	Argentina	"Cuenta conmigo"	Daniel Riolobos	43	1
11	Brazil	"Conselhos"	Miltinho	21	5
12	Venezuela	"Cuando era niño"	Delia Dorta	33	2
13	Mexico	"Vivir sin ti"	Estela Núñez	18	8
14	Panama	"Sueños"	Tony Espino	12	13
15	Uruguay	"Vamos a dar amor"	Dolores	4	16
16	Portugal	"Na cabana junto à praia"	José Cid	32	3
17	Peru	"Benito gazeta"	José Escajadillo	14	11
18	Costa Rica	"Vivamos hoy"	Claudia	2	18
19	Paraguay	"La vida en mi canción"	Derlis Esteche	4	16
20	United States	"Y una esperanza más"	Mario Alberto Milar	16	9
21	Spain	"Viviré"	Rosa María Lobo	25	4

=== Spokespersons ===
Each participating broadcaster (Note: Or group of broadcasters that jointly participated representing a country.) appointed a spokesperson who was responsible for announcing the points for their respective jury in descending order. Known spokespersons at the 1979 festival are listed below.

- Colombia – Roberto Reyes Toledo
- El Salvador – Altagracia Arévalo
- Chile – Raúl Matas
- Peru – Luis Ángel Pinasco
- Costa Rica – Rodrigo Sánchez
- Panama – Justo Fidel Palacios

== Detailed voting results ==
Each participating broadcaster assembled a national jury located in its respective country, composed of four members each, and a president who only decided in case of a tie. Each jury awarded 5 points its favourite song, 4 points to the second favourite, and then between 3 and 1 points for the third- to fifth-favourite songs, except for the entry representing its own country. To ensure that there was no vote switching, before the voting segment began each participating broadcaster announced to its national audience the vote of its jury in local opt-out from its studios. Each participating broadcaster had also a delegate present in the hall to stand in for its jury if it was not receiving the event live, or in case of communication failure during the broadcast or voting.

All the countries gave their votes remotely by telephone, except for the Netherlands Antilles, the Dominican Republic, and Paraguay, which used the stand-in delegates. The countries voted in order of participation, but due to a communication problem with the spokespersons of Argentina, Brazil, and Panama, these had to be left for the end, with Brazil ending up unable to respond and having to also use the stand-in delegate.

Detailed voting results of the OTI Festival 1979
Voter: National jury Stand-in delegate		Voting countries																					Points
Voter: National jury Stand-in delegate		Netherlands Antilles	Honduras	Puerto Rico	Dominican Republic	Guatemala	Colombia	Ecuador	El Salvador	Chile	Argentina	Brazil	Venezuela	Mexico	Panama	Uruguay	Portugal	Peru	Costa Rica	Paraguay	United States	Spain	Points
Contestants	Netherlands Antilles				5							4					4			3			16
Contestants	Honduras					5				4			3				3		3		1		19
Contestants	Puerto Rico				3			1			5		5	3		1	1				2		21
Contestants	Dominican Republic	2		3				2										3					10
Contestants	Guatemala	5								5							2		1				13
Contestants	Colombia									1												1	2
Contestants	Ecuador																						0
Contestants	El Salvador																						0
Contestants	Chile			4							3	3											10
Contestants	Argentina	1		5		4	2	5				2	4	4	4	5		4			3		43
Contestants	Brazil					2	3	3			2		2		1	4					4		21
Contestants	Venezuela						5	4	3			5		5	2			5		4			33
Contestants	Mexico		3			3			2		1					2		1	2			4	18
Contestants	Panama									3		1									5	3	12
Contestants	Uruguay																			2		2	4
Contestants	Portugal	4	5	1			1				4		1	1	3	3			4			5	32
Contestants	Peru				4										5		5						14
Contestants	Costa Rica				1				1														2
Contestants	Paraguay		2							2													4
Contestants	United States	3	1		2				4										5	1			16
Contestants	Spain		4	2		1	4		5					2				2		5			25

== Broadcast ==
The festival was broadcast in the 21 participating countries, where the corresponding OTI member broadcasters relayed the contest through their networks after receiving it live via satellite. This festival is remembered in Venezuela as the very first show that was broadcast live in color in the country.

Known details on the broadcasts of the festival in each country, including the specific broadcasting stations, commentators, and presenters of the local opt-out are shown in the tables below.

Broadcasters, commentators, and local presenters in participating countries
Country	Broadcaster	Channel(s)	Commentator(s)	Local presenter(s)	Ref.
Argentina	Canal Once			Antonio Carrizo	
Chile	TVN	Canal 7			
Chile	UTV	Canal 9			
Chile	UCTV	Canal 13			
Chile	UCVTV	Canal 5 (Note: Partial broadcast connecting at 21:30 CLST (00:30+1 UTC))			
Costa Rica	Telecentro	Telecentro Canal 6			
Costa Rica	Teletica	Canal 7			
Mexico	Televisa	Canal 2			
Portugal	RTP	RTP1 (Note: Delayed broadcast on 10 December at 21:20 WET (21:20 UTC))			
Spain	TVE	TVE 1	Miguel de los Santos		
Venezuela	RCTV	Canal 2			
Venezuela	Venevisión	Canal 4			
Venezuela	TVN	Canal 5			
Venezuela	VTV	Canal 8			

== Reception ==
The potential viewers figures, as those of the previous year, reached the level of 300 million. The quality of the sound system and the stage were also highly valued by the media.

Daniel Riolobos, the winner, advanced his career thanks to the victory he got for Argentina, the first one that the South American country would get in the OTI Festival.

Ednita Nazario, who was selected internally by Telemundo to represent Puerto Rico in Caracas, is nowadays a recognised personality in her home country, in Latin America and in the Spanish language communities of the United States of America. In the following edition of the OTI Festival, which was held in Buenos Aires, she was awarded for the composition of the winning song.

Delia Dorta, the second place winner, would become an important singer in the Venezuelan music scene after her second place in the contest. From then on, her voice would be heard in many TV commercials. She would also appear for many times in the programme Súper Sábado Sensacional, the most popular show aired by Venevisión.

Other performers, such as the Peruvian José Escajadillo who specialised in Creollan music, would enjoy a successful career after getting the eleventh place in this edition of the festival with the song "Benito gazeta".
