= Omar Franco =

Dominican singer

- Born: Castañuelas, Monte Cristi, Dominican Republic
- Genres: Latin pop, bolero
- Occupations: Singer, songwriter
- Instrument: Vocal
- Years active: 1971–present
- Labels: Borinquen, RCA, Alhambra, Sonidiscos, Taurus Sound, Akropolis Records

Omar Franco, Dominican singer and composer, was born on June 11 in the town of Castañuelas, in the province of Monte Cristi, Dominican Republic. He spent most of his childhood, reaching adulthood, in the city of La Vega.

== Beginnings ==
Franco began his singing career when he won first place in the Primer Festival de la Voz Vegana (First Festival of Vegan Voice) in La Vega, in 1971. He joined the orchestra of Rafelito Martinez, as a singer of boleros. He studied the first year at the Faculty of Medicine of the Universidad Autónoma de Santo Domingo, but stopped his studies to engage in an artistic career.

In November 1972, he participated in the fifth Festival de la Canción Dominicana, celebrated by AMUCABA (Association of musicians, singers, dancers and speakers) at the Palacio de Bellas Artes of Santo Domingo with "Por Ti'", a song he composed, and won three awards: third place as the composer of "Por Ti", third place as the performer of it and "The Revelation of the Festival". That song was recorded by Franco at LP Festival finalists and later by the Puerto Rican singer Carmita Jiménez. After the festival, the city of La Vega gave him a certificate of recognition declaring him an "Adopted Son" of the city. Thereafter, he began appearing on various programs on Dominican television.

In 1973 and 1975, he participated in the second and third Festival International de la Canción y de la Voz of Puerto Rico, respectively, being among the finalists.

He took singing lessons with teacher and lyric soprano Olga Azar, at the "Conservatorio Nacional de Música". This allowed him to play the character of Gastone in the opera La Traviata by Giuseppe Verdi, when that work, conducted by Maestro Carlos Piantini, was presented at the Teatro Nacional Dominicano in 1977.

== Career ==
In 1979, he recorded his first LP under RCA Victor in Mexico. That same year he represented the Dominican Republic in the eighth edition of the OTI Festival with "Mi mundo", getting 14th place with 10 points.

In February 1982, he won the award as Best Performer with the song composed by Leonor Porcella de Brea "Ven y abrázame", which took ninth place in the Octavo Festival de la Canción Dominicana (Eight Dominican Song Festival) of AMUCABA, held at the Teatro Nacional (National Theater).

In May 1982, Franco and Taty Salas, another Dominican singer, participated in the musical show called "El Show de Las Flores", with the famous Spanish singuers: Lola Flores, Lolita Flores, Carmen Flores and Carmen Sevilla.

In August 1982, he performed with the singer Luchy Vicioso in the show called Noche Dominicana, at the Altos de Chavón amphitheater, La Romana, Dominican Republic.

In December 1982, he was one of the lead vocalists in the Spanish version of the musical Jesus Christ Superstar, at the Teatro Nacional, playing the role of Jesus Christ in it. The play was revived in March 1983.

In February 1983, he won the El Dorado prize, as male singer, in his country, Dominican Republic, for his merits accumulated in 1982.

In April 1983, he sang in the television show Siempre en Domingo, of the famous Mexican producer Raul Velasco, when this program was broadcast from the amphitheater at Altos de Chavón in Dominican Republic.

In May 1983, he appeared, among other artists, in the show in honor to the television program Santo Domingo Invita at the Felt Forum in Madison Square Garden, New York.

In November 1983, he participated again in the TV show Siempre en Domingo, this time in Televisa, Mexico.

In 1986, the "Premios Casandra" (Casandra Awards) rewarded the record production "Dos Estrellas Omar y Taty a Medianoche", which was recorded as a duet with Taty Salas in 1985, with the prize "Carátula del Año" (Cover of the Year).

On 22 February 2011, Acroarte makes it a recognition of his career in the Dominican romantic music in the Gala of Nominations of the Casandra Awards 2011.

As an actor, he played two stellar roles in the play-musical "Amor a Primera Vista" (Love at First Sight), work written and produced by Edgar Contreras, directed by Bienvenido Miranda and which was staged at the Teatro Nacional in April 1986, with the participation of some 30 actors and an orchestra of 10 musicians, conducted by Manuel Tejada.

He was also part of the musical show Imagen y Sonido de Broadway (Image and Sound of Broadway), at the Teatro Nacional, in July 1998, with over 100 performers, including singers, dancers and an orchestra of over than 60 musicians under the production and management Amaury Sánchez, Carlos Veitía’s choreography, the artistic direction of Eduardo Villanueva and Luis José Mella as special guest orchestral director.

== Collaborations ==
Besides their commercial records, he has collaborated in diverse anthological recordings of the Dominican Republic music, such as: "Homenaje a la Canción Romántica Dominicana-40 Aniversario", Banco de Reservas de la República Dominicana (1981), which includes the songs "Tú me haces falta" by Armando Cabrera and "Amorosa" by Salvador Sturla; "La Música de sus Versos, Joaquín Balaguer" (September 1986) with the song "El pasado", whose lyrics are by Joaquín Balaguer and music by Ricardo Bello; "José Francisco Eterno" (a tribute to José Francisco Peña Gómez, which took place in 1999), with the song "La Gloria no tiene final".

== Awards and recognitions ==
- El Dorado (1982)
- El Gordo del Año (1983)
- Premiación de Santiago – La Cotorra (1985)
- El Disco del Año (1985)
- Premios Casandra -Carátula del Año (1986)
- Premios Casandra -Recognition of his artistic career (February 22, 2011)

== Discography ==
=== Albums ===
- Mis años con ella (1979) (RCA – Mexico)
- Ven y abrázame (1982) (Bartolo I-RD / Alhambra – U.S.)
- Dos Estrellas Omar y Taty a Medianoche (1985) (Sonidiscos – RD / Taurus Sound – U.S.)
- El mejor amor (1987) (INEN – RD / Taurus Sound – U.S.)
- Omar Franco Otra Vez (2009) (Akropolis Records – RD)

=== Singles ===
- "Por ti" (1972) (AMUCABA)
- "Le di mi amor a cualquiera" (1975) (Borinquen)
- "Perdona la franqueza" (1975) (Borinquen)
- "Imagínate" (1976) (Borinquen)
- "Lléname los días" (1978) (Bartolo I – RD / RCA – Mexico)
- "Mis años con ella" (1979) (Bartolo I – RD / RCA – Mexico)
- "Sed" (1981) (Akropolis Records – RD)
- "Ven y abrázame" (1982) (Bartolo I – RD)
- "Qué más pides de mí" (1983) (Bartolo I – RD)
- "Gloria o infierno" (1983) (Bartolo I – RD / Alhambra – U.S.)
- "Mejor vete con el otro" (1983) (Bartolo I – RD)

=== Compilations ===
- Omar Franco Exitos vol. 1 (1998) (Akropolis Records – RD)
- Lo mejor de Omar Franco (2001) (Akropolis Records – RD)
- Omar Franco 18 Canciones (2015) (Akropolis Records – U.S.)
- Omar Franco & Taty Salas a Medianoche – Duetos (2015) (Acrópolis Records – U.S.)
