= Miltinho =

Brazilian singer

Miltinho or Miltiño
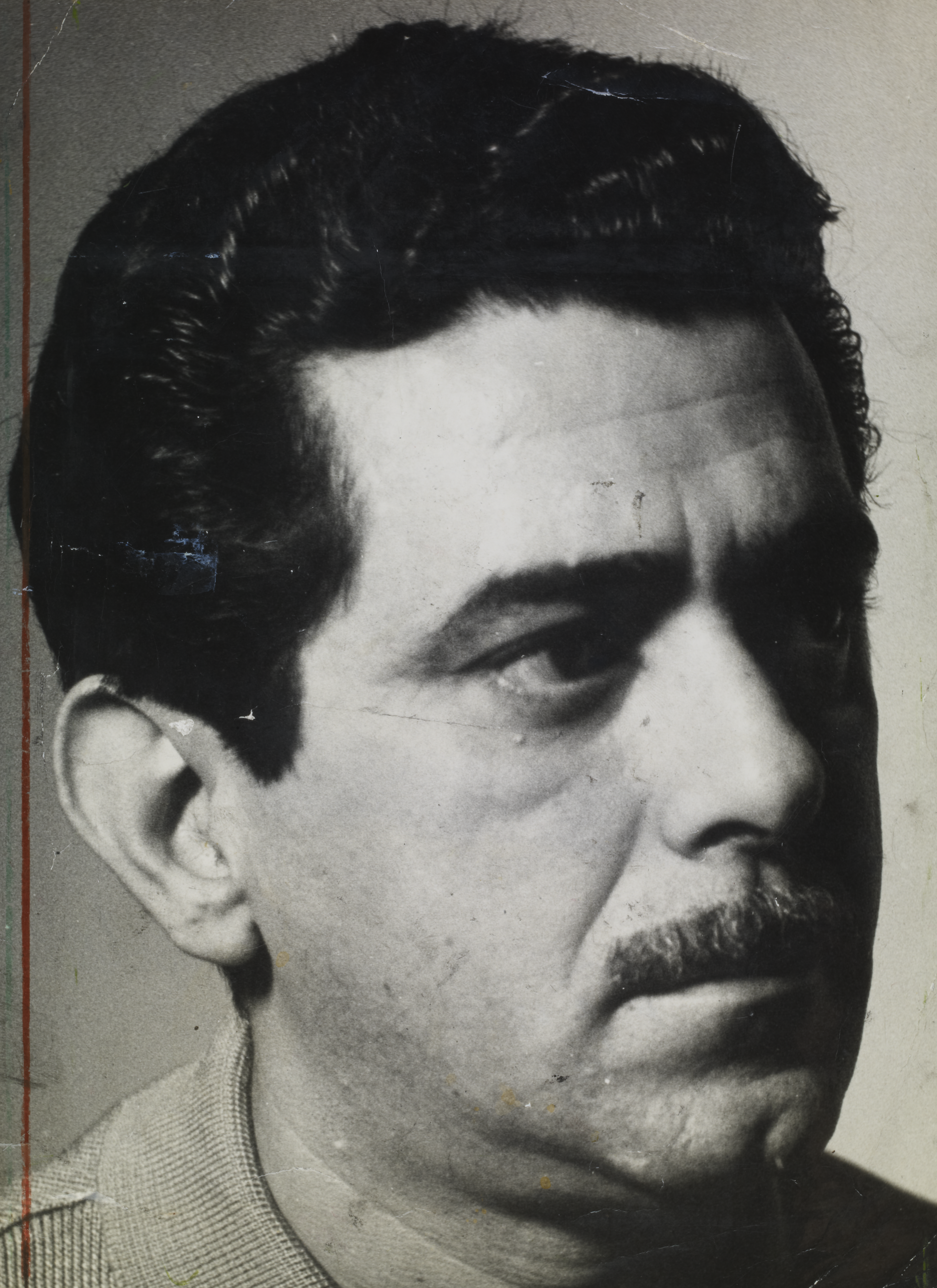
- A portrait of Milton Santos de Almeida

Background information
- Born: Milton Santos de Almeida; January 31, 1928; Rio de Janeiro, Brazil
- Died: September 7, 2014 (aged 86) Rio de Janeiro
- Genres: Samba, sambalanço, samba-canção, música popular brasileira
- Occupation: Singer
- Years active: 1940–2014
- Labels: Sidera, RCA Victor, RGE, Odeon, Movieplay, Globo Columbia

Milton Santos de Almeida (January 31, 1928 – September 7, 2014), known professionally as Miltinho (Miltiño in Spanish), was a Brazilian singer of samba, sambalanço, samba-canção and bossa nova music.

== Early years ==
Milton Santos de Almeida was born in Niteroi, Brazil a city with a lot of beaches belonging to the state of Rio de Janeiro located off the capital of Rio de Janeiro. He began his musical career in the forties integrating, along with other cariocas students, Cancioneiros do Luar group, who participated in the Tupi Radio program hosted by Ary Barroso.

== Career ==
He began his career in the 1940s as a member of several vocal groups: Anjos do Inferno (who came to travel to the United States following Carmen Miranda) Namorados da Lua, Quatro Ases e Um Curinga, Milionários do Ritmo, Cancioneiros do Luar. In 1960 he released his first solo album, "Um Novo Astro", starting a highly successful career in the early marked by his nasal voice, accustomed to samba-teleco teco and romantic songs. Was devoted to the success Mulher de 30. With this song he won a lot of money and public recognition. He received several awards, took part in the major television programs of the time.

In 1979 he represented Brazil in the eight edition of the OTI Festival which was held in Caracas, Venezuela. His competing song entitled "Conselho" (Advice) was critically well received in the festival. At the end of the show, he got a more than respectable fifth place tied with his Puerto Rican counterpart Ednita Nazario with 21 points.

In total, Miltinho recorded over a hundred albums, more in the 70s, with the decline of his musical genre, bowed out in the big cities, focusing their presentations in the inner cities. "Mulata assanhada", “Palhaçada”, “O Conde”, “Laranja Madura”, “Volta”, “Menino moça” "Meu Nome É Ninguém" e "Confidência" are his other successes, which earned him the nickname "King of Rhythm". Miltinho began from a very young age to sing sambas and play the tambourine. His career took off when the manager of RCA Victor, composer Jair Amorim, proposed to record in Spanish. Miltinho made ten LPs of Brazilian music and began to impose their songs in Spanish.

== Death ==
Miltinho suffered a cardiac arrest at the Hospital of Amparo in the north of Rio de Janeiro. Miltinho was hospitalized for two months for respiratory problems at the medical center. The funeral of the singer was held in the Memorial Chapel 3 do Carmo in the port area of Rio de Janeiro. Miltinho's daughter, Sandra Vergara told the international media that her father Miltinho had been retired for four years after being diagnosed with Alzheimers. The body of Miltinho was cremated in the Camaro Memorial in Rio de Janeiro. Miltinho always said that he had learned to make peace "with god". The funeral of Miltinho, who left three children and five grandchildren, was held in the Memorial Chapel 3 do Carmo, in the port area of Rio de Janeiro. Having had no teachers, he had been fixated on the tambourine (pandeiro) since boyhood and admired Silvo Caldas and Frank Sinatra. Miltinho left a wealth of songs, riding the great legacy of samba in Brazil.

== Personal life ==
Militinho has three kids named Milton Almeida and Sandra Vergara and has five grandchildren the third child name is unknown

== Discography ==
- Billo-Miltiño- Doctores en Ritmo (1959) with Billo Frómeta
- Um Novo Astro (1960)
- Diploma do Astro (1960)
- Miltinho (1961)
- Poema do Olhar (1962)
- Poema do Adeus (1962)
- Tá Bien (1963) with Pocho Perez Y Su Orquestra
- Os Grandes Sucessos de Miltinho (1963)
- Miltinho É Samba (1963)
- Eu...Miltinho (1963)
- Mi Propio Yo (1963) feat. Pocho Perez
- Bossa & Blanço (1964)
- Canção do Nosso Amor (1964)
- Incomparable (1964) feat. Pocho Perez
- Dulce Veneno (1964)
- Reprise De Sucessos (1964)
- El Diablo y Yo (1965)
- Poema do Fim (1965)
- Ao Vivo (1965)
- Su Estilo Y Su Canciones (1966)
- Samba + Samba= Miltinho (1966)
- Amor de Pobre Rocío (1967)
- Tu Imagen (1967)
- Amor de Pobre (1967)
- Elza, Miltinho e Samba (1967)
- Quanto Mais Samba Melhor (1967)
- Canta En Castellano (1968)
- As Mulheres de Miltinho (1968)
- Elza, Miltinho e Samba Vol.2 (1968)
- Os Grandes Successes do Miltinho Vol.2 (1968)
- El Rey Del Fraseo (1969)
- Hablemos de Amor Otra Vez (1969)
- Samba & Cia (1969)
- El Rey Del Fraseo Vol.2 (1970)
- Palabras (1970)
- Dóris, Miltinho e Charme (1970)
- El Rey Del Fraseo Vol.3 (1971)
- Novo Recado (1971)
- Dóris, Miltinho e Charme Vol.2 (1971)
- Dóris, Miltinho e Charme Vol.3 (1972)
- Dóris, Miltinho e Charme Vol.3 (1973)
- Miltinho (1973)
- Miltinho (1974)
- Mulher de Trinta, Ri, Menina Moça, Eu E O Rio, E Outrus Sucessos de Miltinho (1974)
- Corazón Vagabundo (1975)
- Miltinho (1976)
- Grandes Éxitos (1977)
- Mis Primeros Éxitos (1981)
- Ansias (1982)
- Helena De Lima E Miltinho- Gala Super Apresenta do Melha de Helena de Lima E Miltinho (1982)
- Inverno e Verão (1986)
- Miltinho Sempre (1987)
- Miltinho Convida (1998)
- Seleção de Ouro (1998)
- No Palco Ao Vivo (2000)
- Retratos (2004)
- Miltinho, Samba e Balanço (2008)
- Como Un Perro (2009)
- Cancion Del Alma (2009)
- Estoy Pensando En Ti (2009)
- Bossa Nova Hits From Brazil- Agustinho, Simonetti, Maysa, Miltinho (2011)
- Em Tempo De Bolero (2012)
- Boleros (2013)
- Essential Hits (2014)
- Essential Hits of Miltinho (2014)
- Hits (2014)
- O Melhor de Miltinho (2016)
