= José Escajadillo Farro =

Peruvian composer

José Escajadillo (born 1 December 1942) is a Peruvian composer, especially in the Creole music genre. He also composed more than 620 valses, songs, military marches, sports anthems and marineras. On October 3, 2003, he received the medal "Juan Pablo Vizcardo y Guzmán" medal from the Congress of the Republic of Peru in recognition of his outstanding music career. On 1 November 2014, in a ceremony held in Washington, DC, the Organization of American States awarded him with the title "Compositor de América" for his contributions. His best songs were included in the album José Escajadillo: Un Gigante de la Canción Peruana.

== Career ==
He studied at Glorioso Colegio Nacional de San José and in his young days was a footballer playing for Los Caimanes, based in Puerto Etén, Chiclayo, being part of the Chiclayo Provincial Football League.

His career as a composer began in the 1970s, through his original songs like "El Artista", "Jamás impedirás", "Jamás impedirás", "El viejo y el mar", "Huellas", "Que somos amantes”, "Las horas que perdí", "Yo perdí el corazón", "Un vals a la distancia", "Soledad de ti, Soledad de Mí", "Solo siempre solo", Para toda mujer hay un mañana", "Yo Soy" and "Tal Vez" etc. He also alongside Peruvian artists notably Juan Mosto and Pedro Pacheco, an initiator of a new era of Creole music, melodic in style, which to this day remains popular.

In 1979 he represented his country in the eight edition of the OTI Festival, which was held in Caracas, Venezuela. His competing song "Benito Gazeta" got the eleventh place scoring 14 points.

His compositions have been interpreted by a great number of Creole music singers including Cecilia Barraza, Eva Ayllón, Lucía de la Cruz, La Limeñita y Ascoy, Armando Manzanero, Cecilia Bracamonte, Óscar Avilés, Lucila Campos, Verónikha, María Obregón, Jesús Vásquez, Aurora Alcalá, Lorenzo Humberto Sotomayor, Manuel Donayre, Lucha Reyes as well as some composition by interpreters of other genres like Gianmarco and William Luna.

Additionally, he composed a large number of military marches including "Los Gigantes del Cenepa", "Gallos del Espacio", "Dragones del Aire", "Húsares de Junín", "Herederos de Quiñones" and "Aguilas y Halcones". In the 1980s, he wrote and sang "Manos morenas", a popular viral song dedicated to the Peruvian women volleyball team. He also composed hymns dedicated to historical figures like Francisco Bolognesi and Miguel Grau Seminario.

== Personal life ==
He was the son of Pedro Escajadillo Medianero and Yolanda Farro Poggi and had 6 brothers: Dante, Pedro, Bernardo, Victor, Miguel and William.

He married Nancy Garibaldi Muchotrigo, with whom he had two twin daughters, Nancy Patricia Escajadillo Garibaldi and Giulianna Valeria Escajadillo Garibaldi. He currently lives in Lima where he holds the position of President of the Peruvian Association of Authors and Composers (APDAYC).
