= Lena d'Água =

Portuguese singer (born 1956)

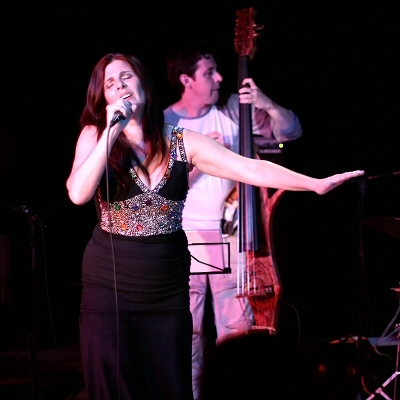
- Lena d'Água in 2006

Background information
- Born: Helena Maria de Jesus Águas; 16 June 1956 (age 69); Lisbon, Portugal
- Genres: Pop rock; jazz
- Occupations: Singer; songwriter
- Years active: 1976–present
- Labels: CBS; EMI; Universal Music; Valentim de Carvalho
- Formerly of: Beatnicks; Salada de Frutas

Helena Maria de Jesus Águas (born 16 June 1956), known professionally as Lena d'Água, is a Portuguese singer. Emerging in the late 1970s as the lead vocalist of the Beatnicks and Salada de Frutas, she became a prominent pop artist in Portugal during the 1980s. During the 2000s and early 2010s, she explored jazz and rock collaborations. In 2019 and 2024, she partnered up with songwriter Pedro da Silva Martins to release two albums of original music, Desalmadamente and Tropical Glaciar. In 2025, she received the Globo de Ouro for Best Performer in the Music category.

== Biography ==
Lena d'Água was born in Lisbon. In 1973 she enrolled briefly in Sociology but, as the 25 April 1974, Carnation Revolution came to fruition, she left university and joined a theatre group, later majoring in Education.

In 1975, Lena d'Água married Ramiro Martins, the bass player of The Beatnicks. The couple had a daughter and, in May of the following year, she joined the band as lead singer, divorcing and leaving the project in 1978. Being the first woman in the country to lead a pop rock band, she became a sex symbol and a pop star; after singing with the Beatnicks and Salada de Frutas she pursued a solo career with her band Atlântida, whose first three solo albums were produced by England's Robin Geoffrey Cable.

In 2000, she represented Portugal in the OTI Festival 2000 with the song "Mar Portugal". Later in 2002, she sang songs by Billie Holiday and Elis Regina with Portuguese jazz musicians, with whom she would later record a live album singing Portuguese classics from the 70's and 80's at the Hot Clube in 2005. Her album Carrossel was recorded in 2013, with a rock and roll power trio called Rock and Roll Station, with whom she reinterpreted her pop-rock hits from the 80s.

In 2019, Lena d’Água returned to releasing original material with Desalmadamente, an album featuring songs written by Pedro da Silva Martins, a songwriter and former member of Deolinda. Developed in collaboration with younger Portuguese musicians, including Benjamim and members of They’re Heading West, the album incorporated contemporary pop influences.

In November 2024, Lena d’Água released the album, Tropical Glaciar, featuring songs written by Pedro da Silva Martins. The album explores ecological and environmental themes, reflecting Lena's rural lifestyle in Bombarral and her concern for issues like the ecological impact of agriculture and deforestation. Lena described the collaboration with Pedro as transformative, stating that his compositions seamlessly blend with her iconic hits from the 1980s, creating a cohesive sound for her live performances. The track "O Que Fomos e o Que Somos" was particularly emotional for Lena, who had to pause recording several times due to its intensity.

== Personal life ==
Lena d'Água is the daughter of footballer José Águas, who played for Benfica and the Portuguese national team in the 1950s and 1960s. In 2011, d'Água wrote a book about her father, titled José Águas, o meu pai herói (lit. "José Águas, my hero father"). Her younger brother Rui also became a footballer and played for Benfica and Portugal in the 1980s and 1990s.

Lena d'Água was a heroin addict for about nine years. She became clean in 1998.

== Awards ==
In 2020, Lena d’Água won the José Afonso Prize 2020 (PJA) award for her album Desalmadamente.

In 2025, she won the Globo de Ouro for Best Performer in the Music category.

== Discography ==
- 1978 – Ascenção e Queda (Petrus Castrus)
- 1979 – Qual é Coisa, Qual é ela?
- 1979 - "O Nosso Livro/Cantiga da Babá" (single)
- 1980 – Sem Açúcar (Salada de Frutas)
- 1981 – "Robot/Armagedom" (Salada de Frutas single)
- 1980 – "Vígaro cá, vígaro lá/Labirinto" (single)
- 1982 – Perto de ti
- 1983 – "Papalagui/Jardim Zoológico" (single)
- 1984 – Lusitânia
- 1986 – Terra Prometida
- 1987 – Aguaceiro
- 1989 – Tu Aqui
- 1992 – Ou Isto ou Aquilo
- 1993 – As Canções do Século
- 1996 – Demagogia (greatest hits)
- 1996 – O Melhor de Lena d'Água – Sempre Que o Amor Me Quiser (greatest hits)
- 2007 – Sempre – Live at Hot Clube de Portugal
- 2011 – Lena d'Agua & Banda Atlântida (Bandas Míticas compilation, 14)
- 2014 – Carrossel
- 2019 – Desalmadamente
- 2024 – Tropical Glaciar

Awards and achievements
Preceded by Beto with "Quem espera, desespera"	Portugal in the OTI Festival; 2000	Succeeded by -
