= Costa Rica in the OTI Festival 2000 =

- OTI Festival 2000
- Participating broadcaster: Representaciones Televisivas (Repretel)
- Country: Costa Rica
- Selection process: National OTI Festival
- Selection date: 11 October 1999

Competing entry
- Song: "Como la marea"
- Artist: Luis Fernando Piedra and Hernán Corao
- Songwriter: Luis Fernando Piedra

Placement
- Semi-final result: Qualified
- Final result: Finalist

Participation chronology
◄1998 •	2000

Costa Rica was represented at the OTI Festival 2000 with the song "Como la marea", written by Luis Fernando Piedra, and performed by Piedra himself and Hernán Corao. The Costa Rican participating broadcaster, Representaciones Televisivas (Repretel), selected its entry through a televised national final. The song, qualified from the semi-final, was one of the finalists. Luis Fernando Piedra had represented Costa Rica in 1993.

== National stage ==
Representaciones Televisivas (Repretel) held a national final to select its entry for the 28th edition of the OTI Festival.

=== Competing entries ===
The broadcaster opened a song application period between 17 August and 17 September 1999. Of the 151 songs received, nine were shortlisted for the televised final. The six-member selection committee was undisclosed to ensure the transparency of the election.

Among the competing performers were Luis Fernando Piedra, who had represented Costa Rica in 1993; Duvalier Quirós, who had represented Costa Rica in 1998 along Ana Yancy Contreras; and Omar Briceño, who placed second in the national finals in 1984, 1985, 1987, and 1988.

Competing entries on the National OTI Festival – Costa Rica 1999
Song	Artist	Songwriter(s)
"Esta locura es por tí"	Enrique Dodero	Mario Campos Sandoval
"El Amor"	Grace Abarca	Grace Abarca
"¡Qué vivan los sentimientos!"	Elena Umaña	Juan Carlos Rojas
"Hacia el amanecer"	Raúl Villalta	Pablo Cuevas; Raúl Villalta
"La Negra"	Duvalier Quirós	Giovanni Barrantes
"Como la marea"	Luis Fernando Piedra and Hernán Corao	Luis Fernando Piedra
"Más allá de la Tierra"	Omar Briceño	Juan Carlos Rojas
"Así me siento"	Luis Ángel Castro	Luis Ángel Castro
"Bolero"	Alexis Guzmán	Jorge Villalobos Leitón

=== National final ===
Repretel held the National OTI Festival on Monday 11 October 1999, beginning at 21:00 CST (03:00+1 UTC), at El Greco hall of the San José Palacio Hotel in San José. It was presented by Verónica Bastos and Enrique Rodríguez; and was broadcast on Canal 6. Florcita Motuda, El Símbolo, Ana Bárbara, and Noelia made guest performances.

The jury was composed of Orlando Bertarini, Antonio Varela, Florcita Motuda, Héctor Carranza, and Juan Carlos Mena.

The winner was "Como la marea", written by Luis Fernando Piedra, and performed by Piedra himself and Hernán Corao; with "La Negra", written by Giovanni Barrantes, and performed by Duvalier Quirós placing second; and "Así me siento" written and performed by Luis Ángel Castro placing third.

Winner

Result of the National OTI Festival – Costa Rica 1999
R/O	Song	Artist	Result
1	"Esta locura es por tí"	Enrique Dodero	—N/a
2	"El Amor"	Grace Abarca	—N/a
3	"¡Qué vivan los sentimientos!"	Elena Umaña	—N/a
4	"Hacia el amanecer"	Raúl Villalta	—N/a
5	"La Negra"	Duvalier Quirós	2
6	"Como la marea"	Luis Fernando Piedra and Hernán Corao	1
7	"Más allá de la Tierra"	Omar Briceño	—N/a
8	"Así me siento"	Luis Ángel Castro	3
9	"Bolero"	Alexis Guzmán	—N/a

== At the OTI Festival ==
On 19–20 May 2000, the OTI Festival was held at the Salón Teotihuacán of the Centro de Convenciones in Acapulco, Mexico, hosted by Televisa, and broadcast live throughout Ibero-America. Luis Fernando Piedra and Hernán Corao performed "Como la marea" in position 7 in the semi-final, with William Porras conducting the event's orchestra, and qualifying to the final. In the final, they performed in position 5. At the end, only the top three places were announced, and the Costa Rican entry was not one of them, remaining with the title of finalist.

Repretel broadcast the semi-final on Canal 4 on delay at 22:00 CST (04:00+1 UTC), and the final live on Canal 6.
