= Puerto Rico in the OTI Festival =

- OTI Festival
- Participating broadcaster: Telemundo Puerto Rico (Note: Branded as WKAQ-Telemundo in 1968–1976 and Canal 2 Telemundo in 1976–1986.)

Participation summary
- Appearances: 28
- First appearance: 1972
- Last appearance: 2000
- Highest placement: 1st: 1974, 1980
- Host: 1975
- Participation history: 1972; 1973; 1974; 1975; 1976; 1977; 1978; 1979; 1980; 1981; 1982; 1983; 1984; 1985; 1986; 1987; 1988; 1989; 1990; 1991; 1992; 1993; 1994; 1995; 1996; 1997; 1998; 2000

The participation of Puerto Rico in the OTI Festival began at the inaugural OTI Festival in 1972. The Puerto Rican participating broadcaster was Telemundo Puerto Rico, which was member of the Organización de Televisión Iberoamericana (OTI). The broadcaster participated in all twenty-eight editions of the festival. It won the festival two times: in 1974 and 1980; and hosted the event once: in 1975.

== History ==
Telemundo Puerto Rico, branded as WKAQ-Telemundo in 1968–1976 and Canal 2 Telemundo in 1976–1986, selected all its entries for the OTI Festival internally. In fact, it always selected big names in order to compete in the event. It won the contest on two occasions, the first time with the song "Hoy canto por cantar" sung by Nydia Caro in 1974. This song, written by Caro and Ricardo Ceratto, was enormously popular and very controversial for being considered an "anti-protest" song. In 1980 it recorded its second victory in the festival with the song "Contigo mujer" sung by Rafael José, which was written by Laureano Brizuela and Ednita Nazario.

Apart from its victories, it managed to reach the top 10 in eight occasions, but from 1983 on, the results started declining, In fact, since then, it was unable to reach the top ten positions again, until the last edition of the show in 2000, when it got the second place with the song "Con una canción" by José Vega Santana.

WKAQ-Telemundo, hosted the OTI Festival 1975 after the victory of Nydia Caro the previous year. The venue of the contest were its own television studios in San Juan. The broadcaster created a colorful stage with a central platform and an orchestra section in the background.

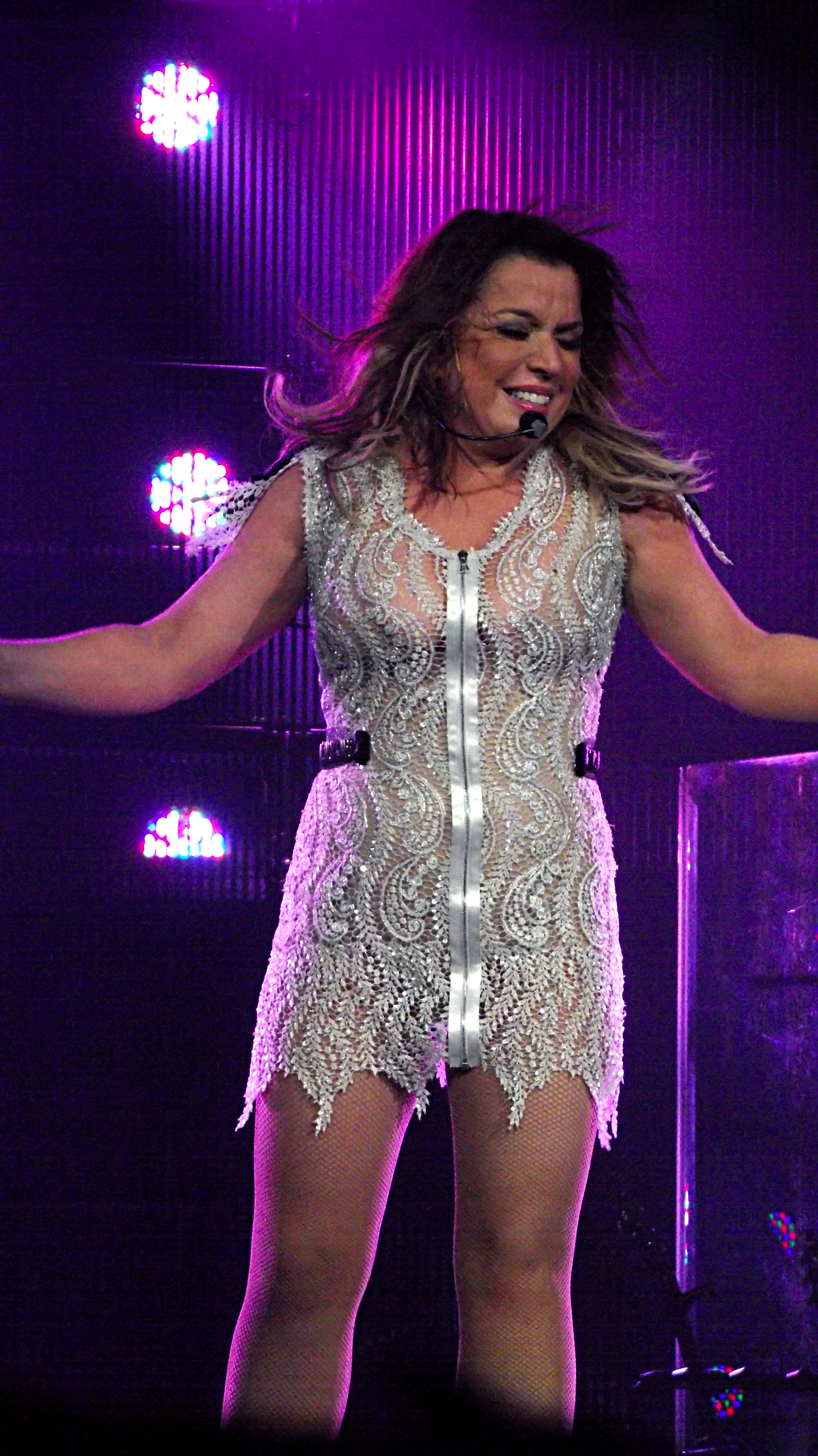
Ednita Nazario represented Puerto Rico in 1979

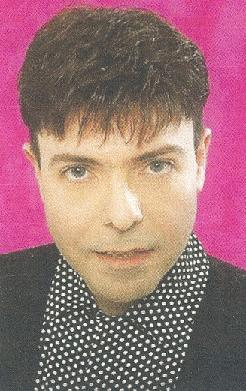
Lou Briel represented Puerto Rico in 1984

== Participation overview ==
Table key
1	First place
2	Second place
F	Finalist
SF	Semi-finalist
◇	Contest cancelled

Year	Song	Artist	Songwriter(s)	Conductor	Place	Points
1972	"Por ti"	Chucho Avellanet	Guillermo Venegas Lloveras	Pedro Rivera Toledo	4	6
1973	"Yo quiero una orquesta"	Óscar Solo	Óscar Solo	Pedro Rivera Toledo	6	5
1974	"Hoy canto por cantar"	Nydia Caro	Ricardo Ceratto; Nydia Caro	Chucho Ferrer	1	18
1975	"¿Adónde vas amigo?"	Los Hispanos	Edwin Oliver	Wilson Torres	5	5
1976	"¿Quién?"	Eduardo Delgado			15	1
1977	"Piel dorada"	Aqua Marina	Edgardo Díaz; Leyda Colón; César Antonio Reyes	Wilson Torres	6	3
1978	"Háblame"	Rafael José	Edgardo Díaz; Fernando de Diego	Pedro Rivera Toledo	4	35
1979	"Cadenas de fuego"	Ednita Nazario	Ednita Nazario; L. B. Wilde	Ettore Stratta	5	21
1980	"Contigo mujer"	Rafael José	Ednita Nazario; Laureano Brizuela	Jorge Calandrelli	1	36
1981	"Mírame a los ojos"	Glenn Monroig	Glenn Monroig	Ángel "Cucco" Peña Berdiel	15	8
1982	"Sin tu música"	Lunna	Cheo Zorrilla; Ángel "Cucco" Peña Berdiel	Ángel "Cucco" Peña Berdiel	18	5
1983	"Navegaré"	Edgardo Huertas	Lou Briel	Héctor Garrido	—N/a	
1984	"Todo llega"	Lou Briel	Lou Briel	Eddie Fernández	—N/a	
1985	"Represento"	Juan Manuel Lebrón	Lou Briel	Luis García	—N/a	
1986	"Tú y yo solos, nadie más"	Maggy	Pijuán	Pijuán	—N/a	
1987	"Soy mujer"	Marisol Calero	Marisol Calero; Alejandro Montalván	Ito Serrano	—N/a	
1988	"Para ser feliz"	Sandra Rogers	René Ferrer; Sandra Rogers	Druco Gandía	14	0
1989	"Porque no volverás"	Aldo Matta	Gustavo Márquez; Teddy Jaureen; Aldo Matta	Eddie Hernández	—N/a	
1990	"La mujer que sueño ser"	Ivonne Briel	Lou Briel	Ito Serrano	—N/a	
1991	"Nuestra voz"	José Juan Tañón	José Juan Tañón	Ito Serrano	SF	—N/a
1992	"Atrapada en el tiempo"	Brenda Reyes	Rodolfo Barrera		—N/a	
1993	"Que siga la rumba"	Rumba y Bembé	Eduardo Reyes; Miguel Soto	Eduardo Reyes	—N/a	
1994	"Lo que te toca vivir"	Jessica Cristina	José Luis Melendez	Pedro Rivera	SF	—N/a
1995	"Latinoamericano"	Carlos Alberto Fortuño	Antonio Ramía Pérez	Ramón Sánchez	—N/a	
1996	"Ay, amor"	Grupo Porto Latino	Rodolfo Barreras	Pedro Toledo	—N/a	
1997	"Almas solas"	Ángel Joel Peña	Héctor Rossi; Ángel Joel Peña	Ángel "Cucco" Peña Berdiel	SF	—N/a
1998	"Yo te propongo"	Arianna	Jonathan Dwayne; Ito Serrano	Miguel Cubano	SF	—N/a
1999	Contest cancelled ◇					
2000	"Con una canción"	José Vega Santana	José Vega	Pedro Rivera Toledo	2	—N/a

== Hosting ==
Year	City	Venue	Hosts	Ref.
1975	San Juan	Telemundo TV studios	Marisol Malaret; Eddie Miró	
