= Gran Hotel (Costa Rica) =

Hotel in San José, Costa Rica

Coordinates: 9.9336°N 84.0775°W

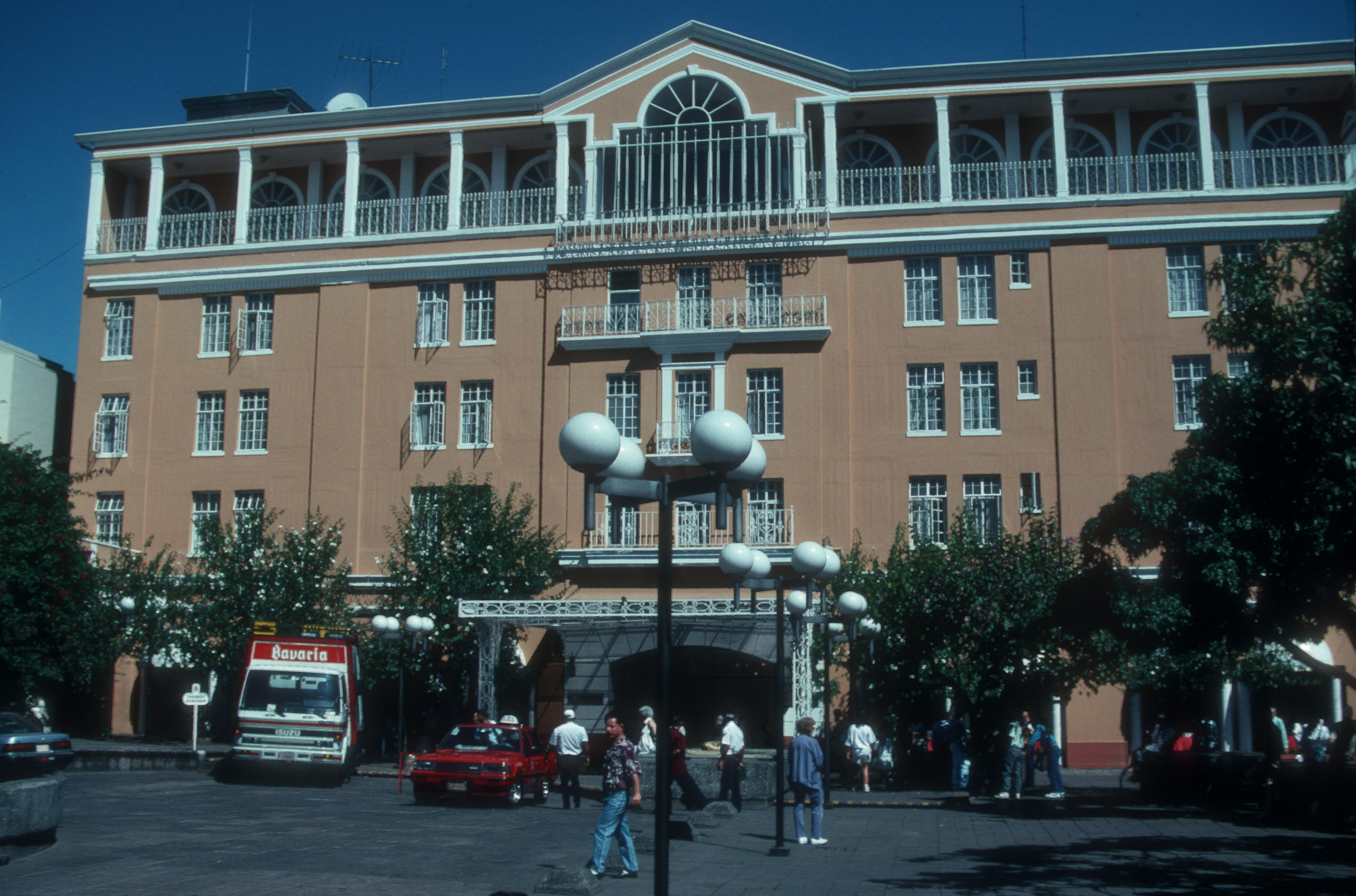
Hotel in 2009

The Gran Hotel is a hotel in San José, Costa Rica. It was built in 1930 and is a historic monument in the city. Its address is Central and Second Avenue between First and Third Streets. It's located next to the National Theater and the Plaza de la Cultura, under which lies the Pre-Columbian Gold Museum. There is a casino in the lobby and a cafe on the patio, which is noted for its marimba performances.

== History ==
The Gran Hotel Costa Rica was developed in the late 1920s by Luis Paulino Jiménez Ortiz with support from the government of Cleto González Víquez to create a modern hotel for international visitors. It was designed by American engineer Víctor Lorenz and opened on 30 October 1930. Located next to the National Theater, it became a venue for political, social, and diplomatic events. Notable guests have included John F. Kennedy, Harry S. Truman, Jimmy Carter, John Wayne, Cantinflas, and Pelé. A restoration project was carried out in 2003, and the hotel was sold to Elite Hotels & Resorts in 2013.

== Name Change ==
On October 5, 2011, Tribune Business News announced that the Gran Hotel in Costa Rica became a member of the Choice International and Reals Hotels & Resorts chain, which resulted in renaming the hotel. The name was changed to the Gran Hotel Costa Rica Ascend Collection and announced on December 14 through a press release.

On Sep 10, 2018, it became part of the Hilton Curio Collection.

== Hotel Features ==
Guest Rooms

The Gran Hotel offers five different room packages. These include standard room, superior room, deluxe room, master suite and the J.F.K. presidential suite. All rooms except standard rooms are equipped with air conditioners. There are also rooms for disabled guests. Before remodeling in 2018, there were 107 guest rooms. Now there are 79 guest rooms, suites and executive rooms.
