= Beto (Portuguese singer) =

Portuguese singer (1967–2010)

- Born: Albertino João Santos Pereira; December 28, 1967; Peniche, Portugal
- Died: May 23, 2010 (aged 42) Caldas da Rainha, Portugal
- Genre: Pop
- Occupation: Singer

Beto (December 28, 1967 – May 23, 2010), stage name of Albertino João Santos Pereira, was a Portuguese singer.

== Biography ==
Beto was born in Peniche, Portugal, and started to sing at the age of five. He settled in Torres Vedras at 17. Beto founded the music group Tanimaria in 1992, which performed in Xafarix, a bar in Lisbon. He represented Portugal in the OTI Festival 1998 with the song "Quem espera, desespera" placing third. In 2000 he recorded a project with Rita Guerra which resulted in the album Desencontros, performed by both in shows across the country. His 2003 solo debut album, Olhar em Frente, reached platinum status, followed by the plantinum-selling Influência in 2005. Those were followed by Porto de Abrigo and Por Minha Conta e Risco.

A number of his songs appeared in several Portuguese soap operas throughout the early 2000s. In 2009, Farol records edited the collection O Melhor de Beto, a best-of compilation. Among his best known and most successful themes are: "Memórias Esquecidas" and "Brincando Com O Fogo" (with Rita Guerra).

Beto was found dead in his hotel room in Caldas da Rainha on May 23, 2010, after reportedly suffering a stroke.

== See also ==
- Rita Guerra

Awards and achievements
Preceded by Ágata with "Abandonada"	Portugal in the OTI Festival; 1998	Succeeded by Lena D'Água with "Mar Portugal"
