= Patricia Maldonado (singer) =

Chilean singer and television presenter (born 1950)

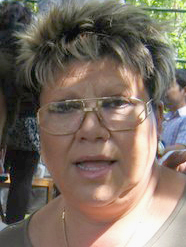
- Maldonado in 2011
- Born: Clorinda Érika Patricia Maldonado Aravena; 17 September 1950 (age 75); Santiago, Chile
- Occupations: Singer and TV host
- Spouse: Jorge Pino (m. 1986)

Clorinda Érika Patricia Maldonado Aravena (born 17 September 1950) is a Chilean singer and television presenter. In the 1970s to the late 1990s, she was active as a singer and political activist. Maldonado is widely known in the Chilean media for her strong personality and political controversy.

== Artistic career ==
Maldonado began her career as a performer of boleros and ballads during the 1970s and 1980s. In 1979, she gained stardom with the song "La quintralada", written by Florcita Motuda. That same year, she represented Chile at the OTI Festival 1979 with the song "La música", written by Scottie Scott.

In 1982 she debuted as an actor in the telenovela De cara al Mañana on TVN. At the same time, she was the host of the program Pare, mire y escuche and participated as a comedian in Jappening con Ja, replacing Maitén Montenegro. During late 1983, she settled in the United States to develop her singing career, and although she managed to release several singles on Latin music charts, she later returned to Chile.

In 1989, she presented Anímese on Channel 11. However, her public support for the military dictatorship caused most television channels to veto it during the 1990s. At the time, she had several ventures with his spouse, such as a pub called "Confetti's”and a restaurant called “El Vozarrón de la Maldo”.

In the 2000s, she turned away from music and onto television, as a panelist for pink press programs and celebrity shows, including the morning Mucho gusto and Yo soy... (on Mega), Locos por el baile, and Cantando por un sueño (Canal 13).

After the start of the 2019-20 Chilean protests, Maldonado's participation in Mucho gusto was suspended, and her program Sin límites - which she presented with Raquel Argandoña - was canceled by Radio Agricultura. In 2020, the Chilean television channel Mega did not renew their contract with Maldonado, officially ending her 17-year-long career at said channel.

== Political career ==
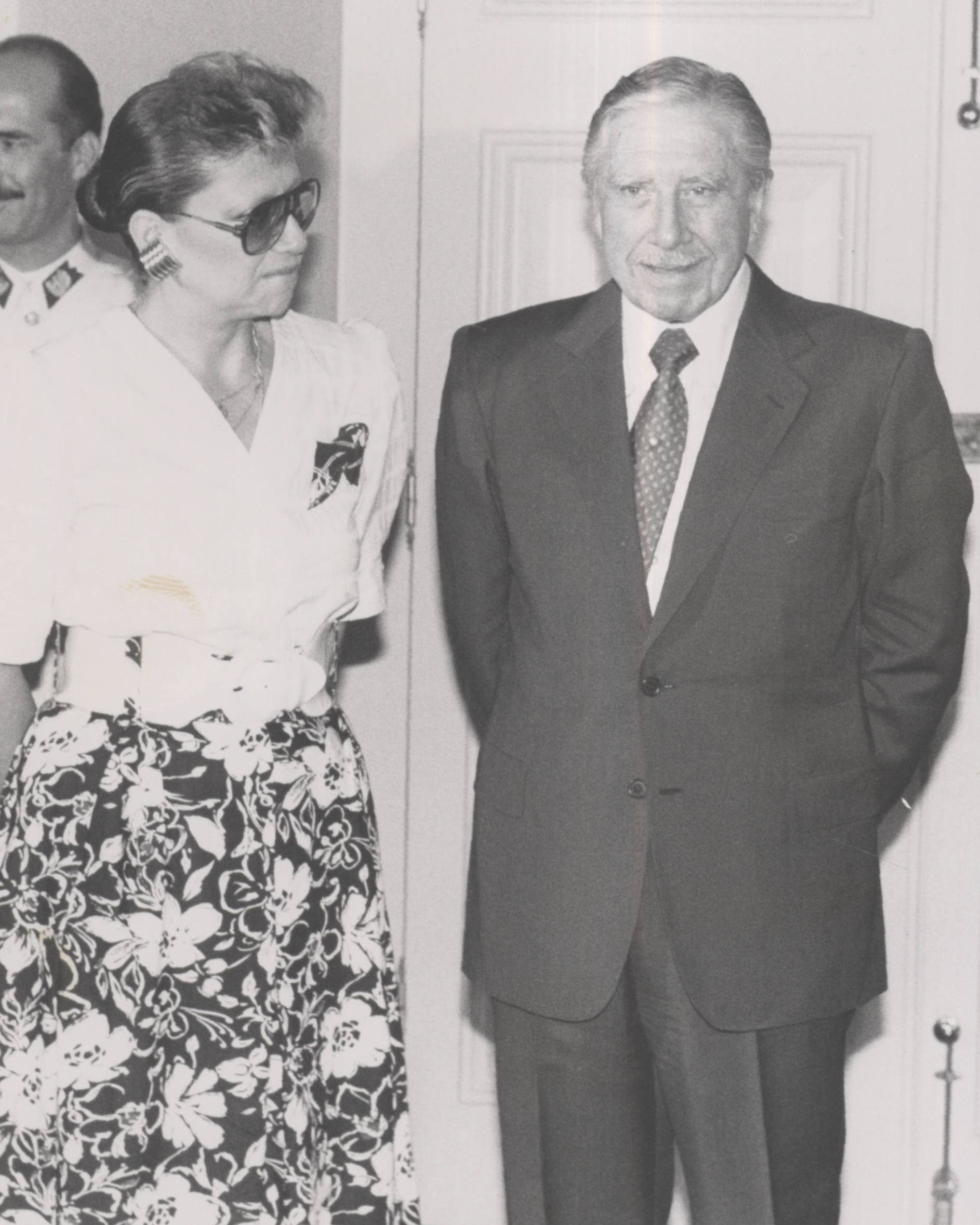
Maldonado with Augusto Pinochet

A supporter of then-president Eduardo Frei Montalva, she was a member of the Christian Democratic Party at the age of 15 and was contrary to Salvador Allende's Popular Unity government.

She was an open supporter of the military dictatorship from its beginnings. She refers to Augusto Pinochet as her "compadre", as he was the baptismal godfather of her daughter Patricia, and they shared several political ideals. She also publicly supported the pro-Pinochet "Yes" option for the 1988 plebiscite.

She was an independent candidate for deputy in the 1989 parliamentary elections, but supported by the ultra-right for the 28th electoral district of the Santiago Metropolitan Region, where she obtained 15.38% of the votes, which made her a third individual majority, but not enough to be elected. In 1990, she was one of the founders of the small right-wing party Democracia Nacional de Centro, where she became vice president.

She was again a candidate for deputy in 1997, this time as part of the ultra-right conservative Independent Democratic Union party, in order to represent the 18th electoral district of the Santiago Metropolitan Region. She obtained 11.43% of the votes. Although it constituted the second personal majority, she was not elected. After said election, she stopped participating in party politics, only making visits to London after Pinochet was arrested there in 1998.

In 2025, she joined National Libertarian Party led by Johannes Kaiser, endorsing him.

== Filmography ==
=== Television programs ===
- 1979 - OTI 1979
- 1980-1983 - Pare, mire y escuche
- 1983 - Jappening con Ja
- 1988-1990 - Cordialmente
- 1989-1990 - ¡Anímese!
- 2003 - Con ustedes
- 2003-2019 - Mucho gusto
- 2006 - Locos por el baile
- 2007 - Cantando por un sueño
- 2009 - La Noche: el reality Conductora
- 2010 - Sábado por la Noche
- 2011 - Vive USA
- 2011-2012 - Yo soy...
- 2012 - Las Argandoña
- 2013 - Vértigo

=== Telenovela ===
- 1982 - De cara al mañana

== Discography ==
Year	Title	Type
1973	Desde Hace Tiempo / Eres Lo Que Nunca Quise Ser	Single
1974	Dedicado A / Sin Adios	Single
1978	Patricia Maldonado	Album
1981	A Mi / No Quiero Ser Tu Amante	Single
1985	Patricia Maldonado	Album
1990	1973-1990 Muchas Gracias	Album
2018	Grandes Éxitos	Compilation
