= José Jorge Letria =

Portuguese poet, writer and musician

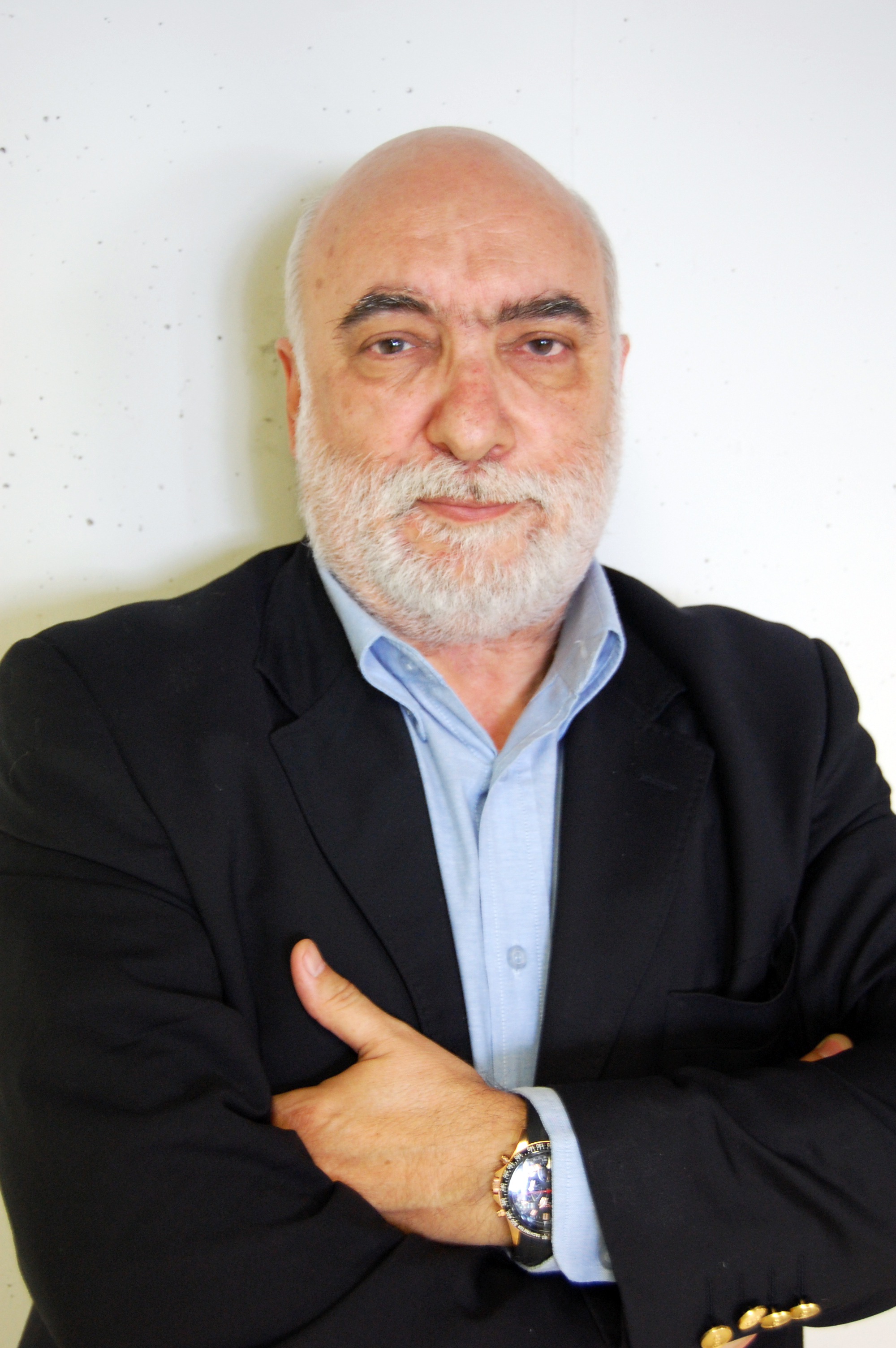
José Jorge Letria

José Jorge Letria OL (born 8 June 1951) is a Portuguese poet, writer and musician. He is the current president of Sociedade Portuguesa de Autores.

== Awards ==
He has received the UNESCO International Prize, the Eça de Queiroz Prize and received the Guerra Junqueiro Literary Prize in 2019.
