= National Theatre of Costa Rica =

Theatre in San José

Coordinates: 9°55′59.28″N 84°04′37.26″W

Teatro Nacional de Costa Rica
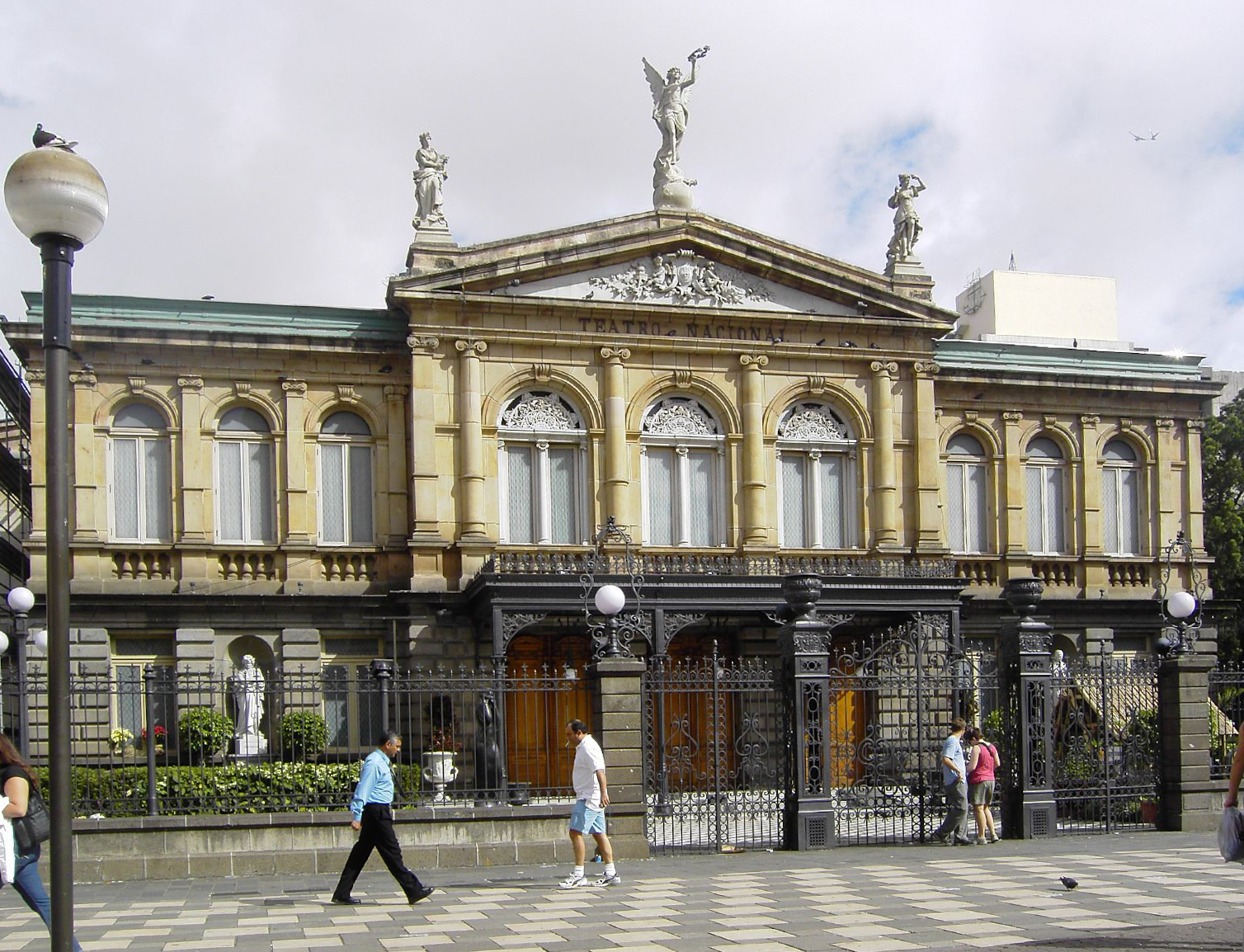
- National Theatre of Costa Rica

General information
- Type: Arts complex
- Architectural style: Neo-classical
- Location: San José, Costa Rica
- Completed: 1897
- Opened: 21 October 1897

Design and construction
- Structural engineer: Ruy Cristóforo Molinari
- Awards: Institución Benemérita de las Artes Patrias (Costa Rica, 1999); National Monument (Costa Rica, 1965)

Other information
- Seating capacity: 1,140

The National Theatre of Costa Rica (Spanish: Teatro Nacional de Costa Rica) is Costa Rica's national theatre, located in the central section of San José. Construction began in 1897, and it opened to the public on 21 October 1897 with a performance of Johann Wolfgang von Goethe's Faust. It has capacity for 1,140 people.

The National Theatre stood as a cultural asset of the country during a time when coffee exports were a source of its success. It presents high quality performances, with artistic criteria being very high.

The building is considered the finest historic building in the capital, and it is known for its exquisite interior which includes its lavish furnishings.

== History ==
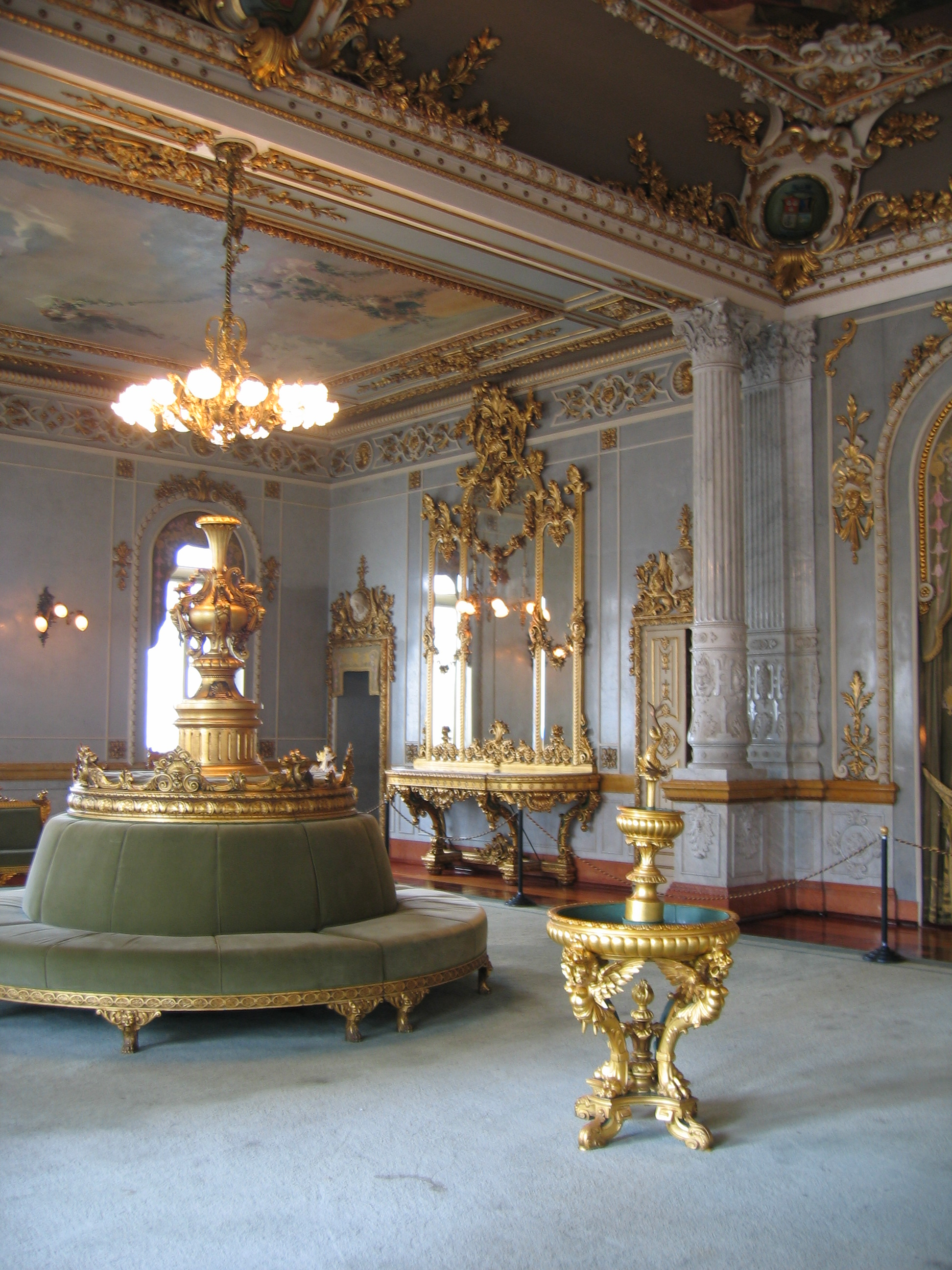
The foyer of the Teatro Nacional de Costa Rica

Constructed in the late 19th century, when San Jose's population was only around 19,000 people, the theatre presented many private performances. Its only real competition was the Teatro Mora (also called the Municipal Theatre, or Teatro Municipal), that existed for many years before the National Theatre, until it was destroyed and deemed unsafe by an earthquake.

To finance the construction of a theatre suitable for name "National Theatre", the President of Costa Rica, José Joaquín Rodríguez Zeledón decided to place a tax on coffee, then the principal export product. Later, one coffee planter begged the government to remove the export tax on his product and put it on rice and beans (also principal export products of the time).

There were many problems during the early period of construction. However, the construction errors were corrected by an Italian engineer who was brought in to direct the process. It took seven years to finish the theatre, and the inauguration took place on 21 October 1897.

The front of the theatre features statues of Calderón de la Barca and Ludwig van Beethoven. There are several monuments by the entry walkway including Frédéric Chopin. The inside features the mural Allegory of Coffee and Bananas by Milanese artist Aleardo Villa, which is featured on the five colón bill.

On 13–14 November 1998, the OTI Festival 1998 was staged at the theatre.

== The theatre today ==
As well as having performances several times a week, the theatre is a tourist attraction. Performances by the National Symphonic Orchestra (NSO) take place as part of orchestra's regular season, and include both Costa Rican and foreign composers.
