= António Avelar de Pinho =

António Avelar de Pinho (born 26 May 1947) is a Portuguese writer and songwriter from Entroncamento, He was the founding member of the groups Filarmónica Fraude (1967) and Banda do Casaco (1973).
