= Music of Nicaragua =

Marcos Iván Vílchez Ruiz known as Daz Zuvr, guitarist and vocalist of the band TheVeilers (Alternative rock and baroque pop).

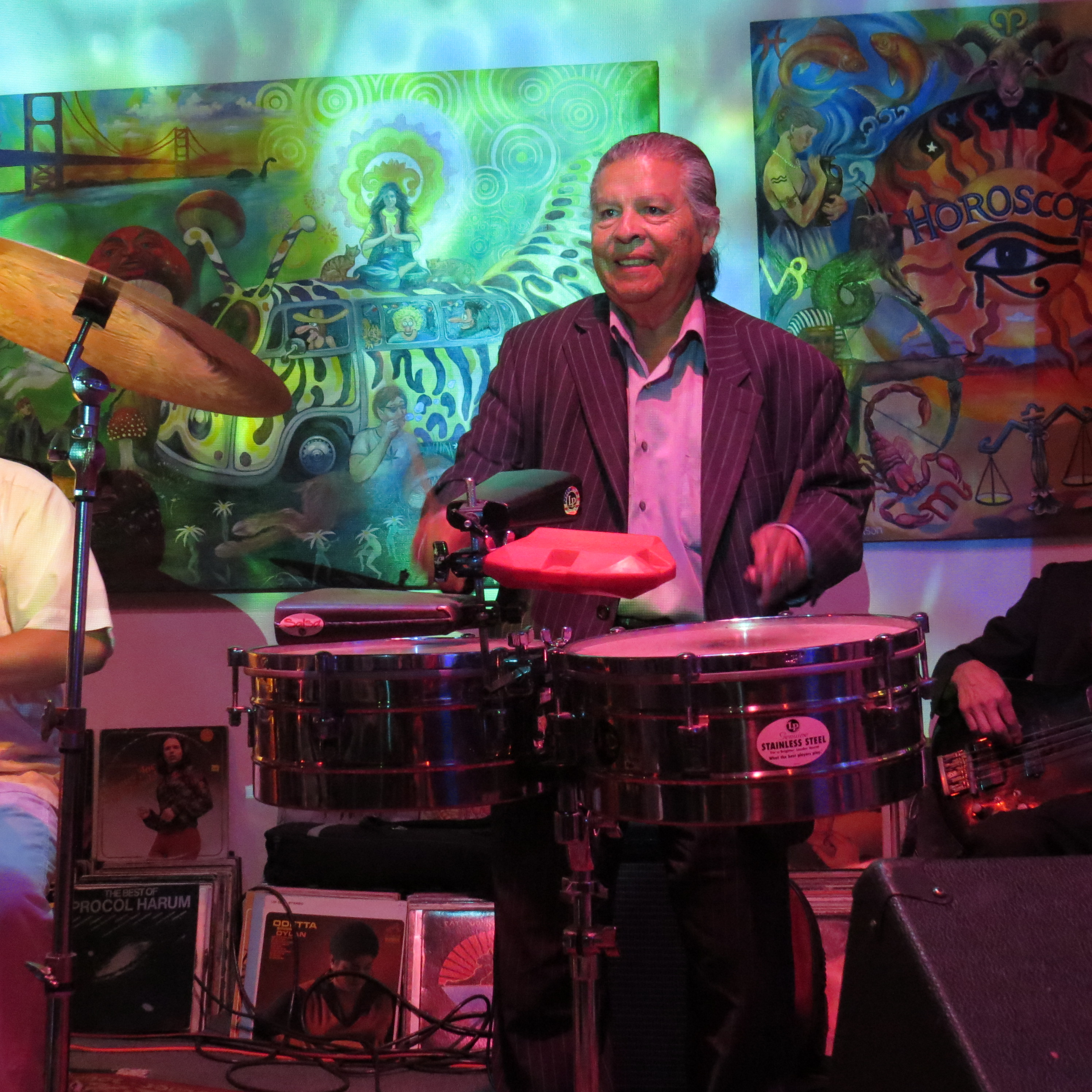
José "Chepito" Areas, the most recognized percussionist of the band Santana.

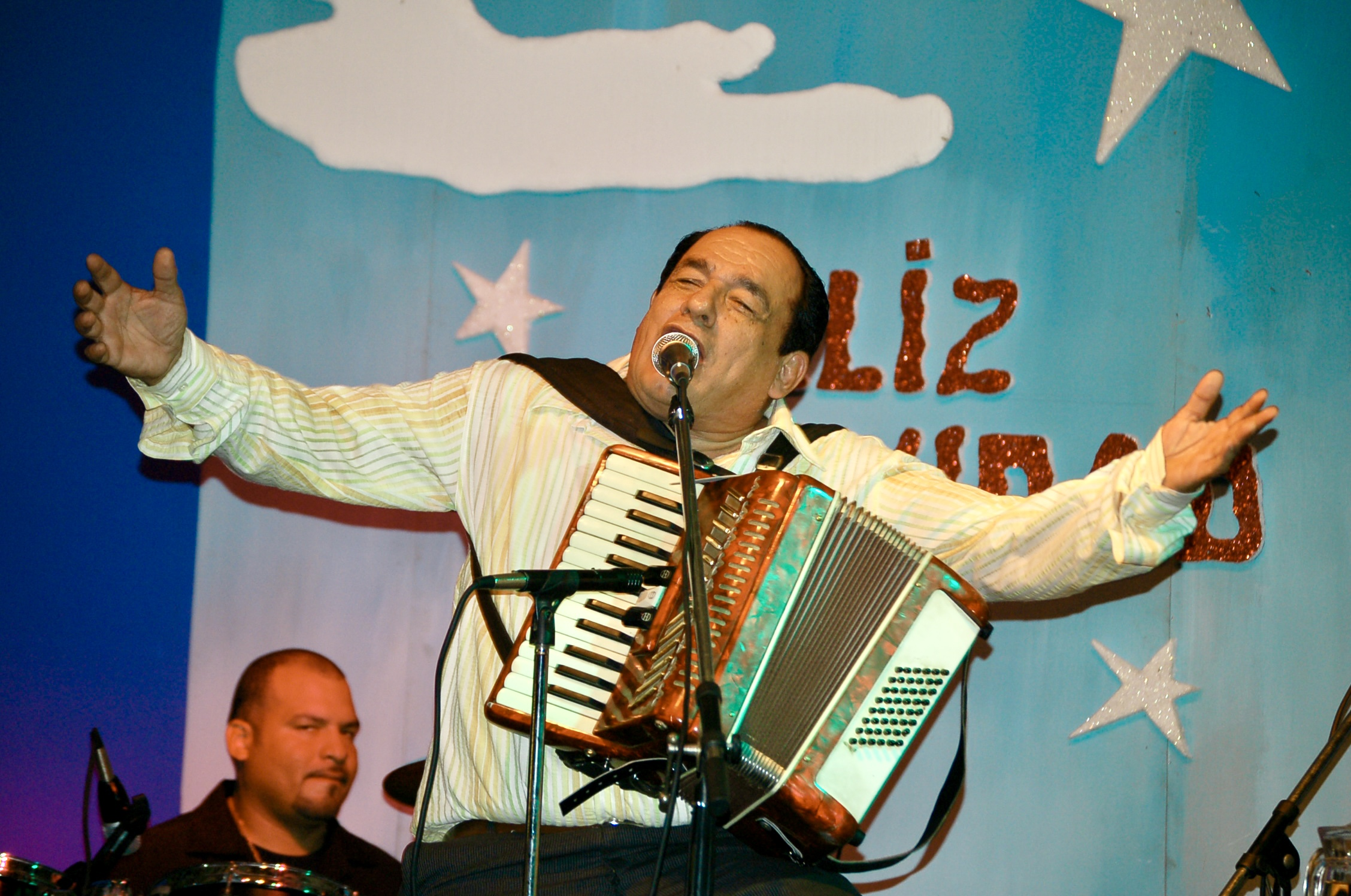
The composer Carlos Mejía Godoy, one of the main representatives of Nicaraguan traditional music.

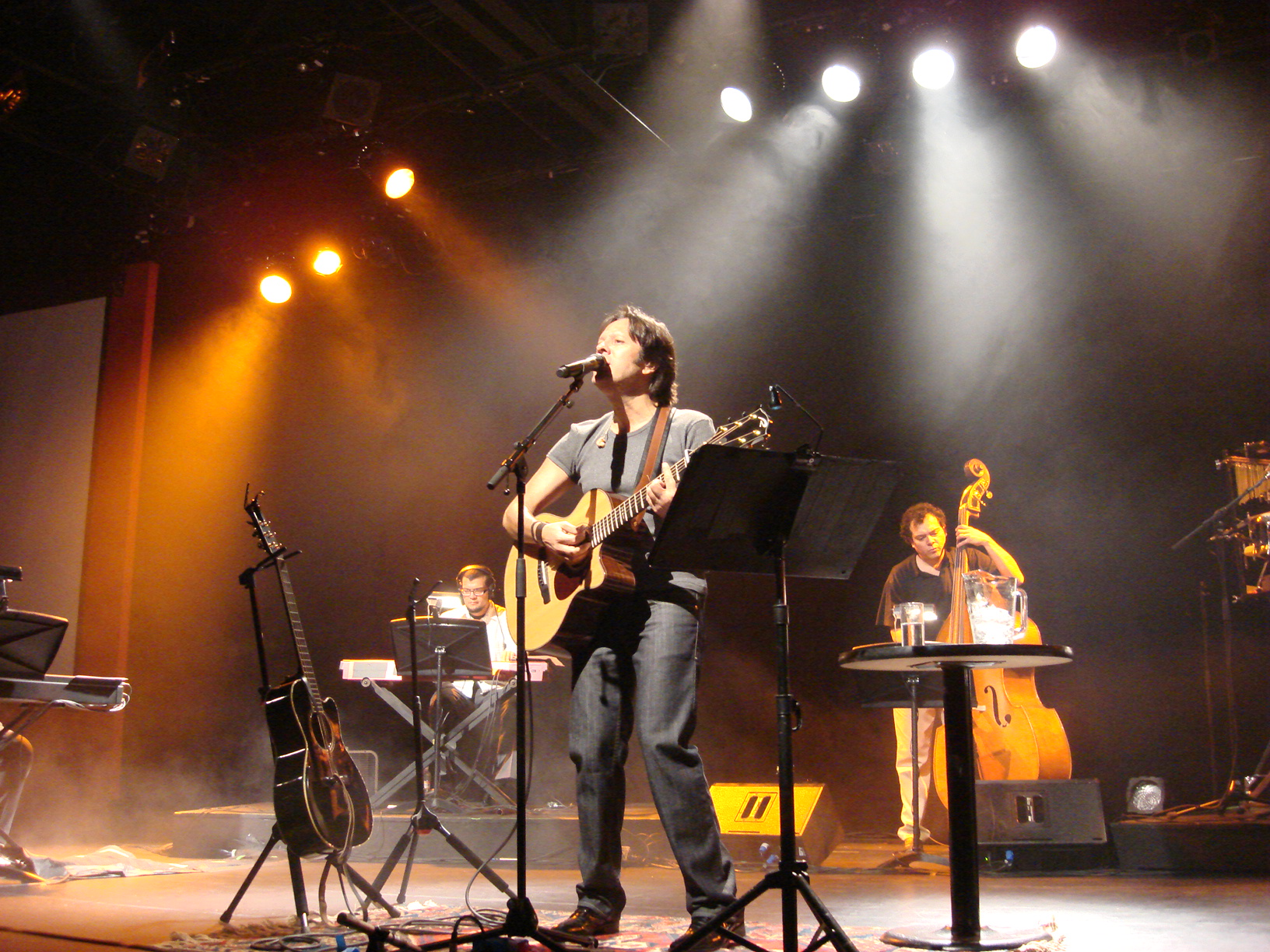
Hernaldo Zúñiga, singer-songwriter of romantic ballads.

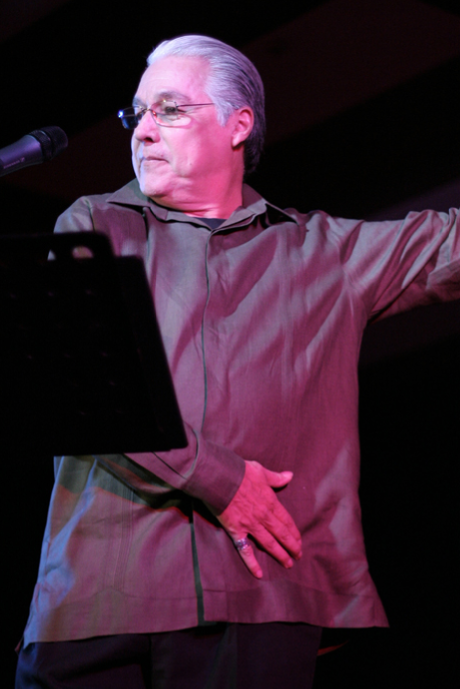
The singer-songwriter Luis Enrique Mejía Godoy, one of the leading exponents of testimonial song or nueva canción in Nicaragua.

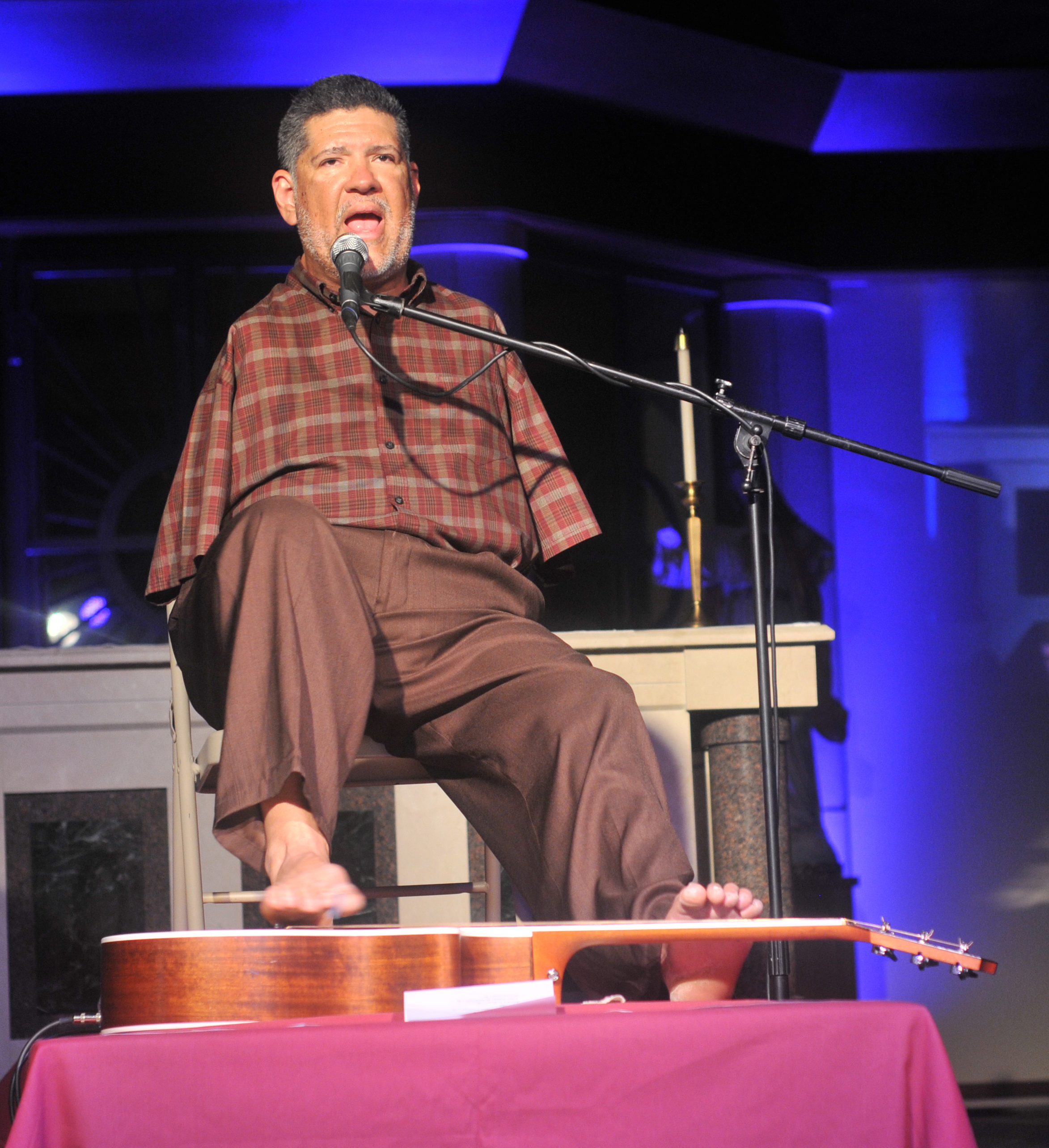
Tony Meléndez, singer and guitarist, Catholic motivational speaker.

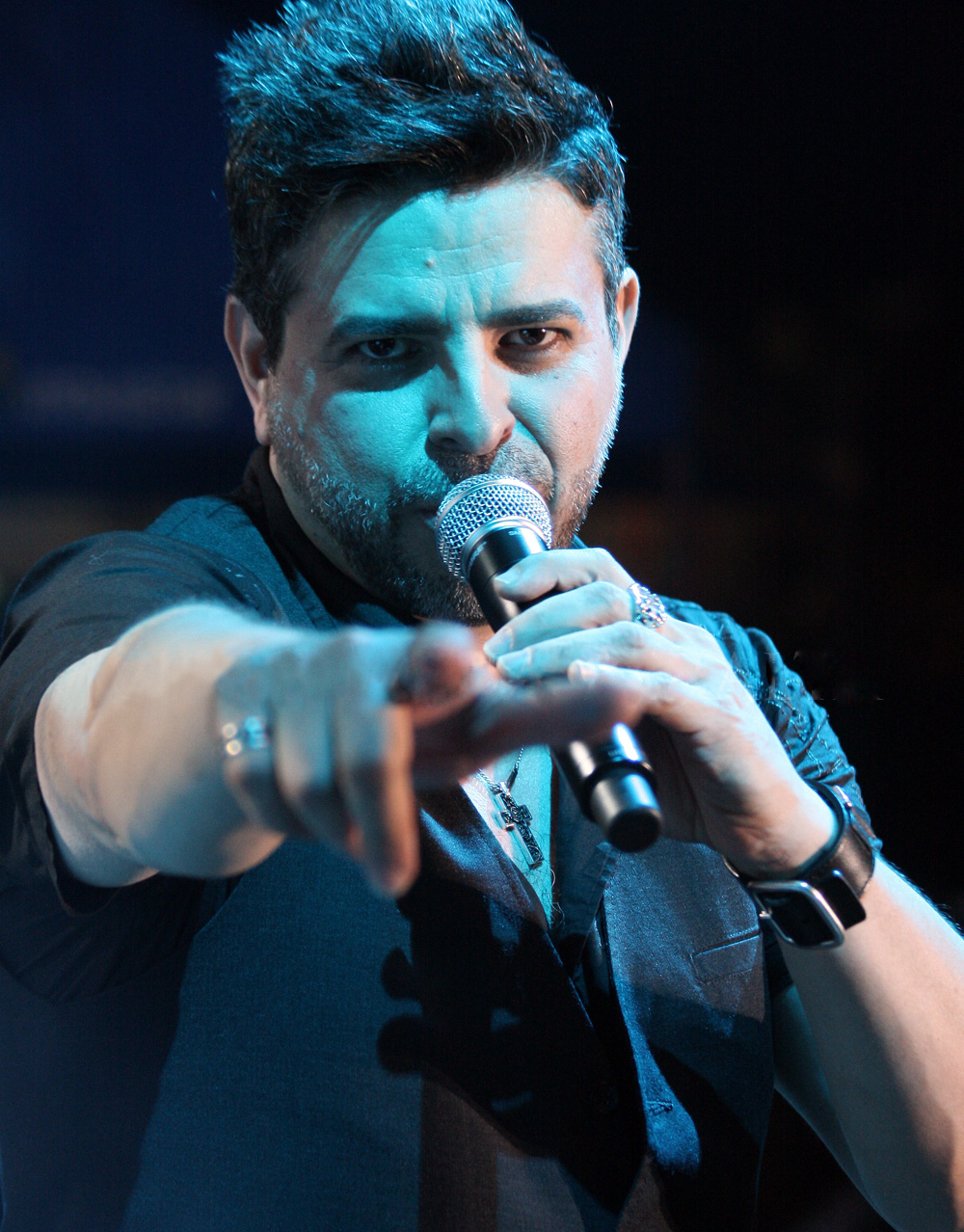
Luis Enrique, a Nicaraguan singer-songwriter of salsa romántica.

Music of Nicaragua Topics
Palo de Mayo	Indigenous	Jazz
Punta	Reggaetón	Cumbia
Pop	Rock	Hip-Hop
Marimba	Heavy metal	Classical
Folklorico	Merengue	Salsa
Reggae	Soca	Calypso
Bachata	Bongos	Garifuna
Timeline and Samples
Central American music
Belize - Costa Rica - El Salvador - Guatemala - Honduras - Nicaragua - Panama

The Music of Nicaragua contains a mixture of European, Indigenous, and African influences. Occasionally, it also rarely features Asian and Arab musical influences as well as from other countries of Hispanic and Latino origin. Musical instruments include the marimba and others that are common across Central America. Pop music includes performers from all around the world including Nicaraguans, Cubans, Brazilians, Mexicans, Panamanians, as well as those from Europe and the United States.

Nicaraguans enjoy their local artist's music but also enjoy music from around the world. They enjoy the Dominican Republic's bachata and merengue, Jamaica's reggae, Puerto Rico's salsa and reggaeton and Colombia's Cumbia among other genres including pop. Among the younger crowds, heavy metal and rock have become very popular.

== Styles of music ==
Life in Nicaragua

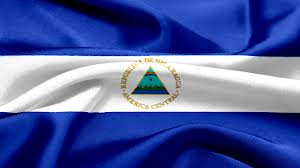

Cuisine
Culture
Demographics
Education
Holidays
Human Rights
Literature
Music
Politics
Religion
Tourism

Nicaraguan music is a mixture of different cultures from indigenous tribes, European conquerors, and slaves. Styles of music vary throughout the different regions in the country. In the Caribbean coast music with African and indigenous influence are heard, in the Pacific coast the music is considered to be a mixture of the indigenous and Spanish culture and in the North/Central region of Nicaragua the music has more of a European flavor, this is because of the significant wave of Europeans, mostly Germans, that live in the region. European influenced dances like the polka and Mazurka are also danced in this region.

Another popular musical genre in Nicaragua is the Chicheros, often consisting of a trumpet and trombone or other brass instruments, with additional musicians playing various percussion. This is often to be heard in private parties around the country.

== Instruments ==
The marimba of Nicaragua distinguishes itself from the other forms of marimba in Central America by the way it is played. Nicaragua's marimba is played by a sitting performer holding the instrument on his knees. They are usually accompanied by a bass fiddle, guitar and guitarrilla (a small guitar similar to a mandolin). This music is played at social functions as a sort of background music. The marimba is made with hardwood plates, placed over bamboo or metal tubes of varying lengths. It is played with two or four hammers.

== Theater ==
Indigenous theater groups performed with music and dance. Theatrical manifestations include the Elegant Knights of Huaco Bull and the UNESCO proclaimed masterpiece, "El Güegüense", among many others.

== Nicaraguans in Music ==
One of the most prominent composers from Nicaragua is the leonés musician José de la Cruz Mena (1874-1907). He wrote a variety of romantic waltzes that display sounds inspired by common and daily experiences, or natural scenarios. Among those compositions, we found titles such as "El Nacatamal," "Los Turcos," and "Ruinas." Besides, Mena's pieces are evocative of biblical characters and love relationship; titles like "Amores de Abraham," "Bonita Margarita," "Rosalía" are part of the most representative ones. By the time, Mena gathered popularity and influenced composers from different countries of the Americas; additionally, in the late 1800s, his name reached Asia and Europe particularly Germany and Italy inspiring Giacomo Puccini's opera La Boheme.

Another relevant composer is Luis Abraham Delgadillo, with several symphonies, stage works, orchestral pieces, chamber music, songs, and piano music to his credit, and Camilo Zapata, creator of the Nicaraguan Sound. Erwin Krüger, creator of Barrio de Pescadores (Fisherman's District). Justo Santos creator of La Mora Limpia (A Clean Coffee Bean), considered Nicaragua's popular anthem.

Other prominent national musicians, groups, and songwriters include Lía Barrios, Marcio Brenes Mejía from Somoto, Nicaragua, Katia Cardenal, Salvador Cardenal, Marina Cárdenas, Dimension Costeña, Norma Helena Gadea, Macolla, Carlos Mejía Godoy, Marcos Iván Vílchez Ruiz (known as Daz Zuvr), Luis Enrique Mejía Godoy, Luis Enrique Mejía López (known as Luis Enrique), Los Mokuanes, Sergio Tapia, and Hernaldo Zúñiga.

Of the younger generation of Nicaraguan singer-songwriters there are a few notable such as Latin Grammy Nominee Ramón Armando Mejía (Perrozompopo), Arturo Vaughan, Moisés Gadea, Juan Montenegro, Junior Escobar, Elsa Basil, Cecilia Ferrer, Alejandro Carlos Mejía, Clara Grun, Noel Portocarrero, Duo Guardabarranco, Juan Solórzano, and Marcio Brenes JR. Also, rock bands such as Necrosis, Grupo Armado, Crisis, Monroy y Surmenage, Mano de Vidrio, Contrapeso, Q69K, Kerfodermo, Resistencia, Carga Cerrada and Cecilia & The Argonauts.

Hip Hop and Reggaeton artist include Torombolo, J Smooth, Mr. Meli, Nello Style, Mayki Graff, Nica and Lingo Nicoya.

Nicaragua's Caribbean coast is home to prominent reggae singers and groups such as Philip Montalban, Carlos de Nicaragua, Kali Boom, Warrior Street, Sabu, Sabu Sr. and Osberto Jerez y los Gregory's.

Also notable instrumentalists such as guitarists Tony Melendez, Arturo Vaughan, Roberto Vaughan, Eduardo Araica, Omar Suazo, Arnulfo Oviedo, Saulo Pérez, and Andrés Sánchez, marimba player Carlos Luis Mejia, drummers Jorge Lanzas, Bikentios Chávez, Matute, Johnny Metralla, Henry Palacios, and percussionist José Areas who was inducted in the Rock & Roll Hall of Fame with the band Santana.

=== Contemporary music ===
The country's music scene has shown a growing development toward alternative rhythms and heavier genres, driven by emerging creators. In the alternative rock and metal scene is Daz Zuvr, whose work incorporates elements of gothic metal, nu metal, and alternative rock. Zuvr is also the founder of the band TheVeilers, serving as its guitarist; this project focuses on alternative rock with orchestral nuances and baroque pop. Composer Honnie Larz collaborates in this same vein, who co-wrote and performed the track "Waiting", released in collaboration with the band.

On the other hand, the rap and hip-hop scene includes Marotarap, whose compositions are characterized by social critique. Similarly, projects such as Rigoazulado, Chico Cometa, and Ceci Ceci fit within the indie pop and soul genres, characterized by a primary use of string instruments and slow-tempo compositions.
