= Lya Barrioz =

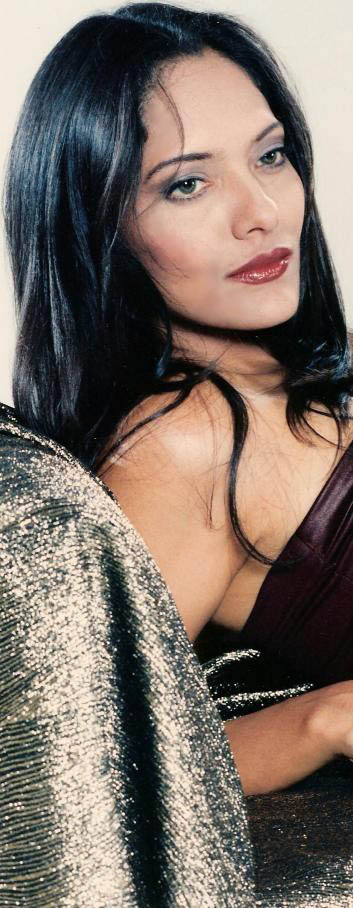

Background information
- Born: June 8
- Origin: Managua, Nicaragua
- Occupations: Singer, Producer, actress
- Years active: 1989–present
- Website: www.lyabarrioz.com

Ligia Barrios, better known as Lya Barrioz, is a Nicaraguan singer, producer, actress and an environmentalism activist, co-founder of S.O.S. BOSAWAS (a green movement that advocates for one of the world's most important biosphere reserves: Bosawás, located in Nicaragua).

== Biography ==
=== Singer ===
Barrioz took her first artistic steps in 1989 when she won 3rd place and "Most Applauded Song" in the Festival de la Canción Romántica Nicaragüense "Rafael Gastón Pérez".

In 1992 Barrioz became the lead singer of the Nicaraguan band Macolla, where she sang for almost 4 years. With this band Barrioz recorded two CDs, Sueños (Dreams) and Bailarlo Contigo (Dance it with you), signed and distributed by Sony Music label. Barrioz also holds the record of having the first music video shot in film format in the history of Nicaragua with Macolla, "Sólo Soy" (I Only Am).

In 1997 Barrioz launched her first CD as a solo artist, Razones Prohibidas (Forbidden Reasons), all songs composed and produced by Pierre Pierson). She represented Nicaragua in the OTI Festival 2000 with the song "Libera el corazón".

Barrioz has sung duos with the re-known Dominican imitator Julio Sabala; Hernaldo Zúñiga, composer of many international hits recorded by Latin stars such as Pandora (musical group) and Manuel Mijares; multi Latin Grammy winner Luis Enrique known as "el Príncipe de la Salsa"" (the Prince of Salsa)., and Alvaro Torres -"El romántico de América"

Through her career Barrioz has had invitations to many international and national events such as "Teletón de Costa Rica", "Teletón de Nicaragua", "Voces Unidas por Nicaragua", "¡Qué Viva la Tradición!" and "Homenaje a Los Beatles". As well as the inaugurations of the Acoustic Shell in Managua and the "Casino del Sol".

In 2006 Barrioz was invited by the Nicaraguan boxing champion, Ricardo Mayorga, to sing the Nicaraguan National Anthem, Salve a ti, Nicaragua, in the boxing ring before his fight with Oscar de la Hoya.

=== Actress ===
Barrioz made her debut as an actress in 2006 in the Rossana Lacayo's shortfilm Brisa Nocturna ("Night Breeze"). Brisa Nocturna has competed at over 20 international independent film festivals and has already won the following awards: "Best Actress" at the San Francisco Shortfilm Festival, "Best Artistic Direction" at the Festival de Cine de Granada and "La Réalisation Intégrale" at the "Festival du Cinéma de Bruxelles".
