= Misa Campesina Nicaragüense =

1975 music album

The Misa Campesina Nicaragüense ("Nicaraguan Peasants' Mass") is Spanish-language Mass with words and music by Carlos Mejía Godoy, incorporating a liberation theology and Nicaraguan folk music. It was composed in the artistic community of Solentiname and first performed in 1975, its liturgical use being prohibited within a few days. It has been praised by Dorothee Sölle for fully overcoming the "theological danger of docetism".

Mejía Godoy was motivated to produce a new Mass by the promulgation of the Sacrosanctum Concilium, which permitted popular and regional music in the liturgy, by the Second Vatican Council. Initially he invited the ideas of other artists but in the end composed the piece himself. Though attended the Colegio Salesiano and aspiring to the priesthood, Mejía Godoy's main influences were Marxist: the recent deaths of warrior Che Guevara and poet José Leonel Rugama, the creation of an "Iglesia Popular" (popular church) of youths agitating against the traditional hierarchy of the Roman Catholic Church.

== Performance history ==
The first performance was planned for the Plaza de los Cabros in Ciudad Sandino under the priest Fernando Cardenal, but the Mass was broken up by men of the National Guard. A few days later, the Archbishop of Managua, Miguel Obando y Bravo, prohibited its future performance in church. Nevertheless, the Misa Campesina Nicaragüense grew in popularity through clandestine celebrations that gradually spread throughout western Nicaragua. The recordings were circulated underground due to their repression by the Somoza dictatorship. Since the triunfo of the Sandinista Liberation Front in July 1979, the mass has been celebrated openly, though never by the official Catholic hierarchy.

== Recordings ==
The recordings were released on the new ENIGRAC label (Empresa Nicaragüense de Grabaciones Culturales) in 1980. The label Mantica-Waid released a CD version in December 2001 CD. The earlier Misa Popular Nicaragüense relied heavily on the son nica musical style originally from the Masaya region and popularized on the lower plains of western Nicaragua in the 1960s and 1970s. The Misa Campesina Nicaragüense broadened this musical palette to incorporate musical styles from throughout the nation, and in this sense it represents a microcosm of the many cultural regions of Nicaragua. When released the LP was the first recording in the nation's history of new music utilizing musical styles from various regions of the country.

=== Excerpt in translation ===
I believe in you, comrade,
Christ man, Christ worker,
victor over death.
With your great sacrifice
you made new people
for liberation.
You are risen
in every arm outstretched
to defend the people
against the exploitation of rulers;
you are alive and present in the hut,
in the factory, in the school.
I believe in your ceaseless struggle,
I believe in your resurrection.

=== External links ===
- La “Misa campesina nicaragüense”
- CD de la Misa Campesina Nicaragüense
- Antes que nazca el día
- Misa Campesina Nicaragüense at Enciclopedia Cecilia
