= Nicaragua in the OTI Festival =

- OTI Festival
- Participating broadcaster: Televisión de Nicaragua (Telenica); Televicentro de Nicaragua; Sistema Sandinista de Televisión (SSTV)

Participation summary
- Appearances: 23
- First appearance: 1974
- Last appearance: 2000
- Highest placement: 1st: 1977
- Participation history: 1974; 1975; 1976; 1977; 1978; 1979; 1980; 1981; 1982; 1983; 1984; 1985; 1986; 1987; 1988; 1989; 1990; 1991; 1992; 1993; 1994; 1995; 1996; 1997; 1998; 2000

The participation of Nicaragua in the OTI Festival began at the third OTI Festival in 1974. The Nicaraguan participating broadcasters were Televisión de Nicaragua (Telenica), Televicentro de Nicaragua, and the Sistema Sandinista de Televisión (SSTV), which were members of the Organización de Televisión Iberoamericana (OTI). They participated in twenty-three editions after their debut, only missing the 1978 and 1979 festivals, due to the Nicaraguan Revolution, and the 1986 festival; and won the festival once, in 1977.

== History ==
Nicaragua was the most successful of the Central American countries in the OTI Festival. In fact, they got their first and only victory in 1977 with the song "Quincho Barrilete" performed by Guayo Gonzalez. The song seemed to be a song for children, but the lyrics talked against the social injustices, denouncing the widespread poverty and the lack of sensitivity of the leading class, which was warmly welcomed by the audience and by the juries because its deep message. The song managed to win the national final despite the Anastasio Somoza Debayle regime.

Following its win in 1977, Televicentro de Nicaragua had the intention to host the contest at the Rubén Darío National Theatre in Managua, according to an internal committee of the company. However, the Nicaraguan Revolution was boosted by the Sandinistas in order to topple the dictatorship of Anastasio Somoza Debayle. The outcome of the revolution was a violent civil war which caused a human and economical catastrophe in the country, which prevented the broadcaster from submitting his candidacy. This was the first time that the winning broadcaster of the previous edition didn't host the following year.

They returned to the competition in 1980 selecting big names such as Carlos Mejía Godoy y los de Palancagüina, but the Nicaraguan results were not very successful until 1990. In the edition of 1990, which was held in Las Vegas, Katia Cardenal got a second place for her country with the song "Dame tu corazón". Since then, Telenica and Televicentro took part in the competition until the last show in 2000, in which Lya Barrioz turned into the very last Nicaraguan entrant in the event.

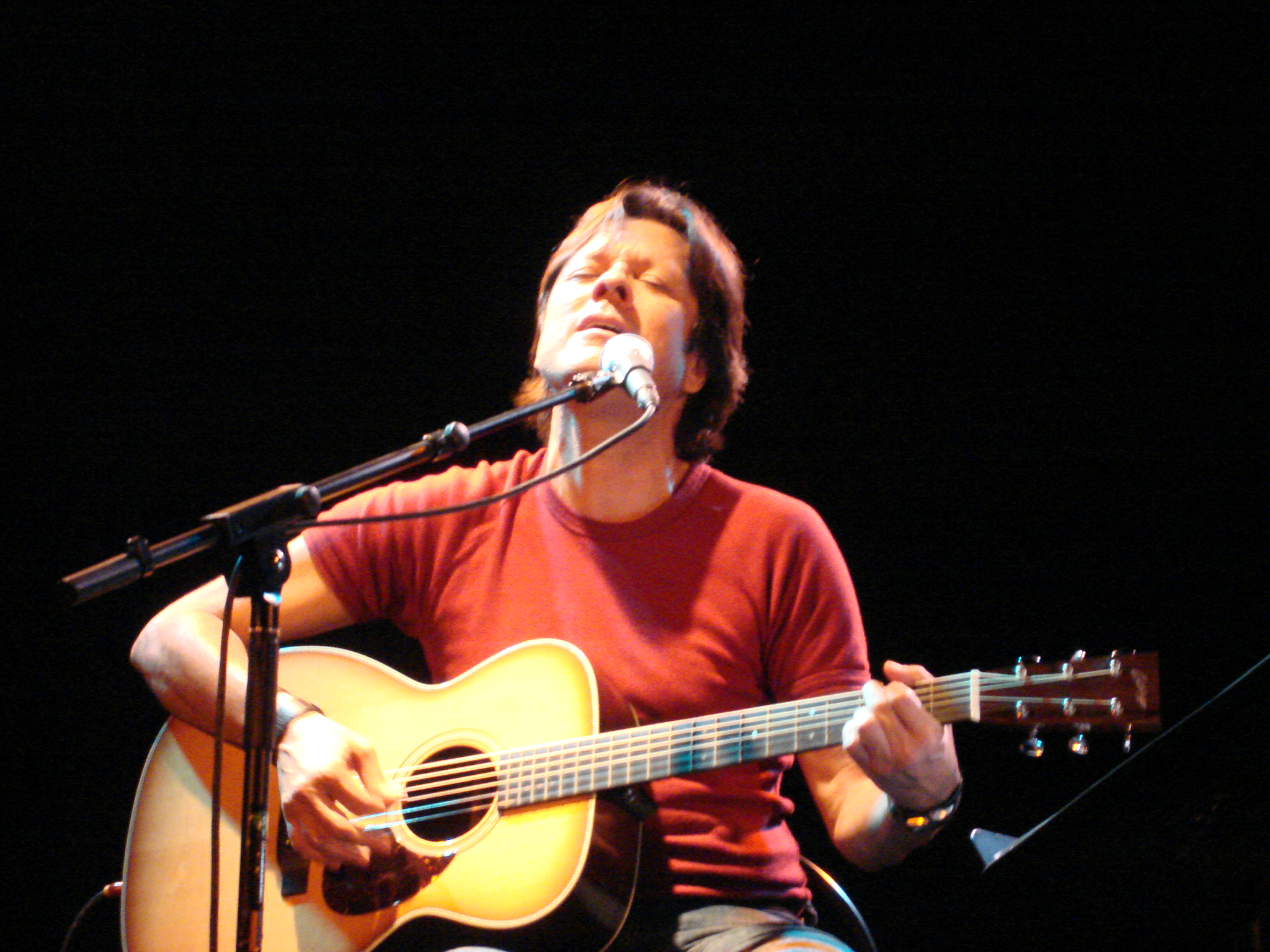
Hernaldo Zúñiga represented Nicaragua in 1974

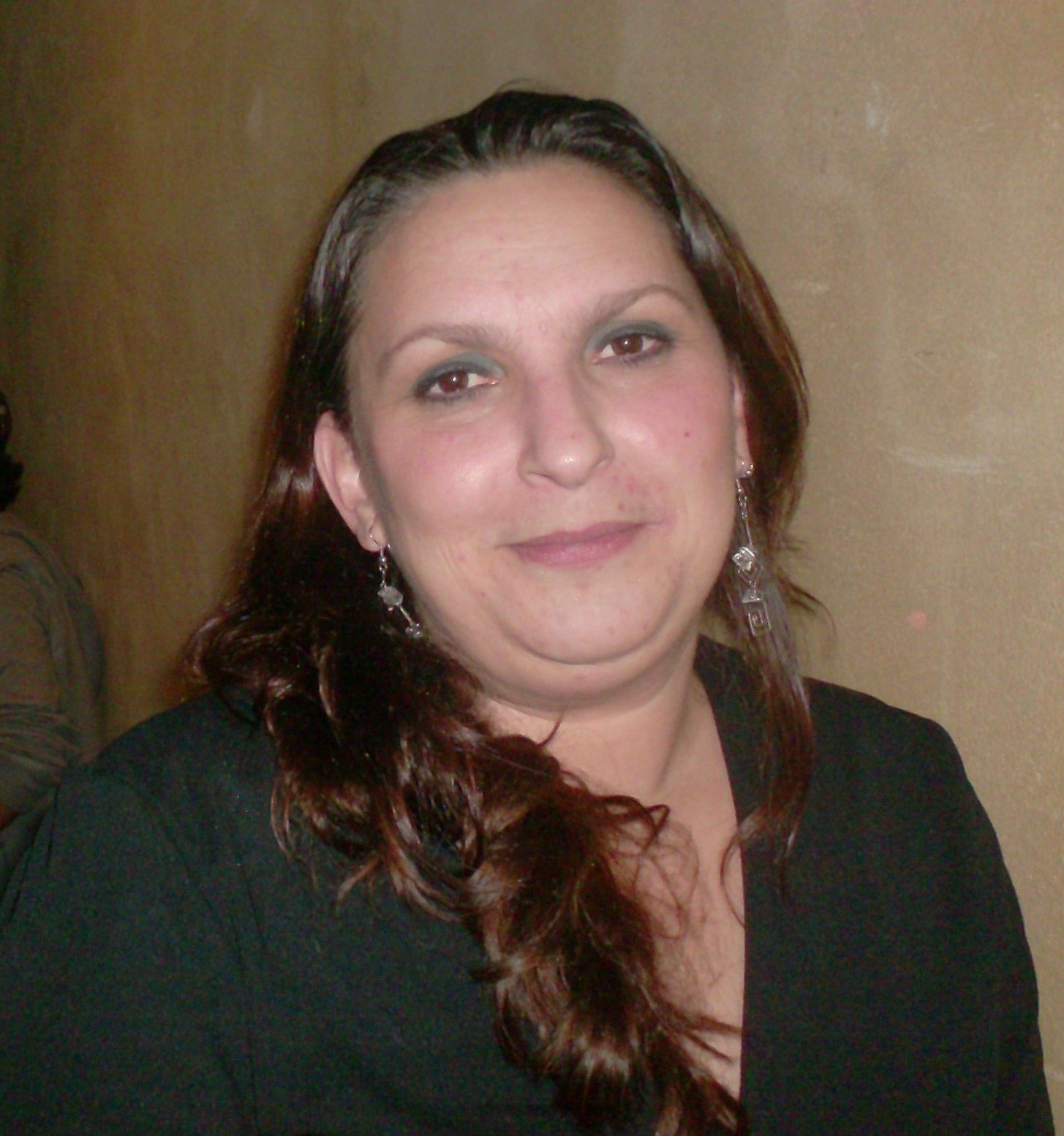
Katia Cardenal got second place in 1990

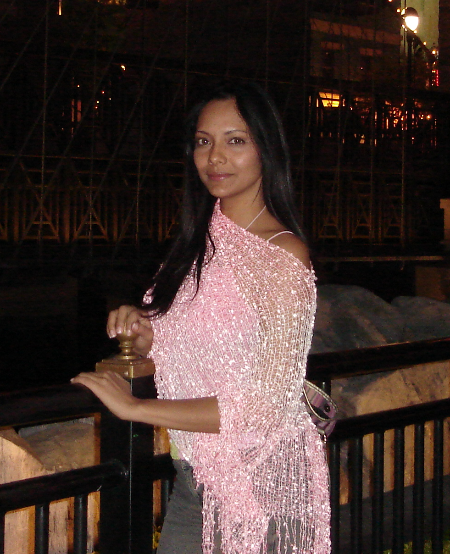
Lya Barrioz represented Nicaragua in 2000

== National Final ==
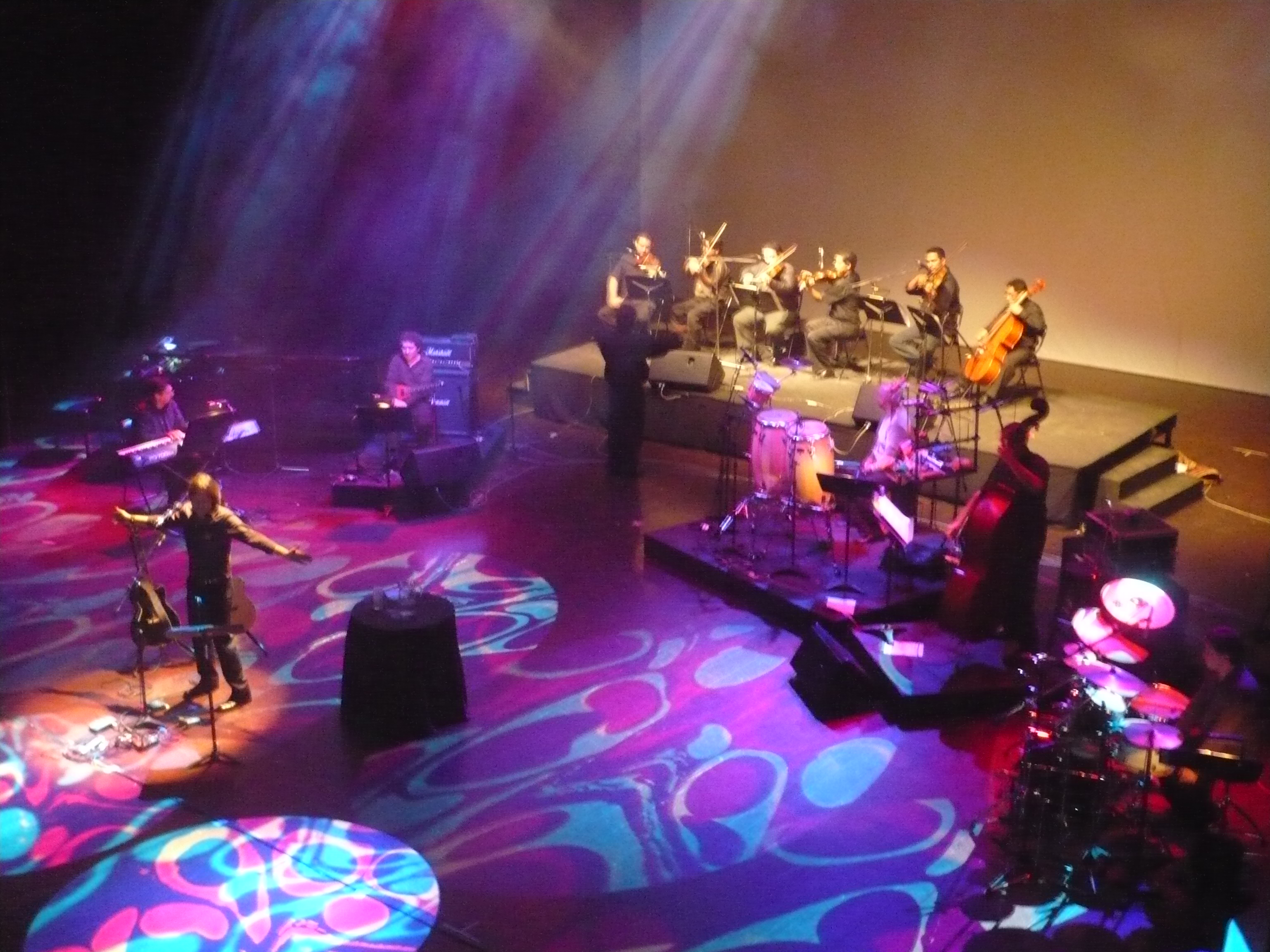
The Rubén Darío National Theatre was the venue of the Nicaraguan national for the OTI Festival.

Nicaragua, just like Mexico, Chile, Guatemala and later Cuba, held a national final which was annually organised both by Telenica and Televicentro. This national final was seen as a platform for young Nicaraguan talents who wanted to be recognised in Latin America. The usual venue of the "Nicaraguan National OTI Contest" was the Rubén Darío National Theatre and the winner of the preselection was elected by a jury composed by famous local singers, radio presenters and television personalities. The end of the main OTI festival also led to the end of this national final which was seen as a tragedy for the local musicians.

== Participation overview ==
Table key
1	First place
2	Second place
F	Finalist
SF	Semi-finalist
◇	Contest cancelled

Year	Song	Artist	Songwriter(s)	Conductor	Place	Points
1972	Did not participate					
1973	Did not participate					
1974	"Gaviota"	Hernaldo Zúñiga	Hernaldo Zúñiga	Chucho Ferrer	7	4
1975	"Quiero agradecer al mundo"	Mauricio Peña	Roger Fisher	Mandy Vizoso	8	4
1976	"De sol a sol"	Peter Vivas		Chucho Ferrer	8	3
1977	"Quincho Barrilete"	Guayo González	Carlos Mejía Godoy	Manolo Gas	1	12
1978	Did not participate					
1979	Did not participate					
1980	"La chavalita de España"	Carlos Mejía Godoy y los de Palancagüina	Carlos Mejía Godoy	Alberto Gambino	10	15
1981	"Asi te quiero yo"	Luis Enrique Mejía Godoy	Luis Enrique Mejía Godoy		8	15
1982	"Te canto porque te quiero"	Deyanira Toruño	Diego Martín Aguirre	Coco Betancourt	19	3
1983	"Pobre de ti y de mí"	René Oliver	René Oliver	Héctor Garrido	—N/a	
1984	"Vuela canción"	Violeta Rostrán	Mario Montenegro	Chucho Ferrer	—N/a	
1985	"Carta de amor para ese tiempo"	María Eugenia Urroz	Mario Montenegro	Raúl Martínez	—N/a	
1986	Did not participate					
1987	"La vida es solo un sueño"	María Lili Delgado	Emilio Ortega Ayón	Andrés Sánchez	—N/a	
1988	"Niña"	Raúl Hernández	Nelson Aragón	Francisco Cedeño	12	1
1989	"Días de amar"	Salvador y Katia Cardenal	Salvador Cardenal		—N/a	
1990	"Dame tu corazón"	Katia Cardenal	Salvador Cardenal; Reinaldo Ruiz; Danilo Amador	William Sánchez	2	—N/a
1991	"América en mis entrañas"	Martha Baltodano	Roger Fischer	César Prado	SF	—N/a
1992	"Tocando luz"	Cristian Somarriva	Eugenio Andrade		—N/a	
1993	"Cuando tengo tu amor"	Wallmaro Gutiérrez	Holvin Sandino	Raúl Martínez	—N/a	
1994	"La sombra del sol"	Álvaro Villagra	Francis Leticia Boruckin		SF	—N/a
1995	"Esa mirada"	Martha Baltodano	Manuel Ignacio Lacayo; César Prado; Peter Vivas	César Prado	—N/a	
1996	"Oh, luna"	Manuel Salvador Baltodano	Manuel Salvador Baltodano	Claudio Jácome Harb	—N/a	
1997	"Minuto a minuto"	Keyla Rodríguez			SF	—N/a
1998	"Somos"	Trío Tabú	Peter Vivas; Jaime Delgado	Jaime Delgado	SF	—N/a
1999	Contest cancelled ◇					
2000	"Libera el corazón"	Lya Barrioz	Chrystiam Somarriba; Roberto Damha; Hugo Castilla		SF	—N/a
