= Empresa Nicaragüense de Grabaciones Artísticas y Culturales =

Empresa Nicaragüense de Grabaciones Artísticas y Culturales (ENIGRAC) or The Nicaraguan Company for Artistic and Cultural Recordings. ENIGRAC was a cultural-political record label and studio that was active from 1979 to 1988. The label was founded soon after the Nicaraguan revolution and served as the Sandinista party's recording arm for Nicaragua's first Ministry of Culture. The recordings predominantly focused on politically oriented bands and culturally marginalized communities such as the Miskito, Garifuna and Creole English speaking communities, which reside in the area known today as Nicaragua's two autonomous regions.

== Background ==
ENIGRAC was founded and directed by Luis Enrique Mejia Godoy. Before becoming director of ENIGRAC, Godoy is known to have help founded the Costa Rican nueva cancion movement after being exiled in Costa Rica for 12 years. The label's principal recording engineer was Roman Cerpas Acevedo, a musician in Nicaraguan bands Poder del Alma and Bwana.

== Discography ==
ENIGRAC's discography includes over 100 recordings. The label's first full-length album consisted of Miskito music. The label also supported the popularization of palo de mayo music in the western parts of Nicaragua. ENIGRAC's most popular Creole groups include Zinica, Dimension Costeña and Grupo Gamma.

Some of ENIGRAC's discography includes:

- Dimensión Costeña. De Que Suda, Suda!. Chilamate 6004. 1984: Nicaragua.
- Grupo Libertad. En Broma y en Serio. Ocarina MC-029.1983: Nicaragua.
- Grupo Pueblo. Pueblo. ENIGRAC NCLP 5015. 1986: Nica-ragua.
- Igni Tawanka. A esas Manos que Prometen ... Ocarina. MC-008. 1983: Nicaragua.
- Los Girasoles. Los Girasoles. Chilamate 006. 1983: Nicaragua.
- Pancasán. Vamos Haciendo la Historia. Ocarina MC-011.1980: Nicaragua.
- 1er Festival de la Canción Romántica Nicaragüense, Rafael Gastón Pérez. Chilamate 003. 1983: Nicaragua.
- Zapata, Camilo. Treinta Temas Escogidos. ENIGRAC/Discos Pentagrama. n.d. (late 1980s): Mexico.
