= Cecilia & The Argonauts =

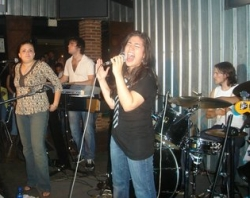
- Alfonsina Cardenal (guest artist), Jonathan Fritzén, Cecilia Ferrer and Andreas Ekstedt

Background information
- Origin: Managua, Nicaragua
- Genres: Rock en Español, Pop rock
- Years active: 2005 - present
- Members: Cecilia Ferrer Búdez; Mattias Fjellström; Janne Maninnen; Andreas Ekstedt; Jonathan Fritzén
- Website: Official Website

Cecilia & The Argonauts is a popular Nicaraguan rock band founded by Cecilia Ferrer (lead vocals), Mattias Fjellström (lead guitar), Janne Maninnen (bass), Andreas Ekstedt (drums) and Jonathan Fritzén (piano).

Cecilia Ferrer was born in Stockholm, Sweden in 1982 and has had a professional musical career in Nicaragua since 1996 when she became lead singer of the rock group Osiris. Later on, her musical career evolved to other local groups such as Stop and Macolla. Cecilia Ferrer was awarded the Z Musical Award for Best Nicaraguan Performer in 1999.

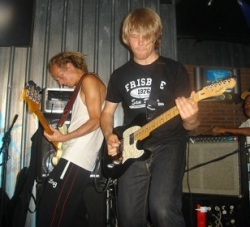
Janne Maninnen and Mattias Fjellström.

While studying in the Royal Swedish Academy of Music in 2005, Ferrer put together her band with fellow musicians from the university. The result is Cecilia & The Argonauts a Pop rock group with fusion of Latin American and European sounds.

Recently, in July 2006, the band had its first Nicaraguan tour; the Navegando Tour 2006 with four touring dates in Managua, Nicaragua. The band has received a lot of attention of the local press during this tour and two of the singles featured on this tour made it to the local music charts. The Argonauts are currently working on their debut album. Cecilia is now working as a music teacher in Stockholm.

== Discography ==
=== Albums ===
Orgánico, released on December 30, 2009, as free music, under a Creative Commons license. It can be downloaded from the Jamendo and Rocknica websites.

=== Singles ===
- Instanto Animal - (#1, four weeks, Radio Futura Top 15)
- Sin Sentido - (#9, two weeks, Radio Futura Top 15)
- Any Sense
- El Viaje
- Other Side
- I Wait
- Better Weather
- Días
