= Katia Cardenal =

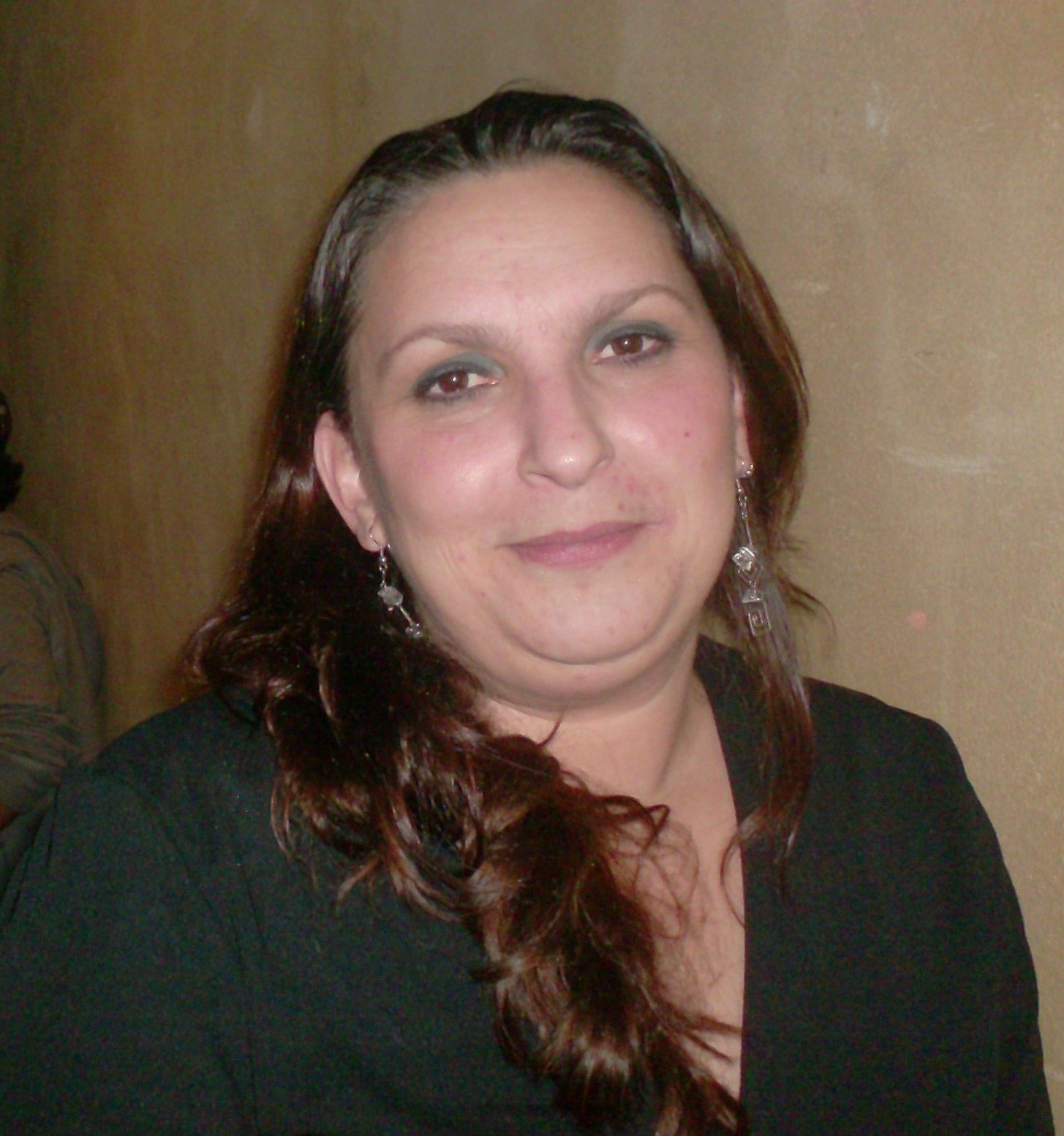
Katia Cardenal

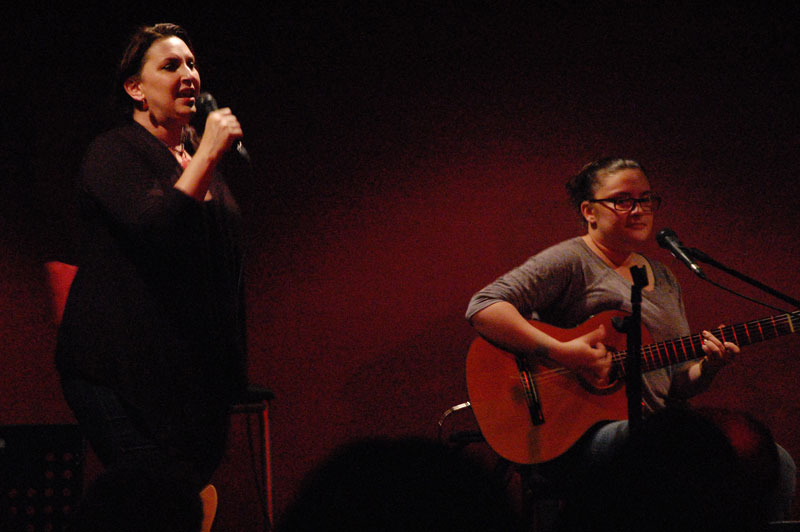
Singer Katia Cardenal from Nicaragua and her daughter at Guatemala's Trovajazz Club in August 2013

Katia Cardenal (born June 19, 1963, in Managua, Nicaragua) is a Nicaraguan singer, songwriter, and part of the nueva trova movement. Katia and her brother Salvador Cardenal formed Duo Guardabarranco, one of the leading proponents of nueva trova, known for the songs "Guerrero del amor", "Guardabosques", "Casa Abierta". and "Colibri".

== Biography ==
Katia Cardenal was born in Nicaragua in 1963. She became a fan of popular music at an early age, singing in the chorus at El Colegio Teresiano chorus in Managua. She began to perform in public with her brother Salvador when they were 16. They called themselves the Duo Guardabarranco after the national bird of Nicaragua. She was not only recognized by people in her country but also internationally by the supporters of Movimiento de la Nueva Canción Latinoamericana. With a few years of experience she began to tour the Americas and Europe.

In 1984 she graduated as a musical educator from the Escuela de Música de Managua in 1984. From 1984 to 1994 she worked in schools as a flute and solfa teacher. She has worked with musicians from Norway, Nicaragua, and Sweden but has remained faithful to the songs that inspired her at the beginning of her career. In 2004, she started the record label Moka Discos. She has performed in Austria, Canada, Chile, Colombia, Costa Rica, Cuba, Czechoslovakia, Denmark, Ecuador, El Salvador, England, Finland, Germany, Guatemala, Honduras, Italy, Luxemburgo, Mexico, Norway, Panama, Puerto Rico, Russia, Spain, Sweden, Switzerland, and the United States.

She represented Nicaragua in the OTI Festival 1989 with the song "Días de amar" along Salvador Cardenal. She represented its country again in the OTI Festival 1990 as a solo artist with "Dame tu corazón" placing second.

== Discography ==
- Navegas por Las Costas (Kirkelig Kulturverksted, 1999)
- Ven a Mi Casa Esta Navidad (Kirkelig Kulturverksted, 2000)
- En Reveslandia (Kirkelig Kulturverksted, 1999)
- Taube Pa Spanska: Fragancia (Kirkelig Kulturverksted, 2001)
- Messe for Kari Og Ola: Misa Campesina (Kirkelig Kulturverksted, 2008)
- Sueno de una Noche de Verano (Kirkelig Kulturverksted, 2001)
- Hojarasca (Majo, 2004)
- “ Mariposa de alas rotas” (MOKA 2007)
- ‘’ Misa campesina nicaragüense’’ (MOKA 2008)
- “ Trampolín” (MOKA 2017)
- “ Basta un suspiro” (MOKA 2018)
- “Aletea” (Dearlion 2020)

== See also ==
- Music of Nicaragua
- Duo Guardabarranco
