= Alejandro Vega Matus =

Nicaraguan composer

Alejandro Vega Matus (August 17, 1873 – November 26, 1937) was a Nicaraguan composer. He founded his own orchestra in 1894, which grew to become one of Nicaragua's most prominent groups. Matus was a prolific composer, particularly known for his waltzes.

== Biography ==
Matus was born on August 17, 1873, in Masaya, Nicaragua. His father was Pablo Vega y Raudes, a composer. His family included many musicians, including the composer of "Salve a ti, Nicaragua", the Nicaraguan national anthem. Matus studied music as a child with Don Carmen and later moved to Guatemala where Giovanni Aberle taught him at the Guatemalan Conservatory of Music. However, Grove Music Online describes him as "essentially self-taught".

He eventually returned to Nicaragua in 1894, founding and conducting an orchestra, Orquesta Vega Matus. Grove Music Online writes that the group grew to become the "unrivalled musical performance group of dance and semi-classical music in the nation." He died on November 26, 1937, in Masaya. Matus was well known and respected during his lifetime, and was one of the first composers in the region seeing their music recorded and distributed.

Matus composed numerous works, predominantly funeral marches and church music; including 4 symphonic poems, 2 string quintets, 3 operettas, 10 zarzuelas, 5 overtures, 107 funeral marches, and 9 intermezzos. His waltzes were particularly well known and popular. In 2008 Matus was described in Culture and Customs of Nicaragua as one of the "four most important academic composers in the history of music in Nicaragua", together with Luis Abraham Delgadillo, Carlos Alberto Ramirez, and José de la Cruz Mena. He has been cited as one of the most important composers in the country of his era, along with Mena.

== Bibliography ==
- White, Steven F.; Calderón, Esthela (2008). Culture and customs of Nicaragua. Westport, Conn.: Greenwood Press. ISBN 978-0-313-33994-3.
- Ficher, Miguel (2002). Latin American classical composers: a biographical dictionary. Lanham, Md.: Scarecrow Press. ISBN 978-0-8108-4517-6.
- The Garland encyclopedia of world music. New York: Garland Pub. 1998. ISBN 978-0-8240-6035-0.
