= ¿Cómo te va mi amor? =

Single by Pandora, Los Horóscopos de Durango

from the album "Pandora" (Pandora); "Desatados" (Los Horóscopos de Durango)
- Released: 1985 (Pandora); 2006 (Los Horóscopos de Durango)
- Genre: Pop ballad (Pandora) Regional Mexican (Duranguense ranchera) (Los Horóscopos de Durango)
- Length: 3:37 (Pandora); 3:25 (Los Horóscopos de Durango)
- Songwriter: Hernaldo Zúñiga

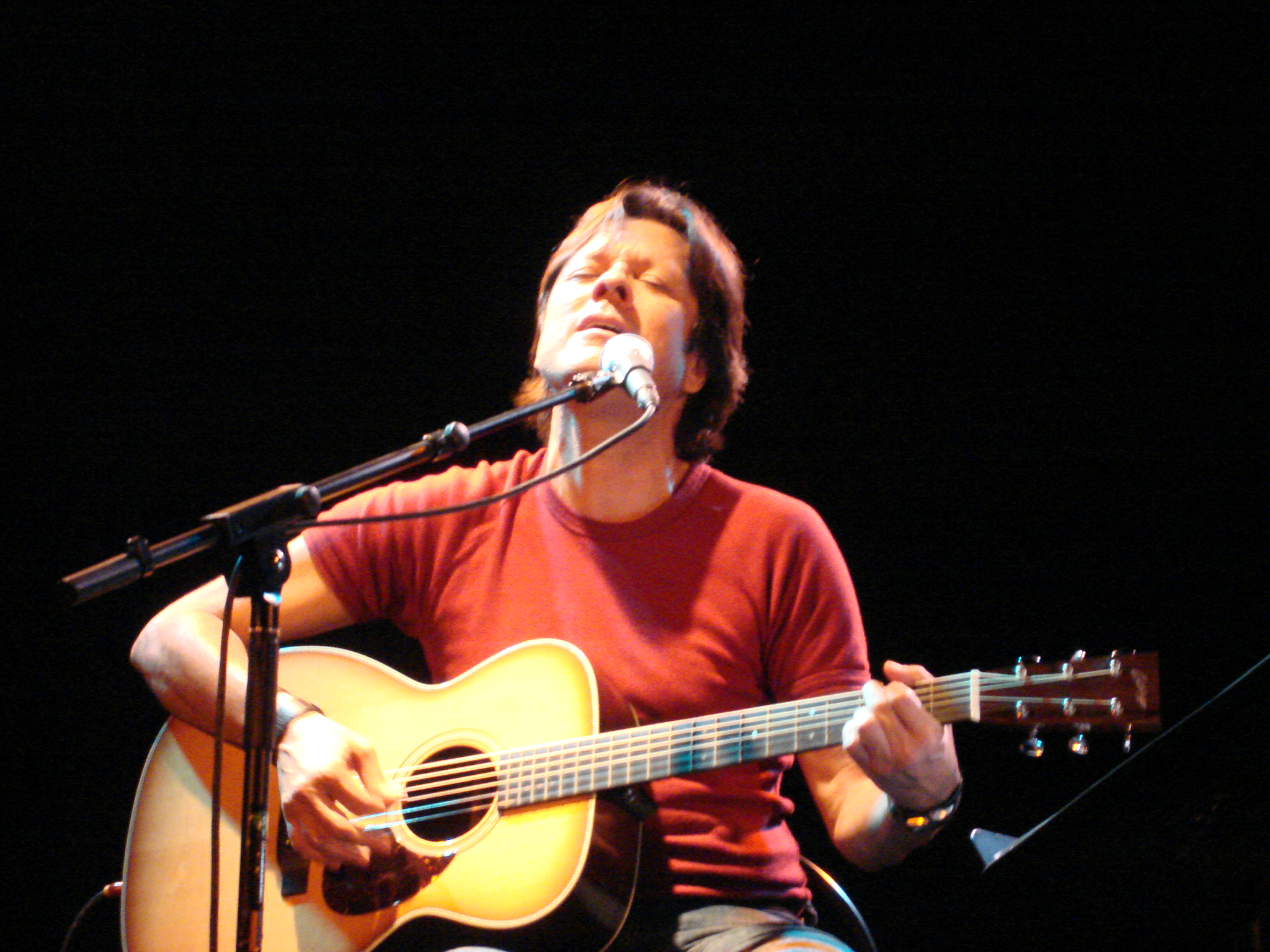
The song's composer Hernaldo Zúñiga

¿Cómo te va mi amor? (How is it going my love?) is a song written by Hernaldo Zúñiga, and first made famous by Mexican group Pandora.

== Background ==
Pandora made their professional debut on 2 June 1985, on the TV program "Siempre en Domingo" (Always on Sunday), where they interpreted the song "¿Cómo te va mi amor?", from the Nicaraguan composer Hernaldo Zúñiga. Less than a week later their first production in LP format was released, simply titled "Pandora", which by October of the same year had gone gold.

"¿Cómo te va mi amor?" was included in that debut album and defined the group's romantic style. The song was both the first single to be promoted by the group and their first international hit. Due to its success, Pandora instantly received a warm welcome to the music industry.

Pandora's original version was nominated for a Grammy Award for Best Latin Pop Performance at the 29th Annual Grammy Awards. At the end of 2007, the song was included on the VH1 Latin America channel countdown of the 100 Best Songs of the 80's in Spanish at number 16.

Since Pandora's success with the song, many other artists have made cover versions, extending in this way the importance of this melody into the musical romantic world. Among the singers that have interpreted the song are: Hernaldo Zúñiga himself (live), Luis Miguel and Pandora (live duet), Los Horóscopos de Durango, Patricia Manterola, Nicho Hinojosa, Fher Manjarrez, Área 305, Freddy y Los Nobles, La Rondalla de Saltillo, Chicos De Barrio, Tierra Canela, Myriam, Marcos Orozco y Rebelde, Secuencia con Banda, Grupo Cuarto Para Las Tres, Los Reales, Banda Perla de Michoacán, Santa Elena, La Chío, Luis Antonio Hernández, Zania, Sheila y Lizzette (Operación Fama), Pio Treviño y Majic and others.

The 2006's versión by Los Horóscopos de Durango was nominated for the 2008 Billboard Latin Music Award in the category "Regional Mexican Airplay Song of the Year, Female Group or Female Solo Artist".

On 16 May 2008, the version by Los Horóscopos de Durango, which sold more than one million copies during 2007, won the Latin Award 2007 Best Regional Song delivered by The American Society of Composers, Authors & Publishers (ASCAP), the main American composers society. The song's composer, Hernaldo Zúñiga, received a tribute during the ceremony. This song released for the first time in 1985, still awarded in 2008 (23 years later), has demonstrated that was composed to surpass the barrier of the years and even those of the musical genres.
