= Pandora (group) =

Mexican singing group

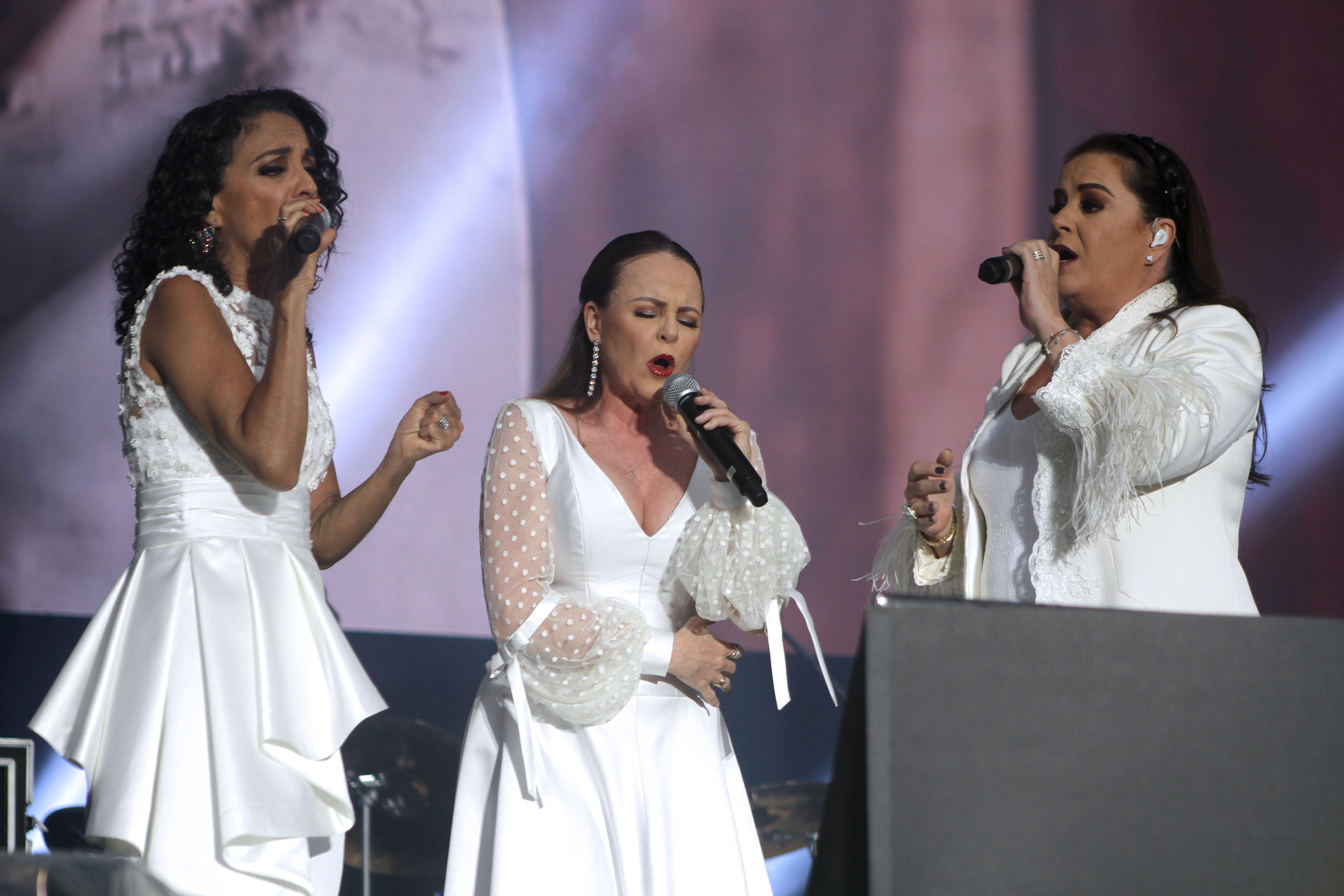
- Pandora in October 2019; L–R: Fernanda Meade, Mayte Lascurain, and Isabel Lascurain

Background information
- Origin: Mexico City, Mexico
- Genres: Latin pop
- Years active: 1985–present
- Labels: EMI Mexico; Sony Mexico
- Members: Fernanda Meade; Isabel Lascurain; Mayte Lascurain
- Past members: Liliana Abaroa

Pandora is a Mexican girl group formed in Mexico City in 1981 by sisters Isabel and Mayte Lascuráin and their cousin Fernanda Meade. Originally named Trébol, the trio adopted the name Pandora after signing with EMI-Capitol México in 1984. Dubbed by the Latin Recording Academy as the "most iconic female trio in Spanish-language music", they have sold more than 10 million records worldwide, making them one of the best-selling Latin music acts.

The group achieved major commercial success in the Latin music, placing eleven singles in the top 10 of the Billboard Hot Latin Songs chart. Pandora's best-known hits include "¿Cómo Te Va Mi Amor?", the iconic title theme of the 1998 telenovela La Usurpadora, and their Spanish-language version of "Without You", which reached number-one. Their accolades include two Grammy nominations, three Lo Nuestro Awards, and the Latin Grammy Lifetime Achievement Award.

== Background ==
During their school years, the Lascuráin sisters and some friends participated as a group in various music festivals, calling themselves "Las Jeans". Later, Fernanda Meade, their cousin, joined Isabel and Mayte to form a trio called "Trebol". Under this name they recorded an album for RCA Victor in 1981 entitled El día que me quieras (The Day That You Love Me).

From 1981 to 1984 the group established itself doing backup vocals for artists such as Emmanuel and Pedro Vargas (who is the sisters' godfather), and backup vocals for the group Timbiriche. On 29 November 1984, the group signed a record deal with EMI and became Mexico's first all-female musical trio in thirty years. The artistic director of EMI Capitol Mexico, Luis Moyano, renamed the group "Pandora" after the first woman created on Earth in Greek mythology.

In May 1989, Meade left the group to pursue a solo career and was replaced by Liliana Abaroa. Meade returned to the group in 1997 and has continued with them since.

== Fame and legacy ==
Their signature song is a composition by singer-songwriter Hernaldo Zúñiga titled "¿Cómo te va mi amor?" (Eng.: "How have you been my love?") which was recently included on the VH1 countdown of the 100 Best Songs of the 80s in Spanish at number 16.

Pandora peaked at number one in the Billboard Hot Latin Tracks in 1993 with their rendition of "Without You", titled "Desde el Día Que Te Fuiste", taken from their cover album Ilegal. The album received a nomination for Pop Album at the Lo Nuestro Awards of 1993 and Pandora won for Pop Group of the Year. The following year, they appeared as guest artists on Plácido Domingo's Grammy-nominated album, De Mi Alma Latina.

Pandora's music can be classified as Latin Pop, though some of their later albums feature much more traditional Mexican composition. Pandora borrows heavily from other performers and songwriters. The trio has covered many songs of Juan Gabriel, Manuel Alejandro, and Hernaldo Zúñiga. These covers make up a large part of their performance repertoire.

After issuing Pandora Otra Vez in 1986, Fernanda Meade, Isabel Lascurian, and Mayte Lascurian had the opportunity to perform live in the U.S. while participating in a tribute to Plácido Domingo at Los Angeles' Universal Amphitheater, moving to Europe to make Huellas a year later. While touring America to promote Hace Tres Noches Apenas, a traditional Mexican music album, Pandora's live performance at Mexico City's Metropolitan Theater was recorded on 8 May 1998, released as Pandora 1985/1998.

To celebrate the 25th anniversary of their debut, the three original members of Pandora reunited in 2010 to release a new album, Pandora - De Plata, which consisted of covers, duets, and re-recordings of their old hits.

== Discography ==
Studio albums

- Pandora (1985)
- Otra Vez (1986)
- Huellas (1987)
- Buenaventura (1988)
- 999 Razones (1989)
- Con Amor Eterno (1991)
- Ilegal (1992)
- Con Amor Eterno Vol. II (1993)
- Confesiones (1995)
- Hace Tres Noches Apenas (1997)
- Vuelve a Estar Conmigo (1999)
- En Carne Viva (2002)
- Por eso... Gracias (2004)
- De Plata (2010)
- En el Camino (2013)
- Pandora 30 (2015)
- Navidad con Pandora (2016)
- Más Pandora que nunca (2019)
- Pandora 40 (2025)

Live albums

- Pandora 1985/1998 (1998)
- En Acústico (2006)
- XXV Años En Vivo (2011)
- Inesperado Tour (2022)

== Awards ==
=== Grammy Awards ===
Year	Nominee / work	Award	Result
1985	"Cómo Te Va Mi Amor"	Latin Pop Performance	Nominated
1992	...Con Amor Eterno	Latin Pop Album, Vocal or Instrumental	Nominated

=== Lo Nuestro Awards ===
Year	Nominee / work	Award	Result
1990	Pandora	Pop Duo or Group	Nominated
1991	Pandora	Pop Duo or Group	Nominated
1992	Con Amor Eterno	Pop Album of the Year	Won
1992	Pandora	Pop Duo or Group	Won
1993	Ilegal	Pop Album of the Year	Nominated
1993	Pandora	Pop Duo or Group	Won
1994	Pandora	Pop Duo or Group	Nominated
1998	Pandora	Pop Duo or Group	Nominated
