= Duo Guardabarranco =

Nicaraguan musical duo

Dúo Guardabarranco was a Nicaraguan duo consisting of siblings Katia Cardenal and Salvador Cardenal. The duo has been a significant worldwide ambassador for Nicaraguan and Latin-American folk music for the last three decades, and has gained a broad international audience with their poetic lyrics about hope, peace and justice, wrapped in their outstanding harmonies and melodies. They are named after the Nicaraguan national bird, the Turquoise-browed motmot, locally referred to as Guardabarranco.

== Biography ==
Katia and Salvador Cardenal began singing together in 1980 in Managua after the Sandinistas ended the dictatorship of Gen. Anastasio Somoza. The Duo joined the new government's Literacy Campaign, and with scores of other high-school students, traveled to teach reading to adults in rural areas of Nicaragua.

In the early 1980s, a new musical movement was spreading through Central America, that of nueva canción (new song), a non-partisan, humanistic and often gentle trend toward folk music about social issues. Guardabarranco's style fit well into the category, although the siblings' compositions have eschewed specific issues of global politics in favor of personal truths and uplifting spirit. The duo's delicate tunes combine elements of traditional folk and pop music forms and address subjects such as hope, nature, respect, justice, love and introspection, without indulging in polemics.

Salvador's song "Guerrero del Amor" ("Warrior of Love", with lyrics by Costa Rican singer-songwriter Rosy Soley) served as the inspiration for the 1996 movie Carla's Song, directed by noted English filmmaker Ken Loach. "Guerrero del Amor" is a prime example of the duo's goal to communicate personal means through universal truths.

Together, the siblings have released such albums as Si Buscabas, Dias de Amar and Casa Abierta, toured the U.S. six times and performed with Silvio Rodríguez, Pete Seeger, Bruce Cockburn, Melissa Etheridge and benefactor Jackson Browne, among other musical luminaries.

On a global scale, they have played throughout Central and South America, as well as in Eastern Europe, Norway, Finland, Spain, Germany, Great Britain, North Korea, the former Soviet Union, Canada and the United States. The Duo placed second in the OTI International Song Festival 1990, with the song "Dame tu Corazón.”

Salvador Cardenal died on March 8, 2010, after a long battle with cryoglobulinemia.

== Discography ==
Studio albums

- Un Trago de Horizonte (1982)
- Si Buscabas (1985)
- Días De Amar (1991)
- Casa Abierta (1994)
- Verdadero Pan (2003)
- Soy Juventud (2009)

Live albums

- Una noche con Guardabarranco (2001)
- Live in Tucson 1991 (2020)

Compilation albums

- Antología (1995)
- Cancionero (2004)
- Dale Una Luz / Canciones Compartidas (2007)
- Cronología (2011)
- Inéditas Vol. 1 1983-1985 (2021)
- Inéditas Vol. 2 (Demos 1987-1989) (2021)

== See also ==
- Music of Nicaragua
- Katia Cardenal
