= La Cuneta Son Machín =

Nicaraguan band

- Also known as: La Cuneta
- Origin: Nicaragua
- Years active: 2009–present
- Website: lacunetasonmachin.com

La Cuneta Son Machín, also known as La Cuneta, is a Grammy-nominated musical group from Nicaragua. The original group consisted of Carlos Luis Mejía, Augusto Mejía (both sons of famous Nicaraguan singer Carlos Mejía Godoy), Carlos Guillén Mejía (Frijol), Fabio Buitrago, Omar Suazo, and Cesar Rodriguez.

== History ==
La Cuneta Son Machín formed in 2009 while the members (who are friends and cousins) spontaneously joined the Santo Domingo Festival parade in Managua, Nicaragua. Their name comes from "La Cuneta" (the sidewalk) and "Son Machín", from the English phrase "sound machine." Every year, they play a free concert to celebrate the beginnings of their group.

La Cuneta's third album Mondongo (2015) produced by San Francisco-based Greg Landau, was nominated for Best Latin Rock Urban or Alternative Album in the 58th Annual Grammys. They are the first Nicaraguan band to be nominated for a Grammy.

The group has toured in Europe and the United States, including at the SXSW festival in 2018 and 2023. In 2018 The New York Times named them an "act that stood out", noting their "frisky cumbias and high-velocity polkas" and lyrics describing "food, love, drinking and dancing — especially food."

== Musical style ==
La Cuneta incorporates Nicaraguan regional slang extensively in their music. The group's music blends cumbia and rock with traditional Nicaraguan music. The instruments also blend Nicaraguan tradition with the new: accordion and marimba with electric guitar. The group has been noted as an important part of Nicaragua's cultural scene by both Nicaraguans and visitors.

== Line-up ==
For their album Mondogo, the group members are:

- Carlos Luis "La Bujilla" Mejía (marimba, timbales)
- Carlos "Frijol" Guillen (lead singer)
- Ernesto "Matute" López (drums, backup vocals)
- Omar "El Profesor" Suazo (guitars)
- César "El Puma" Rodriguez (keyboards)
- Augusto "El Negro" Mejía (bass, backup vocals)
- Christian Pepin (percussion)
- Camilo Landau (guitar)
- Fabio Buitrago

== Discography ==
=== Albums ===
- El Zafarrancho (2010)
- Amor Fritanguero (2012)
- Mondongo (2015)
- Cañambuco (2017)

=== Singles ===
- La Argolla (2021) ft. Deuce Eclipse
