= Rubén Darío National Theatre =

National theatre of Nicaragua

Coordinates: 12.1583°N 86.2748°W

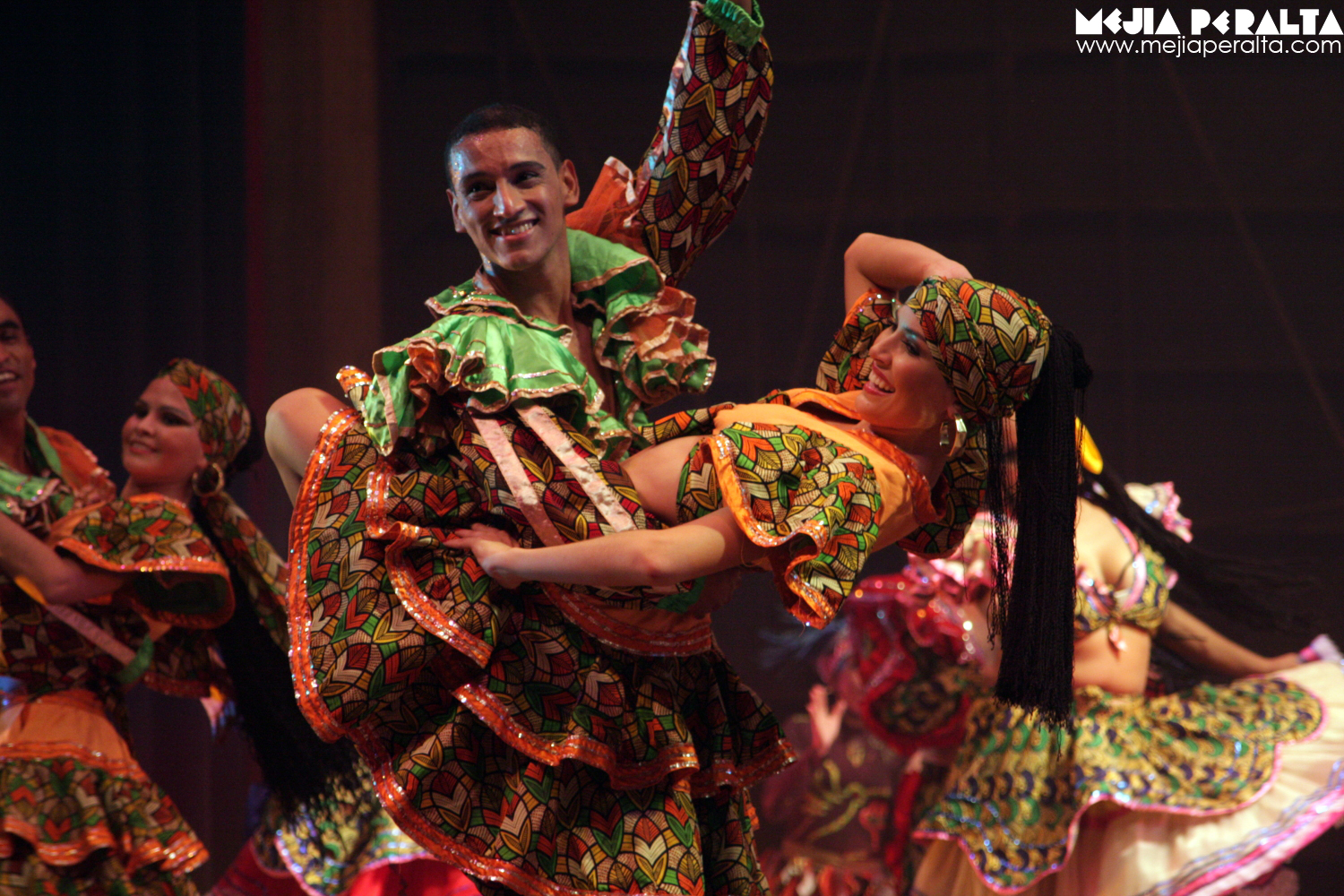
A performance of the Palo de Mayo at the Theatre.

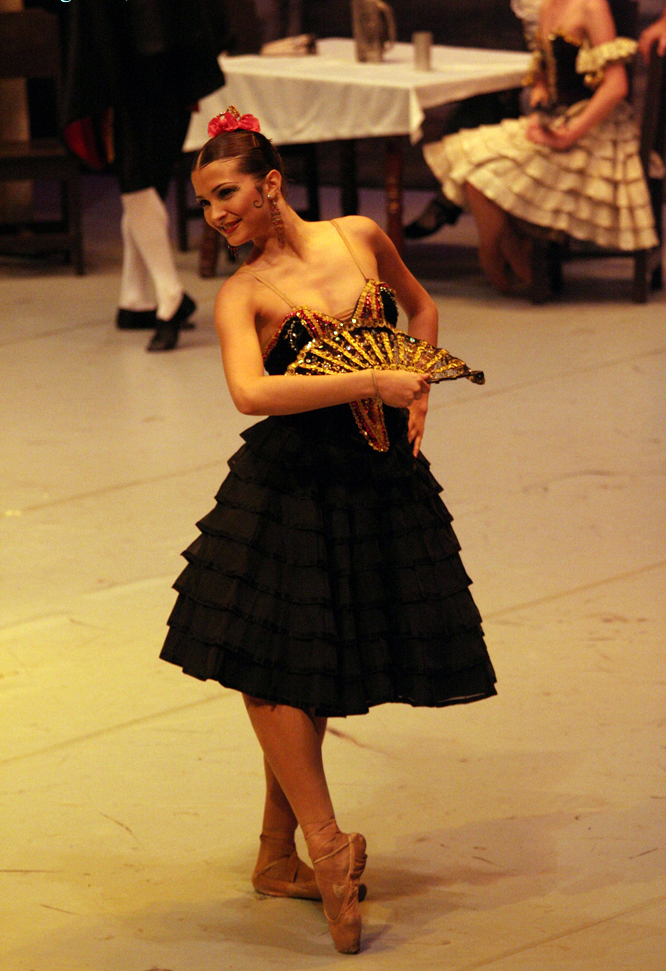
A scene from Don Quixote at the Theatre

The Rubén Darío National Theatre (Spanish: Teatro Nacional Rubén Darío) is the national theatre of Nicaragua and a major center of cultural life in Managua. Named in honor of one of Nicaragua's most renowned poets, Rubén Darío (1867-1916), the theatre hosts concerts, plays, and visual art exhibits.

The main auditorium seats up to 1,200 people, and there is also an experimental theatre with 230 seats. Another room, called The Crystal Room, has three chandeliers donated by Spain and views of Lake Managua.

== History ==
In the mid 1960s, the US socialite and future first lady of Nicaragua, Hope Portocarrero, championed the construction of a theatre that would be built in memory of the poet and "Father of Modernismo" Rubén Darío, on the 100-year anniversary of his birth. Portocarrero raised money for the project and oversaw its construction. The design was initially drawn up in 1963 by José Francisco Terán Callejas, who became the project's principal architect in 1966. The building was built at a cost of two million dollars and finally opened its doors in 1969. It has been called a "landmark of modern architecture in Central America and a model for architects the world over." In front of the theatre, in Ruben Darío park, there is a statue of Darío built in 1933; the figure of the poet is wearing a Roman toga and a garland of olive branches.

The National Theatre sustained very little damage after the devastating 1972 Managua earthquake, and it was one of the few major buildings in downtown Managua to survive.

== See also ==
- Culture of Nicaragua
