= Salvador Cardenal =

- Born: Salvador de Jesús Cardenal Barquero; October 6, 1960; Managua, Nicaragua
- Died: March 8, 2010 (aged 49) Managua, Nicaragua
- Occupations: Singer, poet, painter and ecologist
- Instrument: Guitar
- Years active: 1980-2010
- Formerly of: Duo Guardabarranco, Katia Cardenal

Salvador de Jesús Cardenal Barquero (Managua, Nicaragua, October 6, 1960 - March 8, 2010) was a Nicaraguan singer-songwriter and was one of the most renowned songwriters in Nicaragua and Central America, also a poet, painter and ecologist. Father of two children, Salvador Joaquín & Guillermo Nicolas.

== Early life ==
Salvador Cardenal was the second born of Leyla María Barquero and Salvador Cardenal Vargas, in a family of five children. His niece Nina and nephew Sebastian, are also musicians. He spent most of his childhood in Managua, Nicaragua, where he studied in the Colegio Centro América. When he was 17 he started playing the guitar he got as a present during his years studying to be a Jesuit Novice in Panamá. He left the convent for music and went back to Nicaragua during the Nicaraguan Revolution.

== Artistic career ==
In 1980, Salvador formed the Duo Guardabarranco with his sister, Katia Cardenal. Their music expressed the love for nature, freedom and justice. They toured over 30 countries in folk and political festivals. They published ten LP's during their years together, which became very successful and influential in their homeland. In 1990 they won second place in the OTI festival of 1990, with their song "Dame tu Corazón".

He also published two albums as a soloist, one which was live. Later in his career, he would tour Nicaragua with ecological concerts. His only solo studio album, Tuyo Lo Que Soy, is in the Latin folk tradition, and the songs, which have been praised for their "inspired lyricism" contain social and political themes.

During his lifetime Salvador Cardenal also dedicated much time to painting. He would mainly paint portraits of bodies, angels, butterflies and Jesus Christ, in vivid and distinct colours.

In November 2009, a benefit for Cardenal was held that included notable Nicaraguan singers including Carlos Mejía Godoy and Norma Helena Gadea.

== Final years ==
Salvador Cardenal died March 8, 2010, in the military hospital "Alejandro Dávila Bolaños" after being constantly hospitalized suffering from a rare disease called Cryoglobulinemia. According to a 2009 news article, when he was diagnosed with Cryoglobulinemia, he was only given up to 10 years of life (he was in his ninth at the time of his death). He was survived by his family including his two sons Salvador and Guillermo.

== Recognitions and legacy ==
In December 2009, he was honored with "la Orden Cultural Salvador Cardenal" by the City Council of Managua, an award named after Cardenal's grandfather Salvador Cardenal Argüello and awarded to distinguishable musicians. In May 2010, during Europe Day, the Nicaraguan representative for the European Union of Central America and Panama, Mendel Golstein, gave a tribute to Cardenal and featured a collaboration of the works by French artist Jean Marc Calvet and Cardenal.

In December 2011, a museum about Cardenal was nearly completed and was officially opened on March 8, 2012, the second anniversary of his death. In 2011, the city of Managua held a festival in his memory.
