= José de la Cruz Mena =

Nicaraguan composer (1874–1907)

José de la Cruz Mena (3 May 1874 – 22 September 1907) was a Nicaraguan composer. When he was twenty-one years old he contracted leprosy, but continued to compose until his death twelve years later. Mena is considered to have been one of the most prominent Nicaraguan composers of his time and one of the most important composers from that country.

== Biography ==
Mena was born in León, Nicaragua, on 3 May 1874, to a family which included a number of musicians. He attended the Escuela Nacional de Música in Managua as a child, and played trumpet in bands in the city, composing several famous waltzes. He fell ill with leprosy when he was twenty-one years old, but was not sent to the nation's leper colony after writing three items of music that he dedicated to José Santos Zelaya, the President of Nicaragua. He was completely blind after five years, by 1896, and rarely appeared in public due to his disease. Regardless, his entry in The New Grove Dictionary of Music and Musicians described Mena as "the pre-eminent Nicaraguan composer of his time". He died twelve years after contracting leprosy, near the Chiquito River in León, on 22 September 1907.

He is sometimes known as "the divine leper" and a theatre in León is named in his memory. Much of the music Mena composed was religious in nature, and while he composed numerous works, much of it is lost. In 2008 Mena was described in Culture and Customs of Nicaragua as one of the "four most important academic composers in the history of music in Nicaragua", in addition to Alejandro Vega Matus, Carlos Alberto Ramirez, and Luis Abraham Delgadillo. He has been cited as one of the most important composers in the country of his era, along with Matus.

== Bibliography ==
- White, Steven F.; Calderón, Esthela (2008). Culture and customs of Nicaragua. Westport, Conn. : Greenwood Press. ISBN 978-0-313-33994-3.
- Apel, Willi (1969). Harvard Dictionary of Music. Harvard University Press. ISBN 978-0-674-37501-7.
- The Garland encyclopedia of world music. New York : Garland Pub. 1998. ISBN 978-0-8240-6035-0.
