= Macolla =

Macolla is a Nicaraguan salsa band. From 1992 to 1996, the lead singers were Lya Barrioz, Raúl Navarro, Sergio Zepeda, y Harold Gutierrez. During this period Macolla recorded two CDs, Sueños (Dreams) and Bailarlo Contigo (Dance it with you, 1996), for Sony Music label. The band and Barrioz also made the first music video shot in film format in Nicaragua - "Sólo Soy".

Macolla was one of the most popular bands in Nicaragua in the 1990s. Their best-selling album Bailarlo Contigo (Sony, 1996) featured several songs in palo de mayo style showing the genre's creative development - including a remake of an old palo de mayo song but with English-Spanish chorus a Spanish rap section. A medley "Homenaje a La Música Latina" has featured on several Rough Guide compilations including The Rough Guide To Salsa, and Rough Guide To World Music for Children.

== Discography ==
Bailarlo Contigo (Sony, 1996)

1. Machaina, written D.A.R. (cover of "Oh Madiana" -Kassav Band)
2. Anancy Oh
3. Do Me Amas D.A.R.
4. El Que No Corre Vuela Manuel Jimenez
5. Nos Quedamos Tu y Yo Jorge Luís Piloto
6. Bailarlo Contigo Traditional
7. Esclavo de Amor Rey Sanchez
8. Será Que Ya No Puedo Olvidarte Rudy Pérez
9. Esa Mujer
10. Ma' Yo Bailo
