= Luis Abraham Delgadillo =

Nicaraguan composer (1887–1961)

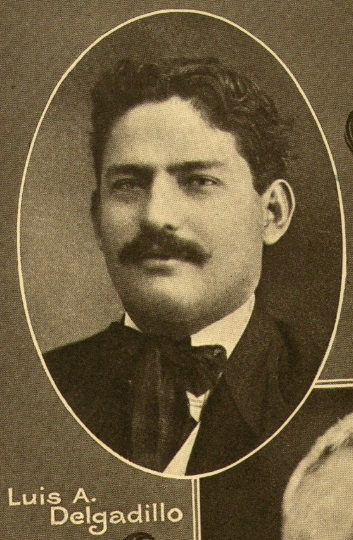
Delgadillo

Luis Abraham Delgadillo (August 25, 1887 – December 20, 1961) was a Nicaraguan composer. He was director-general of musical culture for Nicaragua and later led the National School of Music in Managua and the National Symphony Orchestra.

== Biography ==
Luis Abraham Delgadillo was born on August 26, 1887, in Managua, the capital of Nicaragua, where he was first educated. He then studied music at the Milan Conservatory in Italy at the initiative of the Nicaraguan government, for five years. Upon his return to Nicaragua, Delgadillo took conductorship of the Banda de los Supremos Poderes (Band of the Supremos Poderes). He was also made the first director-general of musical culture—the position having been created specifically for him. From 1921 to 1925 he lived in Mexico City where he taught music theory at the Conservatorio Nacional de Música. Delgadillo conducted at Carnegie Hall in New York City in 1930. He was in New York when the 1931 Nicaragua earthquake occurred, composing Romance Oriental (Eastern Romance) in response. He taught composition in Panama City for two years beginning in 1943, simultaneously editing the journal Armonía. Delgadillo founded Nicaragua's National School of Music and a symphony orchestra. He directed both of these organizations beginning in 1950.

He died on December 20, 1961, in Managua.

== Work and legacy ==
Delgadillo composed over 400 works of music, including nine "major orchestral works"; Final de Norma, an opera; and over sixty works for the piano, twenty-four of which were dedicated to Frédéric Chopin. Much of his work was inspired by native music of Nicaragua and Guatemala, and Delgadillo may have been the first composer to research Nicaraguan folk music.

In 2008 Delgadillo was described in Culture and Customs of Nicaragua as one of the "four most important academic composers in the history of music in Nicaragua", in addition to Alejandro Vega Matus, Carlos Alberto Ramirez, and José de la Cruz Mena. The New Grove Dictionary of Music and Musicians says that he "was the first Nicaraguan to write large orchestral works and remains the Nicaraguan classical composer with the greatest exposure on the American continent." The Harvard Dictionary of Music describes Delgadillo as "the foremost figure in Nicaraguan music."

== Bibliography ==
- Apel, Paul Hermann (1958). Music of the Americas, North and South. The Archive of Contemporary Music. New York, Vantage Press.
- White, Steven F.; Calderón, Esthela (2008). Culture and customs of Nicaragua. Westport, Conn. : Greenwood Press. ISBN 978-0-313-33994-3.
- Ficher, Miguel (2002). Latin American classical composers : a biographical dictionary. Lanham, Md. : Scarecrow Press. ISBN 978-0-8108-4517-6.
- Gordillo Brockmann, Bernard (2020). "The Raja's Nicaraguan Dream: Exoticism, Commemoration, and Nostalgia in Luis A. Delgadillo's "Romance Oriental"". Diagonal: An Ibero-American Music Review. 5 (1). doi:10.5070/D85147245. ISSN 2470-4199.
- Madrid, Alejandro L. (2015). In Search of Julián Carrillo and Sonido 13. Oxford University Press. ISBN 978-0-19-021578-1.
- Apel, Willi (1969). Harvard Dictionary of Music. Harvard University Press. ISBN 978-0-674-37501-7.
