= Carlos Mejía Godoy =

Nicaraguan musician

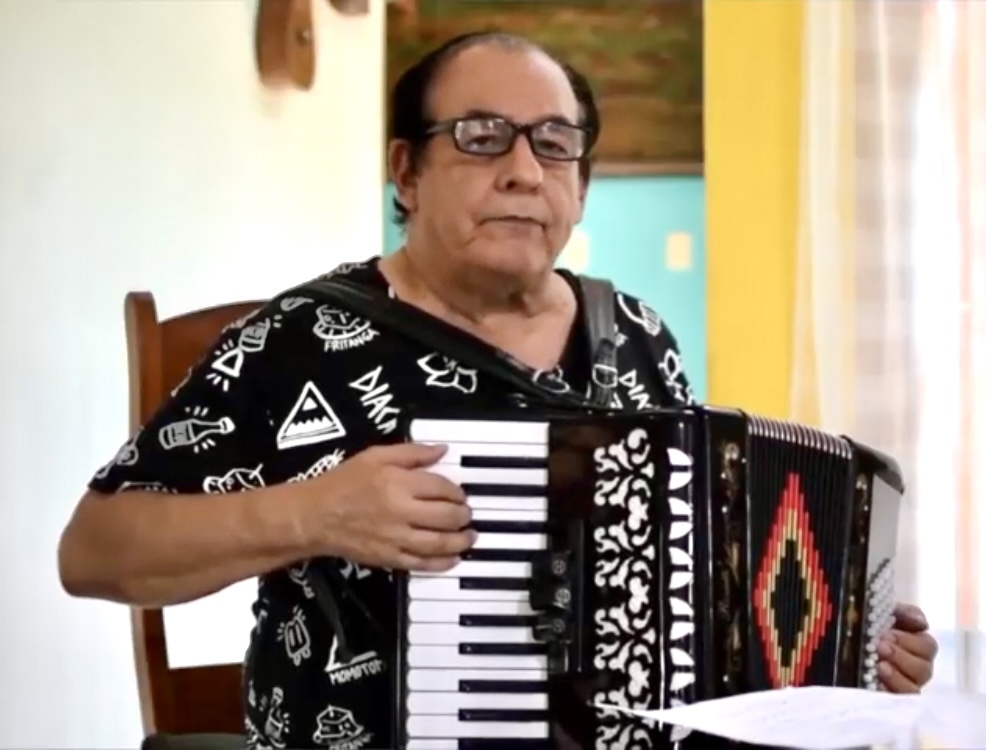
- Carlos Mejía Godoy in 2019.
- Born: Carlos Mejía Godoy; June 27, 1943 (age 83); Somoto, Madriz, Nicaragua
- Occupations: Singer-songwriter; musician; composer

Carlos Mejía Godoy (born June 27, 1943) is a Nicaraguan musician, composer and singer-songwriter and one of the main representatives of the testimonial song or new song of his country.

He grew up in a family related to popular music, folklore and traditional culture, which gave him a very early relationship with the cultural and artistic world of Nicaragua. He had a close friendship with the guitarist of the Camerata Bach and Los de Palacagüina, Pedro Miranda, and with the Nicaraguan musician Silvio Linarte.

Carlos and his brother Luis Enrique were pivotal in the nueva canción (new song) movement in Central America beginning in the 1970s. They were both honored with Nicaragua's highest cultural distinction, the Order of Rubén Darío.

He actively participated in the Sandinista Revolution, composing a good part of the songs associated with it and spreading the cause of the fight against the dictatorship of Anastasio Somoza Debayle throughout the world. After the revolutionary triumph, he was one of the main cultural promoters of the Sandinista governments. After the loss of power of the FSLN in the 1990 elections, he left the FSLN and gradually became politically distant from this party and the leadership exercised by Daniel Ortega, becoming an active participant in the 2018 protests.

== Early life and career ==
Carlos Mejía Godoy was born in Somoto, Madriz on June 27, 1943. He was the son of Carlos Mejía Fajardo, a popular musician, and María Elsa Godoy, a school teacher and bread maker. His brother Luis Enrique Mejía Godoy, two years his junior, is also a Nicaraguan musician.

In 1954, he left his hometown and continued his elementary and high school studies until starting university in the 1960s, where he began to collaborate as a radio host, actor, and script writer. His relationship with the radio would continue into the 1970s, standing out as an actor and creator of satirical radio programs. It was at this time that he came to develop his first musical works.

In that period he began to stand out with his work "Alforja Campesina" which was performed by the trio "Los Madrigales". Together with the trio "Los Bisturices Armónicos" he is dedicated to the investigation and study of Nicaraguan folklore, collecting and disseminating old peasant songs. The songs of social content for which he noted his sympathy for the revolutionary movement of Sandinista National Liberation Front and his integration into the student movement at the university are from those years. Songs like "Yo no puedo callar", "Desde Siuna con amor", "Muchacha del F.S.L.N." or "The grave of the guerrilla" are from that time.

At the end of the 1960s, incorporated into Radio Corporación de Managua, he created the character "Corporito", which, as he himself admits, allowed him to discover himself as a communicator, as he described it in 1993:

He sang a parody every day, changing the lyrics to well-known songs and adapting it to some political and social problem.

After the 1972 earthquake, he founded the "Taller de Sonido Popular" together with Humberto Quintanilla, Milcíades Poveda Herrera, Enrique Duarte, Silvio Linarte and Pablo Martínez Téllez (El Guadalupano) and joined the group "Gradas". As a member of the "National Song Salvation Brigade" he followed the path of rescuing many Nicaraguan folkloric pieces.

== Music career ==
Many of his songs, performed with his band los de Palacagüina, became associated with the Sandinista movement as songs of the workers and revolutionaries. He even composed a Mass for the working class, the Misa Campesina Nicaragüense. Many of his songs during the late 1970s gave instructions on how to use, assemble, and disassemble the rifles people were capturing from dictator Somoza's National Guard during street battles.

One of his biggest achievements of his career as a songwriter came in 1977 when the song Quincho Barrilete (Quincho, the boy of the little barrel), composed by himself and performed by Eduardo Gonzalez won the sixth edition of the OTI Festival. A victory which is still remembered by many Nicaraguans.

In 1980, Carlos Mejía Godoy y los de Palancagüina were internally selected by Televicentro Nicaragua to represent their country in the OTI Festival in 1980 with their song La chavalita de España (The little girl from Spain). This song marked the return of Nicaragua to the event after two years of absence because of the turbulent Nicaraguan Revolution. Their competing song, which although was one of the favorites, ended in a respectable but disappointing tenth place with 15 points.

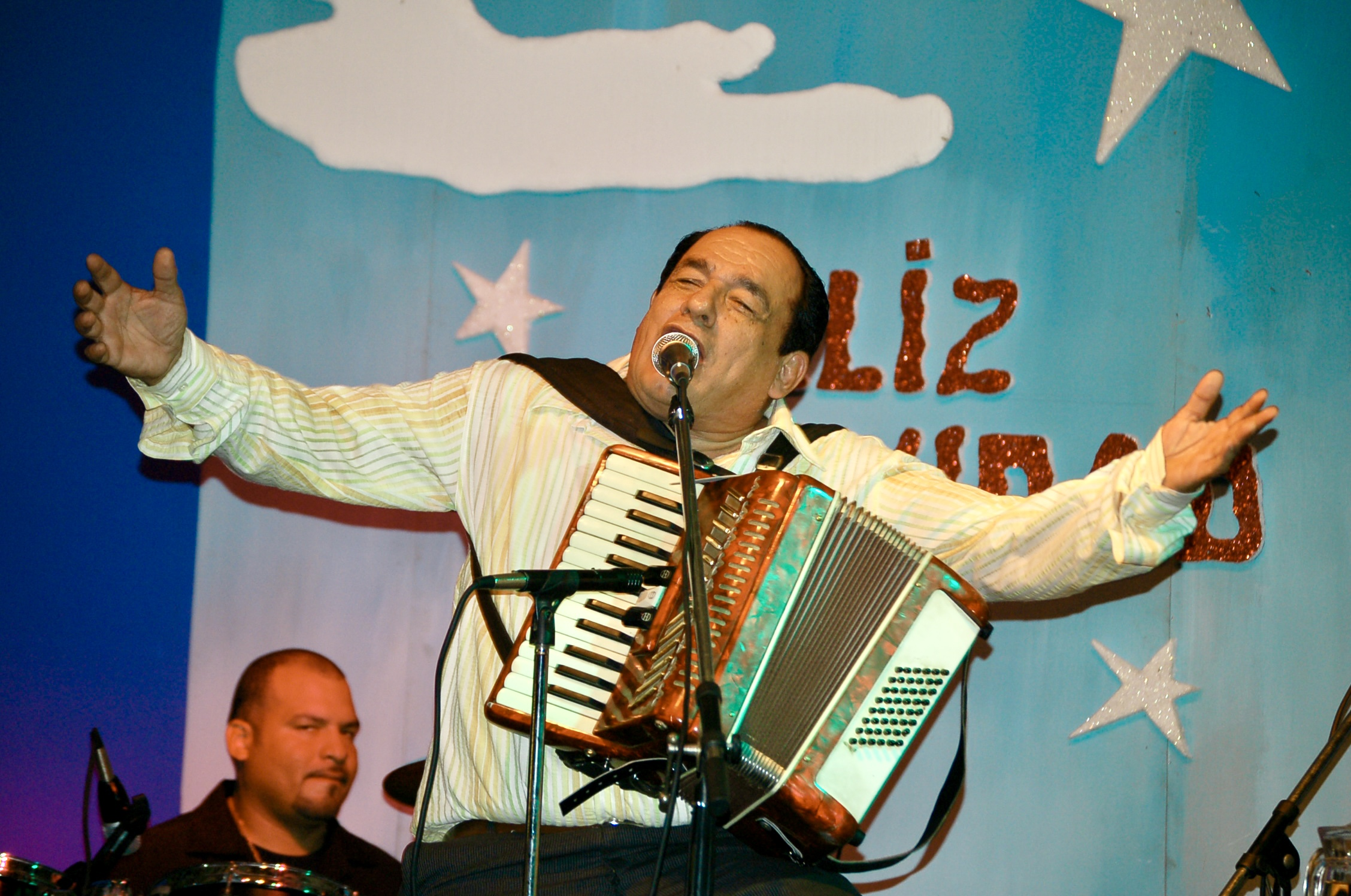
Carlos Mejía Godoy performing in 2006.

He was the vice-presidential running mate of Edmundo Jarquín of the Sandinista Renovation Movement (MRS) in the November 2006 presidential election. They came in fourth place.

In February 2021, Mejía Godoy condemned a proposed law that would declare the songs of the Nicaraguan National Guard, as Heritage of the Nation, considering it confiscatory of his work.

== Awards and Accolades ==
| Year | Award |
|---|---|
| 2016 | Latin Grammy Trustee Award |
| 1989 | Order of Ruben Dario Award |
| 1977 | OTI Festival Winner |

== Family and personal life ==
Mejía Godoy is the father of the United States Army conscientious objector, author, and anti-war activist Camilo Mejía, as well as the musicians Carlos Luis 'La Bujilla' Mejía and Augusto 'El Negro' Mejía from the Grammy-nominated Nicaraguan ensemble La Cuneta Son Machín.

As one of president Daniel Ortega's fiercest critics, he fears being killed. He lived in Costa Rica from 2018-2020. Since 2020 he has lived in Santa Rosa, California.

Mejia Godoy is married to Xochitl Jimenez.

== Discography ==
Albums

Some of his albums include: El Son Nuestro De Cada Día, La Nueva Milpa, Grandes Éxitos, and A Dos Puyas, No Hay Toro Valiente.

Contributing artist

His music has been featured on several compilations of songs of Nicaragua and the Nicaraguan revolution: Songs of the Nicaraguan Revolution, Vol.1-2, and Nicaraguita: Music from Nicaragua. He was also featured in The Rough Guide to the Music of Central America (2002, World Music Network). Mejía Godoy was featured on the title track from La Cuneta Son Machín's Cañambuco (2017, Round Whirled Records).

Jefferson Starship recorded one of his songs for their 2008 album Jefferson's Tree of Liberty
