= Dimension Costeña =

Nicaraguan musical group

Dimensión Costeña is a Nicaraguan musical group that came together in the Caribbean coast of the country in Bluefields.

== History ==
The group has been together for 32 years and in that time they have produced 17 LPs and 13 CDs.

The band have performed in many places through the world: from Managua to Los Angeles, from Miami to Europe.

== Band members ==
Dimension Costena consists of eight members, all of whom are from the coast area.

The main band member is called Luis Cassells, who dubs himself as the "Director Artistico" or the Artistic Director. Anthony Mathews and Anthony De Costena on vocals.

== See also ==
- Music of Nicaragua
- Culture of Nicaragua
