= Hernaldo Zúñiga =

Nicaraguan singer-songwriter

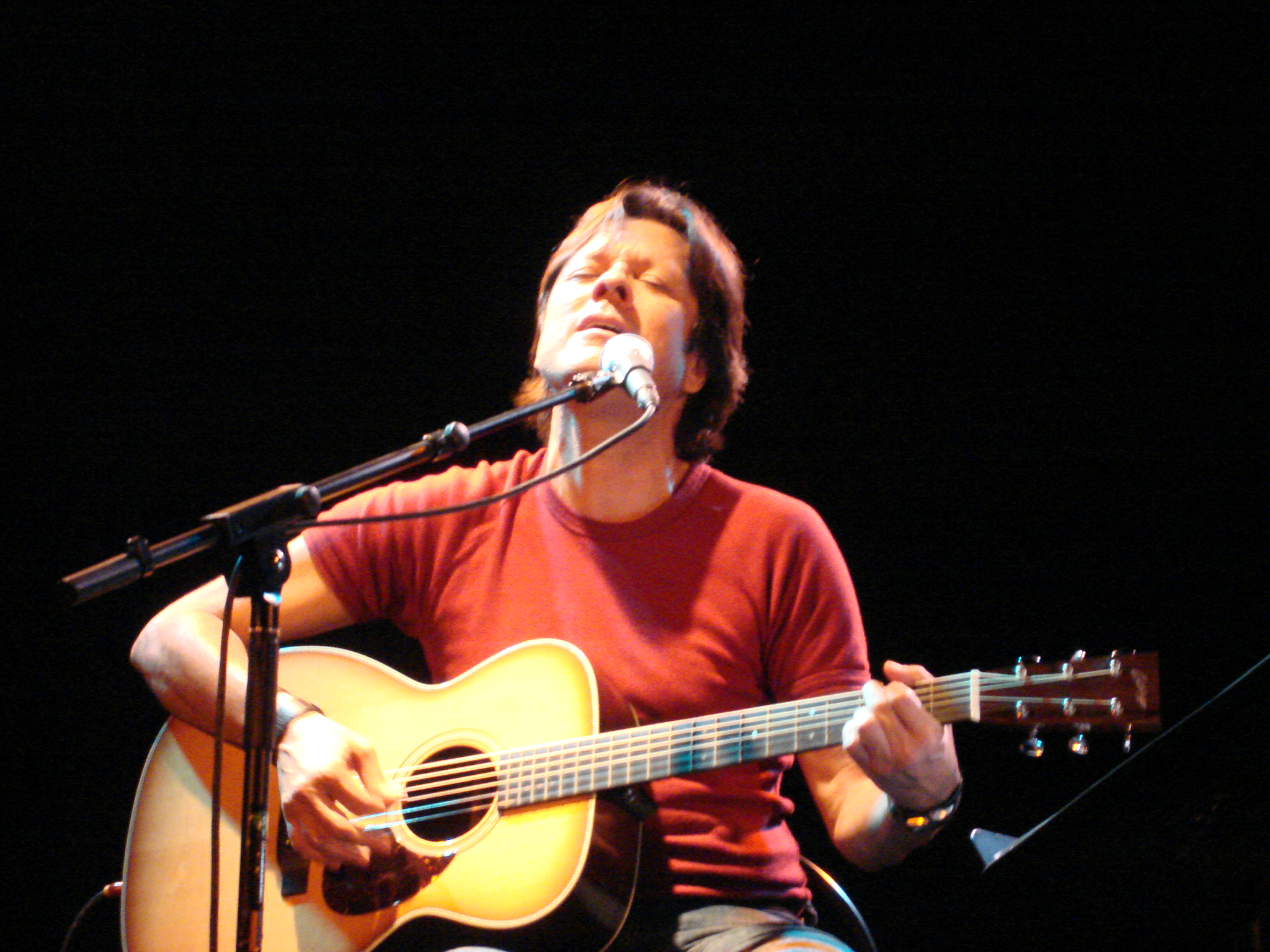
- Hernaldo Zúñiga

Background information
- Born: Hernaldo Zúñiga Gutiérrez; June 2, 1955 (age 71); Masaya, Nicaragua
- Genres: Trova
- Occupations: Singer-songwriter, musician, producer
- Instruments: Voice, guitar
- Years active: 1972–present
- Labels: Zafiro; EMI Music Mexico; Warner Music Mexico; Universal Music Mexico; Zungu Music (current)

Hernaldo Zúñiga (born June 2, 1955) is a Nicaraguan singer-songwriter. He was born in Managua, but spent his childhood and adolescence in Masaya.

== Career ==
While he was studying in Chile, in 1973, Zúñiga recorded his first 45 rpm single with "Producciones Caracol", including as one side the David Gates' song "Everything I Own".

At 17, during his first year of law school, he composed his first song, "Ventanillas" ("Little Windows"). In February 1974, he performed in the XV Festival Internacional de la Canción de Viña del Mar.

In October of that year, he obtained seventh place in the third edition of the OTI Festival, celebrated in Acapulco, Mexico, singing the song "Gaviota" ("Seagull"), which meant the first participation of Nicaragua in this Festival.

The same year, he recorded his first album: "Del arco iris, una canción" ("A Song from the Rainbow").

In 1977 Zúñiga took part in XVIII Festival Internacional de la Canción de Viña del Mar, obtaining second place for Nicaragua with the song "Cancionero" ("Song Book").

In 1978 Zúñiga released Cancionero (Song Book), professionally starting his musical career. The production was directed by Juan Carlos Calderón.

Between December 1979 and January 1980, Zúñiga recorded a new work by the hand of the Spanish singer-songwriter Manuel Alejandro. The songs included "Procuro olvidarte" ("Trying to forget you"), "Ven con el alma desnuda" ("Come as you are"), "Un pasajero" ("A Passenger"), "Insoportablemente bella" ("Unbearably Beautiful") or "Ese beso que me has dado" ("That Kiss that You Have Given Me").

In 1982 Zúñiga recorded the album A tanto fuego (On So Much Fire) in London, Germany and Madrid.

In 1986, he released "¿Cómo te va mi amor?" ("How is it going, baby?"). Manuel Mijares also turns into success the Hernaldo's composition "Siempre" (Always). Angela Carrasco, Jeannette, Sergio and Estíbaliz and Yuri (Mexican singer) between others, endorses success of his compositions.

At this time Zúñiga took a sabbatical, and broke ties with the Zafiro record label.

Two years later, already residing in Mexico, he released the album Qué increíble es la distancia (Distance is so incredible), which included the songs "Mira arriba" ("Look Up"), "Una vez al mes" ("Once A Month"), "Tengo unos celos que matan" ("I feel so terribly jealous", "Te llevaré" ("I Will Take You with Me").

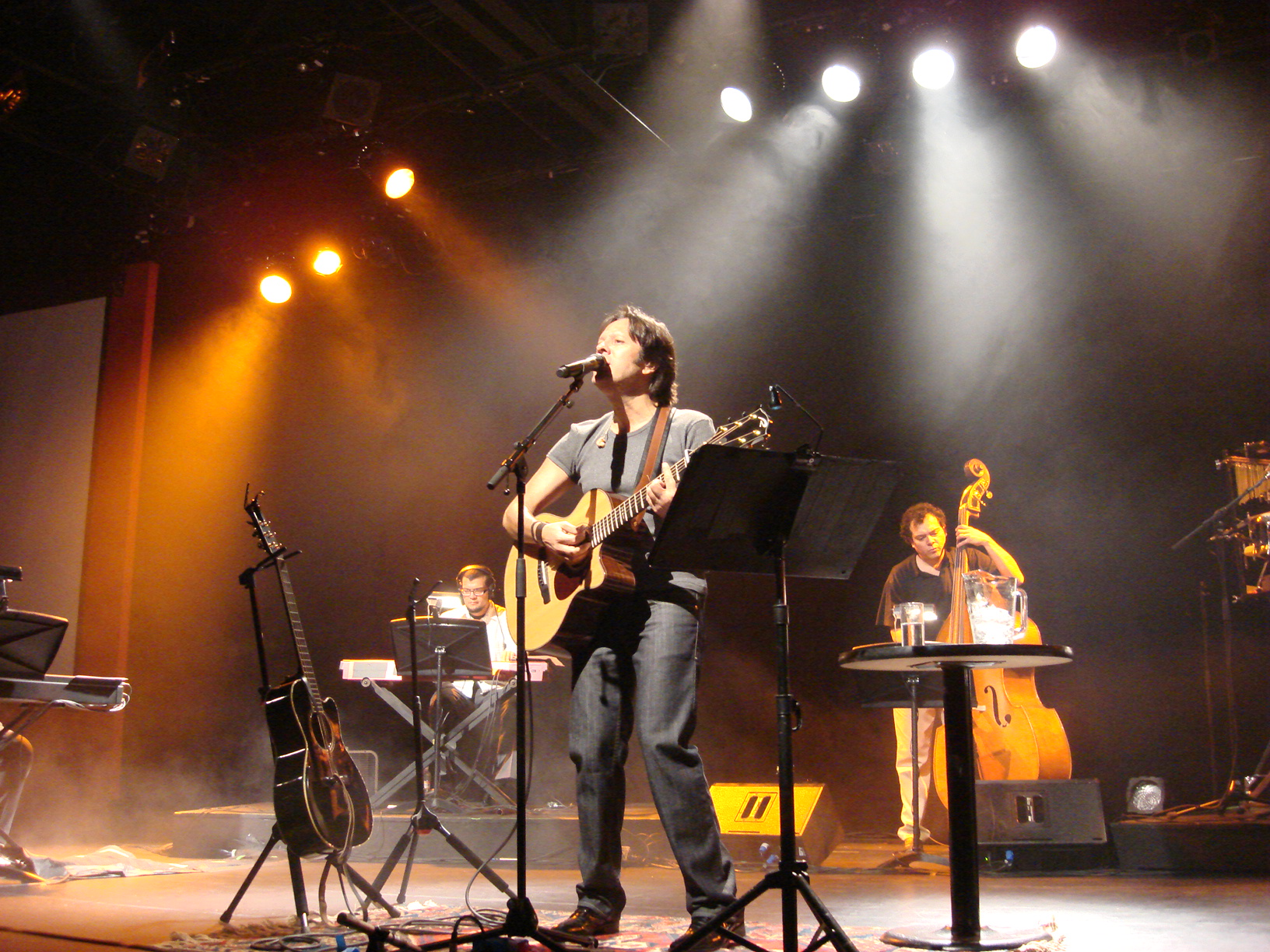
Hernaldo Zúñiga in concert

As of 1992, Zúñiga produces, prepares arrangements and composed "Después de todos estos años" (After All These Years).

In London and with the help of Chucho Merchán, he records "No tengo más patria que tu corazón" ("I Have no more Homeland than your Heart"), "¿Adónde?" ("Where?"), "Al otro lado del mundo" ("At the Other Side of the World") and "Eres todo menos azar" ("You are Everything but chance").

Zúñiga signed an exclusive contract with Universal Music Mexico. "Triángulo de musgo" ("Moss Triangle") is the title of the album that initiates his journey in his new record house. The production, arrangements and the songs were Zúñiga's responsibility; the album was recorded in London, Madrid and Los Angeles.

His production "Nómada" ("Nomad") was released in May 2007.

Zúñiga has his own record label, Zungu Music.

== Main discography ==
- Del Arco Iris, Una Canción (From the rainbow, a song) (1974)
- Cancionero (Song book) (1978)
- Hernaldo, El Original (Hernaldo, The original) (1980)
- A Tanto Fuego (On so much fire) (1982)
- Siglo XX (20th Century) (1984)
- Qué Increíble es la Distancia (How incredible is the distance) (1988)
- Después de Todos Estos Años (After all these years) (1992)
- Triángulo de Musgo (Triangle of moss) (2001)
- Nómada (Nomad) (2007)

== Live albums ==
- Básico D.F. (Basic D.F.) (1996)
- Ciudad Acústica (Acoustic city) (2002)

== Compilations ==
- Los Grandes Éxitos de... Hernaldo (Greatest hits of... Hernaldo) (1999)
- Grandes Éxitos (Greatest hits) (2001)
- El Origen (The origin) (2001) (Special edition for Nicaragua)
- Mi Historia (My history) (2002)

== Collaborations ==
- Eterna Navidad (Eternal Christmas) (1986), as part of "La Hermandad" (The Brotherhood) in a Christmas special along with: Tatiana, Manuel Mijares, Daniela Romo, Arianna, Pandora, Denise De Kalafe, Óscar Athie y Yuri.
- Diciembre 25 (December 25) (1991), Christmas special produced by Hernaldo Zúñiga, this album included the voices of singers such as Alejandra Ávalos, Fher (from [[Maná {group}|Mana]]), Ilse, Benny, Ivonne and Ivette, El Tri, Alissa, Ángel, Café Tacuba, Laura Flores, Zúñiga, Denise of Kalafe, Luis Gatica and Los Joao. Hernaldo sang "Estrella Blanca" with Laura Flores ("White Star", a Cat Stevens' "Morning Has Broken" cover, adapted by Hernaldo for a beautiful Christmas carol) and "Diciembre 25" (December 25) along with: Ángel, Ilse, Benny, Laura Flores, Alejandra Ávalos, Luis Gatica, Ivonne and Ivette, Denise de Kalafe and Alissa.

== Songs composed for other artists ==
Artista	Canciones
Pandora	¿Cómo Te Va Mi Amor? Sólo Él Y Yo; Todavía; Amor, Amor; Abusas De Mí; Alguien Llena Mi Lugar; No Me Queda Nada
Manuel Mijares	Siempre; Al Caminar; Volveré A Nacer; Montón De Verano; Desnuda (F.Migliacci-F. Marcheli-Adapt. Hernaldo Zúñiga)
Yuri	Perdona; Si Te Pierdo; No Habrá
Ángela Carrasco	El Tiempo Nos Pesa
Sergio y Estíbaliz	Te Quiero Y Ya
Jeanette	¿Qué Puedo Hacer? (1984)
Franco	Preguntándome
Fernanda	Era Mejor
Sonia Rivas	Ayer Sin Conversar (Otra Oportunidad); De Pecho A Pecho (1987)
Dumas	Se Ha Terminado
Los Dandys	Volverás Por Mí
Charlie Massó	Hemos Madurado
Gloria y Noemí Gil	Es Tan Difícil Quererte
Fandango	Dame Aquel Martillo (Lee Hays-Pete Seeger-Adapt. Hernaldo Zúñiga)
Maribel Guardia	De Pecho A Pecho (2008)
Hernán Visetti	Flor De Temporada; Te Haré El Amor
Rocío Banquells	Mineral
Valeria Lynch	Límite
Arianna	¿Qué Puedo Hacer? (1985)
Jazmine Athie	Mucha Dulzura
Mario Castelli	Tengo Que Amarte Amor
