= Palo de Mayo =

Afro-Caribbean dance

Palo de Mayo (English: Maypole; or ¡M ayo Ya!) is a type of Afro-Caribbean dance with sensual movements that forms part of the culture of several communities in the RAAS region in Nicaragua, as well as Belize, the Bay Islands of Honduras and Bocas del Toro in Panama. It is also the name given to the month-long May Day festival celebrated on the Caribbean coast. Both the festival and dance are an Afro-Nicaraguan tradition which originated in Bluefields, Nicaragua in the 17th century.

== History ==
Palo de Mayo, or Maypole, is a celebration welcoming rain, production, and new life that includes a maypole, which is a tall wooden pole, decorated with several long, colored ribbons suspended from the top. There is no definite answer as to how it got to Nicaragua. Historians continue to debate its origins. Bluefields people pretty much all agree, "May Pole is not what it used to be." An elegant polka in which smartly dressed women held hands and two-slapped around a fruit laden tree.

It was probably brought to Nicaragua in the early 1830s by British settlers and the ribbon pole dance common to England was modified, according to speculations, incorporating elements of Shango, a West African religion, featuring spirit possession. Certainly already in 1874, Moravian missionary J.E. Lundberg wrote: "It is now generally conducted at night, by moonlight, amidst a heathenish noise and it has become connected with great impropriety of conduct." Professor Hugo Sujo says the rituals varied. Children would adorn branches with mangoes, pineapples and breadfruit; dance in a circle and then plunder the tree.

Many historians point out that there are many differences in the celebration and that it came from the Nicaraguan Creoles that inhabited Nicaragua's Caribbean coast, while other historians believe it came indirectly from Jamaica. Wherever it came from, it has long been a part of Nicaragua's Afro-Caribbean culture. In Belize, plaiting of the maypole along with coconut tree climbing and greasy pole competitions. This is because most of the Creole population of the RAAS region in Nicaragua, moved to British Honduras (later to become Belize) after British secession of the region in 1787.

The Sandinisitas promoted the event as a tourist attraction supporting local bands and dance groups, under Miss Lizzie's leadership. Miss Lizzie involved 70-year-old women to dance the old style, to teach the youth the real thing. But by 1993 she'd lost ground to the new style of May Pole which was seen by older traditional dancers as "a dirty display of dirty dancing".

=== Palo de Mayo music and dance ===
The only difference in the Palo de Mayo of RAAS region in Nicaragua from Belize, and the Bay Islands of Honduras, is the dance originated during a festival in which the women danced around the maypole and then had 2 men approach them in hopes of accompanying them but the women rejected them with their hands telling them no. The music is sensual with intense rhythms and originated during the same time as the dance. As the years have progressed, the dance accompanying Palo de Mayo music has become more and more sensual.

During the dance, custom made music was being played and that type of music is now referred to as a genre called Palo de Mayo. Palo de Mayo music is an electric reworking of Creole acoustic folk music called a mento. Palo de Mayo music retains a lot of the mento style including lyrics, melodies, and choral patterns, but speeds up the tempo and replaces different instruments.

=== Palo de Mayo Instruments ===
Historically, Combos played bongo drums made of tree trunks, washboard bass and even the jawbone of a donkey for percussion. Later calypso, soa or soul calypso and other influences were incorporated into the music. Instruments in a Palo de Mayo Ensemble include tap drums, horn sections, electric guitar, electric bass, and portable electric organ .

=== Palo de Mayo musicians ===
Tanto (Silvester Hodgson), a Beholden barrio character who never wore shoes and started making up a new May Pole song every year.

The most famous spot for the May Pole Celebration was a place called Long Field.

Dimension Costena is a famous Palo de Mayo band that was very popular throughout Western Nicaragua in the 1980s.
