= Netherlands Antilles in the OTI Festival 1992 =

- OTI Festival 1992
- Participating broadcaster: Antilliaanse Televisie Maatschappij (ATM)
- Country: Netherlands Antilles
- Selection process: Antillean OTI Festival
- Selection date: 28 October 1992

Competing entry
- Song: "Vivencias"
- Artist: Humberto Nivi
- Songwriters: Humberto Nivi; Lito Scarso

Placement
- Final result: Finalist

Participation chronology
◄1990 •	1992	• 1993►

The Netherlands Antilles was represented at the OTI Festival 1992 with the song "Vivencias", written by Humberto Nivi and Lito Scarso, and performed by Nivi himself. The Netherlands Antillean participating broadcaster, Antilliaanse Televisie Maatschappij (ATM), selected its entry through a televised national final. The song, that was performed in position 12, was not among the top-three places revealed. Humberto Nivi had already represented the Netherlands Antilles in 1974.

== National stage ==
Antilliaanse Televisie Maatschappij (ATM), held a national final to select its entry for the 21st edition of the OTI Festival. ATM returned to participate in the festival, after having been absent from the previous festival.

=== National final ===
ATM held the national final on Wednesday 28 October 1992, beginning at 20:40 AST (00:40+1 UTC), at the Centro Pro Arte in Willemstad. It was presented by Nathalie Petronia-Doran and Morgan Isenia, and broadcast live on TeleCuraçao.

The winner was "Vivencias", written by Humberto Nivi and Lito Scarso, and performed by Nivi himself.

Winner

Result of the Antillean OTI Festival 1992 (Note: Incomplete list of the competing entries.)
R/O	Song	Artist	Result
	"Vivencias"	Humberto Nivi	1

== At the OTI Festival ==
On 5 December 1992, the OTI Festival was held at Teatro Principal in Valencia, Spain, hosted by Televisión Española (TVE), and broadcast live throughout Ibero-America. Humberto Nivi performed "Vivencias" in position 12. The song was not among the top-three places revealed.

The festival was broadcast on delay at 20:30 AST (00:30+1 UTC) on TeleCuraçao.
