= Chile in the OTI Festival 1992 =

- OTI Festival 1992
- Participating broadcasters: Televisión Nacional de Chile (TVN); Corporación de Televisión de la Universidad Católica de Chile (UCTV); Red de Televisión de la Universidad de Chile (RTU); Compañía Chilena de Televisión (CCT); Red Televisiva Megavisión
- Country: Chile
- Selection process: National final
- Selection date: 19 October 1992

Competing entry
- Song: "Te prometo"
- Artist: Pablo Herrera
- Songwriters: Pablo Herrera; Alejandra Silva

Placement
- Final result: 3rd

Participation chronology
◄1991 •	1992	• 1993►

Chile was represented at the OTI Festival 1992 with the song "Te prometo", written by Pablo Herrera and Alejandra Silva, and performed by Herrera himself. The Chilean participating broadcasters, Televisión Nacional de Chile (TVN), Corporación de Televisión de la Universidad Católica de Chile (UCTV), Red de Televisión de la Universidad de Chile (RTU), Compañía Chilena de Televisión (CCT), and Red Televisiva Megavisión, selected their entry through a national televised final. The song, that was performed in position 14, placed third out of 25 competing entries.

== National stage ==
Televisión Nacional de Chile (TVN), Corporación de Televisión de la Universidad Católica de Chile (UCTV), Red de Televisión de la Universidad de Chile (RTU), Compañía Chilena de Televisión (CCT), and Red Televisiva Megavisión, selected their entry for the 21st edition of the OTI Festival through an eight-song national televised final staged and broadcast by TVN. The show was presented by Antonio Vodanovic, Iván Valenzuela, Diana Massis, and Gonzalo Saavedra. Before the national final, the songs were presented in the TVN's show Ene TV, hosted by Katherine Salosny.

Competing entries on the national final – Chile 1992
Song	Artist	Songwriter(s)
"Depende de ti"	Claudia Muñoz	Alejandro Gaete
"Disco para el corazón"	Solange	Juan Luis Fissore
"Fábula de amor"	Síndrome	Síndrome
"Necesito tu amor"	José Luis Arce	Reynaldo Tomás Martínez
"Te prometo"	Pablo Herrera	Pablo Herrera; Alejandra Silva
"Última canción de amor"	Sofía Abarca	Sofía Abarca; Francesca Marconi
"Y después"	Héctor Molina	Agustín Moncada
"Yo mismo, tú mismo"	Felipe Casas	Felipe Casas; Roberto Lizarbaur

=== National final ===
The national final was held on Monday 19 October 1992, beginning at 21:30 CLT (01:30+1 UTC). The show featured guest performances by Latoya Jackson and Jorge Navarrete.

The winner was "Te prometo", written by Pablo Herrera and Alejandra Silva, and performed by Herrera himself.

Winner

Result of the national final – Chile 1992
R/O	Song	Artist	Result
	"Depende de ti"	Claudia Muñoz	
	"Disco para el corazón"	Solange	
	"Fábula de amor"	Síndrome	
	"Necesito tu amor"	José Luis Arce	
	"Te prometo"	Pablo Herrera	1
	"Última canción de amor"	Sofía Abarca	
	"Y después"	Héctor Molina	
	"Yo mismo, tú mismo"	Felipe Casas	

== At the OTI Festival ==
On 5 December 1992, the OTI Festival was held at Teatro Principal in Valencia, Spain, hosted by Televisión Española (TVE), and broadcast live throughout Ibero-America. Pablo Herrera performed "Te prometo" in position 14, placing third, out of 25 competing entries.
