= Cuba in the OTI Festival 1991 =

- OTI Festival 1991
- Participating broadcaster: Cuban Institute of Radio and Television (ICRT)
- Country: Cuba
- Selection process: OTI 91, de La Habana a Acapulco
- Selection date: 22 September 1991

Competing entry
- Song: "Si todos saben de ti"
- Artist: Delia Díaz de Villegas
- Songwriter: Rolando Ojeda

Placement
- Semi-final result: Qualified
- Final result: Finalist

Participation chronology
1991	• 1992►

Cuba was represented at the OTI Festival 1991 with the song "Si todos saben de ti", written by Rolando Ojeda, and performed by Delia Díaz de Villegas. The Cuban participating broadcaster, the Cuban Institute of Radio and Television (ICRT), selected its entry through a national televised competition. The song, qualified from the semi-final, was one of the finalists.

== National stage ==
The Cuban Institute of Radio and Television (ICRT) held a national televised competition to select its debut entry for the 20th edition of the OTI Festival. This first edition of the national OTI festival, titled OTI 91, de La Habana a Acapulco, featured twenty-four songs in a semi-final, of which eight qualified for the final.

The shows were staged at ICRT's studio 19 in the FOCSA Building in Havana, were presented by Mirtha Medina and Carlos Otero, and were broadcast live on Cubavisión. Between 6 July and 7 September, the competing entries had been gradually presented in the weekly show Sábado conmigo, and the performances recorded there had been rebroadcast daily in prime time on Cubavisión.

The jury was composed of Amaury Pérez Vidal, Enrique Pineda Barnet, Enriqueta Almanza, Juan Formell, Miguel Patterson, Eugenio Pedraza Ginori, and Soledad Delgado. Each juror scored between 1 and 10 points each of the entries, considering various aspects of the song and the performer.

Competing entries on OTI 91, de La Habana a Acapulco
Song	Artist	Songwriter(s)
"Acorralada"	Tanya Rodríguez	Tanya Rodríguez
"Alas"	Ana María Perera	Lázaro García
"Algunas preguntas y un deseo"	Alexis Morejón	Rafael Guedes
"Atada a ti"	Marta Rosa	Ivette Pacheco
"Con la ternura de tu voz"	Ovidio González	Sergio Farías
"Guitarra que ha dejado de sonar"	Issac Delgado	José Valladares
"Invasión nocturna"	Ángel Bonne	Ángel Bonne
"Juego de complicidad"	Evelyn García Márquez	Evelyn García Márquez
"La número cien"	Tony Calá	Giraldo Piloto
"Luz de fe"	Ángel Quintero	Ángel Quintero
"Qué hago contigo, qué hago conmigo"	Lourdes Libertad	Lourdes Torres
"Quiero algo más"	Marusha	Vicente Rojas
"Razones para despertar"	Augusto Enríquez	Augusto Enríquez; Isel Rasuá; Julián Fernández
"Salgo a la calle"	Malena Burke	Demetrio Muñiz
"Salva este amanecer"	Alexis Valdés	Alexis Valdés
"Si no tuviera el corazón que tengo"	Ramón Fabián Veloz	Dimas Juantorena; Alberto Pujol
"Si todos saben de ti"	Delia Díaz de Villegas	Rolando Ojeda "Ojedita"
"Si tuviera que dejar de ser"	Raquel Zozaya	Olga Navarro
"Siempre te amaré"	Tania Elizabeth	Marieta
"Te digo que no"	María Antonieta	Rafael Espín
"Tú eres, tú eres"	Pablo Rosquet	Alfredo Martínez
"Y vas a ver"	Eduardo Antonio	Alberto Vera
"Y voy a ser"	Adán Rey	Osvaldo Rodríguez
"Yo tengo corazón"	Laronte	Laronte

=== Semi-final ===
The semi-final was held on Saturday 21 September 1991, beginning at 20:30 CDT (00:30+1 UTC). The twenty-four competing entries were performed in the semi-final.

=== Final ===
The final was held on Sunday 22 September 1991, beginning at 20:30 CDT (00:30+1 UTC).

The winner was "Si todos saben de ti", written by Rolando Ojeda, and performed by Delia Díaz de Villegas; with "Acorralada", written and performed by Tanya Rodríguez, and "Salgo a la calle" written by Demetrio Muñiz and performed by Malena Burke, both placing second; and "Guitarra que ha dejado de sonar", written by José Valladares and performed by Issac Delgado, placing third.

Winner

Result of the final of OTI 91, de La Habana a Acapulco (Note: Incomplete list of the competing entries.)
R/O	Song	Artist	Result
	"Si todos saben de ti"	Delia Díaz de Villegas	1
	"Acorralada"	Tanya Rodríguez	2
	"Salgo a la calle"	Malena Burke	2
	"Guitarra que ha dejado de sonar"	Issac Delgado	3

== At the OTI Festival ==
On 13–14 December 1991, the OTI Festival was held at the Salón Teotihuacán of the Centro de Convenciones in Acapulco, Mexico, hosted by Televisa, and broadcast live throughout Ibero-America. Delia Díaz de Villegas performed "Si todos saben de ti" in position 7 in the semi-final, with Miguel Patterson conducting the event's orchestra, and qualifying for the final. In the final, she performed in position 3. At the end, only the top three places were announced, and the entry was not one of them, remaining with the title of finalist.

The festival was broadcast on Cubavisión with a delay of a few minutes and with commentary by Soledad Delgado and Carlos Otero.
