= United States in the OTI Festival 1992 =

- OTI Festival 1992
- Participating broadcaster: Univision
- Country: United States
- Selection process: XV Festival Nacional de la Canción OTI–Univision
- Selection date: 17 September 1992

Competing entry
- Song: "No te mueras, América"
- Artist: Carlo de la Cima
- Songwriters: Carlo de la Cima; José Luis Mota

Placement
- Final result: 2nd

Participation chronology
◄1991 •	1992	• 1993►

The United States was represented at the OTI Festival 1992 with the song "No te mueras, América", written by Carlo de la Cima and José Luis Mota, and performed by de la Cima himself. The participating broadcaster representing the country, Univision, selected its entry through a national televised competition. The song, that was performed in position 9, placed second, out of 25 competing entries.

== National stage ==
Univision held a national televised competition to select its entry for the 21st edition of the OTI Festival. This was the fifteenth edition of the Festival Nacional de la Canción OTI–Univision. In the final, each song represented a Univision affiliate, each of which had selected its entry through a local pre-selection.

=== Central California pre-selection ===
On Sunday 16 August 1992, KFTV held a televised pre-selection at its studios in Fresno, beginning at 21:00 PDT (04:00+1 UTC). This fifteenth edition of the Central California Local OTI Festival featured eight songs. It was broadcast live on Channel 21.

The winner, and therefore qualified for the national final, was "Vamos a amarnos", written by Alfredo Castro and performed by Abel Gómez.

Qualifier

Result of the Local OTI Festival – Central California 1992
R/O	Song	Artist	Songwriter(s)	Result
	"Mil Recuerdos"	Rosa María González	Rosa María González	
	"Te olvidaré"	Moisés Bogran	Moisés Bogran	
	"Niña joven"	José Alarcón	José Alarcón	
	"Simplemente enamorada"	(Note: Additional singers were Marcos Felipe, Guadalupe Infante, and José Sánchez.)	Maribel Sepúlveda	
	"Amor eterno"	Daniel Antonio	Daniel Antonio	
	"Vamos a amarnos"	Abel Gómez	Alfredo Castro	Qualified
	"Así es el amor"		Trini Barajas	
	"Viejo"		Abel Ybarra	

=== Mideast pre-selection ===
On Tuesday 25 August 1992, WCIU held a televised pre-selection at Park West in Chicago. It was broadcast on Channel 26 on Thursday 3 September.

The jury was composed of five members. The winner, and therefore qualified for the national final, was "Llegar a ser", written by Eduardo Torres and performed by Sandra Antonyoqui.

Result of the Local OTI Festival – Mideast 1992 (Note: Incomplete list of the competing entries.)
R/O	Song	Artist	Songwriter(s)	Result
	"Llegar a ser"	Sandra Antonyoqui	Eduardo Torres	Qualified

=== Los Angeles pre-selection ===
On Thursday 27 August 1992, KMEX-TV held a televised pre-selection at the theatre of the California State University, Dominguez Hills in Carson. This fourteenth edition of the Los Angeles Local OTI Festival featured ten songs, shortlisted from the 350 received. To simplify production, the music of the competing entries was pre-recorded. It was presented by Laura Fabián and Fernando Escandón, and was broadcast on Channel 34 on Sunday 30 August. The show featured guest performances by Timbiriche and the duo Ivette e Ivonne.

The winner, and therefore qualified for the national final, was "No te mueras, América", written by Carlo de la Cima and José Luis Mota, and performed by de la Cima himself; with "Vuelve a ser tú", written by Ángelo Castel and Ricardo Osorio and performed by Ismael Gallegos, placing second; and "Bolsillos vacíos", written and performed by David F. Mozqueda, placing third.

Result of the Local OTI Festival – Los Angeles 1992
R/O	Song	Artist	Songwriter(s)	Result
	"No te mueras, América"	Carlo de la Cima	Carlo de la Cima; José Luis Mota	Qualified
	"Vuelve a ser tú"	Ismael Gallegos	Ángelo Castel; Ricardo Osorio	2
	"Bolsillos vacíos"	David F. Mozqueda	David F. Mozqueda	3

=== Final ===
The final was held on Thursday 17 September 1992 at the Gusman Center for the Performing Arts in Miami, beginning at 20:00 EDT (00:00+1 UTC), and featuring thirteen songs. It was presented by Daniela Romo and Antonio Vodanovic, and was broadcast live on all Univision affiliates. The show featured guest performances by Willie Colón, Los Bukis, Luis Ángel, and Daniela Romo.

The winner was "No te mueras, América" representing KMEX-TV–Los Angeles, written by Carlo de la Cima and José Luis Mota, and performed by de la Cima himself; with "Vamos a cambiar" representing WLTV–Miami, written and performed by Jimmy Paredes, placing second; and "América peregrina" representing KDTV–San Francisco, written by Hernán Moreno and performed by Alma Rocío, placing third. In addition, de la Cima received the Best Performer and Best Arrangement Awards. The festival ended with a reprise of the winning entry.

Winner

Result of the final of the XV Festival Nacional de la Canción OTI–Univision
R/O	Song	Artist	Songwriter(s)	Affiliate	Result
1	"Quiero volver a ti"	Raúl Fabre	Patricia Maldonado	KXLN-TV–Houston	—N/a
2	"El tiempo vuela"	César Alejandro	César Alejandro		—N/a
3	"Vamos a cambiar"	Jimmy Paredes	Jimmy Paredes	WLTV–Miami	2
4	"No te mueras, América"	Carlo de la Cima	Carlo de la Cima; José Luis Mota	KMEX-TV–Los Angeles	1
5	"Llegar a ser"	Sandra Antonyoqui	Eduardo Torres	WCIU–Chicago	—N/a
6	"Vamos a amarnos"	Abel Gómez	Alfredo Castro	KFTV–Fresno	—N/a
7	"Reencuentro con mi niña"	Rafael M. Más	Rafael M. Más	WBHS–Tampa	—N/a
8	"Soy esa mujer"	Leslie Lugo	Miguel Lacey	KWEX–San Antonio	—N/a
9	"América peregrina"	Alma Rocío	Hernán Moreno	KDTV–San Francisco	3
10	"Mañana saldrá el sol"	Leticia Carreón	Leticia Carreón	K17DI–San Diego	—N/a
11	"Fuego y cenizas"	Manuel Maceo	Manuel Maceo	KTVW-TV–Phoenix	—N/a
12	"Siguiéndote"	Ema Colón	Ema Colón	W48AW–Washington D.C.	—N/a
13	"Proclama"	Noé Pro			—N/a

== At the OTI Festival ==
On 5 December 1992, the OTI Festival was held at Teatro Principal in Valencia, Spain, hosted by Televisión Española (TVE), and broadcast live throughout Ibero-America. Carlo de la Cima performed "No te mueras, América" in position 9, with José Luis Mota conducting the event's orchestra, and placing second, out of 25 competing entries.
