= Cuba in the OTI Festival 1992 =

- OTI Festival 1992
- Participating broadcaster: Cuban Institute of Radio and Television (ICRT)
- Country: Cuba
- Selection process: OTI 92, de La Habana a Valencia
- Selection date: 4 October 1992

Competing entry
- Song: "Sólo para mí"
- Artist: Augusto Enríquez
- Songwriters: Julián Fernández; Emilio Vega; Augusto Enríquez

Placement
- Final result: Finalist

Participation chronology
◄1991 •	1992	• 1993►

Cuba was represented at the OTI Festival 1992 with the song "Sólo para mí", written by Julián Fernández, Emilio Vega, and Augusto Enríquez, and performed by Enríquez himself. The Cuban participating broadcaster, the Cuban Institute of Radio and Television (ICRT), selected its entry through a national televised competition. The song, that was performed in position 5, was not among the top-three places revealed.

== National stage ==
The Cuban Institute of Radio and Television (ICRT) held a national televised competition to select its entry for the 21st edition of the OTI Festival. This second edition of the national OTI festival, titled OTI 92, de La Habana a Valencia, featured twenty-one songs in a semi-final, of which ten qualified for the final. The broadcaster opened a three-month registration period in which it received 1,466 songs.

The shows were staged at the Karl Marx Theatre in Havana, were presented by Carlos Otero, Rakelita Mayedo, Susana Pérez, and Rafael Robledo, and were broadcast live on Cubavisión and Radio Progreso. All the competing entries were performed with live vocals and pre-recorded music. Each of the music videos that the broadcaster made of the entries, accompanied by a statement from the songwriter, had been broadcast one per day in a 5-minute slot in prime time on Cubavisión during the previous weeks.

The jury was composed of Demetrio Muñiz, Enriqueta Almanza, Héctor Quintero, Lourdes Torres, Luis Ríos Vega, Miguel Patterson, and Eugenio Pedraza Ginori.

Competing entries on OTI 92, de La Habana a Valencia
Song	Artist	Songwriter(s)
"Abandonar un sueño"	Irene Alpízar	Francisco Escorcia
"Algo más que amigos"	Aymée Nuviola and Francisco Céspedes	Aymée Nuviola; Francisco Céspedes
"Anoche descubrimos el amor"	Belkis Ramos	Mario Pino
"Calendario"	Manuel Marín	Manuel Marín; Fausto del Real
"Callada"	Mayra de la Vega	Carlos Miguel Ojeda
"Como campanas de amor"	Pedro José	Orlando Quesada
"Como lluvia en primavera"	Lourdes Nuviola	Manuel de Jesús Leyva; Freddy Morffe
"¿Dónde estás?"	Blanca Estrella	José Luis Fernández
"El buen amor"	Dayami Grasso	Sergio Morales
"Más allá del horizonte que buscaba"	Maureen García	Raúl Baydes
"Mejor será decirnos adiós"	Giselle Valdés	José Valladares
"Mi luna de miel"	Guillermo Alberto	Guillermo Alberto
"No me provoques"	Paulo FG	Clemente Delgado
"Para el nuevo año"	Alina Izquierdo	Ondina Mateo; Rafael Espín
"Porque existes"	Miguel Ángel Céspedes	Rolando Fernández
"Qué pena de querer"	Esther Llanes	Carol Quintana
"¿Qué será de esta noche sin ti?"	Evelyn García Márquez	Evelyn García Márquez
"Sigo vivo y puedo amar"	José Antonio Duany	Samuel Concepción
"Sólo para mí"	Augusto Enríquez	Augusto Enríquez; Julián Fernández; Emilio Vega
"Soñaba"	Rafael Sánchez Yero	José Valladares
"Y si tú no estás"	Raúl Araújo	Raúl Araújo

=== Semi-final ===
The semi-final was held on Saturday 3 October 1992. The twenty-one competing entries were performed in the semi-final.

Qualifier

Result of the semi-final of the OTI 92, de La Habana a Valencia
R/O	Song	Artist	Result
	"Abandonar un sueño"	Irene Alpízar	—N/a
	"Algo más que amigos"	Aymée Nuviola and Francisco Céspedes (Note: Céspedes' vocals were featured pre-recorded since he was absent.)	Qualified
	"Anoche descubrimos el amor"	Belkis Ramos	Qualified
	"Calendario"	Manuel Marín	—N/a
	"Callada"	Mayra de la Vega	Qualified
	"Como campanas de amor"	Pedro José	—N/a
	"Como lluvia en primavera"	Lourdes Nuviola	—N/a
	"¿Dónde estás?"	Blanca Estrella	—N/a
	"El buen amor"	Dayami Grasso	Qualified
	"Más allá del horizonte que buscaba"	Maureen García	—N/a
	"Mejor será decirnos adiós"	Giselle Valdés	—N/a
	"Mi luna de miel"	Guillermo Alberto	—N/a
	"No me provoques"	Paulo FG	—N/a
	"Para el nuevo año"	Alina Izquierdo	Qualified
	"Porque existes"	Miguel Ángel Céspedes	Qualified
	"Qué pena de querer"	Esther Llanes	Qualified
	"¿Qué será de esta noche sin ti?"	Evelyn García Márquez	Qualified
	"Sigo vivo y puedo amar"	José Antonio Duany	—N/a
	"Sólo para mí"	Augusto Enríquez	Qualified
	"Soñaba"	Rafael Sánchez Yero	Qualified
	"Y si tú no estás"	Raúl Araújo	—N/a

=== Final ===
The final was held on Sunday 4 October 1992.

The winner was "Sólo para mí", written by Julián Fernández, Emilio Vega, and Augusto Enríquez, and performed by Enríquez himself; with "Para el nuevo año", written by Ondina Mateo and Rafael Espín and performed by Alina Izquierdo, placing second; and "Soñaba", written by José Valladares and performed by Rafael Sánchez Yero, placing third.

Winner

Result of the semi-final of the OTI 92, de La Habana a Valencia
R/O	Song	Artist	Result
	"Algo más que amigos"	Aymée Nuviola and Francisco Céspedes	—N/a
	"Anoche descubrimos el amor"	Belkis Ramos	—N/a
	"Callada"	Mayra de la Vega	—N/a
	"El buen amor"	Dayami Grasso	—N/a
	"Para el nuevo año"	Alina Izquierdo	2
	"Porque existes"	Miguel Ángel Céspedes	—N/a
	"Qué pena de querer"	Esther Llanes	—N/a
	"¿Qué será de esta noche sin ti?"	Evelyn García Márquez	—N/a
	"Sólo para mí"	Augusto Enríquez	1
	"Soñaba"	Rafael Sánchez Yero	3

== At the OTI Festival ==
On 5 December 1992, the OTI Festival was held at Teatro Principal in Valencia, Spain, hosted by Televisión Española (TVE), and broadcast live throughout Ibero-America. Augusto Enríquez performed "Sólo para mí" in position 5. The song was not among the top-three places revealed.
