= Chile in the OTI Festival 1991 =

- OTI Festival 1991
- Participating broadcasters: Televisión Nacional de Chile (TVN); Corporación de Televisión de la Universidad Católica de Chile (UCTV); Red de Televisión de la Universidad de Chile (RTU)
- Country: Chile
- Selection process: Una canción para el invierno
- Selection date: 13 August 1991

Competing entry
- Song: "Haciendo música"
- Artist: Claudio
- Songwriter: Scottie Scott

Placement
- Semi-final result: Qualified
- Final result: Finalist

Participation chronology
◄1990 •	1991	• 1992►

Chile was represented at the OTI Festival 1991 with the song "Haciendo música", written by Scottie Scott, and performed by Claudio. The Chilean participating broadcasters, Televisión Nacional de Chile (TVN), Corporación de Televisión de la Universidad Católica de Chile (UCTV), and Red de Televisión de la Universidad de Chile (RTU), selected their entry through a national televised competition with several phases. The song, qualified from the semi-final, was one of the finalists.

== National stage ==
Televisión Nacional de Chile (TVN), Corporación de Televisión de la Universidad Católica de Chile (UCTV), and Red de Televisión de la Universidad de Chile (RTU), agreed to designate as their entry for the 20th edition of the OTI Festival the winner of the regular competition Una canción para el invierno held within the show Martes 13 on UCTV's Canal 13. The deadline for song submissions was 29 July 1991, and nearly 200 songs were received.

Una canción para el invierno featured nine songs in three qualifying rounds of three songs each, held on 23 and 30 July and 6 August 1991. From each round, one song advanced to the three-song final held on 13 August. The shows were presented by Javier Miranda and Viviana Nunes.

Competing entries on Una canción para el invierno 1991
Song	Artist	Songwriter(s)
"Como la marea no soy"	María Inés Naveillán	Luis "Poncho" Venegas
"Donde vayas, donde estés"	Cristóbal	Cristián Araya
"Haciendo música"	Claudio	Scottie Scott
"La vecina"	Cecilia Castro	Loreto Valenzuela
"No basta con una canción"	Pancho Puelma	Pancho Puelma
"Sueño de abril"	Marco Antonio Fernández	Marco Antonio Fernández
"Tan sólo tú"	Luis Dimas	Guillermo Soto
"Un corazón herido"	Sebastián	Sergio Huidobro
"Vuelve"	Jorge Caraccioli	Víctor Arriagada

=== Qualifying rounds ===
The three qualifying rounds were held on 23 and 30 July and 6 August 1991. In each round, twenty-five expert jurors were grouped into five groups: musicians, technicians, writers, communicators, and singers. The spokesperson for each group cast a vote aloud for their group's favorite song. The song with the most votes in each round advanced to the final.

Result of the qualifying rounds of Una canción para el invierno 1991
R/O	Song	Artist	Result
First qualifying round – 23 July 1991
1	"No basta con una canción"	Pancho Puelma	—N/a
2	"Un corazón herido"	Sebastián	—N/a
3	"Sueño de abril"	Marco Antonio Fernández	Qualified
Second qualifying round – 30 July 1991
1	"La vecina"	Cecilia Castro	Qualified
2	"Tan sólo tú"	Luis Dimas	—N/a
3	"Vuelve"	Jorge Caraccioli	—N/a
Third qualifying round – 6 August 1991
1	"Donde vayas, donde estés"	Cristóbal	—N/a
2	"Haciendo música"	Claudio	Qualified
3	"Como la marea no soy"	María Inés Naveillán	—N/a

=== Final ===
The final was held on 13 August 1991. The voting method was the same as in the semi-finals, with the song with the most votes winning. The winner was "Haciendo música", written by Scottie Scott, and performed by Claudio. The show ended with a reprise of the winning entry.

Winner

Result of the final of Una canción para el invierno 1991
R/O	Song	Artist	Points	Result
1	"Sueño de abril"	Marco Antonio Fernández	0	2
2	"La vecina"	Cecilia Castro	0	2
3	"Haciendo música"	Claudio	5	1

Detailed vote of the final of Una canción para el invierno 1991
R/O	Song	Musicians	Technicians	Writers	Communicators	Singers	Total
1	"Sueño de abril"						0
2	"La vecina"						0
3	"Haciendo música"	1	1	1	1	1	5

Jurors in the final
Musicians	Francisco Aranda; Patricio González; Óscar Olsen; Miguel Pizarro; Horacio Saavedra (spokesperson)
Technicians	Héctor Astete; Cristián Olavarría; Hernán Pereira; Gustavo Varas; Juan Carlos Gil (spokesperson)
Writers	Luis Advis; Eduardo Carrasco; Fernando Cuadra; Sergio Vodanović; María Angélica Ramírez (spokesperson)
Communicators	Katherine Salosny; Ítalo Passalacqua; Jorge Ramírez; Julio Videla; Jorge Rencoret (spokesperson)
Singers	Patricia Frías; Luis Le-Bert; Álvaro Scaramelli; Antonio Zabaleta; Sonia von Schrebler (spokesperson)

== At the OTI Festival ==
On 13–14 December 1991, the OTI Festival was held at the Salón Teotihuacán of the Centro de Convenciones in Acapulco, Mexico, hosted by Televisa, and broadcast live throughout Ibero-America. Claudio performed "Haciendo música" in position 17 in the semi-final, with René Calderón conducting the event's orchestra, and qualifying for the final. In the final, he performed in position 9. At the end, only the top three places were announced, and the Chilean entry was not one of them, remaining with the title of finalist.
