= United States in the OTI Festival 1991 =

- OTI Festival 1991
- Participating broadcaster: Univision
- Country: United States
- Selection process: XIV Festival Nacional de la Canción OTI–Univision
- Selection date: 19 September 1991

Competing entry
- Song: "Qué poca fe"
- Artist: Elsa Ozuna
- Songwriter: Lucho Neves

Placement
- Semi-final result: Qualified
- Final result: Finalist

Participation chronology
◄1990 •	1991	• 1992►

The United States was represented at the OTI Festival 1991 with the song "Qué poca fe", written by Lucho Neves, and performed by Elsa Ozuna. The participating broadcaster representing the country, Univision, selected its entry through a national televised competition. The song, qualified from the semi-final, was one of the finalists.

== National stage ==
Univision held a national televised competition to select its entry for the 20th edition of the OTI Festival. This was the fourteenth edition of the Festival Nacional de la Canción OTI–Univision. In the final, each song represented a Univision affiliate, each of which had selected its entry through a local pre-selection.

=== El Paso pre-selection ===
On Monday 12 August 1991, KINT-TV held a televised pre-selection at the Marriott hotel in El Paso, beginning at 20:00 MDT (02:00+1 UTC). This seventh edition of the El Paso Local OTI Festival featured ten songs. It was presented by Armando de la Fuente and Marcela García, and broadcast on Channel 26 on Saturday 24 August.

The winner, and therefore qualified for the national final, was "Papá", written and performed by Tony Solo; with "No queda nada", written by María Ramos and performed by Cecilia Noel, placing second; and "Te amo", written by Fernando Olivares and performed by Gabriel Martínez, placing third. In addition, Cecilia Noel received the Outstanding Female Performer Award, Gabriel Martínez the Outstanding Male Performer Award, and Fernando Lechuga the Best Arranger Award for "No queda nada".

Qualifier

Result of the Local OTI Festival – El Paso 1991
R/O	Song	Artist	Songwriter(s)	Result
	"Somos todos"	Laura Hernández	Irma Mendoza	—N/a
	"Imágenes de amor"	Patsy Nájera	Alicia Quintana	—N/a
	"Te amo"	Gabriel Martínez	Fernando Olivares	3
	"Semillia de amor"	Ray Soto	Ray Soto	—N/a
	"Soy feliz"	Jacqueline Fournier	Sergio Carmona	—N/a
	"Te extrañaré"	Manuel Gálvez	Manuel Gálvez	—N/a
	"Soñadores"	Luis Enrique Pérez	Jesús Issac Selah	—N/a
	"Papá"	Tony Solo	Tony Solo	Qualified
	"No queda nada"	Cecilia Noel	María Ramos	2
	"Porque soy mujer"	María Esther Martínez	José Sandoval	—N/a

=== Central California pre-selection ===
On Saturday 18 August 1991, KFTV held a televised pre-selection, beginning at 21:00 PDT (04:00+1 UTC). This fourteenth edition of the Central California Local OTI Festival featured ten songs, accompanied by a 13-piece orchestra. It was presented by Daniel Rodríguez and Norma Roque, and broadcast live on Channel 21.

The winner, and therefore qualified for the national final, was "Con tus propias alas", written by Waldo Arturo, and performed by Ricardo Matiz; with "Te necesito", written by Moisés Borgran and performed by Rosa María González, placing second; and "Ahora me dices", written by José Montenegro and performed by Rodrigo González, placing third. In addition, González received the Best Performer Award, and Arturo received the Best Musical Arrangement Award for "Te necesito".

Result of the Local OTI Festival – Central California 1991 (Note: Incomplete list of the competing entries.)
R/O	Song	Artist	Songwriter(s)	Result
	"Con tus propias alas"	Ricardo Matiz	Waldo Arturo	Qualified
	"Te necesito"	Rosa María González	Moisés Borgran	2
	"Ahora me dices"	Rodrigo González	José Montenegro	3

=== Los Angeles pre-selection ===
KMEX-TV held a televised pre-selection at the Schulman Video Center Studios in Los Angeles. This thirteenth edition of the Los Angeles Local OTI Festival featured eight songs. It was presented by Teresa Quevedo and Fernando Escandón, and broadcast on Channel 34. The show featured a guest performance by Guillermo Fernández.

The winner, and therefore qualified for the national final, was "Tú y yo", written by Richard Gómez, and performed by Leyla Hoyle; with "Una vez más", written by Roscoe and performed by José Enrique Ternbach, placing second; and ""Junto a ti", written and performed by Irasema Venezia, placing third.

Result of the Local OTI Festival – Los Angeles 1991
R/O	Song	Artist	Songwriter(s)	Result
	"Tú y yo"	Leyla Hoyle	Richard Gómez	Qualified
	"Una vez más"	Roscoe	José Enrique Ternbach	2
	"Junto a ti"	Irasema Venezia	Irasema Venezia	3
	"Eclipse personal"	Sandra Yavar	Hernán Gutiérrez	—N/a

=== Mideast pre-selection ===
WCIU held a televised pre-selection in Lincoln Park, Chicago. This edition of the Mideast Local OTI Festival featured ten songs. It was presented by Lorena Abrego, and broadcast on Channel 26.

Result of the Local OTI Festival – Mideast 1991
R/O	Song	Artist	Songwriter(s)	Result
	"Prisionero de tu amor"	Roberto Sánchez	Rubén Barba G.	

=== Arizona pre-selection ===
KTVW-TV held a televised pre-selection. It was broadcast on Channel 33.

The winner, and therefore qualified for the national final, was "Así yo lo amo", written by Félix Acevedo and Eda Myrack and performed by María Pilar.

Result of the Local OTI Festival – Arizona 1991
R/O	Song	Artist	Songwriter(s)	Result
	"Así yo lo amo"	María Pilar	Félix Acevedo; Eda Myrack	Qualified

=== Final ===
The final was held on Thursday 19 September 1991 at the Gusman Center for the Performing Arts in Miami, featuring fourteen songs. It was presented by Antonio Vodanovic and Andrea Kutyas, and broadcast live on all Univision affiliates. The show featured guest performances by Yordano, Lourdes Robles, Nino Segarra, Víctor Víctor, and Miguel Gallardo.

The jury was composed of Concha Valdés Miranda, Rubén Fuentes, Betty Pino, Valentín Trujillo, Braulio, Olga Guillot, Fernando Allende, Yordano, Lourdes Robles, Miguel Gallardo, and Kiara.

The winner was "Qué poca fe" representing W48AW–Washington D.C., written by Lucho Neves, and performed by Elsa Ozuna; with "Latinoamérica, sos gitana" representing KDTV–San Francisco, written by Patricia Leal and Hernán Moreno and performed by Alma Rocío, placing second; and "Así yo lo amo" representing KTVW-TV–Phoenix, written by Félix Acevedo and Eda Myrack and performed by María Pilar, placing third. In addition, Elsa Ozuna received the Best Performer Award, and Lucho Neves the Best Musical Arrangement Award. The festival ended with a reprise of the winning entry.

Winner

Result of the final of the XV Festival Nacional de la Canción OTI–Univision
R/O	Song	Artist	Songwriter(s)	Affiliate	Result
	"Qué poca fe"	Elsa Ozuna	Lucho Neves	W48AW–Washington D.C.	1
	"Con tus propias alas"	Ricardo Matiz	Waldo Arturo	KFTV–Fresno	—N/a
	"Tú y yo"	Leyla Hoyle	Richard Gómez	KMEX-TV–Los Angeles	—N/a
	"Latinoamérica, sos gitana"	Alma Rocío	Patricia Leal; Hernán Moreno	KDTV–San Francisco	2
	"Así yo lo amo"	María Pilar	Félix Acevedo; Eda Myrack	KTVW-TV–Phoenix	3
	"Canto a las mujeres"	Miguel Ángel Guerra		WLTV–Miami	—N/a
	"Papá"	Tony Solo	Tony Solo	KINT-TV–El Paso	—N/a
				WCIU–Chicago	—N/a

== At the OTI Festival ==
On 13–14 December 1991, the OTI Festival was held at the Salón Teotihuacán of the Centro de Convenciones in Acapulco, Mexico, hosted by Televisa, and broadcast live throughout Ibero-America. Elsa Ozuna performed "Qué poca fe" in position 23 in the semi-final, with Lucho Neves conducting the event's orchestra, and qualifying for the final. In the final, she performed in position 5. At the end, only the top three places were announced, and the entry was not one of them, remaining with the title of finalist.
