= Joaquín Prat =

Spanish television presenter and announcer

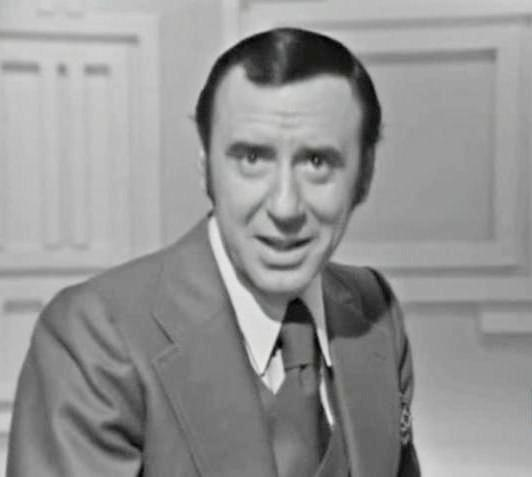
- Born: Joaquín Prat Carreras; 27 April 1927; Xàtiva, Spain
- Died: 3 June 1995 (aged 68); Madrid, Spain
- Resting place: Cementerio de la Almudena
- Occupation: Presenter
- Employer: TVE
- Spouses: Anne McKiernan (1973–1984); Marianne Sandberg (1984–1995)
- Children: Ana Isabel, Susana, Joaquín, Alejandra, Federico, Andrea
- Awards: Ondas Award (1970, 1989)

Joaquín Prat Carreras (27 April 1927 – 3 June 1995) was one of the best-known Spanish radio and television presenters.

== Biography ==
Joaquín Prat was born in Xàtiva on 27 April 1927. He earned a licentiate in Law, and before becoming famous, worked as an administrative officer. In 1959 he joined Radio Nacional de España. He went on to work on more than 20 radio programs. He appeared on Cadena SER until 1987, with iconic shows such as Mañanas de Radio Madrid, Ustedes son formidables, Radio Madrid madrugada, and Carrusel Deportivo. He was on Cadena COPE from 1987 to 1990 with Vivir es formidable and Tiempo de juego, and on Radio Nacional de España beginning in 1990 with Apúntate 5 and La peña.

On television he made his debut with the popular game show Un millón para el mejor (1968), where he would remain for a year before being replaced by José Luis Pécker. That same year he began his professional pairing with Laurita Valenzuela on the musical show Galas del sábado (1968–1970), by Fernando García de la Vega, which achieved enormous popularity. He would also appear together with the actress and presenter on Canción 71, a similar program.

From 1988 to 1993 he presented El precio justo (the Spanish edition of The Price Is Right), a game show on which he made famous the exclamation ¡A jugar! (Let's play!), accompanied by a distinctive arm movement. On 5 December 1992, he hosted the OTI Festival 1992 along Paloma San Basilio.

Other programs he presented were:

- A la española (1971), musical program
- Siempre en domingo (1971), with Manuel Martín Ferrand
- Cambie su suerte (1974), with José Luis Pécker
- Destino Argentina (1978), game show about the FIFA World Cup
- Cosas (1980–1981), with Mónica Randall and Marisa Abad
- Otras cosas (1981–1982), with Lola Martínez, Mari Ángeles Morales, Elena Escobar, and Isabel Bauzá
- Noches de gala (1993–1994), with Miriam Díaz-Aroca
- ¿Cómo lo veis? (1994) (Spanish edition of Family Feud)

He received two Premios Ondas: in 1970 (National Television) as Best Presenter, and in 1989 (National Radio) for Vivir es formidable. He also received the TP de Oro three times: as Best Presenter in 1980 for Cosas, in 1988 for El precio justo, and a professional career award in 1991.

He was married to Irishwoman Anne McKiernan from 1973 to 1984, and to Marianne Sandberg from Denmark from 1984 to 1995.

His children Joaquín, Alejandra, and Andrea Prat Sandberg have also dedicated themselves to the world of television.

Joaquín Prat died in Madrid on 3 June 1995 after suffering a myocardial infarction and spending two months in a coma.

Preceded by José Luis Uribarri	Eurovision Song Contest; Spanish Commentator; 1971	Succeeded by Julio Rico
