= OTI Festival 1992 =

21st OTI Song Festival

Date and venue
- Final: 5 December 1992
- Venue: Teatro Principal; Valencia, Spain

Organization
- Organizer: Organización de Televisión Iberoamericana (OTI)

Production
- Host broadcaster: Televisión Española (TVE)
- Director: Jaime Azpilicueta
- Presenters: Paloma San Basilio; Joaquín Prat

Participants
- Number of entries: 25
- Debuting countries: Equatorial Guinea
- Returning countries: Netherlands Antilles
- Non-returning countries: Aruba
- Participation map: Participating countries Countries that participated in the past but not in 1992

Vote
- Voting system: The members of a single jury selected their favourite songs in a secret vote
- Winning song: Spain "A dónde voy sin ti"

The OTI Festival 1992 (Spanish: Vigésimo Primer Gran Premio de la Canción Iberoamericana, Portuguese: Vigésimo Primeiro Grande Prêmio da Canção Ibero-Americana) was the 21st edition of the OTI Festival, held on 5 December 1992 at Teatro Principal in Valencia, Spain, and presented by Paloma San Basilio and Joaquín Prat. It was organised by the Organización de Televisión Iberoamericana (OTI) and host broadcaster Televisión Española (TVE).

Broadcasters from twenty-five countries participated in the festival. The winner was the song "A dónde voy sin ti", written by Chema Purón, and performed by Francisco representing Spain; with "No te mueras, América", written by Carlo de la Cima and José Luis Mota, and performed by de la Cima himself representing the United States, placing second; and "Te prometo", written by Pablo Herrera and Alejandra Silva, and performed by Herrera himself representing Chile, placing third. Francisco became the only performer to have won the competition twice.

== Location ==
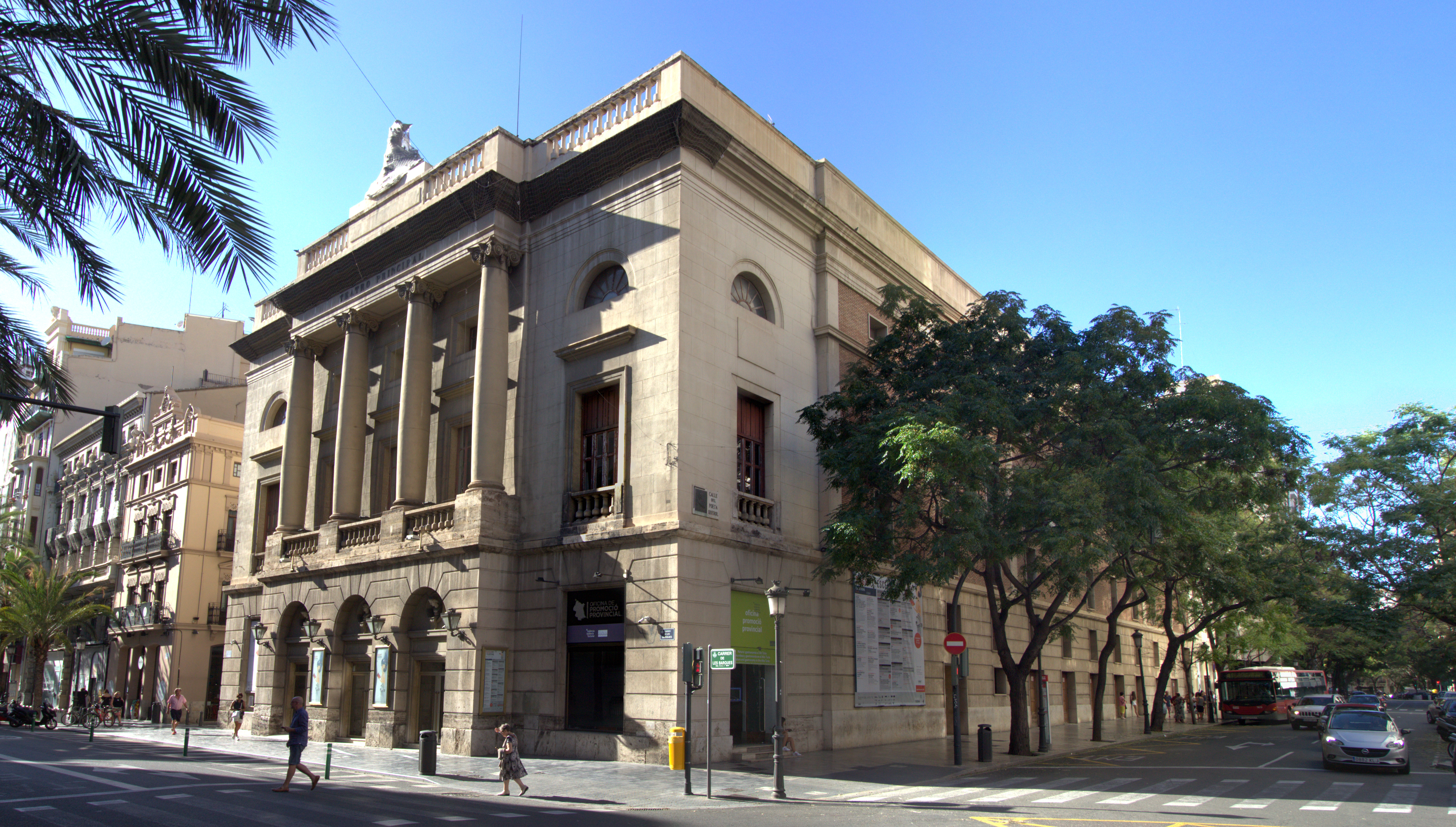
Teatro Principal, Valencia – host venue of the OTI Festival 1992.

The Organización de Televisión Iberoamericana (OTI) designated Televisión Española (TVE) as the host broadcaster for the 21st edition of the OTI Festival, to join the events and commemorations that would take place in 1992 in Spain coinciding with the Columbus Quincentenary. TVE staged the event in Valencia. The venue selected was the Teatro Principal, a theatre opened in 1832 that was designed by Filippo da Pistoia.

== Participants ==
Broadcasters from twenty-five countries participated in this edition of the OTI festival, marking the first time that the highest number of participants was achieved. The OTI members, public or private broadcasters from Spain, Portugal, and twenty-three Spanish and Portuguese speaking countries of Ibero-America signed up for the festival. From the countries that participated in the previous edition, Aruba did not return, while the Netherlands Antilles returned. Equatorial Guinea participated for the first time, which would be its only appearance at the festival.

Some of the participating broadcasters, such as those representing Chile, Cuba, the Netherlands Antilles, and the United States, selected their entries through their regular national televised competitions. Other broadcasters decided to select their entry internally. A 15 years old Shakira was initially considered to represent Colombia, but because the rules did not allow performers under 18, she was not allowed to participate.

Four performing artists had represented the same country previously: Humberto Nivi had represented the Netherlands Antilles in 1974, Francisco had won the festival for Spain in 1981, Jesús Fichamba had represented Ecuador in 1985, and Cheo Zorrilla had represented the Dominican Republic in 1986.

Participants of the OTI Festival 1992
Country	Broadcaster(s)	Song	Artist	Songwriter(s)	Language	Conductor
Argentina		"Lo vivido"	Horacio Molina	Eladia Blázquez; Horacio Molina	Spanish	
Bolivia		"Eternamente amada"	Erick Ocampo	Erick Ocampo; H. Vilardel	Spanish	
Canada		"Cómo te puedo amar"	José Alcides	Luis Geraldino	Spanish	
Chile	TVN; UCTV; RTU; CCT; Megavisión	"Te prometo"	Pablo Herrera	Pablo Herrera; Alejandra Silva	Spanish	
Colombia		"Yo no sé si estoy de moda"	Alexandra Villar	Socorro Delgado; Diego Delgado	Spanish	
Costa Rica	Univisión de Costa Rica	"Igual que una mujer enamorada"	Rodolfo González	Álvaro Esquivel	Spanish	
Cuba	ICRT	"Sólo para mí"	Augusto Enríquez	Julián Fernández; Emilio Vega; Augusto Enríquez	Spanish	
Dominican Republic		"A su tiempo"	Cheo Zorrilla	Cheo Zorrilla; Manuel Tejada	Spanish	
Ecuador		"Una canción para dos mundos"	Jesús Fichamba	Luis Padilla Guevara	Spanish	
El Salvador	TCS	"Ruego"	María Gabriela	María Gabriela Jovel	Spanish	
Equatorial Guinea	TVGE	"Canto a la fraternidad"	Bessoso	A. Olo Mibuy	Spanish	
Guatemala		"De la mano"	Edgar David Ávalos	C. Recinos; V. Quezada	Spanish	
Honduras		"El otro muro"	Karina Nasser	Emilio Fonseca; Víctor Donaire	Spanish	
Mexico	Televisa	"Enamorado de la vida"	Arturo Vargas	José Luis Almada; Jorge Massías	Spanish	
Netherlands Antilles	ATM	"Vivencias"	Humberto Nivi	Humberto Nivi; Lito Scarso	Spanish	
Nicaragua		"Tocando luz"	Cristian Somarriva	Eugenio Andrade	Spanish	
Panama	RPC-TV	"Memorias"	Eduardo Laly Carrizo	Pedro Azael	Spanish	
Paraguay		"Un amanecer, una canción"	Óscar Benito		Spanish	
Peru		"Así como te doy, te quito"	Tania Helfgott	Denise Echeverría; Óscar Cavero	Spanish	Óscar Cavero
Portugal	RTP	"Uma avenida inteira da saudade"	Cristina Rock	J. Pessoa; C. Mendes	Portuguese	
Puerto Rico	Telemundo Puerto Rico	"Atrapada en el tiempo"	Brenda Reyes	Rodolfo Barrera	Spanish	
Spain	TVE	"A dónde voy sin ti"	Francisco	Chema Purón	Spanish	Jesús Glück
United States	Univision	"No te mueras, América"	Carlo de la Cima	Carlo de la Cima; José Luis Mota	Spanish	José Luis Mota
Uruguay	Sociedad Televisora Larrañaga	"Llegaste a mí"	Gustavo Nocetti	Mario de Azaga	Spanish	
Venezuela		"Sueños"	Karolina	Luis Alva	Spanish	

== Festival overview ==
The festival was held on Saturday 5 December 1992, beginning at 22:00 CET (21:00 UTC). It was directed by Jaime Azpilicueta, and presented by Paloma San Basilio and Joaquín Prat. San Basilio had previously presented the festival in 1985. In between the competing songs, the show featured eight musical-theatrical scenes in homage to Spanish and Ibero-American composers by eighty musicians, fifty choristers, twenty dancers, and ten soloists such as Serafin Zubiri. The budget for organizing the event was US$7 million. The draw to determine the running order (R/O) was held a few days before the event, where for the first time it was established in advance that the host country would perform in the last position, a rule that remained in place until 1996.

The winner was the song "A dónde voy sin ti", written by Chema Purón, and performed by Francisco representing Spain; with "No te mueras, América", written by Carlo de la Cima and José Luis Mota, and performed by de la Cima himself representing the United States, placing second; and "Te prometo", written by Pablo Herrera and Alejandra Silva, and performed by Herrera himself representing Chile, placing third. The first prize was endowed with a monetary amount of US$50,000, the second prize of US$30,000, and the third prize of US$20,000. Francisco became the only performer to have won the competition twice. The festival ended with a reprise of the winning entry.

Winner

Results of the OTI Festival 1992
R/O	Country	Song	Artist	Place
1	Honduras	"El otro muro"	Karina Nasser	—N/a
2	Nicaragua	"Tocando luz"	Cristian Somarriva	—N/a
3	Portugal	"Uma avenida inteira da saudade"	Cristina Rock	—N/a
4	Ecuador	"Una canción para dos mundos"	Jesús Fichamba	—N/a
5	Cuba	"Sólo para mí"	Augusto Enríquez	—N/a
6	Mexico	"Enamorado de la vida"	Arturo Vargas	—N/a
7	Argentina	"Lo vivido"	Horacio Molina	—N/a
8	Bolivia	"Eternamente amada"	Erick Ocampo	—N/a
9	United States	"No te mueras, América"	Carlo de la Cima	2
10	Panama	"Memorias"	Eduardo Laly Carrizo	—N/a
11	Canada	"Cómo te puedo amar"	José Alcides	—N/a
12	Netherlands Antilles	"Vivencias"	Humberto Nivi	—N/a
13	Venezuela	"Sueños"	Karolina	—N/a
14	Chile	"Te prometo"	Pablo Herrera	3
15	Paraguay	"Un amanecer, una canción"	Óscar Benito	—N/a
16	Colombia	"Yo no sé si estoy de moda"	Alexandra Villar	—N/a
17	El Salvador	"Ruego"	María Gabriela	—N/a
18	Equatorial Guinea	"Canto a la fraternidad"	Bessoso	—N/a
19	Costa Rica	"Igual que una mujer enamorada"	Rodolfo González	—N/a
20	Dominican Republic	"A su tiempo"	Cheo Zorrilla	—N/a
21	Guatemala	"De la mano"	Edgar David Ávalos	—N/a
22	Peru	"Así como te doy, te quito"	Tania Helfgott	—N/a
23	Puerto Rico	"Atrapada en el tiempo"	Brenda Reyes	—N/a
24	Uruguay	"Llegaste a mí"	Gustavo Nocetti	—N/a
25	Spain	"A dónde voy sin ti"	Francisco	1

=== Jury ===
The nine members of a single jury selected their favourite songs in a secret vote. The voting system was not disclosed, and only the top three places were revealed. The members of the jury were:

- Luis Aguilé – singer-songwriter
- Fernando Carrillo – actor
- José Ferriz – conductor
- Eugenia León – singer, won the festival for Mexico in 1985
- Massiel – singer
- Betty Missiego – singer, represented Peru in 1972
- Peret – singer-songwriter, wrote the entry representing Spain in 1991
- Salomé – singer
- Fernando Tordo – singer-songwriter

== Broadcast ==
The festival was broadcast in the 25 participating countries where the corresponding OTI member broadcasters relayed the contest through their networks after receiving it live via satellite. The festival was also available through a direct broadcast satellite (DBS) channel, in what was Retevisión's first test broadcast on the recently launched Hispasat 1A satellite.

Known details on the broadcasts in each country, including the specific broadcasting stations and commentators are shown in the tables below.

Broadcasters and commentators in participating countries
Country	Broadcaster	Channel(s)	Commentator(s)	Ref.
Costa Rica	Univisión de Costa Rica	Univisión Canal 2 (Note: Delayed broadcast at 16:00 CST (22:00 UTC))		
Mexico	Televisa	Canal 2 (Note: Delayed broadcast at 22:30 CST (04:30+1 UTC))		
Netherlands Antilles	ATM	TeleCuraçao (Note: Delayed broadcast at 20:30 AST (00:30+1 UTC))		
Panama	RPC-TV	Canal 4 (Note: Delayed broadcast at 21:00 EST (02:00+1 UTC))		
Spain	TVE	La Primera	No commentary	
United States	Univision (Note: Delayed broadcast later that day by all Univision affiliates, each in their own time zone.)			
