= Joaquín Prat Sandberg =

Spanish television personality and journalist

Joaquín Prat
- Born: Joaquín Oliver Prat Sandberg; 17 April 1975 (age 51); Madrid, Spain
- Education: European University of Madrid
- Occupations: Television personality Journalist
- Years active: 2009–present
- Employer: Mediaset España
- Television: Vamos a ver (2023–present)
- Parents: Joaquín Prat; Marianne Sandberg

Joaquín Oliver Prat Sandberg is a Spanish journalist and TV personality on the Mediaset España network. He is best known for hosting the daytime magazine show Vamos a ver on Telecinco, in the late afternoons.

== Biography ==
The son of the veteran TV presenter Joaquín Prat and his Danish wife Marianne Sandberg, he got a degree in Journalism at the European University of Madrid, after dropping out of his Economics course at the Complutense University. He started working in radio at Cadena SER, after getting work experience in the medium with influential journalist Iñaki Gabilondo on Hoy por hoy.

He moved to television in 2008 on the Localia network of local stations, hosting El octavo mandamiento with Javier Cárdenas. Later that year he joined the Cuatro channel hosting Visto y odio with Raquel Sánchez-Silva.

In 2009 he moved to Telecinco to host its New Year broadcast La noche en Paz with Paz Padilla, which he hosted until 2016. That same year he also joined its morning show El programa de Ana Rosa, with Ana Rosa Quintana.

In 2013 he hosted his own reality show on Telecinco called El campamento de verano. It was axed after one series. In September 2014, he became a judge on the first series of Pequeños gigantes, a kids' talent show.

His return to Cadena SER was announced on 21 July 2015, to host sports show Carrusel Deportivo, following in the footsteps of his father. He left at the end of the season.

In November 2019 he returned to Cuatro to host Cuatro al día, the channel's current affairs discussion show. In July 2022, he received criticism on social media after strongly criticising Equality Minister Irene Montero on that show, while guests rebuked his outburst. On 18 July 2022, he swapped back to Telecinco to front Ya es mediodía after Sonsoles Ónega jumped ship to Antena 3.

In 2020 he hosted Mediaset's cross-continental game show EuroGames, seen as a revival of Jeux sans frontières.

In September 2023 he started to host daytime show Vamos a ver, seen to be a continuation of the now-cancelled El programa de Ana Rosa, from 10:30 to 15:00. The show received good ratings.

In August 2024, he hosted Dinastías, a show following some of Spain's most influential families.

Prat continued to host Vamos a ver, albeit for a shorter duration, after El programa de Ana Rosa came back in 2025. He took a two-week break in February while the show accustomed to its later timeslot before properly returning on 17 February 2025.

== Television career ==
| Year | Programme | Channel | Notes |
|---|---|---|---|
| 2008 | El octavo mandamiento | Localia | Co-host |
| 2008 | Visto y odio | Cuatro | Co-host |
| 2009–2023 | El programa de Ana Rosa | Telecinco | Collaborator |
| 2009–2016 | La noche en Paz | Telecinco | Co-host |
| 2010 | Caiga Quien Caiga | Telecinco | Guest |
| 2011 | ¡Qué tiempo tan feliz! | Telecinco | Guest |
| 2011–2016 | Pasapalabra | Telecinco | Guest, three weeks in 2011, 2013 and 2016 |
| 2013 | El Campamento de Verano | Telecinco | Host |
| 2014 | Pequeños gigantes | Telecinco | Judge |
| 2017 | Dani&Flo | Cuatro | Guest |
| 2019–2022 | Cuatro al día | Cuatro | Host |
| 2019 | Sálvame | Telecinco | Guest |
| 2020 | EuroGames | Telecinco | Co-host |
| 2021–2022 | ¡Viva la fiesta! | Telecinco | New Year broadcast; host |
| 2022 | Planeta Calleja | Telecinco | Guest |
| 2022 | Julián Muñoz: no es la hora de la venganza, es la hora de la verdad | Telecinco | Presenter |
| 2022 | Maite Zaldívar: maldita la hora | Telecinco | Presenter |
| 2022–2023 | Ya es mediodía | Telecinco | Presenter |
| 2023 | La caza del encantador | Telecinco | Presenter |
| 2023 | La noche de Bosé | Telecinco | Presenter |
| 2023–present | Vamos a ver | Telecinco | Presenter |
| 2024 | Dinastías | Telecinco | Presenter |
