= Cuba in the OTI Festival =

- OTI Festival
- Participating broadcaster: Cuban Institute of Radio and Television (ICRT)

Participation summary
- Appearances: 9
- First appearance: 1991
- Last appearance: 2000
- Highest placement: 3rd: 1995
- Participation history: 1991; 1992; 1993; 1994; 1995; 1996; 1997; 1998; 2000

The participation of Cuba in the OTI Festival began at the twentieth OTI Festival in 1991. The Cuban participating broadcaster was the Cuban Institute of Radio and Television (ICRT), which was member of the Organización de Televisión Iberoamericana (OTI). ICRT participated in all nine editions after its debut. Its best place in the festival was third achieved in 1995.

== History ==
The very first Cuban entry in the contest was "Si todos saben de ti" performed by Delia Díaz de Villegas, which was moderately successful making it to the top 10. The song was selected in a national final titled De La Habana a Acapulco. In 1992, 1993, and 1994 their participation was selected in a national final titled De La Habana a Valencia.

The best scoring Cuban entry came in 1995 with the song "Hoy que no estás" performed by Cristina Rebull, which came third in the festival. The following Cuban competing songs in the contest from 1996 to 2000 were also successful, managing again to reach the top 10. Due to the short trajectory of Cuba in the OTI Festival, the country never won or hosted the festival which came to an end in 2000.

== Participation overview ==
Table key
3	Third place
F	Finalist
◇	Contest cancelled

Year	Song	Artist	Songwriter(s)	Conductor	Place	Points
1991	"Si todos saben de ti"	Delia Díaz de Villegas	Rolando Ojeda	Miguel Patterson	F	—N/a
1992	"Sólo para mí"	Augusto Enríquez	Julián Fernández; Emilio Vega; Augusto Enríquez		—N/a	
1993	"Amor de miedo"	Manolo Sánchez	José Valladares	Guillermo Valverde	—N/a	
1994	"Amor y cadenas"	Osvaldo Rodríguez	Osvaldo Rodríguez	Guillermo Valverde	9	3
1995	"Hoy que no estás"	Cristina Rebull	Carlos Miguel Ojeda	Oscar Cardozo Ocampo	3	—N/a
1996	"Me queda la canción"	Eduardo Antonio	Eduardo Antonio	Claudio Jácome Harb	—N/a	
1997	"Golondrina"	Tania Tania	Samuel Concepción	Víctor Salazar	F	—N/a
1998	"Un sueño loco"	Osnel Odit Bavastro	Raúl E. Pérez de la Rosa	Álvaro Esquivel Valverde	F	—N/a
1999	Contest cancelled ◇					
2000	"Una vida nueva"	Indira Hernández	Leonel Viera López	Hernando Hernández	F	—N/a
