= Jackeline Estévez =

Jackeline Estévez (born February 7, 1963) is a female singer in the Dominican Republic. She was born in San Francisco de Macoris, Dominican Republic. She has been performing for more than 27 years and recently won the 2008 Casandra Award for best female artist. She represented the Dominican Republic in the OTI Festival 1991 with the song "Cuando el amor se va".
