= OTI Festival 1991 =

20th OTI Song Festival

Dates and venue
- Semi-final: 13 December 1991
- Final: 14 December 1991
- Venue: Salón Teotihuacán; Centro de Convenciones; Acapulco, Mexico

Organization
- Organizer: Organización de Televisión Iberoamericana (OTI)

Production
- Host broadcaster: Televisa
- Director: Alberto del Bosque
- Musical director: Chucho Ferrer
- Presenters: Semi-final: Eduardo Capetillo; Gloria Calzada; Rebecca de Alba; Final: Raúl Velasco

Participants
- Number of entries: 24
- Number of finalists: 10
- Debuting countries: Cuba
- Returning countries: Aruba; Bolivia; Canada
- Non-returning countries: Netherlands Antilles
- Participation map: Finalist countries Countries eliminated in the semi-final Countries that participated in the past but not in 1991

Vote
- Voting system: The members of a single jury selected their favourite songs in a secret vote
- Winning song: Argentina "¿Adónde estás ahora?"

The OTI Festival 1991 (Spanish: Vigésimo Gran Premio de la Canción Iberoamericana, Portuguese: Vigésimo Grande Prêmio da Canção Ibero-Americana) was the 20th edition of the OTI Festival. It consisted of a semi-final on 13 December, presented by Eduardo Capetillo, Gloria Calzada, and Rebecca de Alba, and a final on 14 December 1991, presented by Raúl Velasco, held at the Salón Teotihuacán of the Centro de Convenciones in Acapulco, Mexico. It was organised by the Organización de Televisión Iberoamericana (OTI) and host broadcaster Televisa.

Broadcasters from twenty-four countries participated in the festival. The winner was the song "¿Adónde estás ahora?", written by Claudia Brant and Sebastián Schon, and performed by Brant herself representing Argentina; with "Consejos, canción a mi hijo", written by Conrado Marrugo Vélez, and performed by Juan Carlos Coronel representing Colombia, placing second; and "Barrio viejo", written by Sergio Esquivel, and performed by Rodolfo Muñiz representing Mexico, placing third.

== Location ==
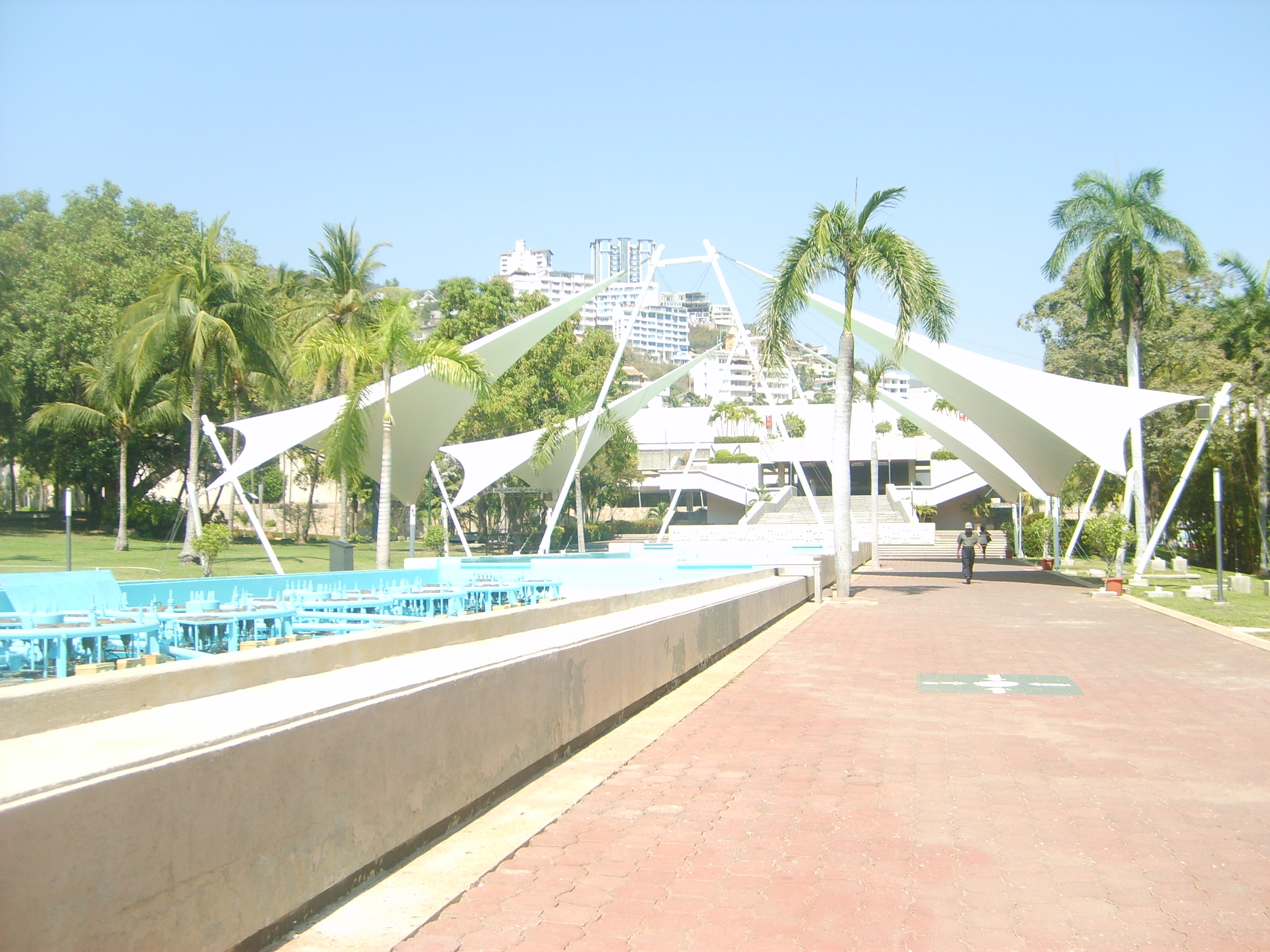
Centro de Convenciones, Acapulco – host venue of the OTI Festival 1991.

The Organización de Televisión Iberoamericana (OTI) designated Televisa as the host broadcaster for the 20th edition of the OTI Festival. The broadcaster staged the event in Acapulco. The venue selected was the Salón Teotihuacán of the Centro de Convenciones, which is a multipurpose hall with an area of 5,475 m^{2} (58,930 sq ft) within the convention and exhibition center.

== Participants ==
Broadcasters from twenty-four countries participated in this edition of the OTI Festival. The OTI members, public or private broadcasters from Spain, Portugal, and twenty-two Spanish and Portuguese speaking countries of Ibero-America signed up for the festival. From the countries that participated in the previous edition only the Netherlands Antilles was absent; with Aruba, Bolivia, and Canada returning; and Cuba participating for the first time.

Some of the participating broadcasters, such as those representing Argentina, Aruba, Chile, Cuba, Guatemala, Nicaragua, and the United States, selected their entries through their regular national televised competitions. Other broadcasters decided to select their entry internally.

Three performing artists had previously represented the same country in previous editions: Sergio Iván had represented Guatemala in 1981, Alberto Olivera had represented Canada in 1987, and Daniel Montero had represented Uruguay in 1988. In addition, Trío Huazteca representing Aruba had represented the Netherlands Antilles in 1978.

Participants of the OTI Festival 1991
Country	Broadcaster(s)	Song	Artist	Songwriter(s)	Language	Conductor
Argentina		"¿Adónde estás ahora?"	Claudia Brant	Claudia Brant; Sebastián Schon	Spanish	Chucho Ferrer
Aruba	TeleAruba	"Mi buena amiga"	Trío Huazteca	Etty Toppenberg	Spanish	Amado Rosina
Bolivia		"No eres ya tú"	Grupo Solocanto	Gastón González Aranibar; Huáscar Bolívar Vallejo	Spanish	César Scotta
Canada		"Si tu te vas"	Alberto Olivera	Alberto Olivera	Spanish	Chucho Ferrer
Chile	TVN; UCTV; RTU	"Haciendo música"	Claudio Escobar	Scottie Scott	Spanish	René Calderón
Colombia		"Consejos, canción a mi hijo"	Juan Carlos Coronel	Conrado Marrugo Vélez	Spanish	Chucho Ferrer
Costa Rica	Teletica	"Todos es para ti"	Angelus	Jose Alberto González Trueque; Jorge Castro Ruiz; Aldondo Castillo; Rodolfo González	Spanish	Jorge Castro Ruiz
Cuba	ICRT	"Si todos saben de ti"	Delia Díaz de Villegas	Rolando Ojeda	Spanish	Miguel Patterson
Dominican Republic		"Cuando el amor se va"	Jackeline Estévez	Anthony Ríos	Spanish	Chucho Ferrer
Ecuador		"Para escribir una canción"	Juan Carlos Córdova	Wálter Abril; Jimmy Árias	Spanish	Richard Anton
El Salvador	TCS	"Esta noche no"	Rosa María	Inés de Viaud	Spanish	Chucho Ferrer
Guatemala		"Yo quiero... yo puedo"	Sergio Iván	María Antonieta Gámez	Spanish	Carlos Soto
Honduras		"Sembrando cantos"	Max Jovel Argueta y Mauricio Medina	Mauricio Medina	Spanish	Alfonso Flores
Mexico	Televisa	"Barrio viejo"	Rodolfo Muñiz	Sergio Esquivel	Spanish	Chucho Ferrer
Nicaragua		"América en mis entrañas"	Martha Baltodano	Roger Fischer	Spanish	César Prado
Panama		"Océano y gaviota"	Juan Carlos Rodríguez y Loló Ledezma	Juan Carlos Rodríguez	Spanish	Chucho Ferrer
Paraguay		"Hoy ha vuelto el amor"	Adrián Barreto	Adrián Barreto	Spanish	Chucho Ferrer
Peru		"Enamorado de estar aquí"	Eva Ayllón y Fahed Mitre	Fahed Mitre; Miguel Figueroa	Spanish	Miguel Figueroa
Portugal	RTP	"Ao sul da América"	Dulce Pontes	Fred Micaelo; Zé da Ponte; Jorge Quintela	Portuguese	Thilo Krasmann
Puerto Rico	Telemundo Puerto Rico	"Nuestra voz"	José Juan Tañón	José Juan Tañón	Spanish	Ito Serrano
Spain	TVE	"Bésame"	Joel	Peret	Spanish	Alfredo Domenech
United States	Univision	"Qué poca fe"	Elsa Ozuna	Lucho Neves	Spanish	Lucho Neves
Uruguay	Sociedad Televisora Larrañaga	"Salvaje"	Daniel Mantero	Daniel Mantero	Spanish	Julio Frade
Venezuela		"Podría suceder"	Jesús Alfredo Ruiz	Jesús Alfredo Ruiz	Spanish	Chucho Ferrer

== Festival overview ==
The festival consisted for the first time of a semi-final on Friday 13 December and a final on Saturday 14 December 1991. The musical director was Chucho Ferrer, who conducted the orchestra, made up of professionals from the Single Union of Music Workers of Mexico, when required.

=== Semi-final ===
The semi-final was held on Friday 13 December 1991, beginning at 16:00 CST (22:00 UTC). It was presented by Eduardo Capetillo, Gloria Calzada, Rebecca de Alba. The presenters introduced each of the competing entries with a speech praising the country it represented. Each participating artist took the stage accompanied by a child dressed in a Mexican traditional costume carrying the flag of the participating country. The show featured several performances by a traditional Mexican folkloric ballet directed by Javier Arias and Alonso Navarrete.

The twenty-four participating entries were performed in the semi-final, of which only ten advanced to the final, with Mexico having a guaranteed place in the final as the host country. The qualifying songs were announced in order of performance, with the performer taking the stage and drawing a ball from an opaque bowl to determine the running order (R/O) in the final, with the exception of Mexico, which was announced last and took the remaining spot. Since Colombia was incorrectly assigned position six when it drew the ball nine, when Chile drew the ball six, it was assigned position nine.

Qualifier

Results of the semi-final of the OTI Festival 1991
R/O	Country	Song	Artist	Result
1	Peru	"Enamorado de estar aquí"	Eva Ayllón y Fahed Mitre	—N/a
2	Panama	"Océano y gaviota"	Juan Carlos Rodríguez y Loló Ledezma	—N/a
3	El Salvador	"Esta noche no"	Rosa María	—N/a
4	Paraguay	"Hoy ha vuelto el amor"	Adrián Barreto	—N/a
5	Colombia	"Consejos, canción a mi hijo"	Juan Carlos Coronel	Qualified
6	Honduras	"Sembrando cantos"	Max Jovel Argueta y Mauricio Medina	—N/a
7	Cuba	"Si todos saben de ti"	Delia Díaz de Villegas	Qualified
8	Canada	"Si tu te vas"	Alberto Olivera	Qualified
9	Costa Rica	"Todos es para ti"	Angelus	Qualified
10	Puerto Rico	"Nuestra voz"	José Juan Tañón	—N/a
11	Uruguay	"Salvaje"	Daniel Mantero	—N/a
12	Dominican Republic	"Cuando el amor se va"	Jackeline Estévez	—N/a
13	Ecuador	"Para escribir una canción"	Juan Carlos Córdova	—N/a
14	Mexico	"Barrio viejo"	Rodolfo Muñiz	Qualified
15	Spain	"Bésame"	Joel	Qualified
16	Bolivia	"No eres ya tú"	Grupo Solocanto	—N/a
17	Chile	"Haciendo música"	Claudio Escobar	Qualified
18	Argentina	"¿Adónde estás ahora?"	Claudia Brant	Qualified
19	Venezuela	"Podría suceder"	Jesús Alfredo Ruiz	—N/a
20	Portugal	"Ao sul da América"	Dulce Pontes	Qualified
21	Aruba	"Mi buena amiga"	Trío Huazteca	—N/a
22	Guatemala	"Yo quiero... yo puedo"	Sergio Iván	—N/a
23	United States	"Qué poca fe"	Elsa Ozuna	Qualified
24	Nicaragua	"América en mis entrañas"	Martha Baltodano	—N/a

=== Final ===
The final was held on Saturday 14 December 1991, beginning at 16:00 CST (22:00 UTC). It was presented by Raúl Velasco. Velasco had previously presented the festival in 1974, 1976, 1981, and 1984. The show featured guest performances by José Luis Perales, Yuri, and Magneto; and a medley of well-known songs performed by nine participants of the Mexican Youth Values Festival. (Note: Including Carlos Cuevas, Cristal, Magdalena Zárate, María de Jesús, Raúl Carballeda, Gabriela, and Carlos Estrada.)

The winner was the song "¿Adónde estás ahora?", written by Claudia Brant and Sebastián Schon, and performed by Brant herself representing Argentina; with "Consejos, canción a mi hijo", written by Conrado Marrugo Vélez, and performed by Juan Carlos Coronel representing Colombia, placing second; and "Barrio viejo", written by Sergio Esquivel, and performed by Rodolfo Muñiz representing Mexico, placing third. There were three medals, gold, silver and bronze, for the top three performers. The first prize was delivered by Guillermo Cañedo, president of OTI; the second prize by Óscar Gutiérrez, president of the OTI legal commission, and Nicanor González, president of the OTI programs committee; and the third prize by Eladio Lárez and Alfredo Escobar, members of the OTI programs committee. The first prize was endowed with a monetary amount of US$30,000, the second prize of US$20,000, and the third prize of US$10,000, to be distributed each 50% to the songwriter and 50% to the performer. The festival ended with a reprise of the winning entry.

Winner

Results of the final of the OTI Festival 1991
R/O	Country	Song	Artist	Place
1	Canada	"Si tu te vas"	Alberto Olivera	—N/a
2	Portugal	"Ao sul da América"	Dulce Pontes	—N/a
3	Cuba	"Si todos saben de ti"	Delia Díaz de Villegas	—N/a
4	Spain	"Bésame"	Joel	—N/a
5	United States	"Qué poca fe"	Elsa Ozuna	—N/a
6	Colombia	"Consejos, canción a mi hijo"	Juan Carlos Coronel	2
7	Mexico	"Barrio viejo"	Rodolfo Muñiz	3
8	Argentina	"¿Adónde estás ahora?"	Claudia Brant	1
9	Chile	"Haciendo música"	Claudio Escobar	—N/a
10	Costa Rica	"Todos es para ti"	Angelus	—N/a

=== Jury ===
The members of a single jury selected their favourite songs in a secret vote. In the final only the top three places were revealed. The members of the jury were:

- Simón Díaz – comedian
- Yuri – singer, represented Mexico in 1984
- Fernando Ubiergo – singer-songwriter, won the festival for Chile in 1984
- José Luis Perales – singer-songwriter
- Vikki Carr – singer
- Nelson Ned – singer-songwriter, wrote the entry representing Brazil in 1982

== Broadcast ==
The festival was broadcast in the 24 participating countries where the corresponding OTI member broadcasters relayed the contest through their networks after receiving it live via satellite.

Known details on the broadcasts in each country, including the specific broadcasting stations and commentators are shown in the tables below.

Broadcasters and commentators in participating countries
Country	Broadcaster	Channel(s)	Show(s)	Commentator(s)	Ref.
Aruba	TeleAruba		All shows (Note: Delayed broadcast at 20:00 AST (00:00+1 UTC))		
Costa Rica	Teletica	Canal 7	Final (Note: Delayed broadcast at 19:30 CST (01:30+1 UTC))		
Cuba	ICRT	Cubavisión	All shows (Note: Delayed broadcast by a few minutes.)	Soledad Delgado and Carlos Otero	
Mexico	Televisa	Canal 2	Final (Note: Delayed broadcast at 20:00 CST (02:00+1 UTC))		
Spain	TVE	La 2	All shows	José Luis Uribarri	
United States	Univision		All shows (Note: Delayed broadcast later those days by all Univision affiliates, each in their own time zone.)		
