= Malena Burke =

Cuban singer

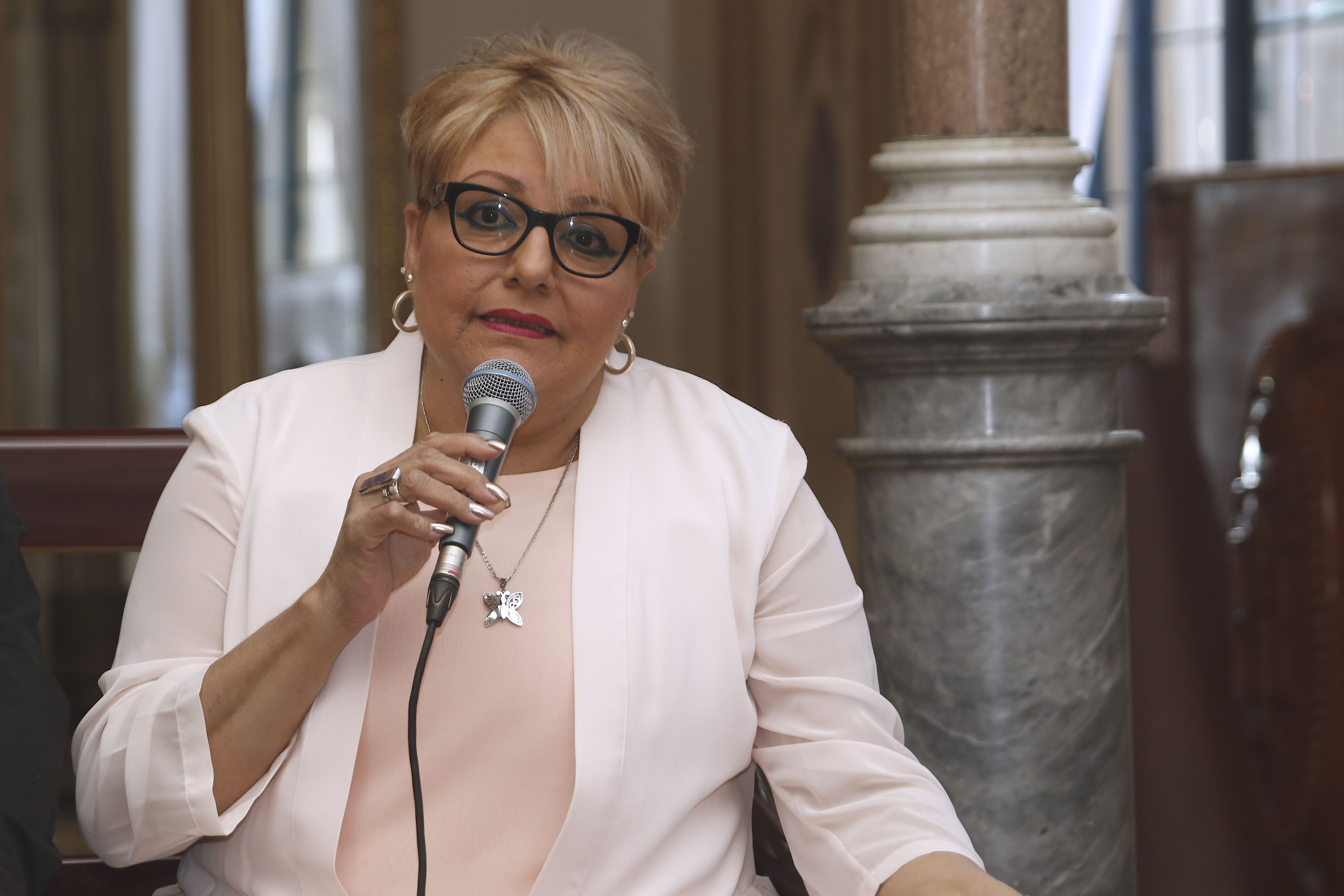
- Burke in 2018
- Born: September 15, 1958 (age 66); Havana, Cuba

Malena Burke (born September 15, 1958 in Havana, Cuba) is a well-known Cuban singer now living in Miami.

She began her musical studies at various art schools when she was only 8 years old and graduated from the Amadeo Roldan Conservatory with diplomas in violin, guitar, and musical writing. Her singing career developed by coincidence. Malena received her initial proposal to perform at the anniversary of the Casino Parisien, at the Hotel Nacional de Cuba, Havana's most distinguished hotel. She accepted and performed for the first time together with her mother, the legendary Cuban singer Elena Burke.

The following year, she was selected to perform as headliner at the Tropicana Club, where she continued as principal performer for five years. Burke proceeded to perform at the most acclaimed nightclubs in Havana, including the Hotel Habana Riviera, Havana Hilton and Capri showrooms. With her success also came demands for tours. She traveled to Argentina, Colombia, Mexico, Peru, Panama, Germany, Austria, Italy, Finland, Netherlands, and Venezuela, where she decided to stay in 1993. In Caracas, she performed continuously at many of the best places like EI Palacio del Mar, La Boite, The Seasons, and went to perform to other cities, including Valencia and Barquisimeto. She also participated in the "Algo Mas Que Boleros" and "Festival Internacional Boleros del Mar" music festivals.

In 1995, Burke came to the United States. Since then, she has performed at, among others, Centro Vasco, Yuca, Tropigala, La Taberna, Hoy Como Ayer, El Clique, etc. She has been to New York City, Puerto Rico, Los Angeles, Dominican Republic and Venezuela to participate in festivals and concerts. Malena has recorded "Salseando", "Cuba on Fire", "Malena Burke", "Super Cuban All Stars", "Bolero Jazz: Misty", "A Solas Contigo" vol. I & II, "Contigo en la Distancia", and "Malena Total".

She has four children, twins Flavia and Dulena, Osmel and the singer Lena.
