= Teatro Principal de València =

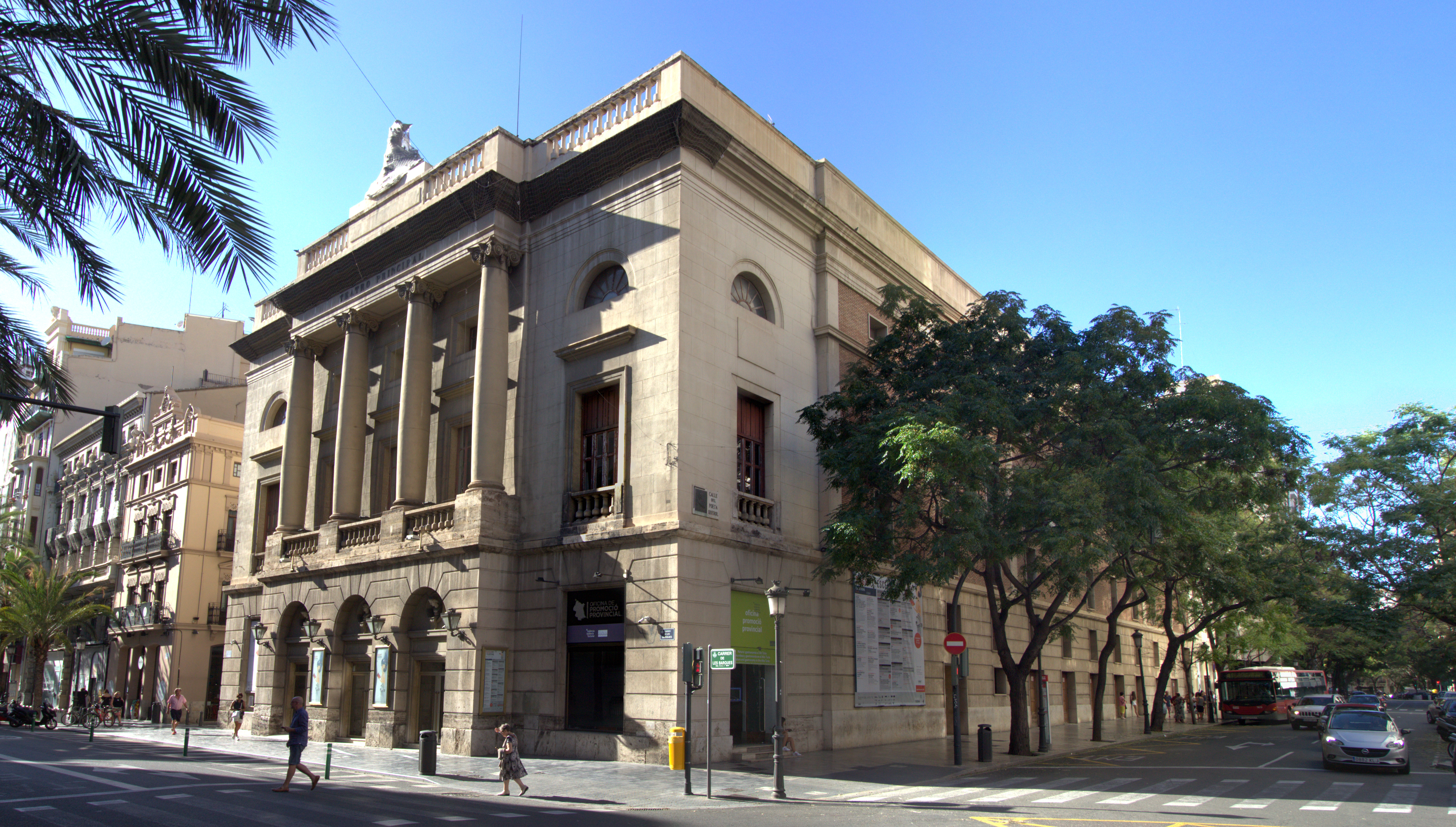
The Teatro Principal in September 2018

The Teatro Principal de València (Valencian: Teatre Principal), meaning Main Theatre of València, is a theatre in Valencia, Spain. It is located in downtown Carrer de les Barques (meaning Boats Street), close from the City Hall, as well as the Northern Station and the adjacent Bullring.

== Background ==
The Principal is the oldest surviving theatre in the city and predates national hallmarks such as Madrid's Teatro Real and Barcelona's Liceu. Valencia's former main theatre, the Corral de las Comedias de la Olivera, had been demolished when theatrical stagings were banned for moral issues, but after they were resumed following a 1760 Royal Decree by Charles III the construction of a new main theatre was sealed in 1774.

== Construction ==
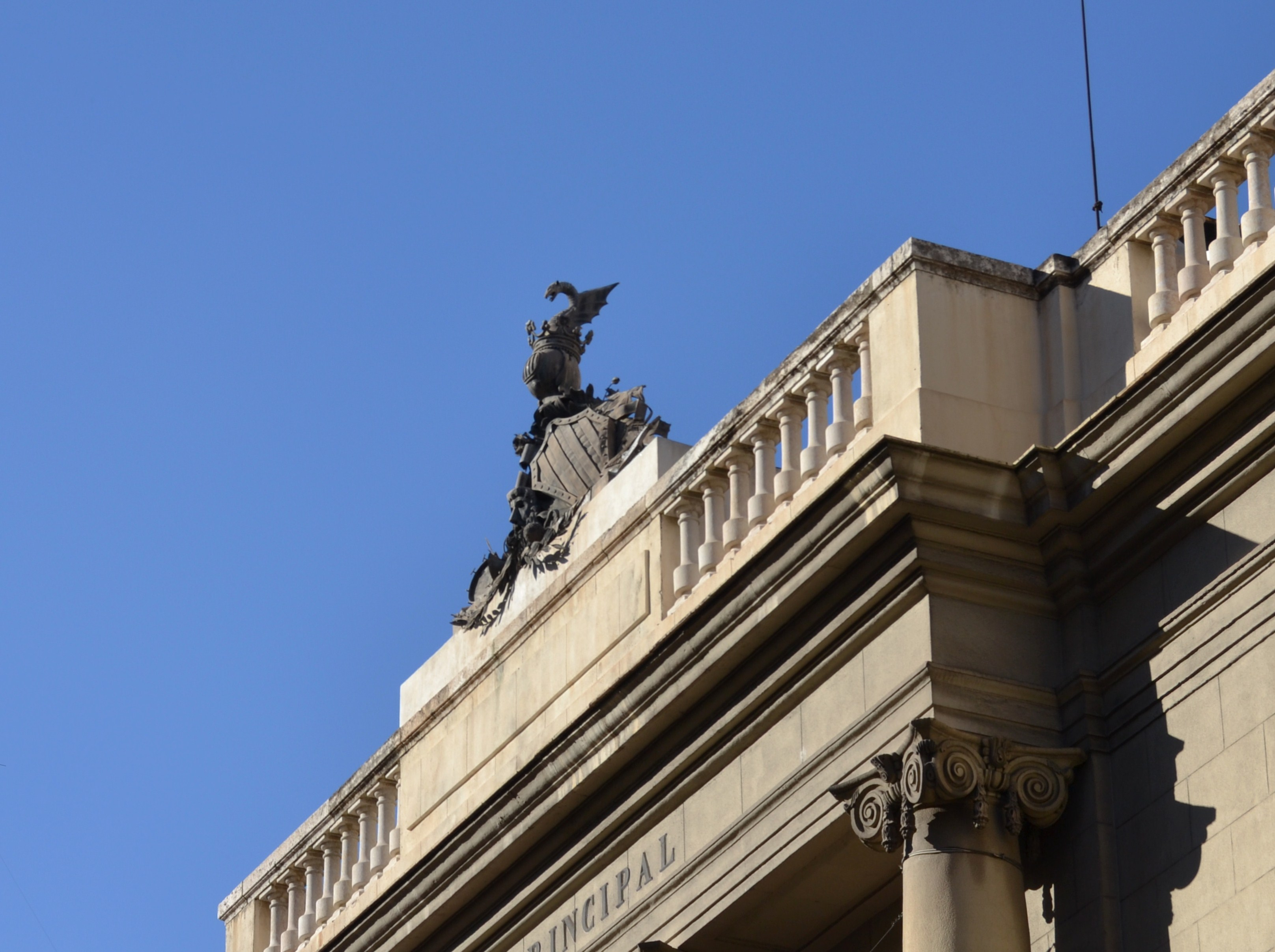
The theatre's roof features the coat of arms of the Valencian Community

The building was originally designed by Filippo Fontana, but the construction actually didn't start until January 1808, years after Fontana's death, on a redesign of his plans by Cristóbal Sales. But the work on the building was halted the following year because of the Peninsular War and the construction wasn't resumed following the end of the war in 1814. The site's framework was used for a while as a cockfight arena.

The construction was suddenly resumed in 1831 under architect Juan Marzo, who redesigned again the maps, turning it into a three-story building instead of the four originally planned. The theatre was rapidly built and opened on July 24, 1832 with an inaugural staging that included the second act of Giacomo Rossini's La Cenerentola. The inside was remodeled in 1845 by Sebastián Monleón, who created the city's bullring years later, and the current facade was added by José Zacarías in 1854.

== Use ==
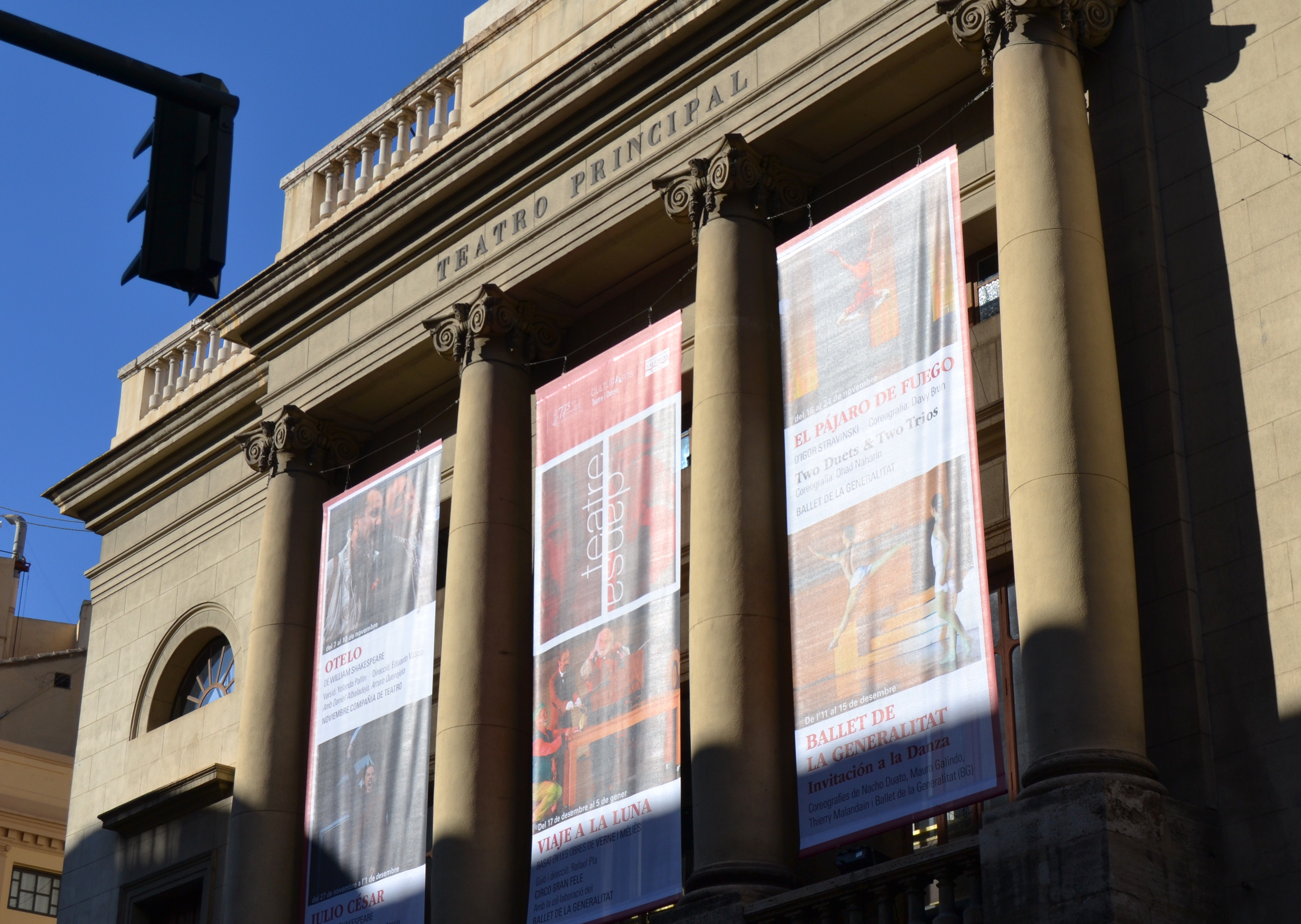
Detail of the theatre's facade featuring the Autumn 2013 schedule, including Othello, Julius Caesar and The Firebird.

=== Opera ===
Operas and zarzuelas such as respectively Manuel Penella's El gato montés and José Serrano's La venta de los gatos were first performed in the Principal.

Despite the 1987 transfer of the Valencia Orchestra to the Palau de la Música, the Principal remained the main venue for staged opera until the Palau de les Arts opened in 2005, and while the orchestra performed opera mostly as concert music until then in the Palau de la Música, it returned to the Teatro Principal for the premiere of local operas such as Amando Blanquer's El triomf de Tirant in 1992.

=== Orchestral music ===
The Valencia Orchestra performed regularly in the Teatro Principal from its creation in 1943 as the city lacked a concert hall, with most touring orchestras choosing to perform in the music hall of Llíria's Music Society, 25 km northwest of Valencia. When the Palau de la Música opened in 1987 the orchestra moved there.

The Palau de la Música was temporarily closed in July 2019 after part of the secondary hall's ceiling collapsed, and with the repairs expanded by a technical report and delayed until 2022, the Principal has since become provisionally the Valencia Orchestra's main venue once again.

=== Piano music ===
Franz Liszt gave three concerts in the Teatro Principal in March 1845 during the international tour the undertook in order to defray Ludwig van Beethoven's statue in Bonn.

The José Iturbi Piano Prize was held in the Principal from its creation in 1981. Thirteen editions were held in the theatre until the competition was moved to the Palau de la Música in 2004. Following the temporary closing of the latter the competition returned to the Principal for the 2021 edition.

=== Pop-Rock ===
The concert that launched Nino Bravo's career took place in the Teatro Principal in March 1969.

Televisión Española (TVE) staged at the theatre the 21st, 22nd, and 23rd editions of the OTI Festival on 5 December 1992, 9 October 1993, and 14–15 October 1994 respectively. The festivals were transmitted live via satellite to the member broadcasters of the Organización de Televisión Iberoamericana (OTI), which broadcast them in their countries.
