= List of Lollapalooza lineups by year =

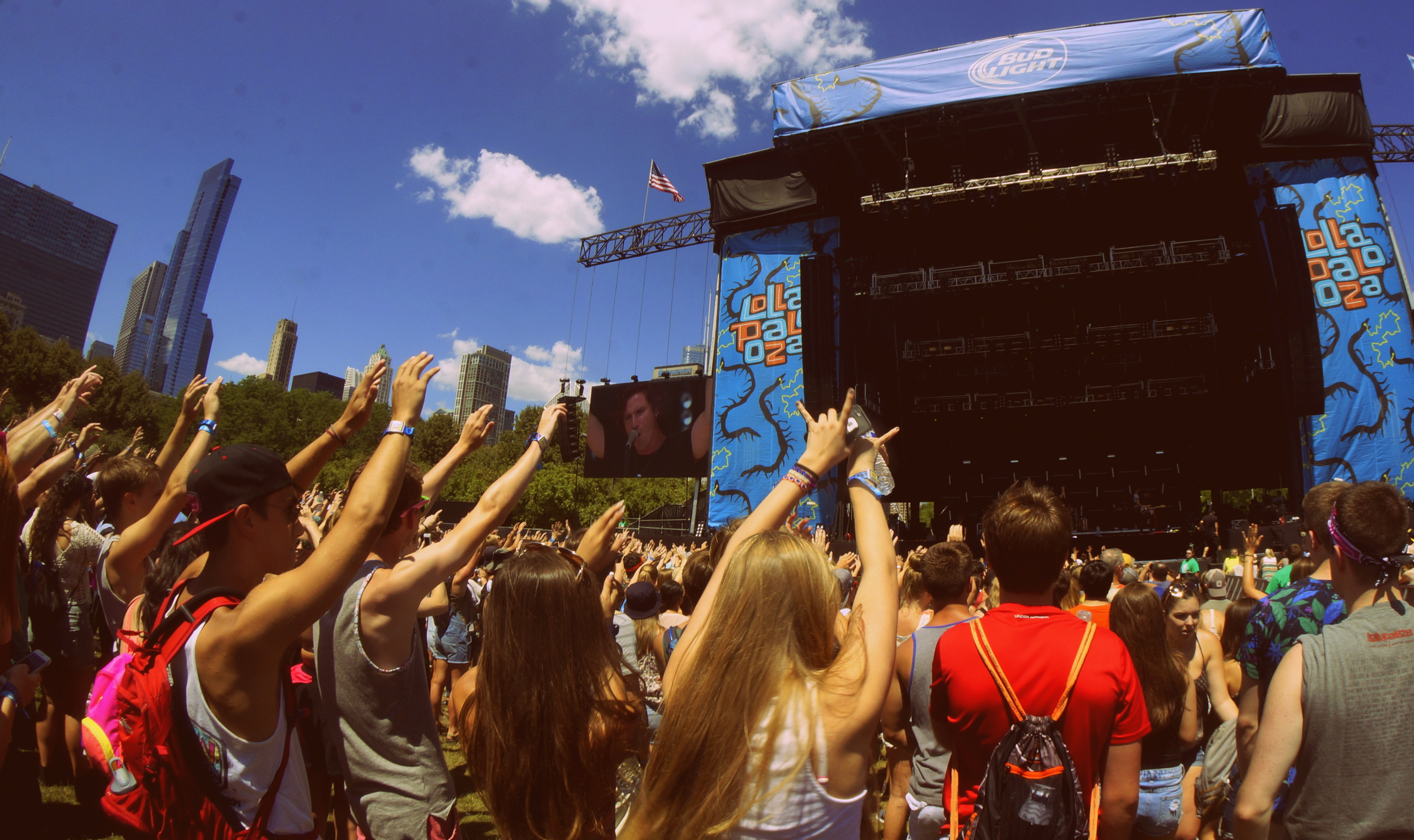
Bud Light Stage during the 2015 festival in Chicago

This is a list of Lollapalooza lineups, sorted by year. Lollapalooza was an annual travelling music festival organized from 1991 to 1997 by Jane's Addiction singer Perry Farrell. The concept was revived in 2003, but was cancelled in 2004. From 2005 onward, the concert has taken place almost exclusively at Grant Park, Chicago, and has played in Chile, Brazil, Argentina, Germany, France, and India.

== Line-ups ==
All information taken from various sources.

=== 1991 ===
Location: North America

Date	City	Country	Venue	Attendance	Gross	Source
July 18	Tempe, Arizona	United States	Compton Terrace			
July 20	Chula Vista, California	United States	Southwestern College			
July 21	Irvine, California	United States	Irvine Meadows Amphitheatre	41,703 / 45,000	$1,051,378	
July 23	Irvine, California	United States	Irvine Meadows Amphitheatre	41,703 / 45,000	$1,051,378	
July 24	Irvine, California	United States	Irvine Meadows Amphitheatre	41,703 / 45,000	$1,051,378	
July 26	Mountain View, California	United States	Shoreline Amphitheatre	35,048 / 35,048	$771,286	
July 27	Mountain View, California	United States	Shoreline Amphitheatre	35,048 / 35,048	$771,286	
July 30	Bonner Springs, Kansas	United States	Sandstone Amphitheater			
August 1	Saint Paul, Minnesota	United States	Harriet Island	17,138 / 17,138	$431,833	
August 3	Tinley Park, Illinois	United States	World Music Theater	30,152 / 30,152	$654,060	
August 4	Clarkston, Michigan	United States	Pine Knob Music Theatre	15,135 / 15,135	$349,346	
August 5	Cuyahoga Falls, Ohio	United States	Blossom Music Center			
August 7	Toronto, Ontario	Canada	Exhibition Stadium			
August 9	Mansfield, Massachusetts	United States	Great Woods Amphitheater			
August 10	Mansfield, Massachusetts	United States	Great Woods Amphitheater			
August 11	Stanhope, New Jersey	United States	Waterloo Village	-	-	
August 13	Saratoga Springs, New York	United States	Saratoga Performing Arts Center			
August 14	Stanhope, New Jersey	United States	Waterloo Village	29,020 / 30,000	$638,007	
August 16	Reston, Virginia	United States	Lake Fairfax Park	21,580 / 21,580	$636,610	
August 17	Raleigh, North Carolina	United States	Walnut Creek Amphitheater	19,494 / 20,000	$401,284	
August 18	Atlanta, Georgia	United States	Coca-Cola Lakewood Amphitheater			
August 20	Orlando, Florida	United States	Central Florida Fairgrounds	27,665 / 27,665	$613,874	
August 22	Dallas, Texas	United States	Coca-Cola Starplex Amphitheater	30,019 / 40,000	$661,747	
August 23	Dallas, Texas	United States	Coca-Cola Starplex Amphitheater	30,019 / 40,000	$661,747	
August 25	Greenwood Village, Colorado	United States	Fiddler's Green Amphitheatre			
August 28	Enumclaw, Washington	United States	King County Fairgrounds			
				266,954 / 281,718 (95%)	$6,209,425	

Main Stage:

- Jane's Addiction
- Siouxsie and the Banshees
- Living Colour
- Nine Inch Nails
- Ice-T & Body Count
- Butthole Surfers
- Rollins Band
- Violent Femmes (August 23, Dallas, August 25, Denver, and August 28, Seattle only)
- Fishbone (August 22, Dallas and August 28, Seattle only)

Side Stage:

- Othello's Revenge (Mountain View at Shoreline Amphitheater)
- Emergency Broadcast Network

Nine Inch Nails concluded the tour on August 20 in Orlando. Their slot on the bill was filled by Violent Femmes or Fishbone for the remainder of the tour. For the final show in Enumclaw, WA, along with NIN, Living Colour did not play either. Both Violent Femmes and Fishbone performed instead.

Gang of Four was originally announced as part of the lineup but they never ended up appearing.

=== 1992 ===
Location: North America

Dates: July 18 – September 13, 1992

- Shoreline Amphitheater, Mountain View, CA (July 18 & 19, 1992)
- UBC Thunderbird Stadium, Vancouver, BC, Canada (July 21, 1992)
- Kitsap County Fairgrounds, Bremerton, WA (July 22, 1992)
- Fiddler's Green Amphitheater, Denver, CO (July 25, 1992)
- Riverport Amphitheater, Maryland Heights, MO (July 27, 1992)
- Riverbend Amphitheater, Cincinnati, OH (July 28, 1992)
- Blossom Music Center, Cuyahoga Falls, OH (July 29, 1992)
- Pine Knob Music Theatre, Clarkston, MI (July 31 & August 1, 1992)
- World Music Theater, Tinley Park, IL (August 2, 1992)
- Saratoga Performing Arts Center, Saratoga Springs, NY (August 4, 1992)
- Molson Park, Barrie, ON, Canada (August 5, 1992)
- Great Woods, Mansfield, MA (August 7 & 8, 1992)
- Jones Beach Amphitheater, Wantagh, NY (August 9 & 11, 1992)
- Waterloo Village, Stanhope, NJ (August 12, 1992)
- Lake Fairfax, Reston, VA (August 14, 1992)
- Montage Mountain Performing Arts Center, Scranton, PA (August 15, 1992)
- Coca-Cola Starlake Amphitheatre, Burgettstown, PA (August 16, 1992)
- Hardee's Walnut Creek Amphitheater, Raleigh, NC (August 18, 1992)
- Lakewood Amphitheatre, Atlanta, GA (August 20, 1992)
- Bicentennial Park, Miami, FL (August 22, 1992)
- Central Florida Fairgrounds, Orlando, FL (August 23, 1992)
- Blockbuster Pavilion, Charlotte, NC (August 25, 1992)
- Harriet Island, St Paul, MN (August 28, 1992)
- Alpine Valley Music Theater, East Troy, WI (August 29, 1992)
- Lakewood Amphitheatre, Atlanta, GA (September 1, 1992)
- University of New Orleans, New Orleans, LA (September 4, 1992)
- Fort Bend County Fairgrounds, Rosenberg, TX (September 5, 1992)
- Starplex Amphitheater, Dallas, TX (September 6, 1992)
- Desert Sky Pavilion, Phoenix, AZ (September 8, 1992)
- Irvine Meadows Amphitheater, Irvine, CA (September 11, 12 & 13, 1992)

Most of the August 11 show at the Jones Beach Amphitheater was cancelled due to inclement weather.

Main Stage:

- Red Hot Chili Peppers
- Ministry
- Ice Cube
- Soundgarden
- The Jesus and Mary Chain
- Pearl Jam
- Lush

Side Stage:

- Jim Rose Circus Sideshow
- Archie Bell's Future Kulture dancers
- Sharkbait
- Boo-Yaa T.R.I.B.E.
- Bronx Style Bob (July 28 – August 11)
- Porno for Pyros (July 18, Mountainview, CA, September 4, New Orleans, LA, September 13, Irvine, CA)
- House Of Pain (July 18, Mountainview, CA)
- Cypress Hill (July 18, 19 Mountainview, CA, August 9, Wantagh, NY, September 13, Irvine, CA)
- Dead Surf Kiss (July 21, Vancouver, BC)
- Itch (July 21, Vancouver, BC)
- Mystery Machine (July 21, Vancouver, BC)
- Truly (July 22, Bremerton, WA)
- Sweaty Nipples (July 22, Bremerton, WA)
- Hitting Birth (July 22, Bremerton, WA)
- Arson Garden (July 28, Cincinnati, OH)
- The Vulgar Boatmen (July 28, Cincinnati, OH)
- BuBu Klan (July 28, Cincinnati, OH)
- Hannibals (July 31, Clarkston, MI)
- Thought Industry (July 31, Clarkston, MI)
- Enemy Squad (August 1, Clarkston, MI)
- Seam (August 1, Clarkston, MI)
- The Look People (August 5, Barrie, ON)
- Jesus Christ Superstar (August 5, Barrie, ON)
- Come (August 7, 8, Mansfield, MA)
- Green Magnet School (August 7, Mansfield, MA)
- Tribe (August 7, Mansfield, MA)
- Opium Den (August 8, Mansfield, MA)
- The Aquanettas (August 9, Wantagh, NY)
- Wisdom Tooth (August 11, Wantagh, NY)
- Nudeswirl (August 12, Stanhope NJ, August 15, Scranton, PA)
- Drunken Boat (August 12, Stanhope NJ)
- The Authority (August 12, Stanhope NJ)
- Rubber Uglies (August 14, Reston, VA)
- Sweet Lizard Illtet (August 15, Scranton, PA)
- Dead Letters (August 15, Scranton, PA)
- Left Wing Fascists (August 18, Raleigh, NC)
- Toxic Popsicle (August 18, Raleigh, NC)
- Billyclub Fest (August 18, Raleigh, NC)
- Basehead (August 20–25)
- Follow For Now (August 20, Atlanta, GA)
- Asa Nisi Masa (August 20, Atlanta, GA)
- Skin Tight (August 22, Miami, FL)
- Barking Tribe (August 22, Miami, FL)
- Strange As Angels (August 22, Miami, FL)
- Genitorturers (August 23, Orlando, FL)
- Blackcats and Bottlerockets (August 23, Orlando, FL)
- Rein Sanction (August 23, Orlando, FL)
- God's Water (August 25, Charlotte, NC)
- Sex Police (August 25, Charlotte, NC)
- Dahli Llama (August 25, Charlotte, NC)
- Cows (August 28, St Paul, MN)
- Zuzu's Petals (August 28, St Paul, MN)
- Big Hat (August 29, East Troy, WI)
- Big Sky (September 1, Atlanta, GA)
- Shrunken Head (September 1, Atlanta, GA)
- Big Fish Ensemble (September 1, Atlanta, GA)
- Duckhills (September 5, Rosenberg, TX)
- Pork (September 5, Rosenberg, TX)
- Skrew (September 6, Dallas, TX)
- Stone Temple Pilots (September 8, Phoenix, AZ, September 12, Irvine, CA)
- Temple of the Dog (September 8, Phoenix, AZ)
- Chalk Circle (September 8, Phoenix, AZ)
- B.Strange (September 8, Phoenix, AZ)
- Chris Cacavas & Junkyard Love (September 8, Phoenix, AZ)
- Rage Against the Machine (September 11, 12, Irvine, CA)
- Café Tacuba (September 11, Irvine, CA)
- Pigmy Love Circus (September 12, Irvine, CA)
- Failure (September 12, Irvine, CA)
- Samba Hell (September 13, Irvine, CA)
- Slot
- Chris Chandler
- Our American Cousins
- Wax
- Gun Cult Prophets
- Bleed (SF) (Mountain View, CA and Irvine Meadows, CA)

=== 1993 ===
Location: North America

Dates: June 18 – August 7, 1993

Itinerary:

- Thunderbird Stadium, Vancouver, BC (June 18, 1993)
- The Gorge Amphitheater, George, WA (June 19, 1993)
- Portland Meadows, Portland, OR (June 20, 1993)
- Shoreline Amphitheatre, Mountain View, CA (June 22 & 23, 1993)
- Weber County Fairgrounds, Ogden, UT (June 25, 1993)
- Fiddlers Green Amphitheatre, Greenwood Village, CO (June 26, 1993)
- Iowa State Fairgrounds, Des Moines, IA (June 28, 1993)
- St. Paul Civic Center, St. Paul, MN (June 29, 1993)
- Riverport Amphitheatre, Maryland Heights, MO (July 1, 1993)
- World Music Theatre, Tinley Park, IL (July 2 & 3, 1993)
- Deer Creek Music Center, Noblesville, IN (July 5, 1993)
- Starwood Amphitheatre, Antioch, TN (July 6, 1993)
- Buckeye Lake Music Center, Thornville, OH (July 8, 1993)
- Milan Dragway, Milan, MI (July 9, 1993)
- Molson Park, Barrie, ON (July 10, 1993)
- Waterloo VIllage, Stanhope, NJ (July 12, 13 & 16, 1993)
- Quonset State Airport, Kingston, RI (July 17, 1993)
- JFK Stadium Site, Philadelphia, PA (July 18, 1993)
- Charles Town Race Track, Ranson, WV (July 20, 1993)
- Coca-Cola Star Lake Amphitheatre, Burgettstown, PA (July 21, 1993)
- Hardee's Walnut Creek Amphitheater, Raleigh, NC (July 23, 1993)
- Metrolina Expo Trade Center, Charlotte, NC (July 24, 1993)
- Lakewood Amphitheatre, Atlanta, GA (July 25, 1993)
- Central Florida Fairgrounds, Orlando, FL (July 28, 1993)
- University of New Orleans, New Orleans, LA (July 30, 1993)
- Raceway Park, Baytown, TX (July 31, 1993)
- Starplex Amphitheater, Dallas, TX (August 1, 1993)
- Compton Terrace, Chandler, AZ (August 4, 1993)
- Sante Fe Dam Recreational Area, Irwindale, CA (August 6 & 7, 1993)

Main Stage:

- Alice in Chains
- Primus
- Dinosaur Jr.
- Fishbone
- Arrested Development
- Front 242
- Babes in Toyland (June 18 – July 13)
- Tool (July 16 – August 7)
- Rage Against the Machine

Side Stage:

- Tool (June 18 – July 13)
- Mercury Rev (June 18 – June 29)
- Mutabaruka (June 18 – June 29)
- Unrest (July 1 – July 13)
- A Lighter Shade of Brown (July 1 – July 6)
- Royal Trux (July 10 – July 18)
- Cell (July 16 – July 28)
- Mosquito (July 20 – July 28)
- Sebadoh (July 30 – August 7)
- Tsunami (July 30 – August 7)
- Free Kitten (July 30 – August 7)
- Thurston Moore (July 30 – August 7)
- Truly (June 18, Vancouver)
- Hazel (June 19, George WA)
- Kill Sybil (June 20, Portland)
- Charlie Hunter Trio (June 22, San Francisco)
- 10 Bass T (June 23, San Francisco)
- Bash & Pop (June 25, 26, Salt Lake City, Denver)
- Ritual Device (June 28, Des Moines)
- Janitor Joe (June 29, St. Paul)
- Vulgar Boatmen (July 1, St. Louis)
- Red Red Meat (July 2, Chicago)
- Catherine (July 3, Chicago)
- Antenna (July 5, Indianapolis)
- Lambchop (July 6, Nashville)
- Scrawl (July 8, Columbus)
- The Coctails (July 8, Columbus, July 9, Detroit)
- Paul K and the Weathermen (July 9, Detroit)
- Fifth Column (July 10, Barrie ON)
- Verve (July 12, 13, Stanhope NJ)
- Luscious Jackson (July 16, Stanhope NJ)
- Drop Nineteens (July 16, Stanhope NJ)
- Combustible Edison (July 17, Providence)
- Swirlies (July 17, Providence)
- The Goats (July 18, Philadelphia)
- Sleepyhead (July 18, Philadelphia)
- Eggs (July 20, Charles Town WV)
- Girls Against Boys (July 20, Charles Town WV)
- The Karl Hendricks Trio (July 21, Pittsburgh)
- Hurl (July 21, Pittsburgh)
- Small (July 23, Raleigh)
- Archers of Loaf (July 23, Raleigh)
- Vanilla Trainwreck (July 24, Charlotte)
- Motorolla (July 24, Charlotte)
- The Daisy Group (July 25, Atlanta)
- Moving Targets (July 25, Atlanta)
- Crowsdell (July 28, Orlando)
- Naiomi's Hair (July 28, Orlando)
- Glue (July 31, August 1, Houston, Dallas)
- Brothers Grimm (August 4, Phoenix)
- Ethyl Meatplow (August 6, Los Angeles)
- Blue Dog Love (August 6, Los Angeles)
- Dos (August 6, 7, Los Angeles)
- DFL (August 7, Los Angeles)
- Universal Congress Of (August 7, Los Angeles)
- The Runties (Puppet Show most dates)

=== 1994 ===
Location: North America

Dates: July 7, 1994 – September 5, 1994

- Sam Boyd Stadium, Las Vegas, NV (July 7, 1994)
- Fiddlers Green Amphitheatre, Greenwood Village, CO (July 9, 1994)
- Sandstone Amphitheater, Bonner Springs, KS (July 11, 1994)
- Harriet Island, St. Paul, MN (July 12, 1994)
- Marcus Amphitheater, Milwaukee, WI (July 14, 1994)
- World Music Theater, Tinley Park, IL (July 15 & 16, 1994)
- Riverport Amphitheatre, Maryland Heights, MO (July 17, 1994)
- Polaris Amphitheater, Columbus, OH (July 19, 1994)
- Riverbend Music Center, Cincinnati, OH (July 20, 1994)
- Deer Creek Music Center, Noblesville, IN (July 22, 1994)
- Pine Knob Amphitheatre, Clarkston, MI (July 23, 24 & 25, 1994)
- Le Parc des Iles, Montréal, QC (July 27, 1994)
- Molson Park, Barrie, ON (July 28, 1994)
- Pine Knob Amphitheatre, Clarkston, MI (July 29, 1994)
- Starlake Amphitheater, Burgettstown, PA (July 30, 1994)
- FDR Park, Philadelphia, PA (August 1, 1994)
- Saratoga Raceway, Saratoga Springs, NY (August 2, 1994)
- Quonset State Airport, North Kingstown, RI (August 3, 1994)
- Downing Stadium at Randall's Island, New York, NY (August 5 & 6, 1994)
- Charles Town Races, Charles Town, WV (August 8, 1994)
- Walnut Creek Amphitheater, Raleigh, NC (August 10, 1994)
- Blockbuster Pavilion, Charlotte, NC (August 11, 1994)
- Lakewood Amphitheater, Atlanta, GA (August 12 & 13, 1994)
- Bicentennial Park, Miami, FL (August 15, 1994)
- University of New Orleans Soccer Field, New Orleans, LA (August 18, 1994)
- Houston Raceway Park, Houston, TX (August 19, 1994)
- Starplex Amphitheatre, Dallas, TX (August 20 & 21, 1994)
- Desert Sky Pavilion, Phoenix, AZ (August 24, 1994)
- San Diego State University Aztec Bowl, San Diego, CA (August 25, 1994)
- Shoreline Amphitheatre, Mountain View, CA (August 27 & 28, 1994)
- Cloverdale Raceway, Surrey, BC (August 30, 1994)
- Gorge Amphitheatre, George, WA (August 31 & September 1, 1994)
- Velodrome Field, Cal State Dominguez Hills, Carson, CA (September 4 & 5, 1994)

Main Stage:

- Smashing Pumpkins
- Beastie Boys
- George Clinton & the P-Funk All Stars
- The Breeders
- A Tribe Called Quest
- Nick Cave and the Bad Seeds
- L7
- Boredoms (July 7 – August 3)
- Green Day (August 5 – September 5)

Side Stage:

- The Flaming Lips (July 7 – August 5)
- The Verve (July 7 – August 5)
- Rollerskate Skinny (July 7 – July 16)
- The Frogs (July 7 – July 15)
- Luscious Jackson (July 9 – August 5)
- Palace Songs (July 16 – August 5)
- Guided by Voices (July 16 – July 24)
- Girls Against Boys (July 25 – August 5)
- Stereolab (August 6 – September 5)
- Charlie Hunter Trio (August 6 – August 18)
- Fu-Schnickens (August 6 – August 11)
- Blast Off Country Style (August 6 – August 11)
- Lambchop (August 6 – August 11)
- The Boo Radleys (August 12 – September 5)
- Shudder to Think (August 12 – September 5)
- King Kong (August 12 – August 18)
- The Pharcyde (August 19 – September 5)
- Shonen Knife (August 19 – September 5)
- The Black Crowes (August 12, Atlanta, GA)
- Maggie Estep (August 27, Mountain View, CA)
- Green Day (August 31, George, WA)
- Cypress Hill (September 4, Carson, CA)

- From the Main Stage, Smashing Pumpkins, The Breeders, Nick Cave, L7, Boredoms and Green Day (George, WA) all made various appearances on the Second Stage at some point.

Juliette Torrez, a poet and promoter from New Mexico, organized the poetry offerings. Angelo Moore (aka Dr. Madd Vibe) and members of Fishbone performed in the poetry tent with the Beastie Boys at the Shoreline show in CA. Poet Thomas R. Peters, Jr. read poetry on all three stages at the Denver show, and poet Jason Stoneking also performed a poem on the Denver main stage. Poet Tracie Morris, among others, was hired by Lollapalooza to perform in the spoken word tent for the New York to Texas leg of the tour. The poetry tent was actually called "The Revival Tent" at the time. The Flaming Lips performed in The Revival Tent in Denver, going so far as dragging an upright acoustic piano across 100 yards of grass to do so.

Several of the artists, including Green Day and Cypress Hill, skipped at least one Lollapalooza date to appear at Woodstock '94 instead. Green Day was removed from stage at the performance at Walnut Creek Amphitheater in Raleigh, NC for encouraging general admission audience members to rush the stage and overwhelm the reserved seating area. Nirvana was scheduled to headline but officially pulled out on April 4, 1994, amid rumors that the band was on the verge of breaking up. Frontman Kurt Cobain was found dead in Seattle, Washington four days later on April 8, 1994. Cobain's widow, Courtney Love, made surprise guest appearances at several shows, speaking to the crowds about the loss. In New York, she greeted the crowd with "Hello, Generation Ecch!", a reference to Jason Cohen and Michael Krugman's Generation Ecch!: the Backlash Starts Here (Prentice Hall & IBD, 1994). Having met the authors at a party, she deemed the book hilarious, saying, "Kurt would have loved the mean stuff."

=== 1995 ===
Location: North America

Dates: July 4, 1995 – August 18, 1995

- The Gorge Amphitheater, George, WA (July 4, 1995)
- Thunderbird Stadium, Vancouver, BC (July 5, 1995)
- Fiddlers Green Amphitheatre, Greenwood Village, CO (July 8, 1995)
- Sandstone Amphitheatre, Bonner Springs, KS (July 10, 1995)
- Riverport Amphitheatre, Maryland Heights, MO (July 11, 1995)
- Deer Creek Music Center, Noblesville, IN (July 12, 1995)
- Polaris Amphitheater, Columbus, OH (July 14, 1995)
- New World Music Theatre, Tinley Park, IL (July 15, 1995)
- Riverbend Music Center, Cincinnati, OH (July 18, 1995)
- Pine Knob Music Theatre, Clarkston, MI (July 19 & 20, 1995)
- Blossom Music Center, Cuyahoga Falls, OH (July 22, 1995)
- Molson Park, Barrie, ON (July 23, 1995)
- Great Woods Center for the Performing Arts, Mansfield, MA (July 25, 1995)
- Meadows Music Theater, Hartford, CT (July 26, 1995)
- Downing Stadium, New York, NY (July 28 & 29, 1995)
- Blockbuster-Sony Music Entertainment Centre, Camden, NJ (July 30, 1995)
- Coca-Cola Star Lake Amphitheatre, Burgettstown, PA (July 31, 1995)
- Charles Town Race Track, Ranson, WV (August 3, 1995)
- Coca-Cola Lakewood Amphitheatre, Atlanta, GA (August 5, 1995)
- Hardee's Walnut Creek Amphitheater, Raleigh, NC (August 6, 1995)
- South Park Meadows, Austin, TX (August 9, 1995)
- Coca-Cola Starplex Amphitheater, Dallas, TX (August 10, 1995)
- Blockbuster Desert Sky Pavilion, Phoenix, AZ (August 12, 1995)
- Irvine Meadows Amphitheatre, Irvine, CA (August 14 & 15, 1995)
- Cal Expo Amphitheatre, Sacramento, CA (August 17, 1995)
- Shoreline Amphitheatre, Mountain View, CA (August 18, 1995)

Main Stage:

- Sonic Youth
- Hole
- Cypress Hill
- Pavement
- Sinéad O'Connor (July 4 – July 15; bowed out due to pregnancy)
- Elastica (July 23 – August 3, August 10 – August 18; replaced Sinéad O'Connor)
- Superchunk (August 5; subbing for Elastica)
- Moby (August 6 – August 9; subbing for Elastica)
- Beck
- The Jesus Lizard
- The Mighty Mighty Bosstones

Side Stage:

- Coolio (July 4 – July 19)
- Yo La Tengo (July 4 – July 19)
- Doo Rag (July 4 – July 13)
- Possum Dixon (July 4 – July 13)
- Poster Children (July 4 – July 13)
- Brainiac (July 14 – July 19)
- The Coctails (July 14 – July 23)
- Geraldine Fibbers (July 14 – July 28)
- The Dambuilders (July 20 – July 28)
- Laika (July 20 – July 28)
- The Pharcyde (July 20 – July 28)
- Moby (July 18 – July 31)
- Superchunk (July 26 – August 3, August 6)
- Helium (July 29 – August 3)
- St. Johnny (July 29 – August 3)
- Built to Spill (July 29 – August 6)
- Redman (July 29 – August 6)
- Dirty Three (August 5 – August 19)
- Mike Watt (August 5 – August 19)
- Versus (August 5 – August 19)
- Hum (August 9 – August 16)
- Blonde Redhead (August 9 – August 19)
- The Roots (August 9 – August 19)
- Blowhole (July 4, George, WA)
- The Zeros (July 5, Vancouver)
- Pork Queen (July 5, Vancouver)
- Thomas Jefferson Slave Apartments (July 14, Columbus)
- Sabalon Glitz (July 15, Chicago)
- Tuscadero (July 25, Boston)
- Psychotica (July 28, NYC)
- Patti Smith (July 28, NYC)
- Pavement (August 5, Subbing for Mike Watt in Atlanta)
- Portastatic (August 5, Atlanta)
- Porno For Pyros (August 14, Irvine, CA)
- Gary Young's Hospital (August 17, Sacramento, August 18, Mountain View)
- Overpass (August 18, Mountain View)
- Beck (acoustic, generally)

"Lab Stage":

- Strapping Young Lad (July 5, Vancouver)
- Clod Hopper (Mountain View)
- Pet (July 5, Vancouver)
- Evil Roy Slade (July 5, Vancouver)
- Crankshaft (July 5, Vancouver)
- DDT (July 5, Vancouver)
- Shallow (July 10 – August 17)
- Solid Frog (July 19, Detroit)
- Used (July 19, Detroit)
- Bright Black (July 20, Detroit)
- Breech (July 20, Detroit)
- Voodoo Libido (July 20, Detroit)
- Coltrane WRECK (July 22, Cleveland)
- Queue Up (July 22, Cleveland)
- Killer's Favourite Cartoon (July 23, Toronto)
- Upper Crust (July 25, Boston)
- Tree (July 25, Boston)
- Spring Heel Jack U.S.A. (July 26, Hartford)
- Mung (July 26, Hartford)
- Royale Crown (July 26, Hartford)
- Billy Lamont & Mike Peters (The Alarm) (July 28 NYC)
- Dandelion (July 30, Philadelphia)
- The Trip (July 30, Philadelphia)
- Cracker Snatch (July 30, Philadelphia)
- Swim (August 9, Austin)
- Lucifer Wong (August 9, Austin)
- UFOFU (August 10, Dallas)
- REO Speedealer (August 10, Dallas)
- Prom (August 10, Dallas)
- Porno For Pyros (8/15 Irvine, CA)
- Groovie Ghoulies (August 17, Sacramento)
- Crash And Britany (August 17, Sacramento)
- Extra Fancy (2 dates, maybe Phoenix/LA?)

Sinead O'Connor played her last show of the tour on July 15 in Chicago. At the time, it was rumored Elastica or Frank Black would replace O’Connor for the remainder of the tour. Elastica did eventually join the tour on July 23 in Barrie, ON, despite having prior commitments to play two festivals in Europe in August. During their absence for these European festivals, Superchunk and Moby, both from the second stage, filled in on the main stage for Elastica.

Between O'Connor's last show and Elastica joining the tour, there was no replacement for O’Connor. For the few shows without Sinead, both Sonic Youth and Hole were given longer set times by about 10 minutes and the shows ended roughly 30 minutes earlier.

=== 1996 ===
==== Dates ====
Date	City	Country	Venue
June 27, 1996	Kansas City	United States	Longview Lake
June 28, 1996	Des Moines	United States	Iowa State Fairgrounds
June 30, 1996	Pecatonica	United States	Winnebago County Fairgrounds
July 2, 1996	Noblesville	United States	Deer Creek Music Center
July 3, 1996	Thornville	United States	Buckeye Lake Music Center
July 5, 1996	Barrie	Canada	Molson Park
July 7, 1996	Quebec City	Canada	Quebec Hippodrome
July 9, 1996	Pownal	United States	Green Mountain Race Track
July 10, 1996	New York City	United States	Downing Stadium
July 11, 1996	New York City	United States	Downing Stadium
July 13, 1996	Syracuse	United States	New York State Fairgrounds
July 16, 1996	Ranson	United States	Charles Town Raceway
July 18, 1996	West Palm Beach	United States	Coral Sky Amphitheatre
July 20, 1996	Rockingham	United States	Rockingham Dragway
July 21, 1996	Newport	United States	Forks of the River Entertainment Showpark
July 23, 1996	New Orleans	United States	UNO Lakefront Arena
July 25, 1996	Ferris	United States	Old Fort Dallas
July 27, 1996	Chandler	United States	Compton Terrace
July 30, 1996	George	United States	The Gorge Amphitheatre
~~July 31, 1996~~	George	United States	The Gorge Amphitheatre
August 2, 1996	San Jose	United States	Spartan Stadium
August 3, 1996	Irvine	United States	Irvine Meadows Amphitheatre
August 4, 1996	Irvine	United States	Irvine Meadows Amphitheatre

Main Stage: Metallica, Soundgarden, Ramones, Rancid, Shaolin monks, Screaming Trees, Psychotica

Main Stage on Selected Dates: Rage Against the Machine, Cocteau Twins, Waylon Jennings, Cheap Trick (surprise guest act), Violent Femmes, The Tea Party, Wu-Tang Clan, Steve Earle, Devo, 311, in Canada: Wild Strawberries

Side Stage: Beth Hart Band, Girls Against Boys, Ben Folds Five, Ruby, Cornershop, You Am I, Soul Coughing, Sponge, Melvins, Satchel, Jonny Polonsky, Fireside

Indie Stage: Chune, Moonshake, Lutefisk, Capsize 7, The Cows, Long Fin Killie, Thirty Ought Six, Varnaline, Crumb, Flesh Fetish, Pitbull Daycare, The Sneaches

=== 1997 ===
==== Dates ====
Date	City	Country	Venue
June 25, 1997	West Palm Beach	United States	Coral Sky Amphitheatre
June 27, 1997	Atlanta	United States	Coca-Cola Lakewood Amphitheatre
June 28, 1997	Charlotte	United States	Blockbuster Pavilion
June 29, 1997	Raleigh	United States	Walnut Creek Amphitheatre
July 1, 1997	Virginia Beach	United States	GTE Virginia Beach Amphitheater
July 2, 1997	Bristow	United States	Nissan Pavilion
July 4, 1997	Vaughan	Canada	Kingswood Music Theatre
July 5, 1997	Darien Center	United States	Darien Lake Performing Arts Center
July 8, 1997	Mansfield	United States	Great Woods Center for the Performing Arts
July 11, 1997	New York City	United States	Downing Stadium
July 12, 1997	Camden	United States	Blockbuster-Sony Music Entertainment Centre
July 13, 1997	Hartford	United States	Meadows Music Theater
July 15, 1997	Clarkston	United States	Pine Knob Music Theatre
July 16, 1997	Clarkston	United States	Pine Knob Music Theatre
July 18, 1997	Cuyahoga Falls	United States	Blossom Music Center
July 19, 1997	Burgettstown	United States	Coca-Cola Star Lake Amphitheater
July 20, 1997	Columbus	United States	Polaris Amphitheater
July 22, 1997	Cincinnati	United States	Riverbend Music Center
July 23, 1997	Noblesville	United States	Deer Creek Music Center
July 25, 1997	Tinley Park	United States	New World Music Theatre
July 26, 1997	Mears	United States	Val-Du Lakes Amphitheatre
July 27, 1997	East Troy	United States	Alpine Valley Music Theatre
July 29, 1997	Bonner Springs	United States	Sandstone Amphitheater
July 30, 1997	Maryland Heights	United States	Riverport Amphitheatre
July 31, 1997	Nashville	United States	Starwood Amphitheatre
August 2, 1997	Dallas	United States	Coca-Cola Starplex Amphitheatre
August 3, 1997	Corpus Christi	United States	Texas Sky Festival Park
August 6, 1997	Phoenix	United States	Blockbuster Desert Sky Pavilion
August 8, 1997	San Bernardino	United States	Blockbuster Pavilion
August 10, 1997	Greenwood Village	United States	Coors Amphitheatre
August 12, 1997	George	United States	The Gorge Amphitheatre
August 15, 1997	Concord	United States	Concord Pavilion
August 16, 1997	Mountain View	United States	Shoreline Amphitheatre

Main Stage: Orbital, Devo, The Prodigy, The Orb, Tool, Snoop Doggy Dogg, Tricky, Korn (dropped out in July owing to illness), James, Julian Marley and Damian Marley, Failure

Side Stage: Failure (Failure pulled double-duty: headlining the side stage and filling the main stage void when Korn pulled out due to illness), Beck, Eels, Summercamp, Artificial Joy Club, Jeremy Toback, Dr. Octagon (dropped out), Radish, Old 97's, Inch, Porno for Pyros, The Pugs, Lost Boyz, Agnes Gooch, Demolition Doll Rods, Skeleton Key, Molly McGuire, Orbit

"The worst thing was the venues," observed The Prodigy's Liam Howlett. "They were all seated. Obviously people don't sit down to watch The Prodigy, but the security people were making them sit down. You had all the expensive seats at the front and the moshpit at the back. It was all wrong."

Jon Spencer Blues Explosion were originally announced as part of the tour but were dropped from the line-up without explanation

=== 2003 ===
==== Dates ====
Date	City	Venue
July 5, 2003	Indianapolis	Verizon Wireless Music Center
July 8, 2003	Bonner Springs	Verizon Wireless Amphitheatre
July 9, 2003	St. Louis	UMB Bank Pavilion
July 11, 2003	Milwaukee	Marcus Amphitheatre
July 12, 2003	Chicago	Tweeter Center
July 13, 2003	Columbus	Germain Amphitheatre
July 16, 2003	Cincinnati	Riverbend Music Center
July 18, 2003	Detroit	DTE Energy Music Theatre
July 19, 2003	Pittsburgh	Post-Gazette Pavilion
July 20, 2003	Cleveland	Blossom Music Center
July 23, 2003	Holmdel	PNC Bank Arts Center
July 25, 2003	Boston	Tweeter Center
July 27, 2003	Camden	Tweeter Center at the Waterfront
July 30, 2003	New York	Tommy Hilfiger at Jones Beach Theater
August 1, 2003	Bristow	Nissan Pavilion
August 3, 2003	Atlanta	HiFi Buys Amphitheatre
August 5, 2003	West Palm Beach	Sound Advice Amphitheatre
August 8, 2003	Dallas	Smirnoff Music Center
August 9, 2003	San Antonio	Verizon Wireless Amphitheatre
August 10, 2003	Houston	Cynthia Woods Mitchell Pavilion
August 12, 2003	Albuquerque	Journal Pavilion
August 13, 2003	Denver	Fiddler's Green Amphitheatre
August 15, 2003	Phoenix	Cricket Pavilion
August 16, 2003	Irvine	Verizon Wireless Amphitheatre
August 17, 2003	San Diego	Coors Amphitheatre
August 19, 2003	Mountain View	Shoreline Amphitheatre
August 21, 2003	Salt Lake City	USANA Amphitheatre
August 23, 2003	Seattle	White River Amphitheatre
August 24, 2003	St. Helens	Columbia Meadows

Main Stage: Jane's Addiction, Audioslave, Incubus, Queens of the Stone Age (7/5-8/13), A Perfect Circle (8/12-8/24), Jurassic 5, The Donnas, Rooney (7/5-7/19, 8/12-8/24), The Distillers (The Distillers moved up to the mainstage on the dates that Rooney could not play; both bands were replacements for the band Cold)

Side Stage: Steve-O, Burning Brides (7/20-8/10), Cave In (7/5-7/27), The Distillers (7/5-8/10), Kings of Leon (8/12-8/24), Thirty Seconds to Mars (8/8-8/24), The Music (7/30-8/19), Mondo Generator (7/20-8/10, filled the gap left by The Distillers), The Mooney Suzuki (8/8-8/24), Fingertight (7/5-7/19), MC Supernatural, Boysetsfire (7/20-8/5), Billy Talent (7/20-8/5), Campfire Girls (7/5-7/19), Shihad (As Pacifier), Sleepy Eddie, ColdSnap, Hot Action Cop, Hierosonic, Swizzle Tree, Mr. North, Golden Buddhas, Banyan, Three5Human

=== 2004 (Cancelled) ===
A North American tour was planned with a two-day festival taking place in each city, scheduled to begin on July 14, 2004, and continue through to August 25, 2004.

The following acts were scheduled, but the tour was cancelled due to low ticket sales (most of these bands scheduled shows on the same dates as what would have been the Lollapalooza touring schedule following the tour's cancellation—this caused problems for many fans, who now had to choose which band to see):

- Pixies
- Morrissey
- PJ Harvey
- Sonic Youth
- The Killers
- Wilco
- The Flaming Lips
- The Von Bondies
- The String Cheese Incident
- Modest Mouse
- Le Tigre
- Gomez
- Black Rebel Motorcycle Club
- Danger Mouse
- The Polyphonic Spree
- Broken Social Scene
- Ross Golan
- The Datsuns
- Bumblebeez 81
- The Secret Machines
- Brayndead
- Freakshow
- Sound Tribe Sector 9
- Elbow
- Wheat
- The Coup
- Wolf Eyes
- The Dresden Dolls

=== 2005 ===
Location: Grant Park, Chicago

Dates: July 23, 2005 – July 24, 2005

(Artists listed from earliest to latest set times.)

SBC West Stage

Saturday: M83, Liz Phair, Cake, Primus, Weezer
Sunday: The Ponys, Dinosaur Jr., Drive-By Truckers, Widespread Panic

SBC East Stage

Saturday: The (International) Noise Conspiracy, ...And You Will Know Us by the Trail of Dead, Dashboard Confessional, Billy Idol, Pixies
Sunday: OK Go, Kasabian, Satellite Party, Arcade Fire, The Killers

Budweiser Select Stage

Saturday: The Warlocks, Kaiser Chiefs, The Bravery, The Black Keys, Digable Planets
Sunday: Saul Williams, Louis XIV, Ben Kweller, Spoon, Death Cab for Cutie

Parkways Stage

Saturday: The Redwalls, Ambulance LTD, The Brian Jonestown Massacre, Blonde Redhead, The Walkmen
Sunday: The Changes, Blue Merle, Tegan and Sara, G. Love & Special Sauce, The Dandy Warhols

Planet Stage

Saturday: Hard-Fi, The Dead 60s, VHS or Beta, DJ Muggs, Mash Up Circus, B-Boy Breakdown Royale, DJ Z-Trip, Mark Farina
Sunday: Cathedrals, DeSoL, Los Amigos Invisibles, Soulive, Sound Tribe Sector 9, Derrick Carter

Kidzapalooza

Saturday: Peter DiStefano and Perry Farrell, The Candy Band, Daddy a Go Go, Gwendolyn & the Good Time Gang
Sunday: Ella Jenkins, Daddy a Go Go, Saul Williams and Ladybug of Digable Planets (performing an impromptu set), Gwendolyn & the Good Time Gang, The Candy Band

=== 2006 ===
Location: Grant Park, Chicago

Dates: August 4, 2006 – August 6, 2006

(Artists listed from earliest to latest set times.)

AT&T Stage

Friday: The Subways, Panic! at the Disco, Umphrey's McGee, The Raconteurs, Ween
Saturday: Living Things, Coheed and Cambria, Gnarls Barkley, Common, Kanye West
Sunday: Sparta, Ben Kweller, Matisyahu, Queens of the Stone Age, Red Hot Chili Peppers

Bud Light Stage

Friday: Blue October, Eels, Ryan Adams, My Morning Jacket, Death Cab for Cutie
Saturday: Nada Surf, Built to Spill, Sonic Youth, The Flaming Lips, Manu Chao
Sunday: The Redwalls, Nickel Creek, The Shins, Wilco

adidas-Champ Stage

Friday: Deadboy & the Elephantmen, Aqualung, Stars, Iron & Wine, Sleater-Kinney (Third to last show before "indefinite hiatus")
Saturday: Matt Costa, Feist, Calexico, The Dresden Dolls, Thievery Corporation
Sunday: Mucca Pazza, The Frames, Andrew Bird, Poi Dog Pondering, Blues Traveler

Q101 Stage

Friday: Sound Team, Editors, Cursive, The Secret Machines, Violent Femmes
Saturday: Tonedeff (Last Band Standing Grand Prize Winner), Be Your Own Pet, The Go! Team, Wolfmother, Smoking Popes, The New Pornographers
Sunday: Office, The Hold Steady, Thirty Seconds to Mars, She Wants Revenge, Broken Social Scene

PlayStation Stage

Friday: Midlake, Anathallo, Ohmega Watts, Jeremy Enigk, Lady Sovereign
Saturday: Sa-Ra, Sybris, Peeping Tom, Lyrics Born, Blackalicious
Sunday: Trevor Hall, Burden Brothers, Hot Chip, Pepper, The Reverend Horton Heat

AMD Stage

Friday: Mates of State, The Cankles (Last Band Standing Finalists), Ghostland Observatory, Husky Rescue, The M's, Mutemath
Saturday: Rainer Maria, Cold War Kids, Oh No Oh My, Particle, Disco Biscuits
Sunday: What Made Milwaukee Famous, Manishevitz, Benevento/Russo Duo, The New Amsterdams, of Montreal

BMI Stage

Friday: Bon Mots, Cameron McGill and What Army, Makeshifte, Kelley Stoltz, Jon McLaughlin
Saturday: Musical Outfits, St. James Inc., Lanz, Elvis Perkins, Kill Hannah
Sunday: Katie Todd Band, Catfish Haven, Manchester Orchestra, Moses Mayfield, Assassins, Deadsy

Mind Field Stage

Friday: PlayStation Competition 1: SingStar, Battle Royale 1, The Second City (Comedy). Guadalajara Joe, Battle Royale 2, Mission IMPROVable (Comedy), PlayStation Competition 2: Guitar Hero, Battle Royale 3, Mindfield Mini Movies, Schadenfreude (Comedy), Battle Royale 4, Mindfield Electronic Ambush-VHS or Beta DJ
Saturday: PlayStation Competition 1: SingStar, Battle Royale 1, The Second City (Comedy), Guadalajara Joe, Battle Royale 2, Mission IMPROVable (Comedy), PlayStation Competition 2: Guitar Hero, Battle Royale 3, Mindfield Mini Movies, Schadenfreude (Comedy), Battle Royale 4, Mindfield Electronic Ambush-DJ Rashida
Sunday: PlayStation Competition 1: SingStar, Battle Royale 1, The Second City (Comedy), Battle Royale 2, Mission IMPROVable, PlayStation Competition 2: Guitar Hero, Battle Royale 3, Super Sunday Superhero Pageant, Mindfield Electronic Ambush-Mix Master Mike, Mixin' Marc

Kidz Stage

Friday: ScribbleMonster, Kelly McQuinn and KidTribe, The Candy Band, Alvin Ailey Dancing Workshop, Remo Drum Circle, Peter DiStefano, The Blisters
Saturday: ScribbleMonster, Kelly Mcquinn and KidTribe, The Candy Band, Alvin Ailey Dancing Workshop, Ella Jenkins featuring Asheba, Remo Drum Circle featuring Asheba, Justin Roberts, Peter DiStefano's Guitar Workshop, Chutzpah, breakdancing with the Brickheadz, Remo Drum Circle
Sunday: Paul Green's School of Rock All-Stars, Kelly McQuinn and KidTribe, Perry Farrell and Peter DiStefano, Patti Smith (surprise appearance), The Candy Band, Q Brothers and Chutzpah, Asheba, Remo Drum Circle

Oregon rock band The Standard were set to play, but decided to pull out due to recording duties.

=== 2007 ===
Location: Grant Park, Chicago

Dates: August 3, 2007 – August 5, 2007

(Artists listed from earliest to latest set times.)

AT&T Stage

Friday: Ghostland Observatory, Jack's Mannequin, moe., Satellite Party, Daft Punk
Saturday: Tokyo Police Club, Silverchair, Clap Your Hands Say Yeah, Yeah Yeah Yeahs, Muse
Sunday: Dax Riggs, Lupe Fiasco, Kings of Leon, My Morning Jacket, Pearl Jam

Bud Light Stage

Friday: Soulive, The Polyphonic Spree, M.I.A., The Black Keys, Ben Harper & the Innocent Criminals
Saturday: I'm from Barcelona, Stephen Marley, The Roots, Snow Patrol, Interpol
Sunday: The Cribs, Amy Winehouse, Iggy & the Stooges, Modest Mouse

adidas Stage

Friday: Elvis Perkins in Dearland, Son Volt, Sparklehorse, G. Love & Special Sauce, Femi Kuti & the Positive Force
Saturday: Matt and Kim, Pete Yorn, Sound Tribe Sector 9, Regina Spektor, Patti Smith
Sunday: Juliette and the Licks, Rodrigo y Gabriela, Paolo Nutini, Yo La Tengo, Café Tacuba

MySpace Stage

Friday: The Fratellis, Ted Leo and the Pharmacists, Slightly Stoopid, Blonde Redhead, LCD Soundsystem
Saturday: Shock Stars (Last Band Standing Winner), Sherwood, Tapes 'n Tapes, Motion City Soundtrack, The Hold Steady, Spoon
Sunday: White Rabbits, Heartless Bastards, Blue October, !!!, TV on the Radio

PlayStation Stage

Friday: Carey Ott, Colour Revolt, Charlie Musselwhite, Electric Six, The Rapture
Saturday: High Class Elite, Ryan Shaw, Sam Roberts Band, Rhymefest, Roky Erickson & the Explosives
Sunday: The Postmarks, dios (malos), Los Campesinos!, Apostle of Hustle, The Wailers

Citi Stage

Friday: Helicopters (Last Band Standing Runner-Up), Illinois, Chin Up Chin Up, Viva Voce, Against Me!, Silversun Pickups
Saturday: Arckid, The Satin Peaches, Aqueduct, Cold War Kids, Cansei De Ser Sexy (CSS) (cancelled due to last-minute travel difficulties and replaced by Matt and Kim)
Sunday: The 1900s, David Vandervelde, The Black Angels, Annuals, Peter Bjorn and John

BMI Stage

Friday: The Switches, Tom Schraeder, Bang Bang Bang, Powerspace, Inward Eye, Wax on Radio
Saturday: Dear and the Headlights, Ludo, Kevin Michael, Lady Gaga & Lady Starlight, Cage the Elephant, Back Door Slam
Sunday: The Graduate, Mr. North, Smoosh, The Diffs, John Paul White, Bound Stems

MOTO Stage

Friday: PlayStation Competition: "Buzz" Trivia, The Second City (Comedy), Battle Royale rd. 1, PlayStation Competition: SingStar, Mission IMPROVable (Comedy), Battle Royale rd. 2, Matt Roan, Mickey Avalon
Saturday: PlayStation Competition: "Buzz" Trivia, The Second City (Comedy), Battle Royale rd. 1, PlayStation Competition: SingStar, Mission IMPROVable (Comedy), Battle Royale rd. 2, Josh Hopkins, DJ Klever and DJ Craze
Sunday: PlayStation Competition: "Buzz" Trivia, The Second City (Comedy), Battle Royale rd. 1, PlayStation Competition: SingStar, Mission IMPROVable (Comedy), Battle Royale rd. 2, Flosstradamus, Kid Sister

KIDZ Stage

Friday: Rock for Kids Youth Jam Band, The Hipwaders, The Sippy Cups, Peter Himmelman, Paul Green's School of Rock All-Stars
Saturday: The Candy Band, The Blisters, The Sippy Cups, The Hipwaders, Patti Smith, Jim James
Sunday: Peter Himmelman, Q Brothers, Wee Hairy Beasties, Peter DiStefano & Perry Farrell, Paul Green's School of Rock All-Stars with Perry Farrell, Ben Harper

Sean Lennon appeared on the initial lineup for Lollapalooza but was eventually removed.

=== 2008 ===
Location: Grant Park, Chicago

Dates: August 1, 2008 – August 3, 2008

(Artists listed from earliest to latest set times.)

AT&T Stage

Friday: Holy Fuck (initially Noah and the Whale), Yeasayer, Gogol Bordello, Bloc Party, Radiohead
Saturday: The Ting Tings, The Gutter Twins, Brand New, Lupe Fiasco, Rage Against the Machine
Sunday: Kid Sister, Brazilian Girls, G. Love & Special Sauce, Gnarls Barkley, Kanye West

Bud Light Stage

Friday: Black Lips, The Go! Team, The Black Keys, The Raconteurs
Saturday: Does It Offend You, Yeah?, Dierks Bentley, Explosions in the Sky, Broken Social Scene, Wilco
Sunday: White Lies, The John Butler Trio, Iron & Wine, Love and Rockets, Nine Inch Nails

MySpace Stage

Friday: Bang Camaro, Rogue Wave, The Kills, Mates of State, Stephen Malkmus and the Jicks
Saturday: The Melismatics (Last Band Standing Winner), Margot & the Nuclear So and So's, Dr. Dog, MGMT, Jamie Lidell, Toadies
Sunday: The Octopus Project, The Whigs, Chromeo, Blues Traveler, Mark Ronson

PlayStation 3 Stage

Friday: K'naan, Butch Walker, Duffy, Cat Power
Saturday: De Novo Dahl, Mason Jennings, DeVotchKa, Okkervil River, Sharon Jones & The Dap-Kings
Sunday: Office, The Weakerthans (cancelled), Amadou & Mariam, Flogging Molly, The National

Citi Stage

Friday: (Last Band Standing), Sofia Talvik, Manchester Orchestra, The Enemy, Louis XIV, Free Sol, Grizzly Bear, Cansei de Ser Sexy
Saturday: Witchcraft, Ferras, Foals, Booka Shade, Spank Rock, Battles
Sunday: The Blakes, What Made Milwaukee Famous, Nicole Atkins & The Sea, Black Kids, Saul Williams, Girl Talk

Perry's Stage

Friday: Willy Joy, Zebo, Holy Fuck (DJ Set), James Curd, Million $ Mano, VHS or Beta (DJ Set)
Saturday: Dani Deahl, Devlin & Darko, Dash Mihok, Perry Farrell & Special Guest (Slash), Does It Offend You, Yeah? (DJ Set), DJ AM, DJ MomJeans
Sunday: The Glamour, Smalltown DJs, E-Six & Roan, DJ Mel, Franki Chan, Flosstradamus

BMI Stage

Friday: We Go to 11, Magic Wands, The Parlor Mob, Electric Touch, Black Joe Lewis & the Honeybears, Your Vegas, Cadence Weapon, The Cool Kids
Saturday: Krista, The Postelles, Innerpartysystem, Steel Train, Serena Ryder, DJ Bald Eagle, Uffie
Sunday: Ha Ha Tonka, Wild Sweet Orange, Tally Hall, Newton Faulkner, Eli "The Paperboy" Reed & The True Loves

Kidz Stage

Friday: Suzy Brack and the New Jack Lords, Paul Green's School of Rock All-Stars, The Dream Jam Band, The Terrible Twos, Jeff Tweedy (of Wilco), Rogue Wave, Tiny Masters of Today
Saturday: The Dream Jam Band, Tiny Masters of Today, The Jimmies, The Terrible Twos, Special Guest, Homemade Jamz Blues Band
Sunday: Q Brothers, The John Butler Trio, Homemade Jamz Blues Band, The Jimmies, G. Love & Special Sauce, Peter DiStefano & Tor Hyams, Perry Farrell & Special Guest (Slash), Paul Green's School of Rock All-Stars

Santigold appeared on the initial lineup for Lollapalooza but was eventually removed.

=== 2009 ===
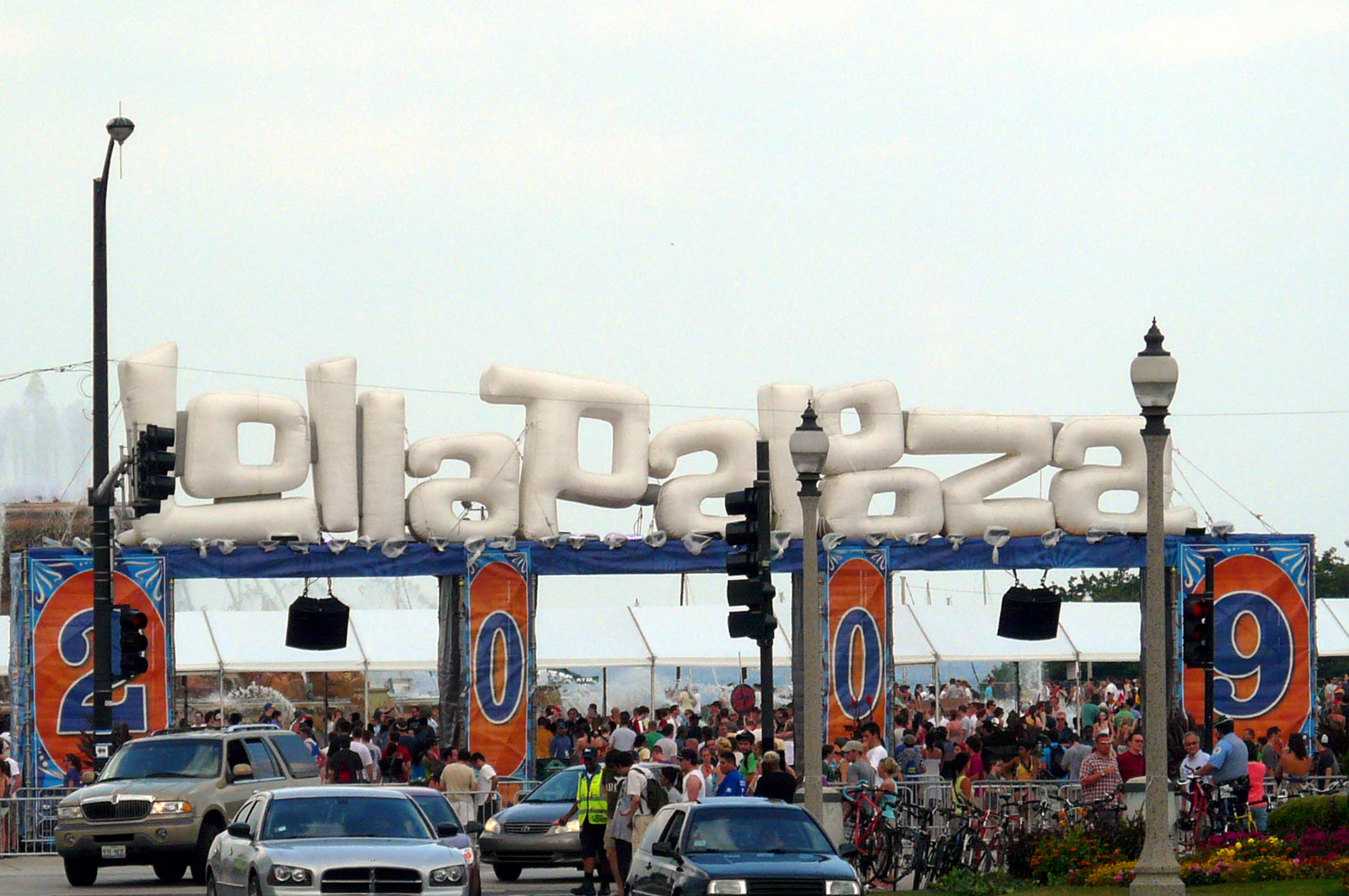
2009 Lollapalooza entrance in Grant Park

Location: Grant Park, Chicago

Dates: August 7, 2009 – August 9, 2009

(Artists listed from earliest to latest set times)

Chicago 2016 Stage
Friday: Hey Champ, The Gaslight Anthem, Sound Tribe Sector 9, Thievery Corporation, Depeche Mode
Saturday: Living Things, Atmosphere, Coheed and Cambria, Rise Against, Tool
Sunday: Ra Ra Riot, The Airborne Toxic Event, Vampire Weekend, Snoop Dogg, The Killers

Budweiser Stage

Friday: Manchester Orchestra, White Lies, Ben Folds, The Decemberists, Kings of Leon
Saturday: Delta Spirit, Los Campesinos!, Arctic Monkeys, TV on the Radio, Yeah Yeah Yeahs (replaced Beastie Boys)
Sunday: Friendly Fires, Kaiser Chiefs, Neko Case, Lou Reed, Jane's Addiction

Vitaminwater Stage

Friday: The Henry Clay People, Black Joe Lewis & the Honeybears, Heartless Bastards, Crystal Castles, of Montreal
Saturday: The Low Anthem, Miike Snow, Gomez, Glasvegas, Animal Collective
Sunday: Alberta Cross, Bat for Lashes, Dan Deacon, Cold War Kids, Silversun Pickups

PlayStation Stage

Friday: Hockey, Zap Mama, Bon Iver, Fleet Foxes, Andrew Bird
Saturday: Ezra Furman and the Harpoons, Federico Aubele, Robert Earl Keen, Santigold, Ben Harper and Relentless7
Sunday: Sam Roberts Band, Portugal. The Man, The Raveonettes, Dan Auerbach, Band of Horses

Citi Stage

Friday: Other Lives, The Knux, Amazing Baby, The Virgins, Asher Roth, Peter Bjorn and John
Saturday: thenewno2, Constantines, Ida Maria, Chairlift, No Age, Lykke Li
Sunday: Carney, Davy Knowles and Back Door Slam, Cage the Elephant, Gang Gang Dance, Passion Pit, Deerhunter

Perry's Stage

Friday: DJ Pasha (Last Band Standing Winner), Nick Catchdubs, DJ Mel, Dark Wave Disco, Hollywood Holt, Rye Rye (cancelled), La Roux (cancelled), The Bloody Beetroots (DJ Set), A-Trak, Simian Mobile Disco (DJ Set), Crookers, Kid Cudi
Saturday: Punky Fresh (Last Band Standing Winner), Moneypenny, Kaskade, Animal Collective (DJ Set), Prophit, Perry Farrell and Special Guest, Hercules and Love Affair (DJ Set), LA Riots, Diplo, Bassnectar
Sunday: Yello Fever, Car Stereo (Wars), He Say, She Say, The Hood Internet, The Glitch Mob, Boys Noize, MSTRKRFT, Deadmau5

BMI Stage

Friday: April Smith, Gringo Star, The Builders and the Butchers, Kevin Devine, Eric Church
Saturday: Band of Skulls, Dirty Sweet, Langhorne Slim, Joe Pug, Blind Pilot
Sunday: Mike's Pawn Shop, Esser, The Greencards, Priscilla Renea (replaced Neon Hitch), Ke$ha

Kidz Stage

Friday: Yuto Miyazawa, Paul Green's School of Rock All-Stars, Frances England, Secret Agent 23 Skidoo, Zach Gill (from ALO), Special Guest, Lunch Money
Saturday: Frances England, Zach Gill (from ALO), Quinn Sullivan, Secret Agent 23 Skidoo, Care Bears on Fire, Special Guest, Ralph's World
Sunday: Care Bears on Fire, Q Brothers, Ralph's World, Peter DiStefano & Tor Hyams, Perry Farrell, Paul Green's School of Rock All-Stars with Perry Farrell

=== 2010 ===
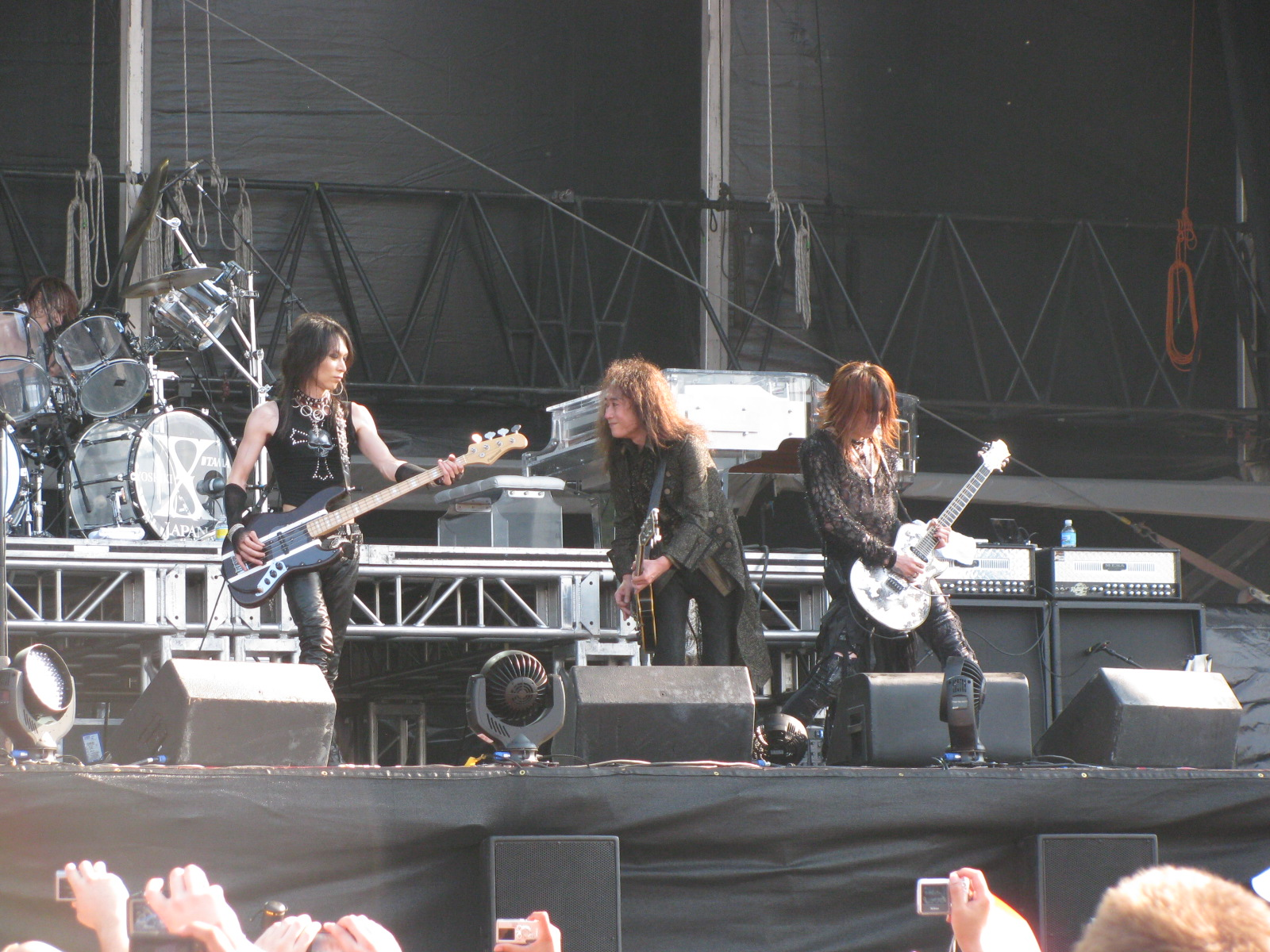
X Japan at Lollapalooza in 2010

Location: Grant Park, Chicago

Dates: August 6, 2010 – August 8, 2010

(Artists listed from earliest to latest set times)

Parkways Foundation
Friday: Balkan Beat Box, Raphael Saadiq, Devo, Hot Chip, Lady Gaga
Saturday: Rebelution, Blues Traveler, Gogol Bordello, Social Distortion, Green Day
Sunday: Nneka, The Cribs, X Japan, Wolfmother, Soundgarden

Budweiser Stage
Friday: Wavves, Mavis Staples, The New Pornographers, The Black Keys, The Strokes
Saturday: The Soft Pack, Stars, Grizzly Bear, Spoon, Phoenix
Sunday: The Antlers, Blitzen Trapper, Yeasayer, MGMT, Arcade Fire

PlayStation Stage
Friday: B.o.B, Los Amigos Invisibles, Drive-By Truckers, Dirty Projectors, Jimmy Cliff
Saturday: The Kissaway Trail, Wild Beasts, The xx, Metric, Cut Copy
Sunday: Miniature Tigers, The Dodos, Mumford & Sons, Mutemath, The National

adidas Stage
Friday: Javelin, The Walkmen, The Big Pink, Matt & Kim, Chromeo
Saturday: Mimicking Birds, Rogue Wave, Against Me!, AFI, Slightly Stoopid
Sunday: Health, Switchfoot, Minus the Bear, Erykah Badu, Cypress Hill

Sony bloggie
Friday: Foxy Shazam, The Constellations, American Bang, Cymbals Eat Guitars, Fuck Buttons, Jamie Lidell
Saturday: The Morning Benders, Harlem, Warpaint, Dawes, Deer Tick, Edward Sharpe and the Magnetic Zeros
Sunday: Frank Turner, Company of Thieves, The Ike Reilly Assassination, Hockey, Frightened Rabbit, The Temper Trap

Perry's Stage
Friday: LDJS Remix, BBU, Ancient Astronauts, Ana Sia, Peanut Butter Wolf, Kidz in the Hall, J. Cole, Caspa, Erol Alkan, Tiga, 2ManyDJs
Saturday: Lance Herbstrong, Only Children, Vonnegutt, FreeSol, Beats Antique, Wolfgang Gartner, Steve Porter, Joachim Garraud, PerryEtty vs. Chris Cox, DJ Snake, Kaskade, Rusko, DJ Mel, Empire of the Sun
Sunday: Dani Deahl, Team Bayside High, Felix Cartal, Didi Gutman of Brazilian Girls, Nervo, Chiddy Bang, Mexican Institute of Sound, Dirty South, Flosstradamus, Felix da Housecat, Digitalism (DJ Set) The Unknown Facez Hardstyle dj set

BMI Stage
Friday: These United States, The Ettes, Jukebox the Ghost, My Dear Disco, Semi Precious Weapons, Neon Trees
Saturday: MyNameIsJohnMichael, Skybox, Dragonette, Dan Black, Royal Bangs
Sunday: Son of a Bad Man, Neon Hitch, The Band of Heathens, Freelance Whales, Violent Soho

Kidzapalooza Stage
Friday: The Happiness Club, School of Rock, The Candy Band, Tim and the Space Cadets, Rocknoceros, Ed Kowalczyk, Recess Monkey
Saturday: Tim and the Space Cadets, The Candy Band, Rocknoceros, The Verve Pipe, The Happiness Club, Dan Zanes and the Chicago Youth Symphony Orchestra, JP. Chrissie & the Fairground Boys
Sunday: School of Rock, Q Brothers, Recess Monkey, Dan Zanes and the Chicago Youth Symphony Orchestra, Peter DiStefano & Tor, Thenewno2, Perry Farrell, The Verve Pipe

=== 2011 ===
==== Lollapalooza Chile ====
Lollapalooza Chile 2011

Location: Parque O'Higgins in Santiago, Chile

Dates: April 2, 2011 – April 3, 2011

(Artists listed from earliest to latest set times)

Coca-Cola Zero Stage
Saturday: Francisca Valenzuela, Steel Pulse, James, The National, The Killers
Sunday: Mala Rodriguez, 311, The Flaming Lips, Thirty Seconds to Mars, Kanye West

Claro Stage
Saturday: Los Bunkers, Cypress Hill, Ben Harper, Deftones
Sunday: Quique Neira, Todos Tus Muertos, Chico Trujillo, Sublime with Rome, Jane's Addiction

Kidzapalooza Stage
Saturday: Magic Twins, Power Peralta, Los Pulentos, Achu
Sunday: Cuchara, Joe Vasconcellos & Fractal, Los Plumabits, Power Peralta, Los Pulentos

Tech Stage
Saturday: Devil Presley, Astro, dënver, Anita Tijoux, Bomba Estéreo, Edward Sharpe & the Magnetic Zeros, Datarock, CSS
Sunday: Mundano, Como Asesinar a Felipes, The Ganjas, Fother Muckers, Devendra Banhart, Cat Power, The Drums, Cold War Kids

LG Stage (Movistar Arena)
Saturday: Ital, New Kids on the Noise, DJ Raff, Latin Bitman, Zeta Bosio, Perryetty vs. Chris Cox, Joachim Garraud, Empire of the Sun, Fatboy Slim

Sunday: Matanza, Javiera Mena, Toy Selectah, Ghostland Observatory, Fischerspooner, Boys Noize, Armin Van Buuren

==== Lollapalooza ====
Lollapalooza 2011

Location: Grant Park, Chicago

Dates: August 5, 2011 – August 7, 2011

Music Unlimited

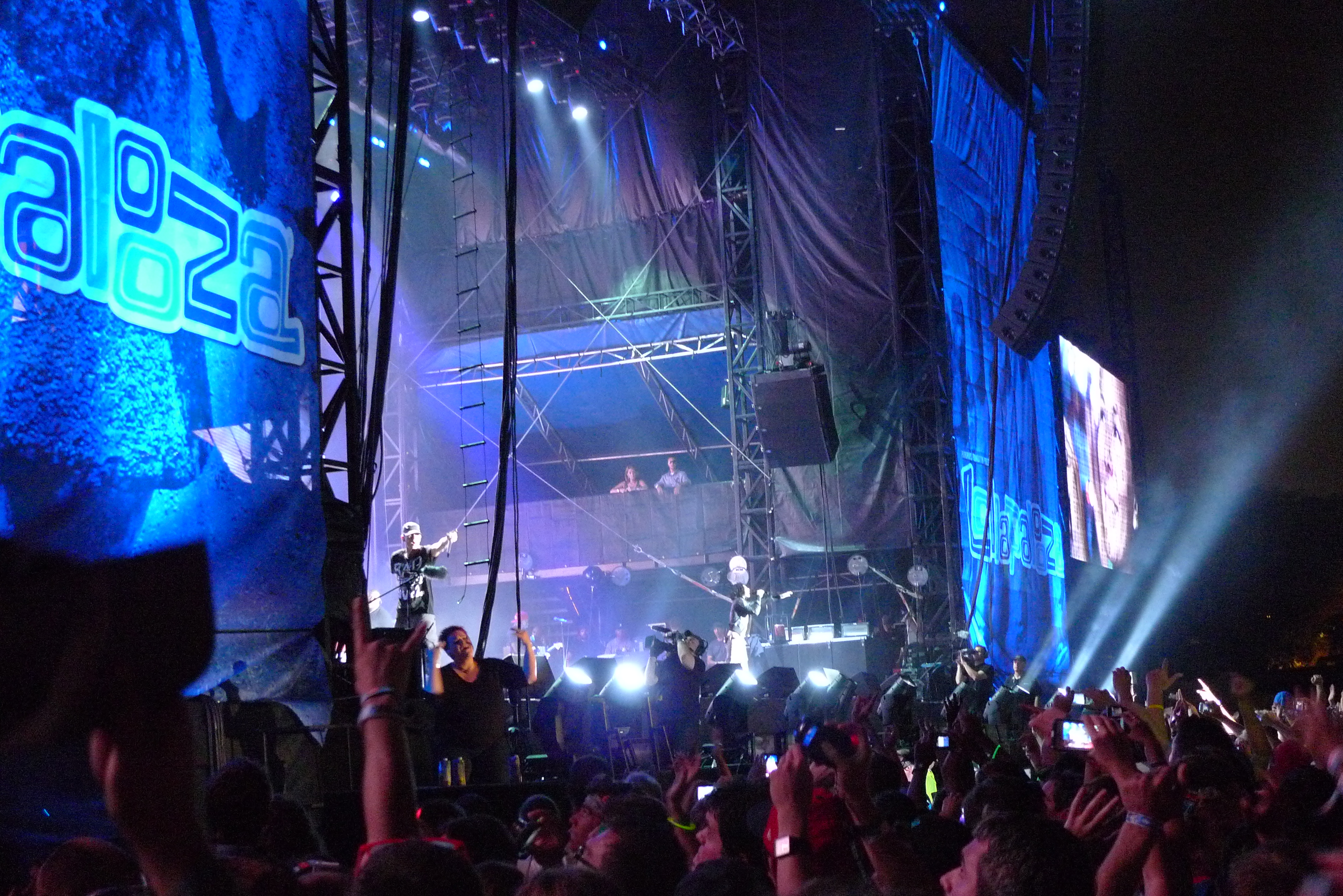
Eminem performing at Lollapalooza in 2011

Friday: The Vaccines, Delta Spirit, White Lies, A Perfect Circle, Muse
Saturday: Walk the Moon, Fitz and the Tantrums, Big Audio Dynamite, Cee Lo Green, Eminem
Sunday: Titus Andronicus, Ryan Bingham & the Dead Horses, The Cars, Arctic Monkeys, Foo Fighters

Bud Light
Friday: Young the Giant, Grace Potter & The Nocturnals, The Kills, Bright Eyes, Coldplay
Saturday: Disappears, Friendly Fires, Death from Above 1979, Ween, My Morning Jacket
Sunday: The Joy Formidable, Noah & The Whale, Flogging Molly, Damian Marley & Nas, deadmau5

Sony
Friday: Wye Oak, The Naked and Famous, Foster the People, Two Door Cinema Club, Crystal Castles
Saturday: Grouplove, Phantogram, Mayer Hawthorne & The County, Local Natives, Atmosphere
Sunday: Lord Huron, Imelda May, The Pains of Being Pure at Heart, Portugal. The Man, Explosions in the Sky

BMI
Friday: Ruby Jane, Ceci Bastida, Electric Touch, Kerli, Kids These Days, Black Cards, Christina Perri
Saturday: Ximena Sarinana, Typhoon, Skylar Grey, The Chain Gang of 1974, Patrick Stump, The Pretty Reckless
Sunday: The Kingston Springs, Deluka, Lia Ices, Young Man, Boy & Bear, Sam Adams

Google+
Friday: Ryan Leslie, Tennis, Reptar, Le Butcherettes, Cults, Tinie Tempah, OK Go, Ratatat
Saturday: Julia Easterlin, An Horse, Maps & Atlases, Dom, The Drums, Ellie Goulding, Lykke Li, Beirut
Sunday: Iration, Fences, Little Hurricane, Dale Earnhardt Jr. Jr., Lissie, Best Coast, Manchester Orchestra, Cold War Kids

PlayStation
Friday: TAB the Band, Los Bunkers, Smith Westerns, The Mountain Goats, Dani Deahl
Saturday: J Roddy Walston and the Business, Chico Trujillo, Black Lips, Deftones, Beats Antique
Sunday: Gold Motel, Rival Schools, City and Colour, Cage the Elephant, DJ Mel

Perry's

Girl Talk, Pretty Lights, Kid Cudi, The Bloody Beetroots Death Crew 77, Afrojack, Modeselektor, Skrillex, PerryEtty vs. Chris Cox, Chuckie, The Glitch Mob, Busy P, Joachim Garraud, Super Mash Bros, The Cool Kids, 12th Planet, Daedelus, Feed Me, Jackmaster, Collie Buddz, Savoy, Kyle Lukas & Captain Midnight, Ana Tijoux, Midnight Conspiracy, L1ght, DJ Lady D.

=== 2012 ===
==== Lollapalooza Chile ====
Lollapalooza Chile 2012

Location: Parque O'Higgins in Santiago, Chile

Dates: March 31, 2012 – April 1, 2012

Claro-LG Stage
Saturday: Pedro Piedra, Gentleman, Thievery Corporation, Cage The Elephant, Björk
Sunday: Bbs Paranoicos, Foster The People, Lea Michele, Band of Horses, Joan Jett & the Blackhearts, Foo Fighters

Coca-Cola Stage
Saturday: Gustavo Cordera, Gogol Bordello, Los Jaivas, Arctic Monkeys
Sunday: Camila Moreno, Friendly Fires, TV on the Radio, MGMT

Alternative Stage
Saturday: Adanowsky, Plebe Rude, HopPo!, Los Tetas, Electrodomesticos, Crosses
Sunday: Álex Anwandter, Juana Fe, System Solar, Morodo, Illya Kuryaki and the Valderramas, Peaches

Perry's Stage
Saturday: El Sueño de la Casa Propia, Adrianigual, Ritmo Machine, Surtek Collective, Pretty Lights, Bassnectar, Calvin Harris
Sunday: Mawashi, Soul & Senses, PerryEtty vs Chris Cox, The Crystal Method, Tinie Tempah, Skrillex, Above & Beyond

Huntcha Stage
Saturday: Dion, Beat Calavera, Pulenta, La Mala Senda, Föllakzoid, Silvestre
Sunday: Newen Afrobeat, Yael Meyer, Gush, We are the Grand, Fernando Milagros, Jiminelson

Kidzapalooza Stage
Saturday: Mosquitas Muertas, Inti Illimani Histórico, MC Billeta, 31 Minutos

Sunday: Anitchie, Mazapán, Chevy Metal (as a secret show), 31 Minutos

==== Lollapalooza Brazil ====
Lollapalooza Brazil 2012

Location: The Jockey Club in Sao Paulo, Brazil

Dates: April 7, 2012 – April 8, 2012

Cidade Jardim Stage
Saturday: Ritmo Machine, Marcelo Nova, O Rappa, TV on the Radio, Foo Fighters.
Sunday: Plebe Rude, Thievery Corporation, Manchester Orchestra, Foster the People, Lea Michele, Arctic Monkeys

Butantã Stage
Saturday: Wander Wildner, Cage The Elephant, Band of Horses, Joan Jett and The Blackhearts
Sunday: Cascadura, Gogol Bordello, Friendly Fires, MGMT, Jane's Addiction

Alternativo Stage
Saturday: Balls, Daniel Belleza e os Corações em Fúria, Tipo Uísque, Pavilhão 9
Sunday: Blubell, Suvaca, Black Drawing Chalks, Garage Fuzz, Velhas Virgens

Perry's Stage
Saturday: Marcio Techjun, Veiga & Salazar, Rhythm Monks, PerryEtty vs Chris Cox, Peaches, Bassnectar, The Crystal Method, Calvin Harris
Sunday: Daniel Brandão, Kings of Swingers, Killer on the Dancefloor, Pretty Lights, Tinie Tempah, Skrillex, Racionais MC's

Kidzapalooza Stage
Saturday: Zé & Cia – Trenzinho de Gente, Sam Batera e Absolut, Bichos do Mundo

Sunday: Abigail Conta Mais de Mil, Solange Sá – Piolhos, Meg Monteiro e Banda Symbol, Crianças Crionças – Cid Campos

==== Lollapalooza ====
Lollapalooza 2012

Location: Grant Park, Chicago

Dates: August 3, 2012 – August 5, 2012

Bud Light Stage
Friday: O Rappa, The Black Angels, Metric, Passion Pit, Black Sabbath
Saturday: Los Jaivas, Delta Spirit, Alabama Shakes (cancelled due to weather), Franz Ferdinand, Avicii
Sunday: Oberhofer, White Rabbits, J. Cole, Florence + The Machine, Justice

Red Bull Soundstage
Friday: The Growlers, Dr. Dog, The Afghan Whigs, The Shins, The Black Keys
Saturday: Doomtree, Aloe Blacc, The Temper Trap (cancelled due to weather), The Weeknd, Red Hot Chili Peppers
Sunday: Bombay Bicycle Club, Trampled by Turtles, Sigur Ros, At the Drive-In, Jack White

Sony Stage
Friday: Wax, Yellow Ostrich, Tame Impala, The Head and the Heart, M83
Saturday: JC Brooks & the Uptown Sound, Bear In Heaven, Neon Indian (cut short due to weather), Tune-Yards, Bloc Party
Sunday: Bowerbirds, Poliça, The Walkmen, Toro Y Moi, Miike Snow

PlayStation Stage
Friday: First Aid Kit, Michael Kiwanuka, Sharon Van Etten, Die Antwoord, DJ Zebo
Saturday: Milo Greene, JEFF the Brotherhood, JJ Grey & MOFRO, The Tallest Man On Earth, Orchard Lounge
Sunday: Mona, The Devil Makes Three, Gary Clark Jr., Amadou & Mariam, DJ Mel

Google Play Stage
Friday: Animal Kingdom, Anamanaguchi, The War on Drugs, Blind Pilot, SBTRKT, Band of Skulls, Dawes, Wale
Saturday: Kopecky Family Band, FIDLAR, Givers, Chairlift, Fun., Washed Out, Twin Shadow, Frank Ocean
Sunday: Point to Infinity, Hey Rosetta!, Macklemore & Ryan Lewis, Dum Dum Girls, The Gaslight Anthem, Of Monsters and Men, The Big Pink, Childish Gambino

BMI Stage
Friday: Ambassadors, Haley Reinhart, Kevin Devine, Dry the River, Helena, thenewno2, Dev
Saturday: Laura Warshauer, Chancellor Warhol, Moon Taxi, Empires, The Dunwells, LP, Walk Off the Earth
Sunday: Red Oblivion, Outasight, Overdōz, Imaginary Cities, The Sheepdogs, Yuna, The Jezabels

Perry's Stage
Friday: Young Bloods, The White Panda, Totally Enormous Extinct Dinosaurs, Zedd, Madeon, Porter Robinson, NERO, Bassnectar
Saturday: Chief Keef, Salva, Star Slinger, Paper Diamond, B.o.B (cancelled due to weather), Skream & Benga, Calvin Harris, Santigold

Sunday: Kid Color, DJ Nihal, Nadastrom, Little Dragon, Doctor P, Big Gigantic, Zeds Dead, Kaskade

=== 2013 ===
==== Lollapalooza Chile ====
Lollapalooza Chile 2013

Location: Parque O'Higgins in Santiago, Chile.

Dates: April 6, 2013 – April 7, 2013

Saturday: Pearl Jam, Queens of the Stone Age, Kaskade, The Hives, Kaiser Chiefs, Two Door Cinema Club, Passion Pit, Los Tres, Crystal Castles, Major Lazer, Puscifer, The Temper Trap, Of Monsters and Men, Alabama Shakes, Chancho en Piedra, Zeds Dead, Gepe, Banda Conmoción, Dread Mar I, Carla Morrison, DJ Marky, Zonora Point, Mecanico, Pascuala y Fauna, Intimate Stranger, Tréboles, Keko Yoma, Cachureos, Sinergia, Los Plumabits.

Sunday: The Black Keys, deadmau5, A Perfect Circle, Franz Ferdinand, Steve Aoki, Hot Chip, Keane, Nas, Tomahawk, Manuel García, Foals, Feed Me, Porter Robinson, Gary Clark Jr., Marcelo D2, Bad Brains, Toro y Moi, Perrosky, Amadou & Miriam, De Saloon, Russian Red, Protistas, Poncho, Resina Lala, Kali Mutsa, Red Oblivion, Agents, Daniel Klauser, Transubhiriano, Mago Oli.

==== Lollapalooza Brazil ====
Lollapalooza Brazil 2013

Location: The Jockey Club in Sao Paulo, Brazil

Dates: March 29, 2013 – March 31, 2013

Pearl Jam, The Killers, The Black Keys, deadmau5, Queens Of The Stone Age, Planet Hemp, A Perfect Circle, Franz Ferdinand, Kaskade, Steve Aoki, The Hives, The Flaming Lips, Knife Party, Cake, Kaiser Chiefs, Two Door Cinema Club, Hot Chip, Passion Pit, Criollo, Tomahawk, Nas, Foals, Crystal Castles, Major Lazer, Puscifer, Gui Boratto, Porter Robinson, The Temper Trap, Madeon, Alabama Shakes, Of Monsters and Men, Zeds Dead, Rusko, Toro y Moi, Gary Clark, Jr., Technostalgia feat. DJ Marky & Bid, Feed Me, Lirinha + Eddie, Agridoce, Vanguart, Vivendo Do Ócio, Mix Hell, Holger, Dirtyloud, Wehbba, Ludov, AgraforrÉia XilarmÔnica, Tokyo Savannah, Copacabana Club, Wannabe Jalva, Baia, RepÚblica, Stop Play Moon, Database, Lennox, Boss In Drama, Classic, William Naraine, Perrosky, Bruno Barudi

==== Lollapalooza ====
Lollapalooza 2013

Location: Grant Park, Chicago

Dates: August 2, 2013 – August 4, 2013

Bud Light Stage
Friday: Io Echo, Ghost B.C., Band of Horses, Queens of the Stone Age, Nine Inch Nails
Saturday: Planet Hemp, Charles Bradley, Ellie Goulding, Kendrick Lamar, The Postal Service
Sunday: Palma Violets, Alex Clare, Two Door Cinema Club, Vampire Weekend, Phoenix

Red Bull Sound Select Stage
Friday: Emeli Sandé, Smith Westerns, Crystal Castles, New Order, The Killers
Saturday: Shovels & Rope, Ben Howard, Local Natives, The National, Mumford & Sons
Sunday: Astro, Wild Nothing, Tegan and Sara, Grizzly Bear, The Cure

Lake Shore Stage
Friday: Robert DeLong, Icona Pop, Father John Misty, Imagine Dragons, Hot Chip
Saturday: Wheeler Brothers, Little Green Cars, Court Yard Hounds, Eric Church, The Lumineers
Sunday: Guards, Wild Belle, Lianne La Havas, Alt-J, Beach House

Petrillo Band Shell
Friday: The Neighbourhood, Deap Vally, Jessie Ware, Thievery Corporation, Lance Herbstrong
Saturday: The Bright Light Social Hour, Reignwolf, Matt & Kim, Foals, Supreme Cuts
Sunday: Yawn, Jake Bugg, Baroness, The Vaccines, RVSB

Grove Stage
Friday: Drowners, San Cisco, Twenty One Pilots, Atlas Genius, Theophilus London, Disclosure, Frightened Rabbit, Lana Del Rey
Saturday: Family of the Year, Pujol, St. Lucia, HAIM, Unknown Mortal Orchestra, Heartless Bastards, Death Grips (cancelled), Azealia Banks (cancelled), Bad Things
Sunday: Red Bull Sound Select Winner, The Orwells, Skaters, MS MR, Wavves, DIIV, 2 Chainz, Cat Power

BMI Stage
Friday: American Authors, D-Pryde, Brick + Mortar, Houndmouth, Pacific Air, Hey Marseilles, Chance the Rapper
Saturday: Frontier Ruckus, Beast Patrol, Wild Cub, Lukas Nelson & P.O.T.R., The Dunwells, Brooke Waggoner, Blondfire
Sunday: O'Brother, Makeshift Prodigy, Wake Owl, The Mowgli's, Machines Are People Too, Bear Mountain, Half Moon Run

Perry's Stage
Friday: Brite Lite Brite, Keys N Krates, Timeflies, Monsta, Dillon Francis, Modestep, Flux Pavilion, Steve Aoki
Saturday: Cherub, Cole Plante, 360, GRiZ, Baauer, Adventure Club, Dada Life, Steve Angello

Sunday: Stratus, Alvin Risk, Angel Haze, Kill the Noise, Art Department, Dog Blood, Major Lazer, Knife Party

=== 2014 ===
==== Lollapalooza Chile ====
Lollapalooza Chile 2014

Location: Parque O'Higgins in Santiago, Chile.

Dates: March 29, 2014 – March 30, 2014

Featured performers included Red Hot Chili Peppers, Arcade Fire, Soundgarden, Nine Inch Nails, Pixies, Phoenix, New Order, Vampire Weekend, Imagine Dragons, Axwell, Ellie Goulding, Julian Casablancas, Zedd, Kid Cudi, Johnny Marr, Lorde, The Bloody Beetroots, Francisca Valenzuela, Cafe Tacvba, The Wailers, Portugal. The Man, Cage The Elephant, Joachim Garraud, Nino Cohete, Upa!, Somos Manhattan, Wolfgang Gartner, Capital Cities, Jake Bugg, AFI, Flux Pavilion, Krewella, Ana Tijoux, We Are The Grand, Dr. Vena, Movimiento Original, Alejandro Vivanco, Baauer and others.

==== Lollapalooza Argentina ====
Lollapalooza Argentina 2014

Location: Hipódromo San Isidro in Buenos Aires, Argentina.

Dates: April 1 and 2, 2014

Featured performers included Arcade Fire, Red Hot Chili Peppers, Nine Inch Nails, Soundgarden, Phoenix, Imagine Dragons, Pixies, Vampire Weekend, Julian Casablancas + The Voidz, New Order, Axwell, Ellie Goulding, Zedd, Kid Cudi, Illya Kuryaki and the Valderramas, Capital Cities, Lorde, Johnny Marr, Portugal. The Man, Cage the Elephant, Jake Bugg, The Bloody Beetroots, Jovanotti, AFI, Savages, Wolfgang Gartner, Juana Molina, Onda Vaga, Flux Pavilion, Flume, Él Mató a un Policía Motorizado and others.

==== Lollapalooza Brazil ====
Lollapalooza Brazil 2014

Location: Autódromo de Interlagos in São Paulo, Brazil.

Dates: April 5 and 6, 2014

Skol Stage

Saturday: Vespas Mandarinas, Capital Cities, Julian Casablancas, Phoenix, Muse

Sunday: Francisca Valenzuela, Raimundos, Ellie Goulding, Pixies, Arcade Fire

Onix Stage

Saturday: Silva, Cage the Elephant, Imagine Dragons, Nine Inch Nails

Sunday: Illya Kuryaki and the Valderramas, Johnny Marr, Vampire Weekend, Soundgarden

Interlagos Stage

Saturday: Red Oblivion, Lucas Santana, Café Tacvba, Portugal the Man, Lorde, Nação Zumbi, Disclosure

Sunday: Apanhador Só, Brothers of Brazil, Selvagens Á Procura da Lei, Savages, AFI, Jake Bugg, New Order

Perry Stage

Saturday: Elekfantz, Digitaria, Perry/Etty vs. Joachim Geraud, Flume, Flux Pavilion, Wolfgang Gartner, Kid Cudi

Sunday: FTampa, Gabe, Cone Crew Diretoria, Baauer, Krewella, The Bloody Beetroots, Axwell

==== Lollapalooza ====
Lollapalooza 2014

Location: Grant Park, Chicago

Dates: August 1, 2014 – August 3, 2014

Bud Light Stage
Friday: Temples, J Roddy Walston and the Business, Interpol, Lorde, Arctic Monkeys
Saturday: Vance Joy, Kate Nash, Grouplove, Spoon, Calvin Harris
Sunday: Bomba Estéreo, Trombone Shorty and Orleans Avenue, Chromeo, Childish Gambino, Skrillex

Samsung Galaxy Stage

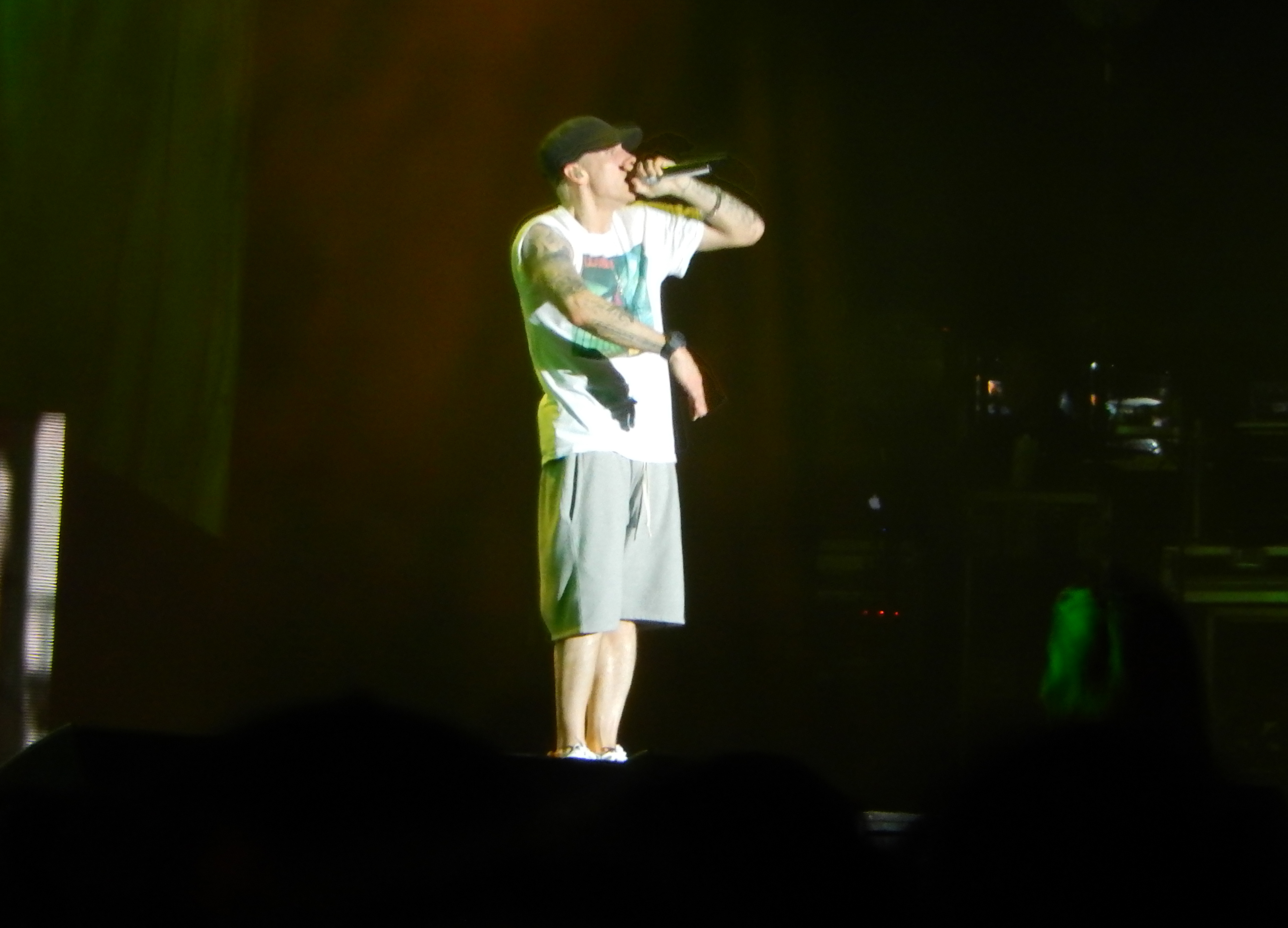
Eminem performing at Lollapalooza in 2014

Friday: Francisca Valenzuela, Bombay Bicycle Club, Portugal. The Man, Broken Bells, Eminem
Saturday: Jungle, Phosphorescent, Fitz and the Tantrums, Foster the People, Outkast
Sunday: Jhené Aiko, White Denim, Cage the Elephant, The Avett Brothers, Kings of Leon

Palladia Stage
Friday: San Fermin, Lucius, Hozier (replaced Dmitri Vegas and Like Mike), AFI, Sander Kleinienberg
Saturday: Papa, Parquet Courts, John Butler Trio, Nas, Joachim Garraud
Sunday: Kongos, Delta Rae, Run the Jewels, Rebelution, Kausea

Lake Shore Stage
Friday: The So So Glos, Kodaline, Warpaint, Chvrches, Lykke Li
Saturday: The Districts, Wildcat! Wildcat!, The Temper Trap, Manchester Orchestra, The Head and the Heart
Sunday: Bear Hands, Bleachers, London Grammar, Glen Hansard, Young the Giant

The Grove Stage
Friday: Roadkill Ghost Choir, Into It. Over It., Courtney Barnett, Jagwar Ma, Blood Orange, Rudimental, The Kooks, Phantogram
Saturday: Jon Batiste and Stay Human, Benjamin Booker, Ratking, Meg Myers, Rich Homie Quan, Smallpools, Typhoon, Jenny Lewis, Cut Copy
Sunday: Shy Girls, Gemini Club, NONONO, RAC, The 1975, The Airborne Toxic Event, Flume, Darkside

BMI Stage
Friday: Highly Suspect, of Verona, DUGAS, Bebe Rexha, Cash Cash, Royal Blood
Saturday: Rocky Business, Charlie Hirsch, Desert Noises, Wallpaper., The Last Internationale, Johnnyswim, Joywave, Vic Mensa
Sunday: Plastic Visions, Space Capone, Fly Golden Eagle, Crass Mammoth, Cardiknox, Betty Who, Bronze Radio Return

Perry's Stage
Friday: Wrestlers, Jacob Plant, Brillz, Perry/Etty vs. Joachim Garraud, Iggy Azalea, Above and Beyond, The Glitch Mob, Zedd
Saturday: Anne Lunoe, Herobust, Z-Trip, Duke Dumont,. Gramatik, Martin Garrix, Chase and Status, Krewella

Sunday: Oyinda, Lindsay Lowend, Crizzly, GTA, Gesaffelstein, Flosstradamus, Sebastian Ingrosso, Chance the Rapper

=== 2015 ===
==== Lollapalooza Argentina ====
Lollapalooza Argentina 2015

Location: Hipodromo de Sán Isidro, Buenos Aires

Dates: March 21, 2015 – March 22, 2015

Main Stage 1
Saturday: Fernandez Fierro, Ed Motta, Interpol, Foster the People, Lea Michele, Jack White
Sunday: Boom Pam, Rudimental, Alt-J, Kasabian, Pharrell Williams

Main Stage 2
Saturday: Miss Bolivia, Leiva, St. Vincent, The Kooks, Robert Plant, Calvin Harris
Sunday: Quique Meira, Fitz and the Tantrums, Pedro Aznar, Bastille, The Smashing Pumpkins, Skrillex

Alternative
Saturday: Despertar Antoles, Francisca Y Los Exploradores, Three Days Grace, Molotov, Chet Faker, Cypress Hill
Sunday: Sambara, Dancing Mood, Kongos, The Last Internationale, Damian Marley

Perry's Stage
Saturday: Hipnótica, Tommy Druetta, Maxi Truso, Kill the Noise, Carnage, The Chainsmokers, Robin Schulz, Nicky Romero

Sunday: Jvlian, Zero Kill, Chancha Via Circuito, Poncho, Big Gigantic, Ritmo Machine, Dillon Francis DJ Snake, Major Lazer

==== Lollapalooza Brazil ====
Lollapalooza Brazil 2015

Location: Autódromo de Interlagos in São Paulo, Brazil.

Dates: March 28, 2015 – March 29, 2015

Skol Stage
Saturday: Baleia, Banda do Mar, Alt-J, Robert Plant, Jack White
Sunday: Scalene, Molotov, Interpol, Foster the People, Lea Michele, Pharrell Williams

Onix Stage
Saturday: Bula, Fitz and the Tantrums, Kasabian, Skrillex
Sunday: Far From Alaska, Rudimental, The Kooks, Calvin Harris

Axe Stage
Saturday: Zimbra, Boogarins, Nem Liminha Ouviu, St. Vincent, Marcelo D2, Kongos, Bastille
Sunday: Dr. Pheabes, Mombojó, O Terno, Three Days Grace, Pitty, Young the Giant, The Smashing Pumpkins

Perry Stage
Saturday: Anna, Vintage Culture, E-Cologyk vs Jakko, DJ Snake, Dillon Francis, Ritmo Machine, Major Lazer

Sunday: Chemical Surf, Fatnotronic, Victor Ruiz Av Any Mello, Big Gigantic, Carnage, The Chainsmokers, Childish Gambino, Steve Aoki

==== Lollapalooza Chile ====
Lollapalooza Chile 2015

Location: Parque O'Higgins in Santiago, Chile.

Dates: March 14, 2015 – March 15, 2015

VTR Stage
Saturday: Fernando Milagros, Donavon Frankenreiter, The Kooks, The Smashing Pumpkins, Jack White
Sunday: Quique Neira, Astro, The Specials, Bastille, Robert Plant, Kings of Leon

Coca-Cola Stage
Saturday: López, Congreso, Molotov, Foster the People, Lea Michele, Skrillex
Sunday: Pedro Piedra, Lumumba, Alt-J, Kasabian, Calvin Harris

VTR D-Box Stage
Saturday: DJ Caso, MKRNI, Matanza, Kill the Noise, Carnage, Dillon Francis, Ritmo Machine, Nicky Romero
Sunday: AFRIK, ATOM, Rudimental, RVSB, DJ Snake, Cypress Hill, Major Lazer

Acer Windows 8 Stage
Saturday: Abya Yala, Maxi Trusso, Zaturno, Camila Moreno, Chancho en Piedra + Los Tetas, St. Vincent (musician), Ana Tijoux
Sunday: Coffeehouse, Portavoz, Mass Mental, Chet Faker, The Last Internationale, Chet Faker, Damian Marley, SBTRKT, Interpol

Lotus Stage
Saturday: Marineros, OH Margot!, Manu Da Banda, Hielo Negro, Esteman, Chinoy, Javiera y Los Imposibles

Sunday: Farmacos, Dead Christine, Lilits, Maria Magdalena, Miss Garrison, Yajaira, Tinariwen

==== Lollapalooza ====
Lollapalooza 2015

Location: Grant Park, Chicago

Dates: July 31, 2015 – August 2, 2015

Bud Light Stage
Friday: Coasts (band), St. Paul And The Broken Bones, Hot Chip, alt-J, The Weeknd
Saturday: Holychild, Sturgill Simpson, The Tallest Man on Earth, Kid Cudi, Sam Smith
Sunday: Night Terrors of 1927, Moon Taxi, Odesza, A$AP Rocky, Bassnectar

Samsung Galaxy Stage
Friday: SZA, Glass Animals, Cold War Kids, Alabama Shakes, Paul McCartney
Saturday: Catfish and the Bottlemen, Django Django, Death From Above 1979, Tame Impala, Metallica
Sunday: Circa Waves, George Ezra, Twenty One Pilots, Of Monsters and Men, Florence and the Machine

Palladia Stage
Friday: Mighty Oaks, James Bay, Father John Misty, The War on Drugs, Big Once and Trentino
Saturday: Beat Connection, GIVERS, Toro Y Moi, Tyler, The Creator, Light Em Up
Sunday: Sheppard, Shakey Graves, Angus & Julia Stone, Gogol Bordello, NGHTMRE

Sprint Stage
Friday: Spookyland, MisterWives, Tove Lo, MS MR, Gary Clark Jr.
Saturday: Jessica Hernandez & the Deltas, Ryn Weaver, Charli XCX, WALK THE MOON, Brand New
Sunday: The Wombats, Twin Peaks, Marina and The Diamonds, Lord Huron, TV On The Radio

Pepsi Stage
Friday: Gabriel Garzón-Montano, Kyle Thornton & the Company, Jamestown Revival, BADBADNOTGOOD, BROODS, Philip Selway, First Aid Kit, Sylvan Esso, Flying Lotus
Saturday: Mick Jenkins, Raury, Zella Day, Wet, Hermitude, Delta Spirit, Chet Faker, Banks, G-Eazy
Sunday: In The Whale, Lion Babe, DMA's, Skylar Spence, Strand of Oaks, Wild Belle, Albert Hammond Jr., FKA twigs, Kygo

BMI Stage
Friday: Daye Jack, The New Pacific, Black Pistol Fire, LANY, Bear's Den, BØRNS, Young Thug
Saturday: Janelle Kroll, Hippo Campus, COIN, Pell, White Sea, Elle King, Mt. Eden
Sunday: Atarah Valentine, Zebra Katz, SirenXX, VÉRITÉ, The Lonely Biscuits, Bully, Halsey

Perry's Stage
Friday: Slaptop, Peking Duk, DESTRUCTO, What So Not, DJ Mustard, DJ Snake, Dillon Francis, Kaskade
Saturday: Jack Novak, SNBRN, Travi$ Scott, CAKED UP, RL Grime, Boys Noize, Carnage, Alesso

Sunday: jackLNDN, Black Tiger Sex Machine, Alison Wonderland, Mako, Galantis, LOGIC, The Chainsmokers, Nicky Romero, NERO

==== Lollapalooza Berlin ====
Lollapalooza Berlin 2015

Location: Tempelhof Airport in Berlin, Germany.

Dates: September 12, 2015 – September 13, 2015

Main Stage 1

Saturday: Joywave, James Bay, Parov Stelar Band, Bastille, Macklemore & Ryan Lewis

Sunday: Wolf Alice, Stereophonics, Belle & Sebastian, Sam Smith, Muse

Main Stage 2

Saturday: Razz, Everything Everything, Mighty Oaks, FFS (Franz Ferdinand & Sparks), Deichkind

Sunday: Coasts, Brand New, My Morning Jacket, Beatsteaks, Seeed

Alternative Stage

Saturday: Parquet Courts, Glass Animals, MS MR, Hot Chip, Chvrches, The Libertines

Sunday: Dawes, Pond, Clean Bandit, Run the Jewels, Crystal Fighters, Little Dragon, Tame Impala

Perry's Stage

Saturday: David K., Hayden James, The 2 Bears, Perry/Etty vs. Joachim Garraud, Digitalism, Dog Blood (Skrillex & Boys Noize), Fatboy Slim

Sunday: Hugel, Felix Jaehn, Klangkarussell, Kygo, Robin Schulz, Dada Life, Martin Garrix

=== 2016 ===
==== Lollapalooza Brazil ====
Lollapalooza Brazil 2016

Location: Autódromo de Interlagos, São Paulo

Dates: March 12 and 13, 2016

Skol Stage

Saturday: The Baggios, Matanza, Bad Religion, Tame Impala, Eminem, MGMT

Sunday: Dingo Bells, Marrero, Twenty One Pilots, Noel Gallagher's High Flying Birds, Florence and the Machine

Onix Stage

Saturday: Dônica, Eagles of Death Metal, Of Monsters And Men, Mumford and Sons

Sunday: Malgore, Walk the Moon, Alabama Shakes, Jack Ü

Axe Stage

Saturday: Ego Kill Talent, Supercombo, Vintage Trouble, The Joy Formidable, Cold War Kids, Halsey, Die Antwoord, Marina and the Diamonds

Sunday: Versalle, Seeed, Albert Hammond Jr., Odesza, Jungle, Planet Hemp

Trident at Perry's

Saturday: Zerb, Groove Delight, Matthew Koma, A-Trak, RL Grime, Flosstradamus, Alok, Kaskade

Sunday: Funky Fat, Karol Conka, Jack Novak, Gramatik, Duke Dumont, Zeds Dead, Emicida, Zedd

==== Lollapalooza Argentina ====
Lollapalooza Argentina 2016

Location: Hipódromo de San Isídro, Buenos Aires

Dates: March 18 and 19, 2016

Main Stage 1

Friday: Sig Ragga, Eagles of Death Metal, Jungle, Of Monsters and Men, Eminem

Saturday: Eruca Sativa, Carajo, Alabama Shakes, Noel Gallagher's High Flying Birds, Florence and the Machine

Main Stage 2

Friday: Stone Giant, Meteoros, Walk the Moon, Twenty One Pilots, Tame Impala, Jack Ü

Saturday: Juan Ingaramo, Vintage Trouble, Ghost, Brandon Flowers, MGMT, Mumford and Sons, Kaskade

Alternative Stage

Friday: Eric Mandarina, El Kuelgue, Seeed, The Joy Formidable, Halsey, IKV

Saturday: Los Espiritus, Boom Boom Kid, Odesza, Bad Religion, Marina and the Diamonds, Babasonicos

Perry Stage

Friday: Frane Y La Fanktor, Solimano Live, Zuker, Jack Novak, Gramatik, Flosstradamus, Duke Dumont, Zedd

Saturday: Villa Diamante, Festa Bros, Leo Garcia, Matthew Koma, A-Trak, RL Grime, Die Antwoord

==== Lollapalooza Chile ====
Lollapalooza Chile 2016

Location: Parque O'Higgins, Santiago

Dates: March 18 and 19, 2016

VTR Stage

Saturday: Movimiento Original, The Joy Formidable, Jungle, Tame Impala, Eminem

Sunday: Vintage Trouble, Twenty One Pilots, Alabama Shakes, Noel Gallagher's High Flying Birds, Florence and the Machine

Itaú Stage

Saturday: Ases Falsos, Javiera Mena, Albert Hammond Jr., Of Monsters and Men, Jack Ü

Sunday: Tinariwen, Babasonicos, Bad Religion, Brandon Flowers, Mumford and Sons

Kidzapalooza Stage

Saturday: Despertando Las Neuronas, School of Rock, Magia Real, Cachureos

Sunday: Cantando Aprendo a Hablar, Haumoana, Florcita Motuda, Mike Tompkins

Acer – Windows 10 Stage

Saturday: Jiminelson, Eagles of Death Metal, Candlebox, Walk the Moon, Halsey, Gepe

Sunday: Tiano Bless, Seeed, Odesza, Marina and the Diamonds, Ghost, Die Antwoord

d-BOX VTR Stage

Saturday: DJ Who, Jack Novak, Bitman & Roban, Flosstradamus, Duke Dumont, Todos Tus Muertos, Zedd

Sunday: Tunacola, Matthew Koma, Gramatik, A-Trak, RL Grime, Zeds Dead, Kaskade

Lotus Stage

Saturday: Julius Popper, The Suicide Bitches, Telebit, Magaly Fields, Kuervos del Sur, Föllakzoid

Sunday: Planeta No, Stone Giant, La Guacha, Oddó, Aguaturbia

==== Lollapalooza ====
Lollapalooza 2016

Location: Grant Park, Chicago

Dates: July 28, 2016 – July 31, 2016

Bud Light Stage

Thursday: Lana Del Rey, The 1975, City and Colour, Melanie Martinez, Frances

Friday: Major Lazer, Future, Cherub, Frank Turner & The Sleeping Souls, Lewis Del Mar

Saturday: Disclosure, Two Door Cinema Club, Leon Bridges, The Joy Formidable, LOLAWOLF

Sunday: Ellie Goulding, HAIM, Local Natives, FIDLAR, BANNERS

Petrillo Bandshell Stage

Thursday: Bad Royale, Kurt Vile and the Violators, Danny Brown, Hiatus Kaiyote, Pinegrove

Friday: Boombox Cartel, Mac Miller, Lettuce, Modern Baseball, HAELOS

Saturday: Slumberjack, Chris Stapleton, Nathaniel Rateliff & The Night Sweats, Dua Lipa, Jarryd James

Sunday: Jackal, Bryson Tiller, Third Eye Blind, Classixx, VHS Collection

Pepsi Stage

Thursday: The Last Shadow Puppets, Cashmere Cat, AlunaGeorge, Towkio, Wavves, Bob Moses, Cloves, Jazz Cartier, The Greeting Committee

Friday: Ghost, A$AP FERG, Wolf Alice, Alessia Cara, RÜFÜS DU SOL, Kiiara, Hayden James, Saba, Race Banyon

Saturday: Vic Mensa, ST. LUCIA, Houndmouth, Jack Garratt, Alina Baraz, Tory Lanez, Baio, Tor Miller, Honeysuckle

Sunday: ZHU, Vince Staples, Snake Hips, AURORA, Louis the Child, MUNA, DRAM, Sir The Baptist, Smino

BMI Stage

Thursday: SoMo, firekid, Wild Child, Arkells, Skizzy Mars, Lucy Dacus

Friday: Sunflower Bean, JAHKOY, PVRIS, Muddy Magnolias, Polly A, Horse Thief

Saturday: Secret Weapons, FRANKIE, Nothing, DROWNERS, Potty Mouth, AudioDamn!

Sunday: Flatbush Zombies, Mothers, TOTEM, Unified Highway, DREAMERS, LANco

Perry's Stage

Thursday: Flosstradamus, Excision, Tchami, Don Diablo, Grandtheft, Mr. Carmack, Alle Farben, The Noisy Freaks

Friday: Martin Garrix, GRiZ, Duke Dumont, Bro Safari, Audien, Skepta, Party Favor, Illenium, Curt Reynolds

Saturday: Hardwell, Big Gigantic, Oliver Heldens, Jauz, Marshmello, AC Slater, Generik, SMIIRK

Sunday: Die Antwoord, Adventure Club, Yellow Claw, Seven Lions, Snails, Lindsey Stirling, Mija, BURNS

Lakeshore Stage

Thursday: The Arcs, Daughter, Yeasayer, Bas, Cozz, Omen, Tennyson

Friday: Miike Snow, Frightened Rabbit, MØ, Saint Motel, Con Brio

Saturday: Grimes, MUTEMATH, The Front Bottoms, Chairlift, The Strumbellas

Sunday: Bloc Party, Silversun Pickups, Years & Years, Oh Wonder, Panama Wedding

Samsung Stage

Thursday: J. Cole, G-Eazy, Bastille, Kehlani, Autolux

Friday: Radiohead, M83, Foals, The Struts, Day Wave

Saturday: Red Hot Chili Peppers, Jane's Addiction, Big Grams (Big Boi + Phantograms), X Ambassadors, Nothing But Thieves

Sunday: LCD Soundsystem, Flume, Halsey, Marian Hill, Låpsey

==== Lollapalooza Berlin ====
Lollapalooza Berlin 2016

Location: Treptower Park, Berlin

Dates: September 10 and 11, 2016

Main Stage 1

Saturday: Dubioza Kolektiv, Catfish and the Bottlemen, Tocotronic, Philipp Poisel, Kings of Leon

Sunday: Aurora, Years & Years, James Blake, Radiohead

Main Stage 2

Saturday: Josef Salvat, Lindsey Stirling, Jess Glynne, Max Herre and the Kahedi Orchestra, Paul Kalkbrenner

Sunday: MNEK, Bilderbuch, Milky Chance, Major Lazer

Alternative Stage

Saturday: Graham Candy, Jagwar Ma, Kaiser Chiefs, Odesza, G-Eazy, New Order

Sunday: L.A., Nothing But Thieves, The Temper Trap, Róisín Murphy, Beginner, The 1975

Perry's Stage

Saturday: Junge Junge, Matoma, Alan Walker, DESTRUCTO, Klingande, The Chainsmokers, Chase & Status, Dimitri Vegas & Like Mike

Sunday: Topic, Jonas Blue, Tujamo, Lost Frequencies, Martin Solveig, Alle Farben, Zedd

=== 2017 ===
==== Lollapalooza Brazil ====
Lollapalooza Brazil 2017

Location: Autódromo de Interlagos, São Paulo

Dates: March 25–26, 2017

Continental Stage

Saturday: Doctor Pheabes, Suricato, Cage the Elephant, Rancid, Metallica

Sunday: Céu, Jimmy Eat World, Two Door Cinema Club, The Strokes

Onix Stage

Saturday: The Outs, Glass Animals, The 1975, The xx

Sunday: Bratislava, Catfish and the Bottlemen, Duran Duran, The Weeknd

AXE Stage

Saturday: Jaloo, BaianaSystem, Bob Moses, Tegan and Sara, Criolo, Tove Lo, The Chainsmokers

Sunday: Daniel Groove, Vance Joy, Silversun Pickups, MØ, Melanie Martinez, Flume

Perry's Stage

Saturday: Ricci, Haikaiss, Victor Ruiz, Don Diablo, Tchami, Vintage Culture, Marshmello, G-Eazy

Sunday: Gabriel Boni, Illusionize, Chemical Surf, Borgore, GRiZ, Oliver Heldens, Nervo, Martin Garrix

==== Lollapalooza Argentina ====
Lollapalooza Argentina 2017

Location: Hipódromo de San Isídro, Buenos Aires

Dates: March 31 – April 1, 2017

Main Stage 1

Friday: Deny, Leon Gieco, Cage the Elephant, Rancid, Metallica

Saturday: Bandalos Chinos, Tegan and Sara, Jimmy Eat World, Two Door Cinema Club, The Strokes

Main Stage 2

Friday: La Máquina Camaleón, Silversun Pickups, Glass Animals, The 1975, The xx, The Chainsmokers

Saturday: Usted Señalemelo, Turf, Catfish and the Bottlemen, Duran Duran, The Weeknd, Flume

Alternative Stage

Friday: Joystick, Huevo, Palo Pandolfo, Campo, Nicola Cruz, Vance Joy, Tove Lo, G-Eazy

Saturday: Un Planeta, Bestia Bebé, El Plan de la Mariposa, La Yegros, Criolo, Malevo, Lisandro Aristimuño, MØ, Melanie Martinez

Perry's Stage

Friday: Fianru, DJ Paul, Poncho, Alok, Don Diablo, Tchami, Marshmello

Saturday: Sara Hebe, Mad Professor, Borgore, GRiZ, Nervo, Oliver Heldens, Martin Garrix

==== Lollapalooza Chile ====
Lollapalooza Chile 2017

Location: Parque O'Higgins, Santiago

Dates: April 1–2, 2017

VTR Stage

Saturday: La Pozze Latina, Lucybell, Cage the Elephant, Rancid, Metallica

Sunday: We Are The Grand, Álex Anwandter, Jimmy Eat World, Two Door Cinema Club, The Strokes

Itaú Stage

Saturday: Villa Cariño, Weichafe, Glass Animals, The 1975, The xx

Sunday: Liricistas, Gondwana, Catfish and the Bottlemen, Duran Duran, The Weeknd

Acer Windows 10 Stage

Saturday: Prehistóricos, Newen Afrobeat, Silversun Pickups, Bomba Estéreo, Tove Lo, G-Eazy

Sunday: Chicago Toys, Tegan and Sara, Vance Joy, MØ, Melanie Martinez, Flume

Perry's Stage By VTR

Saturday: Román y Castro, Alok, DJ Who?, Don Diablo, Tchami, Marshmello, Diplo

Sunday: Rod Valdés, Vives & Forero, Borgore, GRiZ, Nervo, Oliver Heldens, Martin Garrix

Lotus Stage

Saturday: Me Llamo Sebastián, 8 Monkys, Paz Court y la Orquesta Florida, Dr. Vena, Crisalida, López

Sunday: Tus Amigos Nuevos, Mariel Mariel, Enrique Icka, Amahiro, Temple Agents, Boraj, Zaturno & Mc Piri, Mad Professor

Aldea Verde Stage

Saturday: Meli Moyu, Amahiro, Javier & Angel Parra, Beatriz Pichi Malen

Sunday: Shaliva Tabdar, Voces del Desierto, Subhira, Natalia Contesse

==== Lollapalooza Paris ====
Lollapalooza Paris 2017

Location: Hippodrome de Longchamp, Paris

Dates: July 22 – 23, 2017

Main Stage 1

Saturday: The Weeknd, The Roots, Skepta, Lemaitre, Jeremy Loops

Sunday: Red Hot Chili Peppers, Pixies, Editors, Rival Sons, Walk Off the Earth, Charli XCX

Main Stage 2

Saturday: Imagine Dragons, The Hives, Milky Chance, Bear's Den, Max Jury

Sunday: Lana Del Rey, Liam Gallagher, Seasick Steve, Don Broco

Alternative Stage

Saturday: London Grammar, LP, Glass Animals, Crystal Fighters, Tiggs Da Author, Anna Kova

Sunday: Alt-J, La Femme, IAM, Tom Odell, Oscar and the Wolf, Tess

Perry's Stage

Saturday: Tchami, Martin Solveig, Yellow Claw, Oliver Heldens, Jauz, Joyryde, Black Tiger Sex Machine, Moksi, Cinnamon

Sunday: DJ Snake, Marshmello, Don Diablo, Alan Walker, Slushii, NGHTMRE, Henri PFR, KIKKR, Dustycloud

==== Lollapalooza ====
Lollapalooza 2017

Location: Grant Park, Chicago

Dates: August 3 – 6, 2017

August 3

- Muse (cancelled due to inclement weather)
- Lorde (cancelled due to inclement weather)
- Cage the Elephant
- Wiz Khalifa
- Porter Robinson
- Liam Gallagher
- Migos
- Spoon
- Lil Uzi Vert
- Jon Bellion
- George Ezra
- Capital Cities
- Kaytranada
- Baauer
- The Drums
- A-Trak
- Tritonal
- Gryffin
- Golf Clap
- CRX
- Temples
- Hippo Campus
- MAX
- Honne
- Cheat Codes
- Kevin Devine
- Paper Diamond
- Middle Kids
- White Reaper
- The Hunna
- Oliver Tree
- Jain
- The O'My's
- Declan McKenna
- Unlike Pluto
- Atlas Genius
- A R I Z O N A
- Gibbz
- Pham
- Michael Blume
- Elohim
- Stanaj
- Kweku Collins
- Suicideboys

August 4

- The Killers
- Blink-182
- DJ Snake
- Run the Jewels
- Foster the People
- Ryan Adams
- Gramatik
- Slushii
- Phantogram
- Tegan and Sara
- Cloud Nothings
- Crystal Castles
- Kaleo
- Little Dragon
- Jidenna
- 3lau
- Whitney
- Mura Masa
- Andrew McMahon in the Wilderness
- Majid Jordan
- Getter
- The Pretty Reckless
- Ookay
- The Districts
- Pup
- Moose Blood
- Skott
- The Lemon Twigs
- Mondo Cozmo
- San Holo
- The Frights
- Saint Jhn
- Bibi Bourelly
- Missio
- Cobi
- Moksi
- Slothrust
- Allan Rayman
- Frenship
- Harriet Brown
- DJ Who
- Jesse Malin
- Bishop Briggs
- Caitlyn Smith

August 5

- Chance the Rapper
- The xx
- Alt-J
- The Head and the Heart
- Kaskade
- Glass Animals
- Vance Joy
- Mac DeMarco
- Russ
- 21 Savage
- MadeinTYO
- Banks
- Sylvan Esso
- Alison Wonderland
- Live
- Royal Blood
- NGHTMRE
- Michael Christmas
- We Are the Grand
- Young Bombs
- Warpaint
- Highly Suspect
- Zara Larsson
- Ron Gallo
- Jai Wolf
- Ephwurd
- Alvvays
- G Jones
- Aminé
- San Fermin
- The Japanese House
- Léon
- The Shelters
- Blossoms
- Jacob Banks
- The London Souls
- 888
- Wingtip
- Colony House
- Brayton Bowman
- Lady Pills

August 6

- Arcade Fire
- Justice
- Big Sean
- The Shins
- Zeds Dead
- Rae Sremmurd
- Tove Lo
- Milky Chance
- Grouplove
- DVBBS
- Borgore
- Lil Yachty
- London Grammar
- Rag'n'Bone Man
- Noname
- Joey Bada$$
- Charli XCX
- Cupcakke
- Car Seat Headrest
- Slander
- Machine Gun Kelly
- 6LACK
- Sampha
- Maggie Rogers
- NF
- JOYRYDE
- Joseph
- Barns Courtney
- VANT
- Grace Mitchell
- Blaenavon
- Lo Moon
- Dirty Audio
- Whethan
- Sofi Tukker
- Xavier Omär
- Boogie
- Wax Motif
- The Walters
- Duckwrth
- Spencer Ludwig
- Flor
- Goody Grace
- Tucker Beathard

==== Lollapalooza Berlin ====
Lollapalooza Berlin 2017

Location: de:Galopprennbahn Hoppegarten, Rennbahn Hoppegarten Berlin

Dates: September 09 and 10, 2017

- Foo Fighters
- Mumford & Sons
- The xx
- Hardwell
- Beatsteaks
- Marteria
- AnnenMayKantereit
- Cro
- Marshmello
- Two Door Cinema Club
- London Grammar
- George Ezra
- Galantis
- Rudimental
- Metronomy
- Michael Kiwanuka
- Oliver Heldens
- Wanda
- Django Django
- Kungs
- WestBam
- Bomba Estéreo
- The Vaccines
- Bear's Den
- The Head and the Heart
- Phantogram
- Anne-Marie
- Aminé
- Mike Perry
- Martin Jensen
- Drunken Masters
- NGHTMRE
- MEUTE

=== 2018 ===
==== Lollapalooza Argentina ====
Lollapalooza Argentina 2018

Location: Hipódromo San Isidro in SI Buenos Aires, Argentina.

Dates: March 16–18, 2018

Main Stage 1

Friday: Jakob, Clubz, El Dante, Anderson .Paak & The Free Nationals, Chance the Rapper, Red Hot Chili Peppers

Saturday: Marilina Bertoldi, The Neighbourhood, Metronomy, Liam Gallagher, The Killers

Sunday: Programa, Aloe, Emmanuel Horvilleur, Milky Chance, The National, Pearl Jam

Main Stage 2

Friday: Indios, Miranda!, Las Pelotas, Royal Blood, Imagine Dragons, Hardwell

Saturday: Barco, Kaleo, Damas Gratis, Khalid, Lana Del Rey

Sunday: Walter Dominguez & The Catbu, Ela Minus, Zoé, Mon Laferte, David Byrne, LCD Soundsystem, Kygo

Alternative Stage

Friday: El Jardín de Ordóñez, Militantes del Climax, Mi Amigo Invencible, Oh Wonder, Spoon, Zara Larsson, Camila Cabello

Saturday: Jesse Baez, Luca Bocci, Tash Sultana, Mac DeMarco, Mac Miller, Wiz Khalifa

Sunday: Isla de Caras, El Zar, Octafonic, Los Espíritus, Volbeat, AURORA, Bajofondo

Perry's Stage

Friday: Valdes, DJ Who, Mitú, Batalla de los Gallos, Satélite 23, Shiba San, What So Not, Alison Wonderland, DVBBS

Saturday: Orlana, Metro Live, Whethan, Louis the Child, NGHTMRE, Deorro, Yellow Claw, DJ Snake

Sunday: Pyura, Leo García + Benito Cerati, Nathy Peluso, Batalla de los Gallos, Thomas Jack, Cheat Codes, Alan Walker, Dillon Francis, Galantis

==== Lollapalooza Chile ====
Lollapalooza Chile 2018

Location: Parque O'Higgins, Santiago

Dates: March 16–18, 2018

VTR Stage

Friday: Pedro Piedra, Ego Kill Talt, Milky Chance, The National, Pearl Jam

Saturday: Alain Johannes, Chancho en Piedra, Mon Laferte, Chance the Rapper, Red Hot Chili Peppers

Sunday: Moral Distraida, Tash Sultana, Metronomy, Liam Gallagher, The Killers

Itaú Stage

Friday: Como Asesinar a Felipes, Zoé, Los Jaivas, David Byrne, LCD Soundsystem

Saturday: Santaferia, Las Pelotas, Anderson .Paak & The Free Nationals, Imagine Dragons

Sunday: Kuervos del Sur, Damas Gratis, Mac DeMarco, Khalid, Lana Del Rey

Perry's Stage

Friday: Hedo, Jordan Ferrer, Shoot the Radio, Thomas Jack, Cheat Codes, Alan Walker, Dillon Francis, Galantis

Saturday: Rubio, DJ Caso, Mitú, Shiba San, What So Not, Alison Wonderland, DVBBS, Hardwell

Sunday: DJ Mel, Whethan, Louis the Child, NGHTMRE, Deorro, Yellow Claw, DJ Snake

Acer Stage

Friday: Spiral Fortex, Lanza Internacional, Bajofondo, Volbeat, Aurora, Kygo

Saturday: Ceaese, Fernando Milagros, Oh Wonder, Royal Blood, Zara Larsson, Camila Cabello

Sunday: Camileazy, Kapitol, Mac Miller, Kaleo, Spoon, The Neighbourhood, Wiz Khalifa

Lotus Stage

Friday: Fuglar, Cordillera, The Ganjas, Maxi Vargas, Sinergia, De Kiruza

Saturday: Tentempies, MKRNI, Amílcar, Movimiento Original, Latin Bitman, Vicente Sanfuentes

Sunday: Solucion Violeta, Ribo, Boom Boom Kid, Tiano Bless, Quique Neira, El Búho, Matanza

Aldea Verde Stage

Friday: Hausi Kuta, Tumu Tapu, Alex June

Saturday: Colores Musicales, DJ Nea, Matanza, El Buho

Sunday: MKRNI, Spiral Vortex, Roman & Castro, ZSanchos

==== Lollapalooza Brazil ====
Lollapalooza Brazil 2018

Location: Autódromo de Interlagos in São Paulo, Brazil

Dates: March 23–25, 2018

Budweiser Stage

Friday: Nem Liminha Ouviu, Selvagens À Procura de Lei, Rincon Sapiência, Spoon, Chance The Rapper, Red Hot Chili Peppers

Saturday: Tagore, Ego Kill Talent, Anderson Paak & The Free Nationals, The National, Pearl Jam

Sunday: Braza, Milky Chance, The Neighbourhood, Liam Gallagher, The Killers

Onix Stage

Friday: Luneta Mágica, Vanguart, Volbeat, Royal Blood, LCD Soundsystem

Saturday: Ventre, Liniker e os Caramellows, Kaleo, David Byrne, Imagine Dragons

Sunday: Francisco, el Hombre, Sofi Tukker, Metronomy, Khalid, Lana Del Rey

Axe Stage

Friday: Plutão Já Foi Planeta, Mallu Magalhães, Oh Wonder, Zara Larsson, Mac DeMarco

Saturday: Jesuton, Tash Sultana, O Terno, Mano Brown, Kygo

Friday: Mahmundi, Tiê, Tropkillaz, AURORA, Wiz Khalifa

Perry's By Doritos

Friday: Sevenn, Kyle Watson, FTampa, Shiba San, What So Not, Alison Wonderland, DVBBS, Galantis, Alok

Saturday: Devochka, Gustavo Mota, Whethan, Louis the Child, Mac Miller, NGHTMRE, Deorro, Yellow Claw, DJ Snake

Sunday: Jørd, Jetlag, Cat Dealers, Thomas Jack, Cheat Codes, Alan Walker, Dillon Francis, Hardwell,

==== Lollapalooza Paris ====
Lollapalooza Paris 2018

Location: Hippodrome de Longchamp in Paris, France.

Dates: July 21–22, 2018

Line-up

Mainstage 1

Saturday: Scarlxrd, Lil Pump, Kaleo, Kasabian, Depeche Mode

Sunday: Jess Glynne, French Montana, Stereophonics, Nekfeu, Gorillaz

Mainstage 2

Saturday: Alma, Zara Larsson, Black Rebel Motorcycle Club, Bastille, Travis Scott

Sunday: Tom Walker, Catfish and the Bottlemen, Dua Lipa, Noel Gallagher's High Flying Birds, The Killers

Alternative Stage

Saturday: The Inspector Cluzo, Fidlar, Nothing But Thieves, Bomba Estéreo, Dadju, Portugal. The Man, The Blaze

Sunday: BB Brunes, Vald, Rag'n'Bone Man, Years & Years, Parov Stelar

Perry's Stage

Saturday: Basstrick, Ekali, Ghastly, Valentino Khan, San Holo, Rezz, Paul Kalkbrenner, Diplo

Sunday: Wax Motif, Droeloe, Taska Black, TroyBoi, Slander, RL Grime, Dillon Francis, Krewella, Excision

==== Lollapalooza ====
Lollapalooza 2018

Location: Grant Park in Chicago

Dates: August 2–5, 2018

August 2

- Arctic Monkeys
- Travis Scott
- Khalid
- Chvrches
- Galantis
- Camila Cabello
- Rezz
- Rebelution
- Tycho
- Franz Ferdinand
- Billie Eilish
- Jaden Smith
- A Boogie wit da Hoodie
- All Time Low
- LANY
- Petit Biscuit
- The Wombats
- Kayzo
- Stars
- Shiba San
- Terror Jr
- G Herbo
- Tyler Childers
- Basement
- Cuco
- London on da Track
- Madison Beer
- Curtis Harding
- Allie X
- 4B
- Space Jesus
- Slaves
- Supa Bwe
- Nick Mulvey
- Valee
- Jesse Baez
- Virgil Abloh
- Gashi
- LZRD
- FLETCHER
- Wes Period
- DJ Taye
- Larkin Poe

August 3

- Bruno Mars
- The National
- Post Malone
- Tyler, the Creator
- Walk the Moon
- Dillon Francis
- James Bay
- Brockhampton
- Børns
- Greta Van Fleet
- Malaa
- The Neighbourhood
- Jungle
- Alina Baraz
- Lizzo
- Bebe Rexha
- Parquet Courts
- Alan Walker
- Rusko
- Dermot Kennedy
- Big Wild
- Lauv
- Valentino Khan
- Lewis Capaldi
- Taylor Bennett
- Gang of Youths
- Two Feet
- Post Animal
- Welshly Arms
- Goldfish
- Alex Lahey
- Matt Maeson
- CKY
- Dream Wife
- Clairo
- Kuuro
- Buddy
- R.LUM.R
- Chase Atlantic
- Oshi
- Noizu
- Nothing, Nowhere.
- Cleopatrick
- Mainland

August 4

- The Weeknd
- Vampire Weekend
- Logic
- St. Vincent
- Zedd
- Dua Lipa
- LL Cool J feat. DJ Z-Trip
- Perry Farrell's Kind Heaven
- Catfish and the Bottlemen
- Tash Sultana
- Illenium
- Luke Combs
- Lil Pump
- Daniel Caesar
- Zomboy
- GoldLink
- Hippie Sabotage
- Daya
- Carly Rae Jepsen
- A R I Z O N A
- Bomba Estéreo
- Ghastly
- Autograf
- Tank and the Bangas
- K?d
- Pale Waves
- Wallows
- Yungblud
- Loudpvck
- Sir Sly
- Charlotte Cardin
- Amy Shark
- Brohug
- Lovelytheband
- Femdot
- Droeloe
- Melvv
- Vera Blue
- BlackGummy
- Davie
- Morgxn
- Bones
- Grace Weber
- Emilia Ali

August 5

- Jack White
- ODESZA
- Lil Uzi Vert
- Portugal. The Man
- Excision
- Gucci Mane
- Lykke Li
- Chromeo
- Playboi Carti
- Rainbow Kitten Surprise
- Manchester Orchestra
- Quinn XCII
- Kali Uchis
- Nav
- What So Not
- Rex Orange County
- Cigarettes After Sex
- Anderson East
- Sabrina Claudio
- The Vaccines
- TroyBoi
- Chris Lake
- Herobust
- Knox Fortune
- Frenship
- Durand Jones & The Indications
- Ekali
- Jessie Reyez
- Superorganism
- The Coronas
- The Regrettes
- Sasha Sloan
- Freya Ridings
- The Him
- John Splithoff
- Dorothy
- Medasin
- Mikky Ekko
- Tim Gunter
- Morgan Saint
- Van William
- The Wrecks
- The Aces

==== Lollapalooza Berlin ====
Lollapalooza Berlin 2018

Location: Olympiapark in Berlin, Germany.

Dates: September 8–9, 2018

Main Stage 1

Saturday: Mokoomba, Lewis Capaldi, Years & Years, Casper, The Weeknd

Sunday: Giant Rooks, RIN, Dua Lipa, Liam Gallagher, Kraftwerk

Main Stage 2

Saturday: Kat Frankie, RAF Camora and Bonez MC, Ben Howard, The National, K.I.Z

Sunday: Dhani Harrison, Rag'n'Bone Man, Freundeskreis, Imagine Dragons

Alternative Stage

Saturday: Low Island, The Night Game, Gurr, Fil Bo Riva, Sofi Tukker, ASAP Ferg, Von Wegen Lisbeth, The Wombats

Sunday: Clairo, Alexis Taylor, Wolf Alice, Friendly Fires, Jorja Smith, Fink, Trettmann

Perry's Stage

Saturday: Oliver Koletzki, Alison Wonderland, Ofenbach, Jonas Blue, DVBBS, Armin Van Buuren, David Guetta

Sunday: Smiie, Danny Avila, San Holo, Nervo, SXTN, Showtek, Scooter, Kygo

Weingarten Stage

Saturday: Claudio Donzelli, Apey, Thorsten Nagelschimdt, Berliner Kneipenchor, Laura Carbone, Kendy Gable, Berliner Kneipenchor, Helgen, L.A. Salami

Sunday: Yoga, Berliner Kneipenchor, Manuel Moglich, Berliner Kneipenchor, The Everettes, Beranger, Hak Baker, David Keenan

=== 2019 ===
==== Lollapalooza Argentina ====
Lollapalooza Argentina 2019

Location: Hipódromo San Isidro in Buenos Aires, Argentina.

Dates: March 29–31, 2019

Main Stage 1

Friday: Telescopios, Conociendo Rusia, Escalandrum, Kamasi Washington, Bring Me the Horizon, Interpol, Twenty One Pilots

Saturday: Alfonsina, Lelé, Los Hermanos, Foals, The 1975, Arctic Monkeys

Sunday: Gativideo, Barbi Recanati, LANY, La Mona Jiménez, Greta Van Fleet, Paulo Londra, Kendrick Lamar

Main Stage 2

Friday: 1915, Wos, Parcels, Portugal. The Man, Jorge Drexler, Post Malone, Steve Aoki

Saturday: Yataians, Ca7riel, Perotá Chingó, Troye Sivan, Fito Páez, Sam Smith, Tiësto

Sunday: Tomi Morano, Bambi, Lali, Snow Patrol, Caetano + Moreno + Zeca & Tom Veloso, Lenny Kravitz, Odesza

Alternative Stage

Friday: La Grande, The Fever 333, Alex Anwandter, Rosalía, Rüfüs Du Sol, Years & Years

Saturday: Candelaria Zamar, Perras on the Beach, Jain, Juana Molina, St. Vincent, Macklemore

Sunday: Agrupación Capitán, Salvapantallas, Amalou, Clairo, Jorja Smith, Vicentico

Perry's Stage

Friday: Julio Victoria, Jetlag, Dak1llah, Omar Varela & Mykka, Seven Kayne – Bhavi, Hippie Sabotage, Khea, Valentino Khan, RL Grime, Zhu

Saturday: Coral Casino, Catnapp, Dano, Sita Abellán, Batalla de Los Gallos, C. Tangana, Loud Luxury, GTA, Don Diablo, Kshmr

Sunday: Naomi Preizler, Mexican Jihad & Tayhana, Metro Live, Bad Gyal, C.R.O. – Neo Pistea – Lucho SSJ, Gryffin, Cazzu, Kungs, Fisher, Dimitri Vegas & Like Mike

==== Lollapalooza Chile ====
Lollapalooza Chile 2019

Location: Parque O'Higgins, Santiago

Dates: March 29–31, 2019

VTR Stage

Friday: The Inspector Cluzo, Francisca Valenzuela, Snow Patrol, Greta Van Fleet, Kendrick Lamar

Saturday: Monsieur Periné, Ziggy Marley, Bring Me the Horizon, Interpol, Twenty One Pilots

Sunday: Fiskales Ad-Hok, Gepe, Juanes, The 1975, Arctic Monkeys

Banco de Chile Stage

Friday: Frank's White Canvas, LANY, Los Tres, Vicentico, Lenny Kravitz

Saturday: Zaturno & Sole, Kamasi Washington, Portugal. The Man, Years & Years, Post Malone

Sunday: Adelaida, La Vela Puerca, Troye Sivan, Foals, Sam Smith

Acer Stage

Friday: Playa Gótica, Bronko Yotte, Clairo, Jorja Smith, Paulo Londra

Saturday: Humboldt, Ases Falsos, The Fever 333, Protoje & The Indiggnation, Rüfüs Du Sol, Odesza

Sunday: Cigarbox Man, Caramelos de Cianuro, Parcels, Jain, Rosalía, St. Vincent, Macklemore

Perry's Stage by VTR

Friday: Sistek, Kidd Keo, MC Kevinho, Gryffin, Kungs, Fisher, Kshmr, Dimitri Vegas & Like Mike

Saturday: Flak, Bad Gyal, Jetlag, Hippie Sabotage, Valentino Khan, DJ Who, RL Grime, Steve Aoki

Sunday: Polimá Westcoast, Omar Varela, Khea, GTA, Loud Luxury, Don Diablo, Zhu, Tiësto

Lotus Stage

Friday: Drefquila, Amanitas, Green Valley, Caetano + Moreno + Zeca & Tom Veloso, Tokyo Ska Paradise Orchestra

Saturday: Gianluca, Tomasa del Real, Alemán, Paloma Mami, Pillanes, Américo

Sunday: iLe, Alika, C. Tangana, Joe Vasconcellos, La Floripondio

Aldea Verde Stage by Engie

Friday: Kaleema, Elkin Robinson, Chancha Vía Circuito, DJ Raff, Nicola Cruz, Satori

Saturday: Tribu Huni Kuin, Kingo Roots & Ras Kadhu, Julio Victoria, A. Chal, Rubio, Nova Materia, Booka Shade, Valesuchi

Sunday: Natalia Contesse, Keko Yoma, Newen Afrobeat, Seun Kuti, Batalla de Los Gallos, Ana Tijoux

Heineken Lounge Stage

Friday: Drunvaloop, Compadre, DJ Tressor, Red Rabbit, Melanie Ribbe, Fernanda Arrau

Saturday: Goldenrat, Isa Rojas, Pol de Sur, Entrópica, Satori, DJ Raff

Sunday: Jefe Indio, Marcela Thais, Sita Abellán, Fantasna, Valesuchi

==== Lollapalooza Brazil ====
Lollapalooza Brazil 2019

Location: Autódromo de Interlagos in São Paulo, Brazil

Dates: April 05–07, 2019

Budweiser Stage

Friday: Brvnks, Scalene, Foals, Tribalistas, Arctic Monkeys

Saturday: Carne Doce, Rashid, Snow Patrol, Lenny Kravitz, Kings of Leon

Sunday: Aláfia, BK', The Struts, Greta Van Fleet, Kendrick Lamar

Onix Stage

Friday: Autoramas, Portugal. The Man, The 1975, Sam Smith

Saturday: Catavento, Liniker e os Caramelows, Silva, Bring Me the Horizon, Post Malone

Sunday: E a Terra Nunca Me Pareceu Tão Distante, The Inspector Cluzo, Gabriel o Pensador, Interpol, Twenty One Pilots

Adidas Stage

Friday: Molho Negro, The Fever 333, Troye Sivan, St. Vincent, Macklemore

Saturday: Duda Beat, LANY, Jain, Jorja Smith, Odesza

Friday: Luiza Lian, Letrux, IZA, Rüfüs Du Sol, Years & Years

Perry's By Doritos

Friday: Maz, Elekfantz, Dashdot, Bruno Be, Loud Luxury, Fisher, Zhu, Kshmr, Tiësto

Saturday: Illusionize, Liu, Dubdogz feat. Vitor Kley, Chemical Surf, Gryffin, Valentino Khan, Vintage Culture, Kungs, Steve Aoki

Sunday: Pontifexx, Kvsh, Groove Delight, GTA, Bhaskar, Don Diablo, RL Grime, Dimitri Vegas & Like Mike

==== Lollapalooza Stockholm ====
Lollapalooza Stockholm 2019

Location: Gärdet, Stockholm, Sweden

Dates: June 28–30, 2019

Tower Stage

Friday: Lamix / Imenella, Molly Sandén, Brockhampton, Billie Eilish, Travis Scott

Saturday: Valeras, Mares, Denzel Curry, The 1975, Greta Van Fleet, Foo Fighters

Sunday: Lemaitre, Jacob Banks, MØ, Lykke Li, Chance the Rapper

Bay Stage

Friday: Junior Brielle, Alma, Norlie & KKV, Lil Baby, Lana Del Rey

Saturday: Mt. Joy, Dean Lewis, Hov1, The Hives, Laleh

Sunday: Becky and the Birds, Markus Krunegård, Tove Styrke, Young Thug, Lil Uzi Vert

Park Stage

Friday: DaniLeigh, Yungblud, Halestorm, Hurula, The Hellacopters

Saturday: Frank Carter & The Rattlesnakes, IAMDDB, Masego, Sheck Wes, Bring Me the Horizon

Sunday: Smith & Thell, Honne, Chevelle, Wolfmother, Perry Farrell's Kind Heaven Orchestra

Perry's Stage

Friday: Caroline Roxy, Steerner, Sandra Mosh, Josefin Rosén, Brohug, Valentino Khan, Kungs, Maya Jane Coles, Eric Prydz

Saturday: Gunn, Ehrling, Sylvain Armand, Off the Meds, Loud Luxury, Bassjackers, Rebecca & Fiona, Mike Perry, Alan Walker

Sunday: Annica, Æmma, TooManyLeftHands, La Fleur, Sebjak, Felix Jaehn, Dada Life, Otto Knows

==== Lollapalooza Paris ====
Lollapalooza Paris 2019

Location: Hippodrome de Longchamp in Paris, France

Dates: July 20–21, 2019

Main Stage 1

Saturday: Gus Dapperton, L.E.J, Kodaline, IAM, Twenty One Pilots
Sunday: Judah & the Lion, MØ, Roméo Elvis, Ben Harper & the Innocent Criminals, The Strokes

Main Stage 2

Saturday: Ghali, Metric, Jain, Orelsan, Martin Garrix
Sunday: Camélia Jordana, Clean Bandit, $uicideBoy$, Bad Bunny, Migos, Nekfeu

Alternative Stage

Saturday: Barny Fletcher, Kristina Bazan, Jaden Smith, Skip the Use, Tash Sultana, Perry Farrell's Kind Heaven Orchestra
Sunday: Kovacs, S.Pri Noir, Shame, Caravan Palace, Biffy Clyro, The 1975

Perry's Stage

Saturday: The Prince Karma, Gryffin, Dynoro, Alison Wonderland, 4B, B2B & Aazar, Kayzo, Getter, Kungs

Sunday: KLYMVX, K?d, Svdden Death B2B Must Die!, Habstrakt, Loud Luxury, Jonas Blue, Gud Vibrations VS Slugz Music (Nghtmre, Slander & Snails), Eric Prydz

==== Lollapalooza ====
Lollapalooza 2019

Location: Grant Park in Chicago, United States

Dates: August 1–4, 2019

T-Mobile Stage

Thursday: Max Frost, Ghostemane, H.E.R., Hozier, The Strokes
Friday: Picture This, Idles, 21 Savage, Janelle Monáe, Childish Gambino
Saturday: The Band Camino, Mondo Cozmo, Gary Clark Jr., Lil Wayne, Twenty One Pilots
Sunday: Wilderado, J.I.D, The Revivalists, Kacey Musgraves, Ariana Grande

Bud Light Stage

Thursday: YBN Cordae, Lennon Stella, Fitz and the Tantrums, RÜFÜS DU SOL, The Chainsmokers
Friday: Omar Apollo, Conan Gray, Maggie Rogers, Death Cab for Cutie, Tame Impala
Saturday: Sam Fender, Bad Suns, 6lack, Tenacious D, J Balvin
Sunday: Ryan Beatty, Dean Lewis, Louis the Child, Meek Mill, Flume

Tito's Handmade Vodka Stage

Thursday: Cousin Stizz, Emily King, Hobo Johnson & The Lovemakers, Lauren Daigle, Win and Woo
Friday: Dreamers, Boy Pablo, Japanese Breakfast, Chevelle, Baynk
Saturday: Magic City Hippies, Fantastic Negrito, Smino, AJR, Crizzly
Sunday: Malu Trevejo, Still Woozy, Francis and the Lights, Rosalía, Ilo Ilo

American Eagle Stage

Thursday: Jackie Foster, Beach Bunny, Shallou, Half Alive, Jeremy Zucker, Cautious Clay, Saba, FKJ, Lil Baby
Friday: Yoshi Flower, Calboy, Alec Benjamin, Tyla Yaweh, Tierra Whack, Honne, Whethan, Bishop Briggs, Bring Me the Horizon
Saturday: Age.Sex.Location, Slow Hollows, Bea Miller, Jade Bird, Pink Sweats, Chelsea Cutler, Yaeji, Gunna, Madeon
Sunday: 99 Neighbors, Bayonne, Slenderbodies, G Flip, Masego, Denzel Curry, Lane 8, Mitski, Perry Farrell's Kind Heaven Orchestra

BMI Stage

Thursday: Alexander 23, Ama Lou, Harry Hudson, Bad Child, GothBoiClique, Des Rocs
Friday: The New Respects, Against the Current, Tessa Violet, Roy Blair, Upsahl, Nothing,Nowhere
Saturday: Liily, Coi Leray, Russo, Witt Lowry, Role Model, Ruston Kelly
Sunday: Just Loud, Yeek, Illiterate Light, Tayla Parx, Yung Gravy, Bülow

Perry's Stage

Thursday: Willaris. K, Ducky (Live), Svdden Death, Clozee, Elephante, Fisher, Deorro, Gud Vibrations VS Slugz Music (Nghtmre, Slander & Snails)
Friday: Shlump, Charlesthefirst, Cray, Yultron, Said the Sky, Party Favor, Matoma, Snails, Alesso
Saturday: Lucas Dell'Abate, Wavedash, Diablo, Whipped Cream, Jonas Blue, Loud Luxury, Boombox Cartel, Gryffin, RL Grime
Sunday: Born Dirty, GG Magree, Opluo, CamelPhat, Diesel (Shaquille O'Neal), Manic Focus, San Holo, Sheck Wes

Ryan Lockwood Stage

Thursday: Normani, Evan Konrad, Killy, Hayley Kiyoko, King Princess
Friday: Shaed, The Nude Party, Sigrid, Rich the Kid, NF
Saturday: Houses, Men I Trust, Scarypoolparty, Lil Skies, Judah & the Lion
Sunday: Arkells, (Sandy) Alex G, Joji, Sharon Van Etten, Slash feat. Myles Kennedy and The Conspirators

VIP Lolla Lounge

Thursday: Emily King, Max Frost
Friday: Music from the cast of Hamilton, Bishop Briggs, Japanese Breakfast
Saturday: Ruston Kelly, Bad Suns

Sunday: Music from the cast of Hamilton

==== Lollapalooza Berlin ====
Lollapalooza Berlin 2019

Location: Olympiastadion and Olympiapark in Berlin, Germany

Dates: September 7–8, 2019

Main Stage North

Saturday: Querbeat, Tom Walker, Ufo361, Billie Eilish, Twenty One Pilots
Sunday: Eli, Dean Lewis, Olli Schulz, Khalid, Kings of Leon

Main Stage South

Saturday: Steiner & Madlaina, Sigrid, Dendemann, Marteria & Casper, Swedish House Mafia
Sunday: Allie X, Rita Ora, Hozier, Kraftklub

Perry's Stage

Saturday: Claptone, Gryffin, Hugel, Gramatik, Kungs, Scooter, Alan Walker, Underworld
Sunday: Lari Luke, Bart B More, TV Noise, LOOPERS, Eauxmar, Loud Luxury, Matoma, Don Diablo, Martin Garrix

Alternative Stage

Saturday: Ilira, Serpentwithfeet, Higher Brothers, Pale Waves, Roosevelt, Courtney Barnett, Princess Nokia, Parcels
Sunday: The Coronas, Granada, The Faim, Eno, Rex Orange County, Playboi Carti, Bausa, 6lack

Weingarten Stage

Saturday: Yoga, Rimon, Laoise, Mia Morgan, Lxandra, Big Joanie, Amilli

Sunday: Yoga, Korantemaa, Lilla Vargen, Ilgen-Nur, Sing Along Social, Pip Blom, Whenyoung, Harleighblu

=== 2020 ===
All editions of Lollapalooza were canceled in 2020 due to the COVID-19 pandemic.

==== Lollapalooza Stockholm (Canceled) ====
Lollapalooza Stockholm 2020 (Canceled)

Location: Gärdet in Stockholm, Sweden

Dates: June 26–28, 2020

Friday, June 26

- Post Malone
- Ellie Goulding
- Zara Larsson
- Galantis
- Of Monsters and Men
- Rex Orange County
- W&W
- Timbuktu & Damn!
- Jake Bugg
- Snoh Aalegra
- Deportees
- Oliver Heldens
- Zhu
- Tyla Yaweh
- Daniel Adams-Ray
- Regard
- Linda Pira
- Cassy

Saturday, June 27

- Pearl Jam
- The Killers
- Anderson Paak and the Free Nationals
- Rival Sons
- Miriam Bryant
- Fricky
- Idles
- Jireel
- Dimitri Vangelis & Wyman
- Graveyard
- Jimmy Eat World
- Alec Benjamin
- Martin Jensen
- The Pretty Reckless
- Victor Leksell
- Krewella
- Jubël
- Lady Bee
- Rothwell
- Ask:Me

Sunday, June 28

- Kendrick Lamar
- Camila Cabello
- Kacey Musgraves
- Nina Kraviz
- Mando Diao
- GoldLink
- Sigrid
- Banks
- Sabina Ddumba
- Felix Sandman
- Sam Feldt (Live)
- Santi
- Movitz!
- Estraden
- Tigerlily
- Skiy
- Frida Lundemo

==== Lollapalooza Paris (Canceled) ====
Lollapalooza Paris 2020 (Canceled)

Location: Hippodrome Longchamp in Paris, France

Dates: July 18–19, 2020

Saturday, July 18

- Billie Eilish
- Khalid
- Vald
- Rita Ora
- Vini Vici
- The Struts
- Jessie J
- Joe Dwet File
- Fever 333
- Finneas
- Herobust B2B Spag Heddy
- Sabrina Claudio
- Said the Sky
- Talisco
- Bbno$
- Maazel

Sunday, July 19

- Pearl Jam
- Vampire Weekend
- Burna Boy
- Haim
- Illenium
- Rezz
- Alec Benjamin
- Little Simz
- Rüfüs Du Sol
- Klingande
- GRiZ
- Subtronics B2B Boogie T
- Whipped Cream
- Asdek

==== Lollapalooza Berlin (Canceled) ====
Lollapalooza Berlin 2020 (Canceled)

Location: Olympiastadion and Olympiapark in Berlin, Germany

Dates: September 5–6, 2020

- Rage Against the Machine
- Miley Cyrus
- AnnenMayKantereit
- Deichkind
- DJ Snake
- Apache 207
- Die Antwoord
- Alligatoah
- Run the Jewels
- Timmy Trumpet
- Lost Frequencies
- $uicideboy$
- Blackbear
- Denzel Curry
- Madeon (DJ set)
- Mabel
- Loredana
- Moka Efti Orchestra
- J.I.D
- Wallows
- Alle Farben
- Walking on Cars
- Alice Merton
- R3hab
- Neelix
- Sophie Hunger
- Bishop Briggs
- You Me at Six
- Kayzo
- Drunken Masters
- Gryffin
- Beabadoobee
- David Puentez
- Eunique
- Keke
- Ebow
- Gianni Mae
- Novaa
- Los Bitchos
- Moli
- Layla
- Sofia Portanet

==== Lollapalooza Brazil (Canceled) ====
Lollapalooza Brazil 2020 (Canceled)

Location: Autódromo de Interlagos in São Paulo, Brazil

Dates: December 4–6, 2020

- Guns N' Roses
- Travis Scott
- The Strokes
- Lana Del Rey
- Martin Garrix
- Gwen Stefani
- Armin van Buuren
- Vampire Weekend
- Cage the Elephant
- James Blake
- The Lumineers
- Brockhampton
- Alan Walker
- Illenium
- Rezz
- LP
- Rita Ora
- Kacey Musgraves
- Rex Orange County
- Madeon
- Chris Lake
- A Day to Remember
- Charli XCX
- City and Colour
- Perry Farrell's Kind Heaven Orchestra
- R3hab
- King Princess
- Hayley Kiyoko
- Jaden Smith
- Lauv
- Pabllo Vittar
- Emicida
- Djonga
- Kali Uchis
- Silva
- Cat Dealers
- Chemical Surf
- Rashid
- Denzel Curry
- AJR
- Victor Lou
- Goldfish
- Fresno
- Evokings
- Fancy Inc
- Jão
- San Holo
- The Hu
- Vinne
- Ashibah
- Mika
- Fractall x Rocksted
- Idles
- Yungblud
- Terno Rei
- Clarice Falcão
- Menores Atos
- Wallows
- Two Feet
- Masego
- MC Tha
- Boombox Cartel
- Jetlag
- Beowülf
- Barja
- Fatnotronic
- Malifoo
- Edgar
- 509-E
- WC No Beat
- Ludmilla
- Kevin o Chris
- Haikaiss
- Filipe Ret
- PK
- Felp 22

==== Lollapalooza Argentina (Canceled) ====
Lollapalooza Argentina 2020 (Canceled)

Location: Hipódromo San Isidro in Buenos Aires, Argentina.

Dates: November 27–29, 2020

- Guns N' Roses
- Travis Scott
- The Strokes
- Lana Del Rey
- Martin Garrix
- Gwen Stefani
- Armin van Buuren
- Vampire Weekend
- Cage the Elephant
- James Blake
- Brockhampton
- Alan Walker
- Illenium
- Rezz
- Ratones Paranoicos
- Duki
- The Lumineers
- Kacey Musgraves
- Rex Orange County
- Rita Ora
- A Day to Remember
- Charli XCX
- Perry Farrell's Kind Heaven Orchestra
- Madeon
- King Princess
- LP
- Jaden Smith
- Litto Nebbia
- Hayley Kiyoko
- WOS
- Lauv
- Airbag
- Él Mató a un Policía Motorizado
- Nathy Peluso
- Rels B
- Emmanuel Horvilleur
- Denzel Curry
- Kali Uchis
- Paloma Mami
- Mika
- Chris Lake
- R3hab
- J Mena
- Yungblud
- Kaydy Cain
- Pabllo Vittar
- YSY A
- Bizarrap
- AJR
- Two Feet
- Fabiana Cantilo
- San Holo
- Fuego
- Amaia
- Emilia
- Yung Beef
- Idles
- Trueno
- Dani
- Wallows
- Masego
- La Delio Valdez
- The Hu
- Zoe Gotusso
- Elsa y Elmar
- Girl Ultra
- Natalie Perez
- Las Ligas Menores
- Maye
- Ainda
- Ghetto Kids
- Goldfish
- Cimafunk
- Boombox Cartel
- Ms Nina
- Feli Colina
- D3fai
- Florian
- Lucia Tacchetti
- Axel Fiks
- Miranda Johansen
- Paco Leiva
- Dabow
- Metro Live
- DJ SKY
- Limon
- Alejo y Valentin
- El Buen Salvaje
- Louly
- Reydel

=== 2021 ===
The Stockholm, Paris, and Brasil editions of the festival were also canceled in 2021 due to the COVID-19 pandemic.

==== Lollapalooza ====
Lollapalooza 2021

Location: Grant Park in Chicago, United States

Dates: July 29 – August 1, 2021

T-Mobile Stage

Thursday: Aly & AJ, Orville Peck, Black Pumas, Playboi Carti, Miley Cyrus
Friday: Gus Dapperton, Grandson, Giveon, Roddy Ricch, Tyler, the Creator
Saturday: Cannons, The Backseat Lovers, Young the Giant, Megan Thee Stallion, Post Malone
Sunday: Sir Chloe, Princess Nokia, G Herbo, Modest Mouse, Foo Fighters

Bud Light Seltzer Stage

Thursday: Ant Clemons, Olivia O'Brien, Jimmy Eat World, Kaytranada, Illenium
Friday: Tai Verdes, Mick Jenkins, Polo G, Lauv, Marshmello
Saturday: Jessia, Trevor Daniel, Trippie Redd, Limp Bizkit, Journey
Sunday: Music in the Key of Chicago, Peach Tree Rascals, Jxdn, Brockhampton, Young Thug

Tito's Homemade Vodka Stage

Thursday: Post Animal, Ed Maverick, LP, All Time Low, Sebastian Paul
Friday: Rookie, Black Pistol Fire, Cam, Arizona Zervas, Brownies & Lemonade All-Stars
Saturday: Dante Elephante, Porches, Mt. Joy, Whitney, Jake Duby
Sunday: Brooke Alexx, Sofía Valdés, RMR, Brittany Howard, Surfaces, Nez

Grubhub Stage

Thursday: Tristan Simone, Night Lovell, Almost Monday, Clever, Flo Milli, Paris Texas, Ashe, Lunay, Oliver Tree
Friday: Renforshort, Mob Rich, Njomza, Jawny, Emotional Oranges, Elohim, Boy Pablo, AG Club, Omar Apollo
Saturday: Glove, Laundry Day, Michigander, Bia, Drama, Tate McRae, Cavetown, Iann Dior, Marc Rebillet
Sunday: The Aquadolls, Radkey, Noga Erez, Elderbrook, Mxmtoon, JPEGMafia, Rico Nasty, EarthGang, Big Wild

BMI Stage

Thursday: Julian LaMadrid, Taylor Janzen, Motherfolk, Hoko, Absofacto, Migrant Motel
Friday: Jake Wesley Rogers, Kenny Mason, Sa-Roc, Elephant Heart, Contradash, Mothica
Saturday: Sophie Cates, Rence, Joy Oladokun, Kid Quill, Serena Isioma, Phem
Sunday: Shy Carter, Neal Francis, Sarah Barrios, Ottto, Ant Saunders, Riz La Vie

Solana x Perry's Stage

Thursday: DJ Mel, Blossom, Justin Jay, Dombresky, Saymyname, Cash Cash, Tchami, Steve Aoki
Friday: Level Up, Chomppa, Dabin, Wooli, Riot Ten, Subtronics, Jauz, Suicideboys
Saturday: Kooze, Wenzday, Vnssa, Cid, Vintage Culture, Lost Kings, Oliver Heldens, Slander
Sunday: Moore Kismet, LP Giobbi, William Black, Dr. Fresch, Sullivan King, Peekaboo, Yellow Claw, Alison Wonderland

Lake Shore Stage

Thursday: Christian French, MAX, Dayglow, Saint Jhn, Kim Petras
Friday: Oston, Tobi Lou, Jacob Banks, White Reaper, Jack Harlow
Saturday: Jac Ross, Monophonics, Cautious Clay, Freddie Gibbs, Angels & Airwaves

Sunday: Chiiild, Flipp Dinero, Toosii, The Front Bottoms, Band of Horses

=== 2022 ===
==== Lollapalooza Argentina ====
Lollapalooza Argentina 2022

Location: Hipódromo de San Isidro, Buenos Aires, Argentina

Dates: March 18–20, 2022

Flow Stage

Friday: Rosario Ortega, Bruses, Tai Verdes, Emilia, Wos, C. Tangana, Miley Cyrus
Saturday: Chiara Parravicini, Clara Cava, Jxdn, Él Mató a un Policía Motorizado, Nicki Nicole, Machine Gun Kelly, The Strokes
Sunday: Malena Villa, Las Ligas Menores, The Wombats, Idles, Jane's Addiction, Foo Fighters

Samsung Stage

Friday: Limon, Zenon Pereyra, Chita, Louta, A Day to Remember, Duki, A$AP Rocky, Bizarrap
Saturday: Wiranda Johansen, Derby Motoreta's Burrito Kachimba, King Gizzard & the Lizard Wizard, Litto Nebbia, Khea, Doja Cat, Alan Walker
Sunday: BB Asul, Celli, Sen Senra, Alessia Cara, Tiago PZK, Babasónicos, Martin Garrix

Alternative Stage

Friday: Ainda, Axel Fiks, Natalie Perez, Seven Kayne, 070 Shake, Marina, Airbag, Turnstile
Saturday: Molok0, Girl Ultra, Marc Segui, Lola Índigo, LP, Kehlani, Jack Harlow
Sunday: Simona, Paula Cendejas, Remi Wolf, Emmanuel Horvilleur, L-Gante, Jhay Cortez

Perry's Stage

Friday: Bianca Lif, Falke 912, FMS, La Joaqui, Sael, Dillom, Boombox Cartel, Alok, Deorro, Alesso
Saturday: Lucia Tacchetti, Ghetto Kids, D3fai, Kiddo Toto, Taichu, FMS, Dani Ribba, Pabllo Vittar, Ashnikko, Chris Lake, Justin Quiles

Sunday: Reydel, Ronpe 99', Six Sex, Saramalacara, Luck Ra, FMS, Acru, Goldfish, Alan Gomez & DJ Tao & Kaleb Di Masi, Channel Tres, Kaytranada

==== Lollapalooza Chile ====
Lollapalooza Chile 2022

Location: Parque Bicentenario de Cerrillos in Santiago, Chile

Dates: March 18–20, 2022

VTR Stage

Friday: The Alive, The Wombats, Idles, Jane's Addiction, Foo Fighters
Saturday: Tiro de Gracia, Javiera y Los Imposibles, Turnstile, Cami, Miley Cyrus
Sunday: Drefquila, Kramer, LP, Machine Gun Kelly, The Strokes

Banco de Chile Stage

Friday: Flor de Rap, Bocho, Marky Ramone, Cultura Profética, Martin Garrix
Saturday: Soul de Lua, Rawayana, Tai Verdes, A Day to Remember, A$AP Rocky
Sunday: Mariel Mariel, Jxdn, Nicki Nicole, Doja Cat

Perry's Stage by VTR

Friday: Kidd Tetoon, Harry Nach, Pabllo Vittar, Polimá Westcoast & Galee Galee, Trueno, Justin Quiles, Channel Tres, Kaytranada
Saturday: Jotape Psycho, Jesse Baez, Boombox Cartel, Ceaese, Pablo Chill-E, Goldfish, Deorro, Alesso
Sunday: Ghetto Kids, Power Peralta, Princesa Alba, Marcianeke, Alok, Ashnikko, Chris Lake, Alan Walker

AXE Stage

Friday: Fernando Milagros, Remi Wolf, Alessia Cara, Alexisonfire, Jhay Cortez
Saturday: Slowkiss, Bbs Paranoicos, Beto Cuevas, Marina, Tiago PZK
Sunday: Cimafunk, Marc Segui, 070 Shake, Kehlani, King Gizzard & the Lizard Wizard, Jack Harlow

Lotus Stage

Friday: Delic, Dulce y Agraz, Totó la Momposina, Paula Cendejas, Camila Moreno
Saturday: Soulfia, Hoppo!, Rubio, Pedropiedra, Javiera Mena
Sunday: Girl Ultra, DJ Bitman, C-Funk, Lucybell, Inti Histórico Quilapayún

Aldea Verde Stage by Engie

Friday: Antónima, Temple Agents, Francisco Victoria, Saiko
Saturday: Liz Santibañez, Catana, Redbull Batalla, Yorka, Pascuala Ilabaca y Fauna

Sunday: Nakeye, Silvestre y la Naranja, BMF Squad, Micro TDH, Golden Dawn Arkestra

==== Lollapalooza Brazil ====
Lollapalooza Brazil 2022

Location: Autódromo de Interlagos, São Paulo, Brazil

Dates: March 25–27, 2022

Budweiser Stage

Friday: Detonautas Roque Clube, Turnstile, LP, Machine Gun Kelly, The Strokes
Saturday: Terno Rei, Silva, King Gizzard & the Lizard Wizard, Emicida, Miley Cyrus
Sunday: Lagum, Rashid, Idles, Jane's Addiction

Onix Stage

Friday: 89FM, Jxdn, The Wombats, Marina, Doja Cat
Saturday: Lamparina, Clarice Falcão, Jão, A Day to Remember, A$AP Rocky
Sunday: Aliados, Fresno, Black Pumas, Martin Garrix

Adidas Stage

Friday: Edgar, Matuê, Pabllo Vittar, Caribou, Jack Harlow
Saturday: MC Tha, Jup do Bairro, Remi Wolf, Alessia Cara, Alexisonfire
Sunday: Menores Atos, Planta e Raiz, Marina Sena, Djonga, Kehlani

Perry's by Doritos

Friday: Beowulf, Barja, Meca, Vinne, Jetlag, 070 Shake, Ashnikko, Chris Lake, Alan Walker
Saturday: Fatnotronic, Ashibah, Victor Lou, Chemical Surf, DJ Marky, Boombox Cartel, WC No Beat, Deorro, Alok

Sunday: Fractall x Rocksted, Malifoo, Evokings, Fancy Inc, Cat Dealers, Goldfish, Kaytranada, Gloria Groove, Alesso

==== Lollapalooza ====
Lollapalooza Chicago 2022

Location: Grant Park in Chicago, United States

Dates: July 28–31, 2022

T-Mobile

Thursday: Underscores, Maude Latour, Still Woozy, Billy Strings, Metallica
Friday: JORDY, Rolling Blackouts Coastal Fever, Cordae, Glass Animals, Dua Lipa
Saturday: Cochise, Fletcher, Wallows, Big Sean, J. Cole
Sunday: De'Wayne, Zoe Wees, Måneskin, Porno for Pyros, Green Day

Bud Light Seltzer

Thursday: Last Dinosaurs, Inhaler, Tove Lo, Jasmine Sullivan, Lil Baby
Friday: Jasiah, Mahalia, Royal Blood, Don Toliver, Machine Gun Kelly
Saturday: Crawlers, Griff, Blxst, Idles, Kygo
Sunday: Erica Banks, Djo, Charli XCX, The Kid Laroi, J-Hope

Discord

Thursday: Tony Velour, Niko Rubio, Midwxst, Petey, Zach Bryan, Pi'erre Bourne, Remi Wolf, Maxo Kream, Caroline Polachek
Friday: Aiida, Flipturn, KayCyy, Wet Leg, Genesis Owusu, Muna, Glaive, SoFaygo, Bob Moses
Saturday: Calder Allen, Pom Pom Squad, Coco & Clair Clair, Gracie Abrams, Duckwrth, Mariah the Scientist, Turnstile, Willow
Sunday: Chicago Made Showcase, Blackstarkids, Teezo Touchdown, Claire Rosinkranz, KennyHoopla, Young Nudy, PinkPantheress, Dominic Fike, Polo & Pan

Tito's Handmade Vodka

Thursday: Redveil, Sam Fender, Role Model, 100 gecs, Com3t
Friday: Jackie Hayes, Baby Tate, The Regrettes, King Princess, David Solomon
Saturday: Charm La'Donna, Alexander 23, Larry June, Coin, Charly Jordan
Sunday: Horsegirl, The Marías, Local Natives, Lucille Croft

Coinbase

Thursday: Emmy Meli, Sampa the Great, The Wombats, Manchester Orchestra, Ashnikko
Friday: La Doña, Del Water Gap, Tinashe, Coi Leray, Girl in Red
Saturday: Ericdoa, Hinds, Dashboard Confessional, YG, Chelsea Cutler
Sunday: Low Cut Connie, Audrey Nuna, Goth Babe, Beach Bunny, Banks

BMI

Thursday: Mills, Willie Jones, Jesse Jo Stark, Giovanne and the Hired Guns, Rosie, Lorna Shore
Friday: Daisy the Great, Taipei Houston, Gata, Elhae, Binki, Rawayana
Saturday: Sam Austins, Meet Me at the Altar, DannyLux, Prentiss, BabyJake, Gayle
Sunday: Trella, Buffalo Nichols, LØLØ, Peter Cottontale, India Shawn, Dylan

Solana x Perry's

Thursday: Young Franco, Jubilee, Bijou, TSHA, Chris Lorenzo, MK, Black Coffee, Zhu
Friday: Biicala, Fiin, Maddy O'Neal, Whipped Cream, Wreckno, LP Giobbi, Clozee, Liquid Stranger, Rezz
Saturday: Bucky Cheds, Steller, Grabitz, Evan Giia, Surf Mesa, Jax Jones, Sidepiece, Duke Dumont, Lil Durk, Tomorrow X Together, Kaskade

Sunday: Zookeper, Hannah Wants, Habstrakt, James Hype, ATLiens, Gordo, John Summit, Denzel Curry

==== Lollapalooza Stockholm ====
Lollapalooza Stockholm 2022

Location: Gärdet, Stockholm, Sweden

Dates: July 1–3, 2022

Tower Stage

Friday: Rhys, Modest Mouse, Anitta, Polo G, Imagine Dragons
Saturday: A36, Mitski, Tove Lo, The Kid Laroi, Post Malone
Sunday: White Reaper, Wolf Alice, Miriam Bryant, Lewis Capaldi, Pearl Jam

Bay Stage

Friday: The K's, Grandson, Timbuktu & Damn!, Måneskin, Alesso
Saturday: Peach Tree Rascals, Zoe Wess, Glass Animals, Benjamin Ingrosso, Veronica Maggio
Sunday: Grant, Turnstile, Idles, Haim, Lorde

Park Stage

Friday: Anna of the North, Mother Mother, Remi Wolf, Jimmy Eat World, Kaleo, Jack Harlow
Saturday: Birkir Blær & Tusse, Mimi Webb, Molly Hammar, Rico Nasty, Little Jinder, Goldlink
Sunday: Jerry Cantrell, Sigrid, Graveyard, Biffy Clyro

Perry's Stage

Friday: Lady Bee, Riton, Broiler, Jonas Blue, Joel Corry, Will Sparks
Saturday: DJ Eddie Murphy, Oskar Syk, Tjalan, Zhu, Jübel, Purple Disco Machine, Meduza, Nina Kraviz
Sunday: Emerald, Ask:Me, Shouse, Dmitri Vangelis & Wyman, Dillon Francis, Galantis

The Circus

Friday: Teddy Failure, Oliver Malcolm, Jána, Hannes
Saturday: Aziya, Casper The Ghost, Miynt, Glaive, Nea
Sunday: Owenn, You Thant, Ellen Kraus, Kennyhoopla, Lova, Oscar Zia

Kidzapalooza Stage

Friday: GUL, Vattenmannen & Speed, Bland Drakar & Dragqueens
Saturday: Sångsommar med Ayla, Tigern & Kobran, Varat

Sunday: Nalle Clown har fjärilar i magen, Känslolåtarna med Alva Klum, Prova-på Capoeria

==== Lollapalooza Paris ====
Lollapalooza Paris 2022

Location: Hippodrome de Longchamp, Paris, France

Dates: July 16–17, 2022

Main West

Saturday: Tai Verdes, Modest Mouse, Tai Verdes, Joé Dwèt Filé, Anitta, Imagine Dragons
Sunday: White Reaper, Highly Suspect, Phoebe Bridgers, Maneskin, Pearl Jam

Main East

Saturday: Owenn, Yendry, PinkPantheress, Jack Harlow, Vald, David Guetta
Sunday: The Last Internationale, Princess Nokia, Tems, Megan Thee Stallion, A$AP Rocky

Alternative Stage

Saturday: Faouzia, P.R2B, The Struts, Fever 333, Bilal Hassani
Sunday: Pas Sages, Fanzine, Turnstile, Little Simz, Tayc

Perry's Stage

Saturday: ASDEK, Bizarrap, Sullivan King, Apashe, Vladimir Cauchemar, Malaa, Vini Vici
Sunday: Maazel, Moore Kismet, To/Die/For, Contrebande, Subtronics, Joyryde, Kavinsky, Illenium

Radar Stage

Saturday: Thaanos, Bakari, Gambino La Mg, Arma Jackson, Tiakola, Poupie, L'or Du Commun, Josman
Sunday: Dyk, Juste Shani, Nahir, Le Juice, Frenetik, Gambi, Deen Burbigo, Guy2Bezbar

Kidzapalooza Stage

Saturday: Daphne Brixton, Ô C'est Nous, Isambourg, Stiles Brisson

Sunday: Oscar les Vacances, Mimmaa, Pas Sages

=== 2023 ===
==== Lollapalooza ====
Lollapalooza Chicago 2023

Location: Grant Park in Chicago, United States

Dates: Aug 3–6, 2023

Bud Light

Thursday: The Beaches, Joy Oladokun, Sofi Tukker, Carly Rae Jepsen, Karol G
Friday: Sincere Engineer, Ekkstacy, Big Wild, Thirty Seconds to Mars, The 1975
Saturday: Pardyalone, Tom Odell, Sylvan Esso, Maggie Rogers, Tomorrow X Together
Sunday: Upsahl, Neil Frances, Lil Yachty, Rina Sawayama, Lana Del Rey

Tito's Handmade Vodka

Thursday: Pony Bradshaw, Clinton Kane, Franc Moody, Noah Kahan, Carola
Friday: Junior Mesa, Giant Rooks, Beabadoobee, Foals, Ninajirachi
Saturday: Friday Pilots Club, The Linda Lindas, Iván Cornejo, Niki, Benson
Sunday: Husbands, Bakar, Gabriels, Joey Bada$$, Ian Asher

Bacardí

Thursday: Lesly Reynaga, Finish Ticket, Richy Mitch & the Coal Miners, Ax and the Hatchetmen, Jessie Murph, Brakence, Men I Trust, Key Glock, The Rose
Friday: Tyler Christian, Cydeways, Loveless, Cafuné, Sueco, The 502s, Declan McKenna, Ken Carson, Knocked Loose
Saturday: Usted Senalemelo, Arlie, Mavi, Suki Waterhouse, Jean Dawson, Morgan Wade, Alex G, The Garden
Sunday: Chicago Made, Little Stranger, Ella Jane, Michelle, Holly Humberstone, UMI, Poolside, DPR Ian + DPR Live, L'Impératrice

BMI

Thursday: Arath Herce, Beauty School Dropout, Austin Meade, Chri$tian Gate$, Isabel Larosa, Kidd Kenn
Friday: Hemlocke Springs, Somadina, Annie DiRusso, Charolotte Sands, Talk, TiaCorine
Saturday: Los Aptos, Arcy Drive, Windser, Danielle Ponder, Aidan Bisset, Ari Abdul
Sunday: Harry Edohoukwa, The Red Clay Strays, Big Boss Vette, Josh Fudge, Madeline Edwards, Rosa Linn

Kidzapalooza

Thursday: Elena Moon Park, School of Rock, The Happiness Club, Divinity Roxx
Friday: Divinity Roxx, Elena Moon Park, The Happiness Club, School of Rock
Saturday: Alphabet Rockers, Sam Moran, Imagination Movers, Special Guest, Q Brothers
Sunday: Sam Moran, Imagination Movers, Q Brothers, Special Guest, Alphabet Rockers

Perry's

Thursday: Carola, Disco Lines, J. Worra, Acraze, Timmy Trumpet, Dom Dolla, Diplo
Friday: Ninajirachi, Hairitage, Blanke, Ray Volpe, Emo Nite, Armnhmr, Diesel, Svdden Death, Subtronics
Saturday: Benson, Remk, Bonnie X Clyde, Knock2, Solardo, AC Slater, Nora En Pure, Meduza, Pusha T
Sunday: Ian Asher, Dillon Nathaniel, Matroda, Wax Motif, Gorgon City, Afrojack, Alan Walker, Louis the Child

Coinbase

Thursday: Bad Neighbors, Dope Lemon, Spacey Jane, Rema, Lainey Wilson
Friday: Loviet, Band-Maid, Peach Pit, Sabrina Carpenter, Jessie Reyez
Saturday: Hoosh, Zack Fox, The Knocks, Destroy Lonely, Yung Gravy
Sunday: Sarah Kinsley, The Happy Fits, Magdalena Bay, Maisie Peters, The Backseat Lovers

T-Mobile

Thursday: Matt Maltese, Lovejoy, NewJeans, Portugal. The Man, Billie Eilish
Friday: Skizzy Mars, Sudan Archives, Tems, Fred Again..., Kendrick Lamar
Saturday: Motherfolk, Thee Sacred Souls, The Revivalists, J.I.D, Odesza
Sunday: Ingrid Andress, Dehd, Mt. Joy, A Boogie wit da Hoodie, Red Hot Chili Peppers

==== Lollapalooza Argentina ====
- Location: Hipódromo de San Isidro, Buenos Aires, Argentina
- Date: 17–19 March 2023

Flow Stage
Friday	Saturday	Sunday
Drake; Chano; Tove Lo; Dante Spinetta; Silvestre y La Naranja; An Espil; Nani	Twenty One Pilots; The 1975; Usted Señalemelo; Yungblud; 1915; Florian	Billie Eilish; María Becerra; Diego Torres; Cami; Gauchito Club; Odd Mami; Mia Zeta
Samsung Stage
Armin van Buuren; Rosalía; Trueno; Aurora; Suki Waterhouse; The Change; Plastilina	Jamie xx; Tame Impala; Jane's Addiction; Wallows; Nafta; Friolento; Melanie Williams & El Cabloide	Skrillex; Lil Nas X; Kali Uchis; Conan Gray; Mother Mother; León Cordero; Camilú
Alternative Stage
Cigarettes After Sex; Marilina Bertoldi; The Rose; Guitarricadelafuente; Paz Carrara; Guillermo Beresñak	Melanie Martinez; Catupecu Machu; Sofi Tukker; Elsa y Elmar; Kchiporros; Delfina Campos	Rise Against; Polo & Pan; Modest Mouse; Hot Milk; Judeline; Connie Isla; Mora Navarro
Perry's Stage
Alison Wonderland; John Summit; Danny Ocean; Álvaro Díaz; Young Miko; Villano Antillano; Oscu; Flaca; Panther	Bresh; Purple Disco Machine; Fred again..; Mora; Nora En Pure; Rusowsky + Ralphie Choo; Ryan Castro; Papichamp; Broke Carrey; Sassyggirl	Claptone; Gorgon City; Tokischa; Callejero Fino; Gera MX; Rei; Rojuu; Muerejoven; OH!DULCEARi; Soui Uno

- Twenty One Pilots replaced headliner Blink-182 who cancelled due to drummer Travis Barker's injury.

==== Lollapalooza Chile ====
- Location: Parque Cerrillos, Santiago, Chile
- Date: 17–19 March 2023

Costanera Center Stage
Friday	Saturday	Sunday
Billie Eilish; Kali Uchis; Mother Mother; Usted Señalemelo; Pailita; Sofía Gabanna	Drake; Tove Lo; Pettinellis; Young Gister; El Kuelgue; Stailok	Twenty One Pilots; The 1975; Wallows; Álex Anwandter; Spiral Vortex
Banco de Chile Stage
Lil Nas X; Conan Gray; Mora; Conociendo Rusia; Elsa y Elmar	Rosalía; Aurora; Danny Ocean; Louta; Villano Antillano	Tame Impala; Jane's Addiction; Yungblud; OTTTO
AXE Stage
Rise Against; Polo & Pan; Modest Mouse; Hot Milk; Friolento; Chini.png	Cigarettes After Sex; The Rose; Suki Waterhouse; Marilina Bertoldi; Benito Cerati; Masquemusica	Melanie Martinez; Lit Killah; Sofi Tukker; Pánico; Nano Stern; Plumas
Perry's Stage by Costanera Center
Claptone; Gorgon City; Tokischa; Ryan Castro; Nora En Pure; Rojuu; Dillom; Shirel; Loyaltty	Armin Van Buuren; Alison Wonderland; John Summit; Cris MJ; Young Miko; Madds; Melanie Ribbe; Red Bull Batalla; Baus	Jamie xx; Purple Disco Machine; Fred again..; Álvaro Díaz; YSY A; DT.Bilardo; King Savagge; Pablito Pesadilla; RVYO
Aldea Verde Stage
Vicente Cifuentes; Angelo Pierattini; Francisco, el Hombre; Tom D. Rocka; El Cruce	Ases Falsos; Benjamín Walker; Yael Meyer; Clemente; Código Abierto	Alain Johannes Trio; Gufi; Malamen; Alectrofobia; Samsara

==== Lollapalooza Brasil ====
Lollapalooza Brasil 2023

Location: Autódromo de Interlagos, São Paulo

Dates: March 24–26, 2023

Budweiser Stage
Friday: Aliados, Baby, Anavitória, Mother Mother, Kali Uchis, Billie Eilish
Saturday: Mulamba, Tássia Reis, Ludmilla, Wallows, The 1975, Twenty One Pilots
Sunday: Larissa Luz, Rashid, Willow, Tove Lo

Chevrolet Stage
Friday: Brisa Flow, Black Alien, Modest Mouse, Conan Gray, Lil Nas X
Saturday: Medulla, Gilsons, Yungblud, Jane's Addiction, Tame Impala
Sunday: Number Teddie, Tuyo, Os Paralamas do Sucesso, Aurora, Rosalía

Adidas Stage
Friday: Gab Ferreira, Planta & Raiz, Suki Waterhouse, Hot Milk, Polo & Pan, Rise Against
Saturday: Ana Frango Elétrico, Carol Biazin, Pitty, Filipe Ret, Sofi Tukker, Melanie Martinez
Sunday: Black Pantera, O Grilo, The Rose, L7NNON, Cigarettes After Sex

Perry's by Johnnie Walker Blonde
Friday: Curol, Aline Rocha, Madds, Öwnboss, Devochka, Nora En Pure, Pedro Sampaio, John Summit, Gorgon City, Claptone
Saturday: Valentina Luz, Melanie Ribbe, Binaryh, D-Nox, Eli Iwasa, Almanac, Liu, Mochakk, Purple Disco Machine, Jamie xx

Sunday: Carol Seubert, Camilla Brunetta, Deekapz, Carola, Santti, Rooftime, Dubdogz x KVSH, Fred again.., Alison Wonderland, Armin van Buuren

==== Lollapalooza Stockholm ====
- Location: Gärdet, Stockholm, Sweden
- Date: 29 June–1 July 2023

Tower Stage
Friday	Saturday	Sunday
Travis Scott; Miss Li; L'Impératrice; CHINCHILLA; KayCyy	Lizzo; Thomas Stenström; Daniela Rathana; Maisie Peters; Olivia Lobato	Mumford & Sons; The 1975; Victor Leksell; Vargas and Lagola; Estraden
Bay Stage
Kygo; The Rose; Sabrina Carpenter; Molly Hammar; Hot Milk	Zara Larsson; Dean Lewis; Omar Sheriff; Bbno$; Skaiwater	Lil Nas X; OneRepublic; Japanese Breakfast; Cornelia Jakobs; Indigo De Souza
Park Stage
Mando Diao; YG; Sticky Fingers; Baby Queen; Parham; Debbie	Deportees; Marcus Mumford; King Princess; Destroy Lonely; Inhaler; Iann Dior; Holly Humberstone	JID; Red Bull Ord mot Ord; Ken Carson; Maja Francis; beabadoobee; Peg Parnevik; Hannah Grae
Perry's Stage
Fatboy Slim; Vintage Culture; Sam Feldt; Sofi Tukker; Bru-C; Pretty Pink; Caroline Roxy; Alberto Canas	Afrojack; Alok; Don Diablo; Icona Pop; Mika Zibanejad; Austin Millz; Ashibah; Oskar Syk	Timmy Trumpet; Oliver Heldens; Becky Hill; Ofenbach; TooManyLeftHands; Juicy M; Peggy Gou; Victor Fridh; Valerio Sinatra

==== Lollapalooza Paris ====
Lollapalooza Paris 2023

Location: Hippodrome de Paris Longchamp, Paris

Dates: July 21–23, 2023

Main West
Friday: Stray Kids, Lindsey Stirling, The Lathums, Zoe Wees
Saturday: Rosalía, Niall Horan, Kaleo, Dylan, Hot Milk
Sunday: Kendrick Lamar, Central Cee, Ava Max, Lovejoy, CHINCHILLA

Main East
Friday: Damso, Niska, ElGrandeToto, Manal
Saturday: Kygo, Lil Nas X, JID, Nicki Nicole, Mimi Webb
Sunday: Aya Nakamura, OneRepublic, CKay, KO KO MO, MDNS

Alternative Stage
Friday: Dean Lewis, Maisie Peters, Picture This, Madlen Keys
Saturday: Royal Republic, The Driver Era, Only The Poets, Doya, Kriill
Sunday: The Inspector Cluzo, John Butler, Tokischa, High Vis, Lémofil

Perry's Stage
Friday: Rezz, Deathpact, Dirtyphonics, Gentlemens Club, Imanu B2B The Caracal Project, Koos
Saturday: Svdden Death, Clozee, Peekaboo, DJ Diesel, William Blanke, Nitepunk, Biicla
Sunday: Slander, San Holo, Knock2, Tony Romera, Mosimann, Bleu Clair, KL!P

Hip Hop Stage
Friday: Monsieur Nov, Doria, Bekar, Prinzly, Beendo Z
Saturday: SDM, Makala, Prince Waly, Nahir, 2th

Sunday: So La Lune, James BKS, Benjamin Epps, Bianca Costa, Anna Kova

==== Lollapalooza Berlin ====
- Location: Olympiastadion and Olympiapark, Berlin, Germany
- Date: 9–10 September 2023

Main Stage North
Saturday	Sunday
Mumford & Sons; Ava Max; Ayliva; Moonchild Sanelly; Meute	Imagine Dragons; SDP; Bilderbuch; Only The Poets; Lina
Main Stage South
Macklemore; Sam Fender; Chase Atlantic; Luvre47; Lune	David Guetta; The Blaze; Zara Larsson; Mimi Webb; Lauren Spencer-Smith; Jesse Jo Stark
Alternative Stage
Aurora; Yendry; High Vis; Moncrieff; Liz; Graf Fidi; Weird Crimes	B.I; Leoniden; Lovejoy; AJR; Talk; Bellah; Eee Gee; Queen B
Perry's Stage
Alligatoah; Alexander Marcus; W&W; Vini Vici; Lilly Palmer; Ski Aggu; Domiziana; KC Lights	Jason Derulo; Lost Frequencies; Kshmr; Öwnboss; Danny Ávila; Pretty Pink
Weingarten Stage
Wa22ermann; Denise Chaila; Julie Pavon; Futurebae; Alina Pash; Teven	Baby B3ns; Pantha; Rua; Parka & Schlönzke; Josi; Marie Bothmer; MARYAM.fyi

==== Lollapalooza India ====
- Location: Mahalaxmi Racecourse, Mumbai, India
- Date: 28–29 January 2023

Budx Stage
Saturday	Sunday
Imagine Dragons; AP Dhillon; Japanese Breakfast; The Yellow Diary; Aswekeepsearching	The Strokes; Prateek Kuhad; The Wombats; The F16s; Bombay Brass
Walkers & Co. Stage
Greta Van Fleet; Chelsea Cutler; Bloodywood; T.ill APES	Jackson Wang; Kayan; Raveena; Music Kay Musafir
Nexa Stage
Madeon; Sandunes; Kumail; Mali; Easy Wanderlings	House of Hashbass; Cigarettes After Sex; Tejas; Tanmaya Bhatnagar; Aadya
Perry's × Budweiser Beats
Zhu; Imanbek; Kasablanca; Madboy/Mink; Tracy De Sà; Abhi Meer	Diplo; Divine; Apashe; Kavya; Siri; Parimal Shais

=== 2024 ===
==== Lollapalooza India ====
- Location: Mahalaxmi Racecourse, Mumbai, India
- Date: 27–28 January 2024

Budweiser Stage
Saturday	Sunday
Jonas Brothers; Lauv; The Raghu Dixit Project	Sting; Keane; Anoushka Shankar; Komorebi
Walkers & Co. Stage
Halsey; Royal Blood; Skrat; Kamakshi Khanna	OneRepublic; Jungle; The Rose; Parvaaz
Nexa Stage
Caribou; Dualist Inquiry; Fatoumata Diawara; Maanuni | Sunep; Jatayu; Long Distances	JPEGMafia; Eric Nam; Parekh & Singh; Heatsink | Brecilla; Shashwat Bulusu; Megan Murray
Perry's Stage
Kenny Beats; The Karan Kanchan Experience; Garden City Movement; chrms; Dewdrops; Sublime Sound	Meduza; Malaa; Prabh Deep; Monophonik; JBabe; Stalvart John

==== Lollapalooza Argentina ====
- Location: Hipódromo de San Isidro, Buenos Aires, Argentina
- Date: 15–17 March 2024

Flow Stage
Friday	Saturday	Sunday
Dua Lipa; The Offspring; Grupo Frontera; Jere Klein; Winona Riders; Daniela Milagros; Paula Prieto	SZA; Phoenix; Jungle; Latin Mafia; Luca Bocci; Un Verano; Joelle	Travis Scott; Thirty Seconds to Mars; Bandalos Chinos; Dayglow; Gale; Abril Olivera; Fin del Mundo
Samsung Stage
Diplo; Arcade Fire; YSY A; Fletcher; Juliana Gattas; Pacifica; Mujer Cebra	Above & Beyond; Sam Smith; Miranda!; Kenia Os; Blair; Santi Muk; Mar Marzo	Meduza; Limp Bizkit; Hozier; Jessie Reyez; El Zar; Fermin; Joven Breakfast
Alternative Stage
The Blaze; Ca7riel & Paco Amoroso; Peces Raros; nsqk; Jaze; El Culto Casero	The Driver Era; Omar Apollo; Nothing but Thieves; Koino Yokan; Lia Kali; Santi Celli; Babeblade	King Gizzard & the Lizard Wizard; Bhavi; Pierce the Veil; León Larregui; Ximena Sariñana; Nenagenix; Mat Alba
Perry's Stage
Dom Dolla; MK; Mariano Mellino; Saiko; BB Trickz; Evlay; Oney1; Fiah Miau; Juana Rozas	Timmy Trumpet; Loud Luxury; Robleis; BM; Franzizca; Chico Blanco (Live); Mechayrxmeo; Ill Quentin; Garoto 3000	Zhu; Dombresky; Overmono; Mesita; FMK; Alejo Isakk; Anita B Queen; Akriila; Trucha; Canals

==== Lollapalooza Chile ====
- Location: Parque Cerrillos, Santiago, Chile
- Date: 15–17 March 2024

Cenco Malls Stage
Friday	Saturday	Sunday
Travis Scott; Thirty Seconds to Mars; Jessie Reyez; Kenia Os; Bratty	Dua Lipa; The Offspring; Fletcher; Glup!; Tronic	SZA; Phoenix; Jere Klein; Denise Rosenthal; Los Mesoneros; Orquesta Fach
Banco de Chile Stage
Meduza; Hozier; Doechii; Dayglow; Gale; Machuca	Diplo; Arcade Fire; Francisca Valenzuela; Monsieur Periné; Verito Asprilla	Chencho Corleone; Sam Smith; Jungle; Grupo Frontera; Nicole; Chystemc
Alternative Stage
King Gizzard & the Lizard Wizard; Él Mató a un Policía Motorizado; Pierce the Veil; León Larregui; Muerdo; Florian	The Blaze; Movimiento Original; Cami; José Madero; Fármacos; BB Trickz	The Driver Era; Omar Apollo; Nothing but Thieves; Ana Tijoux; Gonzalo Yañez; FaceBrooklyn; Estoy Bien
Perry's Stage by Cenco Malls
Bresh; Zhu; Dombresky; Overmono; Akriila; Latin Mafia; Bad Milk; Bhavi; Ceaese	Kidd Voodoo; Dom Dolla; MK; Dalex; Pablito Pesadilla; Rainao; DJ Tee; Aura BAE; Lua Lacruz	Above & Beyond; Timmy Trumpet; Loud Luxury; Easykid; DJ Who; Saiko; Alejo; Nsqk; Taiu; LSV
Lotus Stage
Los Pericos; Diamante Eléctrico; Ximena Sariñana; Tiano Bless; Cigarbox Man; El significado de las flores	Red Bull Batalla; Francisco Victoria; Andres Nusser; Los Miserables; The Alive!; Tenemos Explosivos	Congreso; Saiko; Yami Safdie; Ambar Luna; Laia; Kinmakirú

==== Lollapalooza Brasil ====
- Location: Autódromo de Interlagos, São Paulo, Brazil
- Date: 22–24 March 2024

Budweiser Stage
Friday	Saturday	Sunday
Blink-182; The Offspring; Fletcher; Lourena; Rancore	Jonas Brothers; Thirty Seconds to Mars; Jessie Reyez; BK'; Tulipa Ruiz	SZA; Phoenix; Nothing but Thieves; Hungria; Benziê
Samsung Galaxy
Arcade Fire; Jungle; Luísa Sonza; Dexter 8º Anjo	Titãs; Limp Bizkit; Hozier; Xamã; MC Luanna; Supla	Greta Van Fleet; Sam Smith; Gilberto Gil; Dayglow; Braza; YMA
Alternative Stage
The Blaze; BaianaSystem; Marcelo D2; Maneva; Nouvella	King Gizzard & the Lizard Wizard; Kevin O Chris; Pierce the Veil; Manu Gavassi; Day Limns; Stop Play Moon	The Driver Era; Omar Apollo; Rael; Céu; MC Daniel
Perry's by Johnnie Walker
Diplo; Dom Dolla; MK; Kittin; Classmatic; Mila Journée; Ratier; Mary Mesk; From House to Disco; Ella Whatt	Above & Beyond; Timmy Trumpet; Loud Luxury; Groove Delight; Gabe; Sarah Stenzel B2B Curol; Jessica Brankka; Riascode; Giu; Marina Dias	Meduza; Zhu; Dombresky; J. Worra; Livinho + MC Davi; TZ da Coronel + Oruam; Vulgo FK + Dricka; MC Soffia; DJ Subúrbia

==== Lollapalooza ====
Location: Grant Park in Chicago, United States

Dates: Aug 1–4, 2024

Selected performances were livestreamed on Hulu. Organizers reported a total attendance of about 460,000 over four days, averaging 115,000 attendees per day.

Bud Light

Thursday: Matt Hansen, Sam Barber, Jungle, Lizzy McAlpine, Hozier
Friday: Sundial, Wilderado, Sexyy Red, Laufey, Stray Kids
Saturday: Infinity Song, Dora Jar, TV Girl, Tate McRae, Future x Metro Boomin
Saturday: Knox, Mimi Webb, Vince Staples, Conan Gray, Melanie Martinez

Tito's Handmade Vodka

Thursday: Abby Holliday, Fleshwater, d4vd, The Japanese House, Camden Cox
Friday: The Stews, Geese, Raye, Faye Webster, Brandi Cyrus
Saturday: Dasha, Josiah and the Bonnevilles, BoyWithUke, Cannons, Xandra
Sunday: Kyle Dion, Good Kid, Teezo Touchdown, Teddy Swims, Chicago Made

Bacardí

Thursday: Worry Club, Quannnic, Blondshell, Riovaz, Elyanna, Gioli & Assia, Saint Levant, Flo, Daði Freyr
Friday: Fifteenoeight, Godly the Ruler, Wisp, Blu DeTiger, Malcolm Todd, Lola Young, Ryan Beatty, Megan Moroney, In This Moment
Saturday: Savannah Re, Friko, Happy Landing, Quarters of Change, Tanner Usrey, Eyedress, Romy, Killer Mike, Yoasobi
Sunday: Scarlet DeMore, Post Sex Nachos, Nico Vega, Briscoe, Medium Build, The Last Dinner Party, Grentperez, Cults, Ben Böhmer

BMI

Thursday: Chance Emerson, Goldie Boutilier, Brenn!, Wolves of Glendale, Walter the Producer, Adan Diaz
Friday: Cale Tyson, Taylor Acorn, Ava Maybee, Tiny Habits, The National Parks, Mckenna Grace
Saturday: Hayes Warner, Nightly, Natalie Jane, Will Linley, Tommy Newport, Sam Nelson Harris
Sunday: Ryan Trey, Huddy, Kaitlin Butts, Carmen DeLeon, Treaty Oak Revival, Willis

Kidzapalooza

Thursday: 123 Andrés, School of Rock Allstars, Taj Farrant, Pierce Freelon
Friday: Taj Farrant, 123 Andrés, Pierce Freelon, School of Rock Allstars
Saturday: Uncle Jumbo, Joanie Leeds, Homeschool, The Happiness Club, Q Brothers
Sunday: Homeschool, Uncle Jumbo, Q Brothers, Bianca Shaw, Joanie Leeds

Perry's/Sonny's

Thursday: Camden Cox, Brandi Cyrus, Spinall, Kasbo, Walker & Royce, Farley "Jackmaster" Funk, Don Diablo, Mochakk, Fisher
Friday: Gudfella, Xandra, Twinsick, It's Murph, Noizu, Alok, Loud Luxury, Galantis, Zedd
Saturday: Ahadadream B2B Manara, 2hollis, Dylan Brady, Kenny Beats, Nia Archives, Four Tet, Skrillex
Sunday: Eddie, Nostalgix, Jessica Audiffred, Hol!, Mersiv, Whyte Fang, Black Tiger Sex Machine, Zeds Dead

IHG

Thursday: Been Stellar, BigXthaPlug, Olivia Dean, Kesha, Benson Boone
Friday: Daniel Seavey, Militarie Gun, Veeze, Ruel, Kevin Abstract
Saturday: Brigitte Calls Me Baby, Destroy Boys, Briston Maroney, Ethel Cain, Hippo Campus
Sunday: Valencia Grace, Yot Club, Waterparks, Sir, Two Door Cinema Club

T-Mobile

Thursday: METTE, Tyla, Chappell Roan, Labrinth, Megan Thee Stallion
Friday: PawPaw Rod, Qveen Herby, Victoria Monét, Reneé Rapp, SZA
Saturday: Armani White, Leisure, Ive, Deftones, Green Day
Sunday: Hanabie, Slow Pulp, Pierce the Veil, Dominic Fike, Blink-182

==== Lollapalooza Berlin ====
- Location: Olympiastadion and Olympiapark, Berlin, Germany
- Date: 7–8 September 2024

Main Stage North
Saturday	Sunday
Dua Lipa; Louis Tomlinson; Jeremias; Natalie Jane; Henry Moodie; Nils Wanderer	Tate McRae; Niall Horan; Loyle Carner; Mine; Cmat
Main Stage South
Burna Boy; Shirin David; Von Wegen Lisbeth; Tom Grennan; The Beaches; Ellice	Seventeen; Cro; Nothing but Thieves; Kenya Grace; Deine Freunde
Alternative Stage
Sam Topkins; Lola Young; Matt Maltese; Lena & Linus; Raum27; Josi	Christopher; Glass Beams; Thee Sacred Souls; Levin Liam; Cloudy June
Perry's Stage
Martin Garrix; Alok; Joel Corry; Apashe; Cassö; Jaxomy	The Chainsmokers; Meduza; Elderbrook; Girls Don't Sync; Bjones

=== 2025 ===
==== Lollapalooza ====
Lollapalooza Chicago 2025

Location: Grant Park in Chicago, United States

Dates: Jul 31 – Aug 3, 2025

Thursday:
- Tyler, the Creator
- Luke Combs
- Gracie Abrams
- Dom Dolla
- Cage the Elephant
- Sierra Ferrell
- Role Model
- Mau P
- Royel Otis
- Barry Can't Swim
- Magdalena Bay
- 2hollis
- Cloonee
- Alex Warren
- Overmono
- Xdinary Heroes
- The Blessed Madonna
- Half-Alive
- Mark Ambor
- Fcukers
- Matt Champion
- Glass Beams
- Prospa
- Julie
- Durand Bernarr
- Azzecca
- Ratboys
- Nourished by Time
- Sunami
- Black Party
- The Droptines
- Silly Goose
- The Symposium
- Torren Foot b2b Airwolf Paradise
- Jade LeMac
- DJ Heather
- Yana
- Xaviersobased
- Colby Acuff
- Bo Staloch
- Alexsucks
- Chicago Made
- Girl Tones
Friday:
- Olivia Rodrigo
- Korn
- Djo
- Bleachers
- Wallows
- T-Pain
- Knock2
- Foster the People
- Bladee
- Flipturn
- ISOxo
- Tape B
- Amaarae
- The Dare
- Gigi Perez
- Ravyn Lenae
- Wyatt Flores
- Bunt.
- Ocean Alley
- Del Water Gap
- Otoboke Beaver
- Kenny Mason
- Murda Beatz
- Orla Gartland
- Hey, Nothing
- Alleycvt
- Isabel LaRosa
- Jane Remover
- Alemeda
- Zinadelphia
- Tanner Adell
- Dogpark
- Old Mervs
- Jesse Detor
- Viperactive
- Mary Droppinz
- Hex Cougar
- Carol Ades
- Caroline Kingsbury
- Star Bandz
- Midnight Generation
- Cassandra Coleman
- Winyah
Saturday:
- Rüfüs Du Sol
- TWICE
- Doechii
- Clairo
- Young Miko
- Mk.gee
- Two Friends
- Marina
- Chase & Status
- Levity
- JPEGMafia
- Fujii Kaze
- Dr. Fresch
- Bilmuri
- Damiano David
- Orion Sun
- Ole 60
- BossMan Dlow
- Max McNown
- Flux Pavilion
- Montell Fish
- Wasia Project
- LAYZ
- Ca7riel & Paco Amoroso
- Salute
- Charlotte Lawrence
- KickFlip
- Naomi Scott
- Sam Austins
- Chicago Youth Symphony Orchestra
- NewDad
- Bôa
- Dua Saleh
- Daniel Allan
- Winnetka Bowling League
- Junior Varsity
- Carter Vail
- Rachel Grae
- People R Ugly
- Landon Conrath
- jev.
- Tessla
- Eddie and The Getaway
- Zoe Ko
Sunday:
- Sabrina Carpenter
- A$AP Rocky
- Martin Garrix
- The Marías
- Dominic Fike
- Still Woozy
- Finneas
- Remi Wolf
- Latin Mafia
- Gryffin
- Sammy Virji
- Isaiah Rashad
- Mariah the Scientist
- Ian
- Wave to Earth
- Marlon Hoffstadt
- Artemas
- Joey Valence & Brae
- Katseye
- Maribou State
- La Femme
- Wild Rivers
- Rebecca Black
- Wunderhorse
- Laila!
- BoyNextDoor
- Flowerovlove
- Willow Avalon
- Vincent Lima
- Joe P
- Nimino
- jigitz
- The Criticals
- Landon Barker
- Blk Odyssy
- Benches
- Lekan
- Sofia Camara
- Aliyah's Interlude
- Graham Barham
- Kaicrewsade
- RaeCola
Source
Lollapalooza India 2025

Location: Mahalaxmi Racecourse, Mumbai, India

Dates: 8 Mar - 9 Mar, 2025

Saturday:
- Shawn Mendes
- Glass Animals
- Zedd
- Big Boi
- Cory Wong
- Talwiinder
- Dot.
- Isabel LaRosa
- Dhanji
- Spryk
- Sahil Vasudeva
- Anushka
- Lullanas
- Sid Vashi
Sunday:
- Green Day
- Louis Tomlinson
- John Summit
- Nothing but Thieves
- Aurora
- Hanumankind
- Alok
- Wave to Earth
- Raftaar
- KRSNA
- Niladri Kumar
- Lisa Mishra
- Raman Negi
- Raghav Meattle
- Sudan Archives

=== 2026 ===
==== Lollapalooza ====
Lollapalooza Chicago 2026

Location: Grant Park in Chicago, United States

Dates: Jul 30 – Aug 2, 2026

Thursday:
- Lorde
- John Summit
- Sombr
- Empire of the Sun
- Wet Leg
- Worship
- Blood Orange
- 5 Seconds of Summer
- Kettama
- Viagra Boys
- Audrey Hobert
- Snow Strippers
- Boris Brejcha
- Paris Paloma
- Little Simz
- CMAT
- Boys Noize
- Between Friends
- MPH
- Amble
- Kingfishr
- Ninajirachi
- Haute and Freddy
- Bella Kay
- Marlon Funaki
- Devault
- SB19
- Ecca Vandal
- Bad Nerves
- Asha Banks
- Faouzia
- Evening Elephants
- Pearly Drops
- Bixby
- Penelope Road
- Know Good
- Elizabeth Nichols
- Klo
- The Braymores
- Chalk
- Simon Grossmann
- Kim Theory

Friday:
- Charli xcx
- The Smashing Pumpkins
- Lil Uzi Vert
- Yungblud
- Major Lazer
- Not for Radio
- Zara Larsson
- Freddie Gibbs
- Suki Waterhouse
- I-dle
- Mustard
- Oklou
- HorsegiirL
- The Story So Far
- Loathe
- Nettspend
- Sidepiece
- Skye Newman
- Notion
- RØZ
- Balu Brigada
- LYNY
- Mother Mother
- Julia Wolf
- Slayyyter
- Claire Rosinkranz
- 54 Ultra
- High Vis
- Finn Wolfhard
- Avello
- PartyOf2
- The Army, The Navy
- Love Spells
- Ella Red
- Paloma Morphy
- Day We Ran
- Ivri
- Ella Boh
- Bradeazy
- Emi Grace
- Beno
- Chicago Made
- Valencia Grace
- Whitney Whitney

Saturday:
- Olivia Dean
- Jennie
- The Neighbourhood
- Ethel Cain
- Disco Lines
- Leon Thomas
- Clipse
- Geese
- Alison Wonderland
- DJ Trixie Mattel
- Bbno$
- Kwn
- Sienna Spiro
- Max Styler
- Spacey Jane
- Wolf Alice
- Whethan
- Cortis
- Cameron Whitcomb
- Ayybo
- Khamari
- Quadeca
- Momma
- Frost Children
- Goldie Boutilier
- Die Spitz
- Lucy Bedroque
- Omnom
- Jim Legxacy
- Chezile
- Jae Stephens
- Ryman
- Villanelle
- Sunday (1994)
- MC4D
- Chace
- Calder Allen
- Nat Myers
- Ink
- Peace Control
- The Creekers
- Next of Kin
- Chicago Youth Symphony Orchestras

Sunday:
- Tate McRae
- The xx
- Turnstile
- Beabadoobee
- Aespa
- The Chainsmokers
- Muna
- Hot Mulligan
- Yoasobi
- Ado
- Jade
- Eli Brown
- Duke Dumont
- Fakemink
- Dombresky
- Monaleo
- Adéla
- Riordan
- Wunderhorse
- Amber Mark
- Westend
- Destin Conrad
- Inji
- Waylon Wyatt
- Water from Your Eyes
- Los Retros
- Vandelux
- New Constellations
- Cruz Beckham and the Breakers
- The Bends
- After
- Whatmore
- Porch Light
- Easy Honey
- Jackie Hollander
- Stella Lefty
- Justine Skye
- Will Swinton
- Sunshine
- Case Oats
- Surfing for Daisy
- Snacktime
- Zack Martino
Source
Lollapalooza India 2026

Location: Mahalaxmi Racecourse in Mumbai, India

Dates: Jan 24 - Jan 25, 2026

Saturday:
- Playboi Carti
- Yungblud
- Knock2
- Fujii Kaze
- Mother Mother
- Ken Carson
- Destroy Lonely
- HXG
- The Midnight
- Hamdi
- Hot Milk
- Ankur Tewari
- MU540
- Zoya
- Gauley Bhai
- NATE08
- Pho
- Still in Therapy
- Rounak Malti
- Sijya
- Sunflower Tape Machine

Sunday:
- Linkin Park
- Kehlani
- Lany
- Sammy Virji
- Bloodywood
- Calum Scott
- Nubiyan Twist
- Baalti
- Bunt.
- Karsh Kale
- Oaff
- Savera
- Mxrci
- Sen
- Gini
- Pacifist
- Zokova
- Excise Department
- Rudy Mukta
- Trance Effect
