= Terraplana =

Brazilian shoegaze band

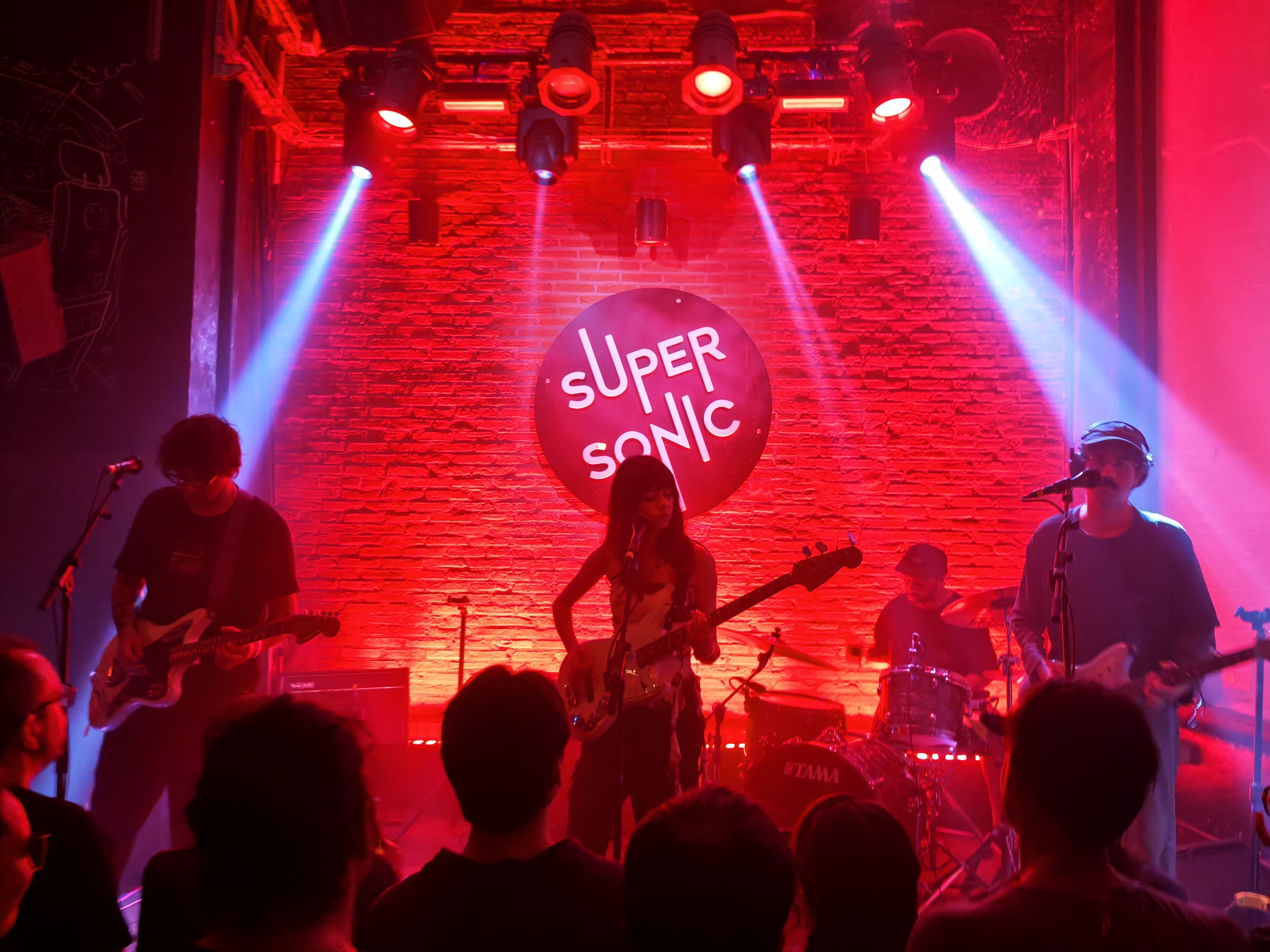
- Terraplana at their Paris show in 2026

Background information
- Origin: Curitiba, Paraná, Brazil
- Genres: Shoegaze; post-rock; alternative rock; indie rock; post-hardcore; slowcore
- Years active: 2017–present
- Label: Balaclava
- Members: Stephani Heuczuk; Vinícius Lourenço; Cassiano Kruchelski; Wendeu Silverio
- Past members: Matheus Teles
- Website: trrpln.com

Terraplana (Brazilian Portuguese pronunciation: [ˌtɛ.ʁɐˈplɐ᷉.nɐ]; Portuguese for 'Flatearth'; stylized in lowercase) is a Brazilian shoegaze band formed in 2017 in Curitiba, Paraná. It consists of Stephani Heuczuk (bass, vocals), Vinícius Lourenço (guitars, vocals), Cassiano Kruchelski (guitars, vocals), and Wendeu Silverio (drums). Their music blends shoegaze, post-rock, and alternative rock, incorporating ambient textures, ethereal vocals, and distorted guitar work. Singing primarily in Portuguese, the band emphasizes introspective lyrical themes and layered sonic compositions. They have been recognized as one of the leading acts in Brazil's underground shoegaze revival scene.

Terraplana released their debut EP Exílio in 2017, followed by their first full-length album Olhar Pra Trás in 2023, which received critical acclaim and marked their rise in national visibility. In 2025, the band released their second album Natural, which expanded their sonic palette and was praised by critics from outlets such as Monkeybuzz, Folha de S.Paulo, and Stereogum. They have performed at major events including South by Southwest (SXSW), Primavera Sound São Paulo, and Coolritiba Festival, and have toured internationally in Argentina and the United States.

== History ==
=== 2017–2018: Formation and Exílio ===
Stephani Heuczuk and Vinícius Lourenço connected through online interactions on Twitter in 2011 and began exchanging musical ideas. Lourenço moved to Curitiba in 2015; the band emerged in 2017 in that city. Although early projects did not come to fruition, the collaboration progressed to songwriting during this period, and by May, the band had solidified into a quartet, originally consisting of Heuczuk (bass, vocals), Lourenço (guitars, vocals), Matheus Teles (guitars, vocals), and Wendeu Silverio (drums). In an interview with Luciano Ferreiro, Lourenço and Silverio said they chose the name terraplana (lit. 'flatearth') because it was easy to remember. Their first concert was at an event organized by the band itself, playing alongside their friends' bands Rawph and Céu de Vênus.

The group then released their debut extended play, titled Exílio, on 21 December 2017. It features six tracks—"Intro", "Ambedo", "Lamento", "Interlúdio", "Virou Crime", and "Fall"—and runs for a total of 19 minutes. Entirely self-produced by Lourenço in his bedroom studio who stated that "it was quite a long process", starting with recording in September, and by December undergoing mixing and mastering. The group reached out to several music websites, including from Latin America, and radio stations to help promote the work, and began selling band T-shirts at shows. Exílio received positive reviews and was well received by audiences, which led the band to play numerous shows in 2018, touring through Paraná, São Paulo, and Santa Catarina.

=== 2019–2024: Touring, Olhar Pra Trás and early success ===
In 2019, they performed alongside Brazilian indie bands including Terno Rei, Adorável Clichê, and Eliminadorzinho. With the outbreak of the COVID-19 pandemic in 2020, the group postponed the release of their debut album Olhar Pra Trás, which had been planned for that year. However, according to Lourenço, they "never stopped completely: when they couldn't rehearse, they wrote music remotely and came up with other ways to keep the band alive, like producing shirts and general merch". That same year, Matheus Teles left the band and was replaced by Cassiano Kruchelski (guitars, vocals). The group participated in Rock Triste Contra o Coronavírus, a benefit compilation released in 2020 that united 44 Brazilian artists to raise donations for over 15,000 homeless and vulnerable families during the COVID-19 pandemic. Terraplana contributed a shoegaze-style cover of Pitty's "Na Sua Estante", with proceeds going to the Movimento de Luta nos Bairros, Vilas e Favelas (MLB).

In 2022, Terraplana began recording Olhar Pra Trás at Nico's Studio. Around the same time, the band participated in and won a contest organized by the music company Groover, which granted them a spot at a special edition of Balaclava Fest featuring artists from the Balaclava Records roster, such as Gorduratrans, E A Terra Nunca Me Pareceu Tão Distante, and Lupe de Lupe. Kruchelski said that "Balaclava Fest happened at the perfect time, right when we were producing the album. We took the opportunity to play the songs with their final arrangements, and the reception got us even more excited. The contest and the festival opened doors for us and brought in a new audience that definitely connects with our sound but didn't know us yet". This opportunity connected the band with the team at Balaclava Records, with whom Terraplana signed a contract. At the end of 2022, they completed the album. The singles "Conversas" and "Memórias" were released in January and February 2023, respectively.

On 1 March, the debut studio album Olhar Pra Trás was released via streaming platforms, produced by Gustavo Schimer, and mixed and mastered by Nico Braganholo, who have worked with bands like Terno Rei and Jovem Dionisio and includes material written primarily before 2020. The album peaked at number 85 on the Apple Music Brazil chart and received generally positive reviews from music websites such as Scream & Yell, Monkeybuzz, and Teoria Cultural. The group later toured in support of the album, performing with acts such as Eliminadorzinho, Sonhos Tomam Conta, and Gorduratrans. Their profile rose significantly after opening for international acts such as Deafheaven in 12 March and Slowdive on 30 November 2023, as part of the Primavera Sound São Paulo festival's "Primavera na Cidade" program. Slowdive's Neil Halstead was photographed wearing a Terraplana T-shirt, which further drew attention to the band. The album was selected by the São Paulo Art Critics Association as one of the 50 best Brazilian albums of 2023. In July 2023, they released Ao Vivo na Vinícola, a live EP comprising five tracks from olhar pra trás, showcasing more visceral interpretations of the album's material.

=== 2025–present: Natural and international acclaim ===
On 11 March 2025, the band released their second studio album Natural by Balaclava Records, with global distribution via Flesh and Bone Records. It was produced and mixed by American musician JooJoo Ashworth, who was introduced to the band by fellow Brazilian-American artist Samira Winter. The album was recorded over two weeks in August 2024 at Nico's Studio in Curitiba. The lead single, "Charlie", was accompanied by a music video filmed in an amusement park in Curitiba.

The album was described as a record that pushed beyond conventional shoegaze boundaries by Lucas Cassoli of Monkeybuzz. The album was reviewed positively by him and reviewers from Música Instantânea, Folha de S.Paulo, and the English-language outlet Stereogum, which named it "Album of the Week" during its release week. They performed at South by Southwest (SXSW) in Austin, Texas, in March 2025 and toured Argentina, with stops in Rosario and Buenos Aires. Terraplana also performed at the Coolritiba Festival on 17 May 2025. Terraplana performed at Lollapalooza Brazil 2026 at the Interlagos Circuit in São Paulo, appearing on March 20 at the Samsung Galaxy stage. The edition featured 71 acts, both national and international, with headliners including Sabrina Carpenter, Tyler, the Creator, Lorde, Chappell Roan, Deftones, and Skrillex.

== Artistry ==
Terraplana has been categorized as shoegaze, post-rock, alternative rock, indie rock, post-hardcore, and slowcore, incorporating layered textures, ambient elements, and a balance between delicate vocal harmonies and distorted guitars. Terraplana has been recognized as part of a wave of shoegaze bands contributing to the genre's revival within Brazil's underground music scene. Terraplana has also been associated with the rock triste scene, a movement within Brazilian independent music.

Exílio is rooted in shoegaze and post-rock and blends ambient textures with distorted guitars and ethereal vocals, which are treated as an additional instrumental layer rather than a narrative focal point. Thematically, the EP explores solitude and introspection, with the title referring to an internal form of exile that can only be resolved individually. The band's first full-length album, Olhar Pra Trás (2023), maintained this stylistic approach while refining its production and thematic cohesion. It features soft vocals juxtaposed with heavy, noisy instrumentation, continuing their exploration of shoegaze and post-rock aesthetics. With their second album, Natural (2025), Terraplana expanded their stylistic range, embracing a lighter, more open sound that moved beyond conventional shoegaze boundaries. The album blends lo-fi textures with polished clarity and incorporates elements from 1990s and 2000s subgenres, including indie rock, grunge, and harmonic structures reminiscent of Deftones.

The band cites a broad range of influences. While acknowledging the foundational impact of shoegaze pioneers such as Slowdive and My Bloody Valentine, Terraplana also draws inspiration from artists across genres, including Unwound, Slint, Duster, Pinback, Bark Psychosis, Steve Reich, and Milton Nascimento. Brazilian acts such as Gorduratrans, Máquinas, and Boogarins are also noted as significant references, particularly for their sonic approach and career trajectories. Members have cited cinema as an influence, referencing films such as Melancholia, Mr. Nobody, and Drive as inspirational to their creative process. Their approach to songwriting is organic; songs often emerge simultaneously in a manner reflective of the band's emotional state.

The band predominantly performs in Portuguese. Members have expressed that singing in their native language allows for greater emotional and poetic expression, which they view as central to their artistic identity. Heuczuk has noted that Portuguese, while more challenging in terms of songwriting, lends itself to a poetic sensibility that suits the band's themes. Nevertheless, they remain open to using English when appropriate, as demonstrated by their bilingual track "Hear A Whisper" featuring Winter and earlier English-language songs on Exílio.

== Members ==
Current members

- Stephani Heuczuk – bass, vocals (2017–present)
- Vinícius Lourenço – guitar, vocals (2017–present)
- Cassiano Kruchelski – guitar, vocals (2019–present)
- Wendeu Silverio – drums (2017–present)

Former members

- Matheus Teles – guitar, vocals (2017–2019)

== Discography ==
=== Studio albums ===
- Olhar Pra Trás (2023)
- Natural (2025)

=== EPs ===
- Exílio (2017)
- Ao Vivo na Vinícola (2023)
