= E A Terra Nunca Me Pareceu Tão Distante =

Brazilian post-rock band

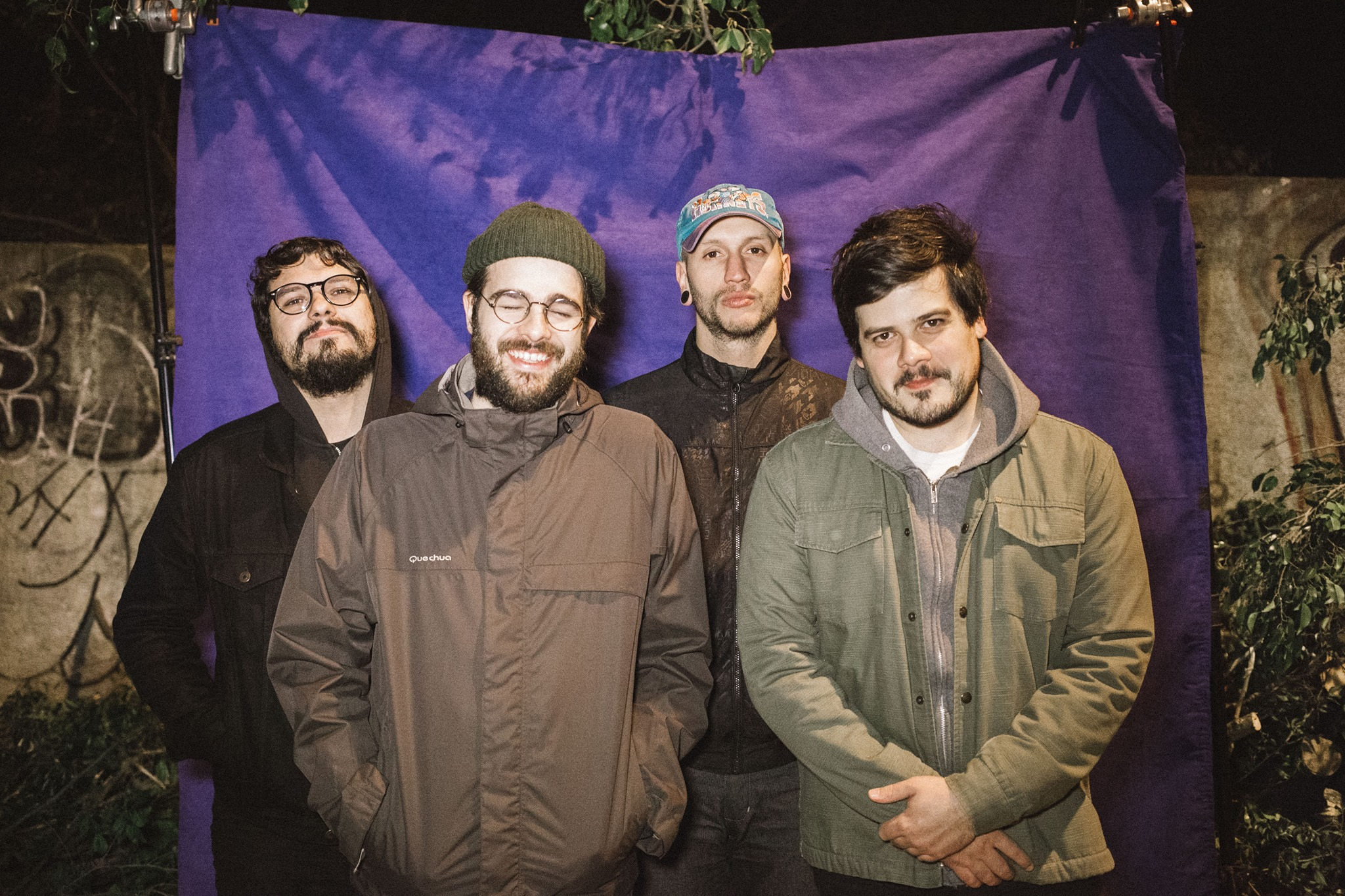

Background information
- Origin: São Paulo, Brazil
- Genres: Post-rock; instrumental rock; experimental rock
- Years active: 2013–present
- Label: Balaclava
- Members: Lucas Theodoro; Luden Viana; Luccas Villela; Rafael Jonke
- Past members: Marcelo Rachmuth

E A Terra Nunca Me Pareceu Tão Distante (Brazilian Portuguese pronunciation: [i a ˈtɛ.ʁɐ ˈnũ.kɐ mi pa.ɾeˈsew ˈtɐ̃w̃ d͡ʒisˈtɐ̃.t͡ʃi]; Portuguese for 'And the Earth Never Seemed So Far Away to Me') is a Brazilian post-rock band formed in São Paulo in 2013. It consists of Lucas Theodoro (guitars, synthesizers), Luden Viana (guitars, synthesizers), Luccas Villela (bass, guitars), and Rafael Jonke (drums). Their music blends post-rock, instrumental rock, and experimental rock, incorporating atmospheric, ambient textures and emotional lyricism.

The band released their self-titled debut extended play (EP) in 2013, followed by a second EP, Vazio (lit. 'Empty') in 2014, which was funded through crowdfunding. Their debut studio album, Fundação (lit. 'Foundation'), released in 2018 via Balaclava Records, marked a stylistic evolution with the incorporation of math rock elements and their first use of vocals. The album was positively received and led to a national tour, including appearances at major festivals like Lollapalooza Brazil, where they became the first instrumental act to perform. After a period of relative inactivity as of 2019 during the COVID-19 pandemic, the group returned in 2023 with the self-produced EP Linguagem (lit. 'Language'), which commemorated their ten-year anniversary.

== History ==
=== 2013–2017: Formation and early years ===
E A Terra Nunca Me Pareceu Tão Distante was formed in 2013 in the city of São Paulo by Rafael Jonke and Luden Viana, longtime collaborators who had previously played together in other projects. They were later joined by Lucas Theodoro and bassist Marcelo Rachmuth. Their first release, a self-titled debut extended play (EP) issued in November 2013, was followed by the single "HIP 13044b" in the same year. A second EP, Vazio (lit. 'Empty'), was released in 2014 and funded through crowdfunding and marked a transition toward more collaborative and melancholic songwriting.

The band's lineup stabilized with the entry of bassist Luccas Villela in early 2015, replacing Rachmuth. Villela contributed to both live performances and new compositions, beginning with the compact Medo de Morrer / Medo de Tentar (lit. 'Fear of Dying / Fear of Trying'), released in 2016 on 7" vinyl by Polysom. The band acknowledged that this EP represented a "touch" of new experimentation, specifically featuring their first use of preliminary electronic elements.

=== 2018–2019: Fundação ===
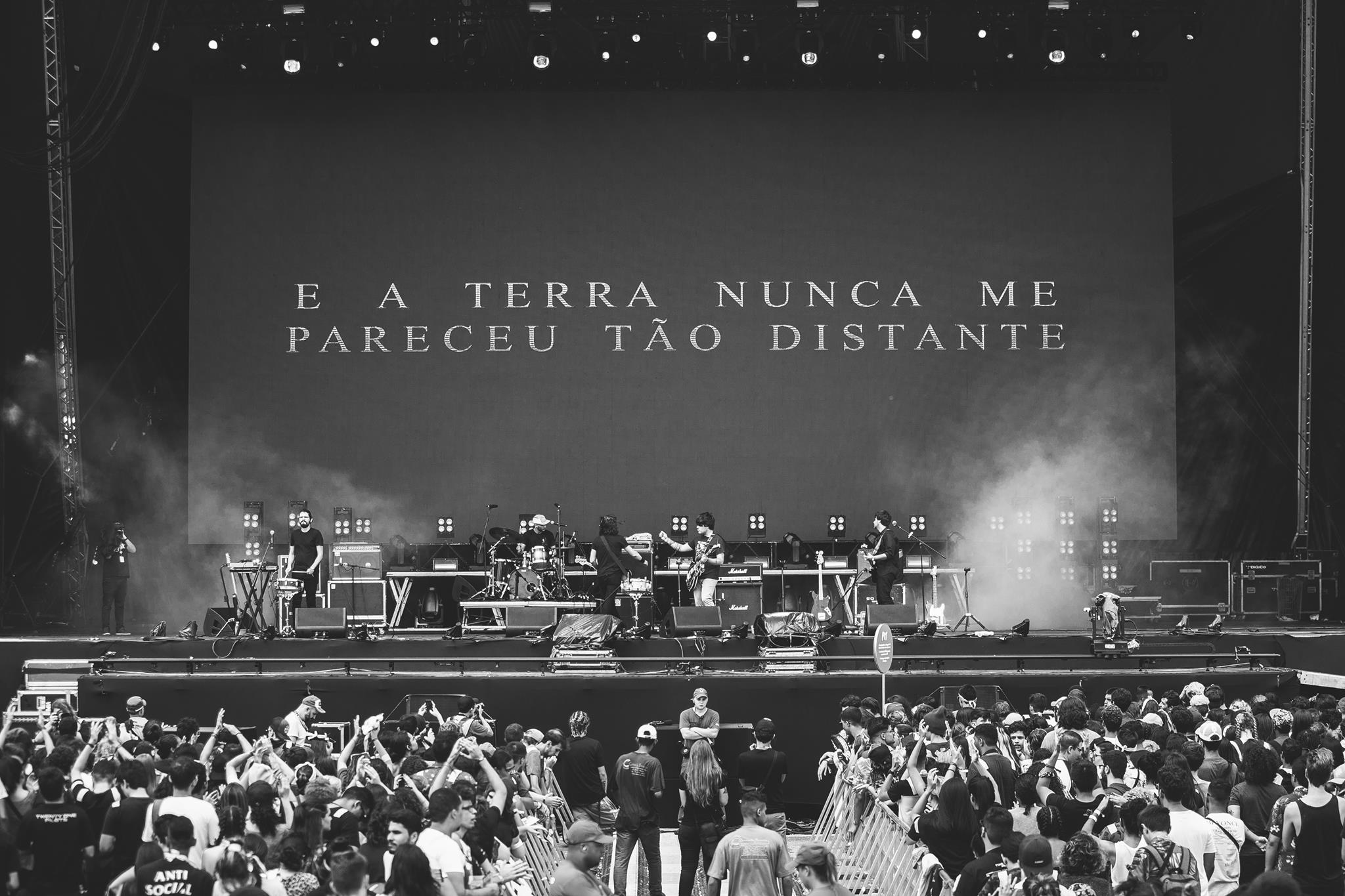
E A Terra Nunca Me Pareceu Tão Distante performing at Lollapalooza Brazil in 2019.

E A Terra Nunca Me Pareceu Tão Distante released their debut studio album Fundação (lit. 'Foundation') on 14 September 2018, through Balaclava Records. The lead single of Fundação, "Daiane" (lit. 'Diane'), was released on 25 May, followed by "Como Aquilo Que Não Se Repete" (lit. 'Like That Which Does Not Repeat Itself') on 22 August. The album was produced by Gabriel Arbex and primarily recorded at Theodoro's home studio in the district of Lapa, São Paulo. The album received generally positive reviews from publications such as Monkeybuzz, Música Instantânea, Tenho Mais Discos Que Amigos!, and Terra, being featured in two end-of-year lists; it ranked 20th among Música Instantânea's list of "The 50 Best Brazilian Albums of 2018" and 15th in Rolling Stone Brasil's corresponding selection.

The band supported Fundação with an extensive touring schedule throughout Brazil, performing in cities such as São Paulo, Rio de Janeiro, Belo Horizonte, Goiânia, Brasília, Uberlândia, Curitiba, Piracicaba, and Campinas. They appeared at prominent festivals including Festival Dia da Música, Virada Cultural in São Paulo, and Festival Bananada. In 2019, they performed at Lollapalooza Brazil, becoming the first instrumental act to appear at the festival. That same year, they played at LeRock Fest in Chile, their first international appearance. The band also opened for international bands such as Slowdive (2018).

=== 2020–present: Hiatus and return ===
Following their active touring period in 2019, the band entered a five-year hiatus from releasing new material due to the COVID-19 pandemic. During the two years they were inactive due to the pandemic, members focused on mental health and personal well-being, while gradually developing new compositions without external deadlines. In 2022, the band performed at a special edition of Balaclava Fest featuring artists from the Balaclava Records roster, including Terraplana, Gorduratrans, and Terno Rei.

The group resumed activity in 2023 with the EP Linguagem (lit. 'Language'), commemorating ten years since their first release. The EP was self-produced by the band and recorded at Costella Studios in São Paulo and Sítio Romã Studios in the interior of the state of São Paulo. It included contributions from producers Gabriel Arbex and Rafael Carvalho, with mixing by Arbex and mastering by Fernando Sanches. A release show was held on 12 November 2023 at Casa Rockambole in São Paulo.

== Artistry ==
E A Terra Nunca Me Pareceu Tão Distante is primarily associated with post-rock, with its music drawing from instrumental rock and related experimental rock genres. The group's initial musical direction was influenced by late 1990s post-rock acts such as Explosions in the Sky, Godspeed You! Black Emperor, and Mogwai, as well as Brazilian groups like Macaco Bong and Hurtmold. Comparisons have also been made to Deafheaven and the film music of Angelo Badalamenti. Members have also acknowledged an interest in a wide range of genres beyond rock, including jazz, punk rock, electronic music, progressive music, and hip-hop artists such as Kendrick Lamar and performers from the São Paulo rap scene. With a background in the hardcore scene, the band adopted a do-it-yourself (DIY) approach, handling their own production, distribution, and show organization.

The group's work is characterized by atmospheric textures, ambient elements, and an emphasis on emotional resonance, often conveyed without the use of vocals. Song titles frequently suggest narrative or conceptual ideas, such as "Essa Deveria Ter Seu Nome Mas Hoje Você Não Está Aqui" ('This One Should Have Your Name But Today You're Not Here') and "Pequenas Expectativas, Menores Decepções" ('Small Expectations, Smaller Disappointments'), both from their debut EP. The EP Vázio, literally meaning "empty", reflected its conceptual foundation of building music from a blank slate. Viana notes that the band's music is often created "to destroy something within me and create another thing from that", aiming for catharsis.

The band's debut album Fundação signaled a shift towards a more energetic and urgent sound. It is a post-rock record with influences from math rock and elements of black metal. It included additional guitar layers, expanded percussion, electronic textures, and, for the first time, vocals on the track "Se A Resposta Gera Dúvida, Então Não É A Solução".

== Members ==
Current members

- Lucas Theodoro – guitars, synthesizers (2013–present)
- Luden Viana – guitars, synthesizers (2013–present)
- Luccas Villela – bass, guitars (2015–present)
- Rafael Jonke – drums (2013–present) (Note: Membership dates are sourced from: Instrumentation is sourced from:)

Former members

- Marcelo Rachmuth – bass (2013–2015)

== Discography ==
=== Studio albums ===
- Fundação (2018)

=== EPs ===
- E A Terra Nunca Me Pareceu Tão Distante (2013)
- Vazio (2014)
- Medo de Morrer / Medo de Tentar (2016)
- Linguagem (2023)
