= Multishow Brazilian Music Award for Hip Hop of the Year =

Brazilian music industry award

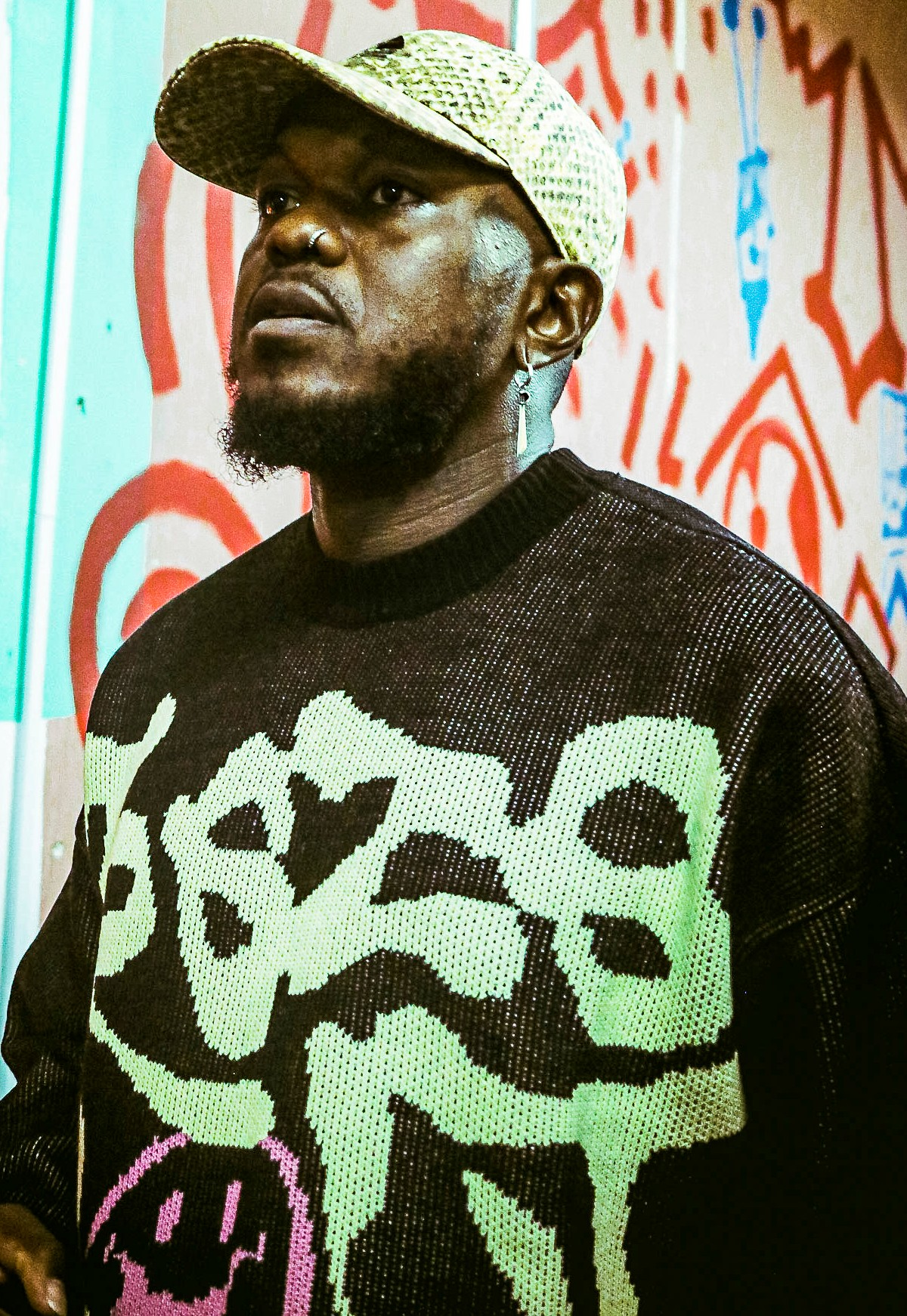
- "Penumbra" by Djonga alongside Sarah Guedes and Rapaz do Dread is the first and only recipient (2023)
- Awarded for: Hip hop songs
- Country: Brazil
- Presented by: Multishow
- First award: 2023
- Final award: 2023

Highlights
- Most nominations: Veigh (2)
- Website: Official website

The Multishow Brazilian Music Award for Hip Hop of the Year was an award presented at the 2023 Multishow Brazilian Music Awards, to artists for hip hop songs. The award was first presented to Djonga, Sarah Guedes and Rapaz do Dread for the song "Penumbra". Veigh holds the record for most nominations, with two. The award was discontinued in 2024.

== History ==
For the 2023 ceremony, the Multishow Awards Academy announced several changes and introduction of new categories. The Academy has expanded to more than 900 members, composed by members of the music industry, with diversity in gender, race, color, musical genres, and region. Additionally, new categories were introduced to recognize artists and musical genres. One of these categories is Hip Hop of the Year, to recognize hip hop genre. The award was presented only in 2023, won by Djonga, Sarah Guedes and Rapaz do Dread for the song "Penumbra". In 2024, the award was discontinued.

== Recipients ==
=== 2020s ===
Recipients
Year	Winner(s)	Nominees	Ref.
2023	Djonga, Sarah Guedes and Rapaz do Dread – "Penumbra"	Vulgo FK, MC PH, Veigh and Pedro Lotto – "Ballena"; Matuê and Rich the Kid – "Conexões de Máfia"; Wiu – "Coração de Gelo"; Kayblack, Baco Exu do Blues and Marquinho no Beat – "Melhor Só"; Veigh, Bvga Beatz and Prod Malax – "Novo Balanço"	

== Artists with multiple nominations ==
2 nominations

- Veigh

== See also ==
- Multishow Brazilian Music Award for Urban Song of the Year
