= Máquina do Tempo =

Studio album by Matuê
- Released: 10 September 2020
- Recorded: 2018–20
- Genre: Hip-hop; trap; psychedelia; pop; synthwave
- Length: 19:32
- Language: Portuguese
- Label: Sony Music; 30praum
- Producer: Matuê; WIU; Pedro Lotto; Celo

Matuê chronology
Máquina do Tempo (2020)	Sabor Overdose no Yakisoba (2024)

Máquina do Tempo (lit. 'Time Machine') is the debut studio album by Brazilian rapper Matuê. It was released on 10 September 2020 on the independent record label 30praum, then distributed by Sony Music. The album set a record for the highest debut on Spotify Brazil, appearing among the most listened to songs on the streaming platform in the country. It earned a triple platinum certification from Pro-Música Brasil.

== Track listing ==
Máquina do Tempo – Standard edition
No.	Title	Writer(s)	Producer(s)	Length
1.	"Cogulândia"	Matuê, Pedro Lotto	Pedro Lotto	2:50
2.	"Antes"	Matuê	WIU	2:49
3.	"Gorila Roxo"	Matuê	WIU	2:45
4.	"Vem Chapar"	Matuê	Matuê, WIU	2:45
5.	"777-666"	Matuê	Matuê, WIU	2:44
6.	"É Sal"	Matuê	Matuê, WIU	2:37
7.	"Máquina do Tempo"	Matuê	WIU, Celo	3:19
Total length:				19:32

== Charts ==
Weekly chart performance for Máquina do Tempo
Chart (2020)	Peak position
Portuguese Albums (AFP)	14

== Certifications ==
Certifications for Máquina do Tempo
Region	Certification	Certified units/sales
Brazil (Pro-Música Brasil)	3× Platinum	120,000^{‡}
^{‡} Sales+streaming figures based on certification alone.
