= 333 (Matuê album) =

Studio album by Matuê
- Released: 9 September 2024
- Recorded: 2021–2024
- Genres: Hip-hop; trap; synth-pop; neo-psychedelia; alternative R&B
- Length: 42:32
- Languages: Portuguese; English (track 12)
- Label: 30praum
- Producers: Matuê, Brandão85, Samuel Batista

Matuê chronology
Sabor Overdose no Yakisoba (2024)	333 (2024)	Xtranho (2025)

Singles from 333
- 1. "Crack com Mussilon" Released: 11 September 2024; 2. "O Som" Released: 18 September 2024; 3. "333" Released: 7 December 2024; 4. "Isso é Sério" Released: 23 January 2025

333 (also titled 333 - Salve Todos) is the second studio album by Brazilian rapper Matuê. It was released on 9 September 2024 on the independent record label 30praum. The album contains eleven tracks with one of them being a bonus track, which includes rock music influences. The album features guest appearances from Teto, Veigh and Brandão85. The production was carried out by Matuê himself, together with Brandão85 and Samuel Batista.

== Background ==
On August 5, 2024, Matuê released the surprise EP Sabor Overdose no Yakisoba as a final project under his contract with the Sony Music label, following a similar strategy to Frank Ocean's album Endless. The artist reportedly asked fans not to publicize the project. The EP includes critical commentary on the music industry, particularly in tracks like "Reza do Milhão", which addresses the challenges artists face when dealing with record companies. This release has been interpreted as a statement of artistic independence, leading up to the release of 333.

== Release and promotion ==
On 9 September 2024, Matuê marked the launch of his new album with a public performance at Vale do Anhangabaú, São Paulo. He stood on a platform displaying a countdown timer that began at noon and ended at 3:33 p.m., the moment of the album's official release and the time that alludes to the project. For more than three hours, he stood in front of the crowd. At the moment of the launch, Matuê lights a marijuana cigarette. The singer's performance sparked widespread discussion on social media and in the press.

== Musical style ==
In an interview with Billboard Brasil, Matuê explained the progression of his album, stating: "The album starts with "Crack com Mussilon" which represents a more innocent phase, less committed to the idea of conveying a truth. It's much more focused on the vibe and energy of the music". He continued, "As the album progresses, it becomes more serious, more dense, with deeper themes. The same shift happens with the music videos—the first one was more playful and innocent, but as I release more, they become more serious, more cerebral, with deeper concepts".

The final and bonus track, "Like This!", incorporates elements of electronic music and indie rock, while also being the first track Matuê has sung in English. The lyrics explore themes of entrapment and self-discovery, as the artist reflects on being "stuck in his own cage", a metaphor for personal limitations or internal struggles. Through this introspection, the track narrates a journey of confronting these challenges, ultimately leading to a sense of personal resolution. The imagery in the lyrics suggests both a sense of confinement and the determination to overcome it, capturing a duality between vulnerability and strength.

== Critical reception ==
Professional ratings
Review scores
Source	Rating
Aquele Tuim	4/5 stars
Caderno Pop	75/100
Folha de S.Paulo	4/5 stars
Monkeybuzz	Favorable
O Grito	4/5 stars

333 was met with mostly positive acclaim from various music critics. Amanda Cavalcanti, writing for Folha de S.Paulo, gave the album four stars out of five and wrote that 333 moves beyond the conventional, delivering "a more nuanced display of Matuê's artistic and personal journey" through its "drastic changes in sound" and "sophisticated compositional ideas". She noted that the album demonstrates "influences ranging from Daft Punk to Erykah Badu and soul", culminating in tracks like "Like This!" that reflect "a wave of indie rock influences".

Antônio Lira, writing for O Grito, praised 333 as a testament to Matuê's evolution as an artist, describing it as "an album that achieves its goal of storytelling, blending introspection with experimentation". While noting that the "first half feels lukewarm and less inventive compared to the latter tracks", Lira emphasized the second half's stronger creative vision, characterized by "elaborate synths, prominent guitars, and introspective lyrics". He highlighted the collaboration with producer DJ Nox as a key strength, particularly in tracks like "Like This!", which stands out as "one of the album's best" despite veering away from rap and trap. Lucas Cassoli from Monkeybuzz, noted that in 333, Matuê "uses trap as a foundation for a more inventive blend of sounds, weaving elements of psychedelia, rhythm and blues, disco, and pop", and that the album "maintains the core qualities that established Matuê as a leading figure in the Brazilian music scene but boldly opens doors to new possibilities".

== Commercial performance ==
The album achieved a new record for album streams on Spotify Brazil, becoming the most listened to album in the country during its release. Within 24 hours, the album achieved over 16 million streams, surpassing the previous record set by Luísa Sonza's Escândalo Íntimo and Taylor Swift's The Tortured Poets Department. With this mark, Matuê became the artist with the most played album in the country on the day of its release. Matuê also topped the Billboard Brasil Artistas 25 chart, securing the position of the most-streamed artist in the country following the release of his album 333.

On the Spotify Brazil Top 50 chart, 11 of the album's 12 tracks debuted on the first day. Songs including "Crack com Mussilon" and "Imagina Esse Cenário" occupied the 4th and 5th positions, respectively. On the second day, all 12 tracks were in the Top 50, with eight appearing in the Top 10. "Crack com Mussilon" reached the number one spot with over 1.45 million streams in a single day. This performance marked 333 as one of the best Matuê releases, highlighting the artist's presence in the Brazilian rap scene.

== Accolades ==
Awards and nominations for 333
Organization	Year	Category	Result	Ref.
Multishow Brazilian Music Award	2024	Album of the Year	Nominated	

== Track listing ==
All tracks are written by Matuê.

333 – Standard edition
No.	Title	Writer(s)	Producer(s)	Length
1.	"Crack com Mussilon"	Matuê, Djavan	Matuê, Brandão85, Samuel Batista	2:34
2.	"Imagina esse Cenário" (featuring Veigh)	Matuê, Veigh	Matuê	2:35
3.	"Isso é Sério" (featuring Brandão85)	Matuê, Brandão85	Matuê, Brandão85, Samuel Batista	4:45
4.	"1993"	Matuê	Matuê	2:07
5.	"4Tal" (featuring Teto)	Matuê, Teto	Matuê	3:24
6.	"O Som"	Matuê	Matuê	5:12
7.	"04AM"	Matuê	Matuê	3:19
8.	"Castlevania"	Matuê	Matuê	3:50
9.	"V de Vilão"	Matuê	Matuê	2:26
10.	"Maria"	Matuê	Matuê	3:24
11.	"333"	Matuê	Matuê	5:24
12.	"Like This!" (bonus track)	Matuê	Matuê	3:28
Total length:				42:32

== Charts ==
Weekly chart performance for 333
Chart (2024)	Peak position
Portuguese Albums (AFP)	1

== Certifications ==
Certifications for "333"
Region	Certification	Certified units/sales
Brazil (Pro-Música Brasil)	Diamond	300,000^{‡}
^{‡} Sales+streaming figures based on certification alone.
