= Não Ao Futebol Moderno =

Brazilian shoegaze band

- Origin: Porto Alegre, Rio Grande do Sul, Brazil
- Genres: Shoegaze; dream pop; alternative rock; emo
- Years active: 2014–2017; 2025–present
- Members: Kílary Burtet; Pedro Appel; Marco Bueno

Não Ao Futebol Moderno is a Brazilian shoegaze band formed in 2014 in Porto Alegre, Rio Grande do Sul. Initially influenced by 1990s emo, the band gained attention with their debut extended play (EP) Onde Anda Chico Flores?, released through the independent label Umbaduba Records, which they co-founded. They released the 2016 album, Vida Que Segue, which marked a stylistic shift toward shoegaze, dream pop, and lo-fi production and received generally positive reception, before splitting up in 2017 and returning years later in 2025.

== History ==
Forming in 2014 in the city of Porto Alegre, Rio Grande do Sul, Não Ao Futebol Moderno comprised Kílary Burtet, Felipe, Pedro, and Marco. The band gained early attention with the release of their debut extended play (EP), Onde Anda Chico Flores?, through Umbaduba Records, a label founded the same year by a collective of musicians that included members of the band. Burtet is also involved in managing the label.

The EP is characterized by its concise length—approximately eleven minutes— and its clear connection to 1990s emo, drawing influence from bands such as Slint, American Football, and Descartes (from Rio Grande do Sul). It features slow, melancholic melodies, introspective lyrics, and expressive vocals that alternate between restraint and anguished screaming. Tracks such as "San Martin" express sadness, while others like "Convergência" and "Lição para Vícios Inúteis" explore themes of personal transformation and emotional conflict.

On 15 July 2016, the band released their first studio album, Vida Que Segue, also through Umbaduba Records. The album marked a notable departure from the raw emo sound of their debut EP, with the album and the band moving towards shoegaze, dream pop, alternative rock, and a psychedelic and lo-fi production. The band's stylistic evolution reflected a broader range of influences, including 1980s jangle pop and post-punk, as well as contemporary artists such as Real Estate and Mac DeMarco. References to classic shoegaze bands like Slowdive and Ride are also present.

The album's lyrics continue the band's focus on themes of youth and melancholy but are presented in a more understated and conversational tone. The album was reviewed positively by André Felipe de Medeiros of Monkeybuzz, who rated it 8 out of 10, and Cleber Facchi of Música Instantânea, who gave it an 8.5 out of 10. According to Facchi, Vida Que Segue adopts a more atmospheric and textural sound while preserving the emo qualities present in the band's earlier work. He has also compared songs like "Janeiro" and "Peso Pesar" to Atlas by Real Estate, Salad Days by Mac DeMarco, and the works of the Smiths and DIIV. According to Lucas Paraizo of Escotilha, the track "Laços de Família" features clean, echo-laden guitar work reminiscent of the Brazilian band Wolken.

In 2017, Não Ao Futebol Moderno was included in a widely circulated list on the publishing platform Medium that compiled anonymous accusations of abusive and sexist behavior involving musicians from the Brazilian independent music scene. The list, prompted by a public allegation against a member of another band, featured over 20 artists and was based on screenshots and personal testimonies submitted to its curator. In the case of Não Ao Futebol Moderno, the accusation did not involve claims of abuse or misconduct by women, but rather came from a man who alleged inappropriate behavior by a member of the group. The band responded by denying any wrongdoing, stating that the claim had been misrepresented and was rooted in personal conflict. They questioned the credibility of the report and emphasized that no women had come forward with accusations against them. The band disbanded later that year.

In September 2025, the band announced a reformation, alongside the release of their album Pequenos Prazeres on Instagram.

== Discography ==
=== Albums ===
- Vida Que Segue (2016)
- Pequenos Prazeres (2025)

=== EPs ===
- Onde Anda Chico Flores? (2014)
