= 2020 MTV MIAW Awards Brazil =

2020 Award Show

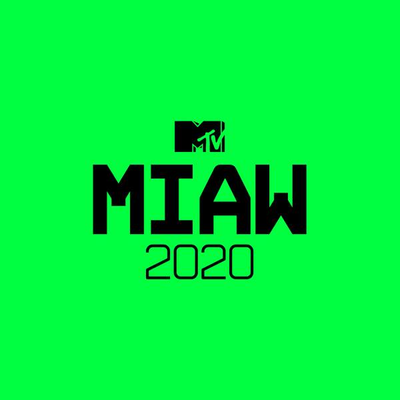
- Date: September 24, 2020
- Venue: Estudios Quanta (São Paulo)
- Country: Brazil
- Hosted by: Bruna Marquezine and Manu Gavassi

Highlights
- Most wins: Anitta, Bianca Andrade, Lady Gaga and Manu Gavassi (2 each)
- Most nominations: Anitta, Emicida, Ludmilla and Luísa Sonza (5 each)
- Website: www.mtv.com.br

Television/radio coverage
- Network: MTV; Comedy Central; Paramount Network

The 2020 MTV MIAW Awards Brazil were held on September 24, 2020. The show was broadcast live from MTV (Brazil) and had Bruna Marquezine and Manu Gavassi as hosts for the first time. Nominees were announced on August 20, 2020.

Anitta, Bianca Andrade, Lady Gaga and Manu Gavassi were the most awarded artists of the night, with 2 awards each.

== Performers ==
Artist	Song
Anitta, Cardi B & Myke Towers	"Me Gusta"
Djonga	"O Cara de Óculos" "Otopatama" "Olho de Tigre"
Luan Santana & Agnes Nunes	"Asas"
Ludmilla	"Amor Difícil" "Invocada" "Verdinha"
Luísa Sonza, MC Zaac & Vitão	"Braba" "Toma" "Flores"
Manu Gavassi, Gloria Groove & Lucas Silveira	"Deve Ser Horrível Dormir Sem Mim"
Pabllo Vittar	"Amor de Que"
Pedro Sampaio & Pocah & Tati Zaqui	"Depois da Quarentena" "Surtada" "Sentadão"

== Winners and nominees ==
Winners are listed first and highlighted in bold

Musical Artist	Best Music Video
**Anitta**: Anavitória; Emicida; Ludmilla; Luísa Sonza; Pabllo Vittar; Pedro Sampaio; Vitor Kley	**"Áudio de Desculpas" — Manu Gavassi**: "Amor de Que" — Pabllo Vittar; "Calendário" — Anavitória; "Diaba" — Urias; "Eu Vou" — Hot e Oreia feat. Djonga; "Partilhar" — Rubel & Anavitória; "Silêncio" — Emicida; "Verdinha" — Ludmilla
Anthem of the Year	Feat. National
**"Amor de Que" — Pabllo Vittar**: "Braba" — Luísa Sonza; "Desce Pro Play (Pa Pa Pa)" — MC Zaac with Anitta & Tyga; "Menina Solta" — Giulia Be; "Pupila" — Vitor Kley & Anavitória; "Sentadão" — Pedro Sampaio with Felipe Original & JS o Mão de Ouro; "Surtada (Brega Funk Remix)" — Dadá Boladão, Tati Zaqui feat. OIK; "Verdinha" — Ludmilla	**"Combatchy" — Anitta feat. Lexa, Luísa Sonza & MC Rebecca**: "Desce Pro Play (Pa Pa Pa)" — MC Zaac with Anitta & Tyga; "Eterna Sacanagem" — Jottapê, Kevinho & MC Kekel; "Flores" — Vitão & Luísa Sonza; "Romance Proibido" — Kevin o Chris feat. Ferrugem; "Será" — Lagum feat. Iza; "Só Ficou o Cheiro" — Rael feat. Melim; "Tangerina" — Tiago Iorc feat. Duda Beat
Global Hit	Feat. Gringo
**"Rain on Me" — Lady Gaga & Ariana Grande**: "Blinding Lights" — The Weeknd; "Break My Heart" — Dua Lipa; "Circles" — Post Malone; "Everything I Wanted" — Billie Eilish; "I Love Me" — Demi Lovato; "Say So" — Doja Cat feat. Nicki Minaj; "Watermelon Sugar" — Harry Styles	**"Sour Candy" — Lady Gaga & Blackpink**: "I'm Ready" — Sam Smith feat. Demi Lovato; "Rain on Me" — Lady Gaga & Ariana Grande; "Savage" — Megan Thee Stallion feat. Beyoncé; "Say So" — Doja Cat feat. Nicki Minaj; "Stuck with U" — Ariana Grande & Justin Bieber
Best Video Made In Home	Hino de Karaokê em Casa
**"Depois da Quarentena" — Pocah**: "De Novo" — Xamã; "Hoje Eu Quero Me Perder" — Lagum; "House Arrest" — Sofi Tukker & Gorgon City; "Mascaradinha" — Tati Zaqui & Thiaguinho MT; "O Amor É o Segredo" — Vitor Kley; "Todo Carinho" — Duda Beat; "Tô Presa em Casa" — MC Rebecca	**"Supera" — Marília Mendonça**: "A Gente Fez Amor" — Gusttavo Lima; "Aí Eu Bebo" — Maiara & Maraisa; "Asas" — Luan Santana; "Mentira" — Felipe Araújo; "Na Cama Que Eu Paguei" — Wesley Safadão feat. Zé Neto & Cristiano; "Tudo Aconteceu" — MC Du Black & Delacruz; "Tudo Ok" — Thiaguinho MT feat. Mila & JS O Mão de Ouro
Beat BR	Zika do Baile
**Djonga**: Drik Barbosa; Emicida; Filipe Ret; Hungria Hip Hop; Matuê; Orochi; Xamã	**PK**: Jottapê; Kevin o Chris; MC Du Black; MC Rebecca; MC Zaac; Pocah; Tati Zaqui
DJ Lanso a Braba	Fandom Real_Oficial
**Pedro Sampaio**: Alok; Dennis DJ; DJ GBR; Papatinho; Rennan da Penha; Tropkillaz; WC no Beat	**"BTS Army" — BTS**: "Anitters" — Anitta; "Blink" — Blackpink; "Harries" — Harry Styles; "Little Monsters" — Lady Gaga; "Loves" — Dua Lipa; "Ludmillers" — Ludmilla
Live das Lives #BREAKTHEINTERNET	Live Pra Tudo
**Ivete Sangalo**: Alok; Caetano Veloso; Dennis DJ; Gilberto Gil; Luísa Sonza; Marília Mendonça; Sandy & Junior; Wesley Safadão	**Boca a Boca — Bianca Andrade**: Chico Salgado; Fábio Porchat; No Estúdio com o Ex — Matheus Mazzafera; Teresa Cristina
MIAW Icon	Falou Tudo
**Manu Gavassi**: Atila Iamarino; Babu Santana; Emicida; Felipe Neto; Ludmilla; Maisa Silva; Pabllo Vittar	**Gabi Oliveira with Felipe Neto & Yuri Marçal**: Drauzio Varella; Emicida; Gabriela Prioli; Gregório Duvivier
Maratonei	MIAW Bet
**Euphoria**: Auto Posto; Too Hot to Handle; De Férias com o Ex; Elite; Hunters; The Handmaid's Tale	**Sidoka**: Agnes Nunes; Audino Vilão; Gabi Oliveira (DePretas); Hiran; Lucca Najar; Luccas Luccas; Nath Finanças
Best Reality Show Participant	Ri Alto
**Rafa Vieira — De Férias com o Ex 6**: Babu Santana — Big Brother Brasil 20; Bifão — A Fazenda 11; Matheus "Novinho" — De Férias com o Ex 6; Scarlat Ciola — De Férias com o Ex 6	**Bruna Louise**: Fábio Porchat; Gregório Duvivier; Marcelo Adnet; Rafael Portugal; Thati Lopes; Thiago Ventura; Yuri Marçal
Imagine Together	Best Podcast
**Taís Araújo & Thelma Assis**: Djamila Ribeiro & Linn da Quebrada; Drauzio Varella & Atila Iamarino; Fábio Porchat & Rafael Portugal; Sabrina Sato & Chico Salgado	**Não Ouvo**: Angu de Grilo; Bom Dia, Obvious; Esquizofrenoias; Mamilos; NerdCast; POUCAS; Um Milkshake Chamado Wanda; Creators Podcast
Pet Influencer	Streamer BR
**"Lua" — Bianca Andrade**: "Cerveja" — Gabi Prado; "Feijão" — Gui Araújo; "Marroninha" — Hugo Gloss; "Tibau" e "Tita" — Coelhanna	**Alanzoka**: Anderson Silva; Camila Camilota Silveira; Gaules; YoDa
Absurd Creator	App of the Year
**Batom Atrevido**: Cinthia Cruz; Gessica Kayane; Lucas Guedez; Luis Mariz; Maisa Silva; Mario Junior	**TikTok**: Instagram; Twitch; Twitter; WhatsApp
Game of the Year	Quarantine Meme
**The Last of Us Part II**: Animal Crossing: New Horizons; Final Fantasy VII Remake; Fortnite Mobile; Ghost of Tsushima; Mario Kart Tour; PUBG - Season 14; Valorant	**"Não sinto verdade em vc"**: Cardi B yelling Coronavirus; "Eu Sou Bandida"; Roi Letícia; Rotinas do Home Office
Best Challenge	MIAW Transform
**Roi Letícia**: "Don't Start Now" Challenge; Flip the Switch; I'm Just a Kid; Oh Nanana; "Savage" Challenge; Wipe It Down; #tudonosigilochallenge	**Linn da Quebrada**; **Noca da Portela**; **Amanda Ferreira**; **CUFA**
