= Wiu (rapper) =

Brazilian rapper (born 2002)

- Born: Vinicius William Sales de Lima; 16 February 2002 (age 24); Fortaleza, Ceará, Brazil
- Genres: Hip hop; trap; reggaeton
- Occupations: Rapper; singer; songwriter
- Instrument: Voice
- Years active: 2017–present
- Label: 30praum

Vinicius William Sales de Lima (born 16 February 2002), known professionally as Wiu, is a Brazilian rapper, singer and songwriter. He is recognized for his singles such as "Felina", "Horas Iguais", "Coração de Gelo" and the album Manual de Como Amar Errado, released in 2022.

== Career ==
Born in Fortaleza, Ceará, Lima had a strong connection to hip-hop when he was a child, producing music at a young age, using the music production program FL Studio. At the age of 14, in 2017, he released his first song, "Trvpical Mixtape", as an independent singer through SoundCloud and YouTube under the name W$LL. In 2019, he was invited by Matuê to be part of the 30praum record label. That same year, Lima released his first single "Sucrilhos". In 2021, he signed a contract with Sony Music under licence from 30praum. Lima worked on the production of Máquina do Tempo, Matuê's debut album.

In 2022 he released his first album Manual de Como Amar Errado, with influences of trap, reggaeton and afro pop. Lima has received certifications from Pro-Música Brasil for the singles "Coração de Gelo", "Vampiro" and "Mantém", earning 3× diamond, 3× diamond and 2× platinum, respectively. In 2024, Lima released his second studio album, Vagabundo de Luxo, a trap album that incorporates experimental elements. The track "Rainha da Finesse" combines trap influences with jersey club, funk carioca and reggaeton. That same year, he collaborated with Teto on the song "Problemas de um Milionário".

== Discography ==
=== Studio albums ===
- Manual de Como Amar Errado (2022)
- Vagabundo de Luxo (2024)
- 808 CLUB: AFTER (2025)

=== Extended plays (EPs) ===
- Um Pequeno Álbum De Natal (2023)
- 808 CLUB (2025)

=== Singles ===
- 2019: "Sucrilhos"
- 2019: "Mantém"
- 2021: "Pitbull"
- 2021: "Lágrimas de Crocodilo"
- 2022: "Vampiro"
- 2022: "Felina"
- 2022: "Horas Iguais"
- 2023: "Flow Espacial"
- 2023: "Tenho Que Me Decidir"
- 2024: "Problemas de um Milionário"
- 2024: "Rainha da Finesse"
- 2024: "Balanço de Rede"

== Awards ==
Year	Nominated work	Category	Award	Result	Notes	Ref.
2022	Vampiro	Hymn of the Year	MTV MIAW Awards Brazil	Nominated	Featuring Matuê and Teto	
2022	Vampiro	Feat. Nacional	MTV MIAW Awards Brazil	Nominated	Featuring Matuê and Teto	
2022	Vampiro	Song of the Year	Multishow Brazilian Music Awards	Nominated	Featuring Matuê and Teto	
