= Rock triste =

Brazilian 2010s rock movement originating in Belo Horizonte

- Stylistic origins: Alternative rock; shoegaze; post-rock; dream pop; post-hardcore; math rock; emo revival; folk; MPB
- Cultural origins: Early 2010s, Belo Horizonte, Minas Gerais, Brazil

Other topics
- Indie music scene

Rock triste (pronounced [ˈhɔ.ki ˈtɾis.t͡ʃi]; Portuguese for 'sad rock') is a Brazilian independent movement that originated in Belo Horizonte, Minas Gerais, in the early 2010s. The movement's music draws on alternative rock, shoegaze, post-rock, dream pop, post-hardcore, math rock, emo revival, and Brazilian popular music. Rock triste lyrics and arrangements are often melancholic and introspective, and explore existential questions and philosophical reflections on life, human relationships, and youth.

Rock triste developed within a local independent music scene in which young musicians faced limited opportunities to perform and promote music outside established cultural institutions and networks. The alternative rock band Lupe de Lupe is considered an important act in the movement's emergence, with its frontman Vitor Brauer and musician Jonathan Tadeu co-founding the Geração Perdida de Minas Gerais (lit. 'Lost Generation of Minas Gerais'), an independent collective that adapted a do-it-yourself (DIY) ethos and supported unaffiliated artists in recording, releasing and promoting their music. Initially associated with Belo Horizonte, rock triste gradually became associated with independent bands and artists from other Brazilian states, including São Paulo, Rio de Janeiro, Goiás, Paraná and Rio Grande do Sul.

== Characteristics ==
Rock triste is associated with musical influences from 1990s alternative rock, British shoegaze, post-rock, and dream pop, post-hardcore, math rock, emo revival, folk music, as well as Brazilian popular music. Its sound is characterized by arrangements that evoke melancholic and introspective moods, while its lyrics often explore existential questions and philosophical reflections on life, human relationships, youth, and maturation.

== History ==
The movement grew out of a feeling of non-belonging among young independent musicians who felt alienated from Belo Horizonte's dominant musical institutions. At the time, the local indie and cultural landscape was largely centered around revivals of the 1970s Clube da Esquina movement or MPB-infused indie acts, such as Graveola e o Lixo Polifônico. Artists playing noisier, more distorted, or melancholic rock found very little space in mainstream local venues or media. Furthermore, traditional avenues for alternative audiences were shrinking: alternative media outlets like Rede Minas's Alto-Falante program faced state broadcasting constraints, while local venue capacities and turnout for original rock shows steadily declined. Many young musicians had moved to Belo Horizonte from smaller towns across Minas Gerais, but often lacked industry connections, access to state funding, and ties to established professional networks.

The alternative rock band Lupe de Lupe played a significant role in the emergence of the rock triste movement. Active in Belo Horizonte since 2009, they released early recordings such as the extended play (EP) Recreio (2011) and the studio album Sal Grosso (2012) while facing difficulties finding opportunities in the city's established venues and festivals. Around 2013, its frontman Vitor Brauer and Jonathan Tadeu (the producer of Quase Coadjuvante) co-founded the Geração Perdida de Minas Gerais (lit. 'Lost Generation of Minas Gerais'), an independent collective aimed at supporting unaffiliated artists record, release, and promote their music without corporate or label support. The collective operated within a strict do-it-yourself (DIY) ethos, with members collaborating on one another's songs by playing instruments, assisting with audio mixing and sharing equipment. The collective also organized performances at independent venues in Belo Horizonte like Casa do Jornalista, A Obra, and Autêntica.

In 2014, Lupe de Lupe released the double album Quarup and undertook a self-funded national tour comprising 28 shows across four regions of Brazil. Tadeu joined Lupe de Lupe as their touring bassist during this run. Immediately following the grueling national tour, Lupe de Lupe announced an indefinite hiatus, primarily because one of the band members moved out of Brazil. However, the tour influenced a wave of younger musicians from Minas Gerais, who have been welcomed into the collective. Fábio de Carvalho, who began composing after discovering Lupe de Lupe in 2013, recorded his debut album Tudo em Vão (2015) in Vitor Brauer's bedroom, Tadeu pursued a solo career, releasing Queda Livre in 2016, and Fernando Motta released Andando Sem Olhar Pra Frente (2016), a guitar-oriented album associated with slowcore.

Artists associated with the Geração Perdida de Minas Gerais also developed connections with independent labels and collectives elsewhere in Brazil. Bichano Records, an independent label based in Rio de Janeiro and founded by Fred Zgur, released music by bands such as Gorduratrans and Nvblado, which were associated with the emo revival scene. The label released Minas Gerais trio El Toro Fuerte's debut album, Um Tempo Lindo Pra Estar Vivo (2016), and collaborated on events such as Bichano Fest BH, which featured bands from São Paulo and Belo Horizonte. In November 2016, musicians associated with the movement, including Tadeu, Carvalho, Motta and El Toro Fuerte, performed together at the Festival Perdido, held at the Breve venue in São Paulo. Around 2016, online fans began using the term rock triste to describe the introspective and melancholic tone associated with the music of these contemporary independent artists. Bands and artists gradually embraced the label, often half-ironically.

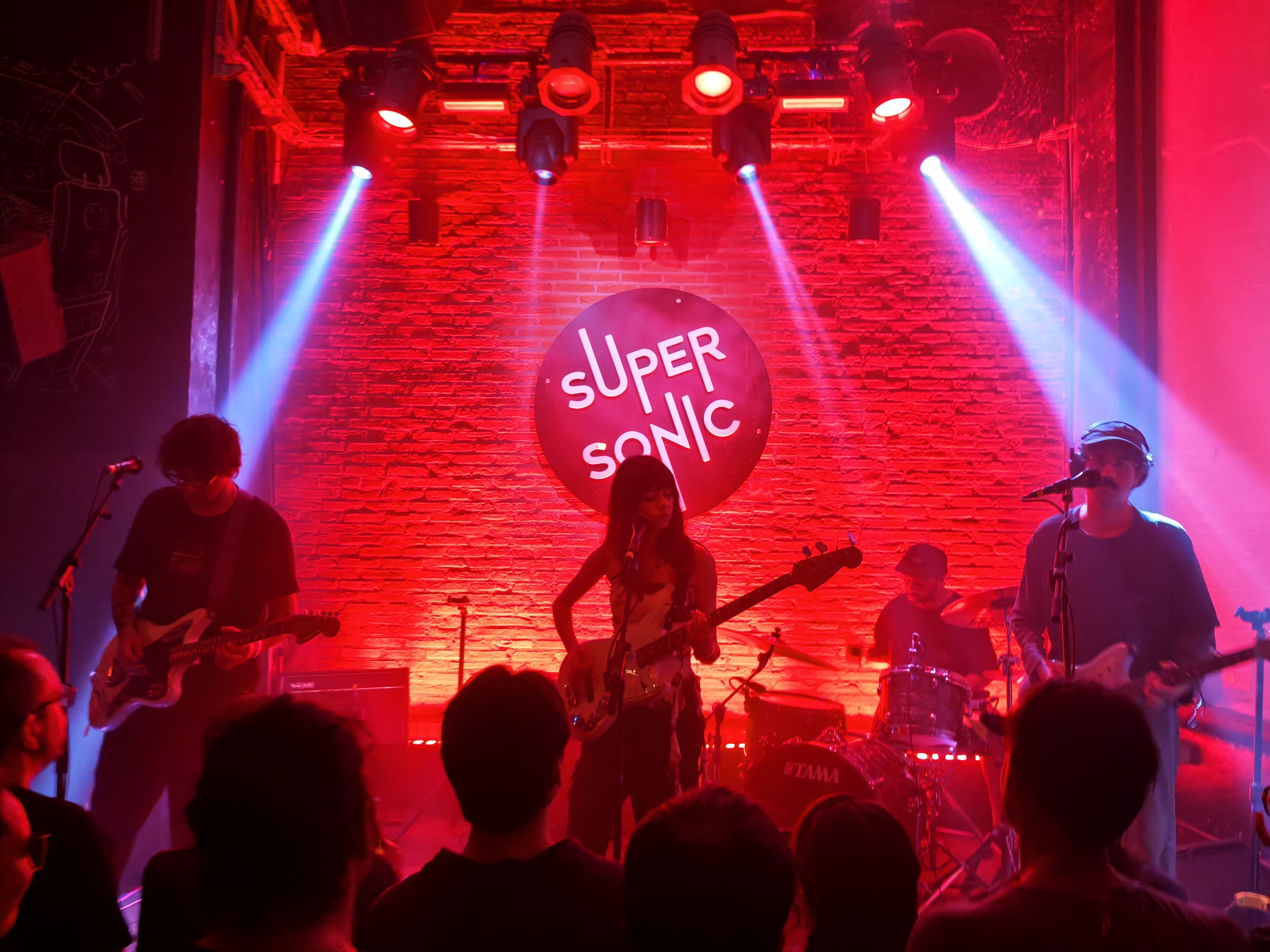
Terraplana is one of the bands associated with the expansion of rock triste beyond Minas Gerais.

Although rock triste initially emerged around the independent music scene in Belo Horizonte, the term came to be associated with bands artists from other parts of Brazil. These included Terno Rei, Eliminadorzinho, Raça, and Ombu, from São Paulo, Gorduratrans, from Rio de Janeiro, Bruna Mendez and Brvnks, from Goiás, Terraplana, Tuyo, and Fogo Caminha Comigo, from Paraná, Bella e o Olmo da Bruxa, and Quem é Você, Alice?, from Rio Grande do Sul, La Leuca, from Santa Catarina, Amandinho, from Pernambuco, Emerald Hill, from Paraíba, and Born To Freedom, from Rio Grande do Norte. In April 2020, during the COVID-19 pandemic, Brauer and other musicians associated with the scene organized the charitable project Rock Triste Contra o Coronavírus. Initiated with a cover of Arnaldo Antunes's "Lavar as Mãos" recorded by Brauer, the project developed into a series of weekly digital releases on Bandcamp, featuring covers performed by a total of 44 independent Brazilian artists. Proceeds from the releases were donated to the Movimento de Luta nos Bairros, Vilas e Favelas (MLB) to support the distribution of basic food supplies and hygiene products for over 15,000 homeless and vulnerable communities.
