= Wizen =

Wizen is a surname. Notable people with the surname include:

- Boris Wizen, a character in the game Suikoden II
- Effi Wizen (born 1956), Israeli computer animator and visual effects specialist
- Ridley Wizen, a character in the game Suikoden II
