= Clara Lima =

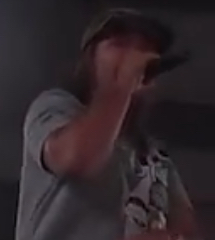
- Clara Lima in 2016

Background information
- Born: Ana Clara Silva de Lima; 13 July 1999 (age 26); Belo Horizonte, Brazil
- Genres: Hip hop
- Occupations: Rapper; singer; composer; actress

Ana Clara Silva de Lima (born 13 July 1999), better known as Clara Lima, is a Brazilian rapper, singer, composer, and actress. She became famous in the mid-2010s after winning various rap battles in the Duelo de MCs matches in Belo Horizonte, later becoming successful with her collaborations with DV tribo.

== Career ==
After becoming well known in the hip hop scene of Minas Gerais for reaching the final of Duelo Nacional de MCs, Clara Lima went on to become a member of DV tribo, a group made up of various well-known rappers from Minas Gerais, including Djonga, FBC, and Hot e Oreia.

Her first solo EP was Transgressão, produced by the record label Ceia.

In 2019, Lima released the EP Selfie. It was produced by Gee Rocha and Go Dassisti.

In 2021, she released her third EP, Só Sei Falar de Amor shows Lima's more intimate side.

Also in 2021, Lima was invited to become a judge for the final of Red Bull FrancaMente, the Brazilian version of the international rap battle organization that brings together rappers and fans throughout Brazil.

Also in 2021, she ended her contract with Ceia, Lima signed with Dip Muzic in 2021, a record producer from São Paulo who as works with other big artists such as Sant and PrimeiraMente. However, she began her collaboration with Dip Muzic the year before, when she was invited to the launch of the record's first production: Nascer, a single with Lucas Gali and NP Vocal.

In 2022, she released the Ep Que Vem da Alma. With 10 songs, it was produced by Teo Guedx. In the songs, she brings messages of positivity to her fans, indicating a new moment in her career. All the songs were accompanied by music videos that reflect the high-spirited nature of the EP.
