= MTV MIAW Awards Brazil =

Brazilian annual awards

- Previous: 2022 MTV MIAW Awards Brazil
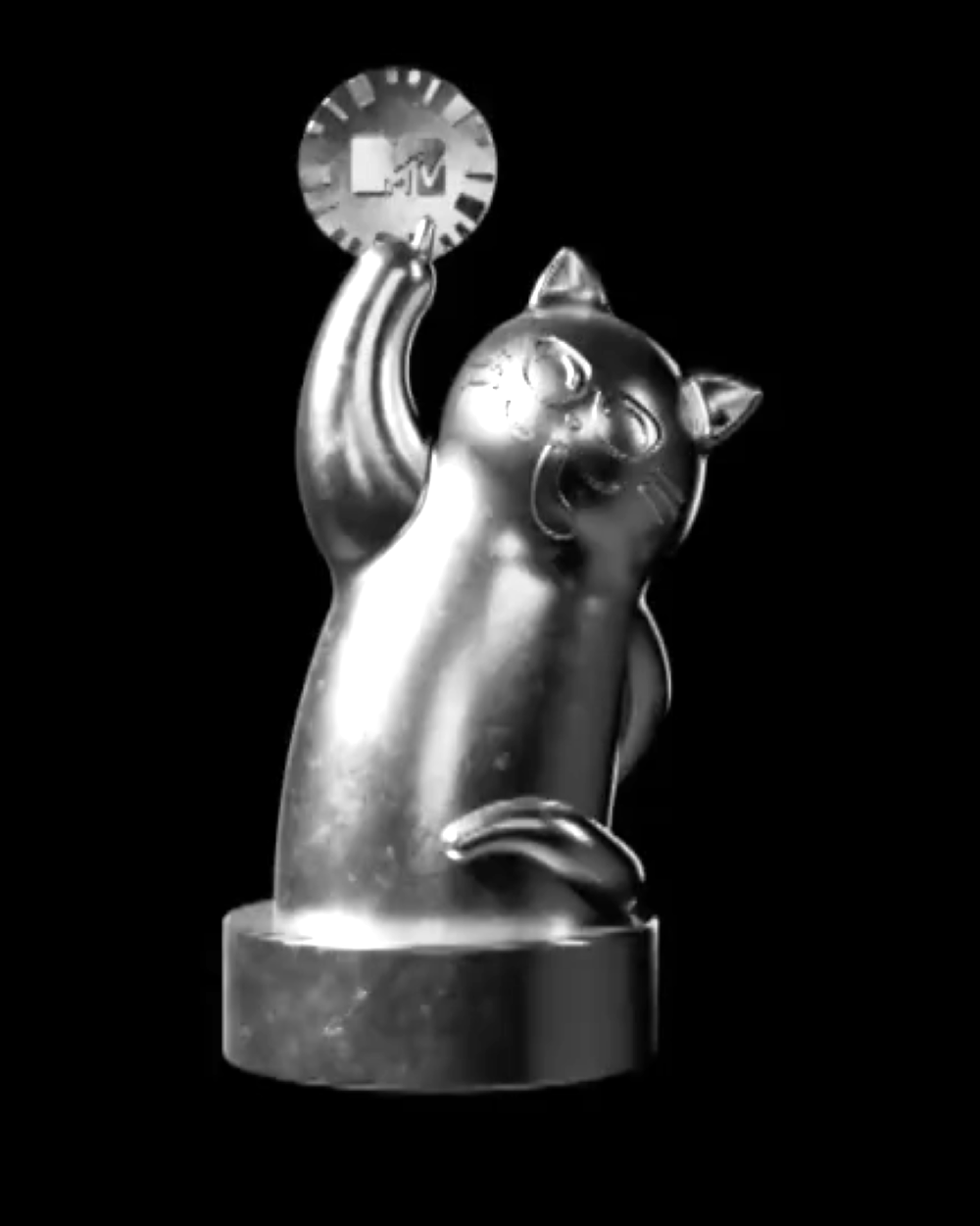
- Awarded for: the best of the millennial generation
- Country: Brazil
- Presented by: MTV Brazil
- First award: 24 May 2018; 8 years ago
- Website: miaw.mtv.com.br

The MTV MIAW Awards Brazil (commonly abbreviated as MTV MIAW BR) were established by MTV Brazil in 2018 to celebrate music, television and internet artists. The first edition happened in May 2018 and was hosted by Whindersson Nunes in São Paulo, Brazil.

Nominations for the 2019 edition were announced in May 2019.

== List of ceremonies ==
| Year | Date | Venue | Host City | Host | MIAW Icon Winner | Ref. |
|---|---|---|---|---|---|---|
| 2018 | 24 May | Credicard Hall | São Paulo | Whindersson Nunes | Felipe Neto | |
| 2019 | 4 July | Credicard Hall | São Paulo | Hugo Gloss and Sabrina Sato | Bruna Marquezine | |
| 2020 | 24 September | Estudios Quanta | São Paulo | Bruna Marquezine and Manu Gavassi | Manu Gavassi | |
| 2021 | 23 September | Estudios Quanta | São Paulo | Pabllo Vittar and Rafael Portugal | Juliette Freire | |
| 2022 | 26 July | Vibra Hall | São Paulo | Camila Queiroz and Xamã | Gkay | |

== Categories ==
- MIAW Icon
- Super Squad
- Crush do Ano
- Vício do Ano
- Passinho Viral
- Oi, Meninas
- Insta BR
- Selfie do Ano
- Shade do Ano
- Meme do Ano
- Paródia do Ano
- Gamer do Ano
- YouTube do Ano
- Aposta Digital
- Fandom do Ano
- Pet do Ano
- Série do Ano
- Melhor Reality
- Artista Musical
- Clipe do Ano
- Hino do Ano
- Hit Internacional
- Feat. do Ano
- Hino de Karaoke
- Explosão K-Pop
- #PRESTATENÇÃO
- Beat BR
- Prêmio Pró-Social

== Most wins ==
| Artist | Number of awards |
|---|---|
| Anitta | 8 |
| BTS | 5 |
| Felipe Neto | 4 |
| Lady Gaga | 3 |
| Luísa Sonza | 3 |
| Blackpink | 2 |
| Júlio Cocielo | 2 |
| Whindersson Nunes | 2 |
| Johnny Hooker | 2 |
| J Balvin | 2 |
| MC Zaac | 2 |
| Tropkillaz | 2 |
| Carlinhos Maia | 2 |
| Tata Estaniecki | 2 |
| MC WM | 2 |
| Bianca Andrade | 2 |
| Pabllo Vittar | 2 |
| Manu Gavassi | 2 |

== Performances ==
| Year | Performers |
|---|---|
| 2018 | Pabllo Vittar & Attooxxá; Alok & Zeeba & Iro; Jojo Maronttinni; Haikaiss & Whindersson Nunes; 1Kilo; Kevinho & Tropkillaz & Busy Signal; 2B & Pollo & Cynthia Luz; Anitta & MC Zaac & Maejor |
| 2019 | Anitta & Ludmilla; Anavitória & Vitor Kley; Emicida & Majur & Pabllo Vittar; Tiago Iorc; Heavy Baile & MC Rebecca & Pocah & Kevin O Chris; Halsey |
| 2020 | Anitta & Cardi B & Myke Towers; Luísa Sonza & Vitão & MC Zaac; Manu Gavassi & Gloria Groove & Lucas Silveira; Pabllo Vittar; Ludmilla; Pocah & Tati Zaqui & Pedro Sampaio; Djonga; Luan Santana & Agnes Nunes |

== See also ==
- Los Premios MTV Latinoamérica
- MTV Africa Music Awards
- MTV Europe Music Awards
- MTV MIAW Awards
- MTV Video Music Awards
- MTV Video Music Brasil
