= Mahmed =

Brazilian instrumental rock band

- Origin: Natal, Rio Grande do Norte, Brazil
- Genres: Instrumental rock
- Years active: 2013–present
- Members: Walter Nazário; Rodolfo Almeida; Leandro Menezes; Ian Medeiros
- Past members: Dimetrius Ferreira

Mahmed is a Brazilian instrumental rock band formed in 2013 in Natal, Rio Grande do Norte.

== History ==
=== 2013–2014: Formation and early years ===
Forming in 2013 in the city of Natal, Rio Grande do Norte, Mahmed consists of Walter Nazário (guitar, synthesizers), Dimetrius Ferreira (guitar), Leandro Menezes (bass), and Ian Medeiros (drums). Prior to the band's formation, Ferreira and Menezes had collaborated musically and editorially, producing a fanzine and participating in other bands. Nazário was discovered by Ferreira through SoundCloud, leading to the early collaborations that established the group's sound. Medeiros initially contributed drums to the band's first EP before joining as a full member.

The name Mahmed carries multiple meanings for the band, according to a Revista Pagu interview. It references the Arabic form of Jesus, recalls a personal friend named Mamede, and evokes the Portuguese words mar ('sea') and medicina ('medicine'), reflecting recurring themes in their music such as healing and natural imagery. The band's debut extended play (EP), Domínio das Águas e dos Céus, was released independently in 2013, which comprised three tracks. It was well-received by Gabriel Rolim of Monkeybuzz, which he commented for its "medicinal" quality and ability to create sensations of relief.

=== 2015–2017: Debut album Sobre a Vida em Comunidade and critical acclaim ===
In 2015, Mahmed released their debut studio album, Sobre a Vida em Comunidade, through Balaclava Records. Its compositions feature samples, live recordings, and collaborations, including JJ Nunes on "AaaaAAAaAaAaA" and an audiobook excerpt by Virgínia Lane on "Vale das Rosas". The album's cover art and title were derived from A Mitologia do Descompasso, a work by visual artist Flávio Grão, with whom the band has a longstanding collaborative relationship.

The album received critical acclaim and was ranked sixth in Monkeybuzz's list of the best albums of the year, as well as in a Música Instantânea list of the 100 greatest Brazilian albums of the 2010s. To mark the first anniversary of Sobre a Vida em Comunidade, Mahmed released the EP Ciao, Inércia in 2016. The three-track release was funded via a crowdfunding campaign and distributed on 7-inch vinyl. It was also supported by Balaclava, the same label that had facilitated the band's participation in Primavera Sound 2016, held in Barcelona from 1 to 5 June. It was described by Lucas Cassoli of Monkeybuzz as "short, although very profound" and reinforcing the band's identity and emotional depth.

=== 2018–present: Sinto Muito and lineup changes ===
Mahmed's second studio album, Sinto Muito, was released in 2018, again through Balaclava. It marked a stylistic evolution, featuring more structured compositions, layered production, and the increased presence of vocals. The album included collaborations with artists such as Luísa Nascim (Luísa e Os Alquimistas), Molly Hamilton (Widowspeak), and Santiago Mazzoli (Raça). Tracks like "Intro" incorporated audio samples from television and film, including Fight Club, while "Bosque" featured shortwave radio samples from UVB-76. Following the album's release, founding guitarist Dimetrius Ferreira departed from the band. He later launched a solo project, Delusis, and released his debut EP Imerso in 2025. Guitarist Rodolfo Almeida, who also plays in the band Fukai, joined Mahmed as his replacement.

== Members ==
=== Current members ===
- Walter Nazário – guitar, synthesizers (2013–present)
- Leandro Menezes – bass (2013–present)
- Ian Medeiros – drums (2013–present)
- Rodolfo Almeida – guitar (2018–present)

=== Former members ===
- Dimetrius Ferreira – guitar (2013–2018)

== Discography ==
=== Studio albums ===
- Sobre a Vida em Comunidade (2015)
- Sinto Muito (2018)

=== EPs ===
- Domínio das Águas e dos Céus (2013)
- Ciao, Inércia (2016)
