= Sabor Overdose no Yakisoba =

EP by Matuê
- Released: 5 August 2024
- Recorded: 2020
- Genre: Hip-hop; trap; jersey club
- Length: 9:32
- Language: Portuguese
- Label: Sony Music
- Producer: Matuê, Brandão85, WIU

Matuê chronology
Máquina do Tempo (2020)	Sabor Overdose no Yakisoba (2024)	333 (2024)

Singles from Sabor Overdose no Yakisoba
- 1. "A Última Dança" / "Honey Babe" / "Reza do Milhão" Released: 4 August 2024

Sabor Overdose no Yakisoba is the debut extended play by Brazilian rapper Matuê. It was released on 5 August 2024 on the record label Sony Music, under exclusive license from 30praum. It was released as a way out of his record deal with Sony Music. The EP has three tracks, the last of which, called "Reza do Milhão", already had a preview that was posted by Matuê on his Instagram Stories in 2020.

The extended play's title forms an acronym and is, a criticism to the partnership of his record label at the time, SONY, alongside the cover, a symbolism, representing the singer and several men's hands wearing jackets, and "shoving a spoon down the throat" of the artist, the men being the representation of the record company's executives. The cover symbolizes the artist refusing a new contract with the record company, despite financial offers or even the record company wanting to impose a path for his career.

== Background ==
On August 5, 2024, Matuê released the surprise EP Sabor Overdose no Yakisoba, marking the end of his distribution contract with Sony Music due to differences over contractual terms and a desire for greater autonomy in managing royalties and artistic direction. The release strategy has been compared to Frank Ocean's album Endless, reportedly asking fans not to publicize the project. The EP includes critiques of the music industry, particularly in the track "Reza do Milhão", which addresses the challenges artists face when dealing with record companies, to be seen as a diss track. This release has been interpreted as a statement of artistic independence, serving as a precursor to Matuê's upcoming album, 333, which was released independently under his record label 30praum.

== Musical style ==
Sabor Overdose No Yakisoba blends a variety of influences to create a sound that both honors his roots and pushes creative boundaries, exploring themes such as love, violence, fame, and success. The opening track, "A Última Dança", introduces a mix of American R&B and jersey club, reflecting on the complexities of relationships, evident in lines like: "Eu não vou fazer por fazer / Eu não sou mais o de antes" ('I'm not going to do it just to do it / I'm not the same as before'). The beats are soft yet rhythmic, supporting introspective lyrics that examine love and loss. In "Honey Babe", Matuê continues to experiment with trap beats, while also celebrating his success and proudness of its Northeastern roots, emphasizing his identity with a catchy refrain, reflected in lines such as: "Ó os moleque do Nordeste na Lambo, huh / Acumulando o milhão" ('Look at the guys from the Northeast in the Lambo, huh / Accumulating millions'). The final track, "Reza do Milhão" takes a more resilient approach, with beats that amplify the track’s message of perseverance and self-empowerment, stating: "Tentaram me derrubar / Não passa nada / Daqui você jamais passará" ('They tried to bring me down / Nothing gets through / You will never pass here').

== Critical reception ==
Alícia Cavalcante, writing for Aquele Tuim, gave the EP four stars out of five and noted that the EP is "a highly enjoyable listen, despite its brevity", showcasing Matuê's "active involvement in production alongside WIU and Brandão85". Cavalcante praised the standout track "Última Dança" as "a true masterpiece" with "impeccable production, introspective lyrics, and captivating melodies", lauding its "emotional delivery and sophisticated arrangements" for creating "a profound and memorable auditory experience". She highlighted "Honey Babe" as the EP's pinnacle, commending its "sensational innovation" and speculating that it signals "new musical directions" for Matuê's upcoming independent album, 333.

== Track listing ==
No.	Title	Writer(s)	Producer(s)	Length
1.	"A Última Dança"	Matuê	Matuê	3:31
2.	"Honey Babe"	Matuê, Brandão85	Matuê, Brandão85	2:56
3.	"Reza do Milhão"	Matuê, WIU	Matuê, WIU	3:04
Total length:				9:32
