= Hot e Oreia =

Brazilian rap duo

- Origin: Minas Gerais, Brazil
- Genres: Hip Hop
- Years active: 2013–2021
- Past members: Mario Apocalypse do Nascimento (Hot); Gustavo Rafael Aguiar (Oreia)

Hot e Oreia was a Brazilian rap duo made up of Mario Apocalypse "Hot" do Nascimento and Gustavo Rafael "Oreia" Aguiar, both from the state of Minas Gerais. They were strongly associated with producer Coyote Beatz, with whom they recorded much of their music, as well as with rap supergroup DV tribo. They were nominated for the "Clipão da P#rr@" award at the 2020 MTV MIAW Awards Brazil. The duo ended in January 2021 after Hot was accused of assault and abuse against his ex-girlfriend.

== History ==
As students from Sarau Vira-Lata, a travelling project that engages artists in Belo Horizonte with poetry, and Duelo de MCs, Nascimento and Aguiar were major figures in the regional rap scene for five years. Their music utilized electronic beats and the fluid vocals of the two rappers. Hot e Oreia were known for the way they constructed the structure of their songs, with a style that used theatrics with a tone that mixed tragedy and comedy, with changes in tone and increasingly intense freestyles alongside the melodic rhymes. With a concise and satiric style, the duo became well known in the larger Brazilian rap scene.

In 2019, they released their first album, Rap de massagem, which gained them partnerships with famous names such as Luedji Luna e Djonga, along with the singers Luiz Gabriel Lopes and Marina Sena, of the band Rosa Neon. The song “Eu Vou”, a partnership with Djonga, won the Best National Music Video at the Music Video Festival, accomplished with national and international collaborators. Directed by Belle de Melo and Vitor Soares, they were awarded the prize by popular vote. The premise of the video was inspired by the Ariano Suassuna book Auto da Compadecida. In that year as well, they were considered as one of the "10 Brazilian Rappers You Need to Know" by the English online music magazine Highsnobiety.

Hot e Oreia disbanded in January 2021 after Hot was accused of assaulting and abusing his ex-girlfriend. After a long hiatus, Oreia began a solo career with the song Pepinas in March 2022.

== Discography ==
=== Albums ===
- 2019 – Rap de Massagem
- 2019 – Hot e Oreia no Estúdio Showlivre (Ao Vivo)
- 2020 – Crianças Selvagens

=== Singles and EPs ===
- 2018 – "Pegasus"
- 2018 – "Relação"
- 2018 – "Vênus de Mina"
- 2018 – "Polén" (with Froid)
- 2018 – "Nudez"
- 2018 – "Foda"
- 2018 – "Din Din"
- 2019 – "Hino, Pt. 2"
- 2019 – "Eu Vou" (with Djonga)
- 2019 – "Estilo"
- 2019 – "Autoridade" (with MC Caveirinha and Coyote Beatz)
- 2019 – "Onerpm Showcase (Ao Vivo)"
- 2020 – "Piou" (with Rosa Neon)

=== Music videos ===
- 2019 – "Eu Vou" (feat. Djonga)
- 2019 – "Cigarro"
- 2020 – "Papaia" (feat. Black Alien)

== Awards and nominations ==
Year	Award	Category	Nomination	Result	Ref.
2020	MTV Millennial Awards Brasil	Clipão da P#rr@	"Eu Vou"	Nominated	
