= Gorduratrans =

Brazilian shoegaze duo

- Origin: Rio de Janeiro, Brazil
- Genres: Shoegaze; noise rock; noise pop
- Years active: 2015–present
- Labels: Bichano; Balaclava
- Members: Felipe Aguiar; Luiz Felipe Marinho

Gorduratrans is a Brazilian shoegaze duo formed in Rio de Janeiro, in 2015. It consists of Felipe Aguiar (guitar, vocals) and Luiz Felipe Marinho (drums, vocals).

== History ==
In 2015, after a troubled breakup with the band they previously played in together, Felipe Aguiar and Luiz Felipe Marinho decided to form the duo Gorduratrans in Rio de Janeiro. Both had always wanted to experiment with the shoegaze genre. The name Gorduratrans (trans fat) was deliberately chosen to evoke something seen as both villainous and subversive. The band views this choice as a statement against musical clichés, representing a "necessary good" and a symbol of hope that refuses to conform. According to the duo, the name embodies the essence of youth: a refusal to submit to imposed structures.

In the same year, they released their first extended play (EP), Repertório Infindável de Dolorosas Piadas, after working on it for two months. The name was taken from a line in the song "Nas Suas Palavras" (2006), by Ludovic. Following the album's success, they went on an extensive tour across the Northeast Region of Brazil. The album's Spotify streams were enough to generate profit that covered the recording costs of their debut studio album Paroxismos, released on 28 June 2017 with a single in advance released on 14 June, "7 Segundos". Part of the album was recorded at home, and another part at the Cosmoplano Records studio. Except for the vocals, the album was recorded entirely in-studio, with home mixing and mastering, preserving the band's do-it-yourself (DIY) ethos.

The duo toured Brazil to promote the album. Still in the same year, in July, a teaser for the visual album of Paroxismos was released, and it was launched at a performance on October 28. After a five-year hiatus, the band released "Enterro dos Ossos" in April 2022, along with a music video. On June 2, the second single, "Nem Sempre Foi Assim", was released. The album was released on the 15th.

== Artistry ==
Gorduratrans' musical style has been described as shoegaze, noise rock, and noise pop, featuring loud "distorted guitars" reminiscent of the sound of bands like My Bloody Valentine, Slowdive, The Jesus and Mary Chain and Ride. The band is also noted for its distinct lo-fi style. Their debut album, Repertório Infindável de Dolorosas Piadas, was widely acclaimed by Brazilian music publications as one of the year's best releases. Spanning 21 minutes, the record blends sentimental themes with precise melodies, featuring layered guitar pedal loops that produce a "fat and open" sound, contrasted by clean, melancholic vocals. The website Tenho Mais Discos Que Amigos! included the band in its list of "8 Brazilian bands that do it beautiful in shoegaze" and stated that Paroxismos "brings more sonic maturity and increasingly flirts with noise, blending the shoegaze wall of sound with personal lyrics". Described as a shoegaze, noise, and post-emo record by Monkeybuzz, the album "shows the strength of new rock", according to Estadão, and was considered by multiple journalists denser than their previous EP. Gorduratrans has also been associated with the rock triste scene, a movement within Brazilian independent music.

== Members ==
- Felipe Aguiar – guitar, vocals
- Luiz Felipe Marinho – drums, vocals

== Discography ==
=== Studio albums ===
- Paroxismos (2017)
- Zera (2022)

=== EPs ===
- Repertório Infindável de Dolorosas Piadas (2015)

=== Singles ===
- "7 Segundos" (2017)
- "Enterro dos Ossos" (2022)
- "Nem Sempre Foi Assim" (2022)
