= DV tribo =

Rap supergroup

DV TRIBO
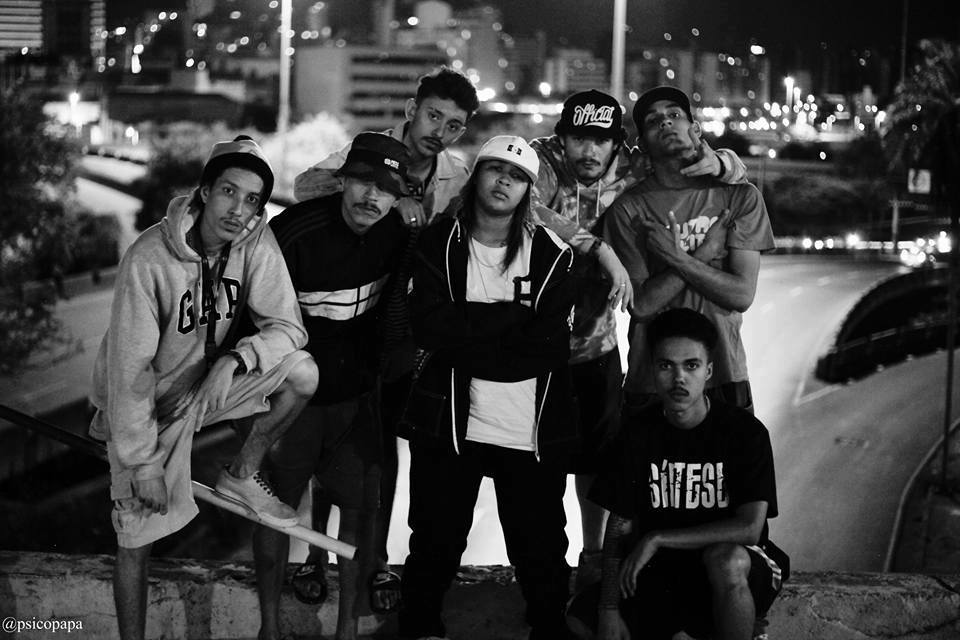
- DV TRIBO in 2023

Background information
- Origin: Belo Horizonte, Minas Gerais, Brazil
- Genres: Hip Hop
- Years active: 2015–2018, 2022–present
- Past members: Djonga; Hot e Oreia; Clara Lima; FBC; Coyote Beatz

DV tribo (stylized as DV TRIBO) is a rap supergroup formed Belo Horizonte, Brazil. Initially active from 2015 to 2018, they are considered one of the foremost exponents of the Golden Era of the Belo Horizonte rap scene. They are well known for their sharp societal criticism in their lyrics, which was a characteristic of all their members. Their most famous member is the rapper Djonga, who became famous after his productions with DV TRIBO and Coyote Beatz.

== History ==
The supergroup was created in 2015 as a product of the rising rap collectives in Belo Horizonte, best exemplified by the Duelo de MCs, which was a huge hit in the city. Many of the collective's members came from poorer communities in the north and east of the city. Many of DV TRIBO's members were close friends prior to forming the group. They released their first single, Geração Elevada, in 2016.

On 3 April 2018, DV TRIBO released a statement on social media that they would be taking an indefinite hiatus. On 25 September 2022, however, all of the original members, save for Hot of Hot e Oreia, gave a show in Belo Horizonte, signaling a possible return of the group.

== Members ==
- Djonga
- FBC
- Coyote Beatz
- Clara Lima
- Hot e Oreia
