= Terno Rei =

Brazilian alternative rock band

- Origin: São Paulo, Brazil
- Genres: Alternative rock; indie rock
- Years active: 2010–present
- Label: Balaclava
- Members: Ale Sater; Bruno Paschoal; Greg Maya; Luis Cardoso
- Past members: Victor Souza

Terno Rei is a Brazilian alternative rock band formed in São Paulo, in 2010. It consists of Ale Sater (vocals, bass), Bruno Paschoal (guitar, vocals, synthesizers), Greg Maya (guitars, synthesizers), and Luis Cardoso (drums, vocals).

== History ==
Terno Rei was formed in 2010 in the city of São Paulo. Its members already knew each other from other bands and as friends before forming the band. Their debut album, Vigilia, was released in 2014 and featured influences from shoegaze, space rock, and dream pop. The album was noted for its melancholic tone and ambient textures, drawing comparisons to acts like Slowdive and Warpaint. Over time, after their first album, the band grew to know each other even better and became very close friends. Despite positive critical reception, the album did not generate widespread commercial attention.

In 2015, the band released the EP Trem Leva Minhas Pernas, recorded as part of the Converse Rubber Tracks initiative. The EP, which consisted of two tracks composed in just two rehearsals, marked a turning point for the band's exposure. That same year, Terno Rei was selected to perform at the Primavera Sound festival in Barcelona and participated in a promotional campaign for Peugeot that included a Facebook video which garnered over 10 million views.

Terno Rei's second studio album, Essa Noite Bateu Com Um Sonho, was released in 2016. It marked a stylistic shift toward more subdued arrangements and introspective songwriting, incorporating elements of dream pop, psychedelic music, and shoegaze. The album further developed the band's signature themes of urban melancholy and emotional introspection, rooted in the daily life of São Paulo.

Released in 2019, Violeta marked a turning point for the group, receiving widespread acclaim. The album showcased a shift toward pop-oriented arrangements with synth-pop, dream pop, and post-punk influences. Themes included love, solitude, and metropolitan life in São Paulo. Despite its introspective core, the album was perceived as more uplifting than its predecessors. Production was handled by Gustavo Schirmer and Amadeus De Marchi, with mixing and mastering by Vinícius "Nico" Braganholo. Sessions were intensive and involved the full band in all aspects of the process. Its release was postponed due to political instability in Brazil in late 2018.

The COVID-19 pandemic affected the band's touring schedule, including the cancellation of the Lollapalooza Brazil festival in 2020. They later performed at the rescheduled edition of the festival in March 2022. Their fourth album, Gêmeos (2022), was composed between August 2020 and July 2021 and explored themes of friendship and duality. The album incorporated elements of 2000s pop, synth-pop, and orchestral arrangements. Their fifth album, Nenhuma Estrela (2025), has been described by Tenho Mais Discos Que Amigos! as their most "ambitious" and "mature" release. Produced by Gustavo Schirmer and mixed by Nicolas Vernhes, the album features guest appearances by Lô Borges and Clara Borges.

== Members ==
Current members

- Ale Sater – vocals, bass
- Bruno Paschoal – guitar, vocals, synthesizers
- Greg Maya – guitars, synthesizers
- Luis Cardoso – drums, vocals

== Discography ==
=== Studio albums ===
- Vigília (2014)
- Essa Noite Bateu Com Um Sonho (2016)
- Violeta (2019)
- Gêmeos (2022)
- Nenhuma Estrela (2025)

=== EPs ===
- Metrópole (2012)
- Trem Leva Minhas Pernas (2015)
- Acústico (2020)
- Conexão Balaclava: Samuel Rosa e Terno Rei (2021)
- Gêmeos Live Session (2022)
- B-Sides Gêmeos (2023)
