= Effi Wizen =

Israeli animator

- אפי ויזן
- Born: Efraim Wizen; October 29, 1956 (age 70)
- Occupations: computer animator and visual effects specialist

Efraim "Effi" Wizen (Hebrew: אפרים "אפי" ויזן; born October 29, 1956, in Israel) is an Israeli computer animator and visual effects specialist.

== Biography ==
Wizen graduated from ORT Israel, having studied architecture. He also earned a B.Sc. in architecture and city planning from the Technion – Israel Institute of Technology. He is one of the first specialists in computer animation and visual effects, founding the first 3D animation company in Israel, “Dad_Pro”, in 1984.

In 1987, Wizen created one of the first film digital compositing systems, called Toccata. Wizen used the system in one of the first digitally composed movie Taxandria in 1989 and Neverending Story III in 1994. He worked on both films as Digital Effects Supervisor. Also in 1994 he founded the post production house "Gravity VFX and Design", serving six years as the co-CEO. He then opened Gravity VFX in Canada, aligning with "RhinoFX", and now known as "Gravity". In 1998, Wizen created the consortium that was composed of Digital Domain, Kushner-Locke Company, Capitol Films of the United Kingdom, Israeli Financial Banking firm DLIN Ltd., and Israeli post-production facility Gravity VFX and Design (a VFX boutique with offices in Canada and Israel, of which he is CEO and creative director).

In 1997, he handled digital effects for The Dybbuk of the Holy Apple Field. In 2000/2001, he shared the Royal Television Society Craft and Design Award for Visual Effects – Digital nomination for Planet Storm.

In 2010, he was the head of visual effects for São Paulo-based Estudios Quanta, a major regional film industry company. In 2011, he combined with Brazilian producer Roberto d’Avilla and entrepreneur Perival Palesela to acquire Imarion, a Toronto visual effects and animation post-production company.
