= Matuê =

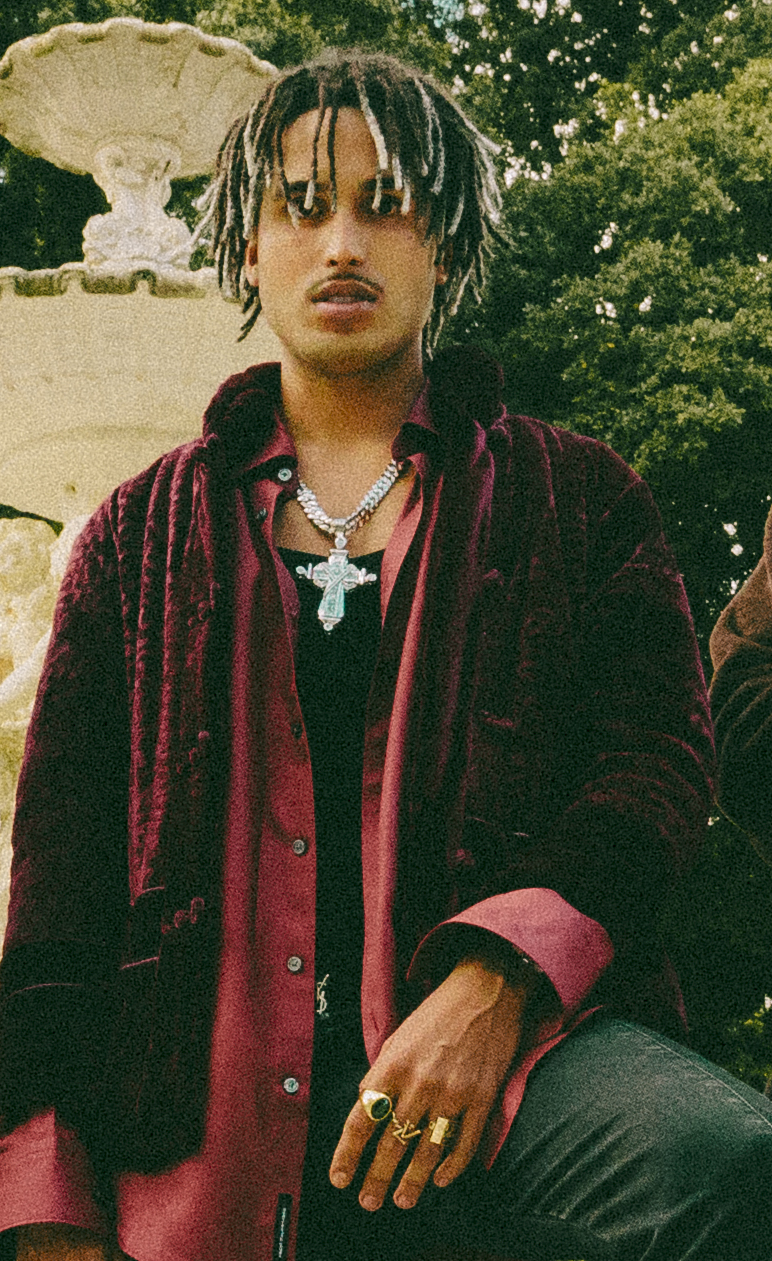
- Matuê in 2021

Background information
- Born: Matheus Brasileiro Aguiar; 11 October 1993 (age 33); Fortaleza, Ceará, Brazil
- Genres: Hip-hop; trap; reggae; psychedelic
- Occupations: Rapper; singer; songwriter
- Instruments: Voice; guitar
- Years active: 2015–present
- Label: 30praum

Matheus Brasileiro Aguiar (born 11 October 1993), better known as Matuê (Brazilian Portuguese pronunciation: [ma.tu'e]), is a Brazilian rapper, singer and songwriter. He is best known for his singles "Anos Luz", released in 2017, his 2020 album Máquina do Tempo, and the 2023 hit "Conexões de Máfia", a collaboration with Rich the Kid. He is considered one of the biggest names in the Brazilian trap scene.

== Biography ==
Matuê was born in Fortaleza, the capital of Ceará state. At 8 years old, his family moved to the United States, in particular to Oakland, California. He lived there until he was 11, returning to Brazil in 2004. As a result of him living in the United States, he is fluent in English. Studying in public schools, he began to have contact with and take interest in the world of rap, but began to fall on hard times during his adolescence after the death of his grandmother, who had always supported him. He began to work at a clothing shop in a mall. After a while, taking advantage of his fluency in English, he became an English tutor. He began to save money from his English tutoring and invest it into his musical career.

"It was a very big privilege. It opened many doors for me and gave me the possibility to take initiative in my musical path. The other point is that I saw the importance of rap there in the USA and I saw that I could do this here."

— Matuê

Together with Clara Mendes and Lucas Degas, Matuê founded the recording and production studio 30praum in 2016.

On 27 September 2021 Matuê revealed that he became a father during the COVID-19 pandemic without giving much detail.

== Musical career ==
Matuê began his musical career in 2015, releasing his first reggae mixtape, titled Reggae, produced by 30praum. However, the mixtape was not successful and he decided to move into the trap genre. In 2016, he became known nationally for his first trap recording, "RBN", with a music video with what was considered a unique aesthetic and much musical originality. His vocal harmony came to be his defining characteristic. He has cited Anitta as an influence.

Since then, he has been the creative director of 30praum and has innovated with each new release, introducing new sounds and productions. His work always presents a variety of flows and harmonies, making each song different without losing their originality and quality. Matuê has 7.9 million monthly listeners on Spotify, with his album Máquina do Tempo having more than 110 million views on YouTube in a week. His main hit of 2019, "Kenny G", has more than 245 million views.

On 10 September 2020, Matuê launched his first album, Máquina do Tempo, with six tracks for a total album time of 19:32. He impressed many with his works on the titular song "Máquina do Tempo", which was the most anticipated by fans. A bonus track, "A+", was included with the album. The launch of Máquina do Tempo broke streaming records on Spotify Brasil, totaling 4.6 million replays on the platform in the first 24 hours, and became the first rap album with five songs with more than 100 million plays.

In 2022, Matuê performed at Lollapalooza Brazil at the Interlagos Circuit in São Paulo. In 2023, his collaboration with Rich the Kid, "Conexões de Máfia", topped the Brazilian charts and was nominated for the 2023 Multishow Brazilian Music Award for both Music Video of the Year and Hip Hop Song of the Year.

== Discography ==
=== Studio albums ===
- Máquina do Tempo (2020)
- 333 (2024)
- Xtranho (2025)

EPs

- Sabor Overdose no Yakisoba (2024)

=== Singles ===
- 2016: "RBN"
- 2017: "100 Placas"
- 2017: "De Alta"
- 2017: "Celine"
- 2017: "Lama no Copo"
- 2017: "H.O.R.T.A"
- 2017: "Anos Luz"
- 2018: "De Peça em Peça"
- 2018: "Outro Plano"
- 2018: "Urubus (feat Derek)"
- 2018: "Quem Manda é a 30"
- 2018: "3am (feat Luccas Carlos)"
- 2018: "A Morte do Autotune"
- 2019: "Banco"
- 2019: "Kenny G"
- 2019: "Mantém (feat WIU)"
- 2019: "Quem Mandou Chamar"
- 2021: "M4 (feat Teto)"
- 2021: "Quer Voar"
- 2021: "Groupies (feat Teto, Doode)"
- 2021: "Sem Dó (feat L7nnon)"
- 2022: "Vampiro (feat Teto, WIU)"
- 2023: "Flow Espacial (feat Teto, WIU)"
- 2023: "Conexões de Máfia (feat Rich the Kid)"
- 2024: "Filho da Noite (feat MC Ryan SP)"

== Awards and nominations ==
Year	Prize	Category	Nomination	Result	Ref.
2019	MTV MIAW Awards Brazil	#PRESTATENÇÃONOGÁS	Himself	Nominated	
2020	MTV MIAW Awards Brazil	Beat BR	Himself	Nominated	
2021	MTV MIAW Awards Brazil	Trap na Cena	Himself	Nominated	
2022	MTV MIAW Awards Brazil	Trap na Cena	Himself	Nominated	
2022	MTV MIAW Awards Brazil	Musical Artist	Himself	Nominated	
2022	MTV MIAW Awards Brazil	Trap na Cena	Himself	Nominated	
2022	MTV MIAW Awards Brazil	Anthem of the Year	"VAMPiro" (with Teto and WIU)	Nominated	
2022	MTV MIAW Awards Brazil	Feat. Nacional	"VAMPiro" (with Teto and WIU)	Nominated	
2022	Prêmio iBest	Ceará Influencer	Himself	TOP3	
2023	2023 MTV Europe Music Awards	Best Brazilian Artist	Himself	Won	
2023	2023 Multishow Brazilian Music Award	Music Video of the Year	"Conexões de Máfia" (with Rich the Kid)	Nominated	
2023	2023 Multishow Brazilian Music Award	Hip Hop of the year	"Conexões de Máfia" (with Rich the Kid)	Nominated	
2024	2024 Multishow Brazilian Music Award	Artist of the Year and Album of the Year	himself, 333	Nominated	
