= Coyote Beatz =

Brazilian musical artist

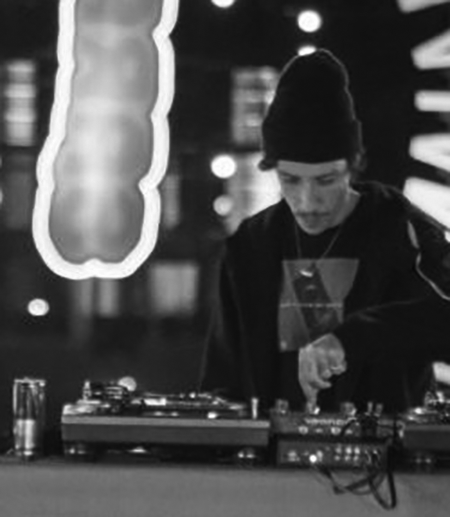
- Coyote playing at a show in Brazil.

Background information
- Born: Paulo Alexandre Almeida Santos
- Origin: Belo Horizonte, MG, Brazil
- Genre: Hip hop
- Occupation: Hip hop producer
- Years active: 2013–present
- Label: Macaco Lab

Paulo Alexandre Almeida Santos, better known by his stage name Coyote Beatz or simply Coyote, is a Brazilian hip hop producer, DJ, and member of the underground hip hop group DV tribo. Coyote is known for his work with Brazilian rapper Djonga, although he has worked with various artists, including Emicida, Rashid, Fenda, FBC, among others.

== Career ==
In 2013, Coyote Beatz and Djonga worked together for the first time. Gradually, the Brazilian music producer began to gather recognition in the Hip Hop scene with his diverse boom bap and trap instrumentals. During this period, Coyote also presented his beats at local events in Belo Horizonte, mainly organized by the Família de Rua collective at the Duelo de MCs. Some notable work from Coyote can be encountered in Djonga's album Histórias da Minha Área.

Coyote also produced Emicida's single Papel, Caneta e Coração, which was well received in Brazil and aided the music producer in obtaining some initial notoriety.

Recently, Coyote Beatz released the album BE$T $ELLER OF DJONGA, which compiles the most well known instrumentals produced by the beatmaker that were utilized in Djonga's music.

By using classic Rock and Samba references, Coyote Beatz also creates compositions influenced by experimental electronic music and obscure soundtracks.

In 2018, Coyote won the Prêmio Genius Brasil de Música award for best producer.

== Production credits ==
=== with Djonga ===
Album information
Heresia
- Released: 2017
- Label: Macaco Lab
O Menino Queria Ser Deus
- Released: 2018
- Label: Macaco Lab
Ladrão
- Released: 2019
- Label: Macaco Lab
Histórias da Minha Área
- Released: 2020
- Label: Macaco Lab

=== Instrumental albums ===
Album information
BE$T $ELLER OF DJONGA
- Released: 2020
- Label: Macaco Lab

=== Video clips ===
- 2018 – A Música da Mãe (with Djonga)

== Awards ==
- Prêmio Genius Brasil de Música Brasileira 2018 (winner for best producer)
