= Adorável Clichê =

Brazilian shoegaze band

- Origin: Blumenau, Santa Catarina, Brazil
- Genres: Shoegaze; dream pop
- Years active: 2013–present
- Members: Gabrielle Philippi; Marlon Lopes da Silva; Lucas Toledo Lugones; Felipe Protski
- Past members: Diogo Leal

Adorável Clichê is a Brazilian shoegaze band formed in 2013 in Blumenau, Santa Catarina.

== History ==
=== 2013–2017: Formation and early years ===
Adorável Clichê was founded in 2013 by a group of teenage musicians in Blumenau, Santa Catarina, including Gabrielle Philippi (vocals, guitars), Marlon Lopes da Silva (vocals, guitars, production), Lucas Toledo Lugones (vocals, bass), and Diogo Leal (drums). Initially performing cover songs, the band's name originated from Philippi's self-characterization of her early compositions as emotionally charged and "cheesy", or clichéd, but nonetheless "adorable"—a reflection of her resistance to the prevailing rock culture in their hometown that favored a more abrasive sound.

In their early years, they released a three-track demo titled Demo II in 2015, featuring original compositions. Drawing from a diverse range of influences, including Cartola, Coldplay, and Gotye, the group sought to create music free from strict genre classifications. Their sound combined delicate and dynamic vocals with melodic instrumentation, leaning toward an infectious style of indie rock with simple, emotionally direct lyrics. Their first studio release, the extended play (EP) São Tantos Anos Sem Dizer, appeared in 2016, serving as a creative precursor to their debut album. The EP explored themes of emotional repression and adolescent introspection, laying the groundwork for the band's lyrical and sonic identity.

=== 2018–2019: O Que Existe Dentro de Mim ===
Adorável Clichê released their debut album, O Que Existe Dentro de Mim, on 31 August 2018 through Nuzzy Records. The album dealt with themes such as psychological turbulence, youth disillusionment, and the transitional period into adulthood. Tracks such as "Traços" and "Crescer" exemplified the album's sonic duality, blending dream pop textures with aggressive, distorted riffs. Other highlights included "Compressa", regarded as an anthem of adolescence, the instrumental "Naquele Inverno", and the energetic "Sobre Cair De Bicicleta". Monkeybuzz reviewer Lucas Cassoli drew comparisons to artists such as Snail Mail, Soccer Mommy, and Angel Olsen. The album's artwork features a photo of Philippi, taken by her mother, during her childhood, before going to school on a winter morning. Selected after months of indecision, featured a photo taken from Lopes' apartment balcony and echoed the album's intimate and introspective nature.

The album was recorded independently in Lopes' home studio using minimal equipment, including a basic audio interface and a laptop. Lopes oversaw production and mixing, with mastering by Guilherme Chiappetta. The recording process spanned approximately a year and a half and faced technical setbacks, including data loss due to equipment failure. The album was met with generally positive reviews from critics, with an 8.0/10 rating from Monkeybuzz, an 8.6/10 from Música Instantânea and 8.0/10 stars from O Grito!. Multiple journalists praised the album for its emotional candor and stylistic fusion of shoegaze, indie rock, and post-rock. It was featured in two end-of-year lists; it ranked 14th among "The 50 Best Brazilian Albums of 2018" by Música Instantânea and 12th in Hits Perdidos' corresponding selection.

=== 2020–2023: Subsequent singles and lineup changes ===
Following their debut, Adorável Clichê continued to produce new songs, releasing seven singles between 2020 and 2023, including "Cadência", "Papel de Trouxa", "Gelo Fino", and "Mar Aberto". These works marked a period of experimentation, especially with synthesizer-driven sounds. The single "Derrota" (2020) featured a more pop-oriented production while maintaining the band's characteristic introspection. "Papel de Trouxa", released in 2022, incorporated 1980s-inspired synth textures and addressed themes of emotional dependency.

During this period, drummer Diogo Leal departed the group in 2020, prompting a shift in the band's creative process. Songwriting increasingly took place in studio settings rather than through live rehearsals, with members learning to perform tracks after the fact. That same year, Felipe Protski (guitars), who had contributed during the production of the debut album, joined the official lineup, bringing additional synthesizer and production capabilities.

=== 2024–present: Sonhos Que Nunca Morrem ===
On 9 July 2024, the band released its second studio album, Sonhos Que Nunca Morrem, featuring nine tracks. Preceded by the singles "Aonde Mais", "Amarga", and "Um Sorriso Que Se Vai", the album explores themes of memory, melancholy, and perseverance. "Amarga" was noted for its urgency and expressive vocals, while "Um Sorriso Que Se Vai" acted as a lyrical farewell letter centered on self-worth and personal growth. Musically, the album retained the band's blend of shoegaze, dream pop, and alternative rock, while incorporating a more serene and cohesive sonic atmosphere. The guitar work was intentionally refined, and synthesizers—heavily influenced by Beach House—provided connective sonic textures across tracks.

Like their previous work, the album was recorded in a home studio environment and produced by Lopes. The album was met positively, receiving ratings of 8.6/10 from Música Instantânea, 8.5/10 from Pop Fantasma, and 3.5/5 from O Grito!, with Cleber Facchi of Musica Instantânea highlighting the band's growing sonic maturity and emotional resonance. In January 2025, Sonhos Que Nunca Morrem was included in the São Paulo Art Critics Association list of the 50 best Brazilian albums of 2024, which was listened to twelve music critics.

== Members ==
=== Current members ===
- Gabrielle Philippi – vocals, guitars (2013–present)
- Marlon Lopes da Silva – vocals, guitars (2013–present)
- Lucas Toledo Lugones – vocals, bass (2013–present)
- Felipe Protski – guitars (2020–present)

=== Former members ===
- Diogo Leal – drums (2013–2020)

== Discography ==
=== Studio albums ===
- O Que Existe Dentro de Mim (2018)
- Sonhos Que Nunca Morrem (2024)

=== EPs ===
- Demo II (2015)
- São Tantos Anos Sem Dizer (2016)
