= 30praum =

Brazilian independent record label

- Founded: 2016; 9 years ago
- Founder: Matuê, Clara Mendes, Lucas Degas
- Status: Active
- Distributor(s): Independent (2016–2019, 2024–present); Sony Music Brazil (2019–2024)
- Genre: Hip-hop; trap
- Location: Fortaleza, Ceará, Brazil
- Official website: 30praum.store

30praum (stylized in upper case) is a Brazilian independent record label founded by rapper Matuê and co-founded by businesswoman Clara Mendes and director Lucas Degas. Established in 2016 and based in Fortaleza, the label seeks to contribute to the diversification of the Brazilian hip-hop industry from the Northeast region of Brazil. The origin of the name comes from the rapper's desire to buy cannabis for R$30 individually for each one (hence the term Praum, a Portuguese contraction of 'para um', lit. 'for one'), associating the perceived quality of the product with the quality of his music.

== History ==
Co-founder Clara Mendes, born in Berlin, Germany, studied business administration before moving to Fortaleza on an exchange program, during which she learned Portuguese. Mendes, the daughter of a Portuguese mother and a German father, met Matuê and started dating. After a period in Germany, where Matuê taught English to the Chinese, they both decided to return to Brazil in 2015 to dedicate themselves to music. In 2022, the couple separated. Despite the end of the relationship, they remained firm in their business partnership.

Initially a regional production house, 30praum was established in 2016 to support artists from the Northeast region of Brazil, expanding the region's Brazilian hip-hop industry, aiming to address the concentration of the national hip-hop industry in the South and Southeast regions, particularly in Rio de Janeiro and São Paulo. Early on, the label signed other northeastern artists, such as Matuê himself and collaborations with Teto, Brandão, and Wiu, who later gained recognition in the national rap scene. Lucas Degas, 30praum's co-founder, who held the title of set director, cinematographer, and creative director, resigned the label in October 2018.

In 2019, Matuê has signed a distribution agreement with Sony Music Brazil. Subsequently, in August 2024, 30praum ended its agreement with the distributor, releasing the extended play diss Sabor Overdose no Yakisoba as a strategic move to fulfill contractual obligations and gain greater autonomy in managing royalties and artistic direction. Thereafter, his next album 333 was released independently under 30praum. The label has also participated in events such as the Plantão Festival, the first trap festival in Fortaleza, focusing on presenting Northeast rap and collaboration with artists from other regions. Other festivals include the 2024 Rock in Rio, Brasília, and the Festa Junina de Votorantim, São Paulo, featuring Teto and Wiu.
