= Djonga =

Brazilian rapper (born 1994)

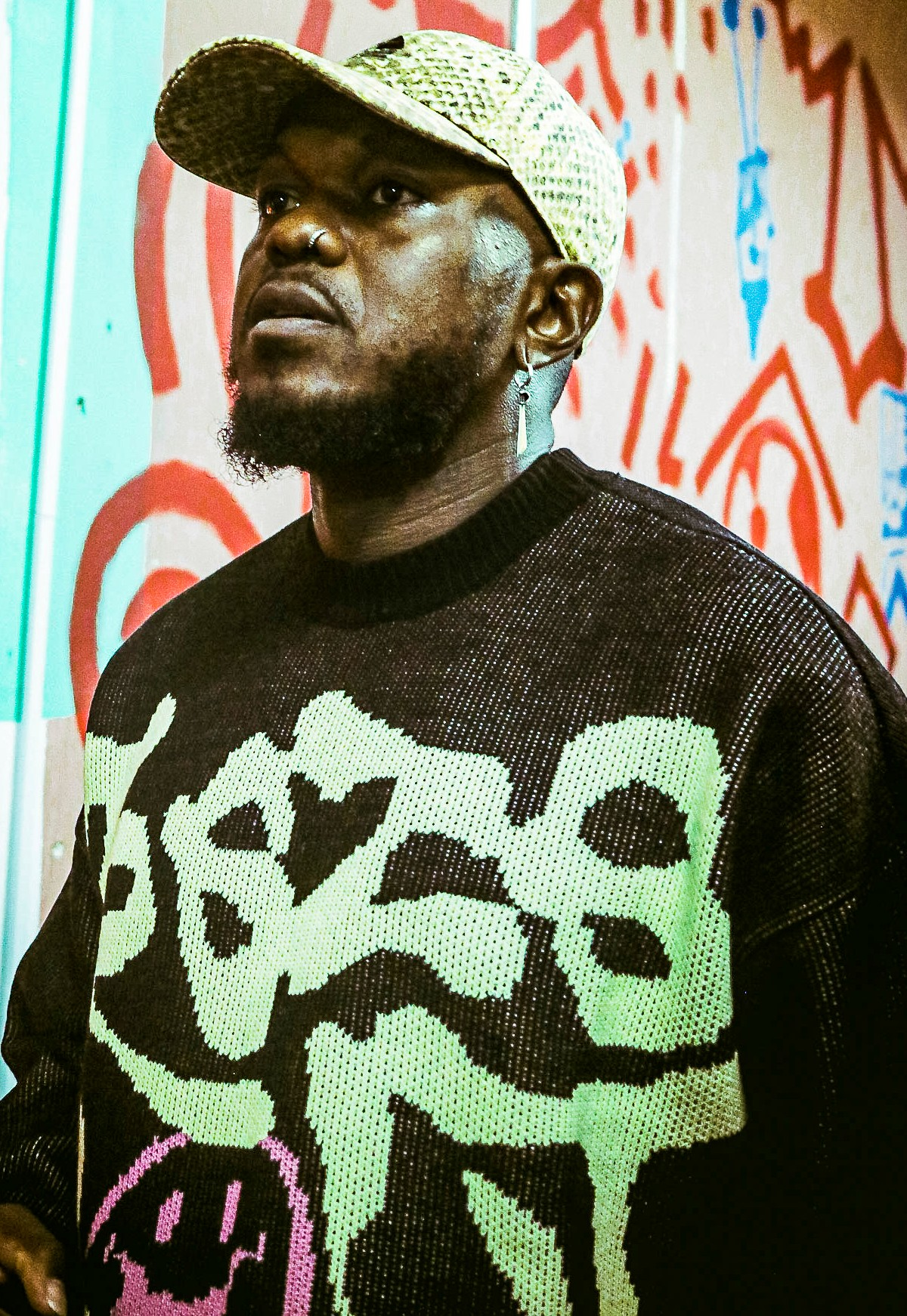
- Djonga in 2022

Background information
- Born: Gustavo Pereira Marques; June 4, 1994 (age 32); Belo Horizonte, Minas Gerais, Brazil
- Genres: Hip hop; trap; urbano; world
- Occupations: Rapper; singer; songwriter; poet
- Instrument: vocals
- Years active: 2010–present
- Label: Ceia Ent.

Gustavo Pereira Marques (Brazilian Portuguese: [ɡusˈtavu peˈɾe(j)ɾɐ ˈmaʁkis]; born 4 June 1994), better known by his artistic name Djonga (pronounced [ˈdʒõɡɐ]), is a Brazilian rapper, singer and songwriter. Considered one of the most influential names currently on the Brazilian rap scene, the artist has attracted attention for his direct and strongly worded lyrics with strong social criticisms. He frequently collaborates with producer Coyote Beatz.

== Biography ==
Born in the favela of Favela do Índio, in the city of Belo Horizonte, Djonga was raised in the São Lucas and Santa Efigênia neighborhoods in the eastern region of the city. He is the son of Ronaldo Marques and Rosângela Pereira Marques. His grandmother Maria Eni Viana has been a great source of inspiration throughout his life.

With a great deal of inspiration coming from his family, Djonga had taken a likening to music since his youth, having been raised on diverse musical genres and artists, from Milton Nascimento to Racionais MCs, and from Cartola to Mariah Carey. Djonga has asserted that he is strongly influenced by funk and samba. He has recalled that "Black culture is strong in my family, and so samba was always present at parties...When I became more conscious of what I really liked in relation to music, what I most identified with because of my generation was Brazilian funk. Funk always spoke my experiences to me."

With time, he was taking to his musical inclinations, mainly for funk and rap. He only became more exposed to rap after his ex-girlfriend introduced him to the genre more. He was at the same time also being inspired by the works of Cazuza, Janis Joplin, Elis Regina, Elza Soares, Jimi Hendrix, MC Smith, Marcelo D2 and, above all, Mano Brown. He studied history at the Federal University of Ouro Preto, but he decided to leave the university before graduation as his rap career began to take off.

Djonga has participated in protests against racist violence towards Black people, participating in protests in Belo Horizonte after the killing of João Alberto Freitas at a Carrefour store in Porto Alegre in 2020. During the protests, he helped to occupy a local Carrefour store. During the 2022 presidential elections, he voiced his support for and posed for photos with former president Luiz Inácio Lula da Silva, who ran and won against incumbent president Jair Bolsonaro.

== Career ==
=== 2012–2016: Beginnings and Corpo Fechado ===
He began his career in a poetry collective called Sarau Vira-Lata. In the beginning, as he was graduating from secondary school in 2012, he frequented collectives to listen to poetry. He began to be interested in writing poetry as a result. Following such, the rapper Hot Apocalypse invited him to join a group. He also began to visit the studio of Chuck, also known as Oculto Beats, who produced a beat that Djonga made music to with a poem that he had written previously. This eventually became his first single, "Corpo Fechado".

After collaborating with Coyote Beatz for a time, they produced the EP “Fechando o Corpo” with 7 tracks. Coyote Beatz would later become a frequent collaborator with Djonga. He began to become more well known after the release of the EP, with him receiving a proposal from DJ Hum to record. Together they made the track "Um Bom Maluco". With the release of the track, Djonga quickly began to make strides in the new rap scene.

In 2016, Djonga and Hot created DV tribo and gathered other artists from Minas Gerais such as FBC, Clara Lima, Oreia (who formed Hot e Oreia with Hot) and Coyote Beatz to participate. The group gained notoriety after making a chord with the underground rap label Pirâmide Perdida. That same year, Bahian rapper Baco Exu do Blues invited Djonga to participate in the track “Sujismundo”. Later, the single "Redenção", released with the rapper Primata, he began to make new partnerships, such as with his participation in the song “Santana 89” by the stoner rock band Arqueologia Siderúrgica. At the end of 2016, he participated in Poetas no Topo 1 by Pineapple Storm TV, that reunited prominent MCs such as BK, Makalister, Menestrel and Sant.

=== 2017–2018: Heresia and O Menino que queria ser Deus ===
On 13 March 2017, Djonga launched his debut album "Heresia" to critical and public acclaim. In the album he makes strong criticisms against society at large and sends messages emphasizing Black empowerment. The album was considered best of the year by Rolling Stone Brasil. The highlighted track, “O mundo é nosso”, made with the participation of Rio de Janeiro rapper BK, ran to win the Red Bull prize for best track of 2017, reaching 7th place. For his notable work, Djonga was also nominated for the APCA (Associação Paulista de Críticos de Arte) prize.

On the same day, on 13 March 2018, Djonga released his second album, titled O Menino queria ser Deus, that contains sharp lyrical questions around his personal life, career, and social and racial issues. The album contains 10 tracks with appearances by rappers such as Sant, Karol Conká and Hot, with executive producers from Ceia Ent., production by Coyote Beatz and mixing and mastersounding by Arthur Luna. The album was primarily recorded at Nebula Records studios. The album was dubbed the 6th best Brazilian album in 2018 by Rolling Stone Brasil and one of the 25 best Brazilian albums in the first half of 2018 by APCA.

=== 2019–2020: Ladrão and Histórias da Minha Área ===
In keeping with his tradition of releasing albums on 13 March, on 13 March 2019, Djonga released the album "Ladrão". The concept, clearly inspired by Robin Hood, points to the importance of valuing ones' roots, and not to forget where you came from; Djonga himself had written on his social media: "the type of thief that seeks and brings back for mine and by mine." "Ladrão" reaffirms the promise of the music from the album to be a reference to one of the largest names in the rap scene of Belo Horizonte, and more than that, to show an artist with ample vision about social issues that surround Brazil, especially as they are related to Black people.

On 13 March 2020, Djonga launched the album "Histórias da Minha Área". In talking about his new album, he mentioned that he discussed some things from his past to his close friends, and also that he was certain that his recount of "his recount" is a microcosm of "areas all throughout Brazil". Later in 2020, on 29 September, Djonga made history as the first Brazilian artist to be nominated for the BET Hip Hop Awards, being nominated during the 2020 award season for Best International Flow. In the same year, he was nominated for best Brazilian act at the 2020 MTV Europe Music Awards.

=== 2020–present: Hiatus and new album releases ===
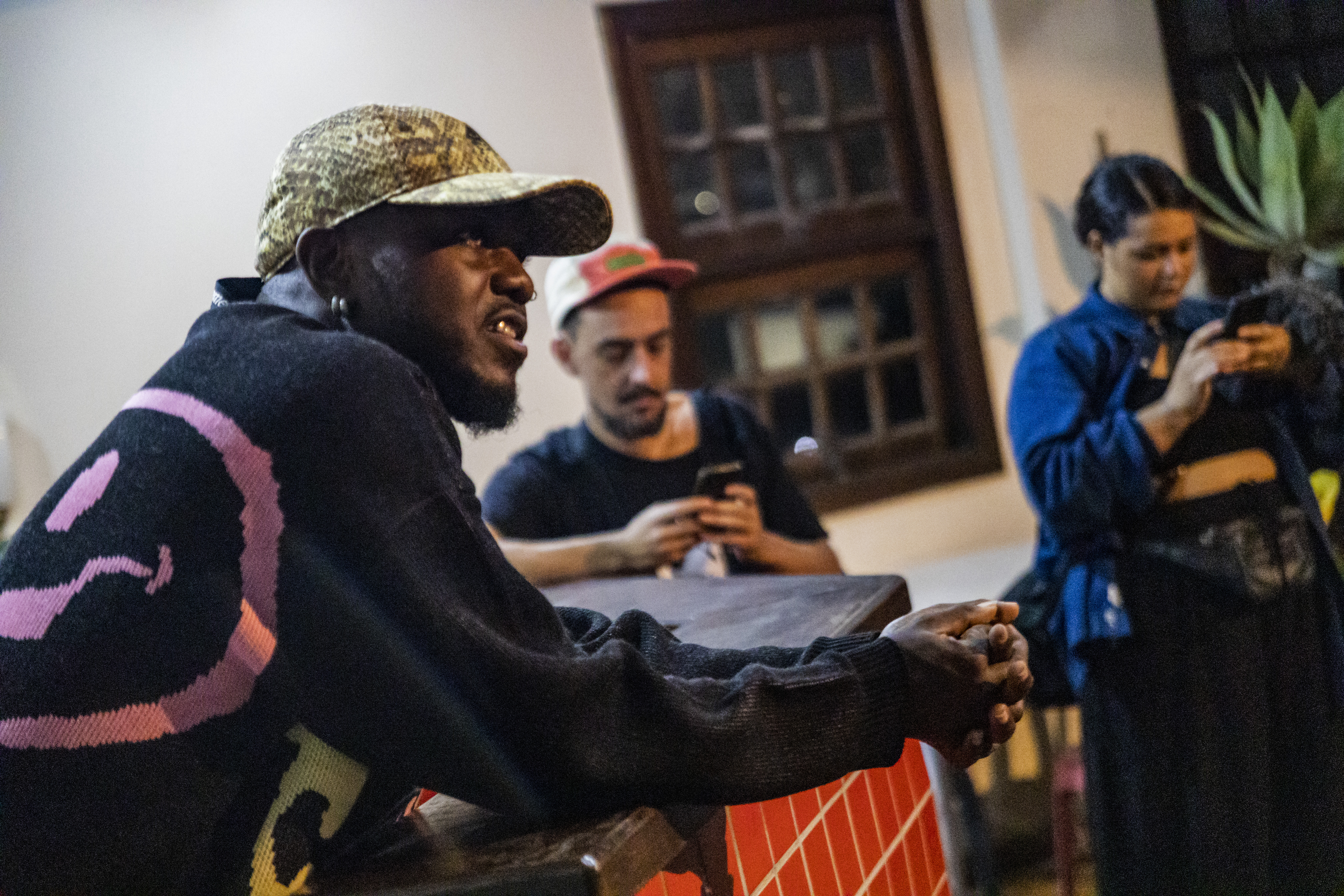
Djonga during the release of his album O Dono do Lugar in São Paulo in 2022

After a controversial show on 7 December 2020 and receiving widespread criticism, Djonga decided to limit posting on his social media, to the extent of deleting his Twitter, only returning on 10 March 2021 to announce his new album NU with a promotional teaster where he posted an image of himself in a guillotine set for him to be decapitated. Once again, on 13 March 2021, he launched his 5th consecutive studio album with 10 unpublished tracks.

On 13 October 2022, he released his newest album, O Dono do Lugar, with 11 unreleased tracks. The album delves into society's oppressive expectations of masculinity, particularly as this relates to Black men, as well as with racism at large, family, and with the music industry. He was nominated again at the 2022 MTV MIAW Awards Brazil in the Beat BR category.

== Controversies ==
=== Show during the COVID-19 pandemic ===
In December 2020, during the height of the COVID-19 pandemic in Rio de Janeiro, Djonga held a performance in the Vila do João neighborhood of the North Zone of Rio. Videos of the rapper performing in front of crowds that were without masks and disregarding the protocols put forth by the World Health Organization circulated online. The performance sparked great backlash against Djonga, given the severity of the pandemic at the time in both Rio de Janeiro the city and the state.

A series of tweets posted by Djonga's account attempted to defend himself against strong criticism. He began receiving a series of threats, as well as offensive and racist messages. Some commentators began to point out racist double standards tied to the ability for other non-Black artists such as Wesley Safadão to host a show with more than 40,000 people in Natal with considerably less backlash.

=== Alleged assault against security ===
On 12 December 2021, Djonga became involved in controversy after allegedly assaulting security during the Copa do Brasil final. He asserted that he had assaulted them due to being the target of racism by said security staff.

== Discography ==
=== EPs ===
Album	Details
Heresia	Released: 13 March 2017; Studio: Ceia; Formats: Digital download, streaming
O Menino que Queria ser Deus	Released: 13 March 2018; Studio: Ceia; Formats: Digital download, streaming
Ladrão	Released: 13 March 2019; Studio: Ceia; Formats: Digital download, streaming
Histórias da Minha Área	Released: 13 March 2020; Studio: Ceia; Formats: Digital download, streaming
NU	Released: 13 March 2021; Studio: Ceia; Formats: Digital download, streaming
O Dono do Lugar	Released: 13 October 2022; Studio: A Quadrilha; Formats: Digital download, streaming

Title	Album details
“Fechando o Corpo”	Released: 2015; Formats: Digital download

==== Singles ====
Year	Song	Notes	Ref.
2015	Corpo Fechado		
2015	Exceção		
2015	Redenção		
2015	O Bom Maluco		
2016	Ge		
2016	Poetas no Topo	(Track) Pt. Makalister, BK', Menestrel, Sant, Jxnvs, Slim	
2017	Geminiano		
2017	Lupa	(Prod. Velho Beats)	
2017	Olho de Tigre		
2017	Esquimó		
2017	Vazio		
2017	Ave Maria	Djonga, Leal and ADL	
2017	O Mundo é Nosso	Pt. BK	
2017	Corre das Notas		
2017	Santa Ceia		
2018	Poesia Acústica #4 - Todo Mundo Odeia Acústico	(Track) Pt. Bob, MV Bill, Froid, Azzy, Delacruz	
2018	CORRA	pt. Paige, (Prod. Coyote Beatz)	
2018	Me orienta	pt. Mc Rick	
2018	ATÍPICO	(Prod. Coyote Beatz)	
2018	JUNHO DE 94	(Prod. Coyote Beatz)	
2018	1010	(Prod. Coyote Beatz)	
2018	SOLTO	pt.Hot, (Prod. Coyote Beatz)	
2018	UFA	pt. Sidoka and Sant, (Prod. Coyote Beatz)	
2018	ETERNO	(Prod. Coyote Beatz)	
2018	Favela Vive 3	(Track) pt. ADL, Choice, Menor do Chapa and Negra Li. (Prod. Índio and Mortão)	
2018	A Música da Mãe	(Prod. Coyote Beatz)	
2018	Yeah	with Zulu	
2019	Nossa Que Isso	WCnoBeat part. Djonga, Karol Conká, MC Rogê, and MC Rebecca	
2019	O Céu é o Limite	Devasto with BK', Emicida, Mano Brown, Djonga, Rincon Sapiência and Rael	
2019	Deus e família	with Delano and MC Hariel	
2019	Recadin Pros Falador	(Prod. Coyote Beatz)	
2020	Sexta	(Prod. Coyote Beatz)	
2020	Gueto Feroz	with Ramonzin	
2020	Toda Semana	with Shevchenko and Elloco	
2020	Voz Ativa	with Dexter, Coruja Bc1, DJ Will and KL Jay	
2020	Caçador de Vacilão	with Industria del Amor	
2020	Oclin e Evoque	Tropa do Bruxom MC Rick and Sidoka	
2021	Suíte 14	with Sest	
2021	Easy Money	(Prod. Coyote Beatz)	
2022	Mil Motivos	with Mc Hariel	

== Awards and nominations ==
Year	Award	Category	Nomination	Result
2019	2020 MTV MIAW Awards Brazil	Feat. of the Year	"Nossa Que Isso" — WCnoBeat part. Karol Conká, MC Rogê and MC Rebecca	Nominated
2019	2020 MTV MIAW Awards Brazil	BEAT Br	Djonga	Won
2019	APCA trophy	Artist of the Year	Djonga	Won
2020	MTV MIAW Awards Brazil	Big Fucking Clip award	"Eu vou" with Hot e Oreia	Nominated
2020	MTV MIAW Awards Brazil	Beat BR	Djonga	Won
2020	2020 BET Hip Hop Awards	Best International Flow	Djonga	Nominated
2022	MTV MIAW Awards Brazil	Beat BR	Djonga	Nominated
