= Estúdios Quanta =

Estúdios Quanta, in São Paulo, is a Brazilian film studio and the country's largest rental house. In 2010, Effi Wizen was the head of visual effects for Estudios Quanta.
