= Lollapalooza Brazil =

Brazilian annual music festival

- Genre: Alternative rock; punk rock; heavy metal; pop; hip hop; electronic; soul; trap; k-pop; rap
- Frequency: Annually
- Locations: Autódromo José Carlos Pace, São Paulo
- Years active: 2012–2019, 2022–present
- Inaugurated: April 7, 2012; 14 years ago
- Founders: Perry Farrell
- Most recent: March 20, 2026; 7 months ago
- Next event: March 19, 2027; 4 months' time
- Attendance: 302,600
- Website: lollapaloozabr.com

Lollapalooza Brazil is an annual festival held in São Paulo's Autódromo José Carlos Pace. It is the Brazilian edition of Lollapalooza, an international music festival originally established in the United States. The festival happens on either March or April, with the first two editions also coinciding with Holy Week.

== History ==
In 2011, following the huge success of the Chilean version that happened that year as the first edition out of the United States, a Brazilian version was confirmed. The first two editions took place at the Jockey Club in São Paulo and in the third, in 2014, it was moved to the Autódromo José Carlos Pace in the Interlagos neighborhood, where it takes place to this day.

It was produced and promoted by Time For Fun (T4F) from 2014 through 2023, following the company’s ten-year agreement with Live Nation. Starting in 2024, production and operation of the festival were transferred to Rock World, the company behind Rock in Rio and The Town, in partnership with C3 Presents, the U.S. promoter associated with the Lollapalooza brand.

The festival reached its record attendance in 2023, when 302,600 people attended across its three days.

Singer and songwriter SZA closing the 2024 edition of the festival.

== Headliners ==
Fans during 2013 edition of the festival

Dates	Headliners	Ref.
April 7–8, 2012	Foo Fighters • Arctic Monkeys • Janes Addiction	
March 29–31, 2013	Pearl Jam • The Killers • The Black Keys	
April 5–6, 2014	Muse • Arcade Fire • Soundgarden • Nine Inch Nails	
March 28–29, 2015	Jack White • Pharrell Williams • Calvin Harris • Robert Plant	
March 12–13, 2016	Eminem • Mumford & Sons • Tame Impala • Florence + the Machine • Jack Ü • Noel Gallagher • Alabama Shakes	
March 25–26, 2017	Metallica • The xx • The Chainsmokers • The Strokes • The Weeknd • Martin Garrix	
March 23–25, 2018	Pearl Jam • Red Hot Chili Peppers • The Killers • Imagine Dragons • Lana Del Rey • LCD Soundsystem	
April 5–7, 2019	Arctic Monkeys • Kings of Leon • Kendrick Lamar • Tribalistas • Lenny Kravitz • Sam Smith	
~~April 3–5, 2020~~	~~Guns N' Roses • Travis Scott • The Strokes • Lana Del Rey • Martin Garrix • Gwen Stefani~~	
March 25–27, 2022	The Strokes • Doja Cat • Machine Gun Kelly • Miley Cyrus • ASAP Rocky • Tribute performance by Planet Hemp, Emicida, and more • Martin Garrix	
March 24–26, 2023	Billie Eilish • Tame Impala • Rosalía • Lil Nas X • Skrillex • Twenty One Pilots	
March 22–24, 2024	Blink-182 • SZA • Kings of Leon • Sam Smith • Arcade Fire • Limp Bizkit • Titãs	
March 28–30, 2025	Olivia Rodrigo • Justin Timberlake • Shawn Mendes • Alanis Morissette • Rüfüs Du Sol • Tool	
March 20–22, 2026	Sabrina Carpenter • Tyler, the Creator • Chappell Roan • Deftones • Lorde • Skrillex • Doechii • Turnstile • Lewis Capaldi	
March 19–21, 2027	Travis Scott • Charli XCX • The Killers • David Guetta • Queens Of The Stone Age • The Neighbourhood • Fontaines D.C. • The Prodigy • Sombr • Mochakk	

Artists announced as replacements, not originally on the line-up, are presented in italic.

== Cancellations ==
Among the most notable cancellations, Marina and the Diamonds withdrew from the 2015 edition due to a canceled flight from New York to São Paulo and was replaced by Kongos. Snoop Dogg canceled his 2016 performance for personal reasons and was replaced by Planet Hemp.

In 2019, a storm cut short the concerts of both American band LANY, and Brazilian rapper Rashid. Rashid would in 2022 again have his set cancelled due to weather conditions once a storm alert was issued, before he finally performed a full set in 2023. LANY would return to Brazil thrice afterwards, though in 2026 to their surprise they were not called for Lollapalooza Brazil in spite of the Chilean and Argentinian editions doing so, prompting singer Paul Klein to repeatedly insult its organizers while performing in São Paulo a week before the festival.

The 2020 edition, originally scheduled for April 3–5, was postponed to December 4–6 due to the COVID-19 pandemic and later rescheduled for September 10–12, 2021, before the festival was ultimately canceled; the event returned with a new edition in March 2022.

In 2022, Foo Fighters canceled their headline performance following the death of drummer Taylor Hawkins two days before the festival. Their slot was filled by a tribute performance featuring eight Brazilian rap acts, including Planet Hemp and Emicida.

The 2023 edition had two headline cancellations. Blink-182 withdrew from the festival because of drummer Travis Barker's hand injury and was replaced by Twenty One Pilots. Drake subsequently canceled his performance on the day of the festival, citing unforeseen circumstances, and was replaced by Skrillex. Other cancellations that year included Willow Smith, Omar Apollo, Dominic Fike, and 100 gecs, being replaced by Baco Exu do Blues, The Rose, Mother Mother and Almanac.

Two months prior the festival in 2024, Paramore canceled their headline performance for personal reasons and was replaced by Kings of Leon. Rina Sawayama, Dove Cameron and Jaden Smith also withdrew from the lineup; Sawayama was replaced by Jessie Reyez, while Cameron was replaced by Greta Van Fleet.

In 2025, Fontaines D.C. canceled their performance after vocalist Grian Chatten was diagnosed with a herniated disc. The festival added White Denim to the line-up.

Three artists withdrew from the 2026 edition, with Lola Young cancelling after she collapsed during the 2025 All Things Go Music Festival and decided to take a break, D4vd ending up charged in a homicide case, and The Dare claiming personal reasons. Blood Orange and Ruel were subsequently added.
