= Monkeybuzz =

Brazilian online music magazine

- Website type: Online magazine
- Available in: Portuguese
- Country of origin: Brazil
- Creator: Lucas Repullo
- Website: monkeybuzz.com.br
- Launched: 2012; 14 years ago
- Current status: Defunct 5 November 2025; 10 months ago

Monkeybuzz was a Brazilian independent music journalism website founded in 2012 by Lucas Repullo. The platform published news, reviews, articles, interviews, and audiovisual content, concentrating on alternative and independent music.

The editorial team initially consisted of three core members: Lucas Repullo (editor-in-chief), Nik Silva, and André Felipe de Medeiros. Additional contributors, some with backgrounds in blogging or music writing, also participated. The review process was collaborative, with submissions edited by an assigned reviewer to align with the site's editorial line. On 5 November 2025, Repullo announced that Monkeybuzz would cease publishing new content, while its existing archives would remain available online.

== History ==
Monkeybuzz was founded in 2012 by Lucas Repullo, who was 20 years old at the time. Inspired by international publications such as Pitchfork, Repullo sought to create a professional music journalism outlet in Brazil. The project was launched after a lengthy preparation period, with more than one hundred album reviews ready upon release. The outlet's language is informal and explanatory.

In 2013 the website introduced "Monkeybuzz 2.0", a redesigned version with a more visual layout, improved navigation, and a built-in music player based on SoundCloud. In its early years, the platform received consulting support from Escola Superior de Propaganda e Marketing's (ESPM) business incubator and later collaborated with Balaclava Records to organize live events. Monkeybuzz was also integrated into MTV Brasil's online portal, expanding its visibility.

By 2014, Monkeybuzz's social media following, particularly on Facebook, had reached tens of thousands of users, comparable to that of established Brazilian music magazines. It has been identified in academic literature as one of the most relevant specialized music platforms in Brazil, particularly in the promotion of alternative and independent music, and topics that are rarely discussed in music journalism. To mark its fifth anniversary in 2017, Monkeybuzz curated a series of monthly shows at the São Paulo venue Breve, featuring local bands.

On 5 November 2025, Repullo announced the end of Monkeybuzz's updates, keeping the site's archives on air.
