= Balaclava Records =

Brazilian independent record label

- Founded: 2012; 13 years ago
- Founder: Fernando Dotta, Rafael Farah
- Distributor(s): Ditto Music
- Genre: Indie rock; alternative rock; noise
- Country of origin: Brazil
- Location: São Paulo
- Official website: www.lojabalaclava.com.br

Balaclava Records is a Brazilian independent record label, music production company, and webzine founded in 2012 by Fernando Dotta and Rafael Farah. The label plays an important role in the Brazilian indie rock, alternative rock, and noise music scenes, with the main goal of providing artists with visibility that many other companies do not offer.

The label has released over 50 artists from various countries, including licenses from international independent labels such as Stones Throw, Merge Records, Captured Tracks, and Polyvinyl. It has also become one of the main promoters in South America through the Balaclava Fest, which has established itself as one of the most important pop and alternative music festivals nationally and internationally, having booked several high-profile acts in Brazil such as Primal Scream, Slowdive, Mac DeMarco, Warpaint, Future Islands, Ride, Kelela, Connan Mockasin, Black Midi, and Vagabon.

== History ==
=== 2012–2014: Early years ===
Musicians Fernando Dotta and Rafael Farah were part of a rock band called Single Parents and were familiar with bands from other parts of Brazil. They considered bringing these bands together to "create a scene, a circuit", according to Fernando. In late 2011, they left their jobs and began working full-time in music. Balaclava Records was founded in 2012 and debuted with Single Parents' debut album, Unrest, which was also the penultimate release of the Trama label's Virtual Album project.

During this early period, Balaclava signed several artists from the Brazilian independent rock scene such as Bonifrate, Terno Rei, Luziluzia, and Roberto Kramer, in addition to international bands like Minks and Splashh. Album releases like Intropologia of Medialunas, Vigília of Terno Rei, and Mountain Tops of Câmera received praise.

=== 2015–2019: Balaclava Fest, rise in popularity, and partnerships ===
On 21 April 2015, the label launched the Balaclava Fest and hosted Mac McCaughan, an American musician known for being part of the band Superchunk and for founding the independent label Merge Records, who became the main attraction of the night alongside the São Paulo band Shed. On 21 October, Canadian musician Mac DeMarco performed at Balaclava Fest to promote his mini-LP Another One, released globally on 7 August. The event also featured other international artists such as Swervedriver, Yuck, Tops, and Mild High Club, as well as national bands Mahmed and Terno Rei, with live sets from Séculos Apaixonados, Jovem Palerosi, and Nuven.

On 14 May 2016, the label's festival hosted the English shoegaze band Slowdive, who were touring South America for the first time. The event also included the instrumental rock band E a Terra Nunca Me Pareceu Tão Distante and was held at Cine Joia. In the 2019 edition of Balaclava Fest, the label decided to diversify the lineup by inviting artists outside the independent rock scene. Performers included Elza Soares, Kelela, Ryley Walker, among others.

=== 2020–present: Radar Balaclava ===
In 2020, the label launched the Radar Balaclava project, which consists of releasing a track or single distributed by the label on all digital platforms, with the goal of giving visibility to artists not yet signed to any label and seeking an opportunity to boost their releases.
