= Bom Mesmo É Estar Debaixo D'Água =

Studio album by Luedji Luna
- Released: October 14, 2020
- Genres: Latin; MPB; pop
- Length: 49:54
- Producers: Kato Change; Luedji Luna

Luedji Luna chronology
Um Corpo no Mundo (2012)	Bom Mesmo É Estar Debaixo D'Água (2020)	Bom Mesmo é Estar Debaixo D'Água Deluxe (2022)

Bom Mesmo É Estar Debaixo D'Água is the second studio album by the Brazilian singer Luedji Luna. It was nominated for a Latin Grammy Award for Best MPB (Musica Popular Brasileira) Album. A deluxe version of the album was released in 2022 and included 10 new songs.

In May 2021, Luna performed three tracks from the album for NPR's Tiny Desk (Home) Concert series, specifically for Tiny Desk Meets AFROPUNK.

Several tracks include poetry from noted Afro-Brazilian writers. The opening track, Uanga, was written and interpreted by Lande Onawale. The fourth track, Ain't Got No, partially covers Nina Simone's Ain't Got No, I Got Life, followed by poetry by Conceição Evaristo. The ninth track, Lençóis, features the poem "Quase," by Tatiana Nascimento.

Luna also includes allusions to African American writers and abolitionists, such as the song title Ain't I a Woman? referencing the book by bell hooks and, ultimately, the 1851 speech by Sojourner Truth.

== Accompanying visual album ==
Bom Mesmo É Estar Debaixo D'Água was accompanied by the release of a twenty-three minute film of the same title. The visual album features six of the album's tracks, including the first five tracks and Lençóis. The film was directed by Joyce Prado, who claims inspiration from Beyoncé's Lemonade.

== Track listing ==
Credits adapted from Discogs site for tracks where information was available.

Bom Mesmo É Estar Debaixo D'Água CD and Streaming edition
No.	Title	Writer(s)	Performer(s)	Length
1.	"Uanga"	Lande Onawale	Lande Onawale; Totó Cruz	1:08
2.	"Tirania"	Luedji Luna; Ravi Landin	Luedji Luna; Kato Change; Christian Kibamba; Tsanta Randri; Emerson De Biaggi; Caio Paiva Dos Santos; Luís Amato; Bob Suetholz; Caê Rolfsen	4:24
3.	"Chororô"	François Muleka; Luedji Luna	Luna; Change; Kibamba; Randri; Nirina	3:30
4.	"Ain't Got No"	Galt MacDermot; Gerome Ragni; James Rado; Conceição Evaristo	Luna; Change; Kibamba; Randri; Nirina; Conceição Evaristo	2:48
5.	"Ain't I a Woman?"	Luedji Luna; Ravi Landin	Luna; Change; Kibamba; Randri; Nirina; Rudson Daniel	3:47
6.	"Recado"	Luedji Luna; Dejanira Rainha Santos Melo		4:00
7.	"Bom Mesmo É Estar Debaixo D'Água"	François Muleka; Luedji Luna	Luna; Change; Kibamba; Randri; Nirina; Isaac Kimani; Lisa Oduor-Noah	4:30
8.	"Origami"	Goulart Gomes; Carlos Ribeiro		5:46
9.	"Lençóis"	Cidinha da Silva; Luedji Luna; Tatiana Nascimento	Luna; Change; Kibamba; Randri; Nirina; Tatiana Nascimento	6:54
10.	"Erro"	Luedji Luna; Marissol Mwaba	Luna; Change; Kibamba; Randri; Nirina; Kimani; Oduor-Noah	3:36
11.	"Manto da Noite"	Luedji Luna	Luna; Change; Kibamba; Randri; Nirina	4:12
12.	"Goteira"	Luedji Luna	Luna; Change; Kibamba; Randri; Nirina; André Ricardo; Aziz Mbaye; Moustapha Dieng; Mayara Almeida Da Silva; Douglas Da Silva Antunes; Estefane De Souza Santos	5:19
Total length:				49:54
