= Marissol Mwaba =

- Born: Jacqueline Marissol Omega Muleka Mwewa Mwaba; 17 September 1991 (age 34); Brasília, Brazil
- Genres: MPB; Romantic music
- Occupations: Singer, composer, multi-instrumentalist
- Years active: 2011—present

Marissol Mwaba, the artistic name of Jacqueline Marissol Omega Muleka Mwewa Mwaba (born 17 September 1991), is a Brazilian singer, composer, and multi-instrumentalist of Congolese origin. The artist has already released two self-penned albums and was on the 2018 edition of The Voice Brasil. In 2017, her song, "Notícias de Salvador", which she coauthored with her brother François Muleka, became widely known after being sung by Luedji Luna.

In 2019, Mwaba recorded songs on albums for artists such as Chico César, Emicida, and Rincon Sapiência, and participated with Rael on the single "Quero Te Ver Bem Amanhã", released by Fióti. The singer also collaborated on stage and in the studio with artists such as Drik Barbosa, Alegre Corrêa, her brother François, and Kabé Pinheiro. She currently presents the show Lamuka (meaning to awaken/wake up in Swahili), that was done as a national tour. She was the show opener for Emicida at Circo Voador, as well as for Xênia França in Florianópolis.

== Biography ==
Mwaba was born on 17 September 1991 in Brasília to academic parents from the Democratic Republic of Congo. They had previously formed a band together. Artistically, she was influenced by the Congolese music from the 1960s and 1970s that she grew up with, along with Brazilian pop-rock. She received a guitar from her father at age 8. Her brother François, 7 years her senior, studied the instrument to teach Marissol, the youngest in the family, and the two became self-taught musicians. Her musical style ranges considerably, to which she jokes that it is "a new MPB with eccentric pop". Mwaba's music is marked by a fusion of a diverse set of musical influences with the African cultural panorama, mainly with the music of the former Katanga province in the DRC. She has composed in her own musical style since she was 9 years old. She studied astrophysics at Sorbonne University in Paris, France, and did further research at the Institut d'Astrophysique de Paris, where she had an article published to Astronomy & Astrophysics.

Along with her solo career, she developed partnerships with people in the music scene in her native Santa Catarina, including works with Trio Karibu (where she sings in two songs on their CD), with her brother François (CD Feijão e Sonho also has her voice in the tracks), and Dandara Manoela, with whom she started the duo Mwangaza.

In September 2015, while in France, she took part in special performances with singer Alpha Paulay at shows in Ranchal and Paris. While also accompanied by David Cavalcante, Mwaba was one of the 5 finalists in the 2016 edition of the Incroyables Talents de Sorbonne Universités competition in Paris, where she also released her first CD, Luz-A-zuL. That year as well, she took part as well in a show by MC Soom T alongside Alpha Petulay at Festival Woodstower in Lyon.

Luz-A-zuL – which also had a launch show in Brazil in October 2016 at SESC Prainha in Florianopolis – brought to stage compositions by the singer, along with her partnerships with Muleka. She also participated in albums by Alegre Corrêa, A Pedra que Ronca, Cristiano Forte, Nego Magoy, Renata Corrêa, and Trovão Rocha. The work was recorded under the executive production of Boaventura Soluções Culturais, mixed captioning and editing by Francis Pedemonte, musical production Muleka and Pedemonte, general direction by Mwewa Lumbwe, photographic and art direction by Alice Assal, photographs by Renan Rosa, and design by Tina Merz. She also participated in 2018 edition of The Voice Brasil.

Recently, Mwaba had gained fame when she participated in the song “Principia” in AmarElo, Emicida's most recent album. The rapper described Mwaba as the “fury of the suns beauty” and said that he would bring her to open his show at the Circo Voador in June 2019. Singer and businessman Fióti, Emicida's brother, is one of the musical godfathers of Mwaba, together with singer and composer Chico César. Someone who also inspired Mwaba greatly is Luedji Luna, who also recorded two of her compositions in her albums, “Notícias de Salvador” and “Erro”, and who has described her as a "very versatile composer" and "one of the best that we have in this country". She has also received high praises from various artists in Brazil, such as Rael, Mariana Aydar, Rashid, Drik Barbosa, and Gilberto Gil, who praised her talent on Twitter, sharing a verse that she did for “Esotérico”.

Recognized for her role in duo and idols, Mwaba now searches for a larger audience for her current work, that produced an album, “Luz-A-zul” (2016), and a live session album “Palavra mágica acústico rec’n’play” (2018), and saw another achievement in 2021 with the "Ndeke" project (which translates to bird in Swahili, a reference to the phoenix), that would bring a collection of unreleased songs. The first step was made through a clip for "Toda quinta", released two weeks prior, in which she illustrates before and after another unique aspect of her work: the use of her own method, called the Reversas de Lossiram, through which she chants melodies and lyrics from songs and poetry in reverse, creating her own language.

== Discography ==
=== Albums ===
Year	Title
2015	Luz Azul
2018	Palavra mágica - acústico (rec’n’play)
2021	IMANI

Year	Title
2018	Toda Quinta
2021	Chupando Versos (feat. Drik Barbosa; François Muleka; Linn da Quebrada; Lucs Romero)
2021	SOL (feat. Rincon Sapiência)
2021	Marte (feat. Tuyo; Mônica Agena)

=== Video clips ===
Year	Title
2021	Toda Quinta
2021	Chupando Verso
2021	SOL
