= The Voice Brasil season 7 =

The Voice Brasil
- Season 7
- Hosted by: Tiago Leifert; Mariana Rios
- Judges: Carlinhos Brown; Michel Teló; Ivete Sangalo; Lulu Santos
- Winner: Léo Pain

Release
- Original network: Rede Globo
- Original release: July 17 – September 27, 2018

Season chronology
- ← Previous; Season 6 Next → Season 8

The seventh season of The Voice Brasil, premiered on Rede Globo on July 17, 2018 in the 10:30 / 9:30 p.m. (BRT / AMT) slot immediately following the primetime telenovela Segundo Sol.

The show is again hosted by Tiago Leifert, with Mariana Rios serving as backstage host for the third consecutive year. Carlinhos Brown, Ivete Sangalo, Lulu Santos and Michel Teló also returned as the coaches.

For the first time, the show is airing during the Southern Hemisphere winter, following the spring airing of the past six seasons and also two times a week (Tuesdays and Thursdays). In addition, teams increased to 18, up from 12.

Léo Pain won the competition on September 27, 2018 with 50.01% of the final vote, marking Michel Teló's fourth straight win as a coach, a first in the entire The Voice franchise.

== Teams ==
Key

- Winner
- Runners-up
- Eliminated in the Live shows
- Stolen in the Remix
- Eliminated in the Remix
- Eliminated in the Live Coaches' Battle
- Eliminated in the Live Playoffs
- Stolen in the Battle rounds
- Eliminated in the Battle rounds

| Coaches | Top 72 artists | | | | | |
|---|---|---|---|---|---|---|
| Carlinhos Brown | | | | | | |
| Carlinhos Brown | Erica Natuza | Murilo Bispo | David Nascimento | Kelvin Bruno | Cristiane Santos | Helen Cristina |
| Carlinhos Brown | Lia Gondim | Maraia Takai | Nina Black | Rê Adegas | LC Negão | Meggie Santos |
| Carlinhos Brown | Raissa Araújo | ~~Damiana Sadili~~ | ~~Mariá Pinkusfeld~~ | Dimadú | Flávia Souza | Gabriê |
| Carlinhos Brown | Guipson Pierre | Jamille Alves | Renata Versolato | Roberto Küster | | |
| Michel Teló | | | | | | |
| Michel Teló | Léo Pain | Lais Yasmin | Dri | Morgana Rodrigues | ~~Arthur Henrique~~ | ~~Kelvin Bruno~~ |
| Michel Teló | ~~Micaella Marinho~~ | Andressa Hayalla | Renan Valentti | Isa Salles | Letícia Gonçalves | Lílian Menezes |
| Michel Teló | ~~Isa Guerra~~ | ~~Murilo Bispo~~ | Ally | Carolina Lelis | Indira Mel | Marcio & Douglas |
| Michel Teló | Samara Souto | D'Lucca & Gabriel | Renan Cavolik | | | |
| Ivete Sangalo | | | | | | |
| Ivete Sangalo | Kevin Ndjana | Edson Carlos | Marine Lima | Flávia Gabê | Damiana Sadili | Gisele Lira |
| Ivete Sangalo | Jennifer Rocha | Júlia Dantas | Tamires Braga | Alan Camargo | Mariá Pinkusfeld | Ramon Nascimento |
| Ivete Sangalo | ~~Andressa Hayalla~~ | ~~Gika Bacci~~ | ~~Isa Salles~~ | ~~Zack~~ | Alícia Sá | Camila Pelegrina |
| Ivete Sangalo | Larice Barreto | Sarah Renata | Géssica Lima | | | |
| Lulu Santos | | | | | | |
| Lulu Santos | Isa Guerra | Priscila Tossan | Arthur Henrique | Micaella Marinho | Cadu Duarte | Dreicon |
| Lulu Santos | Gika Bacci | Giulia Sant'Ana | Larissa Viana | Suelen Karine | Tai Chiaro | Daniel Lopes |
| Lulu Santos | Thailla Lima | Zack | ~~Arthur Henrique~~ | ~~LC Negão~~ | ~~Raissa Araújo~~ | ~~Tamires Braga~~ |
| Lulu Santos | Barbara Ferr | Ian Alone | Lucas Nage | Rafaela Porto | Tamara Angel | |
Note: Italicized names are stolen contestants (names struck through within former teams).

== Blind auditions ==
A new feature within the Blind Auditions this season is the Block, which each coach can use once to prevent one of the other coaches from getting a contestant.

Key

| ✔ | Coach pressed "I WANT YOU" button |
| | Artist defaulted to a coach's team |
| | Artist picked a coach's team |
| | Artist eliminated with no coach pressing their button |
| | Artist is an 'All Star' contestant |
| ✘ | Coach pressed "I WANT YOU" button, but was blocked by Brown |
| ✘ | Coach pressed "I WANT YOU" button, but was blocked by Teló |
| ✘ | Coach pressed "I WANT YOU" button, but was blocked by Ivete |
| ✘ | Coach pressed "I WANT YOU" button, but was blocked by Lulu |

=== Episode 1 (July 17) ===
The Coaches performed País Tropical at the end of the show.

| Order | Artist | Age | Hometown | Song | Coach's and contestant's choices | | | |
| Order | Artist | Age | Hometown | Song | Brown | Teló | Ivete | Lulu |
|---|---|---|---|---|---|---|---|---|
| 1 | Júlia Dantas | 30 | Fortaleza | "Começaria Tudo Outra Vez" | ✔ | ✔ | ✔ | ✔ |
| 2 | Daniel Lopes | 41 | Fortaleza | "Girls Like You" | ✔ | — | — | ✔ |
| 3 | Erica Natuza | 26 | Recife | "Pesadão" | ✔ | — | — | ✔ |
| 4 | Kevin Ndjana | 24 | João Pessoa | "Uptown Funk" | ✘ | ✔ | ✔ | ✔ |
| 5 | Samara Souto | 22 | Maceió | "No Dia Do Seu Casamento" | — | ✔ | — | — |
| 6 | Thay Silva | 16 | Recife | "Não Me Deixe Só" | — | — | — | — |
| 7 | Cristiane Santos | 19 | Sítio do Quinto | "À Primeira Vista" | ✔ | ✔ | — | — |
| 8 | Jacira Maria Flor | 50 | Salvador | "Alguém Me Avisou" | — | — | — | — |
| 9 | Ally | 17 | Recife | "Dark Horse" | — | ✔ | — | — |

=== Episode 2 (July 19) ===
| Order | Artist | Age | Hometown | Song | Coach's and contestant's choices | | | |
| Order | Artist | Age | Hometown | Song | Brown | Teló | Ivete | Lulu |
|---|---|---|---|---|---|---|---|---|
| 1 | Larissa Viana | 22 | Petrópolis | "Man in the Mirror" | ✔ | ✔ | ✔ | ✔ |
| 2 | Indira Mel | 30 | Governador Valadares | "Regime Fechado" | — | ✔ | — | — |
| 3 | Maraia Takai | 19 | Cabo de Santo Agostinho | "Don't You Worry 'bout a Thing" | ✔ | — | — | — |
| 4 | Léo Pain | 34 | Alegrete | "Dormi na Praça" | ✔ | ✔ | ✔ | — |
| 5 | Amanda Cadore | 22 | Chapecó | "The House of the Rising Sun" | — | — | — | — |
| 6 | Barbara Ferr | 23 | Rio de Janeiro | "Blues da Piedade" | — | — | — | ✔ |
| 7 | Rê Adegas | 37 | Porto Alegre | "Vou Deitar e Rolar (Qua Qua Ra Qua Qua)" | ✔ | ✔ | — | — |
| 8 | Marissol Mwaba | 26 | Florianópolis | "Rosa" | — | — | — | — |
| 9 | Lucas Nage | 24 | São Paulo | "Sonhar" | — | — | — | ✔ |
| 10 | Alan Camargo | 28 | Rio de Janeiro | "Eu Amo Você" | ✔ | ✔ | ✔ | ✔ |
| 11 | Mariá Pinkusfeld | 33 | Rio de Janeiro | "Moça Bonita" | ✔ | — | — | — |

=== Episode 3 (July 24) ===
| Order | Artist | Age | Hometown | Song | Coach's and contestant's choices | | | |
| Order | Artist | Age | Hometown | Song | Brown | Teló | Ivete | Lulu |
|---|---|---|---|---|---|---|---|---|
| 1 | Tai Chiaro | 27 | Cabo Frio | "I Kissed a Girl" | ✔ | ✔ | — | ✔ |
| 2 | Rafael de Lazare | 25 | São Paulo | "Minha Alma" | — | — | — | — |
| 3 | Andressa Hayalla | 23 | Águas Claras | "Paciência" | ✔ | ✔ | ✔ | ✔ |
| 4 | Guipson Pierre | 26 | Port-au-Prince, Haiti | "Love Yourself" | ✔ | — | — | ✔ |
| 5 | Ramon Nascimento | 25 | Betim | "Lilás" | ✔ | ✔ | ✔ | — |
| 6 | Dreicon | 24 | São Paulo | "Cuidado" | — | — | — | ✔ |
| 7 | Gabriê | 20 | Porto Velho | "Não Existe Amor em SP" | ✔ | — | — | — |
| 8 | Pam Steebler | 29 | New York City, U.S. | "Final Feliz" | — | — | — | — |
| 9 | Lílian Menezes | 40 | São Paulo | "Comportamento Geral" | ✔ | ✔ | — | — |
| 10 | David Nascimento | 25 | Itabuna | "O Sol" | ✔ | — | — | — |
| 11 | Micaella Marinho | 16 | Passos | "That's My Girl" | ✔ | ✔ | — | — |

=== Episode 4 (July 26) ===
| Order | Artist | Age | Hometown | Song | Coach's and contestant's choices | | | |
| Order | Artist | Age | Hometown | Song | Brown | Teló | Ivete | Lulu |
|---|---|---|---|---|---|---|---|---|
| 1 | Damiana Sadili | 24 | Rio de Janeiro | "Espelho" | ✔ | — | — | ✔ |
| 2 | D'Lucca & Gabriel | 27–25 | São Bernardo do Campo | "Amor da Sua Cama" | — | ✔ | — | — |
| 3 | Luiza Oliveira | 22 | Belo Horizonte | "You and I" | — | — | — | — |
| 4 | Raissa Araújo | 28 | Lauro de Freitas | "Só Tinha de Ser com Você" | — | — | — | ✔ |
| 5 | Gika Bacci | 29 | Ribeirão Preto | "Proud Mary" | ✔ | ✔ | ✔ | ✔ |
| 6 | Letícia Gonçalves | 22 | Fernandópolis | "Infiel" | ✔ | ✔ | — | — |
| 7 | Roberto Küster | 19 | Guarapuava | "Shape of You" | ✔ | — | — | — |
| 8 | Renan Cavolik | 24 | Jundiaí | "K.O." | ✔ | ✔ | — | — |
| 9 | Thailla Lima | 24 | Pio XII | "Propaganda" | — | — | — | ✔ |
| 10 | Dimadú | 31 | Rio de Janeiro | "Papel Marché" | ✔ | — | — | — |
| 11 | Marcela Martins | 27 | Paranavaí | "Say Something" | — | — | — | — |
| 12 | Edson Carlos | 32 | Vitória | "Se For Pra Judiar" | ✔ | ✘ | ✔ | — |

=== Episode 5 (July 31) ===
| Order | Artist | Age | Hometown | Song | Coach's and contestant's choices | | | |
| Order | Artist | Age | Hometown | Song | Brown | Teló | Ivete | Lulu |
|---|---|---|---|---|---|---|---|---|
| 1 | Helen Cristina | 32 | Santo André | "If I Ain't Got You" | ✔ | ✔ | — | ✔ |
| 2 | Kelvin Bruno | 26 | Cabo Frio | "Quero Ser Feliz Também" | ✔ | ✔ | — | ✔ |
| 3 | Flávia Gabê | 21 | Curitiba | "Quando Fui Chuva" | ✔ | ✔ | ✔ | ✔ |
| 4 | Gabriel Vicente | 24 | São Paulo | "Flor de Lis" | — | — | — | — |
| 5 | Giulia Sant' Ana | 16 | Assis | "Rise Up" | — | — | — | ✔ |
| 6 | Dri | 32 | Agudos | "What's Up?" | ✔ | ✔ | ✔ | ✔ |
| 7 | Larice Barreto | 23 | Campos dos Goytacazes | "Boate Azul" | — | — | ✔ | — |
| 8 | Michele Andrade | 24 | Barreiros | "Na Hora de Amar" | — | — | — | — |
| 9 | Flávia Souza | 22 | Araras | "126 Cabides" | ✔ | — | — | — |
| 10 | LC Negão | 35 | Santos | "O Que Sobrou do Céu" | — | — | — | ✔ |
| 11 | Isa Guerra | 18 | Belo Horizonte | "Havana" | ✔ | ✔ | — | ✔ |
| 12 | Camila Pelegrina | 22 | São Paulo | "New Rules" | ✔ | — | ✔ | ✔ |

=== Episode 6 (Aug. 2) ===
| Order | Artist | Age | Hometown | Song | Coach's and contestant's choices | | | |
| Order | Artist | Age | Hometown | Song | Brown | Teló | Ivete | Lulu |
|---|---|---|---|---|---|---|---|---|
| 1 | Tamara Angel | 27 | São Paulo | "Esse Tal de Rock Enrow" | — | — | — | ✔ |
| 2 | Léo Oliveira | 21 | Rio Grande | "Travessia" | — | — | — | — |
| 3 | Alícia Sá | 19 | Pedra Branca do Amapari | "When I Was Your Man" | — | — | ✔ | ✔ |
| 4 | Renata Versolato | 33 | São Paulo | "Black Is Beautiful" | ✔ | — | — | ✔ |
| 5 | Renan Valentti | 33 | Sorocaba | "Fruto Especial" | ✔ | ✔ | ✔ | — |
| 6 | Priscila Tossan | 28 | Rio de Janeiro | "Ainda é Cedo" | ✔ | ✔ | ✔ | ✔ |
| 7 | Sarah Renata | 25 | Presidente Prudente | "Amor de Índio" | — | — | ✔ | — |
| 8 | Arthur Henrique | 23 | Goiânia | "Rude" | ✔ | ✔ | — | ✔ |
| 9 | Meggie Santos | 24 | Salvador | "Boa Noite" | ✔ | — | — | — |
| 10 | Ana Laura | 19 | Divinópolis | "Tocando em Frente" | — | — | — | — |
| 11 | Isa Salles | 26 | São Paulo | "Mamma Knows Best" | ✔ | ✔ | ✔ | ✘ |

=== Episode 7 (Aug. 7) ===
| Order | Artist | Age | Hometown | Song | Coach's and contestant's choices | | | |
| Order | Artist | Age | Hometown | Song | Brown | Teló | Ivete | Lulu |
|---|---|---|---|---|---|---|---|---|
| 1 | Jennifer Rocha | 20 | Curitiba | "(You Make Me Feel Like)..." | ✔ | ✔ | ✔ | ✔ |
| 2 | Jamille Alves | 28 | Ilhéus | "Joga Fora" | ✔ | — | — | ✔ |
| 3 | Rafaela Porto | 18 | Fortaleza | "Estranho" | — | — | — | ✔ |
| 4 | Aísha Campos | 18 | São Paulo | "Envolvidão" | — | — | — | — |
| 5 | Carolina Lelis | 29 | São Paulo | "Barracão de Zinco" | — | ✔ | — | — |
| 6 | Zack | 30 | Araruama | "Não Precisa Mudar" | — | — | ✔ | — |
| 7 | Marcio & Douglas | 28–32 | Limeira | "Diz pra Mim" | — | ✔ | ✔ | — |
| 8 | Mariana Alho | 29 | Rio de Janeiro | "O Nosso Amor a Gente Inventa" | — | — | — | — |
| 9 | Gisele Lira | 25 | São Paulo | "Will You Still Love Me Tomorrow" | ✔ | ✔ | ✔ | ✔ |
| 10 | Lia Gondim | 36 | Salvador | "Deixa Eu Dizer" | ✔ | — | — | ✔ |
| 11 | Ian Alone | 26 | Belo Horizonte | "My Girl" | — | — | — | ✔ |

=== Episode 8 (Aug. 9) ===
| Order | Artist | Age | Hometown | Song | Coach's and contestant's choices | | | |
| Order | Artist | Age | Hometown | Song | Brown | Teló | Ivete | Lulu |
|---|---|---|---|---|---|---|---|---|
| 1 | Marine Lima | 20 | Catanduvas | "Piece of My Heart" | ✔ | — | ✔ | ✔ |
| 2 | Murilo Bispo | 21 | São Paulo | "Coração de Papel" | ✔ | ✔ | — | ✔ |
| 3 | Tamires Braga | 25 | Vila Velha | "Alô! Alô! Marciano" | — | — | — | ✔ |
| 4 | Lais Yasmin | 27 | Cuiabá | "Eu Só Queria Te Amar" | — | ✔ | ✔ | — |
| 5 | Suelen Karine | 30 | Rio Claro | "Azul" | ✔ | ✔ | ✘ | ✔ |
| 6 | Bruno Tini | 20 | Pirassununga | "Mercy" | — | — | — | — |
| 7 | Géssica Lima | 27 | Salvador | "As Canções Que Você Fez Pra Mim" | ✔ | — | ✔ | ✔ |
| 8 | Nina Black | 35 | Nilópolis | "Gostava Tanto de Você" | ✔ | — | Team full | ✔ |
| 9 | Cadu Duarte | 29 | São José | "Your Song" | Team full | — | Team full | ✔ |
| 10 | Morgana Rodrigues | 17 | Ponta Porã | "Pagode em Brasília / Chora Viola" | Team full | ✔ | Team full | Team full |

== The Battles ==
The 'block' twist, featured in the Blind Auditions, is also used in the Battle rounds. With this twist, each coach can use once to prevent one of the other coaches from getting a contestant in the "steals". Each coach is allowed to steal three losing artists from other teams, just like the first two seasons.

Key

| | Artist won the Battle and advanced to the Live Playoffs |
| | Artist lost the Battle but was stolen by another coach and advanced to the Live Playoffs |
| | Artist lost the Battle and was eliminated |
| ✘ | Coach pressed "STEAL" button, but was blocked by Brown |
| ✘ | Coach pressed "STEAL" button, but was blocked by Teló |
| ✘ | Coach pressed "STEAL" button, but was blocked by Ivete |
| ✘ | Coach pressed "STEAL" button, but was blocked by Lulu |

| Episode | Coach | Order | Winner | Song | Loser | Steal result | | | |
| Episode | Coach | Order | Winner | Song | Loser | Brown | Teló | Ivete | Lulu |
|---|---|---|---|---|---|---|---|---|---|
| Episode 9 (August 14) | Lulu Santos | 1 | Suelen Karine | "1 Minuto" | LC Negão | ✔ | — | — | N/A |
| Episode 9 (August 14) | Michel Teló | 2 | Letícia Gonçalves | "Ginga" | Renan Cavolik | — | N/A | — | — |
| Episode 9 (August 14) | Ivete Sangalo | 3 | Kevin Ndjana | "Meu Abrigo" | Zack | — | — | N/A | ✔ |
| Episode 9 (August 14) | Carlinhos Brown | 4 | Nina Black | "O Telefone Tocou Novamente" | Dimadú | N/A | — | — | — |
| Episode 9 (August 14) | Ivete Sangalo | 5 | Marine Lima | "Do It Like a Dude" | Isa Salles | ✘ | ✔ | N/A | — |
| Episode 9 (August 14) | Lulu Santos | 6 | Giulia Sant'Ana | "Zero a Dez" | Rafaela Porto | — | — | — | N/A |
| Episode 9 (August 14) | Carlinhos Brown | 7 | Erica Natuza | "Will I See You" | Damiana Sadili | N/A | — | ✔ | — |
| Episode 9 (August 14) | Ivete Sangalo | 8 | Ramon Nascimento | "Amor Meu Grande Amor" | Géssica Lima | — | — | N/A | — |
| Episode 9 (August 14) | Michel Teló | 9 | Lais Yasmin | "You're Still the One" | D'Lucca & Gabriel | — | N/A | — | — |
| Episode 9 (August 14) | Lulu Santos | 10 | Priscila Tossan | "Tudo que Ela Gosta de Escutar" | Tamara Angel | — | — | — | N/A |
| Episode 9 (August 14) | Michel Teló | 11 | Kelvin Bruno | "Clocks" | Murilo Bispo | ✔ | N/A | — | — |
| Episode 10 (August 16) | Lulu Santos | 1 | Larissa Viana | "One and Only" | Tamires Braga | ✔ | ✔ | ✔ | N/A |
| Episode 10 (August 16) | Michel Teló | 2 | Morgana Rodrigues | "Saudade de Minha Terra" | Samara Souto | — | N/A | — | — |
| Episode 10 (August 16) | Ivete Sangalo | 3 | Júlia Dantas | "Vitoriosa" | Sarah Renata | — | — | N/A | — |
| Episode 10 (August 16) | Carlinhos Brown | 4 | Lia Gondim | "Água de Beber" | Renata Versolato | N/A | — | — | — |
| Episode 10 (August 16) | Ivete Sangalo | 5 | Alan Camargo | "Te Pegar" | Andressa Hayalla | ✔ | ✔ | N/A | — |
| Episode 10 (August 16) | Carlinhos Brown | 6 | Maraia Takai | "I Know What You Did Last Summer" | Roberto Küster | N/A | — | — | — |
| Episode 10 (August 16) | Ivete Sangalo | 7 | Edson Carlos | "Apelido Carinhoso" | Larice Barreto | — | — | N/A | — |
| Episode 10 (August 16) | Carlinhos Brown | 8 | Rê Adegas | "Cara Valente" | Flávia Souza | N/A | — | — | — |
| Episode 10 (August 16) | Michel Teló | 9 | Dri | "Fuckin' Perfect" | Isa Guerra | ✔ | N/A | ✘ | ✔ |
| Episode 10 (August 16) | Lulu Santos | 10 | Cadu Duarte | "Feeling Good" | Ian Alone | — | — | — | N/A |
| Episode 10 (August 16) | Carlinhos Brown | 11 | Cristiane Santos | "Não é Fácil" | Mariá Pinkusfeld | N/A | — | ✔ | — |
| Episode 10 (August 16) | Michel Teló | 12 | Micaella Marinho | "Beat It" | Ally | — | N/A | Team full | — |
| Episode 11 (August 21) | Ivete Sangalo | 1 | Jennifer Rocha | "Signed, Sealed, Delivered I'm Yours" | Gika Bacci | ✘ | ✔ | Team full | ✔ |
| Episode 11 (August 21) | Lulu Santos | 2 | Tai Chiaro | "No Ponto" | Barbara Ferr | — | — | Team full | Team full |
| Episode 11 (August 21) | Carlinhos Brown | 3 | Helen Cristina | "Ficar Com Você" | Jamille Alves | N/A | — | Team full | Team full |
| Episode 11 (August 21) | Lulu Santos | 4 | Thailla Lima | "No Rancho Fundo" | Raissa Araújo | ✔ | — | Team full | Team full |
| Episode 11 (August 21) | Michel Teló | 5 | Renan Valentti | "Não Aprendi Dizer Adeus" | Indira Mel | Team full | N/A | Team full | Team full |
| Episode 11 (August 21) | Lulu Santos | 6 | Daniel Lopes | "Kiss Me" | Lucas Nage | Team full | — | Team full | Team full |
| Episode 11 (August 21) | Carlinhos Brown | 7 | Meggie Santos | "Mania de Você" | Gabriê | Team full | — | Team full | Team full |
| Episode 11 (August 21) | Lulu Santos | 8 | Dreicon | "There's Nothing Holdin' Me Back" | Arthur Henrique | Team full | ✔ | Team full | Team full |
| Episode 11 (August 21) | Ivete Sangalo | 9 | Flávia Gabê | "Ouvi Dizer" | Camila Pelegrina | Team full | Team full | Team full | Team full |
| Episode 11 (August 21) | Carlinhos Brown | 10 | David Nascimento | "Baby, I Love Your Way" | Guipson Pierre | Team full | Team full | Team full | Team full |
| Episode 11 (August 21) | Michel Teló | 11 | Lílian Menezes | "Madalena" | Carolina Lelis | Team full | Team full | Team full | Team full |
| Episode 11 (August 21) | Ivete Sangalo | 12 | Gisele Lira | "Who Knew" | Alícia Sá | Team full | Team full | Team full | Team full |
| Episode 11 (August 21) | Michel Teló | 13 | Léo Pain | "Você Mudou" | Marcio & Douglas | Team full | Team full | Team full | Team full |

== The Live Playoffs ==
| Episode | Coach | Order | Artist | Song | Result |
|---|---|---|---|---|---|
| Episode 12 (August 23) | Carlinhos Brown | 1 | LC Negão | "Anjos (Pra Quem Tem Fé)" | Eliminated |
| Episode 12 (August 23) | Carlinhos Brown | 2 | Lia Gondim | "Amor Perfeito" | Coach's choice |
| Episode 12 (August 23) | Carlinhos Brown | 3 | Maraia Takai | "I Will Survive" | Public's vote (37.57%) |
| Episode 12 (August 23) | Carlinhos Brown | 4 | Rê Adegas | "Ligia" | Coach's choice |
| Episode 12 (August 23) | Ivete Sangalo | 5 | Edson Carlos | "Muda de Vida" | Public's vote (51.10%) |
| Episode 12 (August 23) | Ivete Sangalo | 6 | Gisele Lira | "You Oughta Know" | Coach's choice |
| Episode 12 (August 23) | Ivete Sangalo | 7 | Kevin Ndjana | "Happy" | Coach's choice |
| Episode 12 (August 23) | Ivete Sangalo | 8 | Ramon Nascimento | "Drão" | Eliminated |
| Episode 12 (August 23) | Michel Teló | 9 | Isa Salles | "Blow Your Mind (Mwah)" | Eliminated |
| Episode 12 (August 23) | Michel Teló | 10 | Lais Yasmin | "Cabecinha no Ombro" | Coach's choice |
| Episode 12 (August 23) | Michel Teló | 11 | Morgana Rodrigues | "Amanheceu, Peguei a Viola" | Public's vote (44.78%) |
| Episode 12 (August 23) | Michel Teló | 12 | Renan Valentti | "Recaídas" | Coach's choice |
| Episode 12 (August 23) | Lulu Santos | 13 | Cadu Duarte | "Dancing On My Own" | Coach's choice |
| Episode 12 (August 23) | Lulu Santos | 14 | Daniel Lopes | "Sem Radar" | Eliminated |
| Episode 12 (August 23) | Lulu Santos | 15 | Giulia Sant'Ana | "Pensando Em Você" | Coach's choice |
| Episode 12 (August 23) | Lulu Santos | 16 | Priscila Tossan | "Negro Gato" | Public's vote (66.11%) |
| Episode 13 (August 28) | Ivete Sangalo | 1 | Alan Camargo | "I Feel It Coming" | Eliminated |
| Episode 13 (August 28) | Ivete Sangalo | 2 | Damiana Sadili | "Best Part" | Coach's choice |
| Episode 13 (August 28) | Ivete Sangalo | 3 | Flávia Gabê | "Falando Sério" | Public's vote (37.06%) |
| Episode 13 (August 28) | Ivete Sangalo | 4 | Júlia Dantas | "Serrado" | Coach's choice |
| Episode 13 (August 28) | Carlinhos Brown | 5 | David Nascimento | "These Days" | Coach's choice |
| Episode 13 (August 28) | Carlinhos Brown | 6 | Erica Natuza | "Rehab" | Public's vote (54.79%) |
| Episode 13 (August 28) | Carlinhos Brown | 7 | Helen Cristina | "Não Vou Ficar" | Coach's choice |
| Episode 13 (August 28) | Carlinhos Brown | 8 | Raissa Araújo | "Minha Festa" | Eliminated |
| Episode 13 (August 28) | Lulu Santos | 9 | Larissa Viana | "Who's Lovin' You" | Public's vote (44.72%) |
| Episode 13 (August 28) | Lulu Santos | 10 | Suelen Karine | "Nosso Nó(s)" | Coach's choice |
| Episode 13 (August 28) | Lulu Santos | 11 | Tai Chiaro | "Believe" | Coach's choice |
| Episode 13 (August 28) | Lulu Santos | 12 | Zack | "Nessas Horas" | Eliminated |
| Episode 13 (August 28) | Michel Teló | 13 | Arthur Henrique | "Desperdiçou" | Coach's choice |
| Episode 13 (August 28) | Michel Teló | 14 | Dri | "Whole Lotta Love" | Public's vote (39.23%) |
| Episode 13 (August 28) | Michel Teló | 15 | Leticia Gonçalves | "Loka" | Eliminated |
| Episode 13 (August 28) | Michel Teló | 16 | Micaella Marinho | "Oh Happy Day" | Coach's choice |
| Episode 14 (August 30) | Michel Teló | 1 | Andressa Hayalla | "Final de Tarde" | Coach's choice |
| Episode 14 (August 30) | Michel Teló | 2 | Kelvin Bruno | "Redemption Song" | Coach's choice |
| Episode 14 (August 30) | Michel Teló | 3 | Léo Pain | "Por Um Minuto" | Public's vote (70.34%) |
| Episode 14 (August 30) | Michel Teló | 4 | Lílian Menezes | "Feira de Mangaio" | Eliminated |
| Episode 14 (August 30) | Ivete Sangalo | 5 | Jennifer Rocha | "Sorry Not Sorry" | Coach's choice |
| Episode 14 (August 30) | Ivete Sangalo | 6 | Mariá Pinkusfeld | "Espumas ao Vento" | Eliminated |
| Episode 14 (August 30) | Ivete Sangalo | 7 | Marine Lima | "Stayin' Alive" | Public's vote (47.99%) |
| Episode 14 (August 30) | Ivete Sangalo | 8 | Tamires Braga | "Let's Stay Together" | Coach's choice |
| Episode 14 (August 30) | Carlinhos Brown | 9 | Cristiane Santos | "Ai, que Saudade d'Ocê" | Coach's choice |
| Episode 14 (August 30) | Carlinhos Brown | 10 | Meggie Santos | "À Francesa" | Eliminated |
| Episode 14 (August 30) | Carlinhos Brown | 11 | Murilo Bispo | "Lost Stars" | Public's vote (44.00%) |
| Episode 14 (August 30) | Carlinhos Brown | 12 | Nina Black | "O Nêgo do Cabelo Bom" | Coach's choice |
| Episode 14 (August 30) | Lulu Santos | 13 | Dreicon | "Lemonade" | Public's vote (45.34%) |
| Episode 14 (August 30) | Lulu Santos | 14 | Gika Bacci | "Chain of Fools" | Coach's choice |
| Episode 14 (August 30) | Lulu Santos | 15 | Isa Guerra | "12 Horas" | Coach's choice |
| Episode 14 (August 30) | Lulu Santos | 16 | Thailla Lima | "Medo Bobo" | Eliminated |

== Live shows ==
=== Elimination chart ===
Artist's info

- Artist from Team Brown
- Artist from Team Teló
- Artist from Team Ivete
- Artist from Team Lulu

Result details

- Artist was the winner
- Artist was runner-up
- Artist was saved by the fast pass
- Artist advanced on public's votes
- Artist was saved by coach
- Artist was stolen by coach
- Artist advanced to the final
- Artist was eliminated

Live show results per week
| Artist | Week 1 | | Week 2 | | Week 3 | | Week 4 | |
| Artist | Tuesday | Thursday | Monday | Thursday | Monday | Tuesday | Tuesday | Thursday |
|---|---|---|---|---|---|---|---|---|
| Léo Pain | | | Safe | Safe | Safe | Safe | Advanced | Winner |
| Kevin Ndjana | Safe | | | Safe | Safe | Safe | Advanced | Runner-up |
| Isa Guerra | | | Safe | Safe | Safe | Safe | Advanced | Runner-up |
| Erica Natuza | | Safe | | Safe | Safe | Safe | Advanced | Runner-up |
| Edson Carlos | Safe | | | Safe | Safe | Safe | Eliminated | Eliminated (week 4) |
| Lais Yasmin | Safe | | | Safe | Safe | Safe | Eliminated | Eliminated (week 4) |
| Murilo Bispo | | | Safe | Safe | Safe | Safe | Eliminated | Eliminated (week 4) |
| Priscila Tossan | Safe | | | Safe | Safe | Safe | Eliminated | Eliminated (week 4) |
| Arthur Henrique | | | Safe | Safe | Safe | Eliminated | Eliminated (week 3) | |
| David Nascimento | | Safe | | Safe | Safe | Eliminated | Eliminated (week 3) | |
| Dri | | Safe | | Safe | Safe | Eliminated | Eliminated (week 3) | |
| Marine Lima | | | Safe | Safe | Safe | Eliminated | Eliminated (week 3) | |
| Flávia Gabê | | Safe | | Safe | Eliminated | Eliminated (week 3) | | |
| Kelvin Bruno | | | Safe | Safe | Eliminated | Eliminated (week 3) | | |
| Micaella Marinho | | Safe | | Safe | Eliminated | Eliminated (week 3) | | |
| Morgana Rodrigues | Safe | | | Safe | Eliminated | Eliminated (week 3) | | |
| Andressa Hayalla | | Safe | | Eliminated | Eliminated (week 2) | | | |
| Renan Valentti | Safe | | | Eliminated | Eliminated (week 2) | | | |
| Cristiane Santos | | | Eliminated | Eliminated (week 2) | | | | |
| Dreicon | | | Eliminated | Eliminated (week 2) | | | | |
| Gika Bacci | | | Eliminated | Eliminated (week 2) | | | | |
| Helen Cristina | | | Eliminated | Eliminated (week 2) | | | | |
| Jennifer Rocha | | | Eliminated | Eliminated (week 2) | | | | |
| Júlia Dantas | | | Eliminated | Eliminated (week 2) | | | | |
| Cadu Duarte | | Eliminated | Eliminated (week 1) | | | | | |
| Damiana Sadili | | Eliminated | Eliminated (week 1) | | | | | |
| Larissa Viana | | Eliminated | Eliminated (week 1) | | | | | |
| Nina Black | | Eliminated | Eliminated (week 1) | | | | | |
| Suelen Karine | | Eliminated | Eliminated (week 1) | | | | | |
| Tamires Braga | | Eliminated | Eliminated (week 1) | | | | | |
| Gisele Lira | Eliminated | Eliminated (week 1) | | | | | | |
| Giulia Sant'Ana | Eliminated | Eliminated (week 1) | | | | | | |
| Lia Gondim | Eliminated | Eliminated (week 1) | | | | | | |
| Maraia Takai | Eliminated | Eliminated (week 1) | | | | | | |
| Rê Adegas | Eliminated | Eliminated (week 1) | | | | | | |
| Tai Chiaro | Eliminated | Eliminated (week 1) | | | | | | |

=== Week 1 ===
==== Live Coaches' Battle 1 ====
| Episode | Coach | Order | Artist | Song | Result |
Episode 15 (September 4)
| Episode 15 (September 4) | Lulu Santos | 1 | Priscila Tossan | "Chove Chuva" | Public's vote (62.75%) |
| Episode 15 (September 4) | Carlinhos Brown | 1 | Maraia Takai | "No Roots" | Eliminated |
| Episode 15 (September 4) | Carlinhos Brown | 2 | Rê Adegas | "Num Corpo Só" | Eliminated |
| Episode 15 (September 4) | Michel Teló | 2 | Lais Yasmin | "Always on My Mind" | Public's vote (71.27%) |
| Episode 15 (September 4) | Michel Teló | 3 | Renan Valentti | "Amo Noite e Dia" | Public's vote (50.50%) |
| Episode 15 (September 4) | Ivete Sangalo | 3 | Gisele Lira | "Dangerous Woman" | Eliminated |
| Episode 15 (September 4) | Ivete Sangalo | 4 | Edson Carlos | "Ar Condicionado no 15" | Public's vote (75.02%) |
| Episode 15 (September 4) | Lulu Santos | 4 | Giulia Sant'Ana | "Stay" | Eliminated |
| Episode 15 (September 4) | Ivete Sangalo | 5 | Kevin Ndjana | "A Lua Que Eu Te Dei" | Public's vote (86.72%) |
| Episode 15 (September 4) | Carlinhos Brown | 5 | Lia Gondim | "Magamalabares" | Eliminated |
| Episode 15 (September 4) | Lulu Santos | 6 | Tai Chiaro | "Linger" | Eliminated |
| Episode 15 (September 4) | Michel Teló | 6 | Morgana Rodrigues | "Ainda Ontem Chorei de Saudade" | Public's vote (69.60%) |

==== Live Coaches' Battle 2 ====
| Episode | Coach | Order | Artist | Song | Result |
Episode 16 (September 6)
| Episode 16 (September 6) | Lulu Santos | 1 | Larissa Viana | "Problemas" | Eliminated |
| Episode 16 (September 6) | Ivete Sangalo | 1 | Flávia Gabê | "Se Eu Não Te Amasse Tanto Assim" | Public's vote (58.98%) |
| Episode 16 (September 6) | Ivete Sangalo | 2 | Damiana Sadili | "Aviso aos Navegantes" | Eliminated |
| Episode 16 (September 6) | Michel Teló | 2 | Dri | "Roar" | Public's vote (72.67%) |
| Episode 16 (September 6) | Michel Teló | 3 | Andressa Hayalla | "Três Palavras" | Public's vote (69.85%) |
| Episode 16 (September 6) | Carlinhos Brown | 3 | Nina Black | "Sossego" | Eliminated |
| Episode 16 (September 6) | Carlinhos Brown | 4 | David Nascimento | "Caça e Caçador" | Public's vote (63.67%) |
| Episode 16 (September 6) | Lulu Santos | 4 | Cadu Duarte | "Pro Dia Nascer Feliz" | Eliminated |
| Episode 16 (September 6) | Ivete Sangalo | 5 | Tamires Braga | "We Don't Need Another Hero" | Eliminated |
| Episode 16 (September 6) | Michel Teló | 5 | Micaella Marinho | "Survivor" | Public's vote (60.49%) |
| Episode 16 (September 6) | Carlinhos Brown | 6 | Erica Natuza | "Can't Take My Eyes off You" | Public's vote (74.53%) |
| Episode 16 (September 6) | Lulu Santos | 6 | Suelen Karine | "Cheek to Cheek" | Eliminated |

=== Week 2 ===
==== Live Coaches' Battle 3 ====
| Episode | Coach | Order | Artist | Song | Result |
Episode 17 (September 10)
| Episode 17 (September 10) | Michel Teló | 1 | Kelvin Bruno | "Tuyo" | Public's vote (68.73%) |
| Episode 17 (September 10) | Carlinhos Brown | 1 | Helen Cristina | "Super Duper Love" | Eliminated |
| Episode 17 (September 10) | Carlinhos Brown | 2 | Cristiane Santos | "Sereia" | Eliminated |
| Episode 17 (September 10) | Ivete Sangalo | 2 | Marine Lima | "Cryin'" | Public's vote (55.58%) |
| Episode 17 (September 10) | Ivete Sangalo | 3 | Júlia Dantas | "Explode Coração" | Eliminated |
| Episode 17 (September 10) | Lulu Santos | 3 | Isa Guerra | "Hear Me Now" | Public's vote (56.93%) |
| Episode 17 (September 10) | Lulu Santos | 4 | Dreicon | "Ao Vivo e a Cores" | Eliminated |
| Episode 17 (September 10) | Michel Teló | 4 | Léo Pain | "Anti-Amor" | Public's vote (75.48%) |
| Episode 17 (September 10) | Lulu Santos | 5 | Gika Bacci | "Al Capone" | Eliminated |
| Episode 17 (September 10) | Carlinhos Brown | 5 | Murilo Bispo | "Tão Seu" | Public's vote (71.22%) |
| Episode 17 (September 10) | Ivete Sangalo | 6 | Jennifer Rocha | "Love on Top" | Eliminated |
| Episode 17 (September 10) | Michel Teló | 6 | Arthur Henrique | "Too Good at Goodbyes" | Public's vote (69.37%) |

==== Remix ====
Fast Passes
| Team Carlinhos Brown | Team Michel Teló | Team Ivete Sangalo | Team Lulu Santos |
| Erica Natuza | Dri | Edson Carlos | Priscila Tossan |

| Episode | Coach | Order | Artist | Song | Result |
Episode 18 (September 13)
| Episode 18 (September 13) | Michel Teló | 1 | Andressa Hayalla | "Fica" | Eliminated |
| Episode 18 (September 13) | Michel Teló | 2 | Arthur Henrique | "When We Were Young" | Stolen by Lulu |
| Episode 18 (September 13) | Carlinhos Brown | 3 | David Nascimento | "I'm Not the Only One" | Coach's choice |
| Episode 18 (September 13) | Ivete Sangalo | 4 | Flávia Gabê | "4 da Manhã" | Coach's choice |
| Episode 18 (September 13) | Lulu Santos | 5 | Isa Guerra | "Versace on the Floor" | Coach's choice |
| Episode 18 (September 13) | Michel Teló | 6 | Kelvin Bruno | "Elephant Gun" | Stolen by Brown |
| Episode 18 (September 13) | Ivete Sangalo | 7 | Kevin Ndjana | "That's What I Like" | Coach's choice |
| Episode 18 (September 13) | Michel Teló | 8 | Lais Yasmin | "Estrada da Vida" | Coach's choice |
| Episode 18 (September 13) | Michel Teló | 9 | Léo Pain | "Tão Feliz" | Coach's choice |
| Episode 18 (September 13) | Ivete Sangalo | 10 | Marine Lima | "Uma Noite e ½" | Coach's choice |
| Episode 18 (September 13) | Michel Teló | 11 | Micaella Marinho | "Rosa de Hiroshima" | Stolen by Lulu |
| Episode 18 (September 13) | Michel Teló | 12 | Morgana Rodrigues | "Chalana" | Coach's choice |
| Episode 18 (September 13) | Carlinhos Brown | 13 | Murilo Bispo | "Tão Bem" | Coach's choice |
| Episode 18 (September 13) | Michel Teló | 14 | Renan Valentti | "Galopeira" | Eliminated |

=== Week 3 ===
==== Round of 16 ====
| Episode | Coach | Order | Artist | Song | Result |
Episode 19 (September 17)
| Episode 19 (September 17) | Carlinhos Brown | 1 | David Nascimento | "Cada Um, Cada Um" | Coach's choice |
| Episode 19 (September 17) | Carlinhos Brown | 2 | Erica Natuza | "Eu Sei (Na Mira)" | Coach's choice |
| Episode 19 (September 17) | Carlinhos Brown | 3 | Kelvin Bruno | "Pra Você Dar o Nome" | Eliminated |
| Episode 19 (September 17) | Carlinhos Brown | 4 | Murilo Bispo | "Tempo Perdido" | Public's vote (34.71%) |
| Episode 19 (September 17) | Ivete Sangalo | 5 | Edson Carlos | "Olha Ela Aí" | Public's vote (43.36%) |
| Episode 19 (September 17) | Ivete Sangalo | 6 | Flávia Gabê | "Pés Cansados" | Eliminated |
| Episode 19 (September 17) | Ivete Sangalo | 7 | Kevin Ndjana | "Mina do Condomínio" | Coach's choice |
| Episode 19 (September 17) | Ivete Sangalo | 8 | Marine Lima | "Oh! Darling" | Coach's choice |
| Episode 19 (September 17) | Lulu Santos | 9 | Arthur Henrique | "Sua Cara" | Coach's choice |
| Episode 19 (September 17) | Lulu Santos | 10 | Isa Guerra | "Cancela o Sentimento" | Coach's choice |
| Episode 19 (September 17) | Lulu Santos | 11 | Micaella Marinho | "Vogue" | Eliminated |
| Episode 19 (September 17) | Lulu Santos | 12 | Priscila Tossan | "Eu Sei Que Vou Te Amar" | Public's vote (50.31%) |
| Episode 19 (September 17) | Michel Teló | 13 | Dri | "Bad Romance" | Coach's choice |
| Episode 19 (September 17) | Michel Teló | 14 | Lais Yasmin | "Stand by Me" | Coach's choice |
| Episode 19 (September 17) | Michel Teló | 15 | Léo Pain | "Maus Bocados" | Public's vote (54.05%) |
| Episode 19 (September 17) | Michel Teló | 16 | Morgana Rodrigues | "Fio de Cabelo" | Eliminated |

==== Quarterfinals ====
| Episode | Coach | Order | Artist | Song | Result |
Episode 20 (September 18)
| Episode 20 (September 18) | Ivete Sangalo | 1 | Edson Carlos | "No Dia Em Que Eu Saí de Casa" | Coach's choice |
| Episode 20 (September 18) | Ivete Sangalo | 2 | Kevin Ndjana | "Chandelier" | Public's vote (41.30%) |
| Episode 20 (September 18) | Ivete Sangalo | 3 | Marine Lima | "Máscara" | Eliminated |
| Episode 20 (September 18) | Michel Teló | 4 | Dri | "Metamorfose Ambulante" | Eliminated |
| Episode 20 (September 18) | Michel Teló | 5 | Lais Yasmin | "Sailing" | Coach's choice |
| Episode 20 (September 18) | Michel Teló | 6 | Léo Pain | "La Barca" | Public's vote (53.39%) |
| Episode 20 (September 18) | Carlinhos Brown | 7 | David Nascimento | "O Vento" | Eliminated |
| Episode 20 (September 18) | Carlinhos Brown | 8 | Erica Natuza | "Caso Sério" | Coach's choice |
| Episode 20 (September 18) | Carlinhos Brown | 9 | Murilo Bispo | "With or Without You" | Public's vote (46.18%) |
| Episode 20 (September 18) | Lulu Santos | 10 | Arthur Henrique | "Agora Eu Quero Ir" | Eliminated |
| Episode 20 (September 18) | Lulu Santos | 11 | Isa Guerra | "Paga de Solteiro Feliz" | Coach's choice |
| Episode 20 (September 18) | Lulu Santos | 12 | Priscila Tossan | "O Sapo" | Public's vote (56.66%) |

=== Week 4 ===
==== Semifinals ====
| Episode | Coach | Order | Artist | Song | Result | | |
| Episode | Coach | Order | Artist | Song | Public points | Coach points | Total points |
Episode 21 (September 25)
| Episode 21 (September 25) | Lulu Santos | 1 | Isa Guerra | "É Com Ela Que Eu Estou" | 63.33 | 00.00 | 63.33 |
| Episode 21 (September 25) | Lulu Santos | 2 | Priscila Tossan | "Bom Senso" | 36.67 | 20.00 | 56.67 |
| Episode 21 (September 25) | Ivete Sangalo | 3 | Edson Carlos | "É o Amor" | 37.67 | 00.00 | 37.67 |
| Episode 21 (September 25) | Ivete Sangalo | 4 | Kevin Ndjana | "Billie Jean" | 62.33 | 20.00 | 82.33 |
| Episode 21 (September 25) | Carlinhos Brown | 5 | Erica Natuza | "Nada Por Mim" | 42.23 | 20.00 | 62.23 |
| Episode 21 (September 25) | Carlinhos Brown | 6 | Murilo Bispo | "Segredos" | 57.77 | 00.00 | 57.77 |
| Episode 21 (September 25) | Michel Teló | 7 | Lais Yasmin | "Let It Be" | 34.29 | 00.00 | 34.29 |
| Episode 21 (September 25) | Michel Teló | 8 | Léo Pain | "A Hora É Agora" | 65.71 | 20.00 | 85.71 |

==== Finals ====
| Episode | Coach | Artist | Order | Song | Order | Song | Result |
Episode 22 (September 27)
| Episode 22 (September 27) | Michel Teló | Léo Pain | 4 | "Adoro Amar Você" | 8 | "Outra Vez" | Winner (50.01%) |
| Episode 22 (September 27) | Carlinhos Brown | Erica Natuza | 1 | "Anunciação" | 5 | "How Deep Is Your Love" | Runner-up |
| Episode 22 (September 27) | Lulu Santos | Isa Guerra | 2 | "My Life Is Going On" | 6 | "O Céu Já Escolheu" | Runner-up |
| Episode 22 (September 27) | Ivete Sangalo | Kevin Ndjana | 3 | "I Got You (I Feel Good)" | 7 | "Ainda Bem" | Runner-up |

== Ratings and reception ==
=== Brazilian ratings ===
All numbers are in points and provided by Kantar Ibope Media.

| Episode | Title | Air date | Timeslot (BRT) | SP viewers (in points) | BR viewers (in points) | Source |
|---|---|---|---|---|---|---|
| 1 | The Blind Auditions 1 | July 17, 2018 | Tuesday 10:30 p.m. | 22.0 | 24.6 | |
| 2 | The Blind Auditions 2 | July 19, 2018 | Thursday 10:30 p.m. | 25.8 | 24.6 | |
| 3 | The Blind Auditions 3 | July 24, 2018 | Tuesday 10:30 p.m. | 23.1 | 25.3 | |
| 4 | The Blind Auditions 4 | July 26, 2018 | Thursday 10:30 p.m. | 23.5 | 25.3 | |
| 5 | The Blind Auditions 5 | July 31, 2018 | Tuesday 10:30 p.m. | 24.6 | 25.5 | |
| 6 | The Blind Auditions 6 | August 2, 2018 | Thursday 10:30 p.m. | 25.9 | 25.5 | |
| 7 | The Blind Auditions 7 | August 7, 2018 | Tuesday 10:30 p.m. | 24.7 | 24.7 | |
| 8 | The Blind Auditions 8 | August 9, 2018 | Thursday 10:30 p.m. | 23.9 | 24.7 | |
| 9 | The Battles 1 | August 14, 2018 | Tuesday 10:30 p.m. | 25.1 | 24.8 | |
| 10 | The Battles 2 | August 16, 2018 | Thursday 10:30 p.m. | 23.9 | 24.8 | |
| 11 | The Battles 3 | August 21, 2018 | Tuesday 10:30 p.m. | 22.6 | 24.8 | |
| 12 | The Playoffs 1 | August 23, 2018 | Thursday 10:30 p.m. | 25.4 | 24.8 | |
| 13 | The Playoffs 2 | August 28, 2018 | Tuesday 10:30 p.m. | 23.6 | 23.9 | |
| 14 | The Playoffs 3 | August 30, 2018 | Thursday 10:30 p.m. | 23.9 | 23.9 | |
| 15 | Live Coaches' Battle 1 | September 4, 2018 | Tuesday 10:30 p.m. | 23.7 | 22.5 | |
| 16 | Live Coaches' Battle 2 | September 6, 2018 | Thursday 11:30 p.m.^{1} | 23.4 | 22.5 | |
| 17 | Live Coaches' Battle 3 | September 10, 2018 | Monday 10:30 p.m.^{2} | 22.7 | 22.6 | |
| 18 | Remix | September 13, 2018 | Thursday 10:30 p.m. | 23.1 | 22.6 | |
| 19 | Round of 16 | September 17, 2018 | Monday 10:30 p.m.^{3} | 22.5 | 23.0 | |
| 20 | Quarterfinals | September 18, 2018 | Tuesday 10:30 p.m.^{3} | 22.3 | 23.0 | |
| 21 | Semifinals | September 25, 2018 | Tuesday 10:30 p.m. | 21.5 | 23.4 | |
| 22 | Finals | September 27, 2018 | Thursday 10:30 p.m. | 23.2 | 23.4 | |

- ^Note 1: Episode 16 was delayed to 11:30 PM BRT (10:30 PM AMT).
- ^Note 2: Episode 17 aired on Monday due to the Brazil vs. El Salvador friendly match on Tuesday.
- ^Note 3: Episodes 19 and 20 aired on Monday and Tuesday due to the Colo-Colo vs. Palmeiras quarterfinal match for the 2018 Copa Libertadores on Thursday.
- In 2018, each point represents 248.647 households in 15 market cities in Brazil (71.855 households in São Paulo)
