= Cidinha da Silva =

Brazilian writer (born 1967)

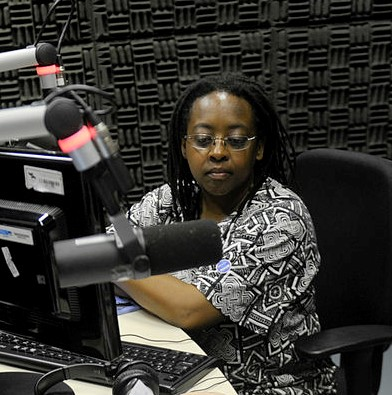
- Born: Maria Aparecida da Silva; 1967 (age 58–59); Belo Horizonte, Minas Gerais, Brazil
- Education: Federal University of Minas Gerais
- Occupation: Writer

Maria Aparecida da Silva, better known as Cidinha da Silva (born 1967), is a Brazilian writer.

Silva was born in 1967 in Belo Horizonte. She graduated with a degree in history from the Federal University of Minas Gerais. She was the president of Geledés - Black Women's Institute and founded the Instituto Kuanza, which promotes actions on education, affirmative action and promove ações de educação, ações afirmativas e community integration of the Black population. She was the manager of cultural activities with the Palmares Cultural Foundation.

She collaborated with Luiz Fernando Carvalho to develop the series IndependênciaS. She wrote the song "Lençóis" for Luedji Luna's 2020 album Bom Mesmo É Estar Debaixo D'Água, which was nominated for a Latin Grammy.

== Works ==
=== Stories ===
- Você me deixe, viu? Eu vou bater meu tambor! Belo Horizonte: Mazza Edições, 2008.
- Um Exu em Nova York. Rio de Janeiro: Pallas Editora, 2018.

=== Chronicles ===
- Cada Tridente em seu lugar e outras crônicas. São Paulo: Instituto Kuanza, 2006. 2. ed., rev. Belo Horizonte: Mazza Edições, 2007.
- Oh margem! reinventa os rios! São Paulo: Selo Povo, 2011.
- Racismo no Brasil e afetos correlatos. Porto alegre: Conversê Edições, 2013.
- Baú de miudezas, sol e chuva. Belo Horizonte: Mazza, 2014.
- Sobre-viventes. Rio de Janeiro: Pallas, 2016.
- Parem de nos matar! São Paulo: Editora Ijumaa, 2016.

=== Children's ===
- Os nove pentes d´África. Belo Horizonte: Mazza Edições, 2009.
- Mar de Manu. São Paulo: Kuanza Produções, 2011.
- Kuami. Belo Horizonte: Nandyala, 2011.

=== Poems ===
- Canções de amor e dengo. São Paulo: Edições Me Parió Revolução, 2016.

=== Theatre ===
- Engravidei, pari cavalos e aprendi a voar sem asas, grupo Os Crespos, 2013.
- Os coloridos, grupo Os Crespos, 2015.

=== Organization ===
- Ações Afirmativas em Educação: experiências brasileiras. São Paulo: Summus/Selo Negro, 2003.
- Africanidades e relações raciais: insumos para políticas públicas na área do livro, leitura, literatura e bibliotecas no Brasil. Brasília: Fundação Cultural Palmares, 2014.
