= IndependênciaS =

Brazilian television miniseries

- Also known as: IndependênciaS
- Created by: Luiz Fernando Carvalho
- Developed by: Luís Alberto de Abreu; Luiz Fernando Carvalho
- Story by: Alex Moletta; Paulo Garfunkel; Melina Dalboni
- Directed by: Luiz Fernando Carvalho
- Starring: Antônio Fagundes; Daniel de Oliveira; Isabél Zuaa; Alana Ayoká; Ilana Kaplan
- Composers: Tim Rescala; Tiganá Santana; Master San
- Country of origin: Brazil
- Original language: Portuguese
- No. of episodes: 16

Production
- Producer: Enéas Carlos Pereira

Original release
- Network: TV Cultura
- Release: September 7 – December 21, 2022

IndependênciaS was a Brazilian drama series in 16 episodes, produced and aired by TV Cultura every Wednesday at 10 p.m. and repeated at the same time on Sundays, in the period from September 7 to December 21, 2022.

Written by Luis Alberto de Abreu, it was developed by director, film-maker, Luiz Fernando Carvalho, and responsibility for its script was also shared among Alex Moletta, Paulo Garfunkel and Melina Dalboni with the collaboration of Kaká Werá, Ynaê Lopes dos Santos, Cidinha da Silva and Tiganá Santana. The idea for the project had arisen on TV Cultura from an initial research conducted by journalist, José Antonio Severo.

The series was premiered to coincide with Brazil's Bicentennial Day, making a contemporary rereading of the facts of the country's history in the 19th century, from the escape of the Portuguese royal family to Brazil in 1808 to the death of Pedro I of Brazil, in 1834, in Portugal.

It is another partnership between Luiz Fernando Carvalho and playwright, Luís Alberto de Abreu, with whom the film-maker had already performed the mini-series Today is Maria's Day (Hoje É Dia de Maria), 'Capitu' and Stone of the Kingdom (A Pedra do Reino). The cast comprises a blend of renowned actors, such as Antonio Fagundes, Daniel de Oliveira, Isabel Zuaa, Gabriel Leone, Ilana Kaplan, André Frateschi, Celso Frateschi, Cassio Scapin, Rafael Cortez, Walderez de Barros and Maria Fernanda Candido, and newcomers, such as Alana Ayoká, Marcela Vivan, Veronia Mucúna, Jamila Cazumbá and Ywy'zar Guajajara.

The premise of the series was the need to review the representation of historical processes, such as the Independence or Death painting, considered the most consecrated, widespread representation of Brazil's moment of independence. Referring to the portrait of Pedro Américo, director, Luiz Fernando Carvalho wrote, "It all seems false, a kind of fake news of the time, imperialist and exclusionary. We wondered: Where are the women? What happened to Maria Felipa, Leopoldina, Maria Quiteria and martyrs like Soror Joana Angélica, José Bonifácio, Frei Caneca and Chaguinhas? And other people too, anonymous heroes of so many popular uprisings? Where's Marisqueiras de Itaparica".

== Plot ==
The starting point is 1808, marked by two distinct Atlantic crossings: African slaves disembark in Brazil. Prince Regent Dom João VI and his family take refuge in Rio de Janeiro in the face of the threat represented by Napoleon Bonaparte. The colony is transformed, reconstructed by slave labor. The intimacy between the elite, the slave traders and the Court is revealed. In the following years, there is an outbreak of violence against the indigenous population. Revolts led by anonymous heroes, students and progressive politicians shake the monarchy. Shouts of resistance from other corners of the country oppose the official clamor for independence uttered by a hesitant Dom Pedro I in 1822. Uprisings, scattered across the country, contribute to the Independence movement, their leaders being characters previously erased: Maria Felipa, Frei Caneca, Chaguinhas, Gonçalves Ledo, Antonio Carlos Andrada and Maria Quitéria.

== Production ==
As a result of the collaborative creative process that extended from July 2021 to May 2022, encompassing research, creation, writing, preparation and realization, the series was fully filmed in Luiz Fernando Carvalho's studio in Vila Leopoldina, where the rehearsals had also been held.

The preparation of the cast began with practical and theoretical workshops, with the poet, essayist, teacher and playwright, Leda Maria Martins, historians, Ynaê Lopes dos Santos and Lilia Schwarcz, psychoanalyst, Maria Rita Kehl, and Jaqueline Côelho.

The recordings of the series, which had taken 70 days, were completed in May, located in the same oval studio - called the "Cosmograma" by the director - where the actors had rehearsed their roles. Alexandre Herchcovitch designed the costumes for the series, working in the same studio set in the director's creative unit.

The experimental and hybrid language of the work involved several narrative vocabularies. The narration that structures the whole story is the voice of the character Pilgrim (Isabel Zuaa) speaking in Kimbundu. The African matrix tongue translated in the Portuguese subtitles was performed by Professor Niyi Monanzambi (UFBA). The indigenous dialogues were created by writer Kaka Werá Djecupi in Tupi-Guarani, and recreated by indigenous actress Zahy Guajajara, who translated into Ze'eng Eté, a derivation of Tupi spoken by the Guajajara ethnicity. Brian Hazlehurst translated the dialogues in certain scenes into "olde" English, and enhanced the pronunciation of the respective actors.

== Cast ==
Actor/Actress	Character
Antônio Fagundes	Dom João VI
Daniel de Oliveira	Pedro I of Brazil
Isabél Zuaa	Peregrina
Alana Ayoká	Young Peregrina
Ilana Kaplan	Carlota Joaquina
Louisa Sexton	Maria Leopoldina of Austria
Gabriel Leone	Miguel I of Portugal
Walderez de Barros	Maria I of Portugal
Celso Frateschi	José Bonifácio de Andrada e Silva
André Frateschi	Francisco Gomes da Silva (Chalaça)
Cassio Scapin	Plácido de Abreu
Marcela Vivan	Domitila
Dani Ornellas	Osória
Zahy Guajajara	Inaiá
Ywy'zar Guajajara	Cyara
Verônia Mucúna	Maria Felipa
Maria Fernanda Cândido	Maria Graham
Katia Daher	Isobel
Carol Brada	Marquesa de Aguiar
Marat Descartes	Francisco José Rufino de Sousa Lobato
José Renato Forner	Martim Francisco Andrada
Sergio Siviero	Antonio Carlos Andrada
Flávio Tolezani	Gonçalves Ledo
Wilson Rabelo	Priest José Maurício Nunes Garcia
Rafael Cortez	Marquês de Marialva
Cacá Carvalho	Barão
Renato Borghi	Paulo Fernandes Viana
Pedro Paulo Rangel	Librarian
Luís Mármora	Elias António Lopes
Rogério Brito	Paulino
Léa Garcia	Osória´s mother
Ermi Panzo	Holufema
Juliana Sanches	Maria Quitéria
Simone Makhamra	Joana Angélica
Júlio Silvério	Chaguinhas
Plínio Soares	Father Antônio
Alli Willow	Noemy
Bruna Miglioranza	Benedita de Castro Canto e Melo
Odilon Esteves	Francisco de Castro do Canto e Melo
Tay Lopez	Frei Caneca
Marcelo Andrade	Miguel Nunes Vidigal
Fafá de Belém	Madame Corneta
Margareth Menezes	Engrácia
Dárcio de Oliveira	Francisco Montezuma
Jussara Freire	Farmer

== Reception ==
The difference that immediately strikes the viewer, right in the first episode, is the restitution of the role of African and indigenous matrixes in the constitution of Brazil's multifaceted identity. His visual excess and antinaturalism, style marks, have won Luiz Fernando Carvalho a distinct place on TV. Now he takes a broader sweep, confronting the viewer with a country of extremes, admired for its boundless imagination, but, at the same time, incapable of seeing itself

— Carta Capital, by Cássio Starling Carlos

The series was well received by critics. For Estado de S. Paulo critic, Ubiratan Brasil, the series is a "program that will make history. It is certainly one of the best productions of the year."

According to the philosopher, sociologist and regional director of Sesc-SP, Danilo Santos de Miranda, the first episode "left us all impacted by the sheer artistic beauty and the much-needed fresh approach to this chapter of our history."

Folha de S. Paulo journalist, Naief Haddad wrote: "the originality from a visual and narrative point of view, which characterizes Carvalho's works, is another mark of the series.(...) In the 200 years since the Cry of Ipiranga, an unusual and fallible emperor is silenced, without the hero pose eternalized in the portrait of Pedro Américo."

In the article by critic, Rodrigo Fonseca, "The first episode (...) is synesthetic splendor, mixing file images of villages, photos, paintings and a stunning performance by Ilana Kaplan as Carlota Joaquina. In its dramaturgy (simultaneously baroque and pop), this opening chapter focuses on a cartography of human indignity imposed on peoples from Latin Pangeia and the enslaved Africans. It is a kind of "La Chinoise" (1967), with the entire semiotics of Godard, yesterday and today."

For director, Gabriel Priolli, "IndependênciaS is light years ahead of the unambitious aesthetics of the current soap operas, and even Brazilian series, which are supposed to be an evolution of the progenitor. It is not an entertainment product. Rather, it's a work of art."
