= François Muleka =

- Born: Francisco Modesto Muleka Ngoy; 22 March 1985 (age 41)
- Origin: São Paulo, Brazil
- Genres: MPB; Romantic music
- Occupations: Singer, composer, multi-instrumentalist
- Years active: 2008—present

François Muleka, the artistic name of Francisco Modesto Muleka Ngoy (born 22 March 1985) is a Brazilian singer, composer, and multi-instrumentalist of Congolese origin. He has released various self-penned albums and in 2017, his work, "Notícias de Salvador", coauthored with his sister Marissol Mwaba, became known after being sung by Luedji Luna.

== Biography ==
Muleka was born on 22 March 1985, the son of immigrants from the Democratic Republic of the Congo who made music in Brazil in Portuguese and other languages for everyone. Their influences are diverse and with more diverse verses, including from an eclectic panorama from the north to the south of Africa, as well as famous songs from telenovelas in the 90s. Along with his solo career, he developed partnerships with musicians from the music scene in the state of Santa Catarina, including the participation of his sister, Marissol Mwaba, along with Dandara Manoela and other artists.

Muleka's debut album was "Karibu", based on the name of the trio between him, Mwaba and Manoela. It was released at the end of 2012 and includes guest participations from their friends. He was later quoted as saying "The things that we had discovered in it, we applied to "Feijão e Sonho". We better defined the roles on the album, we aggregated more people to play and to compose the graphic material. The idea is that for every new work, we would be able to learn to lead with these things from the musical world post-composition."

Muleka is a free-style artist adept to various languages and who performs as a visual artist, singer, composer, and multi-instrumentalist, having released the albums Karibu (2013), with Trio Karibu, Feijão e Sonho (2015), Caruagem (2018), Fauno Aflora (2016), and Algorítmico (2021); along with having directed works by artists such as his sister Marissol and Ipomea Urutau. The artist also released an EP, Ovo, and a single, Desempenho, in 2020. Beyond those works, Muleka has collaborated with various artists, that, according to him, always came about from affectio and included a guest appearance by Chico César in an album, as well as guitar arrangements in Luedji Luna's debut album, Um Corpo no Mundo, in 2017. Along with this, he took part in the track "Notícias de Salvador" by Luna, which he co-authored with his sister Marissol. This would be followed by the 2020 album Bom Mesmo É Estar Debaixo D'Água, the result of a collaboration between Luna and Muleka. He wrote several songs on the album, including "Chororô" and the titular "Bom Mesmo É Estar Debaixo D'Água".

In 2018, he created the Psicodelicado exposition, which contains visual puns in India ink and portraits that reveal zones of tension buried between diverse levels of the reading of interspliced images, in which they highlight figures that are called "people on the wall". The electric bass is his most beloved instrument and he has taken it to various prestigious events such as Mostra Cantautores and Rock in Rio.

Muleka has also collaborated with various artists on stage such as Alpha Petulay, Alegre Corrêa, Filó Machado, O Teatro Mágico, Luciana Mello, Paulo Calasans, and Ana Paula da Silva, among others. He is also dedicated to managing offices dedicated to approaching creative processes.

== Discography ==
=== Albums ===
Year	Title
2015	Feijão e Sonho
2016	Fauno Aflora
2018	Caruagem
2021	Agorítimico

=== Singles/EPs ===
Year	Title
2020	Ovo
2020	Desempenho

=== Video clips ===
Year	Title
2014	Entrando no País das Maravilhas (REC'n'Play)
2014	Clarear-Me (Sofar Florianópolis)
2014	Desempenho
