= Catanduvas =

Catanduvas may refer to:

- Catanduvas, Paraná, city in the Brazilian state of Paraná
- Catanduvas, Santa Catarina, city in the Brazilian state of Santa Catarina

== See also ==
- Catanduva, a municipality in the state of São Paulo, Brazil
