= The Zawinul Syndicate =

Jazz fusion band

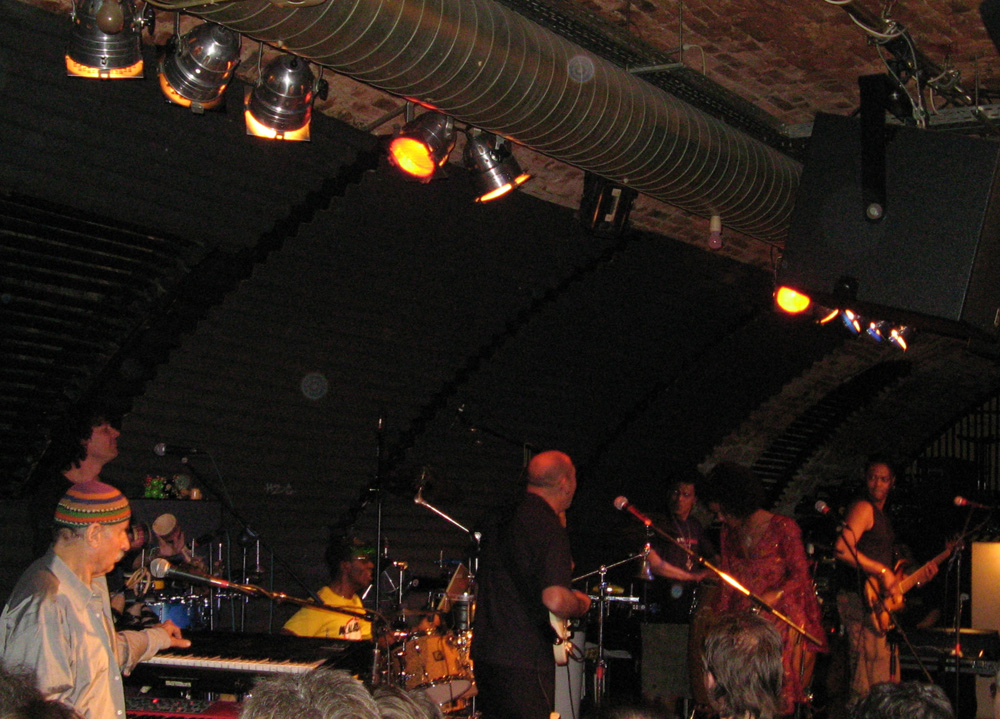
- The Zawinul Syndicate performing in 2007

Background information
- Also known as: The Syndicate
- Genre: Jazz fusion
- Years active: 1988–2007
- Spinoff of: Weather Report
- Past members: Joe Zawinul

The Zawinul Syndicate was a jazz fusion band formed by the Austrian keyboardist Joe Zawinul in 1988 that included a rotating cast of musicians. It evolved out of Zawinul's previous band, Weather Report. Their style was a combination of groove-oriented jazz and world music. Zawinul himself stated that he gave the band its name due to a syndicate bearing more resemblance to a family than "just" a band.

The ensemble released its debut album, The Immigrants, the same year it was formed. It featured Abraham Laboriel on bass, Cornell Rochester on drums, and Scott Henderson on guitar. Following the recording, the Syndicate took on Gerald Veasley as its bassist as well as Muyungo Jackson and Lynne Fiddmont on percussion.

The group's second album, Black Water, came out in 1989, after which Bill Summers took over from Jackson on percussion and was himself later replaced by Robert Thomas Jr.

The Zawinul Syndicate's third studio album, Lost Tribes, was released in 1992 and featured Mike Baker on drums and Randy Bernsen on guitar. Carl Anderson and Leata Galloway subsequently sang with the band on tour, and Mark Ledford contributed on trumpet. The live albums World Tour and Vienna Nights came out in 1998 and 2005, respectively.

Other musicians who have played with the Syndicate include Paco Sery, Matt Garrison, Arto Tunçboyacıyan, Richard Bona, Victor Bailey, Manolo Badrena, Karim Ziad, Alegre Corrêa, and Aziz Sahmaoui.

After Zawinul's death in 2007, several members of the Syndicate, including Sery, Sahmaoui, Corrêa, and Jorge Bezerra, decided to perform his music live under the shortened name the Syndicate. The group has since included the French saxophonist Émile Parisien, among others. The live album 75, recorded prior to Zawinul's death, came out in 2008.

== Discography ==
- The Immigrants (1988)
- Black Water (1989)
- Lost Tribes (1992)
- World Tour (live, 1998)
- Vienna Nights (live, 2005)
- 75 (live, 2008)
