= Rubel (singer) =

Brazilian singer-songwriter (born 1991)

- Born: Rubel Brisolla; 1991 (age 34–35); Volta Redonda, Rio de Janeiro, Brazil
- Genres: MPB; folk-pop
- Occupations: Singer, songwriter, screenwriter, director
- Instruments: Vocals, guitar
- Years active: 2013–present
- Label: Dorileo

Rubel Brisolla (born 1991) is a Brazilian singer, songwriter, screenwriter, and director. In 2018, his album Casas was nominated for a Latin Grammy in the Best Portuguese Language Rock or Alternative Album category, and in 2023 the album As Palavras, Vol. 1 & 2 was also nominated for a Latin Grammy in the Best Portuguese Language Contemporary Pop Album category.

== Biography and career ==
Rubel Brisolla was born in Volta Redonda, Rio de Janeiro. At the age of seven, Rubel moved with his family to the city of Rio de Janeiro. While in high school, he was in a band called A Corleones, with a musical style similar to alternative rock. He set music aside when he went to study Cinema at the Pontifical Catholic University of Rio de Janeiro.

In 2011, Rubel went on an exchange program in Austin, Texas, to study Cinema at the University of Texas at Austin, and during that period he began writing his first songs. In 2013, he released his first work, titled Pearl. His song "Quando Bate Aquela Saudade" became a hit on the internet, earning a music video directed by Rubel himself. In March 2018, the album Casas was released, with collaborations from Emicida and Rincon Sapiência. The song "Partilhar" was included in the soundtrack of the telenovela Malhação: Vidas Brasileiras, and the song "Quando Bate Aquela Saudade" was included in the soundtrack of the telenovela Onde Nascem os Fortes.

In September 2018, the album Casas received a Latin Grammy nomination in the Best Portuguese Language Rock or Alternative Album category. The album was also voted the 20th best Brazilian album of 2018 by Rolling Stone Brasil magazine. On March 3, 2023, he released As Palavras, Vol. 1 & 2, which was chosen by the São Paulo Association of Art Critics as one of the 50 best Brazilian albums of 2023. In the same year, the album was also nominated for the 2023 Latin Grammy in the Best Portuguese Language Contemporary Pop Album category.

On May 28, 2025, he released his fourth album, Beleza. Mas agora a gente faz o que com isso?.

In 2023, Rubel began writing scripts for and participating in the Disney+ series Tá Tudo Certo, alongside other young MPB artists. He also took part in writing scripts for the programs Mister Brau, on TV Globo, and Lady Night, on Multishow. He also directed his own music videos for the songs "Quando Bate Aquela Saudade," "Partilhar," "Ben," "Colégio," and "Chiste."

== Discography ==
=== Studio albums ===
- Pearl (2013)
- Casas (2018)
- As Palavras, Vol.1 & 2 (2023)
- Beleza. Mas agora a gente faz o que com isso? (2025)

=== Singles ===
==== As lead artist ====
- "Quando Bate Aquela Saudade" (2013)
- "Quando Bate Aquela Saudade" (re-release; 2015)
- "O Velho e o Mar" (2016)
- "Ben" (2017)
- "Chiste" (with Rincon Sapiência; 2018)
- "Colégio" (2018)
- "Só Pra Te Mostrar" (2019)
- "Partilhar" (with Anavitória; 2019)
- "Você Me Pergunta" (2020)
- "O Homem da Injeção II" (2021)

==== As guest artist ====
- "Na Contramão" (Pedro Luís feat. Rubel; 2019)
- "Pra Bem Perto de Mim" (Gui Held feat. Rubel; 2021)
