= Tatiana Nascimento =

Brazilian writer (born 1981)

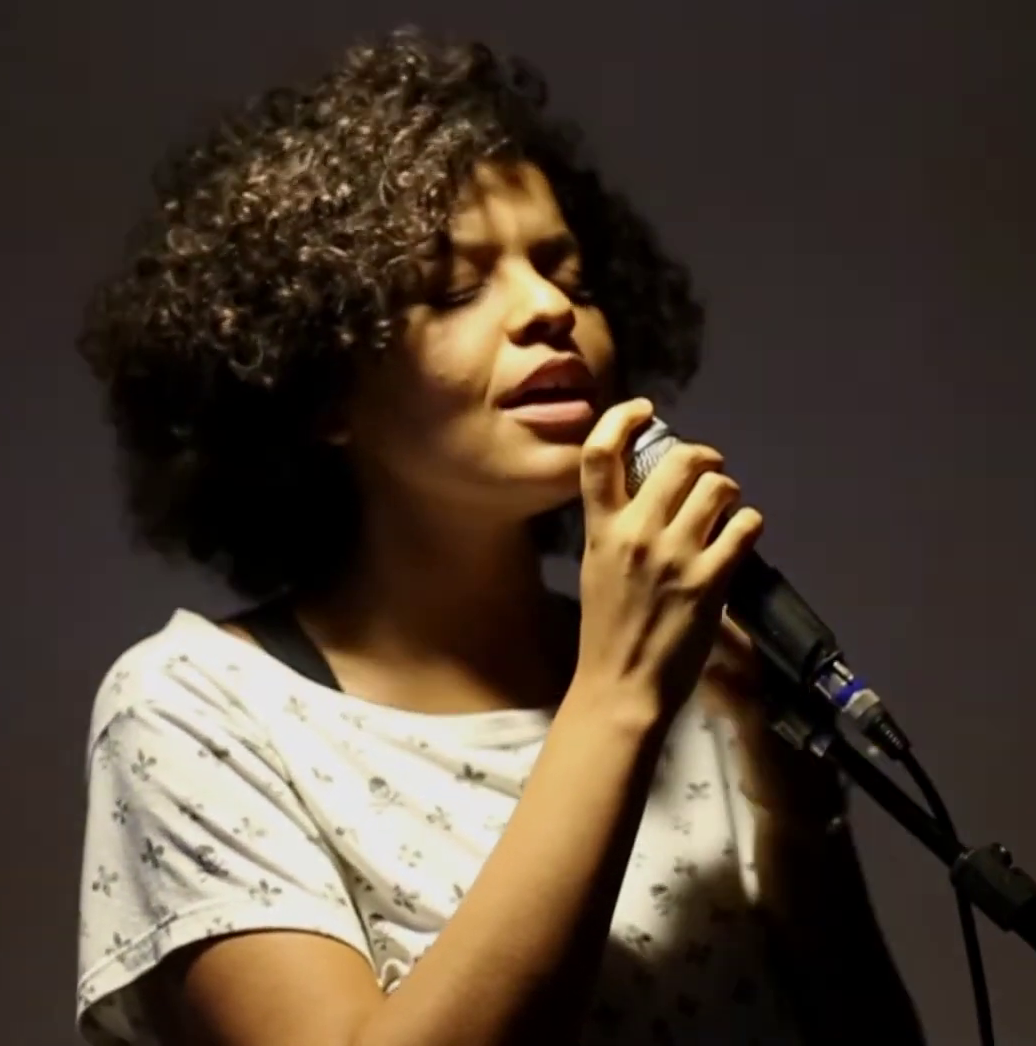
- Nascimento in 2017
- Born: 1981 (age 44–45); Brasília, Brazil
- Education: University of Brasília (BA); Federal University of Santa Catarina (PhD)
- Occupations: Writer, translator, singer, poet, slammer, composer

Tatiana Nascimento (born 1981) is a Brazilian writer, translator, singer, poet, slammer, and composer. She writes, investigates and publishes books by Black and LGBT+ authors. She was one of the people who idealized and cofounded the publisher padê editora. She was a finalist of the Jabuti prize of poetry in 2022 with the book Palavra Preta (2021). She won the Pallas Award for Literature in 2024, being awarded for her 18th book and first romance, Água de maré (2025).

Her book lundu was one of the publications selected by the Projeto Nacional Leia Mulheres for their Best Books of 2016 category. It was also published in an experimental audiovisual format.

She is the creator of the concept of "cuírlombismo" literature (also written as "cuíerlombismo" or "kuírlombismo"), to which she proposes the term as a reimagining of sexual dissidence as a foundational part of the ancestral imagination of the Black diaspora, as well as a new interpretive parameter of artistic productions made by Black LGBT+ people. This is made simultaneously from and as part of a rupture with the paradigm of pain/resistance/denunciation that points to the canon of literary criticism/theory as foundational to Black Brazilian literature.

== Biography ==
Nascimento was born in 1981 in Brasília. She graduated with a degree in Portuguese from the University of Brasília (UnB). In 2014, she earned a doctorate in translation studies from the Federal University of Santa Catarina (UFSC), with the thesis Letramento e tradução no espelho de Oxum: teoria lésbica negra em auto/re/conhecimentos, under the advisory of Luciana Rassier. Nascimento is non-binary.

In 2015, she co-founded, with Bárbara Ismenia, padê editorial, a collective publisher dedicated to the publication of artisanal books by Black authors and/or by lesbian, travesti, transgender, and bisexual authors.

That same year, Nascimento idealized, cofounded (with Valéria Matos), and produced Slam das Minas in Brasília. This was the first poetry slam exclusively for women and lesbians in Brazil, which also became an activist movement. In 2017, she cofounded Palavra Preta – Mostra Nacional de Negras Autoras, which is held annually. This show came from an invite by singer Luedji Luna and was named after the poetry "palavra preta", which Nascimento had written at beginning in 2015. The first edition of the Mostra Palavra Preta, in Salvador, had more than 300 people participating in the first three days of the show. The second edition in 2018 was held at the Festival Latinidades in Brasília, and had the participation of Kati Souto, Nina Ferreira, and Jorge Maravilha.

In 2018, Nascimento coordinated the LGBT poetry studio Do dever de sofrer, ao direito de sonhar, at the Oficina Cultural Oswald de Andrade in São Paulo, as a laboratory of lecture and the production of text on Black existence and dissidents. The same year, she was invited by the Swedish embassy in Brazil and by UN Women to host the opening ceremony for “Pais presentes: a paternidade ativa na Suécia e no Brasil”, realized by the HeForShe initiative. The event included the presence of representatives of the Federal District, the Metrô de Brasília, UN Women and the Swedish Embassy.

As an educator, she administered the course “privilégio branco: uma questão feminista?”, the first Brazilian course on the theme of whiteness, colonialism, and structural racism, and has had more than 100 tours since its beginning in 2019.

== Works ==
In 2025, Nascimento made her debut in prose literature with the romance água de maré, which won the first edition of the Prêmio Pallas of literature (2024), after she had 17 titles published since 2016, when she released her first poetry collection. Her first musical album, meio beat meio banzo, was released on digital format. Nascimento composed the track Iodo+Now Frágil on Luedji Luna's debut album Um corpo no mundo.

In 2018, she was published on the Revista Observatório of Itaú Cultural, as entry number 24, alongside Consuelo Bassanesi, Denise Stoklos, Lucina Jiménez Lopéz, Chico Pelúcio, Guti Fraga, Ana Mae Barbosa, Alcione Araújo, Ricardo Dal Farra, Kiko Dinucci, Benjamim Taubkin, Maria Vlachou, German Ray, and Claudio di Girólamo.

=== Poetry ===
- esboço, Brasília: Padê editorial, 2016
- lundu, Brasília: Padê Editorial, 3ª edição, 2016
- mil994, Brasília: Padê Editorial, 2018
- 07 notas sobre o apocalipse, ou, poemas para o fim do mundo, Garupa e Kza1 edições, 2019
- Oriki de amor selvagem: todos os poemas de amor preto (ou quase), Brasília: Padê Editorial, 2020
- Palavra Preta, Salvador: Organismo, 2021
- Lunduzinho, trad. Natália Affonso (inglês), Nova Iorque: Ugly Duckling Press, 2022
- um ebó di boca y otros [silêncios], São Paulo: Peirópolis, 2023
- Abebe, Rio de Janeiro: Navezona, 2023
- palabra, prieta, trad. Lucía Teninna (espanhol), Buenos Aires: Mandacaru, 2024

=== Stories ===
- Três tigres tortas, Rio de Janeiro: Amarcord (um selo da ed. Record), 2023

=== Romance ===
- Água de maré, Rio de Janeiro: Pallas, 2025

=== Essays ===
Sources:

- leve sua culpa branca pra terapia (ed. trilíngue), Brasília: Padê Editorial, 2019
- um sopro de vida no meio da morte, Juiz de Fora: macondo editora, 2019
- cuírlombismo literário: poesia negra lgbtqi desorbitando o paradigma da dor, n-1 edições, 2019
- Mas como toda a opressão está conectada? in Patrícia Lessa, Dolores Galindo (orgs.), Relações multiespécies em rede: feminismos, animalismos e veganismo [online], Maringá: Eduem, 2017
- leve sua culpa branca pra terapia, 2. ed, São Paulo: n-1, 2020
- racismo visual, sadismo racial: quando (?) nossas mortes importam, São Paulo: n-1, 2020
- privilégio branco: uma questão feminista (?), Brasília: Padê, 2022

=== Translations ===
- Entre nós mesmas, poesia de Audre Lorde, Rio de Janeiro: Bazar do Tempo, 2020
- Calamidades, ensaios de Renee Gladman, Rio de Janeiro: A Bolha, 2021
- A vulva é uma ferida aberta e outros ensaios, ensaios de Gloria Anzaldua, Rio de Janeiro: A Bolha, 2021
- Nossos mortos em nossas costas, poemas de Audre Lorde, Rio de Janeiro: A Bolha, 2021
- Os diários do câncer, ensaios de Audre Lorde, Rio de Janeiro: Ginecosofia, 2024
- Abdias, intérprete do Brasil, São Paulo: Todavia, 2025

=== Music ===
- "Meio beat meio banzo", online: spotify, 2025

== Recognition ==
Água de maré won the Prêmio Pallas de literatura in 2024. Palavra Preta was a finalist of the Prêmio Jabuti in the poetry category in 2022. Lundu was selected by the Projecto Nacional Leia Mulheres (Brasil) for their Best Books of 2016 category. In December 2017, it was the Book of the Month in the Lendo Mulheres Negras edition in Brasília, and the 2018 edition in Salvador. Her poetry books lundu and mil994, are referenced in the book The Art of Brasília: 2000-2019 by Sophia Beal, which has a portrait of Nascimento on the cover of the first edition.
