= Rincon Sapiência =

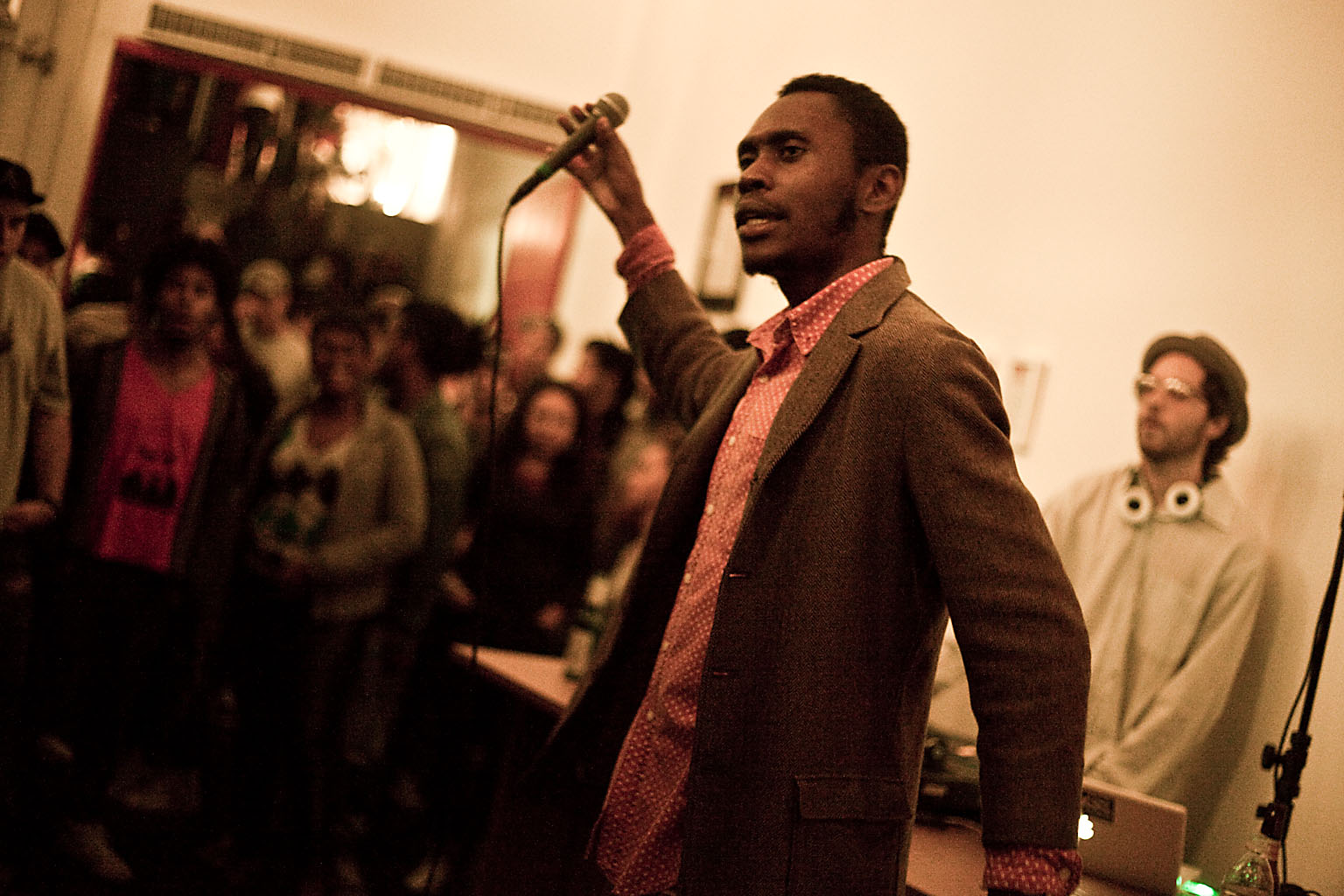
- Rincon Sapiência in 2010

Background information
- Also known as: Manicongo
- Born: Danilo Albert Ambrosio; 9 September 1985 (age 41); São Paulo, Brazil
- Genres: Rap; Hip hop
- Occupations: Rapper; poet; singer; composer; multi-instrumentalist
- Years active: 2000—present

Danilo Albert Ambrosio (born 9 September 1985), better known by his artistic names Rincon Sapiência or Manicongo, is a Brazilian rapper and poet. He began his career in 2000, and gained success in 2009 with the single "Elegância".

== Career ==
Rincon Sapiência began his career in 2000 as part of the band Munições da 38, where he performed under the names Rincon X and MC Shato. Still, he worked as part of the groups Ébanos, 2º Assalto, Plano B, Equilíbrio Insano and Porte Verbal, performing with the latter in their album As Coisas Vão Melhorar..., released by Salmus Produções in 2003. In 2005, he became a member of the label Plano Áudio, made by rapper Kamau, and was part of the band Simples, during which he released his first solo song, "Aventureiro", that was included in the album Escuta Aí. Beginning after that, he would perform shows throughout São Paulo state and other states.

Along with rapping, Rincon developed poetry workshops, hip hop events, and other social activities. In 2005, he participated in the World Social Forum, where he rapped freestyle on an open mic and won the improvised championship that took place at the event. He also took part in the group Audácia, which also included Cafuris, RG, Rocha, and Raphão. In 2009, he participated in the TV Cultura program Manos e Minas together with Projota and Rashid. A month after, in July 2009, he released "Elegância", which was accompanied by a music video in March 2010 that was shown on MTV Brasil. This single became part of his first promotional album, titled Promotrampo Volume 1.

He was nominated for the 2010 MTV Video Music Brazil in the Rap category. He took part in the NX Zero album Projeto Paralelo where he appeared on the track "Tarde Pra Desistir", one of four rare tracks.

In 2016, Rincon released his single, titled "Ponta de Lança - Verso Livre". Rincon also participated in Poetas no Topo 3.1 - Prólogo, a series of videos that brought together 38 MC's from 8 states.

His solo album Galanga Livre was honored as the best Brazilian album in 2017 by Rolling Stone Brasil. With both Galanga Livre and Ponta de Lança, his works have appeared in academic works putting forth the possibilities of the dialogue of rap as Afro-Brazilian literature. Blackness and the reeducation of ethnic-racial relations have been part of his musical career.

In 2018, Rincon joined various legendary and respected rappers in the Brazilian rap scene, such as Emicida, Mano Brown, Rael, Djonga, and BK in the single O céu é o limite. Along with works with Drik Barbosa and Rubel, Rincon started an artistic partnership with IZA, including the single "Ginga"; and with Alice Caymmi on the track "Inimigos" on her album Alice. In 2019, he released his second studio album, titled Mundo Manicongo: Dramas, Danças e Afroreps, premiering the single Mundo Manicongo on the YouTube channel COLORS.

== Personal life ==
Rincon was born on 9 September 1985 in São Paulo. He discovered, through DNA testing, that he has 94.7% African ancestry (North Africa and West Africa) and 5.3% Indigenous ancestry.

== Discography ==
=== Albums ===
Album	Detail
Galanga Livre	Released: 25 May 2017; Format: Digital download; Label: Boia Fria Produções
Mundo Manicongo: Dramas, Danças e Afroreps	Released: 25 November 2019; Format: Digital download and LP; Label: MGoma

=== Extended play (EP) ===
Album	Details
SP Gueto BR	Released: 15 May 2014; Format: Digital download; Label: Boia Fria Produções

=== Live albums ===
Album	Details
Rincon Sapiência no Estúdio Showlivre por Coala Festival	Released: 7 July 2017; Format: Digital download; Label: Showlivre

=== Promotional albums ===
Album	Details
Promotrampo Vol 1	Released: 2010; Format: Digital download; Label: Independent

=== Singles ===
==== As main artist ====
Song	Year	Album
"Elegância"	2009	Promotrampo Vol 1
"Linhas de Soco"	2014	
"A coisa Tá Preta"	2016	Galanga Livre
"Ponta de Lança"	2016	Galanga Livre
"Meu Bloco"	2017	Galanga Livre
"Ostentação à Pobreza"	2017	Galanga Livre
"A Volta pra Casa"	2017	Galanga Livre
"Afro Rep"	2017	
"Área de Conforto"	2018	
"Resenha de Futebol" (Rincon Sapiência part. Karol Conka, Rael)	2018	
"Pimenta" (Rincon Sapiência with Cortesia Da Casa and Haikaiss)	2018	
"Mete Dança"	2018	
"Crime Bárbaro"	2018	
"Placo"	2018	
"Dame Mais"	2018	
"Bon Voyaga (Crioulo em Paris)	2019	

==== As invited artist ====
Title	Year	Album
"Tarde Pra Desistir" (NX Zero part. Rincon Sapiência)	2010	Projeto Paralelo
"Hoje Tem Batuque" (Raphão Alaafin part. Rincon Sapiência)	2016	
"Melanina" (Drik Barbosa part. Rincon Sapiência)	2018	Espelho
"Chiste" (Rubel part. Rincon Sapiência)	2018	Casas
"Ginga" (IZA part. Rincon Sapiência)	2018	Dona de Mim
"Na Quebrada" (PEDRO part. Rincon Sapiência)	2018	Na Quebrada
"Dame Mais" (Tropkillaz part Rincon Sapiência, Clau)	2018	
"Fazer Valer" (Amanda Magalhães part Rincon Sapiência)	2018	
"O Céu é o Limite" (Devasto Prod with BK', Emicida, Mano Brown, Djonga, Rincon Sapiência, and Rael)	2019	

=== Video clips ===
Title	Year	Director(s)	Notes
"Elegância"	2010	Gabriel Braga and Luis Rodrigues	
"Transporte Público"	2013	Rincon Sapiência	
"Profissão Perigo"	2014	Andreh Santos	
"Coisas do Brasil"	2014	Luba Construktor	
"Linhas de Soco"	2014	Evandro Ambrosio	
"Ponta de Lança (Verso Livre)"	2016	Jonah Emilião	
"Meu Bloco"	2017	Jorge Dayeh (Anão)	
"Ostentação à Pobreza"	2017	Marco Loschiavo	
"A Volta pra Casa"	2017	Kill The Buddha	
"Afro Rep"	2017	Agência Dabba	
"Área de Conforto"	2018	Mooc	
"Ginga"	2018	Felipe Sassi	IZA's video clip
"Resenha de Futebol"	2018	Fred Ouro Preto	

== Filmography ==
=== Film ===
Year	Title	Role	Ref.
2015	Jonas	Cesinha	
2020	<i id="mwAak">Selvagem</i>	Professor Antônio	

=== Television ===
Year	Title	Role	Notes	Ref.
2017	Afronta!	Himself	Documentary series Episode: "Rincon Sapiência"	

== Awards and nominations ==
Year	Award	Category	Nominated	Result	Ref.
2017	Prêmio Multishow	Artist Revelation	Rincon Sapiência	Won	
2017	Prêmio Multishow	Best Album Cover	Galanga Livre	Won	
2017	Prêmio Multishow	Best Producer	Galanga Livre	Won	
2018	Prêmio Gshow	Hymn of the Year	'Ginga' (IZA part Rincon Sapiência)	Won	
2019	Troféu Internet	Best Singer	Rincon Sapiência	Nominated	
2019	Festival Guarnicê de Cinema	Best Original Soundtrack	Selvagem (2020) Rincon Sapiência, RBS, Leonardo de Sá, Libaldo Mantovanni Neto	Won	
