= Alegre Corrêa =

Brazilian musician (born 1960)

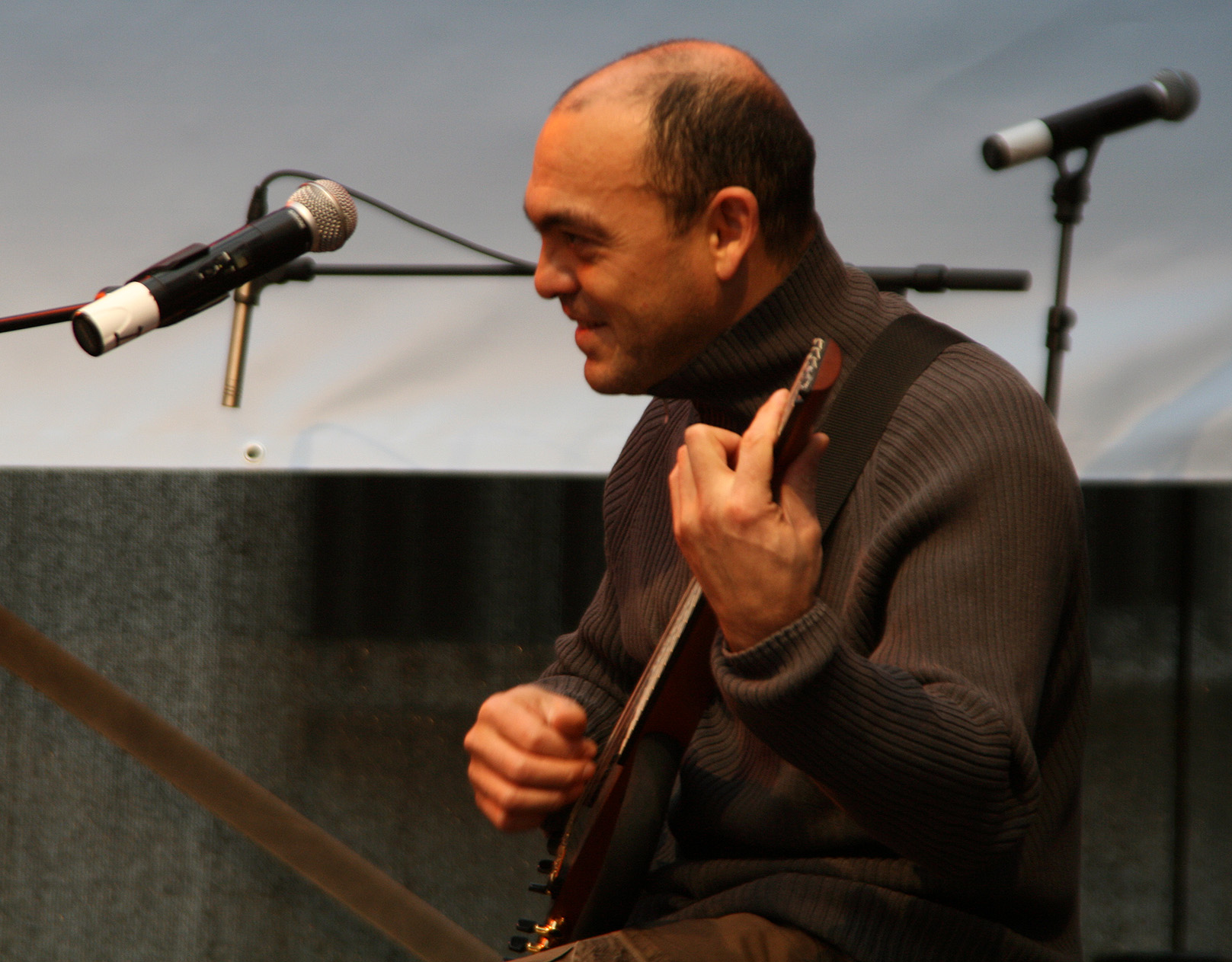
- Born: 1960 (age 65–66); Passo Fundo, Rio Grande do Sul, Brazil
- Occupations: Multi-instrumentalist, composer

Alegre Corrêa (born 1960) is a Brazilian guitarist, violinist, and percussionist. Having been based out of Vienna, Austria since 1988, he leads the Alegre Corrêa Sextet. He was a member of the Vienna Art Orchestra and Austrian Jazz band The Zawinul Syndicate. He is also a composer and arranger of MPB music.

== Biography ==
Corrêa was born in 1960 in Passo Fundo, Rio Grande do Sul. A self-taught musician, he began performing at age 13. While in Brazil, he created musical groups with musicians including Luiz Carlos Borges and Letieres Leite. He became known to wider audiences after winning the 1987 FAMPOP Festival in Avaré, São Paulo. After moving to Vienna in 1988, he would later release his debut single Infância while collaborating with Hermeto Pascoal. He would later join the Vienna Art Orchestra at the invite of Mathias Rüegg. While with Vienna Art Orchestra, they performed with João Gilberto at Jazz Fest Wien.

He has also worked to popularize International Jazz Day, working with Senegalese musician Alune Wade on a rendition of Café Oran. He has also collaborated with sibling musicians François Muleka and Marissol Mwaba. He currently is the bandleader of the Alegre Corrêa Sextet, which includes Wade, Gerald Preinfalk, Fagner Wesley, Matheus Jardim, and Bertl Mayer.

While part of The Zawinful Syndicate, he was the guitarist and berimbau player on the album 75, which won the 2010 Grammy Award for Best Contemporary Jazz Album. He also has received individually awards from the state of Rio Grande do Sul, as well as the Hans Koller Preis.

== Discography ==
- Década das cores e dos sons - Best Of Alegre Correa
- Mauve
- Raízes
- Handmade
- Negro coração
- Infância
- Terra mágica
- Brasilianische Schrammeln
- Leme
