= Kaká Werá =

Brazilian Kayapo writer and politician

Kaká Werá Jecupé (born February 1, 1964, São Paulo) is a Brazilian Kayapo writer and politician. He is a member of the Green Party.

== Works ==
- "Tupã Tenondé no pé"
- "A Terra dos Mil Povos - História Indígena do Brasil Contada por um Índio"
- "As Fabulosas Fábulas de Iauaretê"
- "Oré Awé - Todas as Vezes que Dissemos Adeus".
