= Sítio do Quinto =

Coordinates: 10°22′S 38°13′W

- Municipality
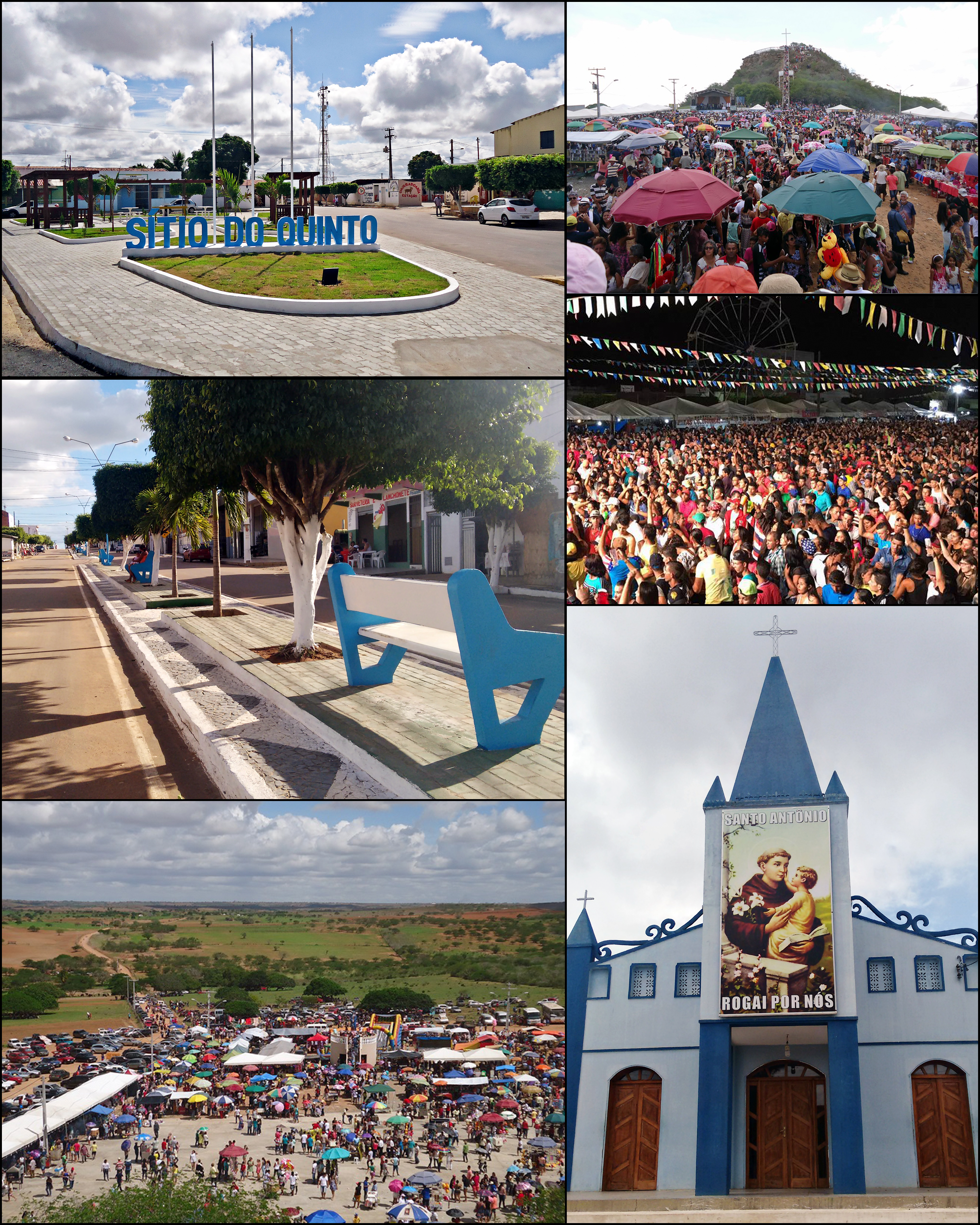

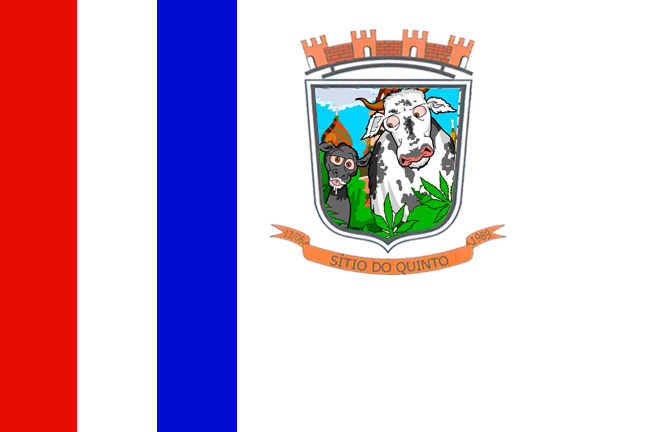
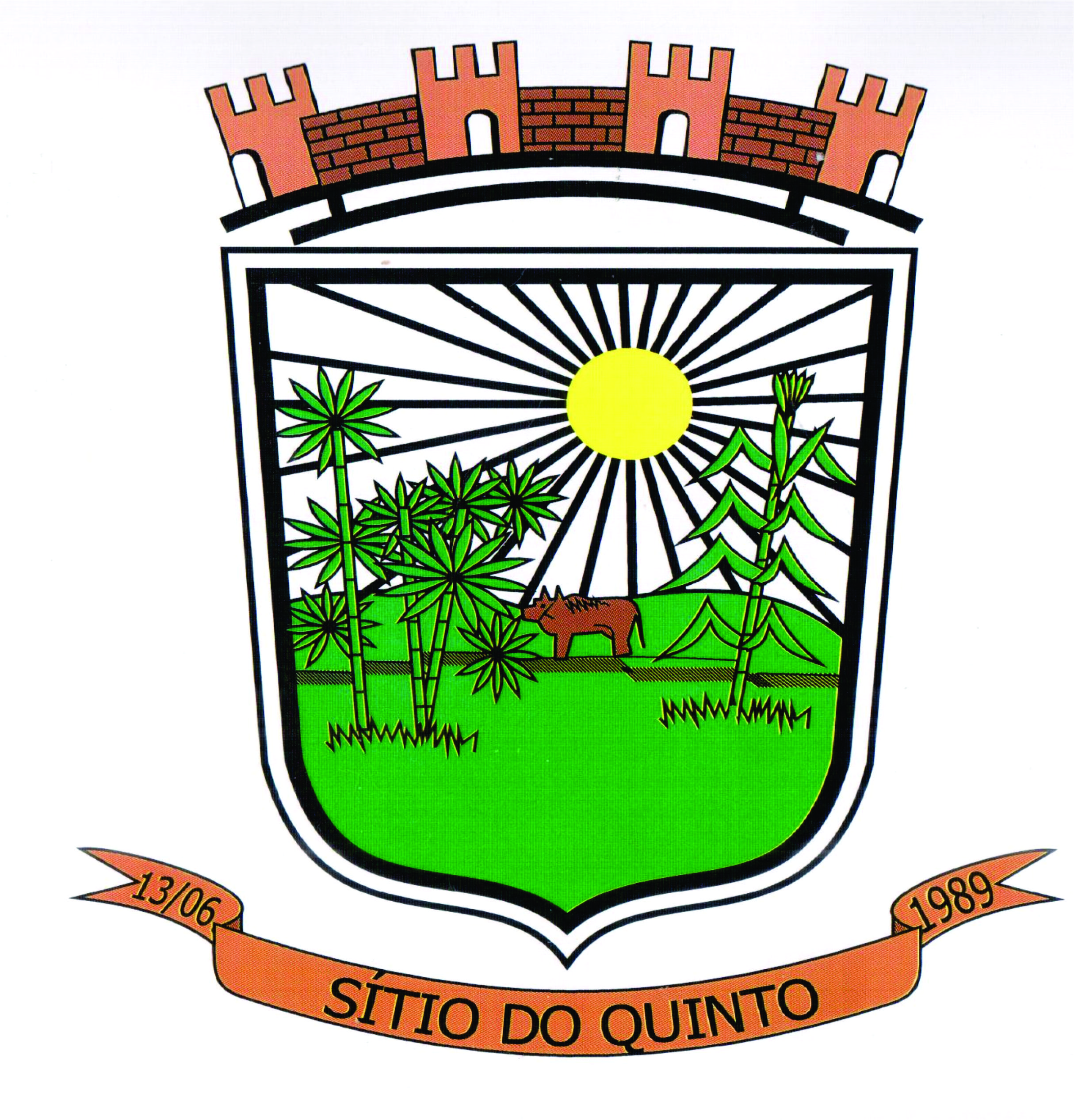
- Flag Coat of arms
- Interactive map of Sítio do Quinto
- Country: Brazil
- Region: Nordeste
- State: Bahia

Population (2020)
  - Total: 9,701
- Time zone: UTC−3 (BRT)

Sítio do Quinto is a municipality in the state of Bahia in the North-East region of Brazil.

== See also ==
- List of municipalities in Bahia
