= Catanduvas, Santa Catarina =

Municipality of Santa Catarina, Brazil

Catanduvas
- Municipality of Santa Catarina, Brazil
- Flag Coat of arms
- Etymology: Named after the tree of the same name
- Location of Catanduvas in Santa Catarina

- Location within Brazil Location within South America
- Coordinates: 27°4′15″S 51°39′43″W
- Country: Brazil
- Region: South
- State: Santa Catarina
- Founded: 16 March 1963

Government
  - Mayor: Monalisa Ruaro (PL) (2025-2028)
  - Vice Mayor: Antonio Ozório Netto (PSD) (2025-2028)

Area
  - Total: 199.166 km^{2} (76.898 sq mi)
- Elevation: 945 m (3,100 ft)

Population (2022)
  - Total: 10,566
  - Density: 53.05/km^{2} (137.4/sq mi)
- Demonym: Catanduvense (Brazilian Portuguese)
- Time zone: UTC-03:00 (Brasília Time)
- Postal code: 89670-000
- HDI (2010): 0.714 – high
- Website: catanduvas.sc.gov.br

Catanduvas is a city in Santa Catarina, Brazil. It is located at around 27°04′15″S 51°39′43″W. As of 2020, the estimated population was 10,984.
