= Drik Barbosa =

Brazilian rapper, singer and songwriter

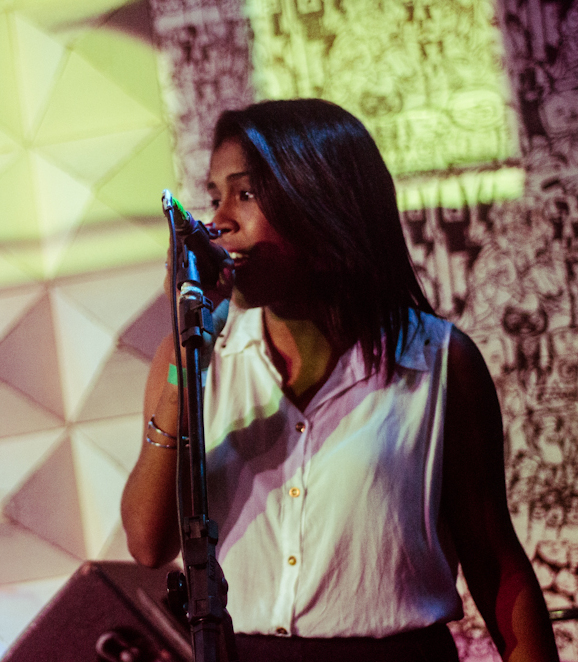

Background information
- Born: Adriana Barbosa de Souza; April 21, 1992 (age 34)
- Origin: Santo Amaro, São Paulo, Brazil
- Genres: Hip-hop; pop; R&B
- Occupations: Rapper; singer; songwriter

Adriana Barbosa de Souza (April 21, 1992), better known as Drik Barbosa, is a Brazilian rapper, singer and songwriter.

== Biography and career ==
Born in Santo Amaro, South Zone of São Paulo, she is the eldest of the 3 daughters of Dalvanise Barbosa and Edinildo Batista. She has been composing since she was 14 years old. She got to know Rap through the "Batalha do Santa Cruz" in 2007 at the age of 15 where she presented her first rhymes, one of the most important rhyming competitions in national rap and which brought names like Projota, Emicida, Rashid, Marcello Gugu and Flow MC to worldwide recognition. From there, she received invitations from other MC's to participate in their work. In mid-2012, she released her first songs, the singles “Pra eternizar” and “Não é mais você”, which provided a small emphasis on her work, reaching new audiences.

Touted as a promising revelation of national rap, Drik was highlighted throughout 2013 by collaborating in numerous partnerships alongside the already renowned rapper Emicida, the first of which was in the song “Aos Olhos de Uma Criança”, soundtrack for the Oscar-nominated film “ O Menino e o Mundo" a children's animation made by Alê Abreu. Still in 2013, in partnership with music producer Casp (GROU) and with the participation of rapper Rafael Lira, Drik Barbosa released the single "Deixa eu te carry". In 2015, she collaborated again with rapper Emicida, this time in the song “Mandume” from the album “Sobre Crianças, Quadris, Pesadelos e Lições de Casa”, her participation in “Mandume” was a watershed in her career, drawing attention in high level projection. national. She integrated audiovisual projects on the internet, where she released two new songs, “Banho de Chuva” and “Rima Sim”. In the same period, she joined the female rap collective Rimas e Melodias alongside six other women: Mayra Maldjian, Tatiana Bispo, Karol de Souza, Stefanie, Tássia Reis and Alt Niss, with whom in 2017 she released the independent CD “Rimas & Melodias”, recorded at Red Bull studios, in São Paulo, with the participation of philosopher Djamila Ribeiro. The album launch show was presented at Circo Voador, in Rio de Janeiro. In 2017, she joined the cast of the label Laboratório Fantasma.

== Filmography ==
Year	Title	Role	Notes	Ref.
2020	Emicida: Amarelo - É Tudo Pra Ontem	Ela mesma	Documentário na Netflix	

== Discography ==
=== Studio albums ===
Title	Album details
Drik Barbosa	Lançamento: 11 de outubro de 2019; Formato(s): Download digital; Gravadora(s): Laboratório Fantasma

== Awards and nominations ==
Year	Award	Category	Performance	Result
2020	MTV Millennial Awards 2020	Beat BR	Ela Mesma	Nominated
2020	WME AWARDS BY Music	Música Alternativa	“Tentação (feat. ÀTTØØXXÁ)”	Won
