= Luedji Luna =

Brazilian singer-songwriter (born 1987)

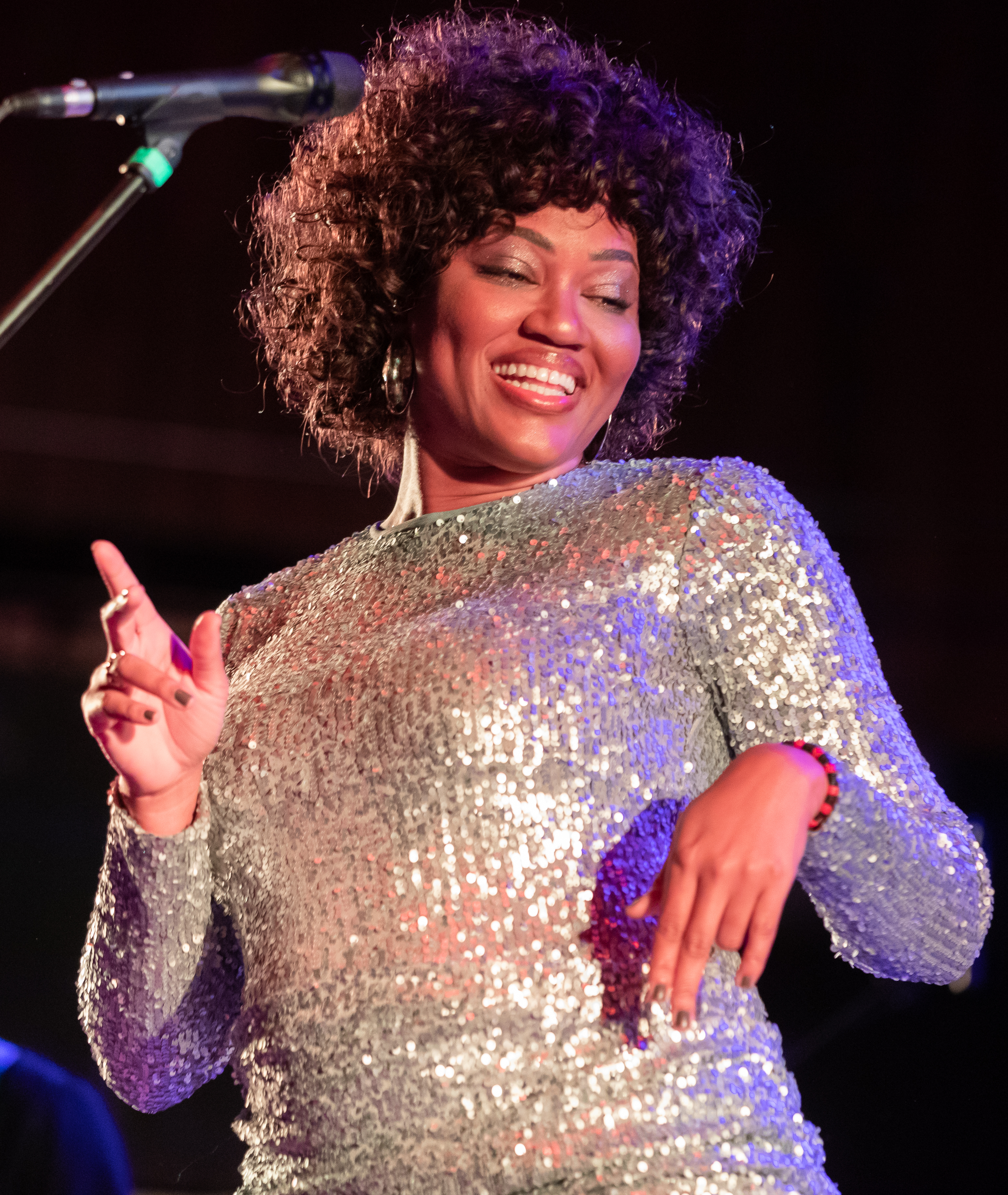
- Luna in 2023
- Born: Luedji Gomes Santa Rita; 25 May 1987 (age 39); Salvador, Bahia, Brazil
- Occupation: singer
- Years active: 2014–present
- Musical career
- Genres: MPB, jazz

Luedji Gomes Santa Rita (born 25 May 1987), known professionally as Luedji Luna, is a Brazilian singer-songwriter.

== Life and career ==
Born in Salvador, Bahia, Luedji Luna is the daughter of an economist mother and an historian father. She studied law at the Federal University of Bahia and singing at the Escola Baiana de Canto Popular. She started performing in 2011, and in 2014 made her record debut with the single "Dentro ali". In 2017, her debut album Um Corpo no Mundo was released; for this work, she was awarded a Bravo Award and was nominated as best new artist at the 2018 Multishow Brazilian Music Award.

Luedji Luna's second album Bom mesmo é estar debaixo d'água was released in 2020, and was nominated for a Latin Grammy Award for Best MPB (Musica Popular Brasileira) Album. A deluxe version of the album was released in 2022 and included 10 new songs. In 2025, she released two albums back to back, Um Mar Pra Cada Um and Antes Que A Terra Acabe. Um Mar Pra Cada Um won the Latin Grammy Award for Best MPB Album.

Luedji Luna toured in the United States, Europe and Canada, and performed in major events including the Montreal International Jazz Festival, the Rudolstadt-Festival, and the Amsterdam Roots Festival.

== Discography ==
Albums

- Um Corpo no Mundo (2017)
- Mundo (Remix) (EP 2019)
- Bom Mesmo É Estar Debaixo D'Água (2020)
- Bom Mesmo É Estar Debaixo D'Água Deluxe (2022)
- Um Mar Pra Cada Um (2025)
- Antes Que A Terra Acabe (2025)
