= Brasília hip-hop =

Music genre

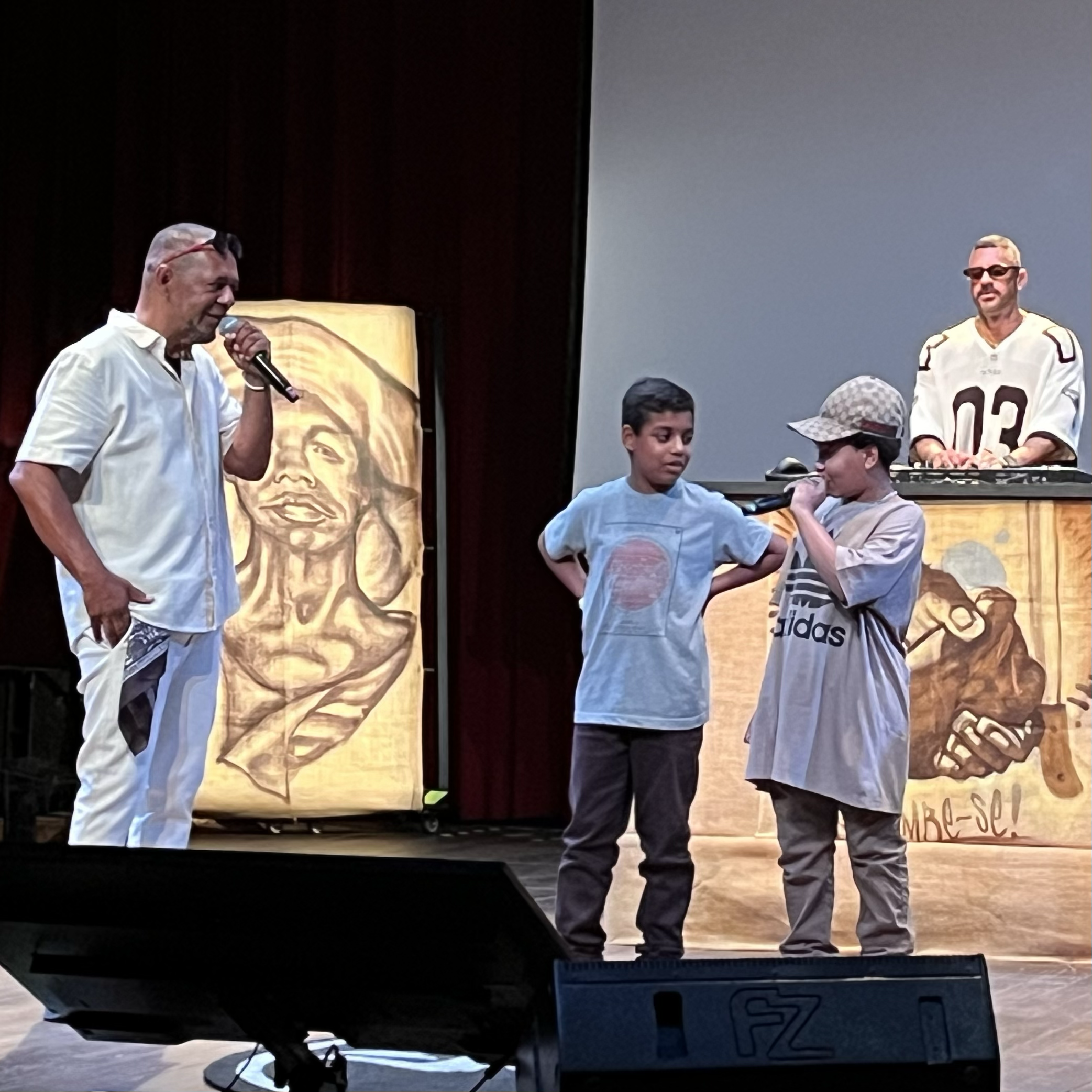
GOG and DJ A at Teatro dos Bancários in Brasília

Hip-hop has been present in the "brasiliense" social and musical scene since the late 1980s. It is arguably the second biggest hip-hop scene in Brazil. The first generation of rappers included GOG and DJ Jamaika. The second generation initiated with MC RAPadura in the 1990s. Nowadays, one of the most successful female rappers from Brasília is Flora Matos. Furthermore, the current generation, from the year 2000 onwards, has many groups and MCs who are releasing their projects and creating new events to expand the hip-hop scene in Brazil's capital.

== History of the Brasília hip-hop scene ==
=== First generation ===
This section talks about two of the pioneers of the first generation of rappers in Brasília. DJ Jamaika is one of the main pioneers responsible for elevating and spreading the hip-hop scene in the Distrito Federal (DF) area since 1993. He has participated in various radio and TV programs, such as Transamérica. He is a rapper from Ceilândia, satellite city around Brasília. He was in a hip-hop group called Alibi in 1999. He was also part of the group Câmbio Negro, which was initiated by a Brasiliense rapper called X in 1990. One of his best known CDs is Pá Doido Pirá which is also used as an important reference in Brazilian hip-hop. In 2002, DJ Jamaika became a Christian and started working only with gospel rap CDs. In 2007, he won the "Prêmio Hutúz" national Brazilian award for best beatmaker. GOG is another pioneer of the hip-hop culture in Brasília. He was born in Sobradinho, satellite city around Brasília, and moved to Guará in 1973, another satellite city around Brasília, where he resided until 1991. He is a rapper and began his career as a poet. His first CD was recorded in 1992 with the title Peso Pesado ("Heavy Weight"). In 2007, he won the Prêmio Hútuz award for best artist. His most recent work is DVD Cartão Postal Bomba!, released in 2009.

=== Second generation ===
MC RAPadura Xique-Chico was born in Fortaleza and came to Brasília in 1997. He demonstrated interest in hip-hop music when he participated in GOG's song "A quem possa interessar" from the Aviso às gerações album. MC RAPadura has participated in several repente (see Repente) contests (these are contestants in which people improvise with music from Brazil's northeast region), on account of his original and innovative style, which is utilizing Brazilian "forró" music and mixing it with his self-produced hip-hop beats. In 2008, RAPadura performed in a TV Cultura episode of Manos e Minas, with MV Bill. Rapadura is well known for performing with a farmer straw hat which was created in Fortaleza. In 2020, Rapadura released a new album called Universo do Canto Falado.

=== Female rappers ===
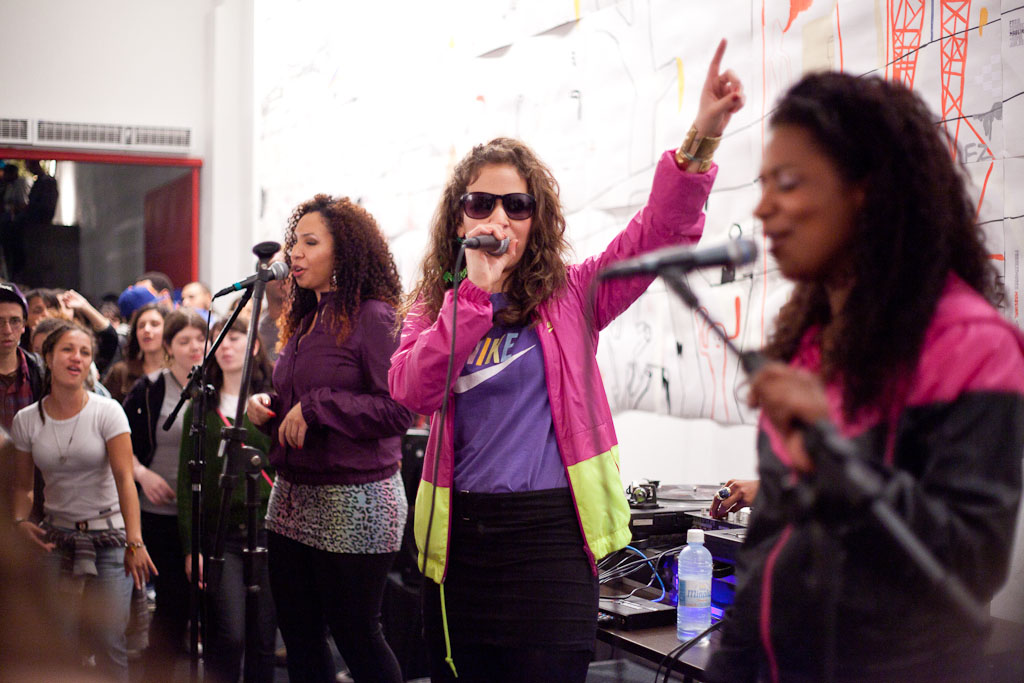
Brazilian MC Flora Matos

There are also many promising female artists from Brasília, who are successful in Brazil. One of them is Flora Matos, who was raised by a musicians’ family. She performed on stage for the first time with the band "Acarajazz" when she was only 4 years old, because her father was the band's songwriter. In 2003, Flora performed in her first solo project, "Noções Unidas", with the producer Chicco Aquino. Her influences are Racionais MCs, Dina Di Sabotage, Kamau, MC Marechal etc. In 2006, she started to sing with DJ Brother, which earned her the award for the best singer of the year in Brasília. In 2007, she recorded a remix of the song "Véu da Noite", from the singer Céu, produced by KL Jay (Racionais MCs’ DJ and beatmaker). She became popular after working with famous DJs of the Brazilian RAP such as KL Jay, DJ Cia, etc. In 2008, she was invited by KL Jay and Ice Blue to participate in the mixtape "O Jogo é Hoje", supported by Nike and directed by Blue and Mano Brown where she recorded the song Mundo Pequeno. In October 2008, she toured Europe (Paris, Angers, etc.). When she returned, she released her first single called "Jogo da Velha." One year later, she performed with Emicida and in the end of the year she released her first mixtape called Flora Matos vs Stereodubs.

=== Current generation ===
Various events were created in Brasília to enhance the hip-hop culture, from the DaBomb parties to the 2010 battles called "Calango Pensante". Calango Pensante was created by MC Ahoto (Jorge Pinho) to motivate the various MCs to battle in Conic (a mall located in the center of Brasília). There are prizes for the runner up and winner of the battle, such as the sum of the money given by each competing MC in the beginning of the event or concert tickets to a Brazilian hip-hop show. MC Ahoto also created other events such as "I love Rap DF", which is an event where the hip-hop groups can perform and promote their work. His first hit was the song "Fogo na Bomba" which was produced by Emtee (of Movimento Plano Crew - MPC). The song is basically about Graffiti art and tagging in general, bombing, since MC Ahoto is also an active graffiti artist. In fact, MC Ahoto started out as a graffiti artist. He has a tagging crew called "Kaligrafia Mardita" and was nominated in the Graffiti best prize category in 2011 (Prêmio Hip Hop Zumbi – Edição Dandara). Currently, he is one of the main representatives of Samambaia (neighborhood from Brasília) and has had several collaborations with other MCs, three of the most famous are: "Flowgados", the group "Movimento Plano Crew", and "Coletivação." MC Ahoto won the 2010 "Microfonia" event, an MC Battle which happened in Brasília and which gave MC Ahoto the opportunity to travel to Rio de Janeiro and participate in the national Brazilian Battle: "Liga dos MCs." He also won the award for best Brasiliense MC of 2011. Prêmio Hip Hop Zumbi was an event created in 2010 by ArtSam to make the hip-hop culture in Brasília even more powerful. This event recognizes and values the many local talents of the DF state, which just happens to be the second biggest hip-hop scene in Brazil. It also makes the scene more professional, with political and popular participation, thus making social activism known. The name chosen illustrates well this main objective, refreshing the memory of the Brazilian people to the slave who was the leader of the biggest Quilombo (a clan of refugee slaves) from Brazil, Zumbi.

There were awards for the Distrito Federal (DF) hip-hop projects released between July 2009 and October 2010.

In 2017, the hip-hop scene in Brasília has expanded quite a bit. New rappers such as: Alves, Froid, Jean Tassy, Murica, among others have gained nacional attention and some notoriety.

Furthermore, Hip-Hop producers from the local scene have emerged. Beatmakers such as: Disstinto and Emtee Beats have been responsible for making instrumentals and producing tracks for local artists and rappers.

MCs and groups such as: Froid, TheGust MCs, Yuri Pleno, and ZKAR have shown some great potential in their songs.

== MC battle championships ==
Currently, there are more than twenty MC battles taking place in Brasília, which function as tournaments where the participants are judged by the public (and, sometimes, also by judges) who evaluate their ability in constructing freestyle rhymes and verses. It is uncertain to specify when exactly Brasília's MC battles first initiated, but the growth in their popularity is quite noticeable. In 2010, there were three regular MC battles, such as the Calango Pensante event, which took place monthly at the Conic mall. Nowadays, there are more than twenty battles and the majority occur on a weekly basis. There are smaller battles, which attract other little communities and there are big, well-established battles that usually attract a larger audience, such as the Batalha do Museu. There is a battle specifically aimed towards women, the Batalha das Gurias (BDG). Finally, there is the Batalha do Neurônio, which is a battle where MCs must demonstrate their knowledge by freestyling about specific themes and topics.

=== Calango Pensante ===
Created in 2010 by Jorge Pinho also known as MC Ahoto. The battles were held at a local outdoors mall called conic.

=== Batalha do Museu ===
Created in 2012 by Mc Zen (Gerson). This battle in Brasília occurs every Sunday at the Nacional Museum of Brazil. This battle was created because of the need for MC gatherings to bring people together and help teach Brazilian kids about the hip-hop culture in general. MC Zen, with the help of other rappers from the Distrito Federal (DF) region, created the Batalha do Museu (Battle of the Museum) event, held every Sunday at 4 pm, next to Brazil's National Library.

=== Batalha do Neuronio ===
Created in 2012 by MC Zen and Emtee, initially known as "Raciocinio RAPido!".

Later restructured by Naui Paiva and Biro Biro Ribeiro and the name was modified to "Batalha do Neuronio". It started out at a location in Brasília called "Vila Planalto", where MC Zen lives. Eventually, this location was altered to Taguatinga, to be specific a local park called "Taguapark".

Usually, the general themes used in battles vary and range from everyday topics to political and philosophical discussions, for instance: soccer or films. Basically, topics may change a lot according to the theme proposed by the audience and what the MC raps about.

=== Batalha da Escada ===
Created between March and April 2015, the project is an initiative by UnB students that showed interested in the hip-hop culture. Gatherings in order to freestyle rhymes called upon more and more people and evolved into what is now a weekly event that attracts an audience of approximately 400 people to the arena theater, at the Darcy Ribeiro Campus in the University of Brasília. The collective responsible for the project, which consists of around ten people, also carries out other activities, such as: workshops, lectures at schools and events, interventions of various types and other initiatives provided by the multidisciplinary nature of the relationships between those involved. Battles usually take place outside the Northern Central Institute of Sciences (ICC Norte), with the promise of combining hip-hop culture with the university's academic area.

=== Batalha das Gurias ===
Created in 2013 by five women who participated in Rap battles at Brasília's National Museum, the collective began with the purpose of encouraging female participation in the hip-hop culture. Basically, the collective Batalha das Gurias (BDG) fights for women's rights in Rap music. At BDG events, it is common to witness complaints against gender inequality. Another important factor is that BDG runs several workshops in schools and is present at festivals and music related congresses.
