= Costa a Costa =

- Origin: Fortaleza, Ceará, Brazil
- Genres: Rap, Hip hop, Funk melody, Pop
- Years active: 2005–2007
- Past members: Don L Nego Gallo; DJ Flip Jay; Cabeça; Aluza

Costa a Costa was a Brazilian rap and hip hop group that was created in 2005 in Fortaleza, Ceará. In 2007, they released the mixtape Dinheiro, Sexo, Drogas e Violência de Costa a Costa, through the independent label DuNego, created by the members of the group. The work sold thousands of self-made copies, received critical and media recognition and influenced a new generation of rappers in the country.

== History ==
Costa a Costa was formed in 2005 by Don L and Nego Gallo. They met for the first time when their former rap groups — Plano B and Brigada de Rua — began to perform and have recording sessions together.. Afterwards, Berg Mendes and DJ Flip Jay also became members of Costa a Costa. Their productions touch on problems and solutions to life in the ghetto and, along with rap and R&B, bring in influences from funk, samba, carimbó, and other Afro-Latino genres, such as mambo and reggaeton. The group used samples and music from Bezerra da Silva, Tim Maia, Pinduca, James Brown, and Pérez Prado, among others.

The group's only work, the mixtape Dinheiro, Sexo, Drogas e Violência de Costa a Costa was released in 2007 and brought together 23 tracks with about 80 minutes of music. It had 8,000 distributed copies throughout Brazil and around 25,000 downloads. For this feat, the group was nominated for the Prêmio Hutúz and won the award for the North-Northeast category. Costa a Costa became more well known when they performed on Central da Periferia, presented by Regina Casé on TV Globo. To top it off, the group was again nominated for the Prêmio Hutúz and won the "Best Groups/Artists of the North-Northeast of the decade", together with Rapadura and Comunidade da Rima.

The mixtape was immediately commentated on by Hermano Vianna, author of "O mundo funk carioca" (Zahar, 1988), who described it as one of the most creative pieces of music in Brazilian music. He also described it to the mixtape, Vianna also referred to the mixtape as a scathing document on the reality of Brazilian contemporary life.

Costa a Costa's music was also a response to a type of defeatism that the rappers had felt took over the national rap scene at that time. Through the mixtape, they proposed a reaction that includes actions ranging from mixing danceable rhythms to breaking a certain taboo in the scene about artists being able to be financially successful, as can be observed in the rhymes of "Intro – No Melhor Lugar".

While singing that "Fazer rap é igual em qualquer lugar (...) Fortaleza é igual a qualquer lugar" (Making rap is the same as any other place...Fortaleza is same as any other place), the rappers also ended up contributing to the start of a long cycle during which the center of gravity of Brazilian rap started to shift from São Paulo-Rio to the Northeast. One of the emerging names of that generation, Pernambuco-based Diomedes Chinaski, listened to the mixtape and went on to affirm that Costa a Costa exerted the most important influence on the youth of Recife than other rap groups in Brazil at the time. This is evidenced in their accents, which are attributed to people from Ceará and that their rhythms, which were described as not just "a sermon". Along with this, Costa a Costa was considered to have a different form of fashion, adopting colorful clothes, bandanas, and tinted glasses.

After Costa a Costa ended, Don L began a solo career and moved to São Paulo, where he released the mixtape Caro Vapor/Vida e Veneno de Don L (2013) and Roteiro Pra Aïnouz, Vol. 3 (2017). Nego Gallo released the mixtape Veterano in January 2019. Flip Jay became a professional DJ and an activist in the hip hop movement, hosting cultural events in Fortaleza and São Paulo.

== Discography ==
- Aonde Fortaleza Neva (2005/2007)
- Dinheiro, Sexo, Drogas e Violência de Costa a Costa (2007)

== Awards ==
=== Prêmio Hutúz ===
Year	Category
2006	Best North-Northeast Group
2009	Best North-Northeast Group of the decade
