= Tulipa Ruiz =

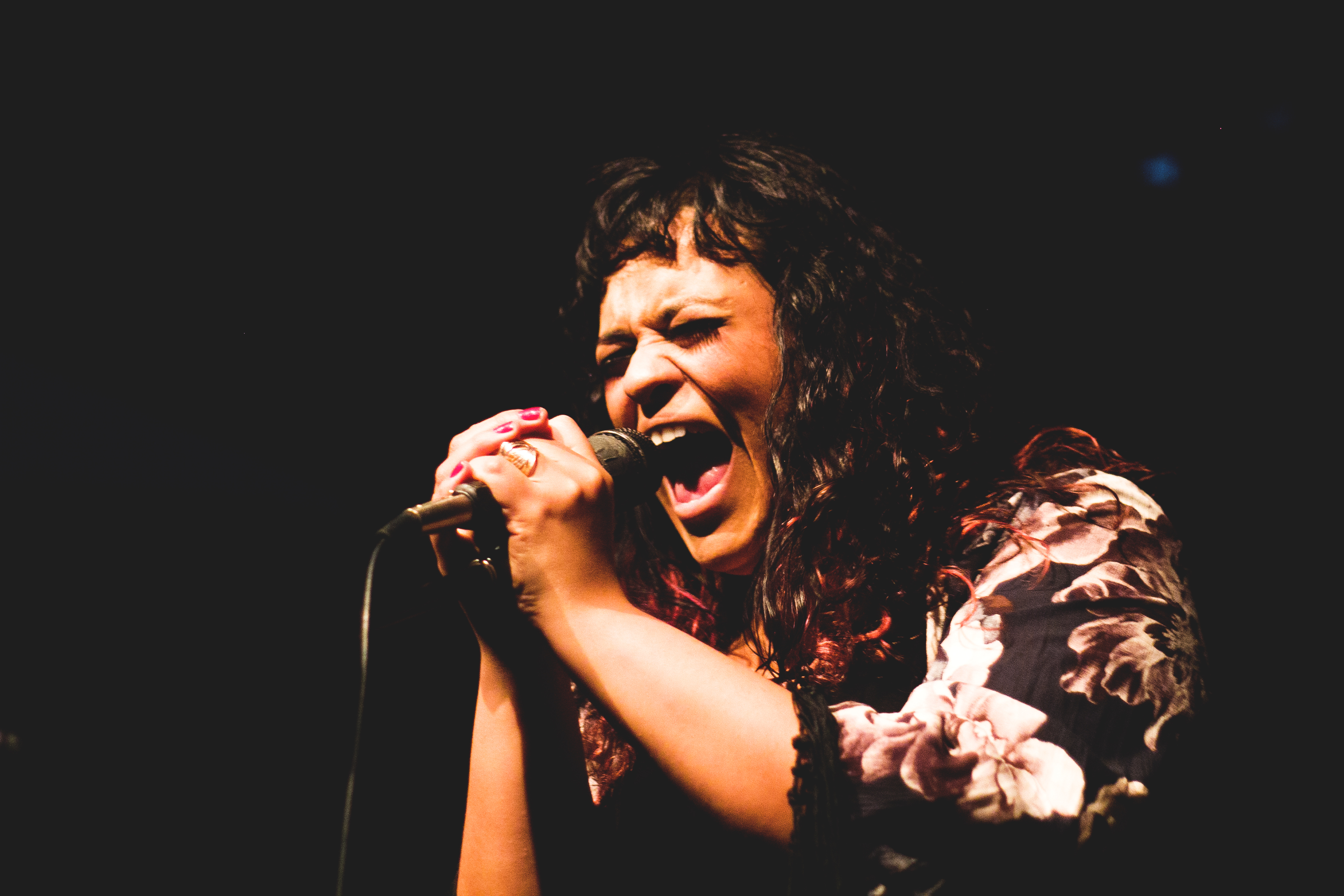
- Tulipa in 2015
- Born: Tulipa Ruiz Chagas; October 19, 1978 (age 48); Santos, São Paulo, Brazil
- Education: Pontifical Catholic University of São Paulo
- Occupations: Singer-songwriter, artist
- Years active: 2009–present
- Awards: Multishow Brazilian Music Award (2012); APCA Award (2012); Prêmio Contigo! MPB FM de Música (2013); Latin Grammy Award (2015); Prêmio da Música Brasileira (2016)
- Musical career
- Genres: MPB, pop
- Instrument: Vocals
- Labels: YB Music, Natura Musical
- Website: tuliparuiz.com

Tulipa Ruiz Chagas (born October 19, 1978), also known mononymously as Tulipa, is a Brazilian singer-songwriter and artist. She self-describes her musical style as "forest pop".

== Biography ==
Tulipa Ruiz Chagas was born in Santos, São Paulo on October 19, 1978. Her father, Luiz Chagas, was a member of Itamar Assumpção's live band Isca de Polícia; in an interview, she stated her name was a tribute to one of her father's favorite films, The Black Tulip (1964). After her parents divorced, she moved with her mother Graziella and brother Gustavo to São Lourenço, Minas Gerais, where she was raised; after growing up, she worked at a record store until moving to São Paulo at 22 years old to study journalism at the PUC-SP.

She made part of many musical ensembles during her college years, but only began her career officially in 2009. Her critically acclaimed debut album, Efêmera, came out one year later, and its eponymous song was featured in the soundtrack of the video game FIFA 11. Its 2012 follow-up, Tudo Tanto, awarded her a Multishow Brazilian Music Award and an APCA Award. Her third album, Dancê, which came out in 2015, awarded her a Latin Grammy Award. In 2013 she was a guest musician on rapper Emicida's debut O Glorioso Retorno de Quem Nunca Esteve Aqui, and in 2016 she collaborated with former Titãs member Nando Reis on his eighth solo album, Jardim-Pomar.

Tu came out in 2017 and counts with a guest appearance by Mexican musician Adan Jodorowsky, son of filmmaker Alejandro Jodorowsky. Habilidades Extraordinárias is her most recent album, released in September 2022.

Aside from her musical career, Tulipa has also provided illustrations for magazines, album covers, concert posters and notebooks; her artworks are showcased in her official Tumblr page.

== Influences ==
Tulipa claims to be strongly influenced by singers such as Meredith Monk, Joni Mitchell, Gal Costa, Ná Ozzetti, Zezé Motta, Baby Consuelo and Joyce.

== References in popular culture ==
Tulipa is alluded in Rogério Skylab's song "Jeneci, Kassin, Tulipa", off his 2018 album O Rei do Cu, alongside Marcelo Jeneci and Alexandre Kassin.

== Discography ==
=== Studio albums ===
Year	Album
2010	Efêmera: Label: YB Music; Format: CD
2012	Tudo Tanto: Label: Natura Musical; Format: CD
2015	Dancê: Label: Natura Musical; Format: CD
2017	Tu: Label: ONErpm; Format: Digital download
2022	Habilidades Extraordinárias: Label: ONErpm; Format: Digital download
