= O Glorioso Retorno de Quem Nunca Esteve Aqui =

Studio album by Emicida
- Released: August 21, 2013
- Genre: Hip-hop
- Length: 51:21
- Label: Laboratório Fantasma

Emicida chronology
O Glorioso Retorno de Quem Nunca Esteve Aqui (2013)	Sobre Crianças, Quadris, Pesadelos e Lições de Casa... (2015)

Singles from O Glorioso Retorno de Quem Nunca Esteve Aqui
- 1. "Crisântemo (feat. Dona Jacira)" Released: 23 May 2013; 2. "Hoje cedo (feat. Pitty)" Released: 30 July 2013

O Glorioso Retorno de Quem Nunca Esteve Aqui ("The Glorious Return of Someone who Was Never Here") is the debut studio album by the Brazilian rapper Emicida. The album was released on August 21, 2013, by the independent label Laboratório Fantasma. O Glorioso Retorno de Quem Nunca Esteve Aqui was supported by two singles: "Crisântemo" featuring Dona Jacira and "Hoje cedo" featuring Pitty.

== Track listing ==
No.	Title	Length
1.	"Milionário do sonho"	0:50
2.	"Levanta e anda (feat. Rael da Rima)"	2:30
3.	"Noiz"	5:03
4.	"Zóião"	3:53
5.	"Crisântemo (feat. Dona Jacira)"	5:17
6.	"Sol de giz de cera (feat. Tulipa Ruiz & Estela Vergílio)"	2:18
7.	"Hoje cedo (feat. Pitty)"	3:14
8.	"Trepadeira (feat. Wilson das Neves)"	4:43
9.	"Bang!"	4:51
10.	"Gueto (feat. MC Guimê)"	3:04
11.	"Hino vira-lata (feat. Quinteto em Branco e Preto)"	3:12
12.	"Alma gêmea (feat. Rafa Kabelo)"	4:00
13.	"Samba do fim do mundo (feat. Fabiana Cozza & Juçara Marçal)"	3:39
14.	"Ubuntu fristaili"	4:47
