= Rashid (rapper) =

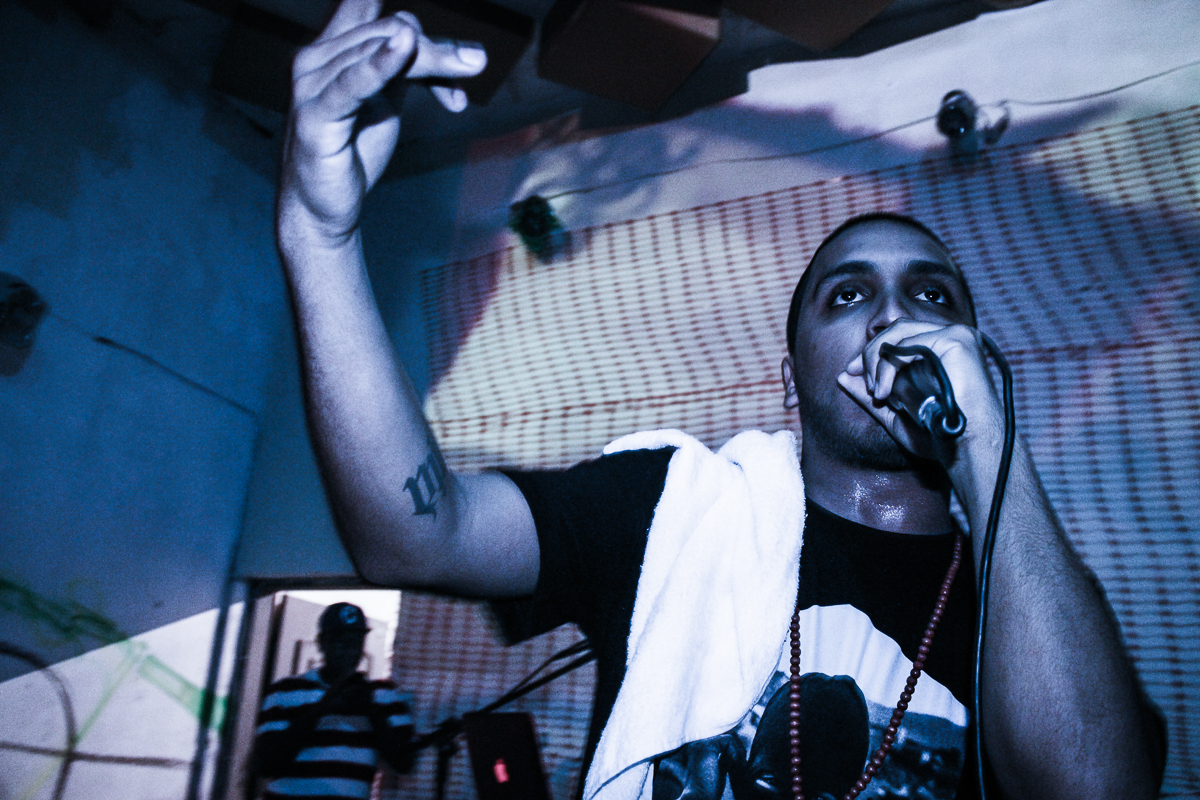
- Rashid in 2013

Background information
- Also known as: MC Rashid
- Born: Michel Dias Costa; 21 March 1988 (age 38); São Paulo, Brazil
- Genres: Rap; Hip hop
- Occupations: Rapper, author, producer, businessman
- Years active: 2006—present
- Label: Foco na Missão

Michel Dias Costa (born 21 March 1988), better known as Rashid, is a Brazilian rapper, author, producer, and businessman. He became known in the São Paulo rap scene for hits such as “Bilhete 2.0” (2017) and “Sobrou silêncio” (2020), and for his collaborations with other prominent Brazilian rappers such as Emicida, Rael, and Rincon Sapiência.

His album Crise was elected the 39th best Brazilian album of 2018 by Rolling Stone Brasil and one of the 25 best Brazilian albums of the first half of 2018 by the São Paulo Art Critics Association.

He is also the author of the 2018 book Ideias que rimam mais que palavras - Vol. 1, which explores his music and explains the meaning behind his music. He has toured extensively for the book.

== Discography ==
Album

- 2016. A Coragem da Luz
- 2018. CRISE
- 2019. Sessões Selo Sesc #4 (ao vivo)
- 2020. Tão Real
- 2022. Movimento Rápido dos Olhos
- 2024. Portal

Mixtapes

- 2011. Dádiva e Dívida
- 2012. Que Assim Seja
- 2013. Confundindo Sábios

=== EPs ===
- 2010. Hora de Acordar
- 2014. Seis Sons com Kamau
- 2017. Diário de Bordo (completo) com DJ Caíque

=== Singles ===
- 2010. Diário de Bordo 1
- 2011. Diário de Bordo 2
- 2011. Selva
- 2011. Vou Ser Mais
- 2012. Diário de Bordo 3
- 2013.Coisas dessa Vida (álbum Confundindo Sábios)
- 2014. Diário de Bordo 4
- 2014. Gratidão
- 2015. Depois da Tempestade (with Alexandre Carlo)
- 2015. Diário De Bordo 5
- 2015. A Volta
- 2017. Abre Caminhos
- 2018. Aeroporto, Hotel, Show
- 2018. Interior (with Rapadura Xique-Xico)
- 2019. Não É Desenho

=== Music videos ===
- 2010. Selva
- 2011. Nova Ordem - (with Emicida & Projota)
- 2012. Quero Ver Segurar
- 2012. R.A.P.
- 2013. Vou Ser Mais
- 2013. Virando a Mesa - part. Daniel Cohen
- 2013. Bate e Gol
- 2014. Chapa Quente - LYRIC VIDEO
- 2014. Patrão - part. Tassia Reis
- 2014. Gratidão
- 2015. Tudo Que Você Podia Ser - Tributo Milton Nascimento
- 2015. A Cena - part. Izzy Gordon
- 2016. Homem do Mundo - part. Criolo
- 2016. Cê Já Teve Um Sonho?
- 2016. Primeira Diss - LYRIC VIDEO
- 2017. Abre Caminhos
- 2017. Bilhete 2.0 - part. Luccas Carlos - LYRIC VIDEO
- 2017. Estereótipo
- 2017. Musashi
- 2017. Se Tudo Der Errado Amanhã - part. Ellen Oléria - LYRIC VIDEO
- 2017. Sem Sorte
- 2017. Mal Com o Mundo
- 2017. Química
- 2018. Música de Guerra
- 2018. Pés na Areia (Promessas) - part. Godô
- 2018. Aeroporto, Hotel, Show
- 2018. Bilhete 2.0 - part. Luccas Carlos
- 2018. Interior - part. Rapadura Xique-Xico
- 2019. Não É Desenho
- 2019. Todo Dia - part. Dada Yute
- 2019. Sobrou Silêncio - part. Duda Beat
- 2019. SSNS (Vevo Sessions)
- 2020. Pipa Voada - part. Emicida e Lukinhas
- 2020. Casca (Vevo Sessions)
- 2020. Blindado

== Books ==
- 2018, Ideias que rimam mais que palavras - Vol. 1 - Foco na Missão - ISBN 978-85-53174-00-3

== Awards and nominations ==
Year	Award	Category	Nomination	Result	Ref.
2022	MTV Millennial Awards	Clipão da Porra	Pílula Vermelha, Pílula Azul – Rashid	Nominated	
