= Skeeter Beats =

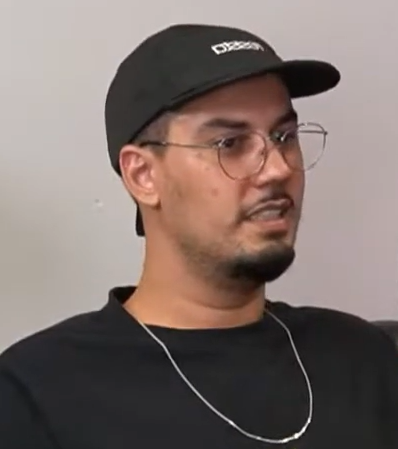

Background information
- Born: Luiz Ricardo Santos
- Origin: São José dos Campos, São Paulo, Brazil
- Genres: Hip hop
- Occupations: Beatmaker, DJ
- Years active: 2006–present
- Label: Warner Music

Luiz Ricardo Santos, better known by his stage name Skeeter Beats or simply Skeeter, is a Brazilian Beatmaker and DJ. Skeeter is known for his work with Brazilian rappers such as Coruja BC1, DÖ MC, Emicida, Haikaiss, Projota, Rashid, Yago Oproprio, among others. Along with Yago Oproprio and Rô Rosa, Skeeter has one diamond record for the song "Imprevisto".

== Biography ==
Skeeter Beats was born in São José dos Campos, São Paulo. He has been active in the Brazilian hip-hop scene since 2006. Skeeter became known for his productions for artists such as DÖ MC, Emicida, Rashid, Projota, Coruja BC1, Haikaiss, among other prominent names in Brazilian hip-hop.

=== Career ===
He began his journey as a DJ and independent beatmaker, creating instrumentals influenced by boom bap, soul, and jazz, which are characteristic of classic rap sound. Over time, Skeeter Beats established his name in the national hip-hop circuit, collaborating with various MCs and collectives from São Paulo and other regions of the country. Over the years, he has accumulated hundreds of millions of streams on digital platforms, becoming one of the most listened-to beatmakers in Brazil today. In addition to his work in the studio, Skeeter is also a music educator and participates in cultural initiatives aimed at peripheral communities, such as the project Rap na Mala, a partnership with DÖ MC, which brings workshops and mobile recordings to young people in communities across Greater São Paulo.

=== Musical Style ===
Skeeter's style combines elements of traditional Hip-Hop, Brazilian music, and contemporary urban sounds, with a focus on musicality and authentic rhythms. Skeeter often blends vinyl samples with digital production, creating a balance between the classic and modern. He chops up music samples using the "SliceX" tool in FL Studio and creates new melodies over programmed drum beats by utilizing a MIDI controller.

=== Recognition ===
Skeeter Beats has been highlighted in specialized media outlets such as Bocada Forte, O Grito, Jornal do Rap, and RapDab, frequently appearing in lists of the most influential and most listened-to producers in Brazilian rap.

== Production credits ==
=== Singles ===
Track information
Passando a Limpo
- with Coruja BC1
- Released: 2016
Velhos Amigos
- with Emicida
- Released: 2010
De Onde Estou (coproduced by D.A.C.)
- with Haikaiss
- Released: 2015
Imprevisto
- with Yago Oproprio & Rô Rosa
- Released: 2022

=== Instrumental Albums ===
Album information
Juzchillin
- Released: July 18, 2024
- Label: Selo Estelita

=== Video Clips ===
- 2015 – De Onde Estou (with Haikaiss)
