= Froid (disambiguation) =

Froid is a town in Montana.

Froid may also refer to:

- Froid (rapper) (born 1993), Brazilian rapper
- Mont Froid, a mountain of the Cottian Alps in France
