= Sobre Crianças, Quadris, Pesadelos e Lições de Casa... =

Studio album by Emicida
- Released: August 7, 2015
- Genre: Hip hop; MPB
- Length: 51:21
- Label: Laboratório Fantasma; Sony Music
- Producer: Emicida

Emicida chronology
O Glorioso Retorno de Quem Nunca Esteve Aqui (2013)	Sobre Crianças, Quadris, Pesadelos e Lições de Casa... (2015)	AmarElo (2019)

Singles from Sobre Crianças, Quadris, Pesadelos e Lições de Casa
- 1. "Boa Esperança" Released: 30 June 2015; 2. "Passarinhos" Released: 29 July 2015

"Sobre Crianças, Quadris, Pesadelos e Lições de Casa..." is the second studio album by the Brazilian rapper Emicida. The album was released on August 7, 2015, by the independent label Laboratório Fantasma.

== Track listing ==
No.	Title	Length
1.	"Mãe (feat. Dona Jacira & Anna Tréa)"	4:57
2.	"8"	3:29
3.	"Casa"	4:01
4.	"Amoras"	0:56
5.	"Mufete"	3:58
6.	"Baiana (feat. Caetano Veloso)"	3:53
7.	"Passarinhos (feat. Vanessa da Mata)"	3:41
8.	"Sodade"	1:10
9.	"Chapa"	4:38
10.	"Boa Esperança (feat. J. Ghetto)"	3:02
11.	"Trabalhadores do Brasil (feat. Marcelino Freire)"	1:22
12.	"Mandume (feat. Drik Barbosa, Amiri, Rico Dalasam, Muzzike & Raphao Alaafin)"	8:15
13.	"Madagascar"	3:52
14.	"Salve Black (Estilo Livre)"	4:42
