= Pentágono =

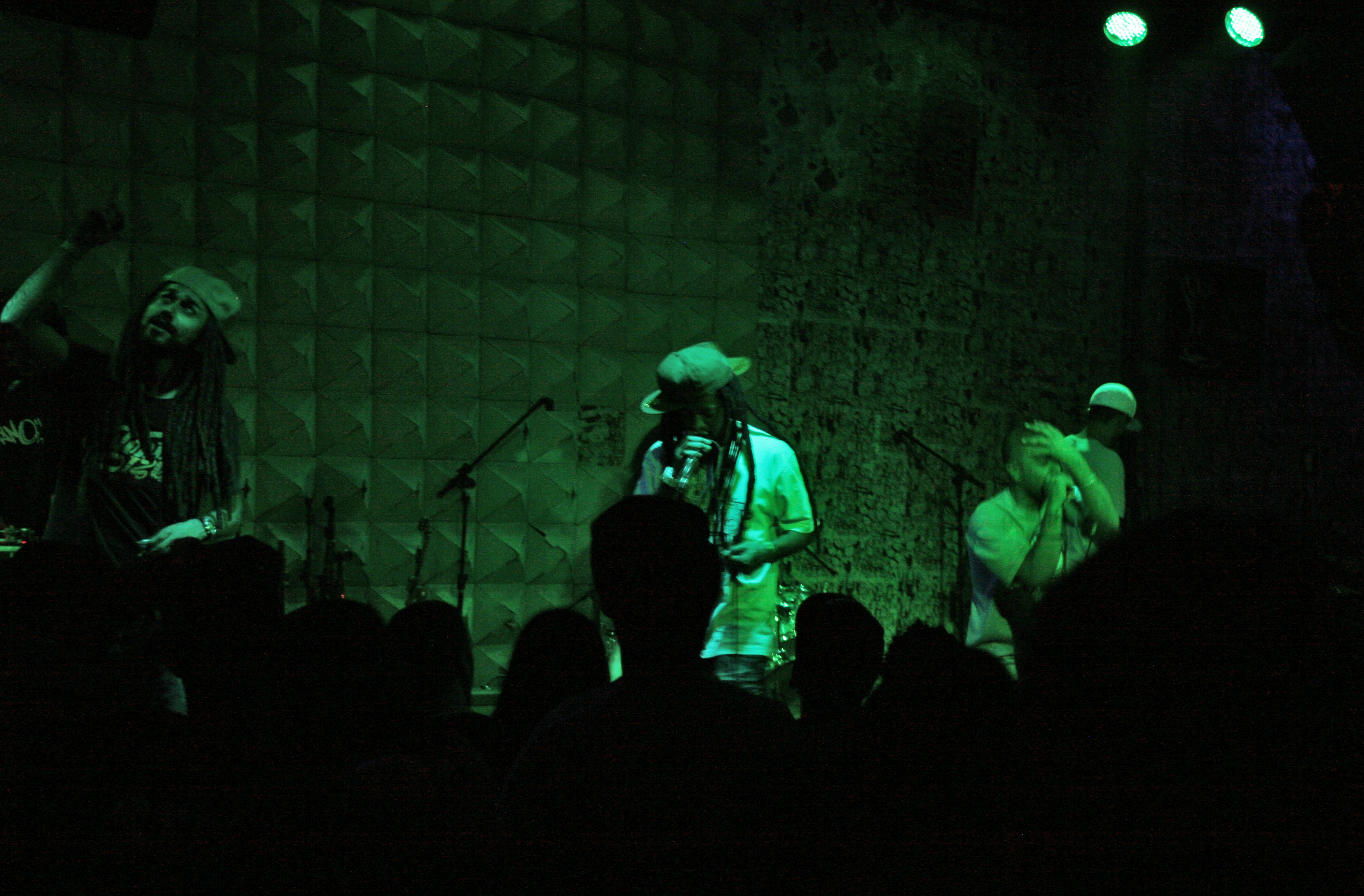
- Pentágono in 2011

Background information
- Origin: São Paulo, Brazil
- Genres: Rap; Alternative hip hop Reggae; Underground hip hop
- Years active: 2001–2013
- Past members: Apolo; Massao; Dodiman; Paulo M. Sário; DJ Kiko; Rael da Rima

Pentágono was a Brazilian rap group with its origins in São Paulo. Since it was created, it has recorded four works. The name (Portuguese for "Pentagon") is the result of the union of its five members: Rael da Rima, Apolo, Massao, Dodiman, Paulo M. Sário, and DJ Kiko.

== History ==
Pentágono came to be in 2001 with the collaboration of 5 MCs and 1 DJ: Rael da Rima, Apolo, Massao, Dodiman, Paulo M. Sário, and DJ Kiko. In 2004, they were nominated for the MTV Video Music Brazil 2004 for the best Rap Music Video for "Na Moral". Still with MTV, the group was the only rap group to have a blog on MTV's Brazilian website. "Na Moral" was on the group's first album, titled Microfonicamente Dizendo, was released in 2004 and was the winner of the Hip-Hop Top Prize. They were also nominated for the "Revelação" of the Prêmio Hutúz that same year, but was won by Cabal.

Pentágono was also nominated for "Best Revelations of the Decade" by Hutúz. In 2008, the group released its second album, Natural, which mixes rap with pop and reggae. Along with, they released the single, "É o Moio", which also included a music video; The song was released on radio and on MTV. In October of that year, Pentágono performed in France, releasing their newest work.

The group announced that they were disbanding in a show on 17 October 2013. Each member of the "Time do Loko" began solo careers or sought new partnerships.

== Discography ==
- Microfonicamente Dizendo (2004)
- Natural (2008)
- 5 (2009)
- Manhã (2012)
