= Batalha do Museu =

Rap event in Brazil

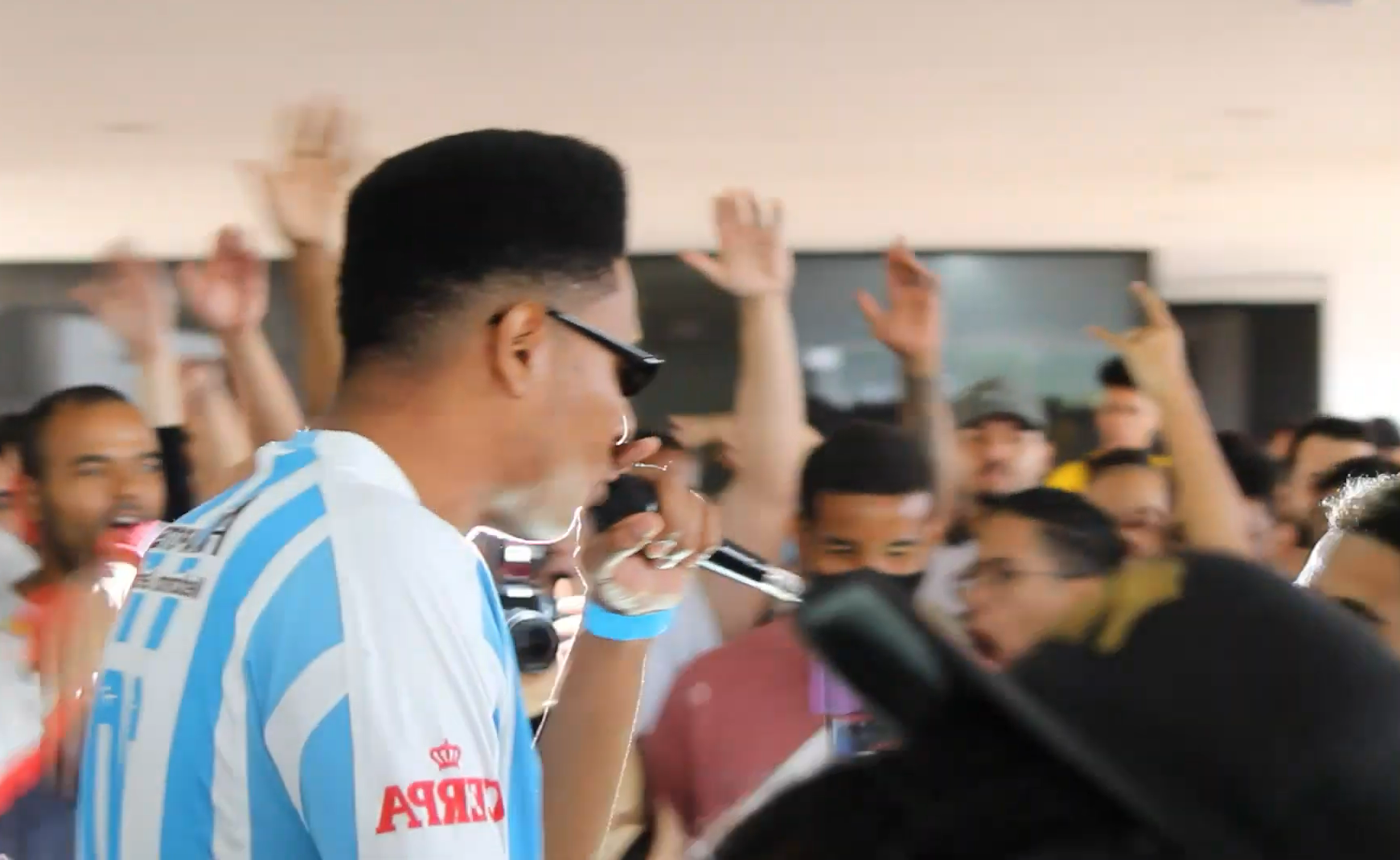
- Hate RCT at the Batalha do Museu event.
- Genre: Hip hop
- Locations: Brasília, Brazil
- Years active: 2012-present
- Founder: Zen MC

Batalha do Museu is a cultural collective and an example of a Rap battle event that occurs in Brasília, created in 2012 by Gerson Macedo de Oliveira also known as Zen MC. The event is a part of Brasília Hip Hop's MC Battle foundation history and usually takes place every Sunday at Brasília's national museum.

== History ==
In 2012, Gerson Macedo wanted to practice and further develop his freestyle rap skills, therefore he created the Batalha do Museu event. In 2018, there was some controversy when MC Zen freestyled about governor Rodrigo Rollemberg, who was present at the event. In 2022, Batalha do Museu hosted the Freestyle Master Series (FMS), organizing the Brasiliense qualifying round. The artists who participated in the event were: Zen, Vitu, Menezes, Japa, Durap, CN, Tonhão, Kadoshi, Levinsk, Ruto, Dias, Motta, MT, CS and Gomes. Women also participate at the Batalha do Museu event, as well as children. Such as MC BMO, who was 13 years of age when engaging in battles. Some artists emerged after gaining national visibility through Batalha do Museu, artists such as: Alves, Biro Ribeiro, Emtee Beats, Froid, MC Sid, Murica, Nauí, Jean Tassy, among others. The Batalha do Museu event has also inspired other battle rap festivals throughout Brazil, such as the "Imperatriz Battle" currently located in the state of Maranhão.

== Format ==
Battles usually initiate with "odds or evens" to determine which MC will go first. The starting MC will usually have 45 seconds to freestyle rap against the other MC, thus creating an attack. Then the other MC will then have 45 seconds to defend by elaborating his freestyle verses. Once the defending MC finishes, this MC will now attack for 45 seconds. Finally, the MC that initiated the battle will have 45 seconds to defend, thus concluding the battle. In case a draw occurs after the first two rounds, a third round shall be issued where both MCs must rhyme in an intercalated format, being that one MC rhymes 8 verses and the other MC rebuttals with 8 verses, the starting MC then rhymes 4 verses and the other MC replies with 4 verses in accordance. During the third round, this intercalated format goes on until the time is up (commonly 45 seconds in duration). The crowd and judges then determine the winning MC. The MCs who want to participate need to give their name and, normally, 16 people are drawn. In each round, the MCs are eliminated so that, in the end, the winner is chosen. Within battles there are established models.

== MC Battle Competitions ==
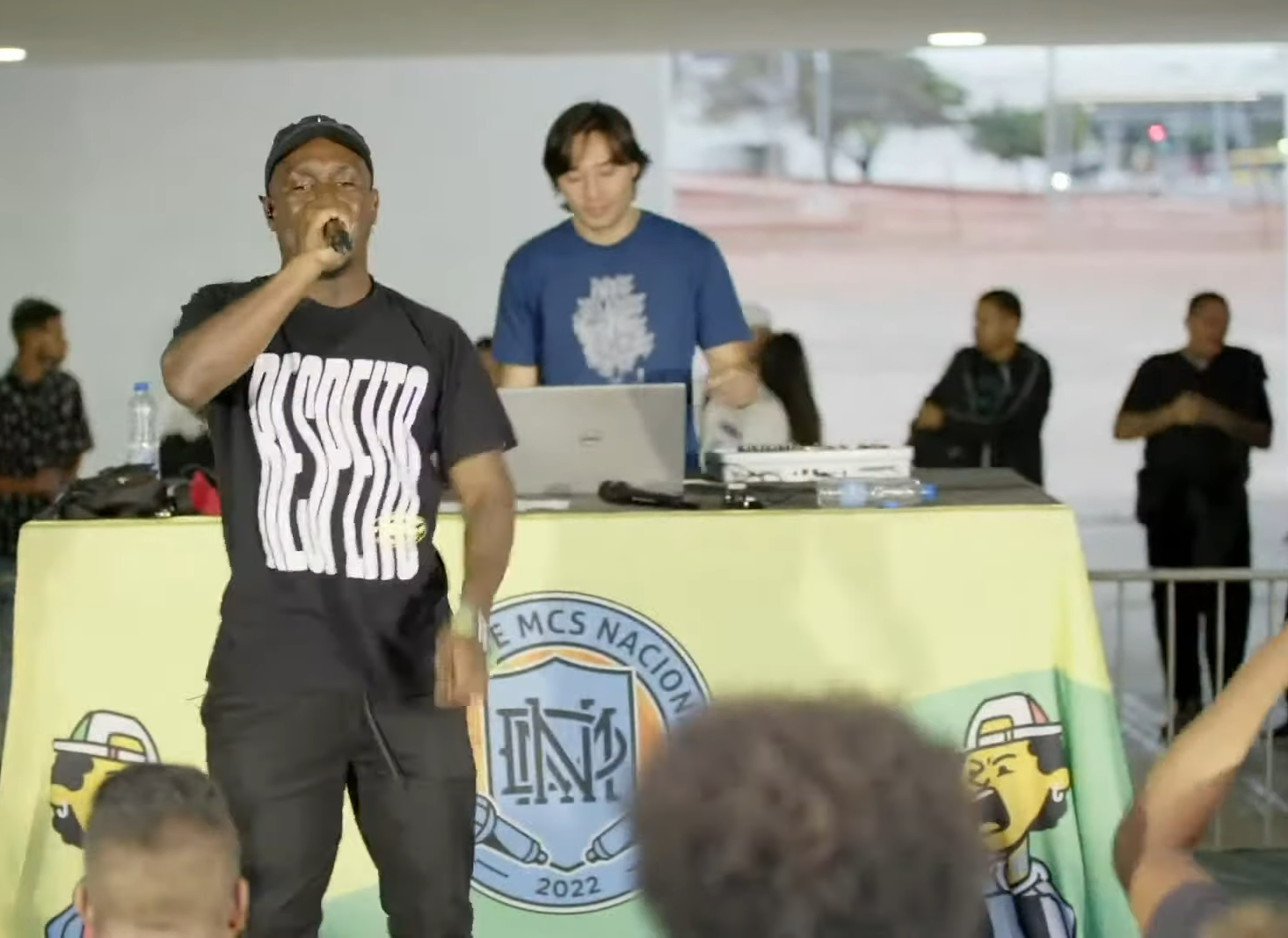
Douglas Din and Emtee Beats at the 2022 Brasília state MC battle competition

Every year, Batalha do Museu holds a competition among MCs from Brasília to select one for the National MC Battle Competition, which is usually held at Belo Horizonte. Therefore, the MC representing Brasília will have a chance to become Brazil's champion MC. In 2019, Brasília's winner was rapper Hate Aleatório. 16 MCs participated in the competition and Emtee Beats was the event's DJ, playing the instrumentals utilized in the battles. The final was between Hate and MC Jhon.

In 2021, three MCs were chosen through the Batalha do Museu event, these being: Alves, Balota and Gomes. Eventually, Alves was champion of the 2020 Duelo Nacional de MC's, and the edition was held in 2021 due to the COVID-19 Pandemic.

In 2022, the Brasília state MC battle competition took place, with Douglas Din hosting the event and Emtee Beats playing the instrumentals and songs. There were also various MC competitions in several other Brazilian states, such as Amapá, Rio de Janeiro, São Paulo, among others.

== See also ==
- List of hip hop music festivals
- Hip hop culture
- Underground hip hop
