= Rael (rapper) =

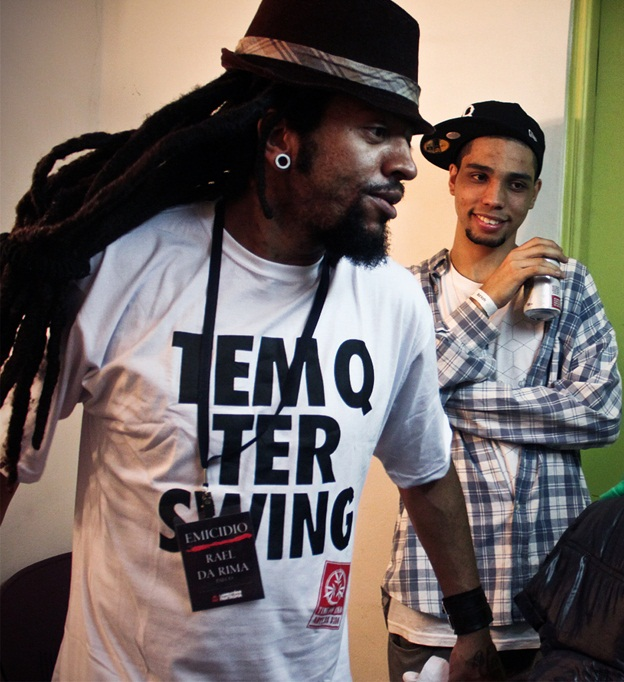
- Rael in 2010

Background information
- Also known as: Rael da Rima
- Born: Israel Feliciano; 1 October 1983 (age 43); São Paulo, Brazil
- Genres: Alternative rap; R&B; samba; reggae; MPB
- Occupations: Singer, composer, rapper
- Instruments: Vocals, guitar
- Years active: 1999—present
- Labels: Time do Loko, Tratore, Laboratório Fantasma

Israel Feliciano (born 1 October 1983), better known by his artistic name Rael (formerly Rael da Rima), is a Brazilian singer, composer, and rapper. During the middle of the 2000s, he formed his first rap group, called Can KND. The collective dissolved shortly thereafter, but it was the initial step that would give way to, a year after, Pentágono, of which he would be a member for 15 years. The group, based in São Paulo, would release four albums. Rael left in 2012 to dedicate himself to his solo career. In 2016, he returned to Pentágono.

== Career ==
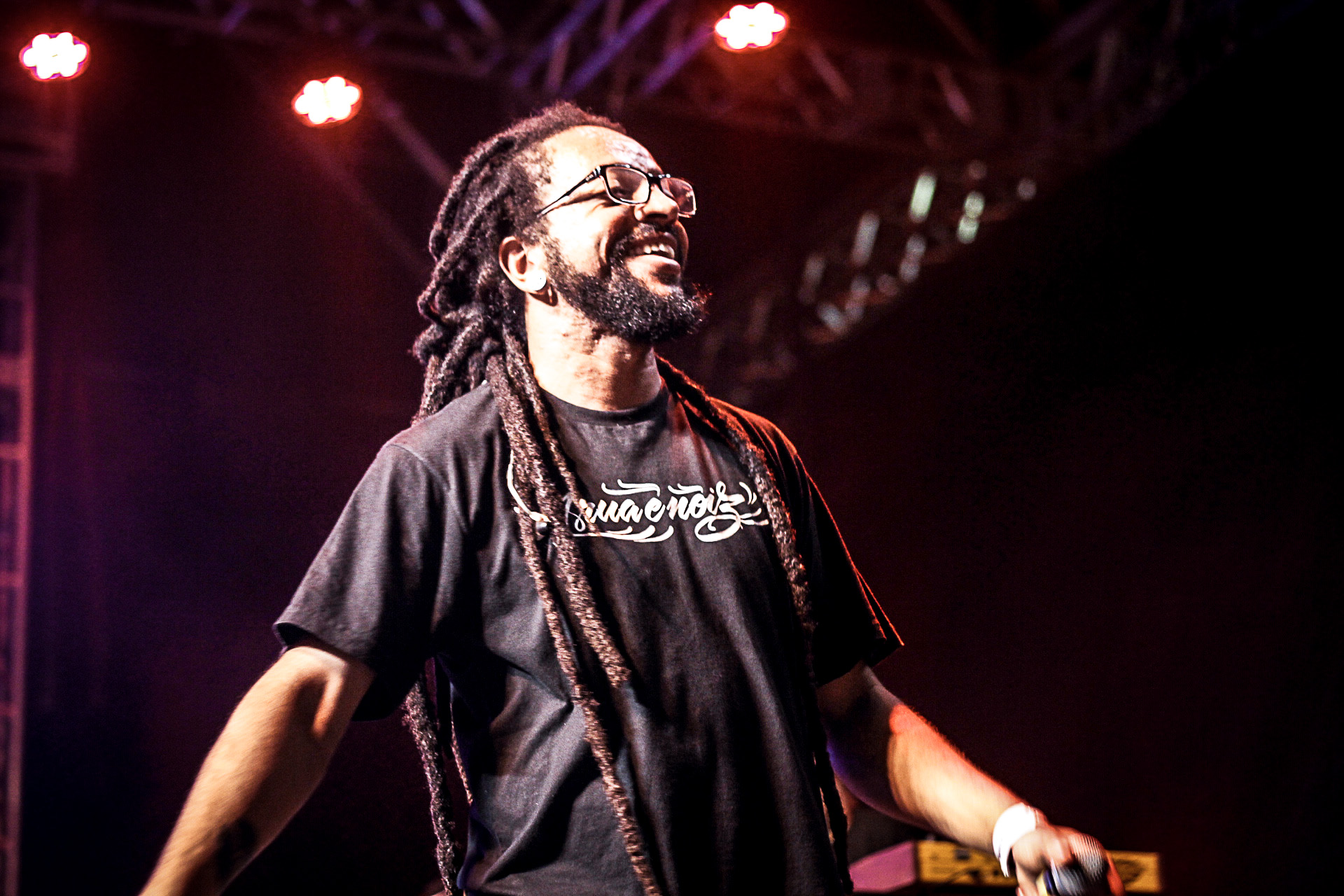
Rael at Planeta Brasil Festival in Belo Horizonte in 2012.

Rael began his musical career at 16 years old. Shortly afterwards he would form a group together with the other four members of Pentágono, which released two albums. In 2005, he was featured in the American documentary Global Lives with the song "Vejo Depois". Two years later, he was included in the group of artists that participated in the first edition of the traditional Som Brasil, by Rede Globo, as a tribute to Vinicius de Moraes. He made remakes of Moraes' songs together with rappers such as MC Rashid, Criolo, and Terra Preta. Rael had already collaborated with artists such as Emicida, Kamau, Slim Rimografia, and Don L.

Along with Som Brasil, Rael was present on the series Antônia, also by Rede Globo. In 2010, Rael released his first solo single, titled "Trabalhador". Soon after came his first album, titled MP3 - Música Popular do 3° Mundo. For the release of this CD, the rapper created a partnership with the record label Tratore. In 2011, he participated in the Emicida album Doozicabraba e a Revolução Silenciosa. In 2013, he dropped part of his nickname, "Da Rima", going as just Rael, releasing in March of that year the long-awaited album Ainda Bem que Eu Segui as Batidas do Meu Coração, with production done by the American duo Beatnick & K-Salaam, who have worked with Lauryn Hill and also signed for the album.

In 2016, he released the song "Coisas do Meu Imaginário", with special guests Daniel Yorubá, Black Alien, and Chico César. The emblematic clip of "Minha Lei", released together with the album, had special participations by Mano Brown, MC Rashid, Criolo, Emicida, Projota, DJ Marco, DJ Nyack, DJ Dan Dan, DJ Will, DJ Soares, DJ Kiko, Daniel Ganjaman, and Rappin' Hood, among other big names in the Brazilian rap scene.

In 2017, a song by Emicida where Rael participated, "A Chapa É Quente!", was nominated during the 2017 Latino Grammys for Best Urban Song. He was also nominated for an award in his own right for Best Urban Album for Coisas Do Meu Imaginário.

His album Cabim-Cidreira was elected one of the 25 best Brazilian albums during the second half of 2019 by the São Paulo Art Critics Association.

== Discography ==
=== Studio albums ===
==== With Pentágono ====
Year	Title
2005	Microfonicamente Dizendo
2008	Natural
2009	Ep
2012	Manhã

=== Solo career ===
Year	Title
2010	MP3 - Música Popular do 3° Mundo
2013	Ainda Bem que Eu Segui as Batidas do Meu Coração
2014	Ep (álbum)
2014	Diversoficando
2016	Coisas do Meu Imaginário
