= Don L =

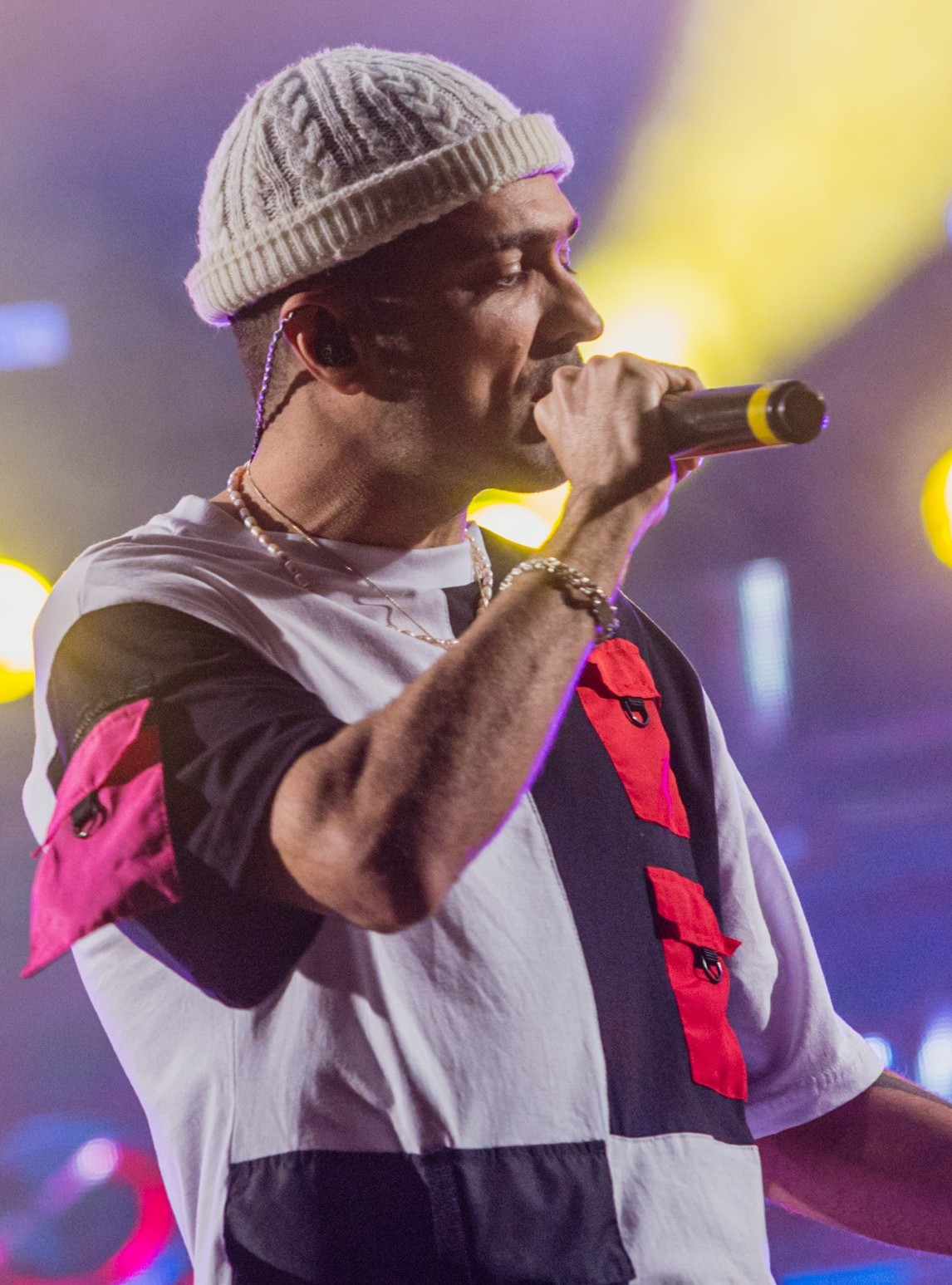
- Don L in 2022

Background information
- Born: Gabriel Linhares da Rocha; 18 January 1981 (age 45); Brasília, Brazil
- Genres: Hip Hop; RnB; Trap
- Occupations: Rapper, activist
- Years active: 2004–present

Gabriel Linhares da Rocha (born 18 January 1981), better known by his artistic name Don L, is a Brazilian rapper and composer. He is considered an influential name in Brazil's rap scene. He, along with Nego Gallo, is one of the creators of the Brazilian rap and hip hop group Costa a Costa, which gained national attention in 2006 for winning the Prêmio Hutúz, at that point the premiere prize for Brazilian hip hop, in the North/Northeast category.

== Discography ==
Plano B & Brigada Sonora de Rua

Year	Mixtape	Ref.
2004	De Costa a Costa	^{[22]}

=== Costa a Costa ===
Year	Mixtape	Ref.
2007	Dinheiro, Sexo, Drogas e Violência de Costa a Costa	

=== Solo career ===
Year	Album	Ref.
2017	Roteiro Pra Aïnouz, Vol. 3	
2021	Roteiro Pra Aïnouz, Vol. 2	
2025	CARO Vapor II - qual a forma de pagamento ?	

Year	Mixtape	Ref.
2013	Caro Vapor/Vida e Veneno de Don L	

Year	Single	Ref.
2015	Verso Livre Nº 1 (Giramundo)	
2016	Chapei (com Laysa)	
2017	Laje das Ilusões	
2018	Verso Livre Nº 2(018)	
2018	Verso Livre/O Mundo É Nosso, Pt. 2 (com Eddu Ferreira)	
2019	Não Escute Meus Raps	
2020	kelefeeling (verso livre)	
2020	Flor da Pele (com Victor Xamã)	
2021	Na Batida da Procura Perfeita	

== Awards and nominations ==
Year	Award	Category	Nominated	Result	Ref.
2021	Prêmio Nacional RAP TV	Best Music	Na Batida da Procura Perfeita	Won	
2021	Prêmio Arcanjo de Cultura	Music	Don L	Won	
2022	MTV Millennial Awards	Album of the Year	Roteiro pra Aïnouz – Don L	Nominated	
