= Froid (rapper) =

Brazilian rapper

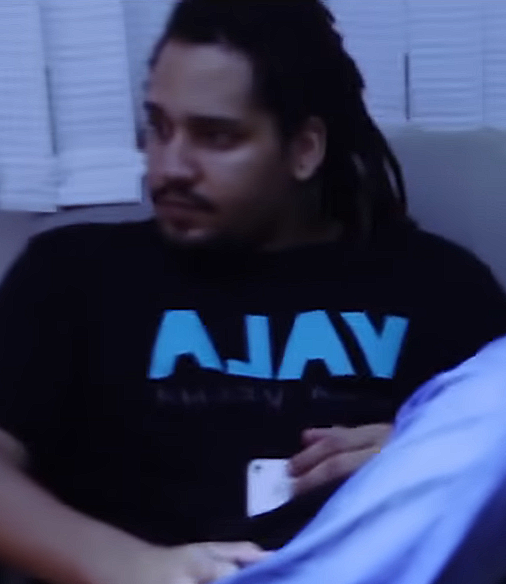

Background information
- Born: Renato Alves Menezes Barreto; September 1, 1993 (age 33); Belo Horizonte
- Origin: Brazil
- Genres: Hip-hop; Freestyle rap
- Occupations: Singer-songwriter, rapper
- Instrument: Vocal
- Years active: 2012–present
- Labels: Novo Egito, UBR Records, Alaska

Renato Alves Menezes Barreto (born September 1, 1993), better known by his stage name Froid, is a Brazilian rapper born in Belo Horizonte, Brazil in 1993. Froid is notably certified Gold for the single "SK8 do Matheus", and 2× Platinum for the single "Lamentável, pt. III" with Cynthia Luz.

== Career ==
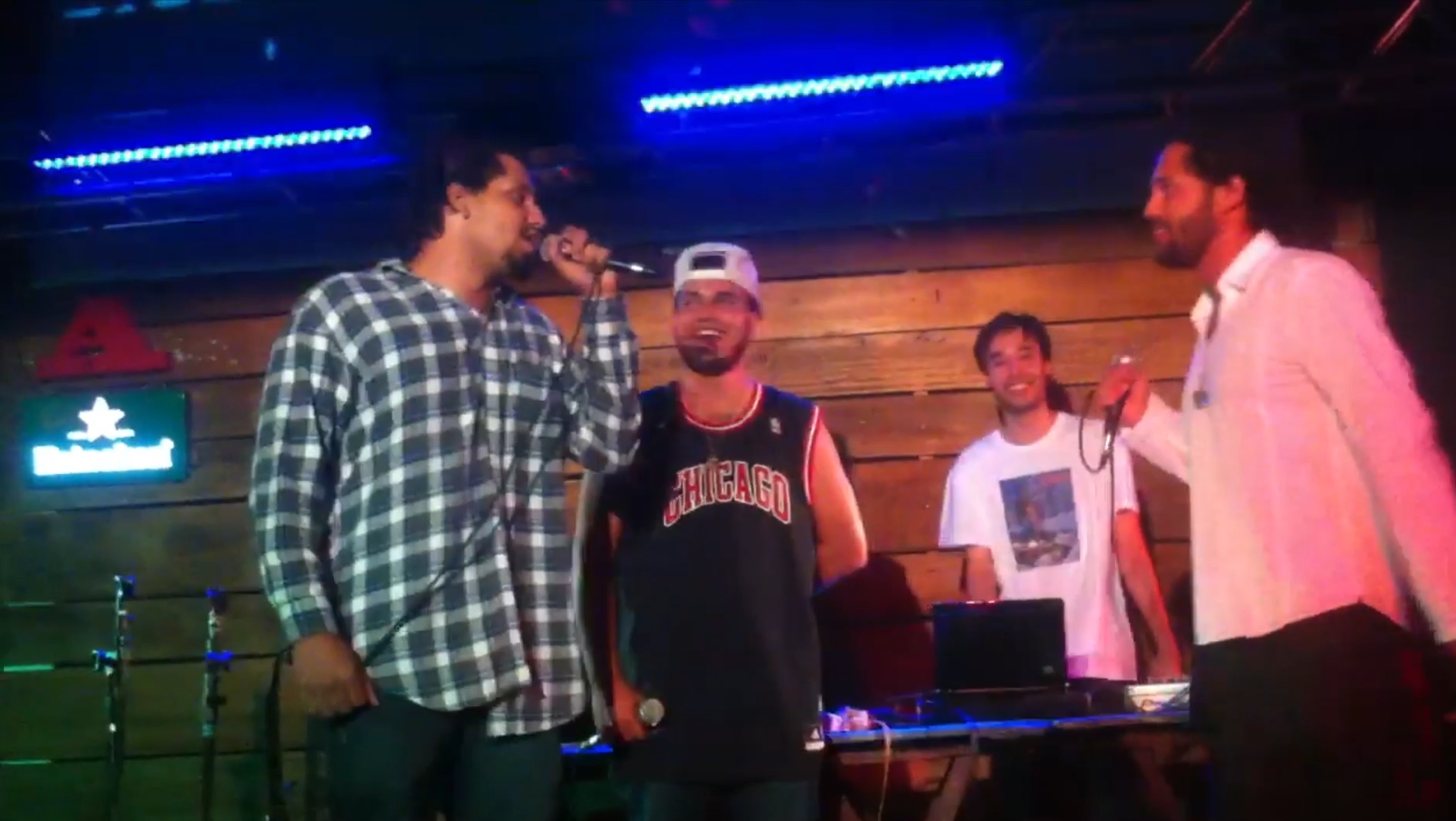
Froid battling another rapper in Brasília along with Emtee Beats as the DJ.

In 2011, Froid founded the hip hop group Um Barril de Rap with two friends. Initially the group's members were Froid himself, Sampa and Yank. After a while, producer Disstinto also joined the group. In 2017, the group disbanded after Yank left, so Froid continued his solo career. While he was a member of the group Um Barril de Rap, Froid also participated in freestyle rap battles, attending Batalha do Neuronio and Batalha do Museu, based at the National Museum of the Republic in Brasília, thus growing in the national rap scene and gaining his notoriety.

In 2017, he aroused controversy by saying that the Earth was flat and NASA lied. In early December 2017, he released a single, titled "Lamentável, pt. III", with Cynthia Luz, which eventually achieved double platinum certification from official body Pro Música Brasil. He also featured on Cynthia Luz's song "Deixa Ela" from her debut album Do Caos ao Nirvana released on December 15 2017.

On December 22 2017, he released his first original solo album, titled O Pior Disco do Ano (lit. "The Worst Album of the Year"). In an interview with Redbull.com, he explained the title as an attempt to provoke people into listening to the album to check for themselves if it was really as bad as the title suggested. In 2018, he released his second solo album, Teoria do Ciclo da Água.

In May 2019, he released a collaboration mixtape with Santzu, titled O Homem Não Para Nunca Vol.1. In early August 2019, Froid and Cynthia Luz released a single titled "Nosso Jeito". Later in the same month, Froid released another single with Cynthia Luz, "Lambada". Its music video was directed by Mark Vales. The song was part of Froid and Luz's future collaboration album.

At some point in their working relationship Froid and Luz became a couple, and in October 2021 they announced the birth of their daughter, Helena. In the summer of 2022, Froid released his eighth album, Gado, and played at the João Rock festival. His audiovisual project "Acústico: O Florista" resulted in a DVD of acoustic versions of Victor Xamã's hits. The DVD was released in 2023.

In August 2023, Froid released a new album titled Mr. Ego (stylised on some platforms and in Froid's official announcement as OgEMr.) with the intention to "put himself back in the Trap scene". It was highly praised by the Brazilian music press and within the rap scene, noting it was a successful creative transformation after the broad appeal of Gado. In early 2024, Luz announced the end of her and Froid's relationship, noting that they remained on good terms as co-parents.

== Nominations and awards ==
Award	Category	Year	Result
MTV MIAW	#Prestatenção	2018	Nominated
Prêmio Genius Brasil de Música	Melhor Musica de Rap	2017	3rd place

== Discography ==
=== Albums with Um Barril de Rap ===
- CD dos Menino (2015)
- 2a Via (2015)

=== Solo albums ===
- O Pior Disco do Ano (2017)
- Teoria do Ciclo da Água (2018)
- Sol (with Cynthia Luz) (2019)
- Oxigênio (Corona Disco) (2020)
- Gado (2022)
- Mr. Ego (also known as OgEMr) (with Ecologyk) (2023)
- O Queridinho de Deus (2024)
- O Veneno do Escorpião (2024)
- O Veneno do Escorpião V.2 (2025)
- Humor Negro (2026)

=== Albums with Makalister: ===
- O Gênio e o Louco “Entre o Céu e a Terra“ (2025)

=== Albums with Orquestra Novo Traço: ===
- Nt Sessions - Froid (2026)

=== Singles ===
- "Lamentável pt. III" (with Cynthia Luz)
- "Lambada"

==== Collaboration songs with Pineapple Storm ====
- "Poesia Acústica #4 - Todo Mundo Odeia Acústico" (2018)
- "Férias em Punta" (2020)
- "Mô-zaico" (2020)
- "Poetas no Topo - Renascimento" (2020)
- "Poesia Acústica Paris" (2020)

=== DVDs ===
- O Florista
