= Batalha da Escada =

Rap event in Brazil

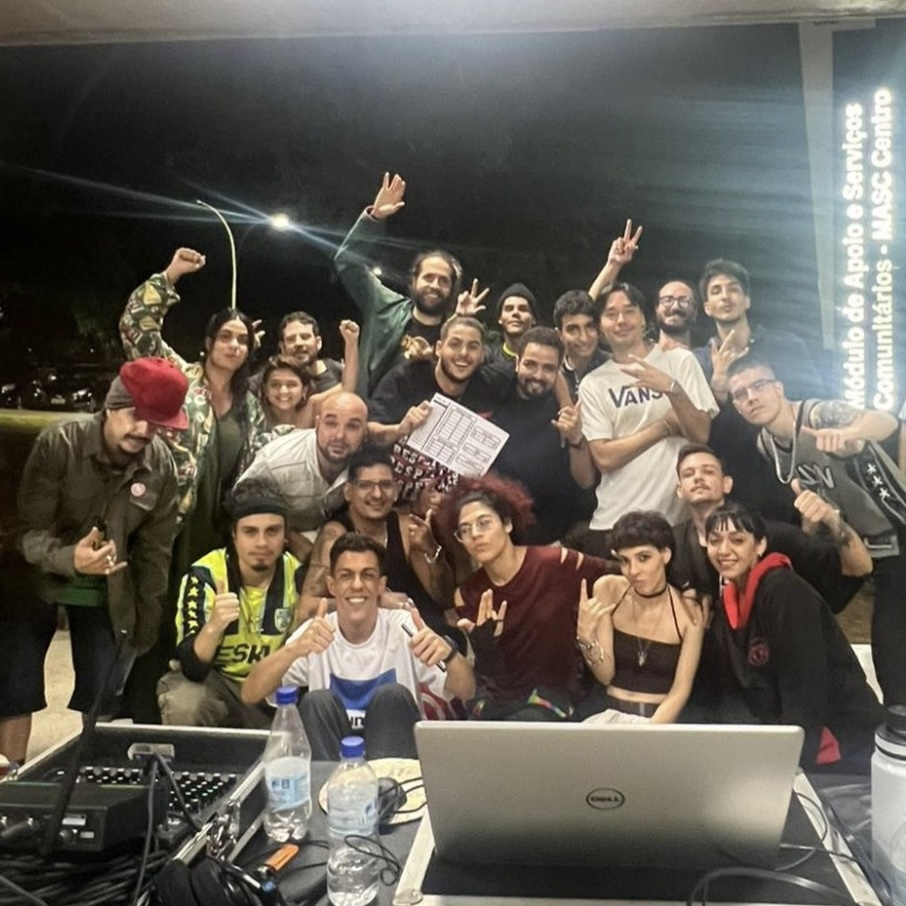
- Genre: Hip hop
- Locations: UnB, Brasília, Brazil
- Years active: 2015-present
- Founders: UnB students

Batalha da Escada is a Brazilian Hip-Hop festival and a Rap battle event that occurs in Brasília, created in 2015 by various UnB students and representatives. These battles are held regularly, on a weekly basis, at the "Teatro de Arena Honestino Guimarães" on UnB's Darcy Ribeiro Campus, located in Brasília, Brazil.

== History ==
In 2015, the Batalha da Escada event was created by several students from the University of Brasília, among them were Stei (Raphael Steigleder), Stroga (Rafael Montenegro), André Henrique and Pedro Além (Pedro Alencar).

In 2018, the event was formalized as a university extension project, by college professor Márcia Marques. Batalha da Escada gave rise to an undergraduate discipline offered by the Faculty of Communication at UnB.

One of Batalha da Escada's most notable features is the presence of many female rappers in its battles.

Prior to the COVID-19 Pandemic, Batalha da Escada events were taking place on a weekly basis, usually at 6:00 pm, at the Teatro de Arena on Campus Darcy Ribeiro of UnB. With the suspension of classes at UnB, established since March 2020, the collective that organizes Batalha da Escada developed a project called "Escada de Casa", which uses Instagram and YouTube to promote records of battles debating and reflecting on varied topics such as health, public policies, hip-hop culture, feminism, black movements, art, social inequalities and mainly debates and critical thinking. Currently, the Batalha da Escada event has returned, and live battles with a present audience are being held regularly again every week at the University of Brasília.

== Format ==
Battles usually start with "odds or evens" to determine which MC will go first. The starting MC will usually have 45 seconds to freestyle rap against the other MC, thus creating an attack. Then the other MC will have 45 seconds to defend by elaborating his freestyle verses. Once the defending MC finishes, this MC will now attack for 45 seconds. Finally, the MC that initiated the battle will have 45 seconds to defend, thus concluding the battle. In case a draw occurs after the first two rounds, a third round shall be issued where both MCs must rhyme in an intercalated format, being that one MC rhymes 8 verses and the other MC rebuttals with 8 verses, the starting MC then rhymes 4 verses and the other MC replies with 4 verses in accordance. During the third round, this intercalated format goes on until the time is up (commonly 45 seconds in duration). The crowd and judges then determine the winning MC.

Rappers who wish to participate in a Batalha da Escada event need to give their names before hand and, normally, about 16 people are selected. In each battle, the MCs are eliminated so that, in the end, the winner is chosen. Usually, the audience chooses a winner, although at times there are also judges present with scorecards. These judges thoroughly analyze each battle and give each MC points based on their lyrical content, flow, presence, punchlines, among others.

== See also ==
- List of hip hop music festivals
- Hip hop culture
- Underground hip hop
