= Nego Gallo =

- Born: Carlos Eduardo da Silva; 20 October 1974 (age 52); Rio de Janeiro, Brazil
- Genre: Rap
- Occupations: Rapper, singer, composer
- Years active: 2005–present

Carlos Eduardo da Silva (born 20 October 1974), better known by his artistic names Nego Gallo or Carlos Gallo, is a Brazilian rapper, singer, and composer. In 2005, he created the rap group Costa a Costa with Don L in Fortaleza, Ceará. The group has won the Prêmio Hutúz, the premier award in Brazilian hip hop, twice. Their mixtape Dinheiro, Sexo, Drogas e Violência de Costa a Costa, released in 2007, sold thousands of homemade copies independently.

His solo mixtape, Carlin voltou, was released by Gallo in 2026 through YouTube. With 4 tracks, the work has as guest appearances Coro MC with musical production, and their collaboration would produce more results.

On 10 January 2019, Nego Gallo released his new solo mixtape Veterano, this time receiving widespread and immediate recognition. The track brings together 11 tracks, produced by Coro MC in Fortaleza and finalized by Léo Grijó in São Paulo. With sounds that include trap, reggae, funk, brega, and cumbia villera, the songs also has guest appearances from Mc Mah, DaGanja, Galf AC (in "Acima de nós só o justo"), Don L (in "No meu nome"), and Coro MC (in "Passado presente"). The album cover Veterano includes photography by Antonello Veneri and art by Filipi Filippo, who has already done the visual art of works by Don L, such as Caro Vapor/Vida e Veneno de Don L and Roteiro Pra Aïnouz, Vol. 3. One of Gallo’s mixtapes, "Downtown", was released exclusively by Red Bull Music.

== Personal life ==
Carlos Gallo came to Fortaleza at a young age, having moved from Rio de Janeiro together with his siblings and mother, a nursing assistant. In the city, he lived in communities that were affected by urban violence. For the recording of Veterano, Gallo rented a shack for 8 months in the seaside community of Goiabeiras, where the studio where he worked with Coro MC was located.

Beginning in 2018, there were 5 murders in front of the location. At that time, Fortaleza was the 7th most violent city in the world according to reports by the Mexican NGO Seguridad, Justicia y Paz and the state of Ceará became the state with the third highest amount of violent deaths in Brazil in the first semester of 2018, with an increase of 39% in violent deaths compared to the same period the year before. When Veterano was released, they had been beset by attacks from criminal organizations, which served as an affront to public institutions.

“I wanted to talk about this city. It's difficult, it's crazy in many places, but we'll live", Gallo said around the time of the mixtape's release. Despite reflecting on these issues, the songs also point to other horizons beyond the violence, with rhythms that are at many points inviting and danceable. "Imagine what it is like for you to be dancing in the middle of a war. But it's...it's what this city taught me", affirmed the rapper.

== Discography ==
- Dinheiro, Sexo, Drogas e Violência de Costa a Costa (mixtape), with Costa a Costa (2007)
- Carlin voltou (mixtape), solo (2016)
- Veterano (mixtape), solo (2019)
