= Batalha do Neuronio =

Rap event in Brazil

Batalha do Neurônio
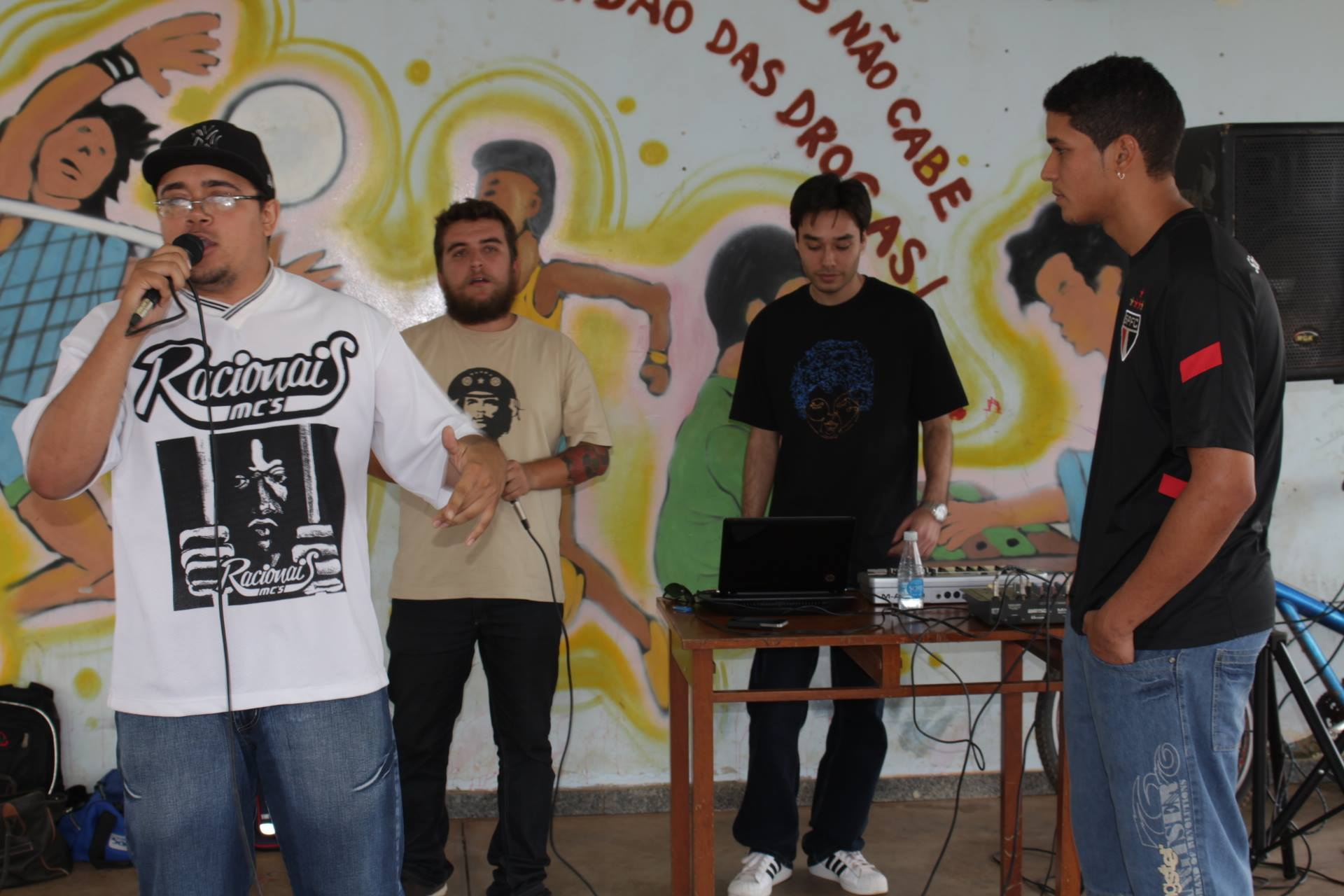
- Genre: Hip hop
- Location: Brasília, Brazil
- Years active: 2012-present
- Founders: Emtee Beats, MC Zen, Biro Ribeiro

Batalha do Neurônio is a cultural collective and an example of a rap battle event that occurs in Brasília, where rappers must freestyle about topics and themes provided by the audience. It is a part of the Brasília hip hop scene, in which the battles are held regularly, on a monthly basis, at Taguatinga park. In addition to being a cultural leisure option for the youth, rap battles contribute to disseminating debates on essential topics, such as sustainability, citizenship, social responsibility, racism, homophobia and prejudice among others.

== History ==
Batalha do Neurônio was created in 2012 by Emtee Beats (Marco Terada) and MC Zen (Gerson Macedo) at Vila Planalto, Brasília. Initially, the Batalha do Neurônio event was known as Raciocínio RAPido and it was the first rap battle to use topics and themes in the freestyle sessions that occur in Brasília. Rap and Hip-Hop events have become instruments to aid and remove young people from the criminal environment in the Federal District and its surroundings.

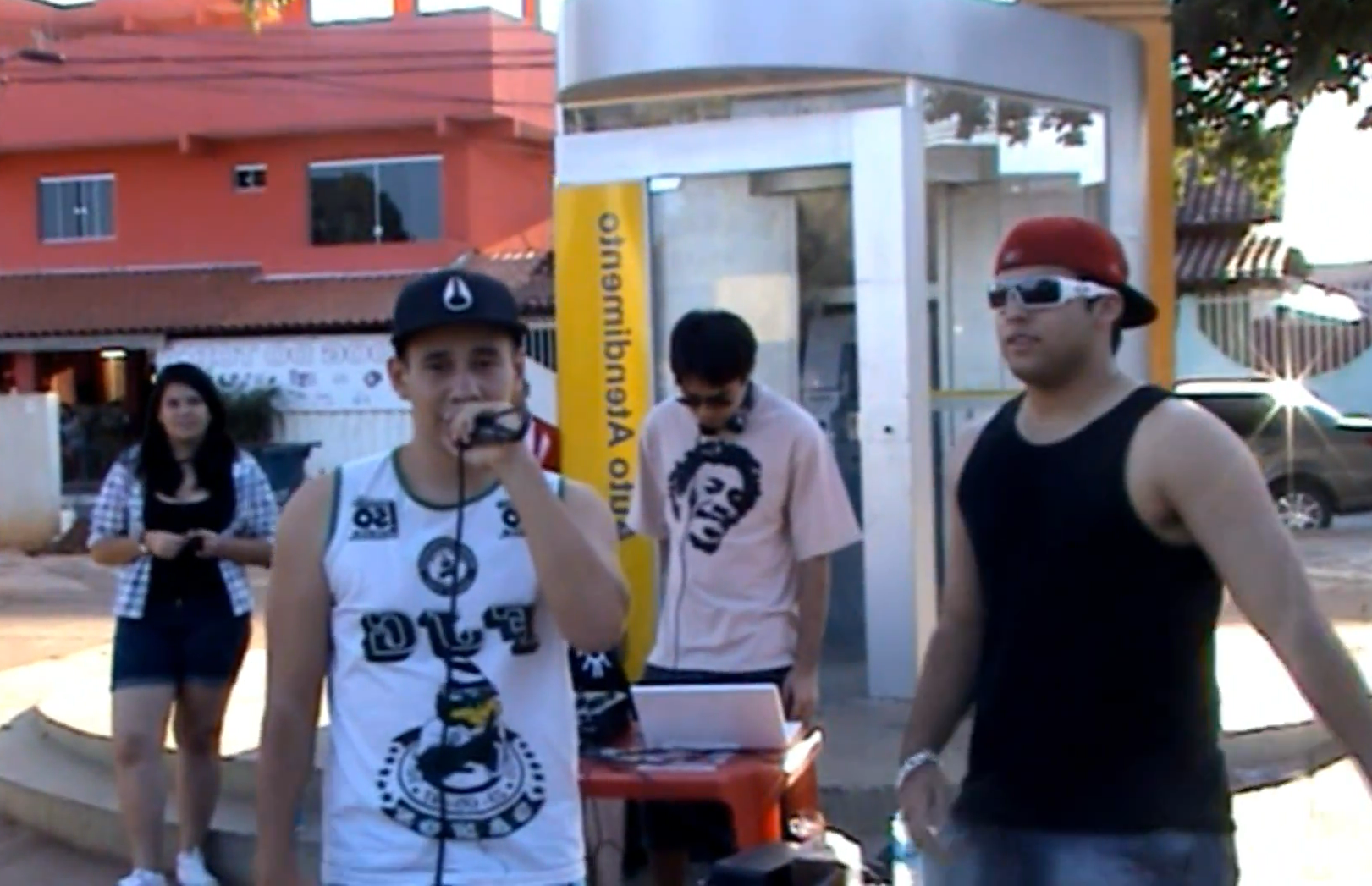
Batalha do Neurônio's first edition with Zen and Emtee Beats.

Furthermore, Batalha do Neurônio is an independent cultural event created by rappers from Brasilia, and the purpose of the event is the periodic realization of freestyle gatherings, which consists of battles between rappers using themes provided by the audience. In May 2012, the first edition of Batalha do Neuronio was held at Praça Nelson Corso, in Vila Planalto, idealized by MC Zen and Emtee. MC Naui joined the organization shortly thereafter. Between May and December 2012, 8 editions were held there, all filmed by Vato Videos. After the first two editions of the Raciocínio RAPido event, a collective was formed to take care of the project, among which Biro Ribeiro and Nauí Paiva embraced the project and changed the name from Raciocínio RAPido to Batalha do Neuronio. After a six-month hiatus, the battle was held again in July 2013, at a new location, Taguaparque, in the park administration marquee. The battle takes place there to the present day on a monthly basis, usually on the last Saturday of the month.

Currently, the main organizer and caretaker of Batalha do Neurônio is Biro Ribeiro. The event aims to help the Brasília community using art as a means of communication and social aggregation.

== Format ==
The purpose of the Batalha do Neurônio event was to become the first periodic knowledge based battle in Brasília. Knowledge battles differ from so-called blood battles. In the knowledge (battle model idealized in Rio de Janeiro by MC Marechal) the rapper rhymes about themes provided by the audience itself, taking into account topics that the spectators may suggest. The same audience also decides the battle's winner, analyzing the rappers' lyrical content and creativity, among other aspects, such as flow, resourcefulness, charisma, etc. In many battles there is also the presence of judges who also have the power to vote on the winner of the battle.

== DJs ==
Batalha do Neurônio functions in partnership with several DJs and beatmakers, who are responsible for the beats and instrumentals used during the battles and freestyle sessions. Often DJs will also play music to get the crowd going during breaks in between battles. The most active beatmaker of the Batalha do Neurônio event was Emtee Beats, who participated in several editions and events from 2012 to 2016. During that time, Emtee played beats of varied musical rhythms in the Hip Hop genre that many times matched appropriately with the themes proposed by the audience during the MC battles.

== Social Projects ==
Batalha do Neuronio promotes events held at Taguaparque, concerts by local artists linked to Hip-Hop culture and poetic presentations/interventions. The Batalha do Neuronio event began receiving invitations for cultural interventions in the most diverse places, such as public and private schools, colleges, universities, shopping malls, shelters and public daycare centers, rehabilitation institutions and hospitals, congresses and national conferences. Soon, Batalha do Neurônio was present at large events such as TedX at UnB, ENEJ (National Meeting of Junior Entrepreneurs), The Street Store Brasília, FECUCA (Festival de Curtas da Faculdade de Comunicação), the 32nd Book Fair in Brasília, Festival dos Mc's at Juiz de Fora – MG, Joint Conference on Human Rights, Copa das Quebradas, Abramente, IV Exhibition of Primary Health Care, among others.

During this period, three editions of Rap Solidarity were organized, which is a non-profit, charity event, with the aim of collecting food and clothing for public day care centers located in needy communities in the Federal District and surroundings. There is also a partnership with the Spread Words project, which aims to access and disseminate literature and poetry, and donations of books and comics were made at these locations. There was also Rapgol, a charity indoor soccer tournament, also designed with the objective of collecting supplies for various donations. Batalha do Neurônio identified the opportunity to demonstrate the potential of Hip Hop culture and freestyles in any environment, for any audience. In the battles, the most diverse topics are addressed and there is a remarkable interaction with the public, who actively participate in the battle and frequently provide their opinion. It can be noted that Batalha do Neuronio's goal is to continue conquering new spaces in the most varied events and institutions and to continue on the streets, promoting the occupation of public spaces with culture, music, poetry and Hip Hop. One of the goals of the Batalha do Neuronio collective is to bring the culture of rap freestyling to different audiences, in schools, colleges, rehabilitation centers, hospitals, shelters, day care centers, parties, concerts, conventions, fairs and congresses. In addition to the MC battles, Batalha do Neuronio also promotes rhyming workshops and charitable actions such as book and comic book donations to encourage literature. To democratize access to culture for people who don't have financial conditions, Batalha do Neuronio invests in the occupation of public space, with art and culture, spreading, in free events, the elements and ideals of hip hop. The activities promoted by the group serve as a stage for independent artists to show their work, often in pocket shows, in “open mic” events.

== Pandemic ==
Prior to the COVID-19 pandemic, the Batalha do Neuronio events were taking place on a monthly basis in Taguatinga.

== See also ==
- List of hip hop music festivals
- Hip hop culture
- Underground hip hop
