= Dina Di =

Brazilian rapper (1976–2010)

Background information
- Birth name: Viviane Lopes Matias
- Born: 19 February 1976; Campinas
- Died: 19 March 2010 (aged 34)
- Genres: rap
- Instrument: vocals
- Member of: Visão de Rua

Dina Di, stage name of Viviane Lopes Matias (19 February 1976 – São Paulo, 19 March 2010) was a Brazilian rapper and lead singer of the group Visão de Rua.

== Life ==
Di was born in 1976 in Campinas when she was called Viviane Lopes Matias. She had a difficult upbringing. Her father choked to death in a bar and her mother was cruelly murdered. She was first known as Dina Di when she was thirteen.

She joined the hip hop group of Visão de Rua. Other members were Tum and DJ OG and their first single was titled, "Confidência de uma conviceira" (Confidence of a Convict). Di had been to prison before and her music was now contained in her lyrics about her struggles against society's inertia. She would perform in women's jails offering hope to the inmates.

The songs that she is known for include "Mente Engatilhada", "Confidências de uma Presidiária" and "Irmã de Cela". She was referred to as the "Queen of National Rap" in Brazil. She and Visão de Rua were recognised as the best female rap group at the 2000 and the 2001 Hutúz Award ceremony.

Di did not use her gender to sell her music. She was known for not wearing close fitting clothing and she used her worlds to address issues including the way women are expected to dress and behave and the music industry's sexual exploitation.

== Death and legacy ==
She died in São Paulo on 19 March 2010 after catching an infection, having given birth to a daughter on 2 March.

Brazilian rap artist Issa Paz performs lyrics that pay tribute to Dina Di and other early female rap artists in Brazil.

46 years after her death and on her birthday she was featured as a Google Doodle. She was chosen because she was a role model for rap in Brazil.
