= RAPadura Xique-Chico =

Brazilian rapper and composer

Rapadura
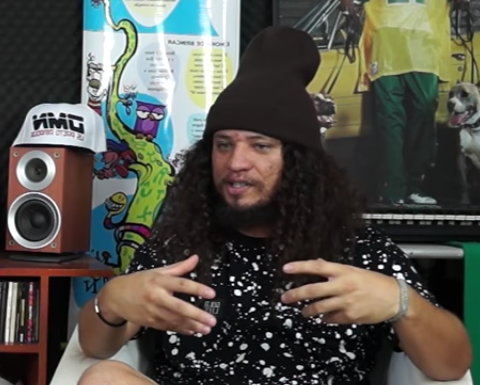
- Brazilian rapper Rapadura

Background information
- Born: Francisco Igor Almeida do Santos; 1984 (age 41–42)
- Origin: Fortaleza, Ceará, Brazil
- Genre: Hip hop
- Occupations: Rapper, composer
- Years active: 1998–present
- Label: Nibiru Recordz

Francisco Igor Almeida do Santos (born 1984), better known by his stage name RAPadura Xique-Chico or simply Rapadura, is a Brazilian rapper and composer. He is considered to be a pioneer in successfully blending Hip-Hop music with Forró. In 2020, Rapadura was nominated for the Latin Grammy award.

== Biography ==
Francisco was born in Lagoa Seca, a village in the municipality of Fortaleza, Ceará. At the age of thirteen, he migrated with his family to the city of Brasília, in the Federal District. His nickname comes from rapadura, Francisco's favorite sweet. He used to eat a jar of rapadura after playing soccer with his friends. Inspired by Brazilian northeastern music and dance rhythms such as embolada, repente, coco, maracatu, capoeira, cantigas de roda, baião and forró plus other genres such as jazz, soul, funk and samba-rock, Rapadura began composing at just 14 years old, writing about themes which reflected the nostalgia he felt for Brazil's northeastern region and his hometown.

In 2006, Rapadura recorded his first notable song, rhyming on the track "A Quem Possa Interessar" from the CD Aviso às Gerações, by brasiliense rapper GOG, thus marking the beginning of his trajectory in the Brazilian Hip Hop scene. From then on, he became known throughout the country, eventually winning the 2007 "Prêmio Hutuz" award in the category "Group or Solo Artist from North/Northeast". Two years later, he was nominated in the same award as one of the three best singers/groups of two regions in the decade. In 2010, using a mix of rap with northeastern rhythms, Rapadura independently released his first project, entitled Fita Embolada do Engenho – Rapadura na Boca do Povo. Basically, it is a mixtape containing 8 tracks, including the single "Maracatu de Cá pra Lá". On May 16, 2010, he appeared on the Brazilian TV show "Manos e Minas", on the TV Cultura channel.

Rapadura is also known in the musical scene for commonly wearing a straw hat and sandals, usually accompanied by a simple outfit, typical of where he was born. He created several catchphrases that became popular, among them "Oxente, é arrente!" On September 11, 2012, he released an independent single called "Monstro do Ceará". In 2016, he was featured in the song "Reza Vela / Norte-Nordeste Me Veste" on the album "Acústico Oficina Francisco Brennand", by Brazilian band O Rappa.

In 2017, Rapadura collaborated with singer Adriana Sanchez from Brazilian group Barra da Saia in a live show in São Paulo at the Itaú Cultural theatre, clearly displaying his unique mixture of Hip-Hop music and elements of the "Nordeste" culture.

== Discography ==
- 2008 – Amor Popular (mixtape)
- 2010 – Fita Embolada do Engenho - Rapadura na Boca do Povo (mixtape)
- 2020 – Universo do Canto Falado (album released by Nibiru Recordz)

== Awards ==
- 2020 Latin Grammy Award (nominated for Best Rock or Alternative Music Album in the Portuguese Language)
