= Emicida =

Brazilian musician

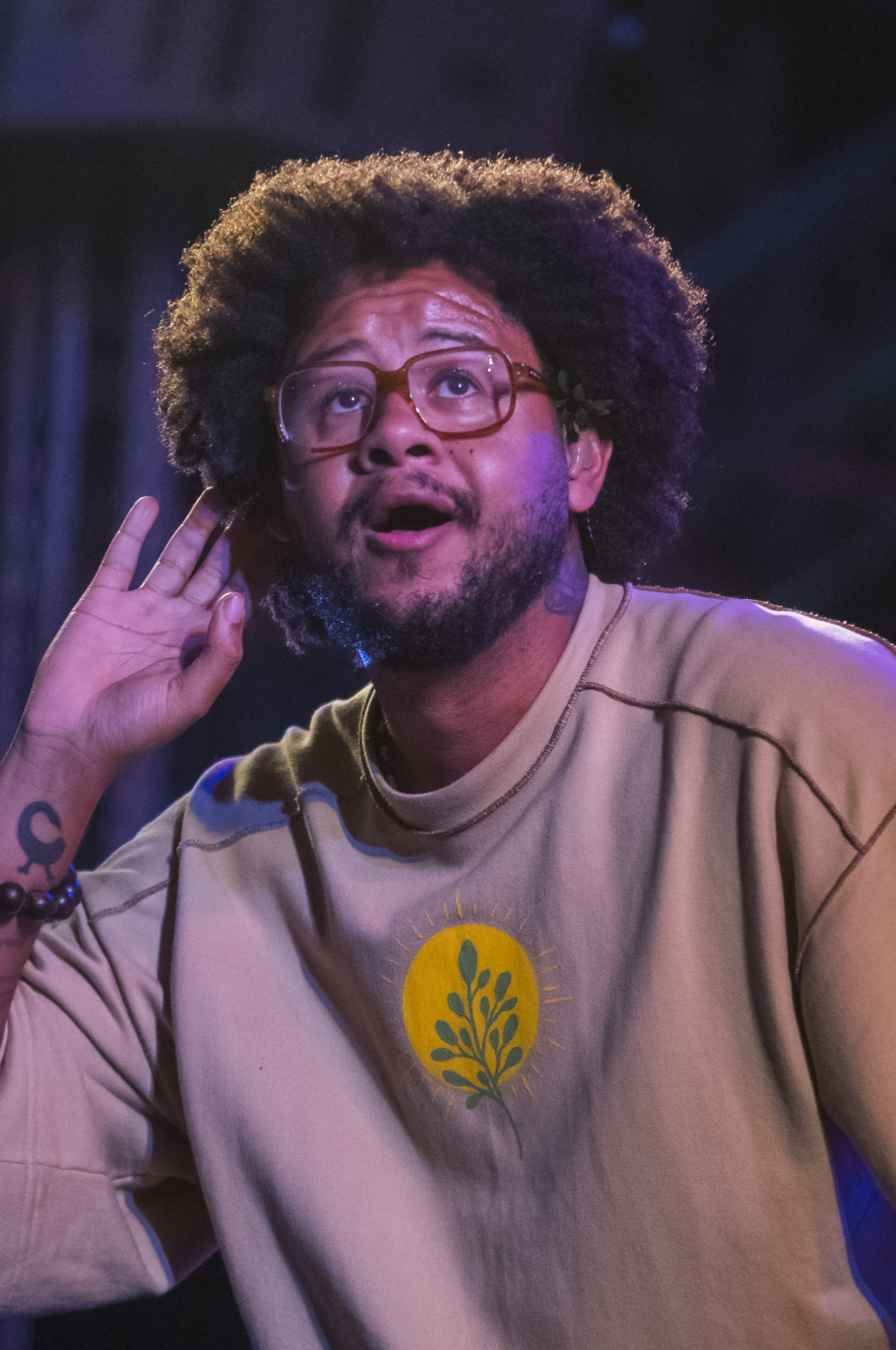
- Emicida in 2020

Background information
- Born: Leandro Roque de Oliveira; August 17, 1985 (age 41); São Paulo, São Paulo, Brazil
- Genres: Hip hop; MPB
- Occupations: Rapper; singer; songwriter
- Years active: 2005–present
- Label: Laboratório Fantasma
- Partner: Marina Santa Helena
- Website: emicida.com

Leandro Roque de Oliveira (born August 17, 1985), better known by his stage name Emicida, is a Brazilian rapper, singer, songwriter and MC.

The rapper is known for his impromptu rhymes, that made him one of the most respected MCs in Brazil. Regarded as one of the biggest successes of underground hip hop in his country, Emicida has garnered a large audience across many platforms.

== Personal life ==
Leandro was born into a poor family. He composed rhymes and passed them to his friend to record and sell. His father died when Leandro was still a child, as told in the song "Ooorra ..." He is married to the presenter and podcaster of Um Milkshake Chamado Wanda - Marina Santa Helena.

His younger brother, Evandro Roque de Oliveira is a well-known rapper, music producer, songwriter, artistic director, businessman and speaker under the stage name Evandro Fióti. He and Emicida co-founded the music label Laboratório Fantasma in 2009 (at the time it was still known as Na Humilde Crew) and Fioti is currently the CEO of the label (which in addition to the two, has other well-known artists as part of the label, such as Rael, Drik Barbosa and Kamau).

== Name ==
The name Emicida is a portmanteau of the words Emcee and homicide. Because of his frequent victories in the battles of improvisation, his friends began to say that Leandro was a "killer", who kills his opponents through rhymes. Later, the rapper turned it into an acronym for "Enquanto Minha Imaginação Compuser Insanidades, Domino a Arte" (rough translation, As long as my imagination composes insanities, I dominate the art).

== Career ==
Live performances are accompanied by the DJ instrumental in Nyack. Emicida's career began in the early 1990, when his parents organized black dances in the outskirts of São Paulo, and he began to use the equipment and write his first rhymes.

Emicida is known for songs such as "Rua Augusta" and "Zica, Vai Lá". He composed tracks for the soundtrack of Rockstar Games' Max Payne 3.

His style is influenced by many Brazilian rappers as well as US names including Mos Def, Wu-Tang Clan, and the Fugees.

His album AmarElo was considered one of the 25 best Brazilian albums of the second half of 2019 by the São Paulo Association of Art Critics. His song "Levanta e Anda", featuring Rael, was featured in the FIFA 15 soundtrack, while "Bonjour", featuring Féfé was on the soundtrack of NBA 2K16. The album AmarElo won a 2020 Latin Grammy Award for Best Portuguese Language Rock or Alternative Album.

His song "A Chapa É Quente!", also featuring Rael, was nominated for the 2017 Latin Grammy Award for Best Urban Song. In 2021, his song with Ivete Sangalo "Mulheres Não Têm Que Chorar" was nominated for the same award in the Best Portuguese Language Song category.

== Discography ==
=== Studio albums ===
- O Glorioso Retorno de Quem Nunca Esteve Aqui (2013)
- Sobre Crianças, Quadris, Pesadelos e Lições de Casa... (2015)
- Língua Franca (2017)
- AmarElo (2019)

=== Mixtapes ===
- Pra Quem Já Mordeu Um Cachorro Por Comida, Até Que Eu Cheguei Longe... (2009)
- Emicídio (2010)

=== Extended plays ===
- Sua Mina Ouve Meu Rep Tamém (2010)
- Doozicabraba e a Revolução Silenciosa (2011)

=== Singles ===
- 2008: "Triunfo"
- 2009: "E.M.I.C.I.D.A"
- 2010: "Avua Besouro"
- 2010: "Emicídio"
- 2010: "Velhos Amigos" (produced by Skeeter Beats)
- 2011: "Rua Augusta"
- 2011: "Então Toma!"
- 2011: "Viva"
- 2011: "Ainda Ontem"
- 2011: "Eu Gosto Dela"
- 2012: "Zica, Vai Lá!"
- 2012: "Dedo Na Ferida"
- 2013: "Crisântemo"
- 2013: "Gueto (feat MC Guimê)"
- 2013: "Hoje Cedo (feat Pitty)"
- 2015: "Boa Esperança (feat J. Ghetto)"
- 2015: "Passarinhos (feat Vanessa da Mata)"
- 2018: "Pantera Negra"
- 2018: "Hacia el Amor"
