= 1983 in Latin music =

This is a list of notable events in Latin music (music from the Spanish- and Portuguese-speaking areas of Latin America, Latin Europe, and the United States) that took place in 1983.

== Events ==
- February 23 – Machito wins the Grammy Award for Best Latin Recording at the 25th Annual Grammy Awards for Machito and His Salsa Big Band '82..
- May 15 – Rita Lee concludes her Tour Brasil 83 as the first Brazilian artist to carry out a tour in stadiums and arenas, with a record audience of 500,000 attendees.
- June 12 – Puerto Rican boy band Menudo appear at Madison Square Garden in New York, quickly selling out the venue.
- June 18 – The National Academy of Recording Arts and Sciences announces that the Grammy Award for Latin music would be split into three separate categories: Best Latin Pop Performance, Best Mexican/Mexican-American Performance, and Best Tropical Latin Performance.
- July 1 – Chilean Band Los Prisioneros debut at the Miguel Leon Prado High School Song festival, personifying the rebellion of young Chileans living under Augusto Pinochet's regime.
- October 29 – The 12th OTI Festival, held at the DAR Constitution Hall in Washington, D.C., United States, is won by the song "Estrela de papel", written by Jessé and Elifas Andreato, and performed by Jessé himself representing Brazil.

== Notable singles ==
- Azul y Negro: ""No Tengo Tiempo (Con los Dedos de una Mano)" (#1 Spain)
- Luis Miguel: "Directo al corazón" (#1 in Mexico, #1 in Argentina)
- Menudo: "Claridad" (#1 in Mexico)
- Amanda Miguel: "Castillos" (#1 in Mexico)
- Rocío Dúrcal: "Tienes que ser cruel" (#1 in Mexico)
- Yuri: "Yo te amo, te amo" (#1 in Mexico)
- Daniela Romo: "Mentiras" (#1 in Mexico)
- Daniela Romo: "Celos" (#1 in Mexico)
- Juan Gabriel: "Caray" (#1 in Mexico)
- Tino Casal: "Embrujada" (#1 in Spain)
- Azul y Negro: "No Tengo Tiempo (Con los Dedos de una Mano)"
- Pimpinela: "Olvídame y Pega la Vuelta" (#1 in Argentina, #1 in Spain)

== Album releases ==
- Los Huracanes del Norte: Las Paredes de Mi Casa
- Plácido Domingo: Siempre en Mi Corazón — Always in My Heart
- José José: Secretos
- Roberto Carlos: Roberto Carlos' 83/Concavo y Conexo
- Rita Lee: Baila Conmigo and Bombom
- José Feliciano: Me Enamoré
- Lani Hall: Lani
- José Luis Rodríguez: Ven
- Juan Gabriel: Todo
- Tito Puente and His Latin Ensemble: On Broadway
- Willie Colón: Corazón Guerrero
- Rubén Blades: El Que la Hace la Paga
- Mongo Santamaría: Mongo Magic
- Ray Barretto, Celia Cruz, and Adalberto Santiago: Tremendo Trío
- Charly García: Clics modernos
- Wilfrido Vargas: El Funcionario
- Miami Sound Machine: A Toda Maquina
- Yolandita Monge: Sueños
- Lucía Méndez: Enamorada
- Los Caminantes: Número Tres
- Rocío Jurado: Desde Dentro
- Pimpinela: Hermanos
- Guillermo Dávila: Un poco de amor
- Daniela Romo: Daniela Romo
- Camilo Sesto: Amanecer/84
- Julio Iglesias: En concierto
- La Sonora Ponceña: Future
- Menudo: A Todo Rock
- Menudo: Reaching Out
- Menudo: Feliz Navidad
- Massiel: Corazón de Hierro
- Ángela Carrasco: Unidos
- Rocío Dúrcal: Entre tú y yo
- Willie Chirino: Subiendo
- La Mafia: Mafia Mania
- Alberto Cortez: Gardel...Como Yo Te Siento
- Los Yonic's: Con Amor
- Mocedades: La música
- Los Caminantes: Supe Perder
- Los Caminantes: Especialmente Para Usted
- El Gran Combo de Puerto Rico: Universidad de la Salsa
- Milly y los Vecinos: Nostalgia
- Milly y los Vecinos: Avant Garde
- Conjunto Libre: Ritmo Sonido y Estilo
- Anthony Ríos: Anthony Ríos
- Wilkins: Completamente Vivo
- Raphy Leavitt & su Orquesta La Selecta: Siempre Alegre
- La Revolución de Emiliano Zapata: La Fuerza de Tu Amor
- Johnny Pacheco and Pete "El Conde" Rodríguez: De Nuevo Los Compadres
- Oscar D'León: El Sabor de Oscar
- Oscar D'León: Con Dulzura
- Lorenzo Antonio: Busco un Amor
- Lucecita Benítez: Criollo Folklore
- Hugo Blanco: De Fiesta
- Ricchi e Poveri: Mamma Maria
- Andy Montañez: Hoy... y Ayer
- Andy Montañez: Tania y Andy
- Sergio y Estíbaliz: Agua
- Raphael: Enamorado de la Vida
- Bonny Cepeda: El Mandamás
- Francisco: Cariño mío
- Crystal: Suavemente
- Luis "Perico" Ortiz: Entre Amigos
- Los Ángeles Negroes: Locamente Mía
- Alfredo "Chocolate" Armenteros: Chocolate En Sexteto
- El Combo de Ayer: Aquel Gran Encuentro
- Jossie Esteban y la Patrulla 15: Deja ese Diablo
- Isabel Pantoja: Cambiar por ti
- Jeanette: Reluz
- Juan Pardo and Rocío Jurado: Caballo de Batalla
- Little Joe: Roots
- Little Joe: No Quiero Más Amar
- Ramón Ayala y Los Bravos del Norte:En Amo de la Musica Norteña
- La Mafia: Electrifying
- Johnny Ventura: Flying High
- Willie Colón and Héctor Lavoe: Vigilante
- Ismael Quintana and Papo Lucca: Mucho talento
- Herb Alpert: Noche de Amor
- Lolita Flores: Águila Real
- Alex & Orquesta Liberación: Cómo Quisiera
- Tony Croatto: Tony Croatto y Tu Pueblo
- Lupita D'Alessio: Sentimiento al Desnudo
- Grupo Pegasso: Él No Te Quiere
- Nydia Caro: Nydia Caro
- Glenn Monroig: Hola
- Miguel Bosé: Made in Spain
- Aidita Aviles and Felipe Rodríguez: Por Primera Vez
- Los Humildes: Chulita
- Beatriz Adriana: Con el Canto en las Venas
- Dyango: Bienvenido al club
- Lissette: Lissette
- José María Napoleón: Tiempo al Tiempo
- Amanda Miguel: El Último Sonido, Vol. II
- Los Hermanos Rosario: Los Hermanos Rosario
- Los Muecas: Y Quién es Ese Tonto
- Emmanuel: En la soledad
- Cuco Valoy: El Congo de Oro
- Los Cadetes de Linares: Monterrey Como Has Crecido
- Basilio: Basilio (1983)
- La Sonora Dinamita: Terremoto Tropical
- Sandra Zaiter: De Pie Sigue La Esperanza
- Alberto Cortez: Como el Primer Día
- Glenn Monroig: A Mi Manera
- René Farrait: Mi Música
- Vicentico Valdés and Bobby Valentín: En La Lejania
- Laura Canales: Esta Sed Que Tengo
- Willie Rosario: The Salsa Machine
- Luis Miguel: Decídete
- Mecano: ¿Dónde está el país de las hadas?
- La Trinca: ¿Quesquesé Se Merdé?
- Miguel Ríos: El Rock De Una Noche De Verano
- Joan Manuel Serrat: Cada loco con su tema
- Juan Pardo: Caballo De Batalla
- Mocedades: La Música
- Los Violadores: Los Violadores
- Diomedes Díaz and Colacho Mendoza: Cantando
- Rubén Rada: En familia
- Gang 90 & Absurdettes: Essa Tal de Gang 90 & Absurdettes
- Rita Lee: Bombom
- Chico Buarque and Edu Lobo: O Grande Circo Mistico
- Lulu Santos: O Ritmo do Momento
- Ritchie: Voo de Coração
- Eduardo Dussek: Cantando no Banheiro
- Itamar Assumpção: Às Próprias Custas S.A
- Os Paralamas do Sucesso: Cinema Mudo
- Nana Caymmi and César Camargo Mariano: Voz e Suor
- Blitz: Radioatividade
- Rumo: Diletantismo
- Camisa de Vênus: Camisa de Vênus

== Births ==
- August 22 – Nacho, Venezuelan reggaeton, member of Chino & Nacho
- September 17 – Jennifer Peña, Mexican pop and norteño singer
- November 6 – Gisela João, Portuguese fado singer
- December 13 – J Álvarez, Puerto Rican reggaeton singer

== Deaths ==
- September 15 – Willie Bobo, Puerto Rican/American jazz percussionist, 49 {cancer)
