= 15 Éxitos Vol. 2 =

Greatest hits album by Los Caminantes
- Released: 1985
- Genre: Regional Mexican
- Length: 45:53
- Label: Luna

Los Caminantes chronology
| Porque Tengo Tu Amor (1984) | 15 Éxitos Vol. 2 (1985) | Cada Dia Mejor (1985) |

15 Éxitos Vol. 2 is a compilation album by Mexican group Los Caminantes, released in 1985 on Luna Records. It is the second of a three volume greatest hits collection from their Supe Perder, Especialmente Para Usted, and Numero Tres albums.

== Track listing ==
| No. | Title | Writer(s) | Length |
|---|---|---|---|
| 1. | "Paloma Negra" | Tomás Méndez | 3:18 |
| 2. | "Las Gaviotas" | Manuel Esquivel | 3:33 |
| 3. | "Ramita De Matimba" | Rosendo Martínez | 2:40 |
| 4. | "Tuyo Sere" | Horacio Ramírez | 3:08 |
| 5. | "Te Vas o Te Quedas" | José Alfredo Jiménez | 3:17 |
| 6. | "Palomita Mensajera" | Agustín Ramírez | 3:01 |
| 7. | "Hace Un Año" | Felipe Valdez Leal | 2:49 |
| 8. | "Cobardemente" | Hermanos Martínez Gil | 2:34 |
| 9. | "La Cama De Piedra" | Cuco Sánchez | 3:06 |
| 10. | "La Carcel De Cananea" | Luis Pérez Meza | 4:00 |
| 11. | "Cumbia Del Sol" | Héctor Quintero | 3:03 |
| 12. | "Teresita" | Martín Ramírez | 2:55 |
| 13. | "Solo Estoy" | Brígido Ramírez | 3:20 |
| 14. | "Aquella Joven" | Horacio Ramírez | 3:14 |
| 15. | "Vuela Paloma" | Gozina y Cherubine | 3:11 |
