= 15 Éxitos Vol. 3 =

Greatest hits album by Los Caminantes
- Released: 1987
- Genre: Regional Mexican
- Length: 45:02
- Label: Luna

Los Caminantes chronology
De Guanajuato...Para America! (1986)	15 Éxitos Vol. 3 (1987)	Gracias Martin (1987)

15 Éxitos Vol. 3 is a compilation album by Mexican group Los Caminantes, released in 1987 on Luna Records. It is the third of a three volume greatest hits collection from their Corridos Al Estilo De Los Caminantes, Porque Tengo Tu Amor, Cada Dia Mejor, and De Guanajuato...Para America! albums.

== Track listing ==
No.	Title	Writer(s)	Length
1.	"Amor Sin Palabras"	Federico y Francisco Curiel	3:22
2.	"Porque Tengo Tu Amor"		3:20
3.	"Tristes Recuerdos"	Agustín y Brígido Ramírez	3:01
4.	"Una Noche"	Agustín Ramírez	3:04
5.	"Robaste Mi Amor"	Horacio Ramírez	3:02
6.	"Volar, Volar"	Agustín Ramírez	3:00
7.	"Lloraremos Los Dos"	Fernando Z. Maldonado	2:59
8.	"Porque"	Brígido Ramírez	3:49
9.	"Cuando Te Vuelva A Encontrar"	Horacio Ramírez	3:07
10.	"Dos Flores, Dos Amores"	Agustín y Brígido Ramírez	3:24
11.	"Tu Mirada"	José Ángel Medina	2:58
12.	"Baila Mi Cumbia"		2:55
13.	"Quiero Que Sepas"		3:35
14.	"Mi Ultima Parranda"		2:58
15.	"La Muerte De La Mafia"	Abel De Luna	3:08
