= 1st Brazilian Music Awards =

1988 Brazilian Music Awards

- Date: 31 May 1988
- Location: Hotel Nacional; Rio de Janeiro, Rio de Janeiro, Brazil
- Hosted by: Eva Wilma

Highlights
- Most awards: Marina Lima and Tom Jobim (3 each)

The 1st Brazilian Music Awards (Portuguese: 1.° Prêmio da Música Brasileira), known as the Sharp Music Awards (Portuguese: Prêmio Sharp de Música), took place on 31 May 1988, at the Hotel Nacional in Rio de Janeiro. Sponsored by Sharp Corporation, it recognized the Brazilian music of 1987. The ceremony was hosted by actress Eva Wilma. The poet Vinicius de Moraes was honored at the ceremony.

== Background and ceremony ==
The Brazilian Music Awards was founded in 1987 by Grupo Machline's José Maurício Machline. Sponsored by Sharp Corporation, it was originally known as the Sharp Music Awards. The first award ceremony was held on 31 May 1988 at the Hotel Nacional in Rio de Janeiro for achievements in Brazilian music in 1987. The ceremony was hosted by actress Eva Wilma. Malu Mader, Cláudia Magno, Débora Bloch, Carla Camurati, Lúcia Veríssimo, Beth Goulart, Glória Pires, Lucinha Lins and Bruna Lombardi presented awards. The poet Vinicius de Moraes was honored with a performance by Gal Costa, Toquinho, Sandra de Sá, Beth Carvalho, Elizeth Cardoso, Leny Andrade, Emílio Santiago, Marina Lima, Edu Lobo, Carlos Lyra, Marília Medalha, Maria Creuza, Baden Powell, Djavan and Caetano Veloso.

== Winners ==
The following awards were given.

=== Brazilian popular music (MPB) ===
Best Male Singer: Milton Nascimento	Best Female Singer: Gal Costa
Best Group: MPB4	Best Male New Artist: Vitor Hugo
Best Female New Artist: Loly	Best Arranger: Dori Caymmi
Best Song: "Passarim" – Tom Jobim; Tom Jobim, songwriter	Best Album: Tom Jobim – Tom Jobim

=== Children's ===
Best Song: "Imaginem" – Toquinho; Toquinho, songwriter	Best Album: Canção de Todas as Crianças – Toquinho

=== Classical ===
Best Album
- Orquestra Sinfônica Brasileira
  - Isaac Karabtchevsky, conductor

=== Instrumental ===
Best Soloist: Turibio Santos	Best Group: Hermeto Pascoal Grupo
Best Arranger: Sivuca; Rildo Hora	Best Album: Heitor Villa-Lobos: Obra Completa para Violão – Turibio Santos

=== Pop/Rock ===
Best Male Singer: Cazuza	Best Female Singer: Marina Lima
Best Group: Legião Urbana	Best Male New Artist: Nei Lisboa
Best Female New Artist: Via Negromonte	Best Arranger: Nico Rezende
Best Song: "Preciso Dizer Que Te Amo" – Marina Lima; Cazuza, Dé Palmeira and Bebel Gilberto, songwriters	Best Album: Virgem – Marina Lima

=== Popular Song ===
Best Male Singer: Jessé	Best Female Singer: Rosana
Best Group: Roupa Nova	Best New Artist: Claudia Matarazzo
Best Arranger: Lincoln Olivetti	Best Song: "Chuvas de Verão" – José Augusto; Antônio José, songwriter
Best Album: Sábado – José Augusto

=== Regional ===
Best Male Singer: Dominguinhos	Best Female Singer: Maria Inês
Best Group: Chiclete com Banana	Best Male New Artist: Djalma Oliveira
Best Arranger: Paulo Pugliesi; Zeza Amaral	Best Song: "Sempre Você" – Dominguinhos; Dominguinhos, songwriter
Best Album: De fiá pavi – Luiz Gonzaga

=== Samba ===
Best Male Singer: Roberto Ribeiro	Best Female Singer: Alcione
Best Group: Fundo de Quintal	Best Male New Artist: Dunga
Best Female New Artist: Ircéa	Best Arranger: Ivan Paulo
Best Song: "Nas Rimas do Amor" – Beth Carvalho; Sombrinha and Adilson Victor, songwriters	Best Album: Sem Meu Tamborim Não Vou – Marçal

=== Special ===
Song of the Year: "Passarim" – Tom Jobim; Tom Jobim, songwriter	Best Visual Project: Coração Malandro – Martinho da Vila; Elifas Andreato, art director
Contribution to Brazilian Music: Roberto Carlos
