= 15 Éxitos =

15 Éxitos, or 15 Exitos, may refer to:

- 15 Éxitos (Alejandra Guzmán album), 2002
- 15 éxitos (Flor Silvestre album), 1984
- 15 éxitos, vol. 2 (Flor Silvestre album)
- 15 Éxitos Vol. 1 (Los Caminantes album), 1983
- 15 Éxitos Vol. 2, a 1985 album by Los Caminantes
- 15 Éxitos Vol. 3, a 1987 album by Los Caminantes
- 15 Éxitos de Juan Gabriel, 2004
- 15 Éxitos: Corridos Famosos, 1991
