= OTI Festival 1972 =

1st OTI Song Festival

Date and venue
- Final: 25 November 1972
- Venue: Palacio de Exposiciones y Congresos auditorium Madrid, Spain

Organization
- Organizer: Organización de Televisión Iberoamericana (OTI)
- Supervisor: Amaury Daumas
- Host broadcaster: Televisión Española (TVE)
- Musical director: Augusto Algueró
- Presenters: Rosa María Mateo; Raúl Matas

Participants
- Number of entries: 13
- Debuting countries: All
- Participation map: Participating countries

Vote
- Voting system: Each country had 5 jurors and each of them voted for their favorite entry.
- Winning song: Brazil "Diálogo"

The OTI Festival 1972 (Spanish: Primer Gran Premio de la Canción Iberoamericana, Portuguese: Primeiro Grande Prêmio da Canção Ibero-Americana) was the first edition of the OTI Festival, held on 25 November 1972 at the auditorium of the Palacio de Exposiciones y Congresos in Madrid, Spain, and presented by Rosa María Mateo and Raúl Matas. It was organised by the Organización de Televisión Iberoamericana (OTI) and host broadcaster Televisión Española (TVE).

Broadcasters from fourteen countries were expected to debut in the festival, but the entry from Mexico was disqualified because its lyrics didn't comply with the rules, and the Mexican broadcaster refused to send a replacement. Of the remaining thirteen entries who took the stage, the winner was the song "Diálogo", written by Paulo César Pinheiro and Baden Powell, and performed by Claudia Regina and Tobías representing Brazil; with "Oh, Señor", written by Basilio Fergus, Pablo Herrero, and José Luis Armenteros, and performed by Basilio himself representing Panama, placing second; and "Niña", written by Manuel Alejandro, and performed by Marisol representing Spain, placing third.

The broadcast of the festival marked the first time in history that so many countries linked together via satellite to participate in a song contest.

== Background ==
The Organización de Televisión Iberoamericana (OTI) was formed in 1971 as a tool of exchange of news and audiovisual contents of any kind between the active member broadcasters. As a part of those goals, the organisation agreed to create a competitive song festival, the Gran Premio de la Canción Iberoamericana/Grande Prêmio da Canção Ibero-Americana, following the example of the Eurovision Song Contest, in order to encourage the creation of original songs among Spanish and Portuguese-speaking authors, composers, and performers.

== Location ==
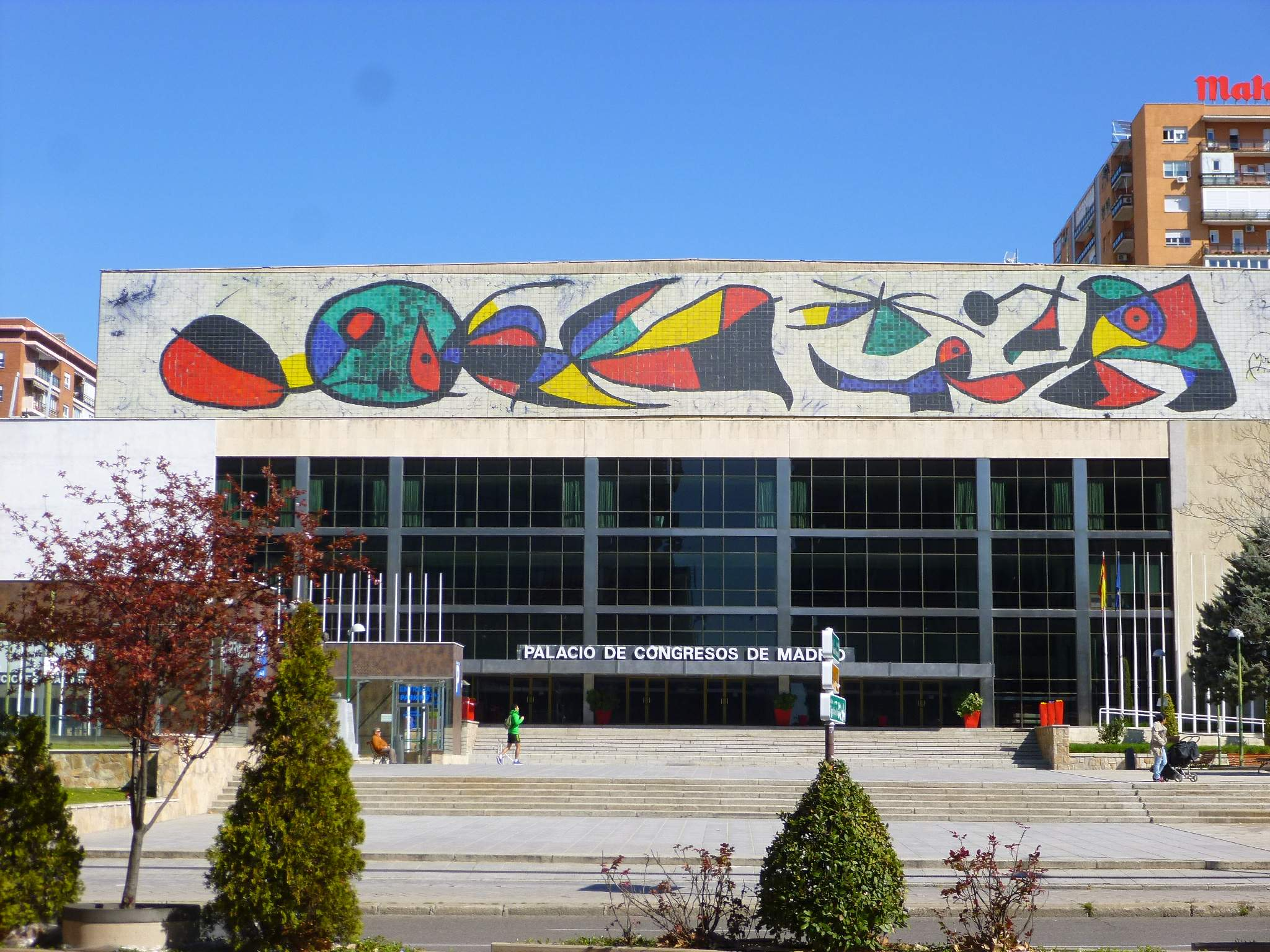
Exhibition and Convention Palace, Madrid – host venue of the OTI Festival 1972.

The members of the organisation agreed that Televisión Española (TVE) would hold the first edition of the OTI Festival in Madrid. The venue selected was the auditorium of the Palacio de Exposiciones y Congresos, with a seat capacity for over 1,500 people. This exhibition and convention hall, which was, at that time, the biggest convention-oriented building of Spain, is located in the Castellana neighborhood, in the central part of the city. The building was designed by Pablo Pintado y Riba. Construction was finished in 1970 and the large tile mural on its façade by ceramist Josep Llorens i Artigas following a design by Joan Miró was added later in 1980.

== Participants ==
The OTI members, public or private broadcasters from Spain, Portugal, and twelve Spanish and Portuguese speaking countries of Ibero-America initially signed up for the contest. Telesistema Mexicano (TSM) had initially registered for the contest, and had selected through its 1st National OTI Festival the song "Yo no voy a la guerra", written by Roberto Cantoral, and performed by Alberto Ángel "El Cuervo", as its entry; but this was disqualified by the OTI Program Commission because its lyrics didn't comply with the rules of the competition for going against "the idiosyncratic sensitivity or way of life of the Ibero-American peoples". (Note: TVE had previously declined the right granted to it by the rules to accept or reject songs, so the decision to reject the Mexican song was made solely by the OTI Program Commission.) The commission asked TSM to submit a replacement song, but the broadcaster refused to do so. Mexico had been drawn to perform between Colombia and Peru. This left the final total number of participants at thirteen.

◇ Disqualified entry

Participants of the OTI Festival 1972
Country	Broadcaster(s)	Song	Artist	Songwriter(s)	Language	Conductor
Argentina	Canal 7 Argentina	"Sabes que estamos aquí América"	Víctor Heredia	Víctor Heredia	Spanish	Augusto Algueró
Bolivia	TVB	"No volveré a pasar por allí"	Arturo Quesada	Manuel de la Calva; Ramón Arcusa	Spanish	Eddy Guerín
Brazil	Rede Tupi	"Diálogo"	Claudia Regina & Tobías	Paulo César Pinheiro; Baden Powell	Portuguese	Carlos Monteiro De Souza
Chile	TVN	"Una vez, otra vez"	Guillermo Basterrechea	Eduardo Tarifa; Guillermo Basterrechea	Spanish	Eddy Guerín
Colombia	Caracol Televisión; PUNCH; RTI	"Volverás a mis brazos"	Christopher	Eduardo Cabas de la Espriella; Armando Velázquez	Spanish	Armando Velázquez
Dominican Republic		"Siempre habrá en la luna una sonrisa"	Fernando Casado	Meche Díez	Spanish	Augusto Algueró
Mexico	TSM ◇	"Yo no voy a la guerra" ◇	Alberto Ángel "El Cuervo" ◇	Roberto Cantoral ◇	Spanish ◇	—N/a
Panama	RPC-TV	"Oh, Señor"	Basilio	Basilio Fergus; Pablo Herrero; José Luis Armenteros	Spanish	Augusto Algueró
Peru	Panamericana Televisión	"Recuerdos de un adiós"	Betty Missiego	Betty Missiego	Spanish	Román Alís
Portugal	RTP	"Glória Glória Aleluia"	Tonicha	José Cid Tavares	Portuguese	Augusto Algueró
Puerto Rico	WKAQ-Telemundo	"Por ti"	Chucho Avellanet	Guillermo Venegas Lloveras	Spanish	Pedro Rivera Toledo
Spain	TVE	"Niña"	Marisol	Manuel Alejandro	Spanish	Augusto Algueró
Uruguay	Sociedad Televisora Larrañaga	"Busco mi destino"	Rona	Jorge da Trindade	Spanish	Augusto Algueró
Venezuela	RCTV	"Sueños de cristal y miel"	Mirla Castellanos	Pablo Schneider	Spanish	Eduardo Cabrera

== Festival overview ==
The festival was held on Saturday 25 November 1972, beginning at 24:00 CET (23:00 UTC). (Note: Which was actually Sunday 26 November in peninsular Spain.) It was presented by Rosa María Mateo and Raúl Matas. The musical director was Augusto Algueró who conducted the RTVE Light Music Orchestra when required. The draw to determine the running order (R/O) was held on 30 October, at the TVE boardroom in Prado del Rey. Participants began rehearsing at the venue on 21 November.

The show began with the "OTI Theme" composed by Ernesto Halffter. In between the songs in competition, traditional dance groups of the Sección Femenina from Ibiza, Redondela, and Seville performed. The interval act consisted of an orchestral medley of Algueró songs "Penélope" and "Te quiero, te quiero".

The winner was the song "Diálogo", written by Paulo César Pinheiro and Baden Powell, and performed by Claudia Regina and Tobías representing Brazil; with "Oh, Señor", written by Basilio Fergus, Pablo Herrero, and José Luis Armenteros, and performed by Basilio himself representing Panama, placing second; and "Niña", written by Manuel Alejandro, and performed by Marisol representing Spain, placing third. The performers of the winning entry received a single trophy while its composer and lyricist each received a plaque. The performers of the entries who placed second and third each received a trophy. The prizes were delivered by Eduardo Reina, president of the OTI programs committee; and Luis Ángel de la Viuda, director of TVE. The festival ended with a reprise of the winning entry.

Winner

Results of the OTI Festival 1972
R/O	Country	Song	Artist	Votes	Place
1	Bolivia	"No volveré a pasar por allí"	Arturo Quesada	3	9
2	Chile	"Una vez, otra vez"	Guillermo Basterrechea	4	7
3	Puerto Rico	"Por ti"	Chucho Avellanet	6	4
4	Spain	"Niña"	Marisol	7	3
5	Colombia	"Volverás a mis brazos"	Christopher	3	9
6	Peru	"Recuerdos de un adiós"	Betty Missiego	3	9
7	Uruguay	"Busco mi destino"	Rona	3	9
8	Argentina	"Sabes que aquí estamos, América"	Víctor Heredia	3	9
9	Portugal	"Glória, glória, aleluia"	Tonicha	5	6
10	Venezuela	"Sueños de cristal y miel"	Mirla Castellanos	6	4
11	Brazil	"Diálogo"	Claudia Regina & Tobías	10	1
12	Panama	"Oh, Señor"	Basilio	8	2
13	Dominican Republic	"Siempre habrá en la luna una sonrisa"	Fernando Casado	4	7

=== Spokespersons ===
Each participating broadcaster appointed a spokesperson who was responsible for announcing the votes for their respective jury in the order of participation via telephone. Known spokespersons at the 1972 festival are listed below.

- Bolivia – María Eugenia Ruiz (Note: The stand-in delegates of Bolivia and the Dominican Republic announced their votes themselves on stage.)
- Chile – César Antonio Santis
- Spain – José Luis Uribarri
- Uruguay – Antonio Carrizo (Note: Uruguay and Argentina shared the spokesperson since the juries of both countries were located in the same facilities in Buenos Aires.)
- Argentina – Antonio Carrizo
- Panama – Eduardo Frangias
- Dominican Republic – Adriano Rodríguez

== Detailed voting results ==
Each participating broadcaster assembled a national jury located in its respective country, composed of five members each. Each juror gave one vote to its favorite entry and could not vote for the entry representing its own country. Each participating broadcaster had also a delegate present in the hall to stand in for its jury if it was not receiving the event live, or in case of communication failure during the broadcast or voting. In the event of a tie for first place, the stand-in delegates from the countries not affected by the tie would vote to select the winning song from among the tied ones. In the event of a tie for second or third place, no tiebreaker would be held. All the countries gave their votes remotely by telephone, except for Bolivia and the Dominican Republic, who used the stand-in delegates since they were not receiving the event live. The voting was supervised by OTI representative Amaury Daumas.

=== Voting process ===
Winner

Detailed voting results of the OTI Festival 1972
Voter: National jury Stand-in delegate		Voting countries													Classification	
Voter: National jury Stand-in delegate		Bolivia	Chile	Puerto Rico	Spain	Colombia	Peru	Uruguay	Argentina	Portugal	Venezuela	Brazil	Panama	Dominican Republic	Votes	Place
Contestants	Bolivia					1	1							1	3	9
Contestants	Chile									2		1	1		4	7
Contestants	Puerto Rico				1	2	1							2	6	4
Contestants	Spain		1	1		1		1	1	1			1		7	3
Contestants	Colombia	1		1	1										3	9
Contestants	Peru	1								1		1			3	9
Contestants	Uruguay		1		1								1		3	9
Contestants	Argentina				1		1	1							3	9
Contestants	Portugal			1			1					2	1		5	6
Contestants	Venezuela			1		1		1				1		2	6	4
Contestants	Brazil		1		1		1	1		1	5				10	1
Contestants	Panama	1	2					1	4						8	2
Contestants	Dominican Republic	2		1									1		4	7

== Broadcast ==
The festival was broadcast in the 13 participating countries and in Costa Rica, Ecuador, El Salvador, Guatemala, Honduras, Mexico, Nicaragua, and the United States, where the corresponding OTI member broadcasters relayed the contest through their networks. This marked the first time in history that so many countries linked together via satellite to participate in a song contest. Using the ground station located in Buitrago del Lozoya, the television signal was sent from Madrid to the Americas via the Intelsat IV F-2 satellite, where eight ground stations were responsible for distributing it to the broadcasters within their reach. (Note: The Balcarce ground station in Argentina was used, and the other ground stations were located in Brazil, Colombia, Chile, Panama, Peru, Puerto Rico, and Venezuela.) Of the participating countries, only Bolivia and the Dominican Republic did not receive the event live, as they neither had a satellite ground station nor were within reach of one.

Since most broadcasters in the Americas used the 525 lines television system, TVE produced the festival in color natively in that system to avoid intermediate conversions. The signal was subsequently converted to the 625 lines system by the receiving broadcasters in Argentina, Portugal, Spain, and Uruguay.

Although Spain and the American countries are separated by a wide time difference, the show was an enormous success and was watched by over one hundred million people. Mexico was the country where the viewing figures were the highest, although the country did not participate in the competition.

Known details on the broadcasts in each country, including the specific broadcasting stations and commentators are shown in the tables below.

Broadcasters and commentators in participating countries
Country	Broadcaster	Channel(s)	Commentator(s)	Ref.
Argentina	Canal 7 Argentina			
Chile	TVN	Canal 7		
Colombia	Inravisión (Note: Through the programadoras: Caracol Televisión, Producciones Nacionales Colombianas de Hoy (PUNCH), and Radio Televisión Interamericana (RTI).)	Canal Nacional (Note: Delayed broadcast on 26 November at 22:05 COT (03:05+1 UTC))		
Puerto Rico	WKAQ-Telemundo	Canal 2		
Spain	TVE	TVE 1	No commentary	
Spain	Radio Popular (Note: Simulcast on Radio Popular de Mallorca.)			
Spain	Cadena SER (Note: Simulcast on Radio Castellón, Radio Rioja, and Radio Valladolid.)			
