= Rafael Pineda =

Rafael Pineda may refer to:

- Rafael Pineda (television journalist) (1937–2026), Cuban-American television news reporter and anchor
- Rafael Pineda (boxer) (born 1966), Colombian boxer
