= Brazil in the OTI Festival =

- OTI Festival
- Participating broadcaster: Rede Tupi; Rede Globo; Sistema Brasileiro de Televisão (SBT); Rede Record

Participation summary
- Appearances: 17
- First appearance: 1972
- Last appearance: 1995
- Highest placement: 1st: 1972, 1978, 1983
- Host: 1973
- Participation history: 1972; 1973; 1974; 1975; 1976; 1977; 1978; 1979; 1980; 1981; 1982; 1983; 1984; 1985; 1986; 1987; 1988 – 1992; 1993; 1994; 1995; 1996 – 2000

The participation of Brazil in the OTI Festival began at the first OTI Festival in 1972. The Brazilian participating broadcasters were Rede Tupi, Rede Globo, Sistema Brasileiro de Televisão (SBT), and Rede Record, which were members of the Organização da Televisão Ibero-americana (OTI). They participated in the event intermittently for seventeen editions until 1995. They won the festival three times: in 1972, 1978, and 1983; and Rede Tupi hosted the event once, in 1973.

== History ==
Brazil withdrew from the event in 1985 and 1986 and returned in 1987. It withdrew again from 1988 to 1992. One year later, it made a brief return to the event until 1995. From 1996 on, Brazil retired definitively from the event.

The Brazilian OTI contestants were internally selected. Brazil was one of the most successful participating countries in the festival with three victories: The first of those victories came in 1972 in the first edition of the festival with the song "Diálogo" sung by Cláudia Regina and Tobias. The second Brazilian victory came in 1978 in Santiago de Chile with the song "El amor... cosa tan rara", which was performed in Spanish by Denisse de Kalafe. The third and last victory of Brazil took place in Washington D.C. in 1983 with the song "Estrela de papel" sung by Jessé. In total, Brazil managed to reach ten times the top 10.

Brazil hosted the OTI Festival in 1973, after winning the song contest the previous year, according to the original rules. The festival was held in the Palácio das Artes in Belo Horizonte. The stage of the festival had soft colors, a background zone for the orchestra and a central platform where the performers competed and the event was presented by Walter Forster and Íris Lettieri. The event was hosted by Rede Tupi's affiliate TV Itacolomi.

== Participation overview ==
Table key
1	First place
2	Second place

Year	Song	Artist	Songwriter(s)	Conductor	Place	Points
1972	"Diálogo"	Claudia Regina & Tobías	Paulo César Pinheiro; Baden Powell	Carlos Monteiro De Souza	1	10
1973	"Baianeiro"	Nadinho da Ilha	Armando Aguilar	Ivan Paulo	4	7
1974	"Porque?"	Agnaldo Rayol	Sílvio César	Poncho Pérez	18	0
1975	"Desejo"	Raphael	Raphael	Waltel Branco	8	4
1976	"María de las flores"	Denisse de Kalafe	Denisse de Kalafe		4	9
1977	"Pedindo amor"	Lolita Rodrigues	Enéas Machado de Assis	Élcio Álvarez	17	0
1978	"El amor... cosa tan rara"	Denisse de Kalafe	Denisse de Kalafe	Chucho Ferrer	1	51
1979	"Conselhos"	Miltinho	Hamilton Pereira; Decio Richardi	Eduardo Cabrera	5	21
1980	"Convite ao vento"	Márcia	Dino Galvão Bueno	José Briamonte	4	29
1981	"Renascença"	Cláudya	Edmundo Villani-Côrtes		10	14
1982	"Un canto a los niños"	Júlio Cézar	Júlio Cézar; Nelson Ned	Luis Neves	10	15
1983	"Estrela de papel"	Jessé	Jessé; Elifas Andreato	Daniel Alberto Salinas	1	—N/a
1984	"Barcas perdidas"	Moacyr Franco	Moacyr Franco	Ted Moreno	—N/a	
Did not participate between 1985 and 1986
1987	"Estrela do norte"	Leila Pinheiro	Eduardo Gudin; Costa Neto	Fernando Correia Martins	—N/a	
Did not participate between 1988 and 1992
1993	"Essa fase do amor"	Emílio Santiago	Altay Veloso; Samuel Santana	Luiz Avellar	2	—N/a
1994	"Mulher"	Zé Renato	C. Mesquita; S. Cabral		11	0
1995	"Aonde está você"	Beto Surian	Beto Surian	Oscar Cardozo Ocampo	—N/a	
Did not participate between 1996 and 2000

== Hosting ==
Year	City	Venue	Hosts	Ref.
1973	Belo Horizonte	Palácio das Artes	Walter Forster; Íris Lettieri	
