= El Joni =

American singer-songwriter

Joni Sandez
- Born: Jonathan Sandez; May 6, 1992 (age 33); Ventura, California
- Genres: Regional Mexican, Ranchera, Grupero, Cumbia
- Occupation: Singer-songwriter
- Instruments: Vocals, guitar, bass
- Website: www.jonisandez.com

Jonathan Sandez (born May 6, 1992), professionally known by his stage name Joni Sandez, is a singer-songwriter, guitarist and performer. Born and raised in Southern California, Joni began his music career in his pre-teens playing guitar and performing with local garage bands in San Bernardino, California. Although his early influences were heavy metal and rock his music now is a variety of Ranchera, Grupero and Cumbia music.

== Life and career ==
Sandez was born in Ventura, California, United States, to a Mexican mother and father. He is the youngest of four children. At 15 years of age he became temporary bassist of a Regional Mexican band "Los Caminantes". After graduating from Pacific High School in San Bernardino, California, he became permanent bassist of the band and toured the United States and South America for two years. El Joni was also a member of the band "Grupo El Tiempo".

== See also ==
- Los Caminantes
