= Tonicha =

Portuguese pop-folk singer (born 1946)

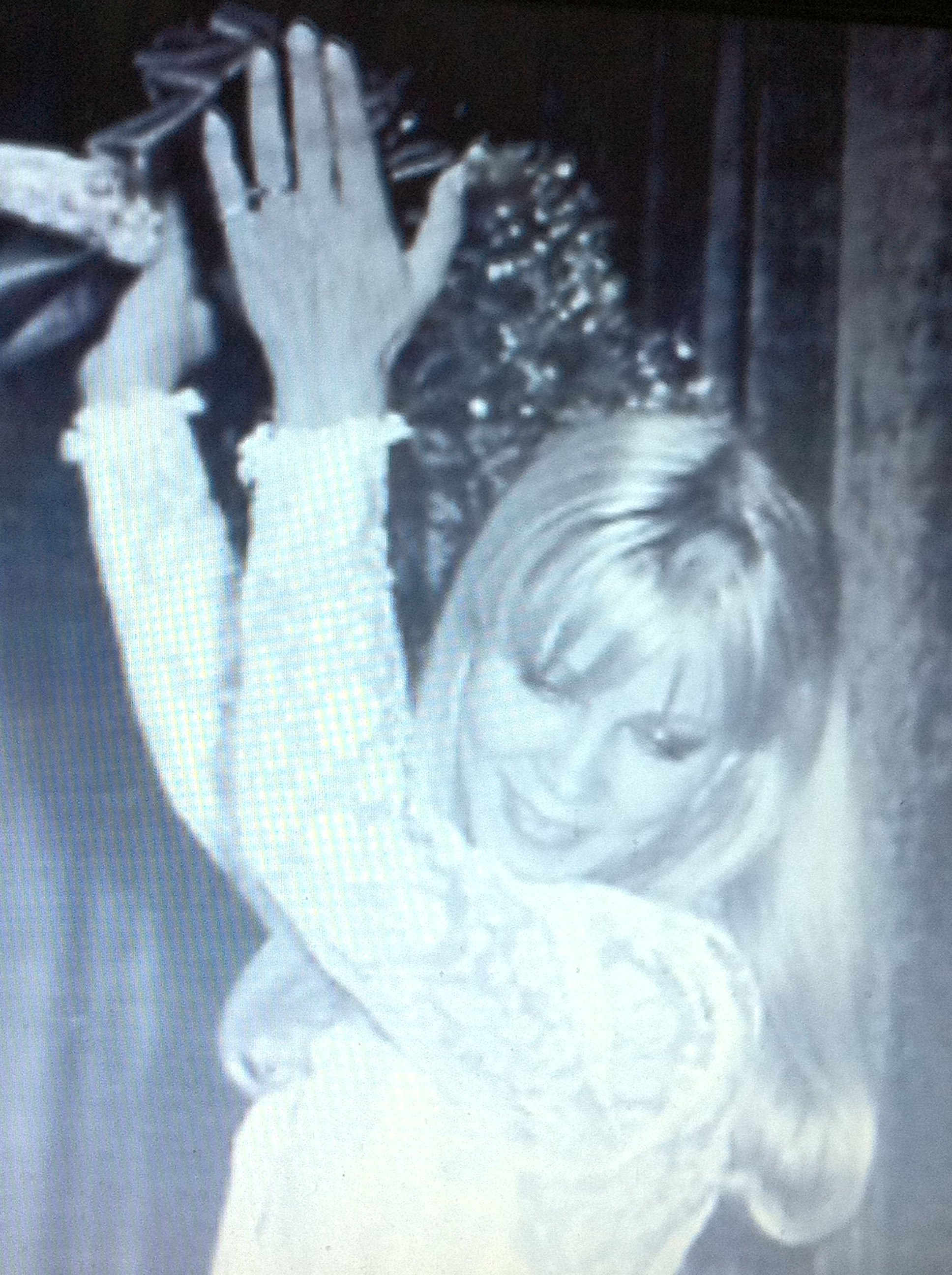

Background information
- Born: Antónia de Jesus Montes Tonicha; 8 March 1946 (age 80); Beja, Portugal
- Genres: Pop
- Occupation: Singer
- Instrument: Vocals
- Years active: 1963–present
- Label: Universal

Antónia de Jesus Montes Tonicha (born on 8 March 1946), better known as Tonicha, is a Portuguese pop-folk singer. She represented Portugal in the Eurovision Song Contest 1971, with the song "Menina do alto da serra" ("Girl from the country mountain"); she finished ninth in a field of 18, with 83 points. She also represented her country in the OTI Festival 1972 in which she had better luck and finished sixth.

== Discography ==
- Vários-Fala do Homem Nascido (Orfeu, 1972)
- (LP, 1972)
- Folclore (LP, Orfeu, 1973) SB-1066
- As Duas Faces de Tonicha (LP, Zip-Zip, 1974)
- Canções de Abril (conjunto e coros) (LP, Discófilo, 1975)
- Conjunto e Coros (Lp, Orfeu, 1975)
- Cantigas do meu País (LP, Orfeu, 1975)
- As Duas Faces de Tonicha (LP, Orfeu, 1975)
- Cantigas Populares (LP, Orfeu, 1976) SB-1088
- Cantigas Duma Terra À Beira Mar (LP, Polygram, 1977)
- Ela Por Ela (LP, Polygram, 1980) – reeditado em 1996
- Foliada Portuguesa (LP, Polygram, 1983)
- Regresso (CD, Polygram, 1993)
- Canções d' Aquém e D'Além Tejo (CD, Polygram, 1995)
- Mulher (CD, Polygram, 1997)
- Canções Para Os Meus Netos (CD, Universal, 2008)
- Cantos da Vida – Colecção Vida (CD, Farol, 2008)
- Os Maiores Sucessos- vol. I (RCA, 1970)
- Os Maiores Sucessos de Tonicha – Vol.II (RCA, 1970)
- Os Maiores Sucessos (LP, Polygram, 1981)
- A Arte e a Música de Tonicha (2LP, Polygram, 1985)
- Sucessos Populares (LP, Polygram, 1987)
- A Arte e a Música de Tonicha (2LP, Polygram, 1989)
- Os Maiores Sucessos (CD, Polygram, 1990)
- O Melhor dos Melhores (CD, Movieplay, 1994)
- Coração Português (CD, Polygram, 1999)
- O Melhor de 2 Tonicha/Trio Odemira (2CD, Universal, 2001)
- Antologia 1971–1977 (2CD, Movieplay, 2004)
- A Arte e a Música (CD, Universal, 2004)
- Antologia 77–97 (CD, Universal, 2007)

=== Singles and EPs ===
RCA/TELECTRA [1964/1970]

- Luar Para Esta Noite (RCA, 1964)[-LUAR PARA ESTA NOITE/SÓ EU/CANÇÃO DE SER TRISTE/ENFIM]
- Boca de Amora (RCA, 1966) TP-290
- O Que Foste E Já Não És (EP, Rca, 1966)
- A Tua Canção Avózinha (EP, RCA, 1967)
- Tonicha volta a cantar Damas/Paião (RCA, 1967)
- Calendário (RCA, 1968) TP-372
- Fui ter Com a Madrugada (RCA, 1968) TP-373
- Canta José cid (1968) [La Mansarde/Emporte-Moi/Loin d'Ici]
- Caminheiro, Donde Vens? – 1969 [RCA TP-445] Caminheiro, Donde Vens?/Terra Sonhada/Amanhã/Canção Para um Regresso
- Modas do Ribatejo [RCA TP-473, 1969)] [Vira dos Malmequeres/Moda das Carreirinhas/Erva Cidreira/Vira da Rapioca]
- Modas do Alentejo (RCA TP-497)[Rapsódia de cantares alentejanos/Primavera das lindas flores/Maria Rita, cara bonita/Com que letra se escreve Maria]
- Foclore de Portugal [RCA TP-515] [Senhora do Almortão/Pesinho Do Pico/Resineiro/Lirio Branco]
- D. Pedro (EP, RCA, 1969) TP-530 [D.Pedro (Que Volta Da Pinga)/Balada da Rotina Diária/O Meu País/Livre]
- Canta Foclore de Portugal [RCA TP-562] [Vai de Ruz Truz Truz/Coradinhas/La-Ri-Ló-Lé/Trovas Minhotas]

ZIP-ZIP [1971/1972]

- Menina do Alto da Serra/Mulher (Single, Zip-Zip, 1971) – Zip – 30014/S
- Poema Pena (EP, Zip-Zip, 1972) Poema Pena/Rosa de Barro/Manhã Clara- Zip 10034/E

MOVIEPLAY [1972]

- Menina (do Alto da Serra)/Mulher é Força (Single, Movieplay, 1971) SP – 20.021
- 4 Canções de Patxi Andion (EP, Movieplay, 1972)
- Poema desde Lejos/20 Versos A Mi Muerte (Single, Movieplay, 1972)

ORFEU [1972/1973]

- Glória, Glória, Aleluia/Lisboa Perto e Longe (1972) Orfeu Sat 845
- Parole, Parole [com João Perry]/Simplesmente Maria (Orfeu, 1972)
- A Rapariga e o Poeta (EP, Orfeu, 1973) [A Rapariga e o Poeta/Com Um Cravo Na Boca/Contraluz/Rosa, Rosa]- ATEP 6467
- Folclore (EP, 1973) Farrapeirinha/Os Bravos/Malhão De Águeda/Dança Daí – Atep 6500
- Batatinhas (EP, Orfeu, 1973)-Atep 6541-Batatinhas/Senhor Padre Valentim/Vira Do Vinho/Passarinho Trigueiro

ZIP-ZIP [1974]

- Portugal Ressuscitado/Canção Combate (EP, Zip-Zip, 1974) – InClave/Tonicha/Fernando Tordo – Zip 30052/S
- Obrigado Soldadinho/Já chegou a Liberdade (Single, Zip-Zip, 1974) – Zip – 30053/S
- O Preto No Branco/Tanto Me Faz (Single, Zip-Zip, 1974) – Zip – 30056/S
- Canto da Primavera/Os Novos Pobres (Single, Zip-Zip, 1974) – Zip – 30061/S
- Folclore (Single, Zip-zip, 1974)

DISCOFILO [1975]

- O Povo Em Marcha/Cravos da Madrugada (Discófilo, 1975) 1001
- Bandeira da Vitória/Cantaremos-Lutaremos (Single, Discófilo, 1975) 1008
- Terras de Garcia Lorca/Paìs irmão (Single, Discófilo, 1975)
- Folclore (EP, Discófilo)Isto agora Vai Ou Racha
- Folclore (EP, Discófilo) [Ribeira Cheia/Barquinha Feiticeira/Vida Militar/Cantiga do Rei]

ORFEU [1975/1976]

- conjunto e coros-1 (Ep, Orfeu, 1975) Terras de Garcia Lorca/Paìs irmão/O povo em marcha/Cravos da madrugada
- Folclore 1 – Cantigas do Meu País (Single, Orfeu, 1975)-atep6683-Fadinho do Pobre/Barquinha Feiticeira/Cantiga do Rei/Vida Militar
- Folclore 2(EP, 1975)Compadre Partidário/Serrana Povo/Isto Agora Vai Ou Racha/Barqueiros do Povo – Atep 6684–6685
- Folclore 3 – Cantigas do Meu País (EP, Orfeu, 1975) A Moda da Saia Curta
- Cantaremos/Lutaremos (conjunto e coros-2) (Ep, Orfeu, 1975)Cantaremos-Lutaremos/Somos Livres/Bandeira da Vitória/Hino do Trabalho – Atep 6696
- Cantigas Populares 1 (Orfeu, 1975) – Atep 6698 – Minha Mãe, Minha Mãe/Entrudo/Milho Verde
- Cantigas Populares 2 (Orfeu, 1975) – Atep 6699 – O Meu Bem/Charamba/Roseira Brava/Samacaio
- Cantigas Populares 3 (Orfeu, 1975) – Atep 6700 – Olhos pretos/Menina Florentina/Cantigas do Maio
- Farrapeira/S. João/Fado/Poveirinha (EP, Orfeu, 1976)

POLYGRAM [1976–]

- O Menino/Um Grande Amor (Single, Polygram, 1976) – 2063015
- Marcha da Mouraria/Marcha de Benfica (Single, Polygram, 1977) – 2063022
- Tu És o Zé Que Fumas/Cana Verde (Single, Polygram, 1977) – 2063027
- Quem Te Quer Bem, Meu Bem/Um Dia Uma Flor (Single, Polygram, 1978) – 2063032
- Pestotira/Vira da Desgarrada (Single, Polygram, 1978) – 2063033
- Canção da Amizade/É Tarde Meu Amor (Single, Polygram, 1978) – 2063036
- Zumba Na Caneca (Single, Polygram, 1978) – 2063039
- O Gaiteiro Português/Sericotalho, Bacalhau. Azeite e Alho (Single, Polygram, 1979)- 2063045
- O Chico Pinguinhas/Quadrilha de Cinfães (Single, Polygram, 1979) – 2063050
- Canção da Alegria/Canção Sem Ti (Single, Polygram, 1981) – 6063061 –
- Fadinho da Comida (Single, Polygram, 1981)
- Pulguinhas (Single, Polygram, 1982)
- Todos Me Querem/O Mar Enrola NA Areia (Single, Polygram, 1983) 8134197
- Pinga Amor/Canção do Futebol (Single, Polygram, 1984) – 881049
- Esta Festa Portuguesa (Single, Polygram, 1985)
- Fátima Altar do Mundo (A 13 de Maio/Avé Maria de Shubert) (Single, Polygram, 1987)

Awards and achievements
| Preceded by Simone de Oliveira with "Desfolhada portuguesa" | Portugal in the Eurovision Song Contest; 1971 | Succeeded by Carlos Mendes with "A festa da vida" |
| Preceded by - | Portugal in the OTI Festival; 1972 | Succeeded by Paco Bandeira with "Poema de mim" |
