= José Luis Armenteros =

José Luis Armenteros Sánchez (Madrid, 26 June 1943 – Ibidem, 11 June 2016) was a Spanish musician and composer.

== Career ==
He was a member of the instrumental group Los Relámpagos (1965). In 1968, together with Pablo Herrero, they decided to give their career a new direction by producing and composing for other artists, becoming the most important and prolific composing and producing team of the second half of the 20th century in Spain, with songs performed by Fórmula V, Nino Bravo, Francisco, Juan Bau, Basilio, José Luis Rodríguez "El Puma", Jarcha or Rocío Jurado, among others. As producers they have supported groups such as Doctor Pop, and singers such as Juan Bau.

From 2010 until his death he played in the vintage instrumental group Trastos viejos. The band was made up of veteran musicians from the 60s and 70s; on keyboards, Pablo Herrero, founder of Los Relámpagos; Fernando Mariscal on drums (Los Zipi y Zape, Los Polaris and Los Relámpagos); on bass, Eduardo Talavera (Los Saturnos and Los Relámpagos); Luis Álvarez on guitar (Los Tiburones, Los Kurois, Los Dayson, Vicky y Los Polaris and some appearances with Los Relámpagos) and on vocals, the voice of the group, Eduardo Buddy García Velasco (Los Charcos and Los Camperos).

== Discography as a composer with Pablo Herrero ==
- "Un beso y una flor" (Nino Bravo).
- "Libre" (Nino Bravo).
- "America, America" (Nino Bravo).
- "The Star of David"(John Bau).
- "I have your love"(Formula V).
- "Cuéntame" (Formula V).
- "Cinderella" (Formula V).
- "Eva Maria" (Formula V).
- "La fiesta de Blas" (Formula V).
- "Freedom without anger"(Jarcha).
- "Like a wave" (Rocío Jurado).
- "Latino"(Francisco).
- "Distant lands"(Basilio).
- "Venezuela" (Balbino).
- "Atrévete" (José Luis Rodríguez "El Puma").
- "Canoero" (Marco Antonio Muñiz).
- "Los Abedules"(Marco Antonio Muñiz).
- "La noche que te amé"(Marco Antonio Muñiz).
- "Guitarra de media noche" (Marco Antonio Muñiz).
- "Don't close that door" (Marco Antonio Muñiz).
- "Hoy he vuelto a vivir" (Marco Antonio Muñiz).
- "Amame" (Marco Antonio Muñiz).
- "If you believe in love" (Marco Antonio Muñiz).
