= Raúl Matas =

Chilean journalist and radio and television presenter (1921–2004)

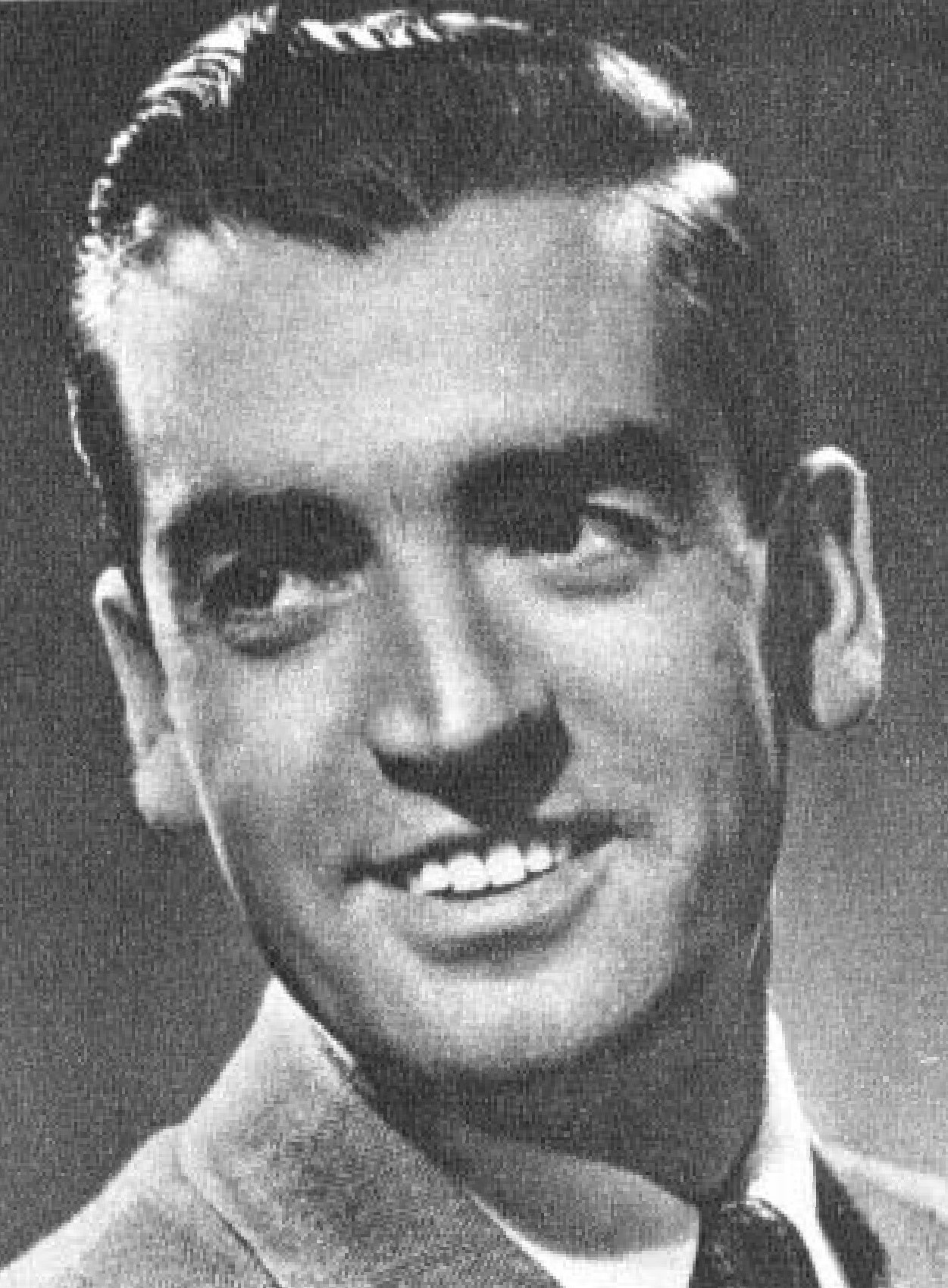
- Matas in 1952
- Born: Raúl Matas Esteban; 13 August 1921; Lanco, Chile
- Died: 31 December 2004 (aged 83); Santiago, Chile

Raúl Matas Esteban (Lanco, 13 August 1921–Santiago, 31 December 2004), nicknamed "El Maestro", was a Chilean journalist, and radio and television broadcaster. His 64-year career took place in Chile, Argentina, Spain, and the United States. He was one of the pioneering television broadcasters in Chile.

== Life and career ==
At the age of 10, he debuted as radio broadcaster in Valdivia. He began studying law, but did not finish his degree; and ended up completing a degree in journalism through correspondence courses. In 1940, he began his professional career in Radio Cooperativa Vitalicia in Santiago. Success came in 1946, when he created and led on Radio Minería the program Discomanía, that launched him to fame and which was also aired on radio stations in Argentina, Mexico, Peru, Spain, the United States, and Uruguay.

In 1958, he moved to Spain where he continued to present segments his program Discomanía from Radio Madrid, after having done the same from Mexico in 1955, and from the United States between 1955 and 1958, where he also worked as a Spanish-language announcer on WRUL. In Spain, he hosted on Televisión Española (TVE) shows such as Cancionero (1962–1964), Media hora con (1966), Al compás de las estrellas (1971), and Buenas tardes (1971–1973). He also participated in films such as Cuando tú no estás (1966) directed by Mario Camus and Las Ibéricas F.C. (1971) directed by Pedro Masó.

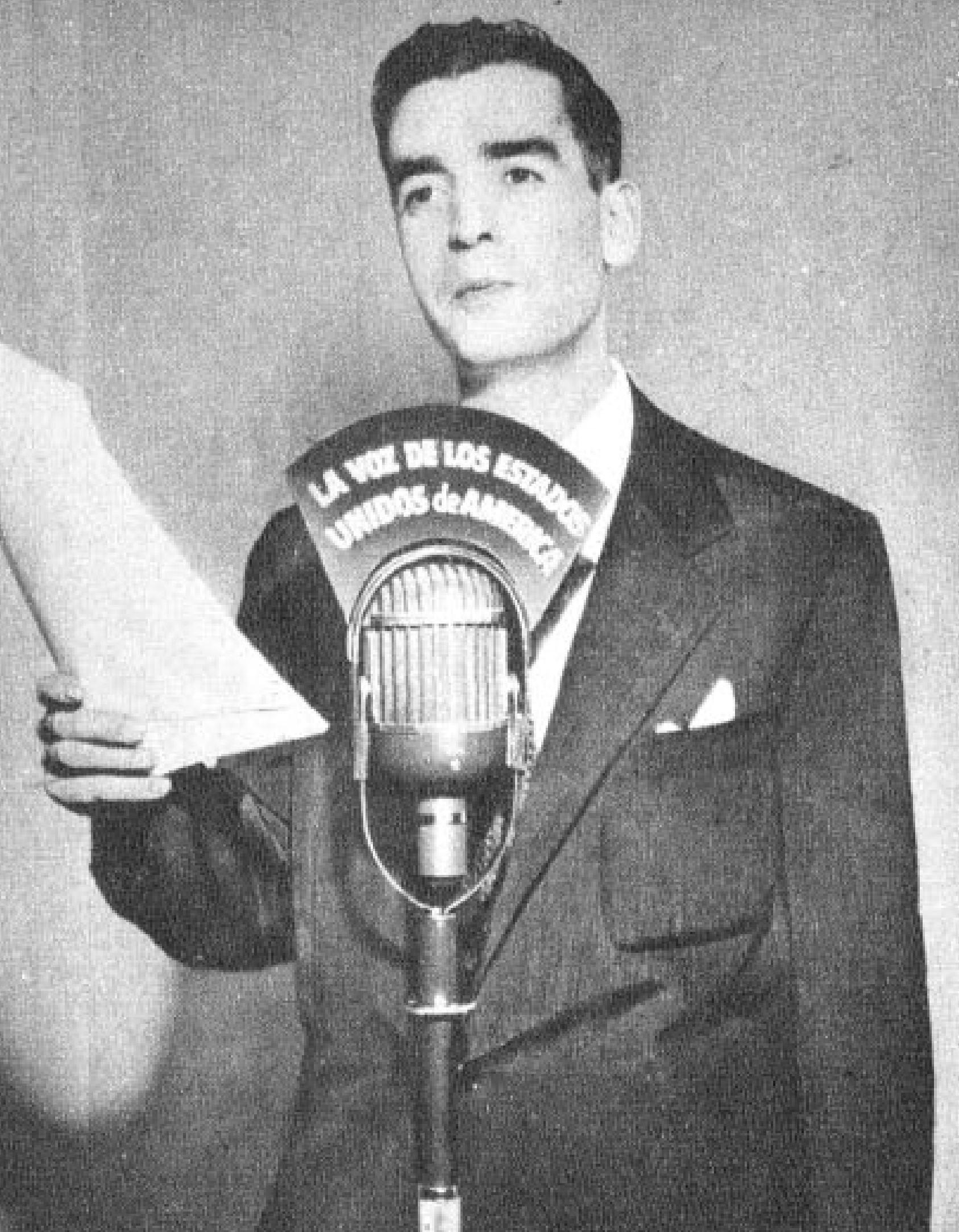
Matas at Voice of America in 1952

In August 1969, he returned to Chile to be one of the founders of Televisión Nacional de Chile (TVN), being appointed artistic director, appearing in its first official broadcast on 18 September, and hosting shows as Post Data and Este domingo. Together with Rosa María Mateo, he presented the first edition of the OTI Festival, staged in Madrid in 1972, which was broadcast live throughout Ibero-America; and together Raquel Argandoña, he also presented the seventh edition staged in Santiago in 1978.

Since 2 January 1977, during the Chilean military dictatorship, he anchored the main newscast on TVN, 60 minutos. In Chile, he also presented Vamos a ver (1977–1983) on TVN; and Una vez más (1988–1996), Almorzando en el Trece (1988–1999), and Café de noche (1997) on Canal 13.

He received two Premios Ondas, in 1965 as best radio broadcaster for Discomanía, and in 1999 recognizing him as one of the ten most important Spanish-speaking radio voices.
