= De Guanajuato...Para America! =

Studio album by Los Caminantes
- Released: 1986
- Genre: Regional Mexican
- Length: 31:16
- Label: Luna

Los Caminantes chronology
Cada Dia Mejor (1985)	De Guanajuato...Para America! (1986)	Gracias Martin (1987)

De Guanajuato...Para America! is the seventh studio album by Mexican group Los Caminantes, released in 1986. The album reached number-one on the Billboard Regional Mexican Albums chart.

== Track listing ==
No.	Title	Writer(s)	Length
1.	"Amor Sin Palabras"	Federico y Francisco Curiel	3:16
2.	"Porque"	Brígido Ramírez	3:19
3.	"Cuando Te Vuelva A Encontrar"	Horacio Ramírez	2:55
4.	"Tu Mirada"	José Ángel Medina	3:29
5.	"Angela"	Martín Ramírez	2:51
6.	"Una Noche"	Agustín Ramírez	2:59
7.	"Fue Ayer"	Eduardo Espinoza	3:13
8.	"Con Mis Propias Manos"	Antonio Herrera Valdez	2:46
9.	"Soldado Raso"	Felipe Valdez Leal	3:32
10.	"El Negro No Puede"	Lalo Frasen	2:56

== Chart performance ==
Chart (1986)	Peak position
US Billboard Regional Mexican Albums	1

== See also ==
- List of number-one Billboard Regional Mexican Albums from the 1980s
