= Mexico in the OTI Festival 1983 =

- OTI Festival 1983
- Participating broadcaster: Televisa
- Country: Mexico
- Selection process: National OTI Festival
- Selection date: 25 September 1983

Competing entry
- Song: "Compás de espera"
- Artist: María Medina
- Songwriter: Amparo Rubín

Placement
- Final result: Finalist

Participation chronology
◄1982 •	1983	• 1984►

Mexico was represented at the OTI Festival 1983 with the song "Compás de espera", written by Amparo Rubín, and performed by María Medina. The Mexican participating broadcaster, Televisa, selected its entry through a national televised competition with several phases. The song, that was performed in position 14, was not among the top-five places revealed.

== National stage ==
Televisa held a national competition with four televised qualifying rounds, two semi-finals, and a final to select its entry for the 12th edition of the OTI Festival. This twelfth edition of the National OTI Festival featured 28 songs in the qualifying rounds, twelve in the semi-finals, and six in the final. The top-three entries were awarded at the end. In addition to the general competition, awards were also given for Best Male Performer, Best Female Performer, Best Musical Arrangement, and Breakout Artist among all the competing artists.

The shows were held at Teatro de la Ciudad in Mexico City, were presented by Raúl Velasco, and were broadcast on Canal 2. The musical director was Chucho Ferrrer, who conducted the orchestra when required.

Competing entries on the National OTI Festival – Mexico 1983
Song	Artist	Songwriter(s)	Conductor
"A la vuelta de la esquina"	Álvaro Dávila	Sergio Andrade	Sergio Andrade
"A ti"	Gil Rivera	Gil Rivera	Eduardo Magallanes
"A veces"	José Luis Duval	Jesús Monárrez; Carlos Lara	Antonio Navarrete
"Acúsote"	Gualberto Castro	Roberto Cantoral	Arturo Castro
"Compás de espera"	María Medina	Amparo Rubín	Chucho Ferrer
"Dame"	Valerio	Tornel; Tepichín; Valerio	Luigi Lazareno
"De todas las mujeres"	Julián	Julián	Chucho Ferrer
"El amor es un manjar"	Alondra	Antonio Elias	Luigi Lazareno
"Es mi mujer"	Massías	Massías	Eduardo Magallanes
"Fotografía"	Óscar Athie	Óscar Athie	Julio Jaramillo
"Invierno"	Alfonso Alarcón	Elvia Vazquez	Rodrigo Álvarez
"La peor amante de la historia"	Carminna	Massías	Ricardo Toral
"Llueve y tiembla"	Hernán Visseti	Hernán Visseti	Paco Navarrete
"Lo extraño"	Lorena Patricia	Lorena Patricia	Antonio Navarrete
"Mi éxito"	Mario Pintor	Mario Pintor	Julio Jaramillo
"Mi soledad"	José Roberto	José Roberto	Julio Jaramillo
"Música"	Lucerito	Lucerito	Sergio Andrade
"No me hace falta"	Mariana Maesse	Francisco Curiel	Chucho Ferrer
"Rabia"	Sagrario Baena	José Eduardo Piña	Chucho Ferrer
"Sí"	Laura Flores	Carlos Vargas	Lázaro Muñiz
"Si tú no estás"	Víctor Yturbe	Alfredo Correa	Eduardo Magallanes
"Sonríe, sintonízate con mi alegría"	Aida Pierce	Antonio Elías	Luigi Lazareno
"Tierno"	César Costa	Sergio Andrade	Sergio Andrade
"Un bello canto"	Imelda Miller	Luis Amador de Gama; Alberto Ángel	Rodolfo "Popo" Sánchez
"Una en un millón"	Roberto Jordán	Jesús Monárrez; Carlos Lara	Ricardo Toral
"Vacuna"	Amparo Rubín	Amparo Rubín	Ricardo Toral
"Y nada"	Guillermo	Guillermo	Luigi Lazareno
"Ya ves corazón"	Rafael Amador	Óscar Athie	Julio Jaramillo

=== Qualifying rounds ===
The four qualifying rounds were held on Saturdays 20 and 27 August, and 3 and 10 September 1983. Each round featured seven entries, of which the three highest-scoring advanced to the semi-finals. In each round, each of the ten jurors cast one vote for each of their three favorite entries.

Qualifier

Result of the first qualifying round of the National OTI Festival – Mexico 1983
R/O	Song	Artist	Votes	Result
1	"Dame"	Valerio	3	—N/a
2	"Sonríe, sintonízate con mi alegría"	Aida Pierce	8	Qualified
3	"Invierno"	Alfonso Alarcón	0	—N/a
4	"Vacuna"	Amparo Rubín	0	—N/a
5	"Fotografía"	Óscar Athie	6	Qualified
6	"El amor es un manjar"	Alondra	6	—N/a
7	"Acúsote"	Gualberto Castro	10	Qualified

Result of the second qualifying round of the National OTI Festival – Mexico 1983
R/O	Song	Artist	Votes	Result
1	"Es mi mujer"	Massías	9	Qualified
2	"Lo extraño"	Lorena Patricia	0	—N/a
3	"Y nada"	Guillermo	0	—N/a
4	"Compás de espera"	María Medina	10	Qualified
5	"A ti"	Gil Rivera	4	—N/a
6	"Sí"	Laura Flores	3	—N/a
7	"A la vuelta de la esquina"	Álvaro Dávila	7	Qualified

Result of the third qualifying round of the National OTI Festival – Mexico 1983
R/O	Song	Artist	Votes	Result
1	"Llueve y tiembla"	Hernán Visseti	2	—N/a
2	"La peor amante de la historia"	Carminna	7	Qualified
3	"A veces"	José Luis Duval	2	—N/a
4	"Rabia"	Sagrario Baena	0	—N/a
5	"Mi éxito"	Mario Pintor	11	Qualified
6	"Música"	Lucerito	3	—N/a
7	"Si tú no estás"	Víctor Yturbe	8	Qualified

Result of the forth qualifying round of the National OTI Festival – Mexico 1983
R/O	Song	Artist	Votes	Result
1	"De todas las mujeres"	Julián	3	—N/a
2	"No me hace falta"	Mariana Maesse	1	—N/a
3	"Mi soledad"	José Roberto	7	Qualified
4	"Ya ves corazón"	Rafael Amador	9	Qualified
5	"Una en un millón"	Roberto Jordán	1	—N/a
6	"Un bello canto"	Imelda Miller	2	—N/a
7	"Tierno"	César Costa	10	Qualified

=== Semi-finals ===
The semi-finals were held on Friday 23 and Saturday 24 September 1983. The twelve songs that qualified in the qualifying rounds were distributed between the two semi-finals, and the three most voted songs from each semi-final went on to the final.

Result of the first semi-final of the National OTI Festival – Mexico 1983
R/O	Song	Artist	Votes	Result
1	"Sonríe, sintonízate con mi alegría"	Aida Pierce	1	—N/a
2	"Es mi mujer"	Massías	3	—N/a
3	"A la vuelta de la esquina"	Álvaro Dávila	9 (Note: In the tiebreaker round "A la vuelta de la esquina" received 8 votes and "Fotografía" received 7 votes.)	Qualified
4	"Si tú no estás"	Víctor Yturbe	10	Qualified
5	"Mi éxito"	Mario Pintor	13	Qualified
6	"Fotografía"	Óscar Athie	9	—N/a

Result of the second semi-final of the National OTI Festival – Mexico 1983
R/O	Song	Artist	Votes	Result
1	"Ya ves corazón"	Rafael Amador	5	—N/a
2	"La peor amante de la historia"	Carminna	3	—N/a
3	"Acúsote"	Gualberto Castro	12	Qualified
4	"Tierno"	César Costa	8	Qualified
5	"Mi soledad"	José Roberto	6	—N/a
6	"Compás de espera"	María Medina	11	Qualified

=== Final ===
The six-song final was held on Sunday 25 September 1983. The final was held in two rounds, shorlisting three songs for a superfinal. The winner was "Compás de espera", written by Amparo Rubín, and performed by María Medina.

Result of the final of the National OTI Festival – Mexico 1983
R/O	Song	Artist	Result
1	"Si tú no estás"	Víctor Yturbe	5
2	"Mi éxito"	Mario Pintor	Qualified
3	"A la vuelta de la esquina"	Álvaro Dávila	4
4	"Acúsote"	Gualberto Castro	6
5	"Compás de espera"	María Medina	Qualified
6	"Tierno"	César Costa	Qualified

Winner

Result of the superfinal of the National OTI Festival – Mexico 1983
R/O	Song	Artist	Votes	Result
1	"Mi éxito"	Mario Pintor	1	3
2	"Compás de espera"	María Medina	11	1
3	"Tierno"	César Costa	3	2

=== Merit awards ===
In the final, the jurors voted aloud for the Best Male and Female Performer, Best Musical Arrangement, and Breakout Artist among the shortlisted artist in each category.

Gualberto Castro received the Best Male Performer Award, Carminna the Best Female Performer Award, Sergio Andrade the Best Musical Arrangement Award for "Tierno", and Rafael Amador and Mariana Maesse the Breakout Artist Award jointly.

=== Official album ===
Las 12 triunfadoras del Festival OTI 83 is the official compilation album of the twelfth edition of the Mexican National OTI Festival, released by Gamma in 1983. The vinyl LP features the studio version of the twelve songs qualified for the semi-finals.

== At the OTI Festival ==
On 29 October 1983, the OTI Festival was held at the DAR Constitution Hall in Washington, D.C., United States, hosted by the Spanish International Network (SIN), and broadcast live throughout Ibero-America. María Medina performed "Compás de espera" in position 14, with Chucho Ferrer conducting the event's orchestra. At the end, only the top five places were announced, and the Mexican entry was not one of them.

Televisa broadcast live the festival on Canal 2.

=== Voting ===
Each participating broadcaster, or group of broadcasters that jointly participated representing a country, appointed a juror who secretly scored each entry in a scale of 5–1 points, except for the entry representing its own country. The Mexican juror was Lucía Méndez.
