= Colombia in the OTI Festival 1983 =

- OTI Festival 1983
- Participating broadcasters: Caracol Televisión; Producciones Nacionales Colombianas de Hoy (PUNCH); Radio Televisión Interamericana (RTI)
- Country: Colombia
- Selection process: National OTI Festival
- Selection date: 23 September 1983

Competing entry
- Song: "Tu pueblo y mi pueblo"
- Artist: Jaime Mora
- Songwriters: Víctor Manuel García; Santander Díaz

Placement
- Final result: 3rd

Participation chronology
◄1982 •	1983	• 1984►

Colombia was represented at the OTI Festival 1983 with the song "Tu pueblo y mi pueblo", written by Víctor Manuel García and Santander Díaz, and performed by Jaime Mora. The Colombian participating broadcasters, programadoras Caracol Televisión, Producciones Nacionales Colombianas de Hoy (PUNCH), and Radio Televisión Interamericana (RTI), selected their entry through a national competition. The song, that was performed in position 11, placed third out of 21 competing entries.

== National stage ==
Programadoras Caracol Televisión, Producciones Nacionales Colombianas de Hoy (PUNCH), and Radio Televisión Interamericana (RTI) held a national televised competition to select their entry for the 12th edition of the OTI Festival. The twelve-song final was staged by RTI Televisión and was broadcast live on Inravisión's Segunda Cadena.

Competing entries on the National OTI Festival – Colombia 1983
Song	Artist	Songwriter(s)
"Aires de Cumbia"	Antún Castro	Antún Castro
"Cansado de andar"	Álvaro González	Efraín González
"Caras"	Gloria María Bermúdez	Gloria María Bermúdez
"Enséñame"	Miguel Fernando	Miguel Fernando Sánchez
"Flor de mi vivir"	Myriam González	Alfonso de la Rosa
"Los caminos del olvido"	Liz	Carlos González
"Mi ruego"	Greta	Tiberio Palacio; Gabriel Rendón
"Mujer latina"	Pedro Neira	Óscar Javier Ferreira
"Plegaria por la paz"	Manuel Fernando	Claudio Martel
"Tengo tiempo"	Luz Aída	Óscar Iván; Luz Aída Gutiérrez
"Tu pueblo y mi pueblo"	Jaime Mora	Víctor Manuel García; Santander Díaz
"Velero negro"	Támara	Santander Durán Escalona

=== Final ===
The final was held on Friday 23 September 1983, beginning at 20:30 COT (01:30+1 UTC), at Teatro de Cristóbal Colón in Bogotá, and was presented by Carlos Pinzón. The participating entries were accompanied by an orchestra and choir conducted by Álvaro Ortiz. The show featured a guest performance by the ballet of Delia Zapata Olivella.

The jury was composed of Jorge Villamil, Bernardo Hoyos, Alfonso Lizarazo, and Sandra Milena.

The winner was "Tu pueblo y mi pueblo", written by Víctor Manuel García and Santander Díaz, and performed by Jaime Mora; with "Mujer latina", written by Óscar Javier Ferreira, and performed by Pedro Neira, placing second; and "Caras", written and performed by Gloria María Bermúdez, placing third. While "Tu pueblo y mi pueblo" went on to represent Colombia at the OTI Festival 1983, "Mujer latina" went on to represent Colombia at the 1984 Viña del Mar International Song Festival, and "Caras" went on to represent Colombia at the Festival de Lima.

Winner

Result of the final of the National OTI Festival – Colombia 1983
R/O	Song	Artist	Result
1	"Caras"	Gloria María Bermúdez	3
2	"Aires de Cumbia"	Antún Castro	—N/a
3	"Flor de mi vivir"	Myriam González	—N/a
4	"Velero negro"	Támara	—N/a
5	"Mujer latina"	Pedro Neira	2
6	"Tu pueblo y mi pueblo"	Jaime Mora	1
7	"Los caminos del olvido"	Liz	—N/a
8	"Cansado de andar"	Álvaro González	—N/a
9	"Tengo tiempo"	Luz Aída	—N/a
10	"Plegaria por la paz"	Manuel Fernando	—N/a
11	"Mi ruego"	Greta	—N/a
12	"Enséñame"	Miguel Fernando	—N/a

== At the OTI Festival ==
On 29 October 1983, the OTI Festival was held at the DAR Constitution Hall in Washington, D.C., United States, hosted by Spanish International Network (SIN), and broadcast live throughout Ibero-America. Jaime Mora performed "Tu pueblo y mi pueblo" in position 11, with Álvaro Ortiz conducting the event's orchestra, and placing third out of 21 competing entries.

=== Voting ===
Each participating broadcaster, or group of broadcasters that jointly participated representing a country, appointed a juror who secretly scored each entry in a scale of 5–1 points, except for the entry representing its own country. The Colombian juror was Jorge Villamil.
