= OTI Festival 1983 =

12th OTI Song Festival

Date and venue
- Final: 29 October 1983
- Venue: DAR Constitution Hall; Washington, D.C., United States

Organization
- Organizer: Organización de Televisión Iberoamericana (OTI)

Production
- Host broadcaster: Spanish International Network (SIN)
- Director: Joshua White
- Musical director: Héctor Garrido
- Presenters: Rafael Pineda; Ana Carlota

Participants
- Number of entries: 21
- Returning countries: Paraguay
- Non-returning countries: Bolivia
- Participation map: Participating countries Countries that participated in the past but not in 1983

Vote
- Voting system: Each of the 21 jurors scored each entry in a scale of 5–1 points
- Winning song: Brazil "Estrela de papel"

The OTI Festival 1983 (Spanish: Decimosegundo Gran Premio de la Canción Iberoamericana, Portuguese: Décimo Segundo Grande Prêmio da Canção Ibero-Americana) was the 12th edition of the OTI Festival, held on 29 October 1983 at the DAR Constitution Hall in Washington, D.C., United States, and presented by Rafael Pineda and Ana Carlota. It was organised by the Organización de Televisión Iberoamericana (OTI) and host broadcaster the Spanish International Network (SIN).

Broadcasters from twenty-one countries participated in the festival. The winner was the song "Estrela de papel", written by Jessé and Elifas Andreato, and performed by Jessé himself representing Brazil; with "Olvidar, olvidar", written by Cheo Zorrilla, and performed by Taty Salas representing the Dominican Republic, placing second; and "Tu pueblo y mi pueblo", written by Víctor Manuel García and Santander Díaz, and performed by Jaime Mora representing Colombia, placing third.

== Location ==
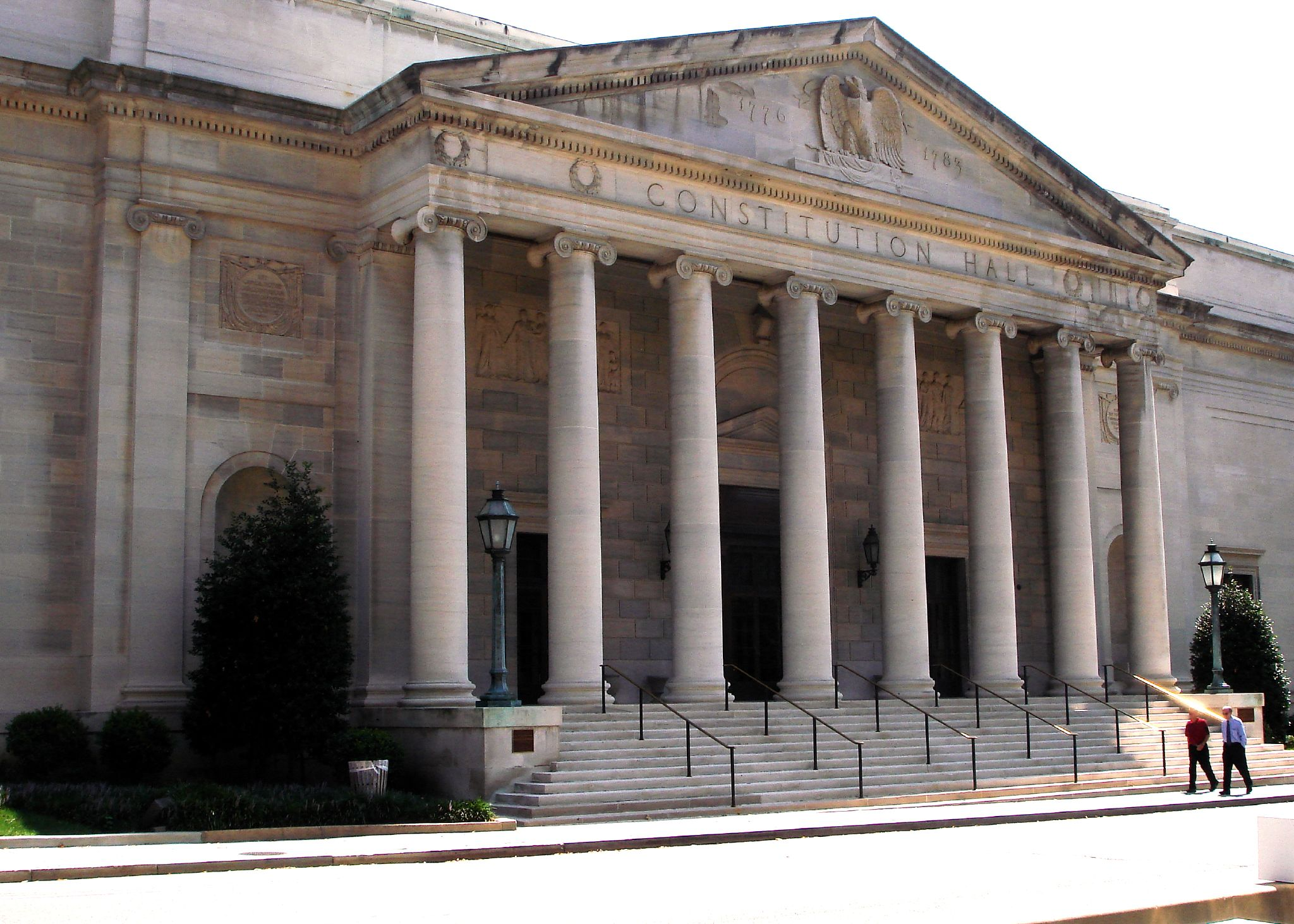
DAR Constitution Hall, Washington, D.C. – venue of the OTI Festival 1983.

The Organización de Televisión Iberoamericana (OTI) designated the Spanish International Network (SIN) as the host broadcaster for the 12th edition of the OTI Festival. SIN staged the event in Washington, D.C.. The venue selected was the DAR Constitution Hall, a building designed by John Russell Pope and opened in 1929 by the Daughters of the American Revolution to house its annual convention. It has been a major cultural center of the city since its construction, and houses its largest auditorium.

== Participants ==
Broadcasters from twenty-one countries participated in this edition of the OTI festival. The OTI members, public or private broadcasters from Spain and twenty Spanish and Portuguese speaking countries of Ibero-America signed up for the festival. From the countries that participated in the previous edition, Bolivia did not return; with Paraguay returning after missing that festival.

Some of the participating broadcasters, such as those representing Chile, Colombia, Mexico, the Netherlands Antilles, Paraguay, and the United States, selected their entries through their regular national televised competitions. Other broadcasters decided to select their entry internally.

Participants of the OTI Festival 1983
Country	Broadcaster(s)	Song	Artist	Songwriter(s)	Language	Conductor
Argentina	Canal Once	"Charlaciones"	Silvina Garré	Litto Nebbia	Spanish	Horacio Malvicino
Brazil	SBT	"Estrela de papel"	Jessé	Jessé; Elifas Andreato	Portuguese	Daniel Alberto Salinas
Chile	TVN; UCTV; UTV	"La misma vida, el mismo modo"	Wildo	Wildo	Spanish	Francisco Aranda
Colombia	Caracol Televisión; PUNCH; RTI	"Tu pueblo y mi pueblo"	Jaime Mora	Víctor Manuel García; Santander Díaz	Spanish	Álvaro Ortiz
Costa Rica	Telecentro; Teletica	"Gracias amor"	Manuel Chamorro	Manuel Chamorro	Spanish	Carlos Guzmán
Dominican Republic	Telesistema Dominicano	"Olvidar, olvidar"	Taty Salas	Cheo Zorrilla	Spanish	Manuel Tejada
Ecuador		"Menos de ti"	Nicky Bravo	Freddy Bardellini	Spanish	Héctor Garrido
El Salvador		"Del principio al final"	Ernesto Guerra	Ernesto Guerra	Spanish	Julio Jaramillo
Guatemala	Televisiete	"Concierto"	Óscar Rolando Ortega	Óscar Rolando Ortega	Spanish	Óscar Salazar
Honduras	TNH	"Empieza"	Jorge Gómez	Jorge Gómez	Spanish	Víctor Durán
Mexico	Televisa	"Compás de espera"	María Medina	Amparo Rubín	Spanish	Chucho Ferrer
Netherlands Antilles	ATM	"En cada nota cantará tu voz"	Claudius Philips	Ricardo del Carmen González; Claudius Philips	Spanish	Franklin Granadillo
Nicaragua	SSTV	"Pobre de ti y de mí"	René Oliver	René Oliver	Spanish	Héctor Garrido
Panama	TVN	"Recuerdos"	Betzaida	Edwin Silvera	Spanish	Toby Muñoz
Paraguay	Teledifusora Paraguaya; TCC	"Soñaremos como ayer"	Marco de Brix	Antonio Medina Boselli	Spanish	Héctor Garrido
Peru		"Cierra la puerta"	Arturo Morales	Félix Yosi	Spanish	Víctor Cuadros
Puerto Rico	Canal 2 Telemundo	"Navegaré"	Edgardo Huertas	Lou Briel	Spanish	Héctor Garrido
Spain	TVE	"Quien piensa en ti"	Gonzalo	Gonzalo Fernández	Spanish	Danilo Vaona
United States	SIN	"Has vencido"	Jorge Baglietto	Vilma Planas	Spanish	Daniel Freiberg
Uruguay	Sociedad Televisora Larrañaga	"Historia del buen ladrón"	Mario Echevarría	Mario Echevarría	Spanish	Julio Frade
Venezuela	Venevisión	"Esperanza americana"	María Teresa Chacín	Chelique Sarabia	Spanish	Eduardo Cabrera

== Festival overview ==
The festival was held on Saturday 29 October 1983, beginning at 19:00 EDT (23:00 UTC). It was directed by Joshua White, and presented by Rafael Pineda and Ana Carlota. The musical director was Héctor Garrido, who conducted the orchestra when required. The draw to determine the running order (R/O) was held at the SIN offices in New York City a few days before the festival.

The opening act featured a recorded welcoming greeting from the President of the United States, Ronald Reagan, who spoke about the contributions of the Latino community in the US and how he greatly improved the celebration of Hispanic Heritage Week, in which he would later make it into what's now Hispanic Heritage Month, and a guest performance by Rubén Blades. After the awards ceremony and the reprise of the winning song, Plácido Domingo made a guest performance.

After the performances of the competing songs, the countries that had finished in the top-5 were announced, without specifying their position. Six entries finished in the top-5, since there was a tie for fifth place. Only the ranking of the top three songs were revealed. The winner was the song "Estrela de papel", written by Jessé and Elifas Andreato, and performed by Jessé himself representing Brazil; with "Olvidar, olvidar", written by Cheo Zorrilla, and performed by Taty Salas representing the Dominican Republic, placing second; and "Tu pueblo y mi pueblo", written by Víctor Manuel García and Santander Díaz, and performed by Jaime Mora representing Colombia, placing third. Each of the performers of these entries received a trophy while their songwriters received a medallion. The first prize trophy was delivered by Guillermo Cañedo, president of OTI; the second prize trophy by Nicanor González, vice-president of OTI; and the third prize trophy by Rosita Perú, representative of SIN.

Winner

Results of the OTI Festival 1983
R/O	Country	Song	Artist	Result
1	Puerto Rico	"Navegaré"	Edgardo Huertas	—N/a
2	Guatemala	"Concierto"	Óscar Rolando Ortega	—N/a
3	Venezuela	"Esperanza americana"	María Teresa Chacín	Top-5
4	Panama	"Recuerdos"	Betzaida	—N/a
5	Ecuador	"Menos de ti"	Nicky Bravo	—N/a
6	Honduras	"Empieza"	Jorge Gómez	—N/a
7	Brazil	"Estrela de papel"	Jessé	1
8	Chile	"La misma vida, el mismo modo"	Wildo	—N/a
9	United States	"Has vencido"	Jorge Baglietto	—N/a
10	Paraguay	"Soñaremos como ayer"	Marco de Brix	Top-5
11	Colombia	"Tu pueblo y mi pueblo"	Jaime Mora	3
12	Peru	"Cierra la puerta"	Arturo Morales	—N/a
13	Argentina	"Charlaciones"	Silvina Garré	—N/a
14	Mexico	"Compás de espera"	María Medina	—N/a
15	Costa Rica	"Gracias amor"	Manuel Chamorro	—N/a
16	El Salvador	"Del principio al final"	Ernesto Guerra	—N/a
17	Spain	"Quien piensa en ti"	Gonzalo	—N/a
18	Dominican Republic	"Olvidar, olvidar"	Taty Salas	2
19	Uruguay	"Historia del buen ladrón"	Mario Echevarría	—N/a
20	Nicaragua	"Pobre de ti y de mí"	René Oliver	—N/a
21	Netherlands Antilles	"En cada nota cantará tu voz"	Claudius Philips	Top-5

=== Jurors ===
Each participating broadcaster (Note: Or group of broadcasters that jointly participated representing a country.) appointed a juror, and all jurors were present in the hall. Each of them scored each entry in a scale of 5–1 points, except for the entry representing its own country. They voted immediately after each performance using an electronic terminal on their desk, and the points were recorded by a computer and stored in a database. In the event of a tie for first place, they would have vote again. If the tie had persisted, the chairperson would have decided the winner. The 21 jurors were:

- Puerto Rico – Johanna Rosaly
- Guatemala – María Zúñiga de Landis
- Venezuela – Teresa Alegrett
- Panama – Dora B. de Boyd
- Ecuador – Alfonso Espinosa de los Monteros
- Honduras – Jacobo Goldstein
- Brazil – Aretusa Garibaldi Fonseca
- Chile – Antonio Vodanovic (chairperson)
- United States – Luis de Llano
- Paraguay – Mario López Escobar
- Colombia – Jorge Villamil
- Peru – Pablo de Madalengoitia
- Argentina – Mario Clavell
- Mexico – Lucía Méndez
- Costa Rica – Jorge Salazar
- El Salvador – Rafael Barrientos
- Spain – Julio Mengod
- Dominican Republic – Manuel Quiroz
- Uruguay – Aníbal Da Silva
- Nicaragua – Otto de la Rocha
- Netherlands Antilles – Joy Kock

== Broadcast ==
The festival was broadcast in the 21 participating countries, where the corresponding OTI member broadcasters relayed the contest through their networks after receiving it live via satellite.

Known details on the broadcasts in each country, including the specific broadcasting stations and commentators are shown in the tables below.

Broadcasters and commentators in participating countries
Country	Broadcaster	Channel(s)	Commentator(s)	Ref.
Argentina	Canal Once (Note: Delayed broadcast at 22:00 ART (01:00+1 UTC))			
Chile	TVN	Canal 7 (Note: Delayed broadcast at 21:30 CLST (00:30+1 UTC))		
Chile	UTV	Canal 11		
Chile	UCTV	Canal 13		
Costa Rica	Telecentro	Telecentro Canal 6		
Costa Rica	Teletica	Canal 7		
Mexico	Televisa	Canal 2		
Netherlands Antilles	ATM	TeleAruba		
Netherlands Antilles	ATM	TeleCuraçao		
Puerto Rico	Canal 2 Telemundo (Note: Delayed broadcast at 21:00 AST (01:00+1 UTC))			
Spain	TVE	TVE 1	Carlos Tena	
United States	SIN			

Broadcasters and commentators in non-participating countries
Country	Broadcaster	Channel(s)	Commentator(s)	Ref.
Canada	CFMT-TV (Note: Delayed broadcast at 21:00 EDT (01:00+1 UTC))			
