= César Costa =

Mexican singer and actor

Cesar Costa
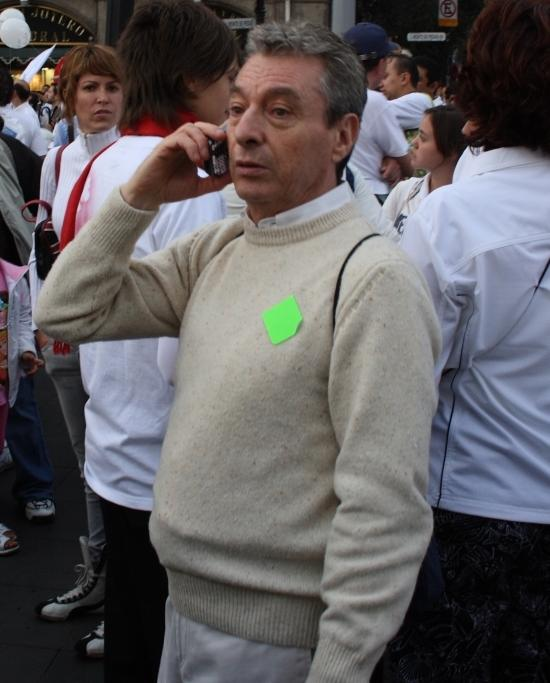
- Born: César Roel Schreurs; August 13, 1941 (age 85); Mexico City, Mexico
- Occupations: Singer, actor

César Roel Schreurs, best known as César Costa, is a Mexican actor and rock-and-roll singer.

Costa was born in Colonia Condesa of the Mexican capital. He studied elementary and Junior Highschool at the German College and Law at the Universidad Nacional Autónoma de México (UNAM).

== Music career ==
He started his musical career at the age of 17 as César Roel singing and playing guitar with the rock-and-roll band Los Black Jeans ("The Black Jeans"), singing Spanish versions of American hit singles, including their single release, La batalla de Jericó. They recorded their first album in 1959 with Peerless Records. His backup singer was world-renowned tenor Plácido Domingo.

When the band signed with Musart Records the band changed its name to Los Camisas Negras ("The Black Shirts") and César Roel to Cesar Costa (honoring music arranger Don Costa). Soon after, the band disintegrated and César started a successful solo career, recording three albums with Orfeón Records. Then with RCA Mexicana he recorded romantic songs.

In 1983, he participated in the 12th Mexican national selection for the OTI Festival and obtained the second place with the song "Tierno ("Tender"), written by Sergio Andrade.

== Acting career ==
Supported by his success in the music industry, he joined other singers in films of the Cinema of Mexico such as Angélica María, Enrique Guzmán and Alberto Vázquez. In 1961 he made his first film Juventud Rebelde.

In 1986 he starred in the sitcom Papá soltero ("Single Dad"), a show that became a success in Latin America and then was adapted to the screen as Me tengo que casar ("I have to get married"). In the 1980s he hosted a comedy show "La Carabina De Ambrosio" and in the 1990s a talk show with model Rebecca de Alba called Un Nuevo Día and next year Al Fin de Semana.

In 1993 he presented a show together with Angélica María, Enrique Guzmán, Manolo Muñoz and Alberto Vásquez at the Auditorio Nacional with great success. He also had a radio show called De Costa a Costa ("From coast to coast") broadcast on Cadena ACIR. As of 2005 he has a TV show called Ensalada César ("Caesar salad") on Canal Once of the Instituto Politécnico Nacional.

== Honors ==
- Mexican ambassador to the UNICEF on August 17, 2004
- Mister Amigo 2001
- Inducted into the Paseo de las Luminarias at the Plaza de las Estrellas in Mexico City for his work in television and in the recording industry.

== Albums ==
- Un Vaso de Vino
- Chao! Amiga
- Corazón Loco
- Jornada Sentimental
- Tu Amor... y Mi Cariño
- Lo Nuevo...
- La Historia de Tommy
- Para Enamorados
- Sinceramente
- Canta
- César Costa y Los Camisas Negras (1960)

== TV shows ==
- "Ensalada César" (2006)
- Al fin de semana (1998)
- Un nuevo día (1994–1997)
- Papá soltero (1987–1994) as César
- La carabina de Ambrosio (1978–1983)
- Alegrias (1968)

== Films ==
- Me tengo que casar (Papá soltero, 1995)
- Bang bang... al hoyo (1971)
- Caín, Abel y el otro (1971)
- Al fin a solas (1969)
- Romance sobre ruedas (1969)
- El mundo loco de los jóvenes (1967)
- Arrullo de Dios (1967)
- Adios cuñado! (1967)
- Que haremos con papá? (1966)
- La juventud se impone (1964)
- La edad de la violencia (1964)
- Premier Orfeon (1964) TV Series
- Dile que la quiero (1963)
- El cielo y la tierra (1962)
- Si yo fuera millonario (1962)
- Juventud rebelde (1961)
