= Gracias Martín =

Gracias Martin

Studio album by Los Caminantes
- Released: 1987
- Genre: Regional Mexican
- Length: 28:35
- Label: Luna

Los Caminantes chronology
De Guanajuato...Para America! (1986)	Gracias Martin (1987)	Los Idolos Del Pueblo (1988)

Gracias Martin is the eighth studio album by Mexican group Los Caminantes, released in 1987. It is also a tribute album dedicated to keyboardist Martín Ramírez, the younger brother of Agustín, Brígido, and Horacio Ramírez. Martín was killed in a tour bus accident earlier in the year of the album release.

== Cover art ==
On the album cover art, there is a photograph of Martín along with a message below that reads, "Con cariño dedicamos este álbum a tu recuerdo en nuestro corazón." (trans: "Lovingly dedicate this album to your memory in our hearts.").

== Track listing ==
No.	Title	Writer(s)	Length
1.	"Todo Me Gusta De Ti"	Agustín Ramírez	2:51
2.	"Esperando Estas"	Martín Ramírez	3:01
3.	"Y Dicen"		2:32
4.	"El Toro Barcino"	Roberto Fausto	3:01
5.	"Batiendo Mi Chocolate"		2:52
6.	"Ya No Quiero Tu Cariño"	Brígido Ramírez	2:54
7.	"Te Vi Partir"	Horacio Ramírez	2:59
8.	"Y Mis Lagrimas Bebi"	Isidro Emmanuel	2:21
9.	"Que Linda Eres"		3:12
10.	"Tu Amor y Mis Recuerdos"		2:52
