= Pablo Herrero =

Spanish musician and composer (1942–2023)

Pablo Herrero Ibarz (Madrid, Spain, 7 September 1942 – 5 December 2023) was a Spanish musician and composer.

== Career ==
In 1965 he was a member of the instrumental group Los Relámpagos, which he left in 1968 together with José Luis Armenteros. In a production company called Mecenas, the two took a new direction in their careers, producing and composing for other artists such as Doctor Pop, and Juan Bau.

Between them, they composed some of the most famous songs of the second half of the 20th century in Spanish music, becoming an important and prolific composition and production team in Spain. Their songs were performed by singers such as Fórmula V, Nino Bravo, Serafín Zubiri, Juan Bau, Francisco, Basilio, Jarcha and Rocío Jurado. They also composed "Libertad sin ira", an emblematic song that represented the Spanish political transition and was performed by the group Jarcha. The song "Venezuela" is one of the most emblematic songs for that country. The song has been covered by many artists.

Herrero had almost 800 works registered with the SGAE. He was vice-president of the SGAE. He died on 5th December 2023 at the age of 81. He was a member of the vintage group Trastos viejos, with old musicians from the sixties and seventies:

- José Luis Armenteros: guitar (until his death on 11 June 2016).
- Eduardo Buddy García Velasco: vocals (Los Charcos and Los Camperos).
- Fernando Mariscal: drums (Los Zipi y Zape, Los Polaris and Los Relámpagos).
- Eduardo Talavera: electric bass (Los Saturnos and Los Relámpagos).
- Luis Álvarez: lead guitar (Los Tiburones, Los Kurois, Los Dayson, Vicky y Los Polaris and some performances with Los Relámpagos).

== Discography as a composer with José Luis Armenteros ==
- "Tierras lejanas" ( performed by Basilio).
- "Un beso y una flor" ( performed by Nino Bravo).
- "Libre"" and "América, América" (performed by Nino Bravo).
- "Star of David" (performed by Juan Bau).
- "Tengo tu amor" (performed by Fórmula V).
- "Cuéntame"(performed by Fórmula V).
- "Cinderella" (performed by Formula V).
- "Eva María" (performed by Fórmula V).
- "Freedom without anger" (performed by Jarcha).
- "Como una ola" (performed by Rocío Jurado).
- "Latino" (performed by Francisco).
- "Venezuela" (performed by Balbino).
- "Jamás la olvidaré" ( performed by Basilio).
- "Shalom", "Atrévete", "Amar es algo más", "Me vas a echar de menos", "Siempre acabo por llorar", "Te quiero abrazar", "Solo espero que me perdones", "Adivina de donde soy" ( performed by José Luis Rodríguez "El Puma").
