= Porque Tengo Tu Amor =

Studio album by Los Caminantes
- Released: 1984
- Genre: Regional Mexican
- Length: 29:19
- Label: Luna

Los Caminantes chronology
| Corridos Al Estilo De Los Caminantes (1984) | Porque Tengo Tu Amor (1984) | Cada Dia Mejor (1985) |

Porque Tengo Tu Amor is the fifth studio album by Mexican group Los Caminantes, released in 1984.

== Track listing ==
| No. | Title | Writer(s) | Length |
|---|---|---|---|
| 1. | "Porque Tengo Tu Amor" | | 3:15 |
| 2. | "No Sigas Llorando" | Fernando Z. Maldonado | 2:42 |
| 3. | "Quiero Que Sepas" | | 2:55 |
| 4. | "El Caiman" | | 3:05 |
| 5. | "Dos Flores, Dos Amores" | Agustín y Brígido Ramírez | 2:47 |
| 6. | "Tristes Recuerdos" | Agustín y Brígido Ramírez | 2:59 |
| 7. | "Lloraremos Los Dos" | Fernando Z. Maldonado | 3:02 |
| 8. | "Gritenme Piedras Del Campo" | Cuco Sánchez | 3:05 |
| 9. | "Baila Mi Cumbia" | | 2:52 |
| 10. | "Pajarillo Baranqueño" | Alfonso Esparza Oteo | 2:37 |
