= Rafael Pineda (television journalist) =

Cuban-American television news reporter (1937–2026)

Julio Rafael Pineda (December 20, 1937 – January 25, 2026) was a Cuban-American television news anchor who spent more than four decades at WXTV, the Univision affiliate serving New York City. He anchored the station's Spanish-language newscast from 1972 until his retirement in 2013, becoming the longest-serving television news anchor in the New York market across all languages.

== Life and career ==
Pineda was born in Baracoa, Cuba, on December 20, 1937. He immigrated to the United States before his 20th birthday.

He began his career at the Spanish-language station WXTV in 1968, the year the station signed on, and became the lead anchor of its newscast, Noticias Univision 41, in 1972. On October 29, 1983, he co-hosted the OTI Festival 1983 alongside Ana Carlota.

Pineda retired in 2013. He died on January 25, 2026, at the age of 88.

== Awards and recognition ==
In 2000, Pineda became the first Latino inducted into the Silver Circle of the National Academy of Television Arts and Sciences. He was a recipient of an Emmy Award and seven ACE Awards for best news anchor, and in 2005 received the HOLA Award for Excellence in Spanish-Language Media from the Hispanic Organization of Latin Actors. On June 5, 2005, he was honored by Union City, New Jersey, with a star on the Walk of Fame at the city's Celia Cruz Park. In November 2013, he was inducted into the New York State Broadcasters Association Hall of Fame.
