= Nico Rezende =

Antonio Martins Correia Filho (born in São Paulo, SP), known professionally as Nico Rezende, is a Brazilian singer, composer and musical arranger.

== Biography ==
Filho has studied piano, classic guitar and techniques of synthesizers. He started his career by playing in orchestras at balls. In 1983, Filho moved to Rio de Janeiro, where he started to work as a keyboard player in the musical band of the singer Ritchie. Later, he made the arrangements for the albums of Marina Lima, Gal Costa, Roberto Carlos, Lulu Santos, Beto Guedes, Simone, Zizi Possi, Cazuza, Barão Vermelho, Erasmo Carlos, Kiko Zambianchi and Dalto, besides other artists.

In 1987, he recorded his first LP record, Nico Rezende, with prominence to his composition "Esquece e vem" (with Paulinho Lima), the theme of the soap opera O outro (of Rede Globo).

== Discography ==
- 1987 — Nico Rezende, WEA, LP
- 1988 — Jogo de ilusões, WEA, LP
- 1989 — Nico, WEA, LP
- 1990 — Tudo ficou pra trás, Esfinge, LP
- 1995 — Nico Rezende, Luz da Cidade, CD
- 2001 — Curta a vida, CD
- 2007 — Paraíso Invisível, CD

== Bibliography ==
- ALBIN, Ricardo Cravo. Dicionário Houaiss Ilustrado Música Popular Brasileira – Creation and General Direction by Ricardo Cravo Albin. Rio de Janeiro: Instituto Antônio Houaiss, Instituto Cultural Cravo Albin and Editora Paracatu, 2006.
- AMARAL, Euclides. Alguns Aspectos da MPB. Rio de Janeiro: author's edition, 2008. 2nd ed. Esteio Editora, 2010.

== See also ==
- Música popular brasileira
