= Cada Día Mejor =

Cada Dia Mejor

Studio album by Los Caminantes
- Released: 1985
- Genre: Regional Mexican
- Length: 31:59
- Label: Luna

Los Caminantes chronology
Porque Tengo Tu Amor (1984)	Cada Dia Mejor (1985)	De Guanajuato...Para America! (1986)

Cada Dia Mejor is the sixth studio album by Mexican group Los Caminantes, released in 1985.

== Track listing ==
No.	Title	Writer(s)	Length
1.	"Que Te Hagan Sufrir"	Brígido Ramírez	2:55
2.	"Robaste Mi Amor"	Horacio Ramírez	2:58
3.	"El Carbonero"	Senén Palacio	3:36
4.	"Volar, Volar"	Agustín Ramírez	2:56
5.	"Pa' Que Me Sirve La Vida"	Chucho Monge	3:36
6.	"Ven y Abrazame"	Agustín Ramírez	3:47
7.	"Llegando A Ti"	José Alfredo Jiménez	2:50
8.	"Blanca Palomita"		2:38
9.	"Mi Ultima Parranda"		3:45
10.	"Ya Viene Amaneciendo"		2:58
