= Hotel Nacional Rio =

- The original logo of the Hotel Nacional Rio

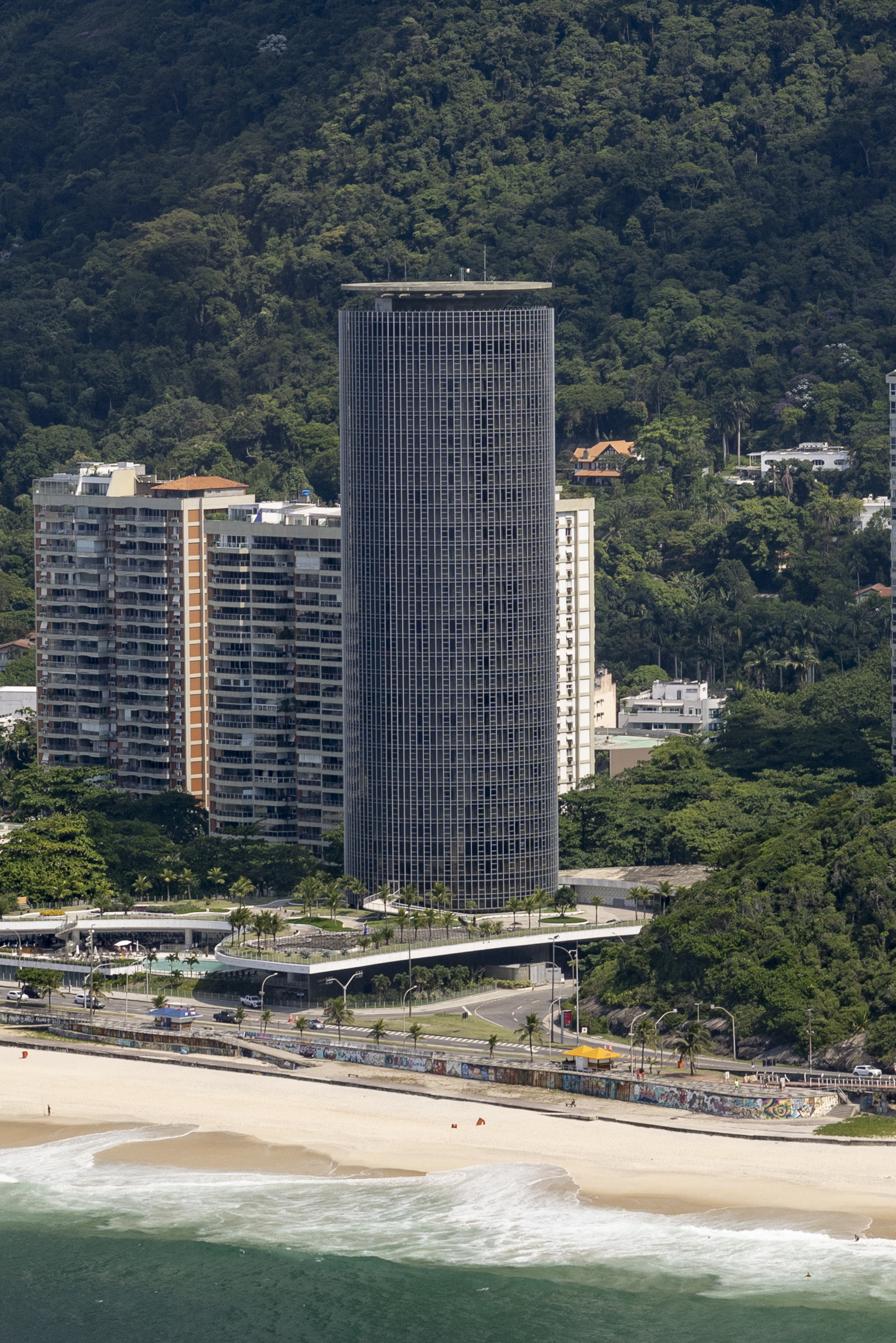
- Hotel Nacional

- Location within Rio de Janeiro

General information
- Status: Completed
- Type: Skyscraper
- Architectural style: Modernism
- Classification: Hotel
- Location: São Conrado, Avenida Niemeyer 769, Rio de Janeiro, Brazil
- Coordinates: 22°59′52.678″S 43°15′25.61″W
- Construction started: 1968
- Completed: 1972
- Renovated: 2015
- Renovation cost: $67 million
- Owner: Marcelo Henrique Limíri Gonçalves

Height
- Architectural: 356.23 feet (108.58 m)
- Tip: 356.23 feet (108.58 m)
- Roof: 356.23 feet (108.58 m)

Technical details
- Floor count: 34

Design and construction
- Architect: Oscar Niemeyer
- Structural engineer: Bruno Contarini

Renovating team
- Architect: Marcos Bastos
- Renovating firm: VOA
- Structural engineer: Bruno Contarini
- Other designers: John Niemeyer
- Main contractor: HN Empreendimentos e Participações

The Hotel Nacional Rio is a skyscraper hotel in the São Conrado neighbourhood of Rio de Janeiro, Brazil. The 108-metre, 34-storey building was constructed from 1968 until 1972 and designed by famed architect Oscar Niemeyer, who was considered to be one of the key figures in the development of modern architecture. The hotel closed in 1995 following a steady decline in customers and the proximity to a crime ridden neighborhood. It was restored and reopened in 2017.

== History ==
The hotel was designed by legendary Brazilian architect Oscar Niemeyer in the late 1960s. He originally planned 55 floors for the building, but the owner of the Horsa Hotels network, entrepreneur Jose Tjurs, preferred to build only 34. The Hotel Nacional opened in 1972 as part of Tjurs’s Horsa Hotels network. The hotel was part of push to develop the western part of Rio.

The sleek modernist glass, aluminum and concrete building in the beachfront neighborhood of São Conrado housed a convention center for 2,800 people and a theater for approximately 1,400 spectators where artists such as Liza Minnelli, B.B. King, Chet Baker and James Brown have performed. It featured five restaurants, helicopter air taxi service from its helipad and original artwork and sculpture and played host to the Rio Film Festival in the 1980s. Considered the most modern hotel in Latin America when it opened, it quickly became a Brazilian design icon. The hotel was later renamed Hotel Horsa Nacional Rio.

In September 1976, the International Atomic Energy Agency held its twentieth regular session in the hotel's conference centre.

=== Decline ===
After it closed in 1995, the hotel fell on hard times. After the interior fixtures and furnishings were removed — the structure was "stripped for spare parts," even down to the elevators being removed from the shafts — the hotel became a home to squatters and a canvas for graffiti artists and bats which had been feeding off nearby coconut trees and took up residence in the convention center. Despite being landmarked by the city of Rio in 1998, there was no funding to restore it. However, the 2016 Olympics provided the impetus for building up Rio's hotel industry.

In 2013, a wayward Justin Bieber was arrested for spray painting the interior of the hotel.

=== Restoration ===
For two decades, the building was abandoned and neglected, covered in graffiti. Businessman Marcelo Henrique Limírio Gonçalves bought the property in 2009 for $35 million. In January 2015, the architectural design firm VOA Brazil won the competition to design the retrofit of the entire building. VOA was challenged to respect the original design and to preserve some of the original interior elements while creating a modern hotel with contemporary amenities. The detailed renovation project involved contractor consultations with engineer Bruno Contarini, the structural designer who participated in the original construction of the building. VOA’s design efforts included the restoration of art works by renowned artists including the “Mermaid” sculpture by Alfredo Ceschiatti, the Carybé panel and the suspended sculpture by Pedro Corrêa de Araújo.

The project, estimated to cost $67 million, called for a 476-room hotel and an apartment annex boasting 240-plus units, as well as exhibition space, a spa and a Niemeyer Bar on the top floor. The apartments, convention space, and rooftop bar were never built, but the hotel reopened in January 2017 as the Gran Meliá Nacional Rio de Janeiro Hotel.

On March 12, 2018, Meliá Hotels ceased operating the hotel, as it lacked convention facilities and could not generate enough business to support itself. In addition, the Brazilian economic crisis and continuing high violent crime rates in the area contributed to the chain's decision. The owners of the hotel, a group of investors from Goiana, operate the hotel independently as the Hotel Nacional Rio.
