= Supe Perder =

Studio album by Los Caminantes
- Released: 1983
- Genre: Regional Mexican
- Length: 29:53
- Label: Luna

Los Caminantes chronology
Supe Perder (1983)	Especialmente Para Usted (1983)

Supe Perder is the debut album by Mexican group Los Caminantes, released in 1983. It contains the title track "Supe Perder."

== Cover art ==
Its album cover art is the only cover art which features the four brothers Agustín, Brígido, Horacio and Martín Ramírez together.

== Track listing ==
No.	Title	Writer(s)	Length
1.	"Supe Perder"	Brígido Ramírez	3:01
2.	"Entrega Total"	Abelardo Pulido	2:51
3.	"Dime Si Me Quieres"	Horacio Ramírez	3:14
4.	"Palomita Mensajera"	Agustín Ramírez	3:07
5.	"Hace Un Año"	Felipe Valdez Leal	2:48
6.	"Para Que Quieres Volver"	Agustín Ramírez	2:51
7.	"La Pajarera"	Tomás Ponce	3:11
8.	"Cobardemente"	Hermanos Martínez Gil	2:33
9.	"Vuela Paloma"	Gozina y Cherubine	3:15
10.	"Regresare"	Agustín Ramírez	3:02
