= Edmundo Villani-Côrtes =

Brazilian pianist (born 1930)

- Born: 8 November 1930 (age 95); Juiz de Fora, Minas Gerais, Brazil
- Occupations: Conductor, composer, educator, arranger
- Instrument: Piano

Edmundo Villani-Côrtes (born 8 November 1930) is a Brazilian pianist, conductor, arranger, music professor and composer.

== Biography ==
Villani-Côrtes was born in Juiz de Fora, Minas Gerais. He started out as a musician at age 9 by playing the cavaquinho, acoustic guitar and piano. He graduated from the Brazilian Conservatory of Music in Rio de Janeiro in 1954. Back to his hometown, he took and finished a law degree at the Federal University of Juiz de Fora, having premiered there his own Concerto n.º 1 para piano e orquestra (Concerto No 1 for Piano and Orchestra) in 1956. Once in São Paulo, where he moved to study under José Kliass, he became a pupil of composer Camargo Guarnieri and an arranger of advertisement music; there, he won an honourable mention from the Brazilian branch of Goethe-Institut with his Noneto (Nonet) in 1978. In 1986, he won both first and second prizes in a contest organised by Editora Brasil Cultural (Brazil Cultural Publishing). Villani-Côrtes completed his master's degree in composition in 1988 at the Federal University of Rio de Janeiro. He taught composition and counterpoint at the State University of São Paulo, where he also obtained his PhD in 1998. In 1995, his work Postais Paulistanos (Postcards from São Paulo) was commended by the Associação Paulista de Críticos de Arte (São Paulo Association of Art Critics), which handed him a total of seven awards between 1990 and 2012, including a lifetime achievement award.

Between 1992 and 1996, Villani-Côrtes was a faculty member of the Festival Internacional de Inverno de Campos do Jordão (Campos do Jordão International Winter Festival). In 2014, the Festival de Música Contemporânea Brasileira (Festival of Brazilian Contemporary Music) honoured his life's work.

Villani-Côrtes is also a celebrated pianist and conductor. As a pianist, he worked with the Orquestra Filarmônica de Juiz de Fora (Juiz de Fora Philharmonic Orchestra), several radio and television orchestras and musical ensembles, including the Jô Soares late-night talk show band. As a conductor, he fronted the São Paulo Jazz Symphony Orchestra between 1990 and 1999.

While drawing on the influence of Shostakovitch and French impressionists Ravel and Debussy, Villani-Côrtes is not particularly fond of avant-gardism in music. 'A good author', he says, 'shows competent use of the known vocabulary, that everyone understands, in order to convey a new idea with clarity. They don't need to invent a new vocabulary to be original.' He is not clearly associated with any definite aesthetic movement. Villani-Côrtes is a prolific composer with over 300 works for a variety of solo instruments, in addition to chamber and orchestral pieces.
