= Jessé (singer) =

Brazilian singer (1952–1993)

- Born: Jessé Florentino Santos; April 25, 1952; Niterói, Rio de Janeiro, Brazil
- Died: 29 March 1993 (aged 40); Ourinhos, São Paulo, Brazil
- Other names: Christie Burgh and Tony Stevens
- Occupations: Singer, songwriter, musician
- Years active: 1975–1993

Jessé Florentino Santos (April 25, 1952 – March 29, 1993), was a Brazilian singer, songwriter and musician. Recognized for his powerful voice, he performed hits such as "Porto Solidão", "Voa Liberdade", "Solidão de Amigos", among others.

== Biography ==
Jessé was born in the city of Niterói, state of Rio de Janeiro. However, he was raised in Brasilia. At the age of thirteen, he began to develop his musical gift, influenced by his Christian background, in the Presbyterian Church. At fourteen he had already formed his first group, where he played the bass at the city's dances. In 1970, Jessé decided to stay in Brasília and move on with his life.

As an adult, in 1974, Jessé and his friends moved to São Paulo, where he worked as a crooner in nightclubs. Afterwards, he joined the groups Corrente de Força and Placa Luminosa, in which he recorded the song Velho Demais. He recorded in English in the 1970s, under the pseudonyms Christie Burgh (1976) and Tony Stevens (1976–1977). As Tony Stevens, he had a hit with the song If You Could Remember.

Jessé was revealed to the general public in 1980, at the MPB Shell Festival, on Rede Globo. With the song Porto Solidão, his greatest success, he won the award for best interpreter at that festival. Still in 1980, his song Voa Liberdade, burst on the charts of the year 1980. Because of this, the song was included in his album of the year, along with the song Porto Solidão.

He won the OTI Festival 1983 held in Washington, with the song "Estrela de papel" representing Brazil; the song was arranged by São Paulo maestro Daniel Salinas.he recorded 12 albums (such as the double albums O Sorriso ao Pé da Escada and About All Things), but never achieved the laurels of specialized critics.

== Death ==
Jessé died on March 29, 1993, at the age of 40, as a result of head trauma, caused by a car accident. The singer drove a blue Ford Escort XR3 convertible to the city of Terra Rica, Paraná, where he would perform.

== Discography ==
=== As Tony Stevens, in English ===
==== Singles and EPs ====
- Shine, Shine / Baby Baby I Love You (1973)
- If You Could Remember (1976)
- Flying High/ If You Could Remember (1977)
- Flying High/Long Time (1977)

=== As Christie Burgh, in English ===
==== Albums ====
- Unknown – Flying (Various – Hits Again 3 E 4)

==== Compilations ====
- 1999 – Flying (Various – Hits Again)
- 2000 – Flying (Various – Hits Again Duplo)
- 2000 – Flying (Various – Hits Again Volume 1)
- Unknown – Flying (Various – Hits Brazil)

=== As Jessé ===
- Jessé (1980)
- Jessé vol. 2 (1981)
- Jessé vol. 3 (1982)
- Sorriso Ao Pé da Escada (1983)
- Estrela de Papel (1983)
- Sobre Todas As Coisas (1984)
- Ao Meu Pai (1984)
- Todos Os Palcos (1985)
- Eterno Menino (1987)
- Convite Para Ouvir Jessé – Coletânea (1988)
- Jessé – Série Brilho (1988)
- Jessé In Nashville (1989)
- Glória Ao Pai – Coletânea (1991)
- Raízes (1993)
- Voa Liberdade (1993)
- Jessé – 20 Preferidas Vol.1 (1996)
- Jessé – 20 Preferidas Vol.2 (1997)
- Pérolas – Coletânea (2000)
- O Inesquecível Jessé (2003)
