= Especialmente Para Usted =

Studio album by Los Caminantes
- Released: February 1983
- Recorded: December 1982
- Genre: Regional Mexican
- Length: 33:18
- Label: Luna

Los Caminantes chronology
Supe Perder (1983)	Especialmente Para Usted (1983)	Numero Tres (1983)

Especialmente Para Usted is the second studio album by Mexican group Los Caminantes, released in 1983.

== Track listing ==
No.	Title	Writer(s)	Length
1.	"Angel De La Mañana"	Chip Taylor	2:53
2.	"La Cama De Piedra"	Cuco Sánchez	3:10
3.	"Me Esta Doliendo Su Ausencia"	Fernando Z. Maldonado	3:28
4.	"Cumbia Del Sol"	Héctor Quintero	3:04
5.	"Las Gaviotas"	Manuel Esquivel	3:38
6.	"Cuando Dos Almas"	Fructuoso Gandara Reyes	2:56
7.	"La Carcel De Cananea"	Luis Pérez Meza	4:05
8.	"Ramita De Matimba"	Rosendo Martínez	2:44
9.	"Paloma Negra"	Tomás Méndez	3:24
10.	"Cartas Marcadas"	Chucho Monge	3:56
