= Formula V =

Spanish pop band

Fórmula V
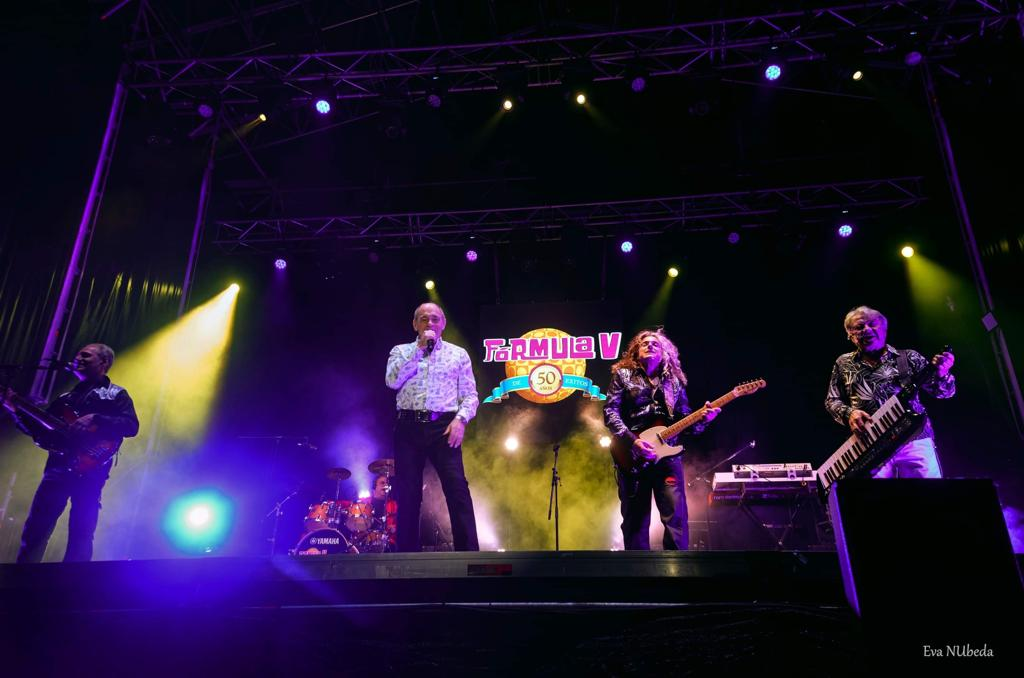
- Formula V Actual

Background information
- Origin: Madrid, Spain
- Genres: Pop
- Years active: 1965–Present
- Labels: Philips
- Members: Paco Pastor, Aaron Lopez, Gianni Scavini, Emilio Sancho, Francisco Martin
- Website: http://www.formulav.es

Fórmula V is a Spanish pop musical quintet founded in 1965 in Spain. The musical style is very much in the style of 60's rock similar to the Beatles and Monkees. In the late 1960s the band experienced enormous popularity in Spain and Latin America.

The group original members are:

- Francisco de Asís Pastor (vocals)(b. 1949 in Madrid, Spain)
- Antonio Sevilla (Drums)
- Mariano Sanz (Bass Guitar) (b. 1948)
- Joaquin de la Pena (Lead Guitar)
- Amador Flores (Keyboards)

The present members are:

- Francisco de Asís Pastor (vocals)(b. 1949 in Madrid, Spain)
- Emilio Sancho (Drums)
- Gianni Scavini (Keyboard)
- Aaron Lopez (Lead Guitar)
- Francisco Martin (Bass Guitar)

They are famous for the songs:

- Eva María
- Cuéntame
- Nueve Sobre Diez
- Ayer Y Hoy
- Vacaciones de Verano
- La Fiesta de Blas
- Carolina

Francisco (also known as Paco Pastor), still tours with Formula V in the new millennium.
