= Los Caminantes =

Mexican grupera band

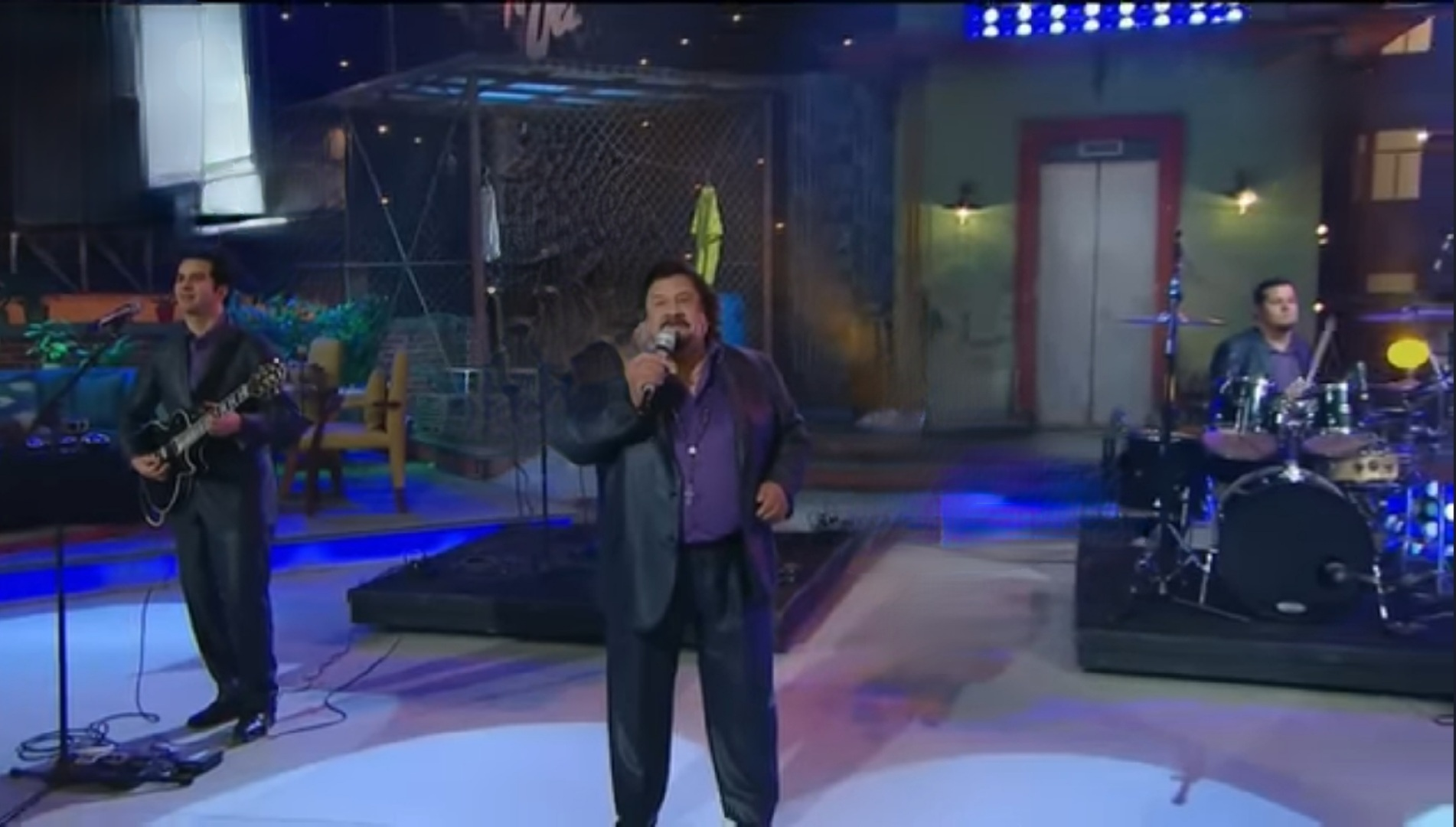
- Los Caminantes performing on Televisa in 2017.

Background information
- Also known as: Los Caminantes Aztecas (1976–1982); Los Chulos Chulos Chulos
- Origin: San Bernardino County, California, United States
- Genres: Regional Mexican
- Years active: 1976–present
- Labels: Discos Olympico Records, Luna Records, Fonovisa Records, Sony Music
- Members: Agustín Ramírez Jr. Anthony Ramírez
- Past members: Agustín Ramírez; Bernardo Ramírez; Martín Ramírez; Brígido Ramírez; Horacio Ramírez; Humberto Navarro
- Website: loscaminantesmusica.com

Los Caminantes are a Mexican grupera band from San Francisco del Rincón, Guanajuato. Originally called Los Caminantes Aztecas, the band was formed in San Bernardino County, California, by brothers Agustín, Brígido, Horacio and Bernardo Ramírez in 1976. They grew up in Guanajuato, Mexico and moved to the United States with their family in the early 1970s. In 1982, Martín Ramírez, the youngest brother of the band, joined the group replacing Bernardo on keyboards. Later, Humberto Navarro joined as their drummer.

They released their debut album, Supe Perder in 1983 with Luna Records, which spawned the hits "Supe Perder," "Para Que Quieres Volver" and "Dime Si Me Quieres." Throughout the mid-1980s to mid-1990s, the band had a number of US Billboard 200 chart hit albums such as 1986's De Guanajuato...Para America! with hit song, "Amor Sin Palabras" ("Love Without Words"). Tragedy struck Los Caminantes when Martín was killed in a bus accident. In the same year a tribute album, 1987's Gracias Martin, was dedicated to him. In 1990, they released a film, Caminantes...Si Hay Caminos, starring as themselves.

Los Caminantes are commonly referred to as Los Chulos, Chulos, Chulos to the public. A nickname given by a disc jockey from their De Guanajuato...Para America! era. As they were seen wearing formal tuxedos, "¡Llegaron Los Chulos, Chulos, Chulos!" ("Los Chulos, Chulos, Chulos have arrived!"). The band has recorded over 30 studio albums throughout their existence and had various collaborations with high-profile regional acts such as Diana Reyes, Patrulla 81, Polo Urías y su Maquina Norteña, Banda Pachuco.

Los Caminantes continue to record and tour throughout the United States, Mexico and Central America. Frontman Agustín Ramírez died on October 26, 2022. His sons, Agustín Jr. and Anthony, continue on with the band.

A tribute concert in honor of Agustín Ramírez marking the one-year anniversary of his death was held on October 27, 2023 in San Bernardino County, CA. The event featured artists performances, guest speakers, a charity fundraiser for the American Cancer Society, and was hosted by popular radio personality Alex "El Genio" Lucas.

The sons continue to honor their late father by re-recording a song originally composed by Agustín called, "Cómo Te Extraño, Papá" ("How I Miss You, Dad"), released on Father's Day of 2024.

On October 13, 2025, Los Caminantes were a recipient of an Micrófono de Oro award in Las Vegas, Nevada. An award that recognizes the trajectory and talent of outstanding people in the fields of culture, cinema, voiceover and art. In a speech given at the ceremony, the sons, Agustín Jr. and Anthony, dedicated the award solely to their late father.

== Discography ==
=== Albums ===
- 1983: Supe Perder
- 1983: Especialmente Para Usted
- 1983: Numero Tres
- 1984: Corridos Al Estilo De Los Caminantes
- 1984: Porque Tengo Tu Amor
- 1985: Cada Día Mejor
- 1986: De Guanajuato...Para America!
- 1987: Gracias Martín
- 1988: Los Idolos Del Pueblo
- 1988: Incontenibles Romanticos
- 1989: No Cantan Mal Las Rancheras
- 1990: Enamorados
- 1990: Tropicalísimos
- 1991: Dos Cartas y Una Flor
- 1992: Recuerdos
- 1993: Buenos Vaqueros
- 1994: En Vivo
- 1994: A Todisima...Banda
- 1994: Lagrimas Al Recordar
- 1995: Por Ese Amor
- 1996: Con Mariachi
- 1996: Corridos Bravos
- 1997: Con Tinta Del Corazon
- 1998: Baraja Adicta
- 1999: Con Canciones
- 1999: Rumbo Al Sur
- 2000: Cielo
- 2000: Sueño Contigo
- 2001: De Pueblo En Pueblo
- 2002: Cuando Quiere Un Mexicano
- 2003: Con Banda Sinaloense
- 2007: Aunque Mal Paguen Ellas
- 2008: Celebrando Nuestro 25 Aniversario
- 2009: En Vivo! Desde Tijuana, San Diego y Mexicali
- 2013: Los Chulos, Chulos, Chulos

=== Compilations ===
- 1983: 15 Exitos, Vol. 1
- 1985: 15 Exitos, Vol. 2
- 1986: Cumbias Al Estilo De Los Caminantes
- 1987: 15 Exitos, Vol. 3
- 1993: 10 Años
- 1993: 21 Exitos, Vol. 1
- 1996: Cumbiando Con Los Chulos, Chulos, Chulos
- 1997: 15 Aniversario
- 1999: 21 Exitos, Vol. 2
- 1999: 20th Anniversary
- 2000: Para Recordar
- 2001: Nuestras Canciones Romanticas Favoritas: 20 Exitazos
- 2002: Nuestras Canciones Rancheras Favoritas: 20 Exitazos
- 2002: Colección de Oro
- 2002: 20 Corridazos
- 2002: 20 Cumbias Sin Parar
- 2003: Mis 30 Mejores Canciones
- 2004: Tesoros de Colección: Puras Rancheras
- 2005: Tesoros de Colección: Lo Romantico de Los Caminantes
- 2007: La Historia: Lo Mas Chulo, Chulo, Chulo
- 2008: Caminantes Si Hay Caminos: Sus Rancheras Mas Chula
- 2009: En Vivo! Desde Tijuana, San Diego y Mexicali
- 2009: Moviditas y Cumbias Bien Chulas
- 2010: Tesoros de Colección
- 2010: Mis Favoritas
- 2011: La Historia de Los Exitos
- 2013: Iconos: 25 Exitos
- 2014: 15 Kilates Musicales

=== Singles ===
- 1980: "Dos Flores, Dos Amores" / "Cuando Dos Almas" released on Discos Olympico Records as Los Caminantes Aztecas
- 2024: "Cómo Te Extraño, Papá"
- 2024: "De Nueva Cuenta"
- 2025: "Isabel"
- 2026: "Llegastes"

=== Promotional singles ===
- 2024: Nuevas Canciones - "Cómo Te Extraño, Papá" / "De Nueva Cuenta"
- 2026: Nuevas Canciones No. 2 - "Isabel" / "Llegastes"

=== Music DVD ===
- 2007: La Historia: Lo Mas Chulo, Chulo, Chulo
- 2008: Caminantes Si Hay Caminos: Sus Rancheras Mas Chula
- 2009: En Vivo! Desde Tijuana, San Diego y Mexicali
- 2009: Moviditas y Cumbias Bien Chulas

== Music videos ==
- 1985: "Ven y Abrázame"
- 1987: "Todo Me Gusta De Ti"
- 1991: "Dos Cartas y Una Flor"
- 1992: "Sin Un Adiós"
- 1994: "Lágrimas Al Recordar"
- 1996: "Jaula Dorada"
- 1997: "Chiquilla"
- 1998: "Baraja Adicta"
- 2014: "Tus Mentiras"
- 2015: "Celoso"
- 2019: "Un Año Más Sin Ti"
- 2023: "Una Noche Más Sin Ti"
- 2024: "Cómo Te Extraño, Papá"
- 2025: "Isabel"
- 2026: "Llegastes"

== Filmography ==
- 1990: Caminantes...Si Hay Caminos
