= Elifas Andreato =

Brazilian graphic designer

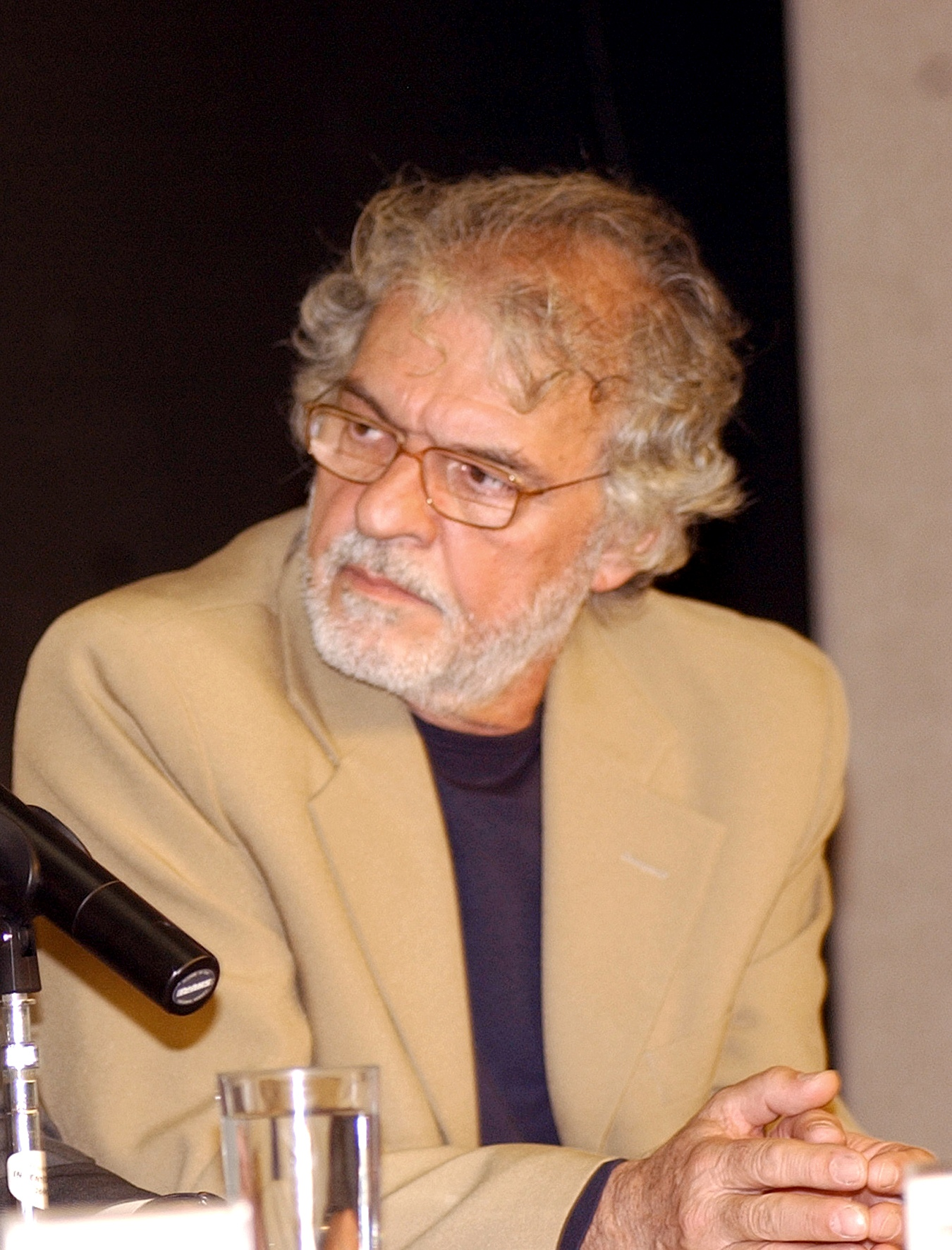
- Born: 22 January 1946; Rolândia
- Died: 29 March 2022; São Paulo
- Occupation: Graphic artist
- Relatives: Elias Vicente Andreato

Elifas Vicente Andreato (22 January 1946 – 29 March 2022) was a Brazilian graphic designer and illustrator. With a career spanning forty years, Andreato was especially recognized as the cover artist of more than 300 albums by Brazilian musicians, including names such as Chico Buarque de Holanda, Elis Regina, Adoniran Barbosa, Paulinho da Viola, Martinho da Vila, Toquinho and Vinícius de Moraes. He also did posters and set design for stage plays.

His brother is the actor Elias Andreato.

== Life ==
Elifas Andreato was born in Rolândia, in the state of Paraná to rural working parents. He had to work early in life to support his parents and five siblings. He moved to São Paulo, where, at the age of 14, he worked in a factory as an apprentice and attending an adult literacy course at night. There he began his stint as a designer, drawing cartoons at the workers' newspaper.

In 1967, he began working as an intern at Editora Abril, collaborating for several magazines, eventually getting to be director of Abril Cultural, the publisher's educational division. Andreato left the publisher during the 1970s, having been involved in the opposition to the military dictatorship, and worked to several alternative newspapers, such as Opinião and Argumento. He was persecuted and imprisoned by the military for his illustrations criticizing the regime.

== Album covers ==
Andreato illustrated 362 album covers for several Brazilian musicians, starting in 1973, with Nervos de Aço, by Paulinho da Viola. Among the albums illustrated by him are: Chico Buarque's Ópera do Malandro (1979), Vida (1980) and Almanaque (1982); Clementina de Jesus's Clementina (1979), Toquinho & Vinícius de Moraes' A Arca de Noé (1980); Clara Nunes's Nação (1982), Adoniran Barbosa's self-titled album (1980), Elis Regina's Luz das Estrelas and Elis Vive (1984), Martinho da Vila's Batuque na cozinha (1972), Canta Canta, Minha Gente (1974) ,Rosa do Povo (1976) and Bandeira da Fé (2018), and Criolo's Espiral de Ilusão” (2017).
