= Agustín Ramírez (singer) =

Mexican singer-songwriter (1952–2022)

- Born: August 28, 1952; San Francisco del Rincón, Guanajuato, Mexico
- Died: October 26, 2022 (aged 70) San Bernardino County, California, United States
- Genres: Regional Mexican
- Occupations: Singer; songwriter
- Instruments: Vocals; cabasa
- Years active: 1976–2022
- Labels: Discos Olympico Records, Luna Records, Fonovisa Records, Sony Music
- Formerly of: Los Caminantes
- Website: loscaminantesmusica.com

Agustín Ramírez Sánchez (August 28, 1952 – October 26, 2022) was a Mexican singer-songwriter, co-founder and frontman of the grupera band Los Caminantes.

Ramírez composed and was responsible for many of Los Caminantes' hits, including, "Palomita Mensajera," "Para Que Quieres Volver," "Regresaré," "He Sabido," "Volar, Volar," "Ven y Abrázame," "Una Noche," "Todo Me Gusta De Ti," "Mi Niña," "Lágrimas Al Recordar," etc.

Ramírez also composed songs for groups such as El Tiempo, Los Sagitarios, El Jefe y Su Grupo, and in 1990, composed a ballad for the tropical group Los João called, "Una Noche Más Sin Ti."

In 1993, Agustín Ramírez received an honorary plaque award which was placed outside a wall of his hometown of San Pancho by the mayor. The mayor of that time wanted to honor Agustín for his achievements, recognition and pride of San Pancho, Mexico, and Latin America.

In 2016, Agustín gave vocals for "Para Que Quieres Volver" on a recorded track to La Rondalla Tradicional de Saltillo in an album titled, La Razón de Mi Existir.

== Childhood and early life ==
Born in San Francisco del Rincón, Guanajuato, Mexico, Agustín attended the seminary "Misioneros de María Niña" (an all-boys Catholic prep school), where he sang in the choir along with his brother and fellow Los Caminantes member Brígido Ramírez. He was also an avid soccer fan, having played the sport throughout his childhood at the school with his eldest brother Bernardo Ramírez and childhood friend/future priest Father Mario Francisco Cabrera.

== Death ==
After a short-term battle with liver cancer, Agustín Ramírez died on October 26, 2022, at the age of 70. His sons, Agustín Jr. and Anthony Ramírez, continue on with the legacy.

== Legacy ==
A tribute concert in honor of Agustín Ramírez marking the one-year anniversary of his passing was held on October 27, 2023 in San Bernardino County, CA. The event featured artists performances by Rocio "La Dama De La Cumbia", Grupo La Migra and more, guest speakers, a charity fundraiser for the American Cancer Society, and was hosted by popular radio personality Alex "El Genio" Lucas.

In 2023, the remaining members of Los Caminantes dedicated a music video "Una Noche Más Sin Ti" in memory of Agustín. It features the members of the band performing on a auditorium stage and, in the center, a microphone/microphone stand with a rosary hanging on the microphone.

His sons, Agustín Jr. and Anthony, continue to honor their late father by re-recording a song originally composed by Agustín called, "Cómo Te Extraño, Papá" ("How I Miss You, Dad"), released on Father's Day of 2024.

On December 6, 2024, Agustín was a recipient of an Micrófono de Oro award in Mexico City. An award that recognizes the trajectory and talent of outstanding people in the fields of culture, cinema, voiceover and art.
