= United States in the OTI Festival 1988 =

- OTI Festival 1988
- Participating broadcaster: Univision
- Country: United States
- Selection process: XI Festival Nacional de la Canción OTI–Univision
- Selection date: 28 September 1988

Competing entry
- Song: "Así somos, así soy"
- Artist: Miguel Ángel Mejía
- Songwriters: América Vázquez; Miguel Ángel Mejía

Placement
- Final result: 14th, 0 points

Participation chronology
◄1987 •	1988	• 1989►

The United States was represented at the OTI Festival 1988 with the song "Así somos, así soy", written by América Vázquez and Miguel Ángel Mejía, and performed by Mejía himself. The participating broadcaster representing the country, Univision, selected its entry through a national televised competition. The song, that was performed in position 8, placed fourteenth and last out of 22 competing entries, tied with eight other songs with 0 points.

== National stage ==
Univision held a national televised competition to select its entry for the 17th edition of the OTI Festival. This was the eleventh edition of the Festival Nacional de la Canción OTI–Univision. In the final, each song represented a Univision affiliate, each of which had selected its entry through a local pre-selection.

=== Central California pre-selection ===
On Saturday 18 June 1988, KFTV held a televised pre-selection at the Warnors Theatre in Fresno, beginning at 20:00 PDT (03:00+1 UTC). This eleventh edition of the Central California Local OTI Festival featured ten songs. It was presented by Pedro Santos and Prisma, and broadcast on Channel 21 on Sunday 26 June, beginning at 19:00 PDT (02:00+1 UTC).

Songwriters competing included Víctor González, Christina Cardona, Francisco Resendiz Lemos, A. Fernando Figueroa, Coco González, Juan Carlos Urbina, Ramón Vecina, Javier Ramírez Jr., and Raúl Gonzalez. The songs not performed by their songwriter were performed by Dora Luz Orozco, Miguel Hernández, Helen Vecina, Cynthia González, Juan Ángel Salinas, José Matos, Salvador Arteaga, and Viola Rendón.

The winner, and therefore qualified for the national final, was "Aprende a amar", written by Ramón Vecina and Gary Kennedy and performed by Ramón Vecina and Helen Vecina.

Qualifier

Result of the Local OTI Festival – Central California 1988 (Note: Incomplete list of the competing entries.)
R/O	Song	Artist	Songwriter(s)	Result
	"Aprende a amar"	Ramón Vecina and Helen Vecina	Ramón Vecina; Gary Kennedy	Qualified

=== Los Angeles pre-selection ===
On Wednesday 17 August 1988, KMEX-TV held a televised pre-selection at The Hollywood Palace in Los Angeles. This tenth edition of the Los Angeles Local OTI Festival featured ten songs, selected from the 350 received. The show featured guest performances by Armando Manzanero, María Medina, Postdata, Julio Sabala, and the Dolores Terry ballet. It was broadcast on Channel 34 on Sunday 28 August, beginning at 19:00 PDT (02:00+1 UTC).

The jury was composed of Lucho Gatica, Isela Sotelo, Franco, Rudy Regalado, and Alberto Quezada.

The winner, and therefore qualified for the national final, was "La verdad", written and performed by Juan Miguel Enríquez Soto; with "No estoy herido", written and performed by Miguel Enrique (Michael Henry Gaytán), placing second; and "Estoy amando", written and performed by Ana Linda (Linda Arriola), placing third. The festival ended with a reprise of the winning entry.

Result of the Local OTI Festival – Los Angeles 1988
R/O	Song	Artist	Songwriter(s)	Result
	"Quién te quiere más"		Orlando Castro; Toti Fuentes	—N/a
	"Caprichosa e insaciable"	Janelly	Javier "El Gato Santos"	—N/a
	"Unidos por amor"	Juan Loren Zerimar	Juan Loren Zerimar	—N/a
	"Estoy amando"	Ana Linda	Linda Arriola	3
	"Te creí olvidado"	Sara Triana	Daniel Indart	—N/a
	"Cuchillito de palo"	Pedro Sergio Perea	Mario Humberto Álvarez	—N/a
	"Todo en nada"		Luis Durán	—N/a
	"Me acordé de ti"		José Rubén Landaverde "Randú"	—N/a
	"No estoy herido"	Miguel Enrique	Michael Henry Gaytán	2
	"La verdad"	Juan Miguel	Juan Miguel Enríquez Soto	Qualified

=== El Paso pre-selection ===
On Saturday 27 August 1988, KINT-TV held a televised pre-selection at the El Paso Convention and Performing Arts Center in El Paso, beginning at 19:00 CDT (00:00+1 UTC). This fourth edition of the El Paso Local OTI Festival featured ten songs, selected from the 47 received. It was broadcast on Channel 26 on Saturday 3 September, beginning at 21:00 CDT (02:00+1 UTC). The show featured a guest performance by Carlos Lico.

The jury was composed of Tino Contreras, Beto Valtierra, Rafael Mendoza, Verónica Sosa-Nájera, and Malena Cano.

The winner, and therefore qualified for the national final, was "Alegría", written by Juan Solares and performed by Samuel Delgado.

Result of the Local OTI Festival – El Paso 1988
R/O	Song	Artist	Songwriter(s)	Result
	"Alegría"	Samuel Delgado	Juan Solares	Qualified
	"Amo a los dos igual"	César Alejandro	César Alejandro	
	"Amor en silencio"	Ki Eugene	Ki Eugene	
	"Dos bocas"	Nelly Fierro	Ben Adame Novella	
	"Eslabón de amor"	Daniel Olaizola	Rudy Torres	
	"La vida es así"	Otilia Chávez	Salvador Chávez	
	"Mi luz"	Patty Duncan	Luis Hernández	
	"Siempre es tiempo para dar nuestro amor"	Dora Reyes	Mario Betancourt	
	"Simplemente te quiero"	Sol Noriega	Sol Noriega	
	"Tan solo jamás"	Leonardo A. Cárdenas	Leonardo A. Cárdenas	

=== Tampa pre-selection ===
On Thursday 1 September 1988, WBHS held a televised pre-selection in Miami. This was the fifth edition of the Tampa Local OTI Festival. It was broadcast on Channel 61.

The winner, and therefore qualified for the national final, was "Dale gracias al amor", written by Dinorah Rivas, and performed by Esther María Tellado.

Result of the Local OTI Festival – Tampa 1988
R/O	Song	Artist	Songwriter(s)	Result
	"Dale gracias al amor"	Esther María Tellado	Dinorah Rivas	Qualified

=== Miami pre-selection ===
WLTV held a televised pre-selection in Miami. It was broadcast on Channel 23.

The winner, and therefore qualified for the national final, was "Así somos, así soy", written by América Vázquez and Miguel Ángel Mejía, and performed by Mejía himself.

Result of the Local OTI Festival – Miami 1988
R/O	Song	Artist	Songwriter(s)	Result
	"Así somos, así soy"	Miguel Ángel Mejía	América Vázquez; Miguel Ángel Mejía	Qualified

=== Washington D.C. pre-selection ===
W14AA held a televised pre-selection in Washington D.C., and broadcast on Channel 14.

The winner, and therefore qualified for the national final, was "Tiempo de sembrar", written and performed by María Isolina.

Result of the Local OTI Festival – Washington D.C. 1988
R/O	Song	Artist	Songwriter(s)	Result
	"Tiempo de sembrar"	María Isolina	María Isolina	Qualified

=== Houston pre-selection ===
KXLN-TV held a televised pre-selection in Houston. This was the first edition of the Houston Local OTI Festival. It was broadcast on Channel 45.

The winner, and therefore qualified for the national final, was "Homenaje", written by Víctor Manuel Moreno and performed by José Humberto Marín.

Result of the Local OTI Festival – Houston 1988
R/O	Song	Artist	Songwriter(s)	Result
	"Homenaje"	José Humberto Marín	Víctor Manuel Moreno	Qualified

=== San Francisco pre-selection ===
KDTV held an internal pre-selection. The station filmed a preview video for each of the shortlisted songs, with the singers lip-syncing to the studio version of the songs. The songs, the preview videos, and which had received the most votes, were revealed in a special program, broadcast on Channel 14.

The winner, and therefore qualified for the national final, was "Ojos brujos", written by Cyarmine Benítez and performed by Ana Deisi.

Result of the Local OTI pre-selection – San Francisco 1988
R/O	Song	Artist	Songwriter(s)	Result
7	"Yo sé mi verdad"	Alberto Cardielli	Alberto Cardielli	
	"Ojos brujos"	Ana Deisi	Cyarmine Benítez	Qualified

=== Final ===
The final was held on Wednesday 28 September 1988 at the Fontainebleau Hilton Hotel in Miami Beach, featuring thirteen songs. It was presented by Lucy Pereda and Antonio Vodanovic, and broadcast live on all Univision affiliates. The show featured guest performances by Willy Chirino, Paloma San Basilio, Julio Sabala, Ángela Carrasco, and Manuel Mijares.

The jury was composed of: Luca Bentivoglio, Paul Rodríguez, Lupita Ferrer, Lissette, Jorge Martínez, Lucerito, Arnaldo André, Fernando Carrillo, Gigi Zanchetta, Gabriel Traversari, Manuel Mijares, Ángela Carrasco, Julio Sabala, Braulio, Cristina Saralegui, Rudy Pérez, and Don Francisco as chairperson.

The winner was "Así somos, así soy" representing WLTV–Miami, written by América Vázquez and Miguel Ángel Mejía, and performed by Mejía himself; with "Culpable yo" representing WSNS-TV–Chicago, written by Juan Carlos Felipe and performed by Roberto Sánchez, placing second; and "Tiempo de sembrar" representing W14AA–Washington D.C., written and performed by María Isolina, placing third. In addition, Miguel Ángel Mejía received the Best Performer Award, and Héctor Garrido received the Best Musical Arrangement Award for "Culpable yo".

Winner

Result of the final of the XI Festival Nacional de la Canción OTI–Univision
R/O	Song	Artist	Songwriter(s)	Affiliate	Result
2	"La verdad"	Juan Miguel	Juan Miguel Enríquez Soto	KMEX-TV–Los Angeles	—N/a
	"Así somos, así soy"	Miguel Ángel Mejía	América Vázquez; Miguel Ángel Mejía	WLTV–Miami	1
	"Culpable yo"	Roberto Sánchez	Juan Carlos Felipe	WSNS-TV–Chicago	2
	"Dale gracias al amor"	Esther María Tellado	Dinorah Rivas	WBHS–Tampa	—N/a
	"Tiempo de sembrar"	María Isolina	María Isolina	W14AA–Washington D.C.	3
	"Aprende a amar"	Ramón Vecina and Helen Vecina	Ramón Vecina; Gary Kennedy	KFTV–Fresno	—N/a
	"Alegría"	Samuel Delgado	Juan Solares	KINT-TV–El Paso	—N/a
	"Homenaje"	José Humberto Marín	Víctor Manuel Moreno	KXLN-TV–Houston	—N/a
	"Ojos brujos"	Ana Deisi	Cyarmine Benítez	KDTV–San Francisco	—N/a
	"Camino viejo"	Jaime Jacobo Torres	Jaime Jacobo Torres	WXTV–New York	—N/a
	"Historia sin final"	Jorge Montana	Jorge Montana	KTVW-TV–Phoenix	—N/a
	"Nací para cantar"	Laura Canales	Efraín Sánchez	KWEX-TV–San Antonio	—N/a
	"Mi voz y mi guitarra"	Gustavo López	Gustavo López	W66BV–Detroit	—N/a

== At the OTI Festival ==
On 19 November 1988, the OTI Festival was held at the Teatro Nacional Cervantes in Buenos Aires, Argentina, hosted by Argentina Televisora Color (ATC), and broadcast live throughout Ibero-America. Miguel Ángel Mejía performed "Así somos, así soy" in position 8, with Rodolfo Martínez conducting the event's orchestra, and placing fourteenth and last out of 22 competing entries, with 0 points tied with the songs from Bolivia, Ecuador, El Salvador, Honduras, the Netherlands Antilles, Panama, Puerto Rico, and Venezuela.
