= United States in the OTI Festival 1986 =

- OTI Festival 1986
- Participating broadcaster: Spanish International Network (SIN)
- Country: United States
- Selection process: IX Festival Nacional de la Canción SIN – Camino a la OTI
- Selection date: 17 October 1986

Competing entry
- Song: "Todos"
- Artist: Dámaris Carbaugh, Miguel Ángel Guerra, and Eduardo Fabián
- Songwriter: Vilma Planas

Placement
- Final result: 1st

Participation chronology
◄1985 •	1986	• 1987►

The United States was represented at the OTI Festival 1986 with the song "Todos", written by Vilma Planas, and performed by Dámaris Carbaugh, Miguel Ángel Guerra, and Eduardo Fabián. The participating broadcaster representing the country, the Spanish International Network (SIN), selected its entry through a national televised competition. The song, that was performed in position 18, placed first out of 20 competing entries, winning the festival. This was the first entry from the United States to win the OTI Festival.

== National stage ==
The Spanish International Network (SIN) held a national televised competition to select its entry for the 15th edition of the OTI Festival. This was the ninth edition of the Festival Nacional de la Canción SIN – Camino a la OTI. In the final, each song represented a SIN affiliate, each of which had selected its entry through a local pre-selection.

Jorge Baglietto, who placed third in the New York pre-selection as part of Dúo Fronteras, and Vilma Planas who wrote the winning song, had already represented the United States in 1983 as singer and songwriter respectively; with Planas also representing the United States in 1981.

=== San Antonio pre-selection ===
On Thursday 31 July 1986, KWEX-TV held a televised pre-selection at the Lila Cockrell Theatre in San Antonio, beginning at 20:00 CDT (01:00+1 UTC). This ninth edition of the San Antonio Local OTI Festival featured ten songs. It was broadcast on Channel 41 on Saturday 23 August, beginning at 19:00 CDT (00:00+1 UTC). The show featured guest performances by Lorenza Lory, Frank Moro, Liza King, Laura Canales, Noé Pro, and Los Paranás.

The jury was composed of Ramón Hernández, Nino Palacios, Lorenza Lory, Lee Garza, Xavier Garza, Felipe Cantu, Laura Canales, Sam Zúñiga, Joe Hernández, Sonny Melendrez, and Pedro Majul.

The winner, and therefore qualified for the national final, was "Por ella", written by Pedro Reyna and performed by Sergio Ruiz; with "Quiero ser", written and performed by Francisco F. Monroy, placing second; and "El amor, el amor", written by Miguel Nacel and performed by Zenaida Alvarado, and "Nuestra decisión", written and performed by Javier Molina, both placing third. In addition, Sergio Ruiz received the Best Performer Award.

Qualifier

Result of the Local OTI Festival – San Antonio 1986
R/O	Song	Artist	Songwriter(s)	Result
1	"El amor, el amor"	Zenaida Alvarado	Miguel Nacel	3
2	"Porque te extraño"	José Salvador	Salvador Macías	—N/a
3	"Un amor de nuestro amor"	Humberto and Beatriz	Humberto Ramón	—N/a
4	"Maritza"	David González	Jesús González	—N/a
5	"Canto amigo"	Juan Manuel	Juan Manuel Delgado	—N/a
6	"Adelante y triunfarás"	Cristobal Lucatero	Cristobal Lucatero	—N/a
7	"Nuestra decisión"	Javier Molina	Javier Molina	3
8	"Por ella"	Sergio Ruiz	Pedro Reyna	Qualified
9	"Imagínate"	Karina Monreal	Karina Monreal	—N/a
10	"Quiero ser"	Francisco F. Monroy	Francisco F. Monroy	2

=== Los Angeles pre-selection ===
On Thursday 18 September 1986, KMEX-TV held a televised pre-selection at the Good Time Theater of the Knott's Berry Farm in Buena Park, beginning at 19:00 PDT (02:00+1 UTC). This eight edition of the Los Angeles Local OTI Festival featured eight songs, shortlisted from over 400 received. It was presented by María Sorté and Eduardo Quezada; and was broadcast on Channel 34 on Sunday 21 September, beginning at 20:30 PDT (03:30+1 UTC). The musical director was Héctor Garrido, who conducted the orquestra. The show featured guest performances by Sorté, Manolo Muñoz, and Rudy La Scala.

The president of the jury only decided in the event of a tie, the rest of the four jurors scored each song between 1 and 5 points.

The winner, and therefore qualified for the national final, was "Soñador", written by Enrique Izquieta and performed by Bobby Rivas; with "Es tu vida", written by Mario Humberto Álvarez and performed by Pedro Sergio Perea, placing second; and "Aeropuerto", written and performed by Verónica Meneses, placing third. The festival ended with a reprise of the winning entry.

Result of the Local OTI Festival – Los Angeles 1986
R/O	Song	Artist	Songwriter(s)	Points	Result
	"Soñador"	Bobby Rivas	Enrique Izquieta	20	Qualified
	"El amor"	Juan Guillermo Aguirre	José Santiago Irarrazábal	—N/a	
	"Los rieles de la vida"	Moisés Contreras	Moisés Contreras	—N/a	
	"Veinte años después"	Tina María Salinas	Luis Gómez Beck	—N/a	
	"Es tu vida"	Pedro Sergio Perea	Mario Humberto Álvarez		2
	"Fallaste corazón"	José Guadalupe Castillo	José Guadalupe Castillo	—N/a	
	"Aeropuerto"	Verónica Meneses	Verónica Meneses		3
	"Escena de amor No.1"	Ruby Valdés and Heberto Guillén	Heberto Guillén	—N/a	

=== El Paso pre-selection ===
On Saturday 4 October 1986, KINT-TV held a televised pre-selection at the El Paso Civic Center in El Paso. This second edition of the El Paso Local OTI Festival featured ten songs. It was presented by Verónica Sosa Saracho and Armando de la Fuente, and was broadcast live on Channel 26. The musical director was Jonathán Zarzosa, who conducted the University of Texas at El Paso Symphony Orchestra. The show featured guest performances by Daniela Romo, the band Azúcar, and the ballet Viva El Paso.

The jury was composed of Malena Cano, Hugh F. Carden, Clarence C. Cooper, Lázaro Ferrari, Lucy Scarbrough, Ernesto Valenzuela, and Abraham Chávez as chairperson. The president of the jury only decided in the event of a tie, the rest of the jurors secretly scored each song between 1 and 5 points right after their performance.

The winner, and therefore qualified for the national final, was "Ella y yo", written and performed by Gustavo Munguía; with "Canción al cantar", written by Magdalena García and performed by Cecilia Noel, placing second; and "Era que", written by Enrique Santiesteban and performed by Ramón Torresdey, placing third. The first-place trophy was delivered by Richard Nágera, the second-place trophy by José Ángel Silva Jr., and the third-place trophy by Mary Ponce. The festival ended with a reprise of the winning entry.

Result of the Local OTI Festival – El Paso 1986
R/O	Song	Artist	Songwriter(s)	Result
1	"Era que"	Ramón Torresdey	Enrique Santiesteban	3
2	"No dejes que termine este amor"	Tere Ramos	Arturo Garibay	—N/a
3	"Lo que tú quieras amor"	José Turon	Tony Solo	—N/a
4	"Por amor manda amor"	Gerardo Carlos and Lety Portillo	Gerardo Carlos	—N/a
5	"Mi amor y tu amistad"	Dora Elia	Soledad Noriega	—N/a
6	"Ella y yo"	Gustavo Munguía	Gustavo Munguía	Qualified
7	"Canción al cantar"	Cecilia Noel	Magdalena García	2
8	"No cambies"	Luis Hernández	Luis Hernández	—N/a
9	"¿Qué es lo que me hace vivir?"	Cecilia Macías	Astrid Lyons	—N/a
10	"Entra el señor compositor"	Christian Lyons	Christian Lyons	—N/a

=== New York pre-selection ===
WXTV held an internal pre-selection for the states of New York, New Jersey, Pennsylvania, and Connecticut. On 16 August 1986, a jury composed of Carlos Guillermo D'Atolli, Ilia Martínez, Vivian Di Angelo, Iván Gutiérrez, Thelma Ithier, and Pedro de Córdoba as chairperson, listened at the station's headquarters to the 100 songs received on cassette. The president of the jury only decided in the event of a tie for qualification, the rest of the jurors scored each song between 1 and 5 points. The ten highest-scoring songs advanced to the next round.

On 27 August, a jury composed of Enrique Fernández, Puli Toro, Vicky Ana, Romeo Caicedo, Jorge Durán, and Osvaldo Oñoz as chairperson, listened the ten shortlisted songs on cassette. Again, the president of the jury only decided in the event of a tie, and the rest of the jurors scored each of the songs between 1 and 5 points.

The station filmed a preview video for each of the ten shortlisted songs, with the singers lip-syncing to the studio version of the songs. The ten songs, the preview videos, the selection process, and which three had received the most votes, were revealed in a special program, narrated by Bobby Franco, broadcast on Channel 41.

The winner, and therefore qualified for the national final, was "Todos", written by Vilma Planas and performed by Dámaris Carbaugh, Miguel Ángel Guerra, and Eduardo Fabián; with "Rey de piedra y de madera", written by Jay Santana and performed by Isabel Rodríguez, placing second; and "América ven a mí", written by Víctor Arturo Barrientos and performed by Dúo Fronteras (Jorge Baglietto and Víctor Arturo Barrientos), placing third.

Result of the Local OTI pre-selection – New York 1986
R/O	Song	Artist	Songwriter(s)	Points	Result
1	"Rey de piedra y de madera"	Isabel Rodríguez	Jay Santana	16	2
2	"América ven a mí"	Dúo Fronteras (Jorge Baglietto and Víctor Arturo Barrientos)	Víctor Arturo Barrientos	14	3
3	"Una canción de amor"	Juan Gualberto Valentín	Juan Gualberto Valentín	—N/a	
4	"Todos"	Dámaris Carbaugh, Miguel Ángel Guerra, and Eduardo Fabián	Vilma Planas	18	Qualified
5	"América es una sola"	Fuad Safatle	Rosario Melgar	—N/a	
6	"El velo de tu piel"	Dúo Imagen (Pedro Abreu and José Martínez)	Pedro Abreu; José Martínez	—N/a	
7	"De amantes a extraños"	Stella Balandrán	Stella Balandrán	—N/a	
8	"A ver, a ver"	Dúo Cantamérica (Silvia Sánchez and Enrique Sánchez)	Enrique A. Sánchez	—N/a	
9	"Orgullo latino"	Jorge Morad	Jorge Morad	—N/a	
10	"Qué no he sido yo en tu vida"	Fredi Dionisio Núñez	Fredi Dionisio Núñez	—N/a	

=== Final ===
The final was held on Friday 17 October 1986 at the Miami Convention Center in Miami featuring eleven songs. It was presented by Lucy Pereda and Raúl Velasco, and broadcast live on all SIN affiliates. The musical director was William Sánchez, who conducted the orchestra when required. The show featured guest performances by Miami Sound Machine, Yolandita Monge, and José Luis Perales. The draw to determine the running order (R/O) was held previously at the Miami Seaquarium, where the aquarium dolphins drew the balls with the positions.

The jury, that was present in the hall, was composed of one representative from each of the competing affiliates: Gerardo Pallares (KMEX-TV–Los Angeles), Gastón Rosenstrauch (W14AA–Washington D.C.), Jorge Belón (KDTV–San Francisco), Carmen Reccio (WXTV–New York), Andrés R. Morín (KWEX-TV–San Antonio), Ángeles Ferlita (W50AC–Tampa), Wayne Casas (WSNS-TV–Chicago), Alfredo Durán (WLTV–Miami), Alba Pérez de Ballesteros (KFTV–Fresno), Rosa María Boadella (KINT-TV–El Paso), and Rosa Elia Carrillo (KTVW-TV–Phoenix); who were joined by Frank Moro, Angélica María, Gonzalo Vega, Cecilia Villarreal, Jorge Martínez, Yolandita Monge, Arturo Peniche, Úrsula Prats, José Luis Perales, Grecia Colmenares, and Ernesto Alonso as chairperson. The representatives of the competing affiliates were not allowed to vote for their own entry.

The winner was "Todos" representing WXTV–New York, written by Vilma Planas, and performed by Dámaris Carbaugh, Miguel Ángel Guerra, and Eduardo Fabián; with "Es tiempo ya" representing WLTV–Miami, written by Zoila Pacheco and Jeannie Cruz and performed by Cruz herself, placing second; and "Para quererte a ti" representing KDTV–San Francisco, written by Eddie Portal and performed by Ana Deysi, placing third. The first-place trophies were delivered by José Luis Perales, the second-place trophies by Grecia Colmenares, and the third-place trophies by Angélica María. In addition, Dámaris Carbaugh, Miguel Ángel Guerra, and Eduardo Fabián received the Best Performer Award delivered by Gloria Estefan and Emilio Estefan. The festival ended with a reprise of the winning entry.

Winner

Result of the final of the IX Festival Nacional de la Canción SIN – Camino a la OTI
R/O	Song	Artist	Songwriter(s)	Conductor	Affiliate	Result
1	"Soñador"	Bobby Rivas	Enrique Izquieta	Héctor Garrido	KMEX-TV–Los Angeles	—N/a
2	"Desesperado"	Ricardo Díaz	Charly Menéndez	Juan Carlos Oyarzun	W14AA–Washington D.C.	—N/a
3	"Para quererte a ti"	Ana Deysi	Eddie Portal	William Sánchez	KDTV–San Francisco	3
4	"Todos"	Dámaris Carbaugh, Miguel Ángel Guerra, and Eduardo Fabián	Vilma Planas	Juan Salazar	WXTV–New York	1
5	"Solo por ella"	Sergio Ruiz	Pedro Reyna; Sergio Ruiz	Meco Monardo	KWEX-TV–San Antonio	—N/a
6	"No existe nada imposible"	Jerry Dean	Jerry Dean	William Sánchez	W50AC–Tampa	—N/a
7	"Por el amor"	Daniel Recalde	Daniel Recalde; Lázaro Muñiz; José Jorge	Lázaro Muñiz	WSNS-TV–Chicago	—N/a
8	"Es tiempo ya"	Jeannie Cruz	Zoila Pacheco; Jeannie Cruz	William Sánchez	WLTV–Miami	2
9	"Al sol"	Juan Alejandro	Juan Carlos Urbina	William Sánchez	KFTV–Fresno	—N/a
10	"Ella y yo"	Gustavo Munguía	Gustavo Munguía	Jimmy Olivas	KINT-TV–El Paso	—N/a
11	"Somos dos"	Adalberto Gallegos	Miguel Crisantes; Adalberto Gallegos	Peque Rosino	KTVW-TV–Phoenix	—N/a

== At the OTI Festival ==
On 15 November 1986, the OTI Festival was held at the Municipal Theatre in Santiago, Chile, hosted by Televisión Nacional de Chile (TVN), Universidad Católica de Chile Televisión (UCTV), and Universidad de Chile Televisión (UTV), and broadcast live throughout Ibero-America. Dámaris Carbaugh, Miguel Ángel Guerra, and Eduardo Fabián performed "Todos" in position 18, with Juan Salazar conducting the event's orchestra, and placing first out of 20 competing entries, winning the festival. This was the first entry from the United States to win the OTI Festival.
