= KFTV =

KFTV may refer to:

- KFTV-DT, a television station in Hanford, California
- KFTV.com, former name of Screen Global Production, a website for film, television, and commercial production industry
