= United States in the OTI Festival 1987 =

- OTI Festival 1987
- Participating broadcaster: Univision
- Country: United States
- Selection process: X Festival Nacional de la Canción SIN – Camino a la OTI
- Selection date: 29 August 1987

Competing entry
- Song: "Sabes lo que yo quisiera"
- Artist: Felo Bohr
- Songwriter: Mario Palacio

Placement
- Final result: Finalist

Participation chronology
| ◄1986 • | 1987 | • 1988► |

The United States was represented at the OTI Festival 1987 with the song "Sabes lo que yo quisiera", written by Mario Palacio, and performed by Felo Bohr. The participating broadcaster representing the country, Univision, selected its entry through a national televised competition. The song, that was performed in position 14, was not among the top-three places revealed.

== National stage ==
The Spanish International Network (SIN), which became Univision on 1 September 1987, held a national televised competition to select its entry for the 16th edition of the OTI Festival. This was the tenth edition of the Festival Nacional de la Canción SIN – Camino a la OTI. In the final, each song represented a SIN affiliate, each of which had selected its entry through a local pre-selection.

=== Tampa pre-selection ===
On Monday 10 August 1987, W50AC held a televised pre-selection. This was the fourth edition of the Tampa Local OTI Festival. It was broadcast on Channel 50.

=== Los Angeles pre-selection ===
On Friday 14 August 1987, KMEX-TV held a televised pre-selection at the Wilshire Ebell Theatre in Los Angeles. This ninth edition of the Los Angeles Local OTI Festival featured eight songs, shortlisted from the 200 received. It was presented by Laura Harring and Eduardo Quezada, and broadcast on Channel 34 and KLVE on Saturday 22 August, beginning at 19:00 PDT (02:00+1 UTC). The show featured guest performances by Prisma, Jorge Muñiz, and Chayanne.

The winner, and therefore qualified for the national final, was "Ella", written by Franco Maddlone and Marco Marinangeli, and performed by Marinangeli himself; with "Te quiero amar", written and performed by Viva Valdez, placing second; and "Sin ti", written and performed by Enrique Iglesias, placing third. In addition, Marinangeli received the Best Performer Award. The festival ended with a reprise of the winning entry.

Qualifier

Result of the Local OTI Festival – Los Angeles 1987
| R/O | Song | Artist | Songwriter(s) | Result |
|---|---|---|---|---|
| 1 | "No me importa" | Alfredo Bretón | Alfredo Bretón | —N/a |
| 2 | "Un inmenso amor" | Alinna | Christy Anna | —N/a |
| 3 | "Por la esencia de tu piel" | Cynthia Harding | Ciro Hurtado | —N/a |
| 4 | "Te quiero amar" | Viva Valdez | Viva Valdez | 2 |
| 5 | "Sin ti" | Enrique Iglesias | Enrique Iglesias | 3 |
| 6 | "Ella" | Marco Marinangeli | Franco Maddlone; Marco Marinangeli | Qualified |
| 7 | "El loco aquél" | David Solo | Anselmo Solís | —N/a |
| 8 | "Por favor amor" | Rebecca Olivo | Rebecca Olivo | —N/a |

=== Arizona pre-selection ===
KTVW-TV held a televised pre-selection. It was broadcast on Channel 33.

=== Final ===
The final was held on Saturday 29 August 1987 in Miami. It was presented by Lucy Pereda and Antonio Vodanovic, and broadcast live on all SIN affiliates. The winner was "Sabes lo que yo quisiera" representing WLTV–Miami, written by Mario Palacio and performed by Felo Bohr.

Winner

Result of the final of the X Festival Nacional de la Canción SIN – Camino a la OTI (Note: Incomplete list of the competing entries.)
| R/O | Song | Artist | Affiliate | Result |
|---|---|---|---|---|
| | "Sabes lo que yo quisiera" | Felo Bohr | WLTV–Miami | 1 |
| | "Ella" | Marco Marinangeli | KMEX-TV–Los Angeles | |
| | | | W50AC–Tampa | |
| | | | KTVW-TV–Phoenix | |

== At the OTI Festival ==
On 24 October 1987, the OTI Festival was held at Teatro São Luiz in Lisbon, Portugal, hosted by Radiotelevisão Portuguesa (RTP), and broadcast live throughout Ibero-America. Felo Bohr performed "Sabes lo que yo quisiera" in position 14, with Héctor Garrido conducting the event's orchestra. The song was not among the top-three places revealed.
