= United States in the OTI Festival 1990 =

- OTI Festival 1990
- Participating broadcaster: Univision
- Country: United States
- Selection process: XIII Festival Nacional de la Canción OTI–Univision
- Selection date: 12 September 1990

Competing entry
- Song: "Tu amor es mi adicción"
- Artist: Daniel Recalde
- Songwriter: Daniel Recalde

Placement
- Final result: Finalist

Participation chronology
| ◄1989 • | 1990 | • 1991► |

The United States was represented at the OTI Festival 1990 with the song "Tu amor es mi adicción", written and performed by Daniel Recalde. The participating broadcaster representing the country, Univision, selected its entry through a national televised competition. The song, that was performed in position 3, was not among the top-three places revealed. In addition, Univision was also the host broadcaster and staged the event at the Circus Maximus of the Caesars Palace in Las Vegas.

== National stage ==
Univision held a national televised competition to select its entry for the 19th edition of the OTI Festival. This was the thirteenth edition of the Festival Nacional de la Canción OTI–Univision. In the final, each song represented a Univision affiliate, each of which had selected its entry through a local pre-selection.

=== El Paso pre-selection ===
On Wednesday 8 August 1990, KINT-TV held a televised pre-selection at the El Paso Convention and Performing Arts Center in El Paso, beginning at 20:00 CDT (01:00+1 UTC). This sixth edition of the El Paso Local OTI Festival featured twelve songs. It was broadcast on Channel 26 on Saturday 25 August, beginning at 19:00 CDT (00:00+1 UTC).

The winner, and therefore qualified for the national final, was "Tiempo que pasó", written by Sergio Carmona, and performed by Pepe Turón.

Qualifier

Result of the Local OTI Festival – El Paso 1990
| R/O | Song | Artist | Songwriter(s) | Result |
|---|---|---|---|---|
| | "Hermanos" | Arturo Chávez | Arturo Chávez | |
| | "Canción de la propuesta" | Jesus Coria | Luis Maguregui | |
| | "Hoy te quiero mucho más" | Dimas Carmona | Dimas Carmona | |
| | "Tiempo que pasó" | Pepe Turón | Sergio Carmona | Qualified |
| | "No vas" | Gerarado Chacón | Gerarado Chacón | |
| | "Bomba de la paz" | Emma and Javier | Hector Carbajal | |
| | "Le mandaron rosas" | Tony Zúñiga | Gustavo Mungía | |
| | "Y que de amor" | Cecilia Noel | Alonso Brotón | |
| | "El mismo cielo azul" | Patsy Trujillo | Alfonso Vásquez | |
| | "Sueño contigo" | Gina Leyva | Luis Hernández | |
| | "Ya no quiero ser actriz" | Lidia | Jaime Hernández; Gina Leyva; Manuel Rendón | |
| | "Canción de amor" | Rosaura Núñez | Rosaura Núñez | |

=== Tampa pre-selection ===
On Saturday 11 August 1990, W61BL held a pre-selection at the theatre of the Centro Asturiano in Tampa, beginning at 20:00 EDT (00:00+1 UTC). This seventh edition of the Tampa Local OTI Festival featured ten songs. It was presented by Mauricio Zeilic, and featured a guest performance by Hansel.

The winner, and therefore qualified for the national final, was "Decirte que te quiero", written by Orlirio Godínez, and performed by Leonel Suárez.

Result of the Local OTI Festival – Tampa 1990
| R/O | Song | Artist | Songwriter(s) | Result |
|---|---|---|---|---|
| 1 | "Algo de ti" | Agustín Freire | Margarita Freire | |
| 2 | "Himno a la vida" | Marcos Di Tony | Marcos Di Tony; Pedro Leal | |
| 3 | "Amor, no te vayas" | Henry Guerra | Rosalba Charry; Henry Guerra | |
| 4 | "Traigo en mi voz" | Gloria Helena Montoya | Gloria Helena Montoya | |
| 5 | "Y tú me amabas" | Lucy Mar | Beatriz Vega; Lucy Mar | |
| 6 | "Alma de poeta" | Claudio Martell | Claudio Reyes | |
| 7 | "Marinero de agua dulce" | Carlos Montano | Carlos Montano | |
| 8 | "No es distante mi pesar" | Martín Elías Rivera | Martín Elías Rivera | |
| 9 | "Decirte que te quiero" | Leonel Suárez | Orlirio Godínez | Qualified |
| 10 | "No, no a la guerra" | Roy Soto | Roy Soto | |

=== Los Angeles pre-selection ===
On Saturday 25 August 1990, KMEX-TV held a televised pre-selection at the Orpheum Theatre in Los Angeles, beginning at 19:00 PDT (02:00+1 UTC). This twelfth edition of the Los Angeles Local OTI Festival featured eight songs, shorlisted from 266 received. It was presented by Laura Flores and Edgardo Gazcón, and broadcast live on Channel 34. The show featured guest performances by Braulio, Prisma, Laura Flores, and Ángel Ferreira.

The winner, and therefore qualified for the national final, was "Soy toda corazón", written by Miguel Gaytán, and performed by María Villalobos "Coco"; with "Eres", written by Richard Gómez and performed by Margarita Luna, placing second; and "Junto a ti", written and performed by Roberto Nieto, placing third.

Result of the Local OTI Festival – Los Angeles 1990
| R/O | Song | Artist | Songwriter(s) | Result |
|---|---|---|---|---|
| | "Soy toda corazón" | María Villalobos "Coco" | Miguel Gaytán | Qualified |
| | "Junto a ti" | Roberto Nieto | Roberto Nieto | 3 |
| | "Amar te brinda vida" | David y Gila | David Yakobian | —N/a |
| | "Embrujado" | Eddy Júnior | Eddy Júnior | —N/a |
| | "Eres" | Margarita Luna | Richard Gómez | 2 |
| | "A un granuja" | Jorge E. Ossa | Jorge E. Ossa | —N/a |
| | "Equilibrista sin edad" | Marcela Carranza | Marcela Carranza | —N/a |
| | "No me importa" | Juan Miguel | Juan Miguel; Roger Maya | —N/a |

=== Dallas–Fort Worth pre-selection ===
KUVN held a televised pre-selection in Garland. This second edition of the Dallas–Fort Worth Local OTI Festival featured ten songs. It was presented by Juan Ramón and Teresa, and broadcast on Channel 23.

The winner, and therefore qualified for the national final, was "Una canción diferente", written and performed by Chela Miján.

Result of the Local OTI Festival – Dallas–Fort Worth 1990 (Note: Incomplete list of the competing entries.)
| R/O | Song | Artist | Songwriter(s) | Result |
|---|---|---|---|---|
| 1 | "Cante cante" | José Aparicio | José Aparicio | |
| | "Una canción diferente" | Chela Miján | Chela Miján | Qualified |

=== Houston pre-selection ===
KXLN-TV held a televised pre-selection in Houston. This was the third edition of the Houston Local OTI Festival. It was broadcast on Channel 45.

The winner, and therefore qualified for the national final, was "Te esperaré", written and performed by Paul V. Martínez.

Result of the Local OTI Festival – Houston 1990
| R/O | Song | Artist | Songwriter(s) | Result |
|---|---|---|---|---|
| | "Nacido en América" | José Gerardo | José Gerardo | |
| | "Te esperaré" | Paul V. Martínez | Paul V. Martínez | Qualified |

=== Final ===
The final was held on Wednesday 12 September 1990 at the Gusman Center for the Performing Arts in Miami, beginning at 19:00 EDT (23:00 UTC), and featuring fourteen songs. It was presented by Antonio Vodanovic and Andrea Kutyas, and broadcast live on all Univision affiliates. It was also broadcast in Bolivia, Ecuador, Guatemala, Honduras, and Peru. The show featured guest performances by Juan Luis Guerra y 440, Azúcar Moreno, Willy Chirino, Lissette, Laureano Brizuela, Clouds, and Lucho Navarro.

The jury was composed of Jorge Luis Piloto, Kiara, Álvaro Torres, Lourdes Robles, Lila Deneken, Kiki García, Laureano Brizuela, Lissete, Willy Chirino, Juan Luis Guerra, and Roberto Livi as chairperson.

The winner was "Mi adicción" representing WCIU–Chicago, written and performed by Daniel Recalde; with "Forjando un solo pueblo" representing W48AW–Washington D.C., written and performed by Lilo González, placing second; and "Somos tres" representing KTVW-TV–Phoenix, written by Enrique Ternbach and performed by Victoria Dean, placing third. The festival ended with a reprise of the winning entry.

Winner

Result of the final of the XIII Festival Nacional de la Canción OTI–Univision
| R/O | Song | Artist | Affiliate | Result |
|---|---|---|---|---|
| 1 | "La vieja" | Luz Piedad López | WLTV–Miami | —N/a |
| 2 | "Decirte que te quiero" | Leonel Suárez | W61BL–Tampa | —N/a |
| 3 | "Tiempo que pasó" | Pepe Turón | KINT-TV–El Paso | —N/a |
| 4 | "Soy toda corazón" | María Villalobos "Coco" | KMEX-TV–Los Angeles | —N/a |
| 5 | "A veces duele el amor" | Daniel Antonio | KFTV–Fresno | —N/a |
| 6 | "Forjando un solo pueblo" | Lilo González | W48AW–Washington D.C. | 2 |
| 7 | "¡Basta ya!" | Eduardo López | KORO–Corpus Christi | —N/a |
| 8 | "Somos tres" | Victoria Dean | KTVW-TV–Phoenix | 3 |
| 9 | "Mi adicción" | Daniel Recalde | WCIU–Chicago | 1 |
| 10 | "Una canción diferente" | Chela Miján | KUVN–Dallas–Fort Worth | —N/a |
| 11 | "Sin límites" | Raúl Brindis | KDTV–San Francisco | —N/a |
| 12 | "Te esperaré" | Paul V. Martínez | KXLN-TV–Houston | —N/a |
| 13 | "El amor" | Sergio Ruiz | KWEX–San Antonio | —N/a |
| 14 | "Un puerto de paz" | Víctor Alcalde | WXTV–New York | —N/a |

Following the national final, the winning song's title "Mi adicción" was changed to "Tu amor es mi adicción" for the international competition.

== At the OTI Festival ==
On 1 December 1990, the OTI Festival was held at the Circus Maximus of the Caesars Palace in Las Vegas, hosted by Univision, and broadcast live throughout Ibero-America. Daniel Recalde performed "Tu amor es mi adicción" in position 3, with Héctor Garrido conducting the event's orchestra. The song was not among the top-three places revealed at the end.
