= 1969 in Portuguese television =

This is a list of Portuguese television related events from 1969.

== Events ==
- 24 February - Simone de Oliveira is selected to represent Portugal at the 1969 Eurovision Song Contest with her song "Desfolhada". She is selected to be the sixth Portuguese Eurovision entry during Festival da Canção held at Teatro São Luiz in Lisbon.

== Debuts ==
- 8 January - Conversa em Família (1969–1974)
- 8 April - Se Bem Me Lembro (1969–1975)
