= United States in the OTI Festival 1989 =

- OTI Festival 1989
- Participating broadcaster: Univision
- Country: United States
- Selection process: XII Festival Nacional de la Canción OTI–Univision
- Selection date: 28 September 1989

Competing entry
- Song: "Hazme sentir"
- Artist: Iris and Margie
- Songwriter: Margarita Andino

Placement
- Final result: Finalist

Participation chronology
◄1988 •	1989	• 1990►

The United States was represented at the OTI Festival 1989 with the song "Hazme sentir", written by Margarita Andino, and performed by Iris and Margie. The participating broadcaster representing the country, Univision, selected its entry through a national televised competition. The song, that was performed in position 17, was not among the top-three places revealed. In addition, Univision was also the host broadcaster and staged the event at the James L. Knight Center in Miami.

== National stage ==
Univision held a national televised competition to select its entry for the 18th edition of the OTI Festival. This was the twelfth edition of the Festival Nacional de la Canción OTI–Univision. In the final, each song represented a Univision affiliate, each of which had selected its entry through a local pre-selection.

Félix López, who qualified for the final by winning the Houston pre-selection, had already represented El Salvador in 1982 and 1974.

=== Central California pre-selection ===
On Saturday 5 August 1989, KFTV held a televised pre-selection at the Fresno Memorial Auditorium in Fresno, beginning at 20:00 PDT (03:00+1 UTC). This twelfth edition of the Central California Local OTI Festival featured ten songs. It was presented by Jorge Muñiz, and broadcast on Channel 21 on Sunday 13 August, beginning at 19:30 PDT (02:30+1 UTC).

The winner, and therefore qualified for the national final, was "Nunca me olvidarás", performed by Rodrigo González.

Qualifier

Result of the Local OTI Festival – Central California 1989 (Note: Incomplete list of the competing entries.)
R/O	Song	Artist	Songwriter(s)	Result
	"Nunca me olvidarás"	Rodrigo González		Qualified

=== Tampa pre-selection ===
On Sunday 6 August 1989, WBHS held a televised pre-selection in Tampa, beginning at 18:30 EDT (22:30 UTC). This sixth edition of the Tampa Local OTI Festival featured seven songs. It was broadcast on Channel 61.

The winner, and therefore qualified for the national final, was "Cantando por no llorar" written by Esther María Tellado and performed by Jaime Jacob.

Result of the Local OTI Festival – Tampa 1989
R/O	Song	Artist	Songwriter(s)	Result
	"Cantando por no llorar"	Jaime Jacob	Esther María Tellado	Qualified
			Fausto Antonio	
			Gastón García	
			Henry Guerra	
			Dinorah Rivas	
			Roy Soto	
			Jaime Torres	

=== Houston pre-selection ===
On Saturday 26 August 1989, KXLN-TV held a televised pre-selection at the Wortham Theater Center in Houston. This second edition of the Houston Local OTI Festival featured twelve songs, selected from the seventy received. It was presented by Beatriz Alvarado and José Ramírez, assisted by Pedro de Pool, Laurinda Flores, and Manny López, and broadcast on Channel 45. The show featured guest performances by Lupita Ferrer, Raúl Vale, and Carlos Mata.

The jury was composed of Jesús López Guizar, Javier Figueras, Arlette Pacheco, Nicolasa, and Raúl Vale as chairperson. Each juror scored each of the entries between 1 and 5 points.

The winner, and therefore qualified for the national final, was "Matices", written and performed by Félix López; with "Ayúdenme a existir", written by Iván Senteno and performed by Fernando González and Werner Baertschi, placing second; and "Con amor", written and performed by Alejandro Martínez placing third. The first-place trophy was presented by José Adán Treviño, president of the station, the second prize trophy by Beatriz Alvarado, and the third-place trophy by Laurinda Flores. The festival ended with a reprise of the winning entry.

Result of the Local OTI Festival – Houston 1989
R/O	Song	Artist	Songwriter(s)	Result
1	"Qué lindo sería"	Héctor Darío Tapasco	Héctor Darío Tapasco; Martha Tapasco	—N/a
2	"Nuestra herencia"	Ramón Torres	José Villarreal	—N/a
3	"Pobre mundo"	Fey Libertad	Samuel Pérez Córdoba	—N/a
4	"Un emigrante más"	Jesús Rodríguez	Jesús Rodríguez	—N/a
5	"Ganas de vivir"	Theo Alvarado	Carlos Montes	—N/a
6	"Matices"	Félix López	Félix López	Qualified
7	"Grato recuerdo"	Gloria Regil	Ricardo Flores	—N/a
8	"Cantando"	Sergio del Valle	Sergio del Valle	—N/a
9	"Que el hombre cambie el corazón"	José Antonio Gómez	José Antonio Gómez	—N/a
10	"Otra vez estoy de fiesta"	Rafael de Bastos	Rafael de Bastos	—N/a
11	"Ayúdenme a existir"	Fernando González and Werner Baertschi	Iván Senteno	2
12	"Con amor"	Alejandro Martínez	Alejandro Martínez	3

=== Los Angeles pre-selection ===
On Thursday 31 August 1989, KMEX-TV held a televised pre-selection at The Hollywood Palace in Los Angeles. This eleventh edition of the Los Angeles Local OTI Festival featured eight songs, selected from the 412 received. It was presented by Andrés García and Rebeca Rambal, and the musical director was Roberto Arballo Betuco. It was broadcast on Channel 34 on Sunday 3 September, beginning at 20:00 PDT (03:00+1 UTC).

The jury was composed of Chuck Anderson, María del Rey, José Silva, Emily Simonitsch, Kenny O'Brien, Isabela Sotelo, and Eduardo Quezada as chairperson.

The winner, and therefore qualified for the national final, was "¡Vamos América!", written and performed by Juan José; with "Cantaré", performed by Miguel Enrique, placing second.

Result of the Local OTI Festival – Los Angeles 1989
R/O	Song	Artist	Songwriter(s)	Conductor	Result
1	"Joven de 1989"				
2	"Soledades buenas"				
3	"Mundo loco"				
4	"¡Vamos América!"	Juan José	Juan José		Qualified
5	"Amigos"				
6	"Entre penas y alegrías"				
7	"Cantaré"	Miguel Enrique			2
8	"Imagíname"	Margarita Luna	Rubén Trujillo	Javier Pontón	4

=== San Antonio pre-selection ===
On Friday 8 September 1989, KWEX-TV held a televised pre-selection at the Guadalupe Cultural Arts Center in San Antonio, beginning at 20:00 CDT (01:00+1 UTC). This edition of the San Antonio Local OTI Festival featured twelve songs. It was presented by Franco and Blanca Santos, and broadcast on Channel 41 on Sunday 17 September, beginning at 20:30 CDT (01:30+1 UTC).

The jury was composed of Mary Esther Bernal, Ramiro Burr, Paul Elizondo, Rosita Fernández, Ada García, David González, Salomé Gutiérrez, Santiago Nieto, Ovidio Rodríguez, and Juan Tejada.

The songs were performed by Agustín Ariza, Lina del Roble Cronful, Zenaida Alvarado, Sylvia Bezi, Mario Márquez, Cecilio González, Adalberto Gallegos, José Rosario, Luis A. Urbina, Sylvia Montiel, Luis Damián, and Xavier González. Songwriters competing included Mario A. Sánchez, Miguel Nacel, José E. González, Black Alonso, Efraín S. Palacios, Sergio Ruiz, and Jonathán Zarzosa.

The winner, and therefore qualified for the national final, was "Amar otra vez", performed by Xavier González.

Result of the Local OTI Festival – San Antonio 1989
R/O	Song	Artist	Songwriter(s)	Result
	"Amar otra vez"	Xavier González		Qualified

=== Dallas–Fort Worth pre-selection ===
KUVN held a televised pre-selection. This was the first edition of the Dallas–Fort Worth Local OTI Festival. It was broadcast live on Channel 23.

The winner, and therefore qualified for the national final, was "Más no puedo", performed by Luz María Zárate.

Result of the Local OTI Festival – Dallas–Fort Worth 1989
R/O	Song	Artist	Songwriter(s)	Result
	"Más no puedo"	Luz María Zárate		Qualified
	"Amor eterno"	Andrea Teicher	Andrea Elisabeth Teicher	

=== Final ===
The final was held on Thursday 28 September 1989 at the Gusman Center for the Performing Arts in Miami, beginning at 20:00 EDT (00:00+1 UTC), and featuring fourteen songs. It was presented by Lucy Pereda and Antonio Vodanovic, and broadcast live on all Univision affiliates. The show featured guest performances by Lucía Méndez, Franco, Ednita Nazario, Franco De Vita, and Luis Enrique.

The jury was composed of María Sorté, Lolita de la Colina, Yuri, Willy Chirino, Ruddy Rodríguez, Luca Bentivoglio, Henry Sakka, Gabriel Traversari, Madelín Marchant, and Laura Fabián.

The winner was "Hazme sentir" representing WLTV–Miami, written by Margarita Andino, and performed by Iris and Margie; with "Para ser el mejor" representing WCIU–Chicago, written by Daniel Recalde and performed by Liliana Campuzano, placing second; and "Cada día lo mismo" representing KDTV–San Francisco, written and performed by Cristina Stibor, placing third. In addition, Liliana Campuzano received the Best Performer Award, and Héctor Garrido the Best Musical Arrangement Award for "Para ser el mejor". The festival ended with a reprise of the winning entry.

Winner

Result of the final of the XII Festival Nacional de la Canción OTI–Univision
R/O	Song	Artist	Affiliate	Result
	"Hazme sentir"	Iris and Margie	WLTV–Miami	1
	"Matices"	Félix López	KXLN-TV–Houston	—N/a
	"Cantando por no llorar"	Jaime Jacob	WBHS–Tampa	—N/a
	"Nunca me olvidarás"	Rodrigo González	KFTV–Fresno	—N/a
	"¡Vamos América!"	Juan José	KMEX-TV–Los Angeles	—N/a
	"Amar otra vez"	Xavier González	KWEX-TV–San Antonio	—N/a
	"Más no puedo"	Luz María Zárate	KUVN–Dallas–Fort Worth	—N/a
	"Canción para el canto"	Héctor Flabio Martínez and Blanca Morales	KTVW-TV–Phoenix	—N/a
	"Negro y blanco"	Rodrigo Azagra	KLUZ-TV–Albuquerque	—N/a
	"Traigo una voz"	Gerard Grimaud	WXTV–New York	—N/a
	"Cada día lo mismo"	Cristina Stibor	KDTV–San Francisco	3
	"Amor sin papeles"	Lilo González	W48AW–Washington D.C.	—N/a
	"En un rincón de tus ojos"	Héctor Salomón	KINT-TV–El Paso	—N/a
	"Para ser el mejor"	Liliana Campuzano	WCIU–Chicago	2

== At the OTI Festival ==
On 18 November 1989, the OTI Festival was held at the theater of the James L. Knight Center in Miami, hosted by Univision, and broadcast live throughout Ibero-America. Iris and Margie performed "Hazme sentir" in position 17. The song was not among the top-three places revealed at the end.

== After the OTI Festival ==
In 1990, María Conchita Alonso released "Hazme sentir" as the first single from her studio album also titled Hazme sentir. Her cover version of the song peaked at 24 on the Billboard Hot Latin Songs chart.
