= Ana Zanatti =

Portuguese actor and writer who campaigns for LGBTI rights

- Born: Ana Maria Zanatti Olival; 26 June 1949 (age 77); Lisbon, Portugal
- Occupations: Actor; writer; television presenter
- Known for: Portuguese stage, television and films; support for LGBTI rights

Ana Zanatti (born 26 June 1949) is a Portuguese theatre, film and television actor, television presenter, novelist, children's book writer, poet and a women's- and LGBT-rights campaigner.

== Early life ==
Ana Maria Zanatti Olival was born in the Portuguese capital of Lisbon on 26 June 1949. She attended a Catholic school and, later, the historic Pedro Nunes High School, which counts two Portuguese presidents amongst its alumni. She then joined an undergraduate course in Romance philology at the Faculty of Arts of the University of Lisbon, but left this in 1968 to join the theatre course at the National Conservatory in Lisbon. In the same year she made her theatrical debut at Lisbon's Teatro da Trindade with the Companhia Nacional de Teatro, directed by Ribeirinho. Also in 1968, she began her film career in the film Estrada da Vida, directed by Henrique Campos.

== Career ==
At the end of the 1960s, Zanatti was invited to be a presenter at RTP, the Portuguese national broadcaster, where she did voice-overs for documentaries, presented TV news, hosted competitions, presented programmes about arts and presented five editions of RTP's flagship programme Festival da Canção, leading to her winning an award for "Most Popular Presenter" on television. She inaugurated lunchtime broadcasts on RTP in 1970. For 12 years, she was also the institutional voice of Canal Odisseia, a documentary channel. He hosted, along Eládio Clímaco, the OTI Festival 1987 from Teatro São Luiz in Lisbon. She also participated in the first Portuguese soap opera, Vila Faia, which began in 1982. Zanatti has made 17 films for the cinema and television, including Cântico Final (1976) and Jesus Franco's controversial Love Letters of a Portuguese Nun (1977). Her greatest film success was in Dead Man's Seat, directed by António-Pedro Vasconcelos, one of the most popular films ever made in Portugal.

Following a break of six years after her theatrical debut she returned to the theatre in 1975, playing in Equus by Peter Shaffer at the Teatro Variedades in Lisbon. She then translated the play The True Story of Jack the Ripper, and produced it together with actress Zita Duarte. In all, she performed in 11 plays in Lisbon theatres. In 1984, Zanatti was invited to represent Portugal in a show commemorating the entry of Portugal and Spain into the EEC, held in the European Parliament in Strasbourg. In the same year she was one of 25 women chosen to represent Portugal at the EEC's Commission on the Status of Women. In 1988, she co-authored, with Rosa Lobato de Faria, a soap opera, Passerelle. This inspired her to write other television shows, both documentaries and fiction. She also continued to act in soap operas on television and was working on a television film in 2021.

== Publications ==
In 2003 Zanatti published her first novel, Os Sinais do Medo (The Signs of Fear). This was followed by Agradece o Beijo (Thanks for the kiss) in 2005 and E onde é que está o Amor? (And where is the love?). She has also written a trilogy of children's tales and published anthologies. She has been a member of several film juries, including at the Lisbon Gay and Lesbian Film Festival in 2006. In 2009 she made a public presentation at a meeting held to advocate marriage for gay people, where she formally confirmed that she was a lesbian. Her fourth book, O sexo inútil, (Useless Sex) was published in 2016 and addresses LGBT issues. It was the result of letters and emails sent to her by a young woman who asked her for help and with whom she corresponded for year. Zanatti's subsequent research made her realise that many people remain reluctant to reveal their true sexual nature, for fear of upsetting their families or damaging their careers.

== Awards ==
Zanatti has won a number of awards:

- 1980, 1984, 1986. Nova Gente trophy.
- 1980. TV Guia (TV Guide) prize for most popular presenter
- 1986. Sete de Ouro prize for best cinema actress.
- 1997. Golden Globes (Portugal) for best cinema actress
- 2009. Rede Ex Aequo Award. Rede Ex Aequo is an LGBTI youth association.
- 2012. Prémio Arco-Íris (Rainbow prize), in recognition of her contribution to the fight against discrimination and homophobia. This is an award given by the Lesbian, Gay, Bisexual, Trans and Intersexual Association (Associação ILGA Portugal).
