= The Cardinals' Collation =

Play by Júlio Dantas

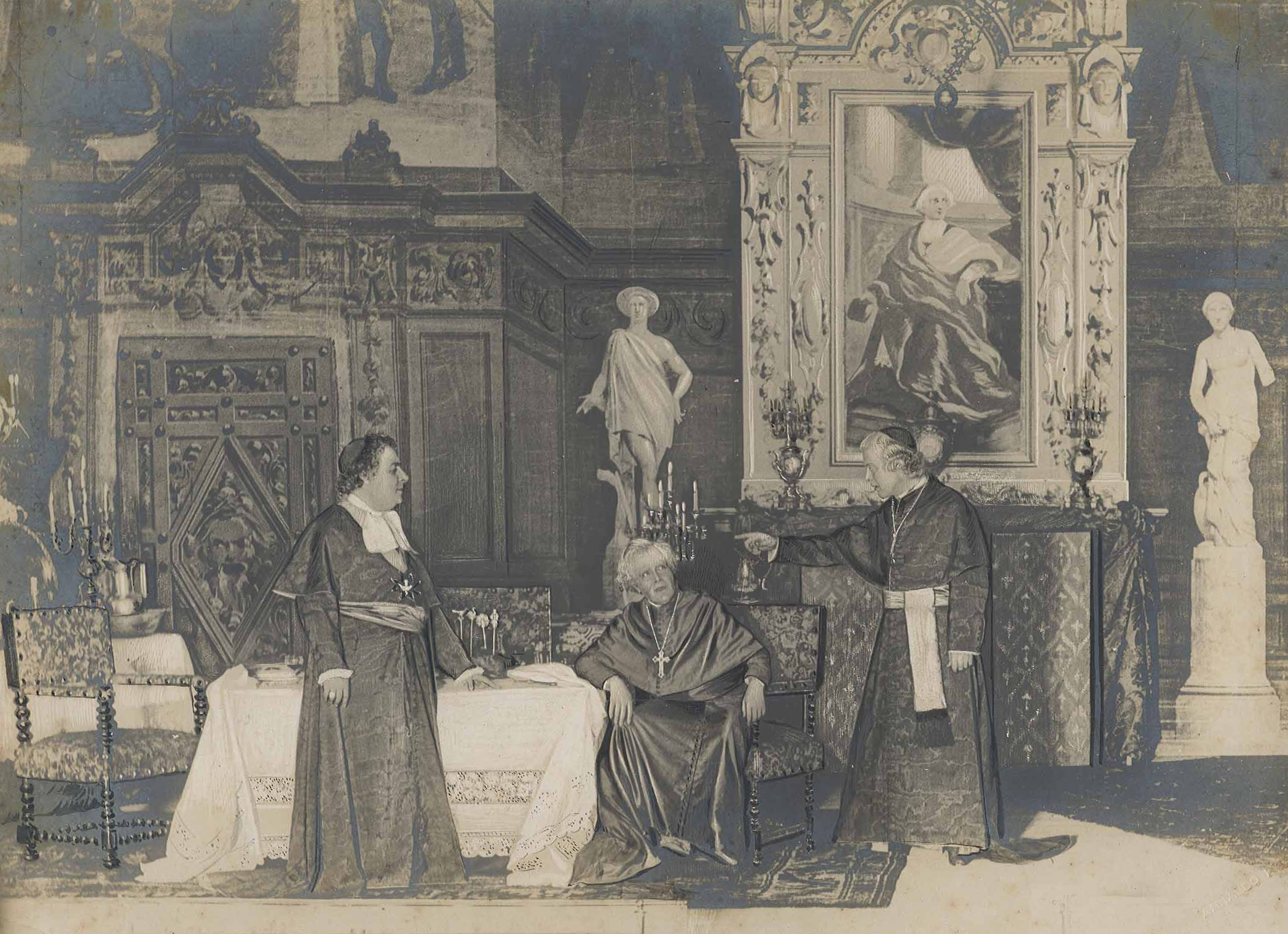
- Photograph of the original production of The Cardinals' Collation, 1902, Teatro Dona Amélia; sets by Luigi Manini; actors João Rosa (Cardinal Gonzaga), Augusto Rosa (Cardinal Montmorency) and Eduardo Brasão (Cardinal Rufo)
- Original language: Portuguese
- Written by: Júlio Dantas
- Characters: Cardinal Gonzaga de Castro; Cardinal Rufo; Cardinal Montmorency; Butler; Cook; Footmen
- Setting: Vatican, during the papacy of Benedict XIV

Premiere
- Date: 24 March 1902
- Place: Teatro Dona Amélia, Lisbon, Portugal

The Cardinals' Collation (Portuguese: A Ceia dos Cardeais (Note: Originally published as A Ceia dos Cardeaes, as it was usually spelt before the Portuguese spelling reforms of the 20th century.)) is one-act play by Portuguese playwright Júlio Dantas, premiered on 24 March 1902. Originally written in Alexandrine couplets, it mostly comprises three monologues by three cardinals — one Portuguese, one French, and one Spanish — who are reminiscing about their first loves over a supper of pheasant with truffles in a richly-appointed Vatican room.

The first adaptation of the work into the English language was made by H. A. Saintsbury; it was first performed at the Globe Theatre in London on 7 February 1926. A BBC Television studio production was made in 1938.
