= Harry Arthur Saintsbury =

English actor and playwright

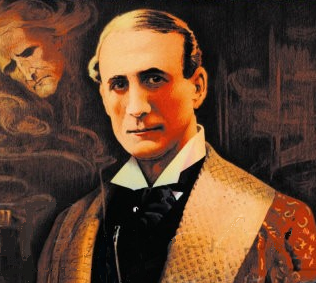
- Saintsbury as Sherlock Holmes, c. 1903
- Born: 18 December 1869; Chelsea, London, England
- Died: 19 June 1939 (aged 69); Westminster, England
- Education: Hurstpierpoint College
- Parent: Frederic Saintsbury

Harry Arthur Saintsbury, usually called H. A. Saintsbury (18 December 1869 – 19 June 1939), was an English actor and playwright. A leading man, he became well known for his stage interpretation of Sherlock Holmes, was an early mentor of Charlie Chaplin, and is considered an authority on the work of Sir Henry Irving.

Called Arthur by his friends, professionally he used his initials. Most of his plays appeared under the nom-de-plume of Jay Nibb.

== Early life ==
The son of Frederic Saintsbury, Esq., of the Bank of England, Saintsbury was born in Chelsea, London, on 18 December 1869, into a middle-class family. His father had married Sarah Charlotte, second daughter of Robert Lemon, FSA, of Her Majesty's State Paper Office, at St Luke's Church, Chelsea, on 13 October 1854.

He was educated at St John's College, Hurstpierpoint, and began his working life as a clerk in the Bank of England.

== Career ==
In March, 1887, Saintsbury made his first appearance on stage at the Opera Comique Theatre as a super in Kate Vaughan's revival of Reade and Taylor's Masks and Faces. His first leading part was as Captain Temple, touring in Pettitt and Harris's melodrama Human Nature.

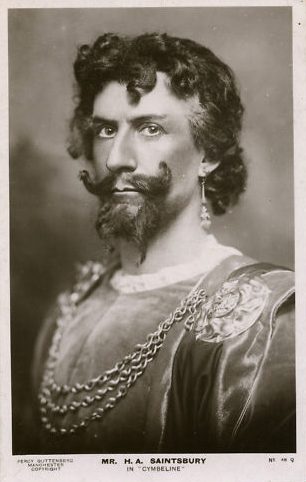
Saintsbury as Iachimo in Cymbeline, c. 1906

As 'Jay Nibb', Saintsbury wrote several plays for the stage. Those produced include Betrayed by a Kiss (1891), The Friend of the People (1893), The Doctor's Shadow (1896), His Relations (1896), The Eleventh Hour (1896, in collaboration with Ronald MacDonald), The Three Musketeers (1898), Chicot the Jester (1898), The First Night (1899), Don Caesar de Bazan (1899), and Jim: a Romance of Cockayne (1903).

Saintsbury made his name as a romantic actor of the "cloak and swords school", and by the end of the 19th century was a considerable force in the Victorian stage. Shortly after the Lyceum Theatre, Birmingham, opened in May 1901, and before it was renamed the Alexandra Theatre, its promoters engaged Saintsbury, "the first star from the great outside to walk the theatre's boards". From the middle of June 1901 he was at the new theatre as leading man for ten weeks, playing flamboyantly in costume dramas such as Jane Shore, David Garrick, and his own Don Cesar de Bazan.

In 1903, Saintsbury took the thirteen-year-old Charlie Chaplin under his wing when Chaplin was hired for a small stage part after being sent to meet Saintsbury at the Green Room Club in Leicester Square for his approval. He was given the role of 'Sam, a news boy' in Saintsbury's play Jim: a Romance of Cockayne, in which Saintsbury was the leading man. The play ran for two weeks, when Chaplin was given the part of Billy, the page boy of Sherlock Holmes in William Gillette's play Sherlock Holmes, in which the title role was again played by Saintsbury. Chaplin was paid two pounds, ten shillings, a week, a good income for a boy.

By 1903, Saintsbury was living at the Green Room Club, which was to remain his home for the rest of his life.

In 1910, Saintsbury played Sherlock Holmes for five months in Sir Arthur Conan Doyle's own stage play The Speckled Band. Charles Millward took over the role when the production moved to New York, but Saintsbury returned as Holmes in a West End revival of the play in 1921. Saintsbury played the role of Holmes again in a 1916 film, The Valley of Fear, which is believed lost, opposite Booth Conway as Professor Moriarty. By the time the film was made, Saintsbury had played Holmes more than a thousand times on stage, and by 1921 he had taken this total to 1,400 performances. His interpretation of Holmes was notably restrained and made a powerful impression on the young Charlie Chaplin, who wrote of Saintsbury in 1964:

Mr. H. A. Saintsbury, who played Holmes on tour, was a living replica of the illustrations in The Strand Magazine. He had a long sensitive face and an inspired forehead. Of all those who played Holmes, he was considered the best, even better than William Gillette, the original Holmes and author of the play.

A former colleague of Sir Henry Irving, near the end of his own life Saintsbury edited and collated We Saw Him Act: a symposium on the art of Sir Henry Irving, consisting of essays, articles, and anecdotes written by Irving's contemporaries. First published in 1939, the work of editing the book was completed by Cecil Palmer and the result was reprinted in 1969. Palmer noted in his introduction

Throughout the preparation of this book, I have always been conscious of the fact that whereas, for me, it was a lovely labour, it was for my distinguished colleague, the late H. A. Saintsbury, a labour of love.

Saintsbury is now considered an authority on the work of Irving.

== Personal life ==
Saintsbury married an Irishwoman, Florence. According to the 1911 census, they were married in 1893, but there is no record of a marriage in England. Saintsbury had two daughters, Dorothie Helen (known as Helen) (1895-1932) and Kathleen (1899-1995). Both became actresses. Helen married first the actor Edgar Norfolk and, after a divorce, Captain Buckley Rutherford, a son of Sir Ernest Rutherford (a wine importer, not the physicist Ernest Rutherford, although they were both born in 1871 and are sometimes confused). The marriage to Rutherford took place in 1932; four months later Rutherford shot himself. Distraught, less than a month after Rutherford’s suicide, Helen also shot herself. There is some suggestion that Helen was married three times, but it is possible this reflects that her first husband was originally called Edgar Greenwood, and changed his name to Norfolk for the stage.

Saintsbury died at St Thomas's Hospital, Westminster, on 19 June 1939, when his home address was 88 Woodstock Road, Bedford Park, leaving an estate valued at £544.

== Publications ==
- Betrayed by a Kiss (play, 1891, as Jay Nibb)
- The Friend of the People (play, 1893, as Jay Nibb)
- The Doctor's Shadow (play, 1896, as Jay Nibb)
- His Relations (play, 1896, as Jay Nibb)
- The Eleventh Hour (play, 1896, as Jay Nibb, in collaboration with Ronald MacDonald)
- The Three Musketeers (play, 1898, as Jay Nibb)
- Chicot the Jester (play, 1898, as Jay Nibb)
- The First Night (play, 1899, as Jay Nibb)
- Don Caesar de Bazan (play, 1899, as Jay Nibb)
- Jim: a Romance of Cockayne (play, 1903, as H. A. Saintsbury)
- The "Speckled band" on its errand of death: Sir Arthur Conan Doyle's new play at the Adelphi (Illustrated London News & Sketch, 1910, with Cyrus Cunfo)
- The Cardinals' Collation (freely adapted from the Portuguese of Julio Dantas) (Cecil Palmer, 1926)
- We Saw Him Act: a symposium on the art of Sir Henry Irving (ed. by Saintsbury, 1939)

== Filmography ==
- The Valley of Fear (1916)
