= Netherlands Antilles in the OTI Festival 1987 =

- OTI Festival 1987
- Participating broadcaster: Antilliaanse Televisie Maatschappij (ATM)
- Country: Netherlands Antilles
- Selection process: Antillean OTI Festival
- Selection date: 20 September 1987

Competing entry
- Song: "Hermanos tú y yo"
- Artist: Rose Heige and Romeo Heige
- Songwriters: J. Hart; Lucille Berry-Haseth; Erroll Colina

Placement
- Final result: Finalist

Participation chronology
◄1985 •	1987	• 1988►

The Netherlands Antilles was represented at the OTI Festival 1987 with the song "Hermanos tú y yo", written by J. Hart, Lucille Berry-Haseth, and Erroll Colina, and performed by Rose Heige and Romeo Heige. The Netherlands Antillean participating broadcaster, Antilliaanse Televisie Maatschappij (ATM), selected its entry through a televised national final. The song, that was performed in position 2, was not among the top-three places revealed.

== National stage ==
Antilliaanse Televisie Maatschappij (ATM), held a national final to select its entry for the 16th edition of the OTI Festival. ATM returned to participate in the festival, after having been absent from the previous festival.

=== National final ===
ATM held the national final on Sunday 20 September 1987, beginning at 20:40 AST (00:40+1 UTC), at its studios in Willemstad. It was broadcast live on TeleCuraçao.

The winner was "Hermanos tú y yo", written by J. Hart, Lucille Berry-Haseth, and Erroll Colina, and performed by Rose Heige and Romeo Heige.

Winner

Result of the Antillean OTI Festival 1987 (Note: Incomplete list of the competing entries.)
R/O	Song	Artist	Result
	"Hermanos tú y yo"	Rose Heige and Romeo Heige	1

== At the OTI Festival ==
On 24 October 1987, the OTI Festival was held at Teatro São Luiz in Lisbon, Portugal, hosted by Radiotelevisão Portuguesa (RTP), and broadcast live throughout Ibero-America. Rose Heige and Romeo Heige performed "Hermanos tú y yo" in position 2, with Erroll Colina conducting the event's orchestra. The song was not among the top-three places revealed.

The festival was broadcast on delay at 22:10 AST (02:10+1 UTC) on TeleCuraçao.
