= United States in the OTI Festival =

- OTI Festival
- Participating broadcaster: 1974–1986: Spanish International Network (SIN); 1987–2000: Univision

Participation summary
- Appearances: 26
- First appearance: 1974
- Last appearance: 2000
- Highest placement: 1st: 1986, 2000
- Host: 1983, 1989, 1990
- Participation history: 1974; 1975; 1976; 1977; 1978; 1979; 1980; 1981; 1982; 1983; 1984; 1985; 1986; 1987; 1988; 1989; 1990; 1991; 1992; 1993; 1994; 1995; 1996; 1997; 1998; 2000

The participation of the United States in the OTI Festival began at the third OTI Festival in 1974. The participating broadcasters representing the country were the Spanish International Network (SIN) until 1986 and Univision since 1987, which were members of the Organización de Televisión Iberoamericana (OTI). Since their debut, they participated in all twenty-six editions. They won the festival two times: in 1986 and 2000; and they hosted the event three times: in 1983, 1989, and 1990.

== History ==
The Spanish International Network (SIN) first, and Univision later, had a long tradition of organizing large-scale televised national competitions to select their entries to the OTI Festival, with many of their affiliates organizing local televised competitions to select their entries to the national final.

They won the OTI Festival for first time in 1986 with the song "Todos" –which sent a message of unity between the Latin community in the country– sung by a trio composed by the performers Dámaris Carbaugh, Miguel Ángel Guerra and Eduardo Fabián. Their second victory was in the last event in 2000 with the song "Mala hierba" performed by Hermanas Chirino.

Apart from their victories, they managed to get two consecutive second places: in 1977 with "Si hay amor vendrá" by Lissette Álvarez, and in 1978 with "Ha vuelto ya" by Susy Leman. They got another second place in 1992 with "No te mueras, América" by Carlo de la Cima. In 1981 and 1982, they got third place.

The OTI Festival was hosted in the United States on three occasions, the first one in 1983 in the Constitution Hall of Washington, D.C., which was presented by Rafael Pineda and Ana Carlota. This edition of the festival was notorious because the event was opened by a message by the President of the United States, Ronald Reagan sent to the Spanish speaking community which hailed their contribution to the cultural diversity of the country. The event was also hosted in 1989 in Miami having the James L. Knight Convention Center as the venue, and in 1990 at the Caesars Palace in Las Vegas.

== Participation overview ==
Table key
1	First place
2	Second place
3	Third place
F	Finalist
SF	Semi-finalist
◇	Contest cancelled

Year	Song	Artist	Songwriter(s)	Conductor	Place	Points
1972	Did not participate					
1973	Did not participate					
1974	"Pero... mi tierra"	Rosita Perú	Larry Martin; Leandro Blanco	Larry Martin	15	1
1975	"Para ganar tu corazón"	José Antonio	Julio Sala	Tony Ramírez	5	5
1976	"Sangre antigua"	Carmen Moreno	Carmen Moreno		19	0
1977	"Si hay amor, volverá"	Lissette Álvarez	Lissette Álvarez	Frank Fiore	2	8
1978	"Ha vuelto ya"	Susy Leman	Ernesto Alejandro	Juan Azúa	2	46
1979	"Y una esperanza más"	Mario Alberto Milar	Mario Alberto Milar		9	16
1980	"El extranjero"	Rammiro Velasco	Rammiro Velasco	Tony Ramírez	13	11
1981	"Cuando fuiste mujer"	Aldo Matta	Vilma Planas; Héctor Garrido	Héctor Garrido	3	22
1982	"Qué equivocado"	Laura Hevia	Laura Hevia	Héctor Garrido	3	25
1983	"Has vencido"	Jorge Baglietto	Vilma Planas	Daniel Freiberg	—N/a	
1984	"Señora mi madre"	Alberto Ruiz	Alberto Ruiz	David González	—N/a	
1985	"Te canto de mi raza"	Zobeida and Frank	Frank López Varona; María Teresa López	Héctor Garrido	—N/a	
1986	"Todos"	Dámaris Carbaugh, Miguel Ángel Guerra, and Eduardo Fabián	Vilma Planas	Juan Salazar	1	—N/a
1987	"Sabes lo que yo quisiera"	Felo Bohr	Mario Palacio	Héctor Garrido	—N/a	
1988	"Así somos, así soy"	Miguel Ángel Mejía	América Vázquez; Miguel Ángel Mejía	Rodolfo Martínez	14	0
1989	"Hazme sentir"	Iris and Margie	Margarita Andino		—N/a	
1990	"Tu amor es mi adicción"	Daniel Recalde	Daniel Recalde	Héctor Garrido	—N/a	
1991	"Qué poca fe"	Elsa Ozuna	Lucho Neves	Lucho Neves	F	—N/a
1992	"No te mueras, América"	Carlo de la Cima	Carlo de la Cima; José Luis Mota	José Luis Mota	2	—N/a
1993	"Esperanza, capricho o viento"	Alma Rocío	Hernán Moreno; Javier D'Angelo	Roberto Chiofalo	—N/a	
1994	"Ganas de gritar"	Héctor Galaz	Omar Sánchez		11	0
1995	"Secreto de amor"	Silvia Bezi	José Villarreal	Roy Velásquez	—N/a	
1996	"Basta ya"	Raffy	Jorge Marcos		—N/a	
1997	"Piel de azúcar"	Luis Damón	Jorge Luis Piloto	Víctor Salazar	SF	—N/a
1998	"Un ángel en mi habitación"	Carlos Abac	Carlos Abac	Diego Fiamingo	F	—N/a
1999	Contest cancelled ◇					
2000	"Hierba mala"	Hermanas Chirino	Angie Chirino; Olga María Chirino; Emilio Estefan		1	—N/a

== Hosting ==
Year	City	Venue	Hosts	Ref.
1983	Washington, D.C.	DAR Constitution Hall	Rafael Pineda; Ana Carlota	
1989	Miami	James L. Knight Convention Center	Lucy Pereda; Antonio Vodanovic; Don Francisco; Verónica Castro; Carlos Mata; María Conchita Alonso; Emmanuel	
1990	Las Vegas	Caesars Palace	Antonio Vodanovic; Alejandra Guzmán; Emmanuel; Fernando Allende; María Conchita Alonso	
