= OTI Festival 1996 =

25th OTI Song Festival

Date and venue
- Final: 14 December 1996
- Venue: Teatro Nacional; Casa de la Cultura Ecuatoriana; Quito, Ecuador

Organization
- Organizer: Organización de Televisión Iberoamericana (OTI)
- Host broadcaster: Asociación de Canales de Televisión del Ecuador (ACTVE)
- Musical director: Claudio Jácome Harb
- Presenters: Christian Johnson; Ximena Aulestia

Participants
- Number of entries: 22
- Non-returning countries: Brazil; Canada
- Participation map: Participating countries Countries that participated in the past but not in 1996

Vote
- Voting system: The members of a single jury selected their favourite songs in a secret vote
- Winning song: Spain "Manos"

The OTI Festival 1996 (Spanish: Vigésimo Quinto Gran Premio de la Canción Iberoamericana, Portuguese: Vigésimo Quinto Grande Prêmio da Canção Ibero-Americana) was the 25th edition of the OTI Festival, held on 14 December 1996 at the Teatro Nacional of the Casa de la Cultura Ecuatoriana in Quito, Ecuador, and presented by Christian Johnson and Ximena Aulestia. It was organised by the Organización de Televisión Iberoamericana (OTI) and host broadcaster the Asociación de Canales de Televisión del Ecuador (ACTVE).

Broadcasters from twenty-two countries participated in the festival. The winner was the song "Manos", written by Chema Purón and Eduardo Leiva, and performed by Anabel Russ representing Spain; with "Cuánto te amo", written by Carlos Castellón, and performed by Guillermo Guido representing Argentina, placing second; and "Bendito amor", written by Ángel Chanon, and performed by Carmina Cannavino representing Peru, placing third.

== Location ==
The Organización de Televisión Iberoamericana (OTI) designated the Asociación de Canales de Televisión del Ecuador (ACTVE), formed by broadcasters such as Ecuavisa, Gamavisión, and Teleamazonas, as the host broadcaster for the 25th edition of the OTI Festival. The association staged the event in Quito. The venue selected was the Teatro Nacional of the Casa de la Cultura Ecuatoriana. The house of Ecuadorian culture is a cultural organization founded in 1944 that has several halls and theaters, including the National Theatre, which seats 2,015 people.

== Participants ==
Broadcasters from twenty-two countries participated in this edition of the OTI festival. The OTI members, public or private broadcasters from Spain, Portugal, and twenty Spanish and Portuguese speaking countries of Ibero-America signed up for the festival. From the countries that participated in the previous edition, Brazil and Canada were absent.

Some of the participating broadcasters, such as those representing Chile, Cuba, Ecuador, and Panama selected their entries through their regular national televised competitions. Other broadcasters decided to select their entry internally.

One performing artist had previously represented the same country in previous editions: Guillermo Guido had won the festival for Argentina in 1988.

Participants of the OTI Festival 1996
Country	Broadcaster(s)	Song	Artist	Songwriter(s)	Language	Conductor
Argentina		"Cuánto te amo"	Guillermo Guido	Carlos Castellón	Spanish	Carlos Castellón
Bolivia		"Has estado con él"	Huáscar Bolívar Vallejo	Huáscar Bolívar Vallejo	Spanish	Claudio Jácome Harb
Chile	TVN	"Te confieso"	José Luis Moya	José Luis Ubiergo	Spanish	
Colombia		"Eres"	Duo Voz en Off	Daniel Betancourt	Spanish	Claudio Jácome Harb
Costa Rica		"Qué bonito sería"	Sergio Coto	Carlos Guzmán Bermúdez	Spanish	
Cuba	ICRT	"Me queda la canción"	Eduardo Antonio	Eduardo Antonio	Spanish	Claudio Jácome Harb
Dominican Republic		"Una historia más"	Frank Ceara	Manuel Tejada	Spanish	Manuel Tejada
Ecuador	ACTVE	"Y vuela"	Aldo y Gianny Salvador	Alberto Caleris	Spanish	Claudio Jácome Harb
El Salvador	TCS	"Con alguien más"	Juan Manuel Bolaños	Guillermo Maldonado	Spanish	Gerardo Parker
Guatemala		"Para encontrar la paz"	Álvaro Aguilar	Álvaro Aguilar	Spanish	Roberto Estrada
Honduras		"Rosas y espinas"	Millicent Viera	José Antonio González	Spanish	Claudio Jácome Harb
Mexico	Televisa	"Del piso a la nube"	Sergio Arzate	Fernando Riva; Kiko Campos	Spanish	
Nicaragua		"Oh, luna"	Manuel Salvador Baltodano	Manuel Salvador Baltodano	Spanish	Claudio Jácome Harb
Panama		"Sin tu cielo azul"	Omar Argel Espinosa	Darío Espinosa	Spanish	
Paraguay		"Por ti mujer"	Jorge Castro	Alberto Aguilera	Spanish	Mauricio Cardozo Ocampo
Peru		"Bendito amor"	Carmina Cannavino	Ángel Chanon	Spanish	
Portugal	RTP	"A minha ilha"	Elaisa	Luis Felipe; Johnny Galvão	Portuguese	Johnny Galvão
Puerto Rico	Telemundo Puerto Rico	"Ay, amor"	Grupo Porto Latino	Rodolfo Barreras	Spanish	Pedro Toledo
Spain	TVE	"Manos"	Anabel Russ	Chema Purón; Eduardo Leiva	Spanish	Eduardo Leiva
United States	Univision	"Basta ya"	Raffy	Jorge Marcos	Spanish	
Uruguay	Sociedad Televisora Larrañaga	"Quiero estrenar"	Los Iracundos	Los Iracundos	Spanish	Julio Frade
Venezuela		"Junto a tu boca"	Dina	Jean Paul Cole	Spanish	

== Festival overview ==
The festival was held on Saturday 14 December 1996, beginning at 18:00 ECT (23:00 UTC). It was presented by Christian Johnson and Ximena Aulestia. The musical director was Claudio Jácome Harb, who conducted the orchestra when required. The stage was designed by Oswaldo Guayasamín.

The winner was the song "Manos", written by Chema Purón and Eduardo Leiva, and performed by Anabel Russ representing Spain; with "Cuánto te amo", written by Carlos Castellón, and performed by Guillermo Guido representing Argentina, placing second; and "Bendito amor", written by Ángel Chanon, and performed by Carmina Cannavino representing Peru, placing third. The first prize was endowed with a monetary amount of US$30,000, the second prize of US$20,000, and the third prize of US$10,000. The festival ended with a reprise of the winning entry.

Winner

Results of the OTI Festival 1996
R/O	Country	Song	Artist	Place
1	Peru	"Bendito amor"	Carmina Cannavino	3
2	Venezuela	"Junto a tu boca"	Dina	—N/a
3	Costa Rica	"Qué bonito sería"	Sergio Coto	—N/a
4	Mexico	"Del piso a la nube"	Sergio Arzate	—N/a
5	Colombia	"Eres"	Duo Voz en Off	—N/a
6	Portugal	"A minha ilha"	Elaisa	—N/a
7	Cuba	"Me queda la canción"	Eduardo Antonio	—N/a
8	Uruguay	"Quiero estrenar"	Los Iracundos	—N/a
9	Panama	"Sin tu cielo azul"	Omar Argel Espinosa	—N/a
10	Guatemala	"Para encontrar la paz"	Álvaro Aguilar	—N/a
11	Spain	"Manos"	Anabel Russ	1
12	Argentina	"Cuánto te amo"	Guillermo Guido	2
13	Chile	"Te confieso"	José Luis Moya	—N/a
14	Dominican Republic	"Una historia más"	Frank Ceara	—N/a
15	Puerto Rico	"Ay, amor"	Grupo Porto Latino	—N/a
16	Paraguay	"Por ti mujer"	Jorge Castro	—N/a
17	Nicaragua	"Oh, luna"	Manuel Salvador Baltodano	—N/a
18	El Salvador	"Con alguien más"	Juan Manuel Bolaños	—N/a
19	United States	"Basta ya"	Raffy	—N/a
20	Honduras	"Rosas y espinas"	Millicent Viera	—N/a
21	Bolivia	"Has estado con él"	Huáscar Bolívar Vallejo	—N/a
22	Ecuador	"Y vuela"	Aldo y Gianny Salvador	—N/a

=== Jury ===
The members of a single jury selected their favourite songs in a secret vote. Only the top three places were revealed. The members of the jury were:

- Marcos Llunas – singer, won the festival for Spain in 1995
- Alejandro Abad – singer-songwriter, wrote the winning entries for Spain in 1993 and 1995
- Luis Padilla Guevara – composer, wrote the entries representing Ecuador in 1985 and 1989
- Victoria Puig de Lange – composer, wrote the entry representing Ecuador in 1978
- Omar Fierro – television host
- Ana Bárbara – singer
- Carlos Bonavides – actor
- Alberto Plaza – singer-songwriter, represented Chile in 1995
- Astrid Gruber – actress
- Betty Pino – radio host

== Broadcast ==
The festival was broadcast in the 22 participating countries where the corresponding OTI member broadcasters relayed the contest through their networks after receiving it live via satellite.

Known details on the broadcasts in each country, including the specific broadcasting stations and commentators are shown in the tables below.

Broadcasters and commentators in participating countries
Country	Broadcaster	Channel(s)	Commentator(s)	Ref.
Spain	TVE	La Primera	José Luis Uribarri	
