= Chema Purón =

Spanish songwriter (born 1951)

- Born: José María Purón Picatoste; 24 March 1951 (age 75); Nájera, Spain
- Occupation: Singer-songwriter

José María Purón Picatoste (born 24 March 1951), better known as Chema Purón is a Spanish singer, songwriter, and music producer. As a singer-songwriter he has recorded four albums. As a songwriter, he has written songs for many artists, and has won the OTI Festival twice and the Viña del Mar International Song Festival once.

As a singer-songwriter he represented Spain in the OTI Festival 1978 with the song "Mi sitio" placing fifth. As a songwriter he represented Spain in the OTI Festival three more times, winning in 1992 with "A dónde voy sin ti" performed by Francisco, and in 1996 with "Manos", co-written with Eduardo Leiva and performed by Anabel Russ. As a songwriter he also represented Spain in the Eurovision Song Contest twice: in 1995 with "Vuelve conmigo" performed by Anabel Conde, and in 2000 with "Colgado de un sueño" performed by Serafín Zubiri.

== Career ==
Chema Purón recorded four albums as singer-songwriter, but from 1982 onwards he devoted himself entirely to writing songs for other artists such as José Luis Rodríguez "El Puma", Nana Mouskouri, and Paloma San Basilio.

In 1978, Televisión Española (TVE) internally selected the song "Mi sitio", written by Purón, as its entry for the OTI Festival 1978. He performed the song himself at the festival and placed fifth, with 18 points, tying with the song from Panama. TVE internally selected three other songs written by him as its entries in subsequent OTI Festivals: in the OTI Festival 1992, the song "A dónde voy sin ti" performed by Francisco won the festival; in the OTI Festival 1994, the song "Cuestión de suerte" performed by Ana María placed second; and in the OTI Festival 1996 the song "Manos", co-written with Eduardo Leiva and performed by Anabel Russ, also won the festival. As a songwriter he also represented the Dominican Republic in the OTI Festival 1987 with the song "Esto tiene que cambiar", co-written with and performed by Julio Sabala.

In 1995, TVE internally selected "Vuelve conmigo", written by Purón and performed by Anabel Conde as its entry for the Eurovision Song Contest 1995. At the contest, the song received 119 points, placed second, and was the best result for Spain in the contest since 1979. In 2000, he submitted the song "Colgado de un sueño" to Eurocanción 2000, the national final organised by TVE to select its entry for the Eurovision Song Contest 2000. The song, performed by Serafín Zubiri won the national final, and represented Spain in Eurovision, where it placed eighteenth, with 18 points, tying with the song from Finland.

In 2003, the song "Este amor es tuyo", written by Purón and performed by Gisela, participated in the 44th edition of the Viña del Mar International Song Festival. The song won the international competition, and Gisela won the best performer award.

He was nominated for the Latin Songwriters Hall of Fame in 2015.

== Discography ==
- Alma (1977)
- A mi compañera (1978)
- A la orilla del mar (1980)
- En ti (1982)
- Lo mejor de Chema Purón (1993)
- Discografía completa (2007)

== Song contests ==
Participations in the OTI festival
Year	Country	Song	Performer	Songwriter(s)	Result
1978	Spain	"Mi sitio"	Chema Purón		5th
1987	Dominican Republic	"Esto tiene que cambiar"	Julio Sabala	Chema Purón; Julio Sabala	—N/a
1992	Spain	"A dónde voy sin ti"	Francisco	Chema Purón	1st
1994	Spain	"Cuestión de suerte"	Ana María	Chema Purón	2nd
1996	Spain	"Manos"	Anabel Russ	Chema Purón; Eduardo Leiva	1st

Participations in the Eurovision Song Contest
Year	Country	Song	Performer	Songwriter	Result
1995	Spain	"Vuelve conmigo"	Anabel Conde	Chema Purón	2nd
2000	Spain	"Colgado de un sueño"	Serafín Zubiri	Chema Purón	18th

Participations in the Viña del Mar International Song Festival
Year	Country	Song	Performer	Songwriter	Result
2003	Spain	"Este amor es tuyo"	Gisela	Chema Purón	1st

Preceded by Trigo Limpio with "Rómpeme mátame"	Spain in the OTI Festival; 1978	Succeeded by Rosa María Lobo with "Viviré"
