= Maria Severa Onofriana =

Portuguese singer

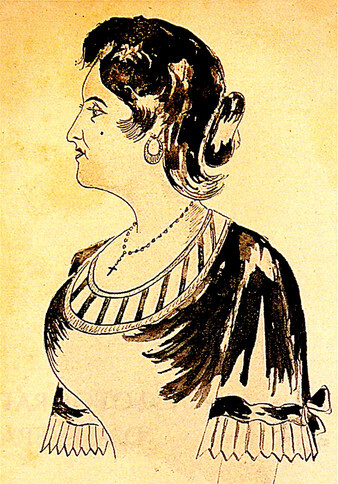
- Unfinished Indian ink drawing labeled "A Severa", by Francisco Augusto Metrass

Background information
- Also known as: A Severa
- Born: Maria Severa Onofriana; 26 July 1820; Lisbon, Portugal
- Died: 30 November 1846 (aged 26) Lisbon, Portugal
- Genres: Fado
- Instrument(s): Vocals, portuguese guitar

Maria Severa Onofriana (26 July 1820 – 30 November 1846), also known simply as A Severa, was a Portuguese fado singer and guitarist. She is regarded, in her short life, as the first fado singer to have risen to fame, attaining a near-mythical status after her death. Fado has been described as the Portuguese expression of "the blues", and fado roughly means 'fate'.

== Biography ==
Maria Severa Onofriana was born in Lisbon, Portugal, in the neighborhood of Madragoa in 1820. She was the daughter of Severo Manuel and Ana Gertrudes. Severa's father was of cigano ancestry. Her mother was originally from Ovar, migrated to Lisbon with Ovar fishermen, worked as a prostitute and became the owner of a tavern. Severa's mother had the nickname A Barbuda ('the bearded woman'). Severa is said to have been a tall and gracious courtesan or prostitute, and would sing the fado in taverns where she would also play the Portuguese guitar. One of her lovers was Francisco de Paula Portugal e Castro, 13th Count of Vimioso.

She died of tuberculosis aged 26, on 30 November 1846 in Rua do Capelão, Lisbon, and was buried in a common grave in the Alto de São João Cemetery.

== In popular culture ==
Maria Severa's fame grew also due to a novel by Júlio Dantas, entitled A Severa, which was then made into a play that was brought to the stage in 1901. In 1931, director Leitão de Barros turned the play into the first Portuguese film to feature sound, A Severa.

A romantic musical, Maria Severa Onofriana, opened on 19 July 2011 at the Shaw Festival in Niagara-On-The-Lake, Ontario, with book, music and lyrics by Jay Turvey and Paul Sportelli, directed by Jackie Maxwell and starring Julie Martell as Maria Severa.
