= Luiz Francisco Rebello =

Portuguese lawyer, playwright, and theatre critic

Luiz Francisco Rebello GOSE ComIH
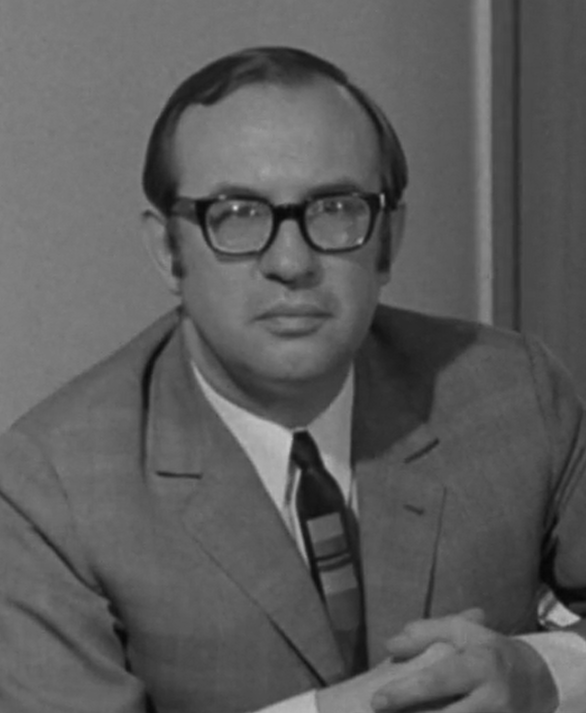
- Born: Luiz Francisco Correia Mendes Rebello; 10 September 1924; Lisbon, Portugal
- Died: 8 December 2011 (aged 87); Lisbon, Portugal
- Occupations: Lawyer, playwright, theatre critic

Luiz Francisco Rebello GOSE ComIH (10 September 1924 – 8 December 2011) was a Portuguese lawyer, playwright, drama critic, theatrical historian, translator and essayist.

Luiz Francisco Rebello is the most credited Portuguese theatrical historian, being the author of works published on Portuguese theatrical history and theatre criticism and he is a prolific playwright.

== Career ==
Rebello was a founder and a member of the direction of several experimental theatre groups, becoming one of the founders of the “Teatro-Estúdio do Salitre” in 1946 along with Gino Saviotti and in 1948 founded the “Companheiros do Páteo das Comédias”, two of the most important experimental groups of the post-war period. Together with José Saramago, Armindo Magalhães, Manuel da Fonseca and Urbano Tavares Rodrigues Rebello was, in 1992, one of the founders of the National Front for the Defense of Culture (Frente Nacional para a Defesa da Cultura) (BDNF).

His noted anthology Teatro Moderno: Caminhos e figuras was first published in short volumes at irregular periods during the year of 1957 by “Círculo do Livro”, a label that belonged to Vítor Palla (1922–2006) and Orlando Costa (1929–2006). The 2nd edition, published in 1964, was printed on the label “Prelo”, on a theatre collection directed by Rebello himself. In the 1964 edition he added new essays such as those by Shaw, Jarry, Synge, Piscator, Oskar Schlemmer, Meyerhold, Giraudoux and Sartre.

He obtained a law degree from the University of Lisbon and chaired the Portuguese Society of Authors (Sociedade Portuguesa de Autores) for 30 years from 1973 to 2003, specializing in the area of copyright. He was also vice president of the International Confederation of Societies of Authors and Composers.

In 1971, Rebello was appointed director of the Teatro São Luiz in Lisbon, a position that he would resign the following year because of censorship disagreements. Rebello has been a contributor to numerous newspapers and magazines, including the Colóquio-Letras, Jornal de Letras, Seara Nova and Vértice. Since 1971, he has also contributed to the Dicionário do Teatro Português, the dictionary of Portuguese theatre. He has also translated the work of several influential playwrights, including William Shakespeare, Bertolt Brecht, Samuel Beckett, August Strindberg, and Henrik Ibsen.

== Acclaim ==
Rebello received many prestigious awards; he was made a Commander of the Order of Prince Henry the Navigator (1985), received the insignia of the Knight of the Ordre national du Mérite (1991) which was granted by the French Minister of Communication Georges Kiejman, and was made a Grand Officer of the Order of Saint James of the Sword (1999). He also received the Prémio da Sociedade Portuguesa de Autores in 1994.

== Bibliography ==
- Literatura Portuguesa no Mundo (Porto Editora) (ISBN 972-0-01251-X).
- O Grande Livro dos Portugueses (Círculo de Leitores) (ISBN 972-42-0143-0)
