= Dead Man's Seat =

1984 film

- Directed by: António-Pedro Vasconcelos
- Written by: Carlos Saboga; António-Pedro Vasconcelos
- Starring: Ana Zanatti
- Cinematography: João Rocha
- Release date: 25 October 1984
- Running time: 120 minutes
- Country: Portugal
- Language: Portuguese

Dead Man's Seat (Portuguese: O Lugar do Morto) is a 1984 Portuguese drama film directed by António-Pedro Vasconcelos. The film was selected as the Portuguese entry for the Best Foreign Language Film at the 57th Academy Awards, but was not accepted as a nominee.

== Cast ==
- Ana Zanatti as Ana Mónica
- Pedro Oliveira as Álvaro Serpa
- Teresa Madruga as Marta
- Luís Lima Barreto as Álvaro Allen
- Carlos Coelho as Inspector Moreira
- Isabel Mota as Dulce
- Ruy Furtado as Neves
- Diogo Vasconcelos as João
- Natalina José as Janitor

== See also ==
- List of submissions to the 57th Academy Awards for Best Foreign Language Film
- List of Portuguese submissions for the Academy Award for Best Foreign Language Film
