= O Homem dos Olhos Tortos =

- Directed by: José Leitão de Barros
- Based on: O Mistério da Rua Saraiva de Carvalho by Reinaldo Ferreira
- Starring: Álvaro Pereira; Raquel Barros; Alda de Aguiar
- Cinematography: Manuel Maria da Costa Veiga
- Production company: Lusitânia Film
- Release date: 1918
- Country: Portugal
- Budget: 30,000 escudos

O Homem dos Olhos Tortos (literally "The Man of the Crooked Eyes") is a 1918 Portuguese detective silent film directed by José Leitão de Barros (with art director Luís Reis Santos also sometimes mentioned as co-director), with a cast of amateur actors (that mostly had no roles after this film) with António Sarmento as the hero and Álvaro Pereira as the title-character villain.

== Cast ==
- António Sarmento as Gil Goes
- Álvaro Pereira as Waldemar Frankel
- Raquel Barros as Margarida Costa
- Alda de Aguiar as Rosa de Coimbra
- Filipe Melo as Lilito de Coimbra
