= OTI Festival 1987 =

16th OTI Song Festival

Date and venue
- Final: 24 October 1987
- Venue: Teatro São Luiz; Lisbon, Portugal

Organization
- Organizer: Organização da Televisão Ibero-americana (OTI)
- Supervisor: Darío de la Peña

Production
- Host broadcaster: Radiotelevisão Portuguesa (RTP)
- Director: Luís Andrade
- Musical director: Fernando Correia Martins
- Presenters: Ana Zanatti; Eládio Clímaco

Participants
- Number of entries: 24
- Returning countries: Brazil; Spain; Netherlands Antilles; Nicaragua
- Participation map: Participating countries

Vote
- Voting system: Each member of a single jury awards 5–1 points to its five favourite songs in a secret vote
- Winning song: Venezuela "La felicidad está en un rincón de tu corazón"

The OTI Festival 1987 (Portuguese: Décimo Sexto Grande Prêmio da Canção Ibero-Americana, Spanish: Decimosexto Gran Premio de la Canción Iberoamericana) was the 16th edition of the OTI Festival, held on 24 October 1987 at Teatro São Luiz in Lisbon, Portugal, and presented by Ana Zanatti and Eládio Clímaco. It was organised by the Organização da Televisão Ibero-americana (OTI) and host broadcaster Radiotelevisão Portuguesa (RTP). This was the second and last time the festival was held in a Portuguese-speaking country, the first being the 1973 festival.

Broadcasters from twenty-four countries participated in the festival. The winner was the song "La felicidad está en un rincón de tu corazón", written by Luis Gerardo Tovar and Arnoldo Nali, and performed by Alfredo Alejandro representing Venezuela; with "Mi amigo el cóndor", written by Romeo Caicedo, and performed by Gustavo Velázquez representing Ecuador, placing second; and "¡Ay, amor!", written and performed by Ana Gabriel representing Mexico, and "Bravo samurái", written by Vicky Larraz, Esteban Sastre, and Carlos Fernández, and performed by Larraz herself representing Spain, both placing third.

== Location ==
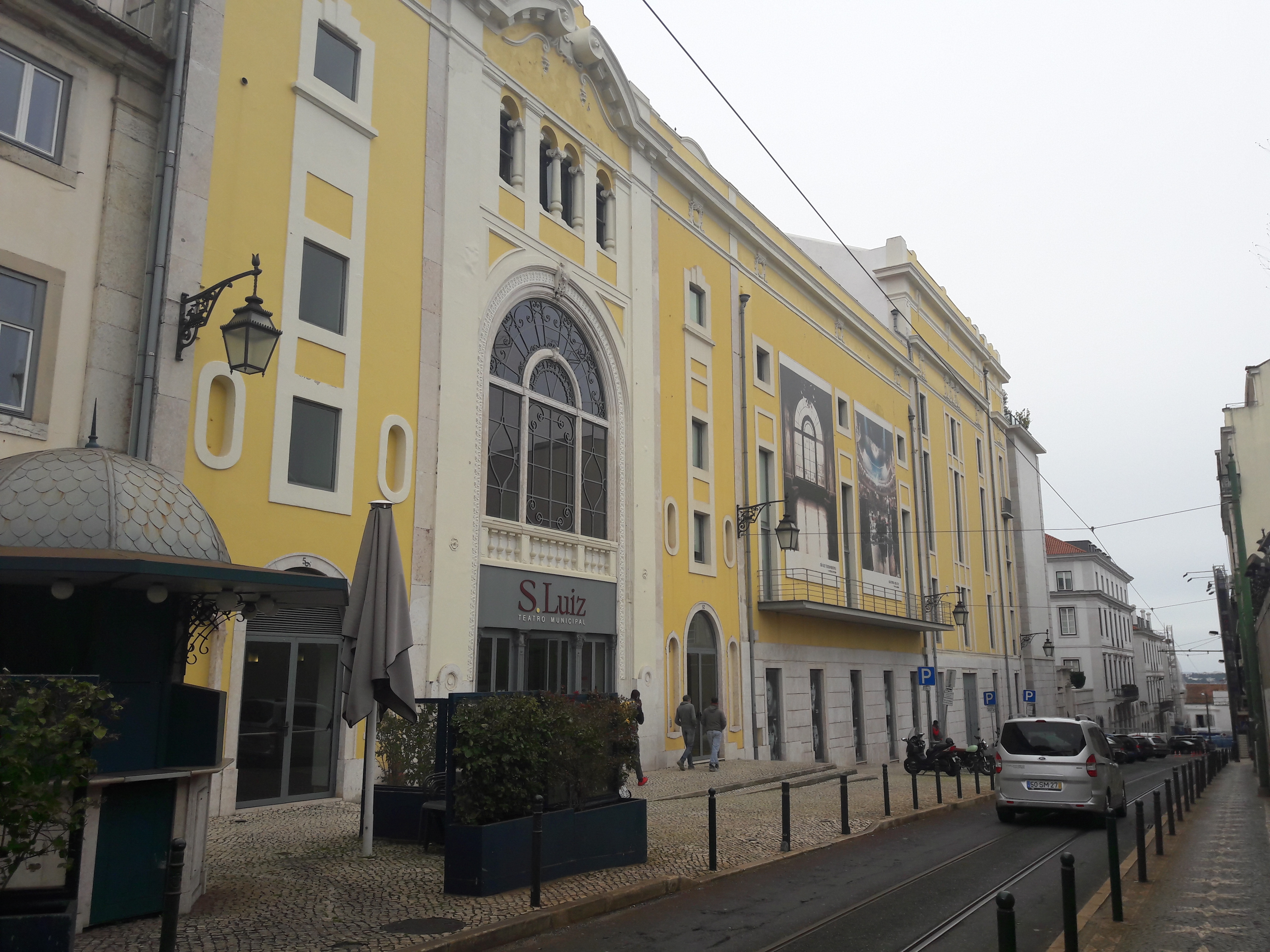
Teatro São Luiz, Lisbon – host venue of the OTI Festival 1987.

The Organização da Televisão Ibero-americana (OTI) designated Radiotelevisão Portuguesa (RTP) as the host broadcaster for the 16th edition of the OTI Festival. RTP staged the event in Lisbon. The venue selected was the Teatro São Luiz, a theatre opened in 1894 and designed by Louis Reynaud.

== Participants ==
Broadcasters from twenty-four countries participated in this edition of the OTI festival. The OTI members, public or private broadcasters from Spain, Portugal, and twenty-two Spanish and Portuguese speaking countries of Ibero-America signed up for the festival, with Brazil, Spain, the Netherlands Antilles, and Nicaragua returning after having missed the previous edition. All the countries that had debuted at the festival until then participated this year. TeleAruba intended to participate independently in the festival for the first time, and had selected through a national final the song "Mi viejo", written by Don Ramon Krozendijk and Edwin Abath and performed by Abath himself, as the first entry representing Aruba in the festival; however, due to a miscommunication with OTI, the debut was not possible.

Some of the participating broadcasters, such as those representing Chile, Guatemala, Mexico, the Netherlands Antilles, and the United States, selected their entries through their regular national televised competitions. Other broadcasters decided to select their entry internally.

Participants of the OTI Festival 1987
Country	Broadcaster(s)	Song	Artist	Songwriter(s)	Language	Conductor
Argentina		"Todavía la vida"	Lalo Márquez y Daniel Altamirano	Marta Bruno; Lalo Márquez	Spanish	Fernando Correia Martins
Bolivia		"Utopía"	Hombre Nuevo	Reynaldo Rebollo	Spanish	Charly Barrionuevo
Brazil		"Estrela do norte"	Leila Pinheiro	Eduardo Gudin; Costa Neto	Portuguese	Fernando Correia Martins
Canada	CFMT-TV	"Vuelve a mí"	Alberto Olivera	Alberto Olivera	Spanish	Guillermo Azevedo
Chile	TVN; UCTV; UTV	"Chocando paredes"	Eduardo Valenzuela	Eduardo Valenzuela	Spanish	Francisco Larraín
Colombia		"Vengan a mi hogar"	Marta Patricia Yepes	Marta Patricia Yepes; Amado Jaén	Spanish	Josep Mas Portet
Costa Rica		"Soy de un país que ama"	Hilda Chacón Mata	Hilda Chacón Mata	Spanish	Álvaro Esquivel Valverde
Dominican Republic		"Esto tiene que cambiar"	Julio Sabala	Julio Sabala; Chema Purón	Spanish	José Juan Almela
Ecuador		"Mi amigo el cóndor"	Gustavo Velásquez	Romeo Caicedo	Spanish	Juan Salazar
El Salvador	TCS	"Nadie más que tú"	Iliana Posas	Iliana Posas	Spanish	Fernando Correia Martins
Guatemala		"Que Dios nos libre de la locura del hombre"	Chito Ordóñez	Chito Ordóñez	Spanish	Fernando Correia Martins
Honduras		"Uno más"	Rodolfo Torres	Fernando Chacón; Rodolfo Torres	Spanish	Fernando Correia Martins
Mexico	Televisa	"¡Ay, amor!"	Ana Gabriel	Ana Gabriel	Spanish	Chucho Ferrer
Netherlands Antilles	ATM	"Hermanos tú y yo"	Rose Heige and Romeo Heige	J. Hart; Lucille Berry-Haseth; Erroll Colina	Spanish	Erroll Colina
Nicaragua	SSTV	"La vida es solo un sueño"	María Lili Delgado	Emilio Ortega Ayón	Spanish	Andrés Sánchez
Panama		"Blanco y negro"	Olga Cecilia	Lorena Moreno; Milton Vargas	Spanish	Toby Muñoz
Paraguay		"Procura"	Rolando Ojeda	Ricardo "Pilo" Lloret	Spanish	Fernando Correia Martins
Peru		"He aprendido a volar"	Jenny Higginson	Emilio Pepe Ortega	Spanish	Emilio Pepe Ortega
Portugal	RTP	"Não me tirem este mar"	Teresa Maiuko	José Jorge Letria; Carlos Mendes	Portuguese	Fernando Correia Martins
Puerto Rico	Telemundo Puerto Rico	"Soy mujer"	Marisol Calero	Marisol Calero; Alejandro Montalván	Spanish	Ito Serrano
Spain	TVE	"Bravo samurái"	Vicky Larraz	Vicky Larraz; Esteban Sastre; Carlos Fernández	Spanish	Eduardo Leiva
United States	Univision	"Sabes lo que yo quisiera"	Felo Bohr	Mario Palacio	Spanish	Héctor Garrido
Uruguay	Sociedad Televisora Larrañaga	"Volvamos a empezar"	Fabricio	Mario de Azagra	Spanish	Julio Frade
Venezuela		"La felicidad está en un rincón de tu corazón"	Alfredo Alejandro	Luis Gerardo Tovar; Arnoldo Nali	Spanish	Arnoldo Nali

== Festival overview ==
The festival was held on Saturday 24 October 1987, beginning at 22:30 WET (22:30 UTC). It was directed by Luís Andrade, and presented by Ana Zanatti and Eládio Clímaco. This was the second and last time the festival was held in a Portuguese-speaking country (the first being the 1973 festival), so it was mainly presented in Portuguese. The musical director was Fernando Correia Martins, who conducted the 40-piece orchestra when required.

The show began with images of the arrival at the venue of Mário Soares –President of Portugal–, Aníbal Cavaco Silva –Prime Minister–, and his wife Maria Cavaco Silva, who attended the event. Several performances by the National Ballet of Portugal, filmed on location in Lisbon and Sintra and choreographed by Armando Jorge and José Arantes, were interspersed with the competing songs. The interval act consisted of a tribute to all the poets born in Spanish and Portuguese speaking countries with Paco Bandeira paying tribute to Pablo Neruda, Lara Li to Vinicius de Moraes, Janita Salomé to Federico García Lorca, and Teresa Tarouca to Luís de Camões.

The winner was the song "La felicidad está en un rincón de tu corazón", written by Luis Gerardo Tovar and Arnoldo Nali, and performed by Alfredo Alejandro representing Venezuela; with "Mi amigo el cóndor", written by Romeo Caicedo, and performed by Gustavo Velázquez representing Ecuador, placing second; and "¡Ay, amor!", written and performed by Ana Gabriel representing Mexico, and "Bravo samurái", written by Vicky Larraz, Esteban Sastre, and Carlos Fernández, and performed by Larraz herself representing Spain, both placing third. There was a trophy for each of the first three places. The first prize trophy was delivered by Guillermo Cañedo, president of OTI; the second prize trophy by José Manuel Coelho Ribeiro, president of RTP; and the third prize trophy by Alfredo Escobar, representative of the OTI programs committee. The festival ended with a reprise of the winning entry.

Winner

Results of the OTI Festival 1987
R/O	Country	Song	Artist	Place
1	Panama	"Blanco y negro"	Olga Cecilia	—N/a
2	Netherlands Antilles	"Hermanos tú y yo"	Rose Heige and Romeo Heige	—N/a
3	Chile	"Chocando paredes"	Eduardo Valenzuela	—N/a
4	Argentina	"Todavía la vida"	Lalo Márquez y Daniel Altamirano	—N/a
5	Bolivia	"Utopía"	Hombre Nuevo	—N/a
6	Portugal	"Não me tirem este mar"	Teresa Maiuko	—N/a
7	Colombia	"Vengan a mi hogar"	Marta Patricia Yepes	—N/a
8	Venezuela	"La felicidad está en un rincón de tu corazón"	Alfredo Alejandro	1
9	Paraguay	"Procura"	Rolando Ojeda	—N/a
10	Honduras	"Uno más"	Rodolfo Torres	—N/a
11	Brazil	"Estrela do norte"	Leila Pinheiro	—N/a
12	Guatemala	"Que Dios nos libre de la locura del hombre"	Chito Ordóñez	—N/a
13	Costa Rica	"Soy de un país que ama"	Hilda Chacón Mata	—N/a
14	United States	"Sabes lo que yo quisiera"	Felo Bohr	—N/a
15	Dominican Republic	"Esto tiene que cambiar"	Julio Sabala	—N/a
16	Peru	"He aprendido a volar"	Jenny Higginson	—N/a
17	Puerto Rico	"Soy mujer"	Marisol Calero	—N/a
18	Ecuador	"Mi amigo el cóndor"	Gustavo Velásquez	2
19	Mexico	"¡Ay, amor!"	Ana Gabriel	3
20	Canada	"Vuelve a mí"	Alberto Olivera	—N/a
21	El Salvador	"Nadie más que tú"	Iliana Posas	—N/a
22	Spain	"Bravo samurái"	Vicky Larraz	3
23	Nicaragua	"La vida es solo un sueño"	María Lili Delgado	—N/a
24	Uruguay	"Volvamos a empezar"	Fabricio	—N/a

=== Jury ===
Each of the nine members of the single jury awarded 5–1 points to its five favourite songs in a secret vote. The voting was supervised by OTI representative Darío de la Peña. Only the top three places were revealed, with third place awarded to two songs jointly. The members of the jury were:

- Amália Rodrigues – fado singer (chairperson)
- Jairo – singer-songwriter
- Geraldo Casé – television producer
- Mirla Castellanos – singer, represented Venezuela in 1972 and 1975
- Silvia Pinal – actress
- Massiel – singer
- Olga Guillot – singer
- Betty Missiego – singer, represented Peru in 1972
- Raul Solnado – actor

== Broadcast ==
The festival was broadcast in the 24 participating countries where the corresponding OTI member broadcasters relayed the contest through their networks after receiving it live via satellite. It was reported that the event was also broadcast in Bulgaria, Czechoslovakia, Hungary, and Yugoslavia.

Known details on the broadcasts in each country, including the specific broadcasting stations and commentators are shown in the tables below.

Broadcasters and commentators in participating countries
Country	Broadcaster	Channel(s)	Commentator(s)	Ref.
Canada	CFMT-TV (Note: Delayed broadcast at 22:30 EDT (02:30+1 UTC))			
Chile	TVN	Canal 7 (Note: Delayed broadcast at 21:30 CLST (00:30+1 UTC))		
Chile	UTV	Canal 11		
Chile	UCTV	Canal 13		
Colombia	Inravisión	Cadena Uno		
Netherlands Antilles	ATM	TeleCuraçao (Note: Delayed broadcast at 22:10 AST (02:10+1 UTC))		
Portugal	RTP	RTP1		
Spain	TVE	TVE 2	Beatriz Pécker	
United States	Univision (Note: Delayed broadcast later that day by all Univision affiliates, each in their own time zone.)			
