= Ximena Aulestia =

Ecuadorian journalist and former beauty queen

- Born: Ximena Lourdes Aulestia Díaz; 25 September 1952 (age 73); Rio de Janeiro, Brazil
- Citizenship: Colombia; Ecuador
- Occupation: Journalist
- Years active: Since 1982
- Spouses: Pablo Rivadeneira (m. 1969–1985) Manuel Rueda (m. 1993–2002)
- Parents: Víctor Florencio Aulestia Mier (father); Sara Roxana Díaz Guerrero (mother)

Ximena Lourdes Aulestia Díaz (born 25 September 1952) is an Ecuadorian journalist and beauty pageant titleholder. At Miss Ecuador 1969, she was crowned Miss World Ecuador.

== Biography ==
Ximena Aulestia was born on 25 September 1952 in Rio de Janeiro, Brazil as a result of her parents, General Víctor Florencio Aulestia Mier and Sara Roxana Díaz Guerrero, being in the city because of a diplomatic mission to Brazil from Ecuador, giving her immediate Ecuadorian citizenship. She was born the sixth of seven children, second of her father's second marriage. In 1972, Aulestia's father became the Ecuadorian Minister of Defense to Guillermo Rodríguez, at the same time when Rodríguez founded the Institute of National Higher Studies.

For her first ten years of life, Aulestia lived in the capital of Brazil, Brasília, returning to Ecuador in 1962 with her family to settle in Quito, the nation's capital. In 1969, she competed in Miss Ecuador 1969 as Miss Pichincha and was crowned Miss World Ecuador, the first finalist, and so represented Ecuador in the Miss World contest of that year. She hosted the OTI Festival 1996 held in Quito along Christian Johnson.

== Citations ==
Awards and achievements
Preceded by Marcia Ramos	Miss World Ecuador; 1969	Succeeded by Virginia Monteverde
