= A Severa (film) =

1931 film

- Poster for the film
- Directed by: José Leitão de Barros
- Written by: Júlio Dantas; J. Bernard Brunius; René Clair
- Starring: Dina Teresa; António Luis Lopes; Antonio Lavradio; Ribeiro Lopes
- Cinematography: Salazar Dinis; Paul Guichard
- Music by: Frederico de Freitas
- Distributed by: Imaginação; Video e Televisão; Lisvendas Audio e Video
- Release date: 17 July 1931
- Running time: 110 minutes
- Country: Portugal
- Language: Portuguese

A Severa (lit. 'The stern/grave one') is a 1931 Portuguese film directed by Leitão de Barros. It is the first Portuguese talking film. A biopic of the fado singer Maria Severa Onofriana, known as A Severa, it is based on a play by Júlio Dantas.

== Cast ==
- Dina Teresa as Maria Severa Onofriana dita A Severa
- António Luis Lopes as Dom João, Count of Marialva
- Antonio Lavradio (D. António de Almeida Portugal, 10th Count of Avintes) as Dom José
- Ribeiro Lopes as Judge
- Silvestre Alegrim as Timpanas, Coach Driver
- Costinha as Marquis of Seide (as Augusto Costa)
- Antonio Fagim as Romão, Landlord
- Patrício Álvares as Diogo
- Eduardo Dores as Gypsy
- Oliveira Martins as The Duke

== Production ==
The film was shot in Paris.

== Legacy ==
A severa was included in the film series for the New Babilonians. Crossing the Border exhibition, curated by Pedro G. Romero, which took place at the Galeria Municipal do Porto in September-November 2021. A Severa was part of the 2023 "A Brief History of Portuguese Cinema" screenings in Setúbal.
