= Victoria Puig de Lange =

Ecuadorian diplomat (1916–2008)

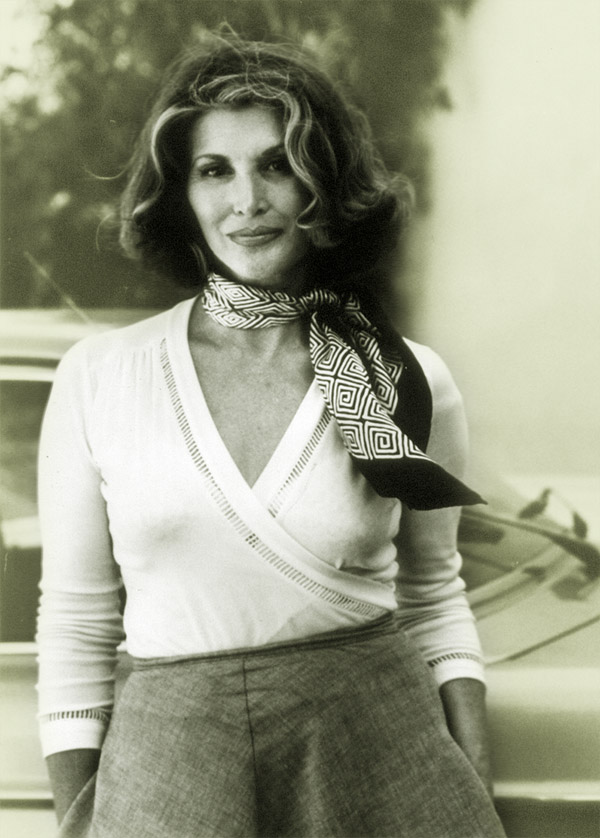
Victoria Puig de Lange, 1985

Victoria Puig de Lange (3 December 1916 in Guayaquil – 14 May 2008 in Miami) was an Ecuadorian author, composer, and diplomat. Her long career in journalism placed her on the staff of Vanidades, and included an international syndicated column for ALA. In 1984 she became Editor-in-Chief of Harper's Bazaar (Spanish edition).

In 2003, Puig, who went by the nickname "Chichi", wrote Sol Con Agua, an autobiographical novel published by Editorial Vistazo. It combined elements of the magic realism literary style with her memoirs of a life "surrounded by presidents, movie stars, and international personalities."

As Editor-in-Chief of Harper's Bazaar, Puig entered center stage of the fashion world, regularly attending the fashion weeks of London, Milan, and Paris. She served as judge in Occhio D'Oro to select the best Italian designer. This experience led her to take interest in Latin American designers. She co-founded the first Latin American fashion week and, with Beth Sobol, Miami Fashion Week.

Puig, a daughter of diplomats (Ambassador Carlos Puig Vilazar and Consul General Rosa Parada de Puig), represented her country as Consul General of Ecuador in Miami. She also represented Ecuador, as a songwriter at the OTI Festival 1978, after the release of her LP La Novia del Rio, a collection of ballads with the rhythms and sounds of her native land.

She married three times, with Luis Aguirre Luque (1935), James Dall Brown (1941), and Harold Lange Browne (1947). She also had 3 sons.
