= United States in the OTI Festival 1983 =

- OTI Festival 1983
- Participating broadcaster: Spanish International Network (SIN)
- Country: United States
- Selection process: National OTI–SIN Festival
- Selection date: 8 October 1983

Competing entry
- Song: "Has vencido"
- Artist: Jorge Baglietto
- Songwriter: Vilma Planas

Placement
- Final result: Finalist

Participation chronology
◄1982 •	1983	• 1984►

The United States was represented at the OTI Festival 1983 with the song "Has vencido", written by Vilma Planas and performed by Jorge Baglietto. The participating broadcaster representing the country, the Spanish International Network (SIN), selected its entry through a national televised competition. The song, that was performed in position 9, was not among the top-five places revealed. In addition, SIN was also the host broadcaster and staged the event at the DAR Constitution Hall in Washington, D.C..

== National stage ==
The Spanish International Network (SIN) held a national televised competition to select its entry for the 12th edition of the OTI Festival. This was the sixth edition of the National OTI–SIN Festival. In the final, each song represented a SIN affiliate, each of which had selected its entry through a local pre-selection.

=== Los Angeles pre-selection ===
On Sunday 25 August 1983, KMEX-TV held a televised pre-selection at its studios in Los Angeles. This fifth edition of the Los Angeles Local OTI Festival featured ten songs. It was broadcast on Channel 34.

The winner, and therefore qualified for the national final, was "Una canción", written and performed by Yari Moré.

Qualifier

Result of the Local OTI Festival – Los Angeles 1983
R/O	Song	Artist	Songwriter(s)	Result
	"El camino del amor"	Candy Soza		
	"Igual que los demás"	Tina María		
	"Una canción"	Yari Moré	Yari Moré	Qualified
	"Cambios"	Andrea Cash		
	"Yo soy el que te ama"	Paco Xavier		
	"Tu egoísmo"	Bobby Ríos		
	"Mi vivir sin ti"	Rafael Villalobos		
	"Intenta ser feliz"	Lobo		
	"No temas al amor"	José Ricardo		
	"Te sigo esperando"	Juan Guillermo Aguirre "Santiago"		

=== Northern California pre-selection ===
KCSO held a televised pre-selection. This edition of the Northern California Local OTI Festival featured nine songs.

The winner, and therefore qualified for the national final, was "Soñador", written by Eleazar Cortés and performed by Javier Vargas. In addition, Javier Vargas received the Best Performer Award, and Eleazar Cortés the Best Song Writer Award.

Result of the Local OTI Festival – Northern California 1983 (Note: Incomplete list of the competing entries.)
R/O	Song	Artist	Songwriter(s)	Result
	"Soñador"	Javier Vargas	Eleazar Cortés	Qualified

=== Final ===
The final was held on Saturday 8 October 1983 at the Miami Jai-Alai Fronton in Miami. It was presented by María Olga Fernández and Pepe Domingo Castaño, and was broadcast live on all SIN affiliates. The winner was "Has vencido" representing WXTV–New York, written by Vilma Planas and performed by Jorge Baglietto. In addition, Baglietto received the Best Performer Award. The festival ended with a reprise of the winning entry.

Winner

Result of the final of the National OTI–SIN Festival 1983
R/O	Song	Artist	Affiliate	Result
	"Has vencido"	Jorge Baglietto	WXTV–New York	1
	"Soñador"	Javier Vargas	KCSO–Sacramento	
	"Una canción"	Yari Moré	KMEX-TV–Los Angeles	

== At the OTI Festival ==
On 29 October 1983, the OTI Festival was held at the DAR Constitution Hall in Washington, D.C., United States, hosted by SIN, and broadcast live throughout Ibero-America. Javier Vargas performed "Soñador" in position 21, with Daniel Freiberg conducting the event's orchestra. At the end, only the top five places were announced, and the entry was one of them.

=== Voting ===
Each participating broadcaster, or group of broadcasters that jointly participated representing a country, appointed a juror who secretly scored each entry in a scale of 5–1 points, except for the entry representing its own country. The juror representing the United States was Luis de Llano.
