= Screen Global Production =

Directory of media production services companies

- Editor: Gabriella Geisinger
- Categories: Data Publishing
- Publisher: Media Business Insight
- First issue: Print Directory published in 1956
- Company: Media Business Insight
- Country: United Kingdom
- Language: British English
- Website: www.screenglobalproduction.com/

Screen Global Production (formerly KFTV.com and Kemps Film and TV Production Services Handbook) is an online resource where users can search for film, television and commercial production services companies worldwide. Users can browse for services within many categories, including; Production companies, SFX, Props & Wardrobe, Post Production, Stages & Studio, Equipment Rental, Crew & Support Services, Equipment Manufacture & Sale, Crew, Location Services, Broadcasting Facilities.

Their website also includes country guides and regular news articles.

KFTV.com is owned by Media Business Insight (MBI). Kemps was first published as a directory, Kemps Film, Television and Commercial Production Services Handbook, in 1956, The original Kemps website was launched in 1998. The name was changed from Kemps to KFTV.com (which is an abbreviation of Kemps, Film, TV and Video) in December 2012, following a redesign and update of their website.

In February 2025, the company was rebranded into Screen Global Production.
