= Conversa em Família =

- Country of origin: Portugal
- Original language: Portuguese

Production
- Production locations: Lisbon, Portugal

Original release
- Network: I Programa
- Release: 8 January 1969 – 28 March 1974

Conversa em Família was a Portuguese political commentary program aired on RTP from January 8, 1969, to March 28, 1974, for a total of sixteen editions. The program was presented by Marcelo Caetano.

The purpose of the program was to communicate the latest governmental developments at a time when the Estado Novo regime was facing a crisis, while showing the policies for Portugal's future. Its first edition, on January 8, 1969, came three and a half months after he became prime minister; being dedicated to the topic of financial and economic problems, a complex topic which Marcelo Caetano explained in an easier to understand language, related to the 1969 state budget. The usage of television marked an improvement to Salazar's usage of the mass media to broadcast his speeches, given that he only used radio for that end.

The final edition was dedicated to the failed fall of the regime in Caldas on March 16, 1974, considering it as a "sad military episode".

RTP acquired its first teleprompter, which was reserved specifically for the program, with the prime minister as its beneficiary. The program was initially directed by Hélder Mendes, later replaced by Ramiro Valadão, and finally, Alfredo Tropa.
