= Júlio Dantas =

Portuguese writer, politician and doctor

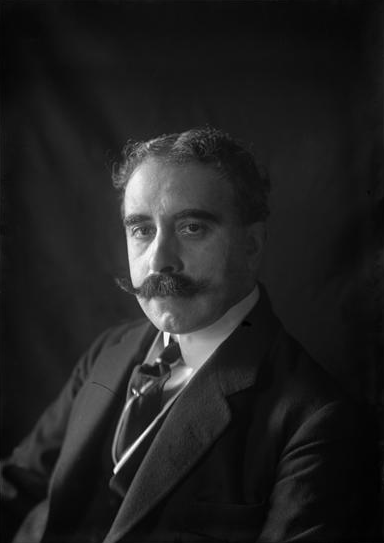
- Born: 19 May 1876; Lagos, Portugal
- Died: 25 May 1962 (aged 86); Lisbon, Portugal
- Occupations: Doctor, poet, journalist, politician, diplomat and playwright
- Writing career
- Genre: Poetry
- Notable work: A Ceia dos Cardeais
- Literary movement: Romanticism, Academism

Júlio Dantas, GCC (1876 – 25 May 1962) was a Portuguese doctor, poet, journalist, politician, diplomat and playwright.

== Biography ==
=== Writing career ===
In 1902, Dantas published the one-act verse play A Ceia dos Cardeais (The Dinner of the Cardinals). In 1907, his one-act play Rosas de Todo o Ano (Roses all the Year) had its premiere in Lisbon. It was later translated into English by A. F. d'Almeida Carvalho and Mrs. Edward Lewis, and its 1912 Royal Court Theatre debut was the first time a play translated from Portuguese had been performed in London.

In 1931, one of his plays was adapted for the screen as A Severa: it was one of the earliest sound films in Portuguese cinema. In 1947, he published the play Frei António das Chagas about a Portuguese soldier's conversion to becoming a mystic.

Dantas was a friend of the politician Vitorino Guimarães, having dedicated the poem "A minha boneca" ("My Doll") to his daughter Elina Guimarães during her childhood.

=== Political and diplomatic career ===
Following the Bloody Night in October 1921 and Francisco Cunha Leal's appointment as prime minister, Dantas began serving as Minister of Foreign Affairs on 16 December 1921. With the collapse of António Maria da Silva's cabinet on 30 October 1923, António Ginestal Machado was made prime minister and Dantas was again appointed Minister of Foreign Affairs on 15 November that year. He also served as Minister of Education.

During this period, the First Portuguese Republic, he served as president of the Nationalist Republican Party. He later served as a delegate to the League of Nations.

=== Other work ===
In 1936, Dantas was a founding member of the Portuguese Academy of History, which was created by the Estado Novo dictatorship as a way to instill a collective cultural history and memory in the country. In 1954, he headed a government commission to celebrate the centenary of Almeida Garrett's death.

Dantas served as president of the Lisbon Academy of Sciences.

=== Personal life ===
Dantas died on 25 May 1962 at the age of 86.

== Legacy ==
According to Ronald Hilton, Dantas had established himself as the dominant figure of the Portuguese literary scene in the early twentieth century. However, his influence on younger generations of writers began to wane as he was considered "old-fashioned". In 1916, Dantas came under attack from Futurist artist and writer Almada Negreiros through his Manifesto Anti-Dantas, which employed a radical critique of contemporary Portuguese culture. Ignacio Infante wrote that Dantas was seen to represent an "older reactionary condition" which was keeping the Portuguese people in an alleged state of "cultural degradation".

== Selected works by Dantas ==
=== Dramatic works ===
==== Theatre ====
- A Ceia dos Cardeais (The Dinner of the Cardinals; 1902)
- Rosas de Todo o Ano (Roses all the Year; premiered in 1907)
- Frei António das Chagas (1947)
