= Julio Sabala =

Dominican impersonator, comedian, singer and actor

Julio César Sabala De Jesús (born in Santo Domingo, Dominican Republic), better known as Julio Sabala, is a Dominican impersonator, comedian, singer, and actor who has been on the air for more than 30 years doing comedy and diverse entertainment forms. As a singer, he represented the Dominican Republic at the OTI Festival 1987 with the song "Esto tiene que cambiar".

== Early life ==
Sabala used to work in a circus named El Circo De Los Muchachos (The Boys' Circus). He also worked in the films Contigo (1988), Encantada de la vida (1993) and Ven al Paralelo (1992).
