= Teatro São Luiz =

Theatre in Lisbon, Portugal

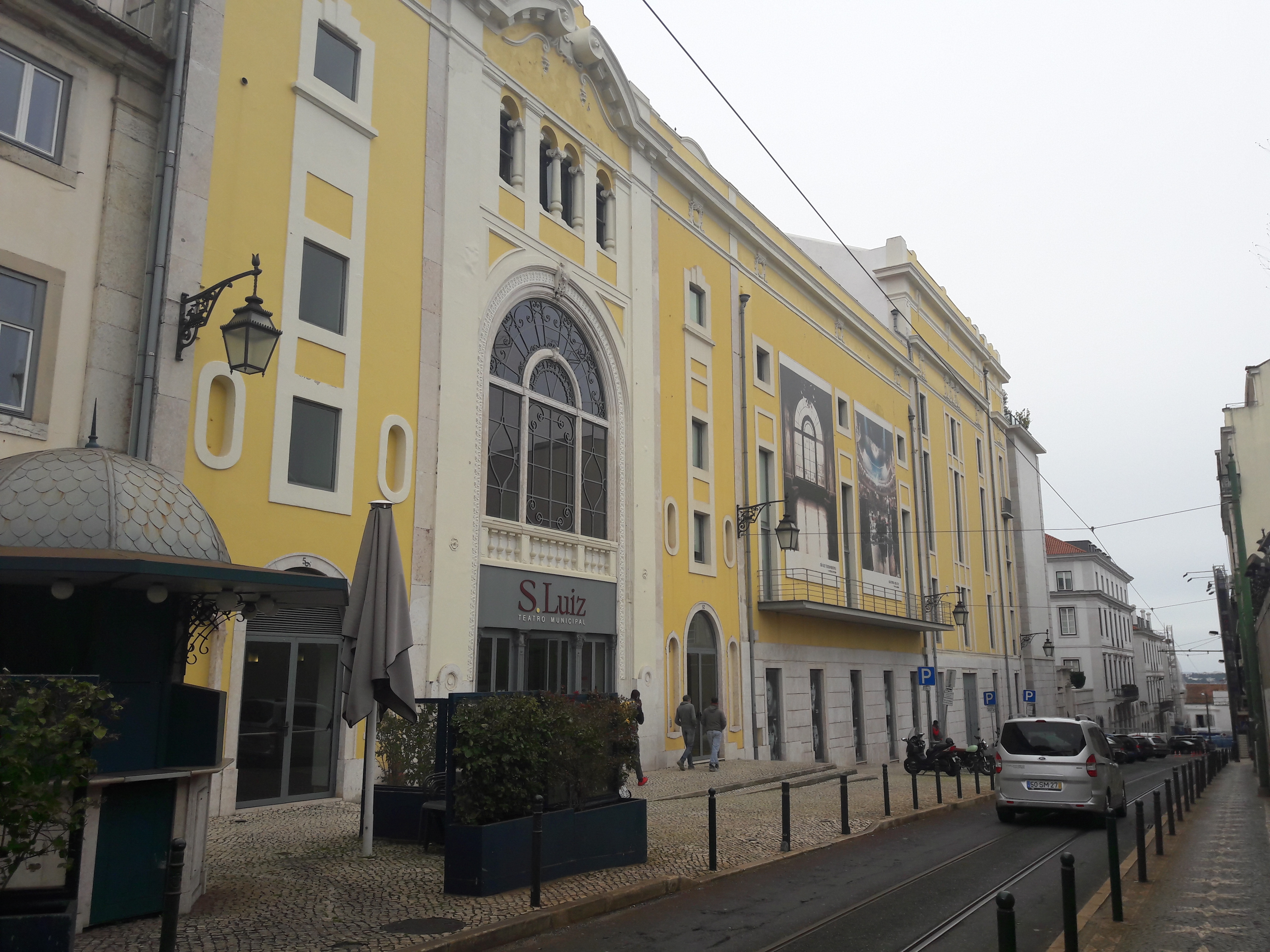
- Interactive map of Teatro São Luiz
- Address: Rua António Maria Cardoso; Lisbon; Portugal
- Coordinates: 38°42′33″N 09°08′32″W
- Owner: Lisbon City Council

Construction
- Opened: 22 May 1894; reopened November 2002
- Architect: Louis Reynaud

The Teatro São Luiz is a theatre located in the Chiado district of the Portuguese capital of Lisbon. It opened on 22 May 1894.

== Early history ==
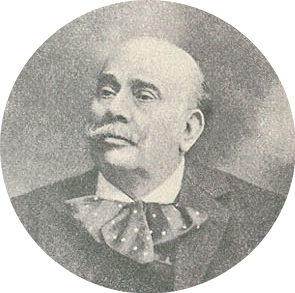
Luís de Braga Júnior, Viscount of São Luiz de Braga

Teatro Municipal de São Luiz was the idea of the Portuguese actor, Guilherme da Silveira, who became its first technical director. He persuaded several investors to fund the new theatre, led by Luís de Braga Júnior, the Viscount of São Luiz de Braga. The French architect Louis Reynaud was contracted to design the theatre, giving it a "Parisian" style. Interior decorations included a fresco by the Italian set designer, Luigi Manini. The theatre was originally named the Teatro Dona Amélia, after the then Queen of Portugal and the Queen and King Carlos attended the official opening on 22 May 1894, their eighth wedding anniversary. The first performance was Offenbach's comic operetta, The Drum Major’s Daughter.

The theatre quickly became an important cultural and artistic centre of the elite of Lisbon. It attracted many famous European actors including Sarah Bernhardt (1899), Eleonora Duse (1898), Coquelin Cadet, Gabrielle Réjane, and Jeanne Julia Bartet (1902), as well as the actor and director André Antoine, creator of Théâtre Libre. The Teatro Dona Amélia also housed a cinematograph, installed in 1896, that showed short films, among them the earliest films shot in Portugal, during the intervals and at the end of plays. It also hosted carnival balls, choral music, and many lunches. In 1898, the theatre group of Augusto Rosa and Eduardo Brazão took up residence and attracted many of the most famous Portuguese actors to the theatre, including Adelina Abranches, Palmira Bastos, António Pinheiro, Chaby Pinheiro, Emília Cândida, and Actor Taborda. Bastos would give her final performance at the São Luiz, at the age of 91.

In 1910, following the overthrow of the monarchy, the Viscount renamed it Teatro da República. In September 1914 a fire completely destroyed the theatre, a fate that befell several theatres in Lisbon. It was speedily rebuilt to the original design, and was reopened on 16 January 1916 with a performance of Os Posticos by Eduardo Schwalbach Lucci, with President Machado in attendance. The same year witnessed the debut in the theatre of the popular Portuguese actor, Amélia Rey Colaço. In the following year Almada Negreiros read his “Futurist Ultimatum” to a scandalized audience that included the famous Portuguese poet, Fernando Pessoa.

== Conversion to cinema ==
The Viscount of São Luiz de Braga died in 1918 and in his honour the theatre was then renamed as the Teatro São Luiz. In 1928 it was remodelled to enable film projection, with the first film to be shown being Metropolis, directed by Fritz Lang and accompanied by a 15-piece band. Further changes were made in 1930, and it became the first sound film cinema in Portugal, with the first film to be shown being Prix de Beauté. The first Portuguese sound film, A Severa, by José Leitão de Barros, was screened on 18 June 1931. From 1960 the São Luiz started to lose popularity as a cinema, leading to an unsuccessful attempt to return it to live theatre.

== Purchase by Lisbon Council ==
In 1971, the theatre was bought by Lisbon City Council, and its name was changed to Teatro Municipal de São Luiz. The new resident company had Luiz Francisco Rebello as Director, and included Eunice Muñoz among the actors. On 24 October 1987, the theatre hosted the OTI Festival 1987. In 1990 the Council contracted with the Companhia Teatral do Chiado (Theatre Company of Chiado) and Mário Viegas to operate the theatre. In 1998, major remodelling and expansion began. This involved the restoration of the main theatre, the remodelling of the stage and back-stage areas, and the creation of a studio room, a café-concert and a restaurant. Following completion of the work the theatre re-opened with the musical Amália, by Filipe La Féria. In July 2016, the main theatre was named after the Portuguese actor Luís Miguel Cintra.

In January 2008, Teatro São Luiz premiered Evil Machines, a musical play written by the Monty Python team member Terry Jones. This was based on his book, with original music by Portuguese composer Luis Tinoco.

== See also ==
- List of theatres and auditoriums in Lisbon
