= Antonio Vodanovic =

Chilean television presenter (born 1949)

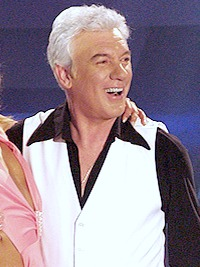
Antonio Vodanovic

Antonio Vodanovic (born March 2, 1949, Santiago, Chile) is a Chilean television presenter known for being the presenter of Viña del Mar International Song Festival from 1976 to 2004.

From the late 1970s to 1982 he was programming director of Televisión Nacional de Chile. In 1982 he renounced that position after an internal conflict in Televisión Nacional de Chile that emerged in the aftermath as consequence of the censorship of Holocaust. On one occasion Vodanovic publicly praised dictator Augusto Pinochet and his wife Lucia Hiriart, who were in the public, on behalf of "the Chilean youth". Vodanovic was present in the Acto de Chacarillas in 1977, a ritualized pro-Pinochet act reminiscent of Francoist Spain.
