= KFTV-DT =

Television station in Hanford, California

- Hanford–Fresno, California; United States
- City: Hanford, California
- Channels: Digital: 21 (UHF); Virtual: 21
- Branding: Univision 21; Noticias 21

Programming
- Affiliations: 21.1: Univision; 21.6: UniMás (KTFF-DT); for others, see § Subchannels

Ownership
- Owner: TelevisaUnivision; (KFTV License Partnership, G.P.)
- Sister stations: KTFF-DT

History
- First air date: September 20, 1972
- Former call signs: KFTV (1972–2009)
- Former channel numbers: Analog: 21 (UHF, 1972–2009); Digital: 20 (UHF, until 2020)
- Former affiliations: SIN (1972–1987)
- Call sign meaning: Fresno Television

Technical information
- Licensing authority: FCC
- Facility ID: 34439
- ERP: 316 kW
- HAAT: 610 m (2,001 ft)
- Transmitter coordinates: 37°4′22″N 119°25′53″W
- Translator(s): KTFF-DT 61.2 Porterville

Links
- Public license information: Public file; LMS
- Website: univisionfresno.com

KFTV-DT (channel 21) is a television station licensed to Hanford, California, United States, broadcasting the Spanish-language Univision network to the Fresno area. It is owned and operated by TelevisaUnivision alongside Porterville-licensed UniMás outlet KTFF-DT (channel 61). The two stations share studios at the Univision Fresno Broadcast Center on Univision Plaza near the corner of North Palm and West Herndon avenues in northwestern Fresno; KFTV-DT's transmitter is located on Blue Ridge in rural northwestern Tulare County.

== History ==
KFTV has existed in its current form since 1972; however, its license predates Spanish-language television in the Fresno market by more than a decade, having seen two separate attempts to launch an independent station in the Hanford area before being sold and relaunched.

=== Early years ===
Gann Television Enterprises, a limited partnership of Harold D. Gann, Louis Maccagno and George L. Naron, filed for a construction permit to build a new TV station on channel 21 in Hanford on October 31, 1960; the application was granted on March 29, 1961. Before signing on, Maccagno was replaced by C. B. Stewart. From a transmitter site at Lakeside Park, where Highway 99 crosses the Kings River, KDAS, an independent station, went on air under special temporary authority on December 20, 1961. The "Local Hometown TV" station offered a variety of locally produced programs, including news, sports and church services.

The joint partnership of Gann, Stewart and Naron ended in discordant fashion. In late November, the other two partners filed a suit against Gann asking for the dissolution of the partnership, alleging that Gann's conduct had caused the resignation of a number of employees and that resultant turnover had left the station in a "technical and engineering turmoil". The station was transferred to a new partnership run by Naron and Sweeney in June 1963 and remained operational for another 18 months; channel 21 received authority to go silent from the Federal Communications Commission (FCC) on December 23, 1964.

In January 1965, the sale of KDAS to car dealer Harvey F. Himes and Cy Newman, both of Fresno, was announced; the new owners announced plans to change the call sign to KSJV-TV, for "San Joaquin Valley", and relocate the transmitter to a mountaintop site. In addition, the station would be affiliated with a proposed television network known as the Unisphere Broadcasting System. The sale was not filed with the FCC until November, and it was not until February 1966 when the transaction was approved and the new call letters adopted. On February 10, channel 21 returned to the air, with its inaugural program being an hour of live entertainment from the Hanford studios in the Civic Center Building. It lasted just over three months. On May 14, Cy Newman announced the station would go off the air after the next day's programming for new equipment and technical changes, an outage slated to last three weeks. The former studio area in the Civic Center Building was used by Kings County to house the probation department.

On December 8, 1967, the FCC moved to delete the channel 21 permit for failure to prosecute; KSJV Television, Inc., challenged the decision, and its petition for reconsideration was granted in April 1968.

=== As a Spanish-language station ===
Former logo, used until December 31, 2012.

The reason that KSJV had staved off deletion was because Newman had found a buyer: the Spanish International Network, which at the time owned just two operating stations, in San Antonio and Los Angeles. In the sale, Newman noted that his group had lost over $100,000 since returning to air as KSJV-TV in 1966. The FCC granted the sale in March 1969, but SIBC did not immediately return channel 21—now bearing new KFTV call letters—to air, as it filed to move the transmitter to Black Mountain.

It was not until September 20, 1972, that KFTV returned to air, the three weeks having turned into more than six years. Operated initially as a satellite of KMEX in Los Angeles and with Danny Villanueva as its first general manager, ground was broken in February 1973 for a new Hanford studio complex, which opened on April 30.

In December 1977, SIN began distributing its programming by satellite to KFTV. In 1985, studio operations moved from Hanford to a new facility on Ashlan Avenue in Fresno. KFTV and sister station KTFF-DT, acquired in 2003, relocated from the Ashlan Avenue facility to a larger site on Herndon Avenue, which also houses the Univision Radio cluster in the market, in 2008.

== News operation ==
Shortly after building its Hanford studios, KFTV began producing local newscasts. The station's first news anchor, Pedro Santos, was the longest-tenured in Fresno when he took a job as public relations director for KFTV in 1994.

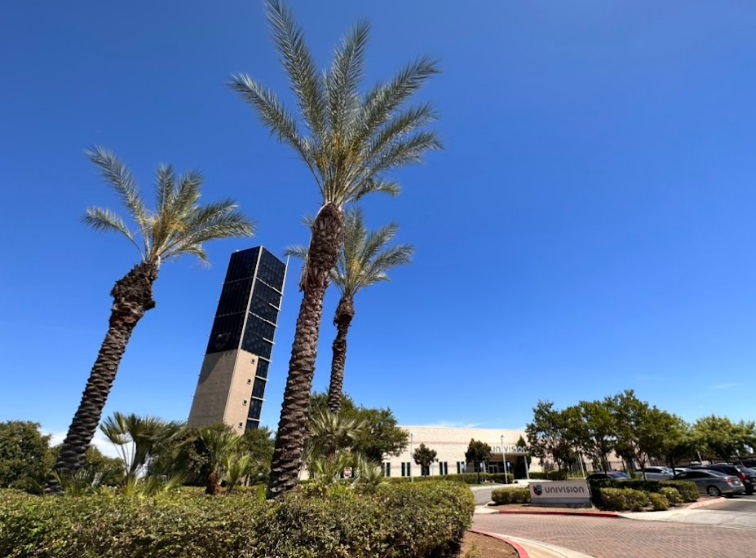
Univision KFTV Channel 21's modern studio and office space in Northern Fresno

KFTV-DT presently broadcasts seven hours of locally produced newscasts each week (with one hour each on weekdays, Saturdays and Sundays); in addition, the station produces the public affairs program Arriba Valle Central, which airs weekday mornings from 5 to 7 a.m. After producing a dinner-hour local newscast since 1973, KFTV launched Arriba Valle Central in 1990 and a late local news program in 1996. Weekend newscasts were instituted in 2004.

== Technical information ==
=== Subchannels ===
The station's signal is multiplexed:

Subchannels of KFTV-DT
Subchannel	Res.	Short name	Programming
21.1	720p	KFTV-DT	Univision
21.2	480i	getTV	Great (4:3)
21.3	480i	LAFF	Laff
21.4	480i	Confess	Confess
21.5	480i	CRIME	True Crime Network
21.6	720p	Unimas	UniMás (KTFF-DT)

Subchannel broadcast with MPEG-4 video
Simulcast of subchannels of another station

=== Analog-to-digital conversion ===
KFTV shut down its analog signal, over UHF channel 21, on June 12, 2009, the official date on which full-power television stations in the United States transitioned from analog to digital broadcasts under federal mandate. The station's digital signal remained on its pre-transition UHF channel 20, using virtual channel 21.

=== Spectrum auction repack ===
KFTV was one of nearly 1,000 television stations in the United States that had to change their digital channel allocation in the spectrum auction repack in 2019–2020. KFTV reallocated to UHF channel 21 in phase ten of the repack.
