= Chile in the OTI Festival 1994 =

- OTI Festival 1994
- Participating broadcasters: Televisión Nacional de Chile (TVN); Corporación de Televisión de la Universidad Católica de Chile (UCTV); Red de Televisión Chilevisión (CHV); Compañía Chilena de Televisión (CCT); Red Televisiva Megavisión
- Country: Chile
- Selection process: Una canción chilena para Iberoamérica
- Selection date: 17 September 1994

Competing entry
- Song: "La vida va"
- Artist: María Inés Naveillán
- Songwriter: Luis "Poncho" Venegas

Placement
- Semi-final result: Qualified
- Final result: 9th, 3 points

Participation chronology
◄1993 •	1994	• 1995►

Chile was represented at the OTI Festival 1994 with the song "La vida va", written by Luis "Poncho" Venegas, and performed by María Inés Naveillán. The Chilean participating broadcasters, Televisión Nacional de Chile (TVN), Corporación de Televisión de la Universidad Católica de Chile (UCTV), Red de Televisión Chilevisión (CHV), Compañía Chilena de Televisión (CCT), and Red Televisiva Megavisión, selected their entry through a national televised final titled Una canción chilena para Iberoamérica. The song, qualified from the semi-final, placed ninth in the final, tying with 3 points with the entry from Cuba.

== National stage ==
Televisión Nacional de Chile (TVN), Corporación de Televisión de la Universidad Católica de Chile (UCTV), Red de Televisión Chilevisión (CHV), Compañía Chilena de Televisión (CCT), and Red Televisiva Megavisión, selected their entry for the 23rd edition of the OTI Festival through a six-song national televised final titled Una canción chilena para Iberoamérica staged and broadcast by Megavisión. The show was presented by Julio Videla.

Competing entries on Una canción chilena para Iberoamérica
Song	Artist	Songwriter(s)
"Como dos ríos"	Tita Parra	Isabel Parra
"Cuando suenan las campanas"	Gipsy Romero	Tito Fernández
"Nada quedará"	La Sociedad	Daniel Guerrero; Pablo Castro
"Sortilegio"	Claudio Guzmán	Claudio Guzmán
"Una forma de ser"	Paula Bascuñán	Juan Antonio Labra
"La vida va"	María Inés Naveillán	Luis "Poncho" Venegas

=== Final ===
The national final was held on Saturday 17 September 1994, beginning at 21:30 CLT (01:30+1 UTC). The winner was "La vida va", written by Luis "Poncho" Venegas, and performed by María Inés Naveillán; with "Nada quedará", written by Daniel Guerrero and Pablo Castro, and performed by La Sociedad, placing second. The show ended with a reprise of the winning entry.

Winner

Result of Una canción chilena para Iberoamérica
R/O	Song	Artist	Result
	"Como dos ríos"	Tita Parra	
	"Cuando suenan las campanas"	Gipsy Romero	
	"Nada quedará"	La Sociedad	2
	"Sortilegio"	Claudio Guzmán	
	"Una forma de ser"	Paula Bascuñán	
	"La vida va"	María Inés Naveillán	1

== At the OTI Festival ==
On 14–15 October 1994, the OTI Festival was held at Teatro Principal in Valencia, Spain, hosted by Televisión Española (TVE), and broadcast live throughout Ibero-America. María Inés Naveillán performed "La vida va" in position 10 in the semi-final, qualifying for the final. At the end, the song placed ninth in the final, tying with 3 points with the entry from Cuba.
