= Chile in the OTI Festival 1995 =

- OTI Festival 1995
- Participating broadcasters: Televisión Nacional de Chile (TVN); Corporación de Televisión de la Universidad Católica de Chile (UCTV); Red de Televisión Chilevisión (CHV); Compañía Chilena de Televisión (CCT); Red Televisiva Megavisión
- Country: Chile
- Selection process: Chile busca una canción
- Selection date: 21 August 1995

Competing entry
- Song: "Canción contra la tristeza"
- Artist: Alberto Plaza
- Songwriter: Alberto Plaza

Placement
- Final result: 2nd

Participation chronology
◄1994 •	1995	• 1996►

Chile was represented at the OTI Festival 1995 with the song "Canción contra la tristeza", written and performed by Alberto Plaza. The Chilean participating broadcasters, Televisión Nacional de Chile (TVN), Corporación de Televisión de la Universidad Católica de Chile (UCTV), Red de Televisión Chilevisión (CHV), Compañía Chilena de Televisión (CCT), and Red Televisiva Megavisión, selected their entry through a national televised competition titled Chile busca una canción. The song, that was performed in position 19, placed second out of 24 competing entries.

== National stage ==
Televisión Nacional de Chile (TVN), Corporación de Televisión de la Universidad Católica de Chile (UCTV), Red de Televisión Chilevisión (CHV), Compañía Chilena de Televisión (CCT), and Red Televisiva Megavisión, selected their entry for the 24th edition of the OTI Festival through a six-song national televised competition titled Chile busca una canción staged and broadcast by UCTV on Canal 13. The competition, that consisted in a semi-final and a final, was presented by José Alfredo Fuentes, Angélica Castro, and Kike Morandé.

The organizers opened a song submission period to which the finalists of the 23 previous editions of the Chilean OTI national final were invited, as well as the first, second, and third finalists of the 35 editions of the Viña del Mar International Song Festival. Of the 57 songs received, six were shortlisted for the televised competition by the organizing committee that was formed, among others, of a representative from each of the five broadcasters, two representatives from the Asociación de Periodistas de Espectáculos, and two representatives from the Sociedad Chilena del Derecho de Autor. (Note: These included Gonzalo Bertrán, Horacio Saavedra, Jorge Saint-Jean, and Ana Rosa Romo.)

Competing entries on Chile busca una canción
Song	Artist	Songwriter(s)
"A Rapa Nui"	Julio Zegers and Eduardo Gatti	Julio Zegers
"Canción contra la tristeza"	Alberto Plaza	Alberto Plaza
"Dame un beso"	Keko Yunge	Keko Yunge
"Pensarlo dos veces"	Fernando de Jesús	Tatiana Bustos; Juan Carlos Ossandón
"Te quiero más, te necesito más"	Eduardo Fuentes	René Calderón; Tito Astete
"Yo te confieso"	Fernando Casas	Scottie Scott

=== Semi-final ===
A semi-final was held on Monday 14 August 1995.

Qualifier

Result of the semi-final of Chile busca una canción
R/O	Song	Artist	Result
	"A Rapa Nui"	Julio Zegers and Eduardo Gatti	—N/a
	"Canción contra la tristeza"	Alberto Plaza	Qualified
	"Dame un beso"	Keko Yunge	—N/a
	"Pensarlo dos veces"	Fernando de Jesús	Qualified
	"Te quiero más, te necesito más"	Eduardo Fuentes	—N/a
	"Yo te confieso"	Fernando Casas	Qualified

=== Final ===
The final was held on Monday 21 August 1995. The show featured guest performances by singer Pablo Herrera, mime artist César Aedo, and comedians Mc Phanton and Álvaro Salas. The president of the jury was Raúl Matas.

The winner was "Canción contra la tristeza", written and performed by Alberto Plaza; with "Yo te confieso", written by Scottie Scott and performed by Fernando Casas, placing second; and "Pensarlo dos veces", written by Tatiana Bustos and Juan Carlos Ossandón, and performed by Fernando de Jesús, placing third. The show ended with a reprise of the winning entry.

Winner

Result of the final of Chile busca una canción
R/O	Song	Artist	Result
	"Canción contra la tristeza"	Alberto Plaza	1
	"Pensarlo dos veces"	Fernando de Jesús	3
	"Yo te confieso"	Fernando Casas	2

== At the OTI Festival ==
On 11 November 1995, the OTI Festival was held at the Anfiteatro José Asunción Flores in San Bernardino, Paraguay, hosted by Teledifusora Paraguaya, and broadcast live throughout Ibero-America. Alberto Plaza performed "Canción contra la tristeza" in position 19, with Roberto Trujillo Sidiela conducting the event's orchestra. The song placed second out of 24 competing entries.
