= OTI Festival 1995 =

24th OTI Song Festival

Date and venue
- Final: 11 November 1995
- Venue: Anfiteatro José Asunción Flores; San Bernardino, Paraguay

Organization
- Organizer: Organización de Televisión Iberoamericana (OTI)
- Supervisor: Darío de la Peña
- Host broadcaster: Teledifusora Paraguaya
- Musical director: Oscar Cardozo Ocampo
- Presenters: Menchi Barriocanal; Rubén Rodríguez

Participants
- Number of entries: 24
- Returning countries: Canada
- Non-returning countries: Netherlands Antilles
- Participation map: Participating countries Countries that participated in the past but not in 1995

Vote
- Voting system: The members of a single jury selected their favourite songs in a secret vote
- Winning song: Spain "Eres mi debilidad"

The OTI Festival 1995 (Spanish: Vigésimo Cuarto Gran Premio de la Canción Iberoamericana, Portuguese: Vigésimo Quarto Grande Prêmio da Canção Ibero-Americana) was the 24th edition of the OTI Festival, held on 11 November 1995 at Anfiteatro José Asunción Flores in San Bernardino, Paraguay, and presented by Menchi Barriocanal and Rubén Rodríguez. It was organised by the Organización de Televisión Iberoamericana (OTI) and host broadcaster Teledifusora Paraguaya.

Broadcasters from twenty-four countries participated in the festival. The winner was the song "Eres mi debilidad", written by Alejandro Abad, and performed by Marcos Llunas representing Spain; with "Canción contra la tristeza", written and performed by Alberto Plaza representing Chile, placing second; and "Hoy que no estás", written by Carlos Miguel Ojeda, and performed by Cristina Rebull representing Cuba, placing third.

== Location ==
The Organización de Televisión Iberoamericana (OTI) designated Teledifusora Paraguaya as the host broadcaster for the 24th edition of the OTI Festival. The broadcaster staged the event in San Bernardino. The venue selected was Anfiteatro José Asunción Flores, an open-air venue opened in 1992 with a capacity for 20,614 people, used for social events, festivals and concerts, located at the slopes of the Andes mountain range. This was the first time the festival was held outdoors.

On 9 November 1995, the participating artists were received by the president of the country Juan Carlos Wasmosy.

== Participants ==
Broadcasters from twenty-four countries participated in this edition of the OTI festival. The OTI members, public or private broadcasters from Spain, Portugal, and twenty-two Spanish and Portuguese speaking countries of Ibero-America signed up for the festival. From the countries that participated in the previous edition, only Netherlands Antilles was absent, with Canada returning after missing that festival.

Some of the participating broadcasters, such as those representing Chile, Cuba, Ecuador, and the United States, selected their entries through their regular national televised competitions. Other broadcasters decided to select their entry internally.

Four performing artists had previously represented the same country in previous editions: Rolando Percy had represented Paraguay in 1978 and 1990, Carlos Brizzio had represented Honduras in 1984, Martha Baltodano had represented Niracagua in 1991, and Tony Cheng had represented Panama in 1993.

Participants of the OTI Festival 1995
Country	Broadcaster(s)	Song	Artist	Songwriter(s)	Language	Conductor
Argentina		"Si se pierden las canciones"	Inés Rinaldi y Fernando Porta	Francisco Bagala; Fernando Porta	Spanish	Oscar Cardozo Ocampo
Bolivia		"Adiós mi tierra"	Denise Rivera	Denise Rivera; Fernando Sancho; José Fernández	Spanish	Fernando Sancho
Brazil		"Aonde está você"	Beto Surian	Beto Surian	Portuguese	Oscar Cardozo Ocampo
Canada		"Quiéreme"	Mariela Torres	Jorge González	Spanish	Oscar Cardozo Ocampo
Chile	TVN; UCTV; CHV; CCT; Megavisión	"Canción contra la tristeza"	Alberto Plaza	Alberto Plaza	Spanish	Roberto Trujillo Sidiela
Colombia		"Sólo por hoy"	César Mora	César Mora	Spanish	Milton Salcedo
Costa Rica		"El buen Felipe"	Rafael F. Dubón	Rafael F. Dubón	Spanish	Carlos Guzmán Bermúdez
Cuba	ICRT	"Hoy que no estás"	Cristina Rebull	Carlos Miguel Ojeda	Spanish	Oscar Cardozo Ocampo
Dominican Republic		"Un solar en la luna"	Manuel Jiménez	Manuel Jiménez	Spanish	Manuel Tejada
Ecuador	ACTVE	"Mira"	Tierrabuena	Fernando Proaño	Spanish	Claudio Jácome Harb
El Salvador	TCS	"Ven aquí conmigo"	Matices	Ángel Ortiz; Juan Bolaños; Héctor Rodas	Spanish	Oscar Cardozo Ocampo
Guatemala		"Siéntelo"	Mario Mejía	Nelson Leal	Spanish	Roberto Estrada
Honduras		"La casa de Pablo"	Carlos Brizzio	Carlos Brizzio	Spanish	Oscar Cardozo Ocampo
Mexico	Televisa	"Cantos distintos"	Sayeg	Sayeg	Spanish	Alberto Núñez Palacios
Nicaragua		"Esa mirada"	Martha Baltodano	Manuel Ignacio Lacayo; César Prado; Peter Vivas	Spanish	César Prado
Panama		"Has hecho trampa"	Tony Cheng	Augusto César Esucdero	Spanish	Oscar Cardozo Ocampo
Paraguay	Teledifusora Paraguaya	"Por siempre América"	Rolando Percy	Rolando Percy; Jorge Villalba	Spanish	Palito Miranda
Peru		"Brillo en la piel"	Julio Andrade	Julio Andrade	Spanish	Carlos Wong
Portugal	RTP	"Vê lá bem"	Pedro Migueis	Nuno Gomes dos Santos; Jan Van Dijck	Portuguese	Ramón Galarza
Puerto Rico	Telemundo Puerto Rico	"Latinoamericano"	Carlos Alberto Fortuño	Antonio Ramía Pérez	Spanish	Ramón Sánchez
Spain	TVE	"Eres mi debilidad"	Marcos Llunas	Alejandro Abad	Spanish	Javier Capella Sanz
United States	Univision	"Secreto de amor"	Silvia Bezi	José Villarreal	Spanish	Roy Velásquez
Uruguay	Sociedad Televisora Larrañaga	"Un mundo mejor"	Pájaro Canzani	Pájaro Canzani	Spanish	Julio Frade
Venezuela		"El viaje"	Rogelio Ortiz	Simón Díaz	Spanish	Alí Agüero

== Festival overview ==
The festival was held on Saturday 11 November 1995, beginning at 21:00 PYST (00:00+1 UTC). It was presented by Menchi Barriocanal and Rubén Rodríguez. The musical director was Oscar Cardozo Ocampo, who conducted the orchestra when required.

The winner was the song "Eres mi debilidad", written by Alejandro Abad, and performed by Marcos Llunas representing Spain; with "Canción contra la tristeza", written and performed by Alberto Plaza representing Chile, placing second; and "Hoy que no estás", written by Carlos Miguel Ojeda, and performed by Cristina Rebull representing Cuba, placing third. The first prize was endowed with a monetary amount of US$30,000, the second prize of US$20,000, and the third prize of US$10,000. The festival ended with a reprise of the winning entry.

Winner

Results of the OTI Festival 1995
R/O	Country	Song	Artist	Place
1	Peru	"Brillo en la piel"	Julio Andrade	—N/a
2	Colombia	"Sólo por hoy"	César Mora	—N/a
3	Bolivia	"Adiós mi tierra"	Denise Rivera	—N/a
4	Uruguay	"Un mundo mejor"	Pájaro Canzani	—N/a
5	Portugal	"Vê lá bem"	Pedro Migueis	—N/a
6	Venezuela	"El viaje"	Rogelio Ortiz	—N/a
7	Dominican Republic	"Un solar en la luna"	Manuel Jiménez	—N/a
8	United States	"Secreto de amor"	Silvia Bezi	—N/a
9	Honduras	"La casa de Pablo"	Carlos Brizzio	—N/a
10	Argentina	"Si se pierden las canciones"	Inés Rinaldi y Fernando Porta	—N/a
11	Mexico	"Cantos distintos"	Sayeg	—N/a
12	Ecuador	"Mira"	Tierrabuena	—N/a
13	Brazil	"Aonde está você"	Beto Surian	—N/a
14	Canada	"Quiéreme"	Mariela Torres	—N/a
15	Cuba	"Hoy que no estás"	Cristina Rebull	3
16	Puerto Rico	"Latinoamericano"	Carlos Alberto Fortuño	—N/a
17	Panama	"Has hecho trampa"	Tony Cheng	—N/a
18	Spain	"Eres mi debilidad"	Marcos Llunas	1
19	Chile	"Canción contra la tristeza"	Alberto Plaza	2
20	El Salvador	"Ven aquí conmigo"	Matices	—N/a
21	Nicaragua	"Esa mirada"	Martha Baltodano	—N/a
22	Guatemala	"Siéntelo"	Mario Mejía	—N/a
23	Costa Rica	"El buen Felipe"	Rafael F. Dubón	—N/a
24	Paraguay	"Por siempre América"	Rolando Percy	—N/a

=== Jury ===
The nine members of a single jury selected their favourite songs in a secret vote. Only the top three places were revealed. The voting was supervised by Darío de la Peña. The members of the jury were:

- Antonio Vodanovic – television host
- Manuel Mijares – singer
- Delia Fiallo – screenwriter
- Donatto – singer-songwriter
- Estéfano – singer-songwriter
- Daniela Mercury – singer-songwriter
- Francisco – singer, won the festival for Spain in 1981 and 1992
- Víctor Pecci – tennis player
- Luis Szarán – composer

== Broadcast ==
The festival was broadcast in the 24 participating countries where the corresponding OTI member broadcasters relayed the contest through their networks after receiving it live via satellite.

Known details on the broadcasts in each country, including the specific broadcasting stations and commentators are shown in the tables below.

Broadcasters and commentators in participating countries
Country	Broadcaster	Channel(s)	Commentator(s)	Ref.
Paraguay	Teledifusora Paraguaya	Canal 13		
Spain	TVE	La Primera (Note: Delayed broadcast on 12 November at 22:30 CET (21:30 UTC))	José Luis Uribarri	
United States	Univision (Note: Delayed broadcast later that day by all Univision affiliates, each in their own time zone.)			
