= OTI Festival 1988 =

17th OTI Song Festival

Date and venue
- Final: 19 November 1988
- Venue: Teatro Nacional Cervantes; Buenos Aires, Argentina

Organization
- Organizer: Organización de Televisión Iberoamericana (OTI)

Production
- Host broadcaster: Argentina Televisora Color (ATC)
- Director: Roberto O. Muñoz
- Musical director: Oscar Cardozo Ocampo
- Presenters: Pinky; Juan Alberto Badía

Participants
- Number of entries: 22
- Non-returning countries: Brazil; Canada
- Participation map: Participating countries Countries that participated in the past but not in 1988

Vote
- Voting system: Each member of a single jury awards 5–1 points to its five favourite songs in a secret vote
- Winning song: Argentina "Todavía eres mi mujer"

The OTI Festival 1988 (Spanish: Decimoséptimo Gran Premio de la Canción Iberoamericana, Portuguese: Décimo Sétimo Grande Prêmio da Canção Ibero-Americana) was the 17th edition of the OTI Festival, held on 19 November 1988 at the Teatro Nacional Cervantes in Buenos Aires, Argentina, and presented by Pinky and Juan Alberto Badía. It was organised by the Organización de Televisión Iberoamericana (OTI) and host broadcaster Argentina Televisora Color (ATC).

Broadcasters from twenty-two countries participated in the festival. The winner was the song "Todavía eres mi mujer", written by Carlos Castellón, and performed by Guillermo Guido representing Argentina; with "Un mundo diferente", written by Antonio Medina Boselli, and performed by Marco de Brix representing Paraguay, placing second; and "De tu boca", written by Juan Luis Guerra, and performed by Taty Salas representing the Dominican Republic, and "Partiré, buscaré", written by Jorge Tafur, and performed by Rocky Belmonte representing Peru, both placing third.

== Location ==
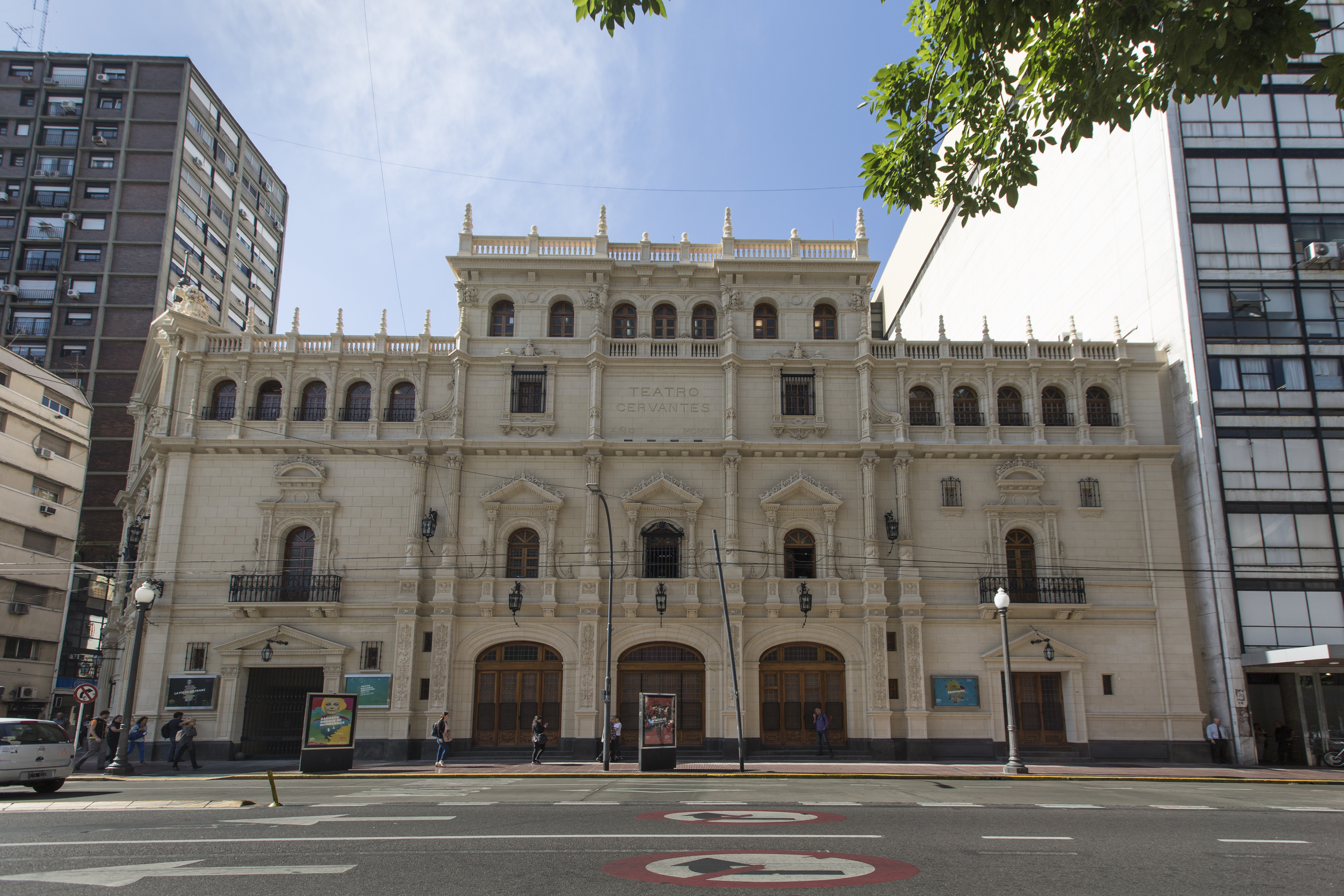
Teatro Nacional Cervantes, Buenos Aires – venue of the OTI Festival 1988.

The Organización de Televisión Iberoamericana (OTI) designated Argentina Televisora Color (ATC) as the host broadcaster for the 17th edition of the OTI Festival. The broadcaster staged the event in Buenos Aires. The venue selected was the Teatro Nacional Cervantes, which is the national stage and comedy theatre of the country. It was opened in 1921 and was designed by Fernando Aranda Arias and Emilio Repetto.

On 14 November 1988, a cocktail reception was held at Hotel Libertador upon the arrival of the delegations, attended by all the participating artists, executives from the participating broadcasters, OTI officials, and numerous accredited journalists.

== Participants ==
Broadcasters from twenty-two countries participated in this edition of the OTI festival. The OTI members, public or private broadcasters from Spain, Portugal, and twenty Spanish and Portuguese speaking countries of Ibero-America signed up for the festival. From the countries that participated in the previous edition, Brazil and Canada did not return.

Some of the participating broadcasters, such as those representing Argentina, Chile, Mexico, and the United States, selected their entries through their regular national televised competitions. Other broadcasters decided to select their entry internally.

Three performing artists had represented the same country previously: Ced Ride had represented the Netherlands Antilles in 1977, Marco de Brix had represented Paraguay in 1983, and Paulette had represented Panama in 1986.

Participants of the OTI Festival 1988
| Country | Broadcaster(s) | Song | Artist | Songwriter(s) | Language | Conductor |
|---|---|---|---|---|---|---|
| Argentina | ATC | "Todavía eres mi mujer" | Guillermo Guido | Carlos Castellón | Spanish | Oscar Cardozo Ocampo |
| Bolivia | | "Sólo un despertar" | Mimi | Nicolás Suárez Eyzaguirre | Spanish | Nicolás Suárez Eyzaguirre |
| Chile | TVN; UCTV; UTV | "Es mi libertad" | Cecilia Castro | Loreto Valenzuela Baudrand; Alfredo Sauvalle | Spanish | Miguel Pizarro |
| Colombia | Caracol Televisión; PUNCH; RTI; RCN; JES; Datos y Mensajes | "Latinoamérica" | Harold Orozco | Harold Orozco | Spanish | Jaime Rodríguez |
| Costa Rica | Univisión de Costa Rica | "Hoy le canto al mundo" | Frank Victory | Frank Victory; Ricardo Sáenz | Spanish | Rodrigo Sáenz |
| Dominican Republic | | "De tu boca" | Taty Salas | Juan Luis Guerra | Spanish | Manuel Tejada |
| Ecuador | | "Juan Cansino" | Ketty Pazmiño | Ramiro Montalvo | Spanish | Ramiro Montalvo |
| El Salvador | TCS | "No está bien" | Walter Artiga | Walter Artiga | Spanish | Oscar Cardozo Ocampo |
| Guatemala | | "Con una estrella en el vientre" | Ricardo Arjona | Ricardo Arjona | Spanish | Vinicio Quezada |
| Honduras | | "Te amo" | Gloria Janet | Tony Sierra | Spanish | Oscar Cardozo Ocampo |
| Mexico | Televisa | "Contigo y con el mundo" | María del Sol | Miguel Alfonso Luna; José María Frías | Spanish | Jesús Medel |
| Netherlands Antilles | ATM | "Una canción para una nación" | Ced Ride | Ced Ride | Spanish | Erroll Colina |
| Nicaragua | SSTV | "Niña" | Raúl Hernández | Nelson Aragón | Spanish | Francisco Cedeño |
| Panama | | "Ven" | Paulette | Lorena Moreno; Wilton Vargas | Spanish | Oscar Cardozo Ocampo |
| Paraguay | Teledifusora Paraguaya | "Un mundo diferente" | Marco de Brix | Antonio Medina Boselli | Spanish | Oscar Cardozo Ocampo |
| Peru | | "Partiré, buscaré" | Rocky Belmonte | Jorge Tafur | Spanish | Jorge Tafur |
| Portugal | RTP | "Vivo a vida cantando" | Luís Filipe | Benis de Fonseca; Luís Filipe | Portuguese | Jaime Oliveira |
| Puerto Rico | Telemundo Puerto Rico | "Para ser feliz" | Sandra Rogers | René Ferrer; Sandra Rogers | Spanish | Druco Gandía |
| Spain | TVE | "Dulce maldición" | Álex & Christina | Christina Rosenvinge; Álex de la Nuez | Spanish | Eduardo Leiva |
| United States | Univision | "Así somos, así soy" | Miguel Ángel Mejía | América Vázquez; Miguel Ángel Mejía | Spanish | Rodolfo Martínez |
| Uruguay | Sociedad Televisora Larrañaga | "Secreto enamorado" | Daniel Mantero | Daniel Mantero | Spanish | Julio Frade |
| Venezuela | | "Hoy he vuelto a reír" | Iñaki | Fernando Osorio; Juan Carlos Pérez Soto | Spanish | William Croes |

== Festival overview ==
The festival was held on Saturday 19 November 1988, beginning at 20:00 DST (23:00 UTC). It was directed by Roberto O. Muñoz, and presented by Pinky and Juan Alberto Badía. The musical director was Oscar Cardozo Ocampo, who conducted the 40-piece orchestra when required.

The show was opened with Estela Raval performing a song composed for the occasion by Chico Novarro. Jaime Torres made a guest performance playing the charango. The hosts presented Raúl Velasco with an honorary plaque awarded by the OTI for his contributions to the OTI Festival throughout its history. While Pinky was doing one of the presentations, an anonymous intruder entered the stage and greeted her with two kisses.

The winner was the song "Todavía eres mi mujer", written by Carlos Castellón, and performed by Guillermo Guido representing Argentina; with "Un mundo diferente", written by Antonio Medina Boselli, and performed by Marco de Brix representing Paraguay, placing second; and "De tu boca", written by Juan Luis Guerra, and performed by Taty Salas representing the Dominican Republic, and "Partiré, buscaré", written by Jorge Tafur, and performed by Rocky Belmonte representing Peru, both placing third. There was a trophy for each of the first three places. The first prize trophy was delivered by Guillermo Cañedo, president of OTI; the second prize trophy by Ricardo Porto, undersecretary of OTI mass communication; and the third prize trophy by Nicanor González, president of the OTI programs committee. The festival ended with a reprise of the winning entry.

Winner

Results of the OTI Festival 1988
| R/O | Country | Song | Artist | Points | Place |
|---|---|---|---|---|---|
| 1 | Ecuador | "Juan Cansino" | Ketty Pazmiño | 0 | 14 |
| 2 | Bolivia | "Sólo un despertar" | Mimi | 0 | 14 |
| 3 | Peru | "Partiré, buscaré" | Rocky Belmonte | 16 | 3 |
| 4 | Mexico | "Contigo y con el mundo" | María del Sol | 14 | 5 |
| 5 | Honduras | "Te amo" | Gloria Janet | 0 | 14 |
| 6 | Dominican Republic | "De tu boca" | Taty Salas | 16 | 3 |
| 7 | Venezuela | "Hoy he vuelto a reír" | Iñaki | 0 | 14 |
| 8 | United States | "Así somos, así soy" | Miguel Ángel Mejía | 0 | 14 |
| 9 | Costa Rica | "Hoy le canto al mundo" | Frank Victory | 2 | 10 |
| 10 | Argentina | "Todavía eres mi mujer" | Guillermo Guido | 26 | 1 |
| 11 | El Salvador | "No está bien" | Walter Artiga | 0 | 14 |
| 12 | Guatemala | "Con una estrella en el vientre" | Ricardo Arjona | 1 | 12 |
| 13 | Chile | "Es mi libertad" | Cecilia Castro | 6 | 7 |
| 14 | Colombia | "Latinoamérica" | Harold Orozco | 6 | 7 |
| 15 | Puerto Rico | "Para ser feliz" | Sandra Rogers | 0 | 14 |
| 16 | Panama | "Ven" | Paulette | 0 | 14 |
| 17 | Nicaragua | "Niña" | Raúl Hernández | 1 | 12 |
| 18 | Spain | "Dulce maldición" | Álex & Christina | 2 | 10 |
| 19 | Uruguay | "Secreto enamorado" | Daniel Mantero | 14 | 5 |
| 20 | Paraguay | "Un mundo diferente" | Marco de Brix | 25 | 2 |
| 21 | Netherlands Antilles | "Una canción para una nación" | Ced Ride | 0 | 14 |
| 22 | Portugal | "Vivo a vida cantando" | Luís Filipe | 6 | 7 |

=== Song presenters ===
Each of the competing entries was introduced to the audience by a celebrity:

- Ecuador – none (Note: Presented by Juan Alberto Badía alone)
- Bolivia – Horacio Ranieri
- Peru – Cristina
- Mexico – Betiana Blum
- Honduras – Orlando Netti
- Dominican Republic – unknown
- Venezuela – Lupita Ferrer
- United States – Andrea del Boca
- Costa Rica – Marta González
- Argentina – Iris Marga
- El Salvador – Lucía Miranda
- Guatemala – Pablito Ruiz
- Chile – Silvana Di Lorenzo
- Colombia – Jorge Barreiro
- Puerto Rico – Juan José Camero
- Panama – Ambar La Fox
- Nicaragua – Julio Numhauser
- Spain – Estela Raval
- Uruguay – Marta Bianchi
- Paraguay – Amelita Baltar
- Netherlands Antilles – Ethel Rojo
- Portugal – Carmen Yazalde

=== Jury ===
Each of the nine members of the single jury awarded 5–1 points to its five favourite songs, and wrote its vote anonymously on a ballot. The members of the jury were:

- Juan Carlos Calderón – songwriter
- Roberto Cantoral – singer-songwriter
- Susana Rinaldi – tango singer
- Mario Cavagnaro – singer-songwriter
- Antonio Cerviño – musician
- Casto Darío – singer
- Norma Aleandro – actress
- Shegundo Galarza – conductor
- José José – singer

== Detailed voting result ==
Production used a computerized system to register the voting. The hosts announced in ascending order the results of each ballot, which were picked in random order. Viewers in the theater and at home were shown the results using a projector-board installed in the hall. During ballot 5, host Pinky accidentally announced the top result in first place, and it was registered 1 point to Uruguay instead of 5. To fix this, the computer generated random full results, and reverted them afterwards. After correctly registering one ballot, the points accumulated so far were displayed.

| | | Jury | | | | | | | | | Classification | |
| | | Ballot 1 | Ballot 2 | Ballot 3 | Ballot 4 | Ballot 5 | Ballot 6 | Ballot 7 | Ballot 8 | Ballot 9 | Points | Place |
|---|---|---|---|---|---|---|---|---|---|---|---|---|
| Contestants | Ecuador | | | | | | | | | | 0 | 14 |
| Contestants | Bolivia | | | | | | | | | | 0 | 14 |
| Contestants | Peru | | | 3 | 1 | 4 | 4 | 3 | 1 | | 16 | 3 |
| Contestants | Mexico | 3 | | | 3 | | 2 | | 4 | 2 | 14 | 5 |
| Contestants | Honduras | | | | | | | | | | 0 | 14 |
| Contestants | Dominican Republic | | 1 | | 5 | | 5 | | | 5 | 16 | 3 |
| Contestants | Venezuela | | | | | | | | | | 0 | 14 |
| Contestants | United States | | | | | | | | | | 0 | 14 |
| Contestants | Costa Rica | 2 | | | | | | | | | 2 | 10 |
| Contestants | Argentina | 4 | 3 | 5 | | | | 5 | 5 | 4 | 26 | 1 |
| Contestants | El Salvador | | | | | | | | | | 0 | 14 |
| Contestants | Guatemala | 1 | | | | | | | | | 1 | 12 |
| Contestants | Chile | | | | | 2 | | 4 | | | 6 | 7 |
| Contestants | Colombia | | | 4 | | | | 2 | | | 6 | 7 |
| Contestants | Puerto Rico | | | | | | | | | | 0 | 14 |
| Contestants | Panama | | | | | | | | | | 0 | 14 |
| Contestants | Nicaragua | | | | | 1 | | | | | 1 | 12 |
| Contestants | Spain | | 2 | | | | | | | | 2 | 10 |
| Contestants | Uruguay | | | 1 | 2 | 5 | 3 | | 3 | | 14 | 5 |
| Contestants | Paraguay | 5 | 4 | 2 | 4 | 3 | 1 | 1 | 2 | 3 | 25 | 2 |
| Contestants | Netherlands Antilles | | | | | | | | | | 0 | 14 |
| Contestants | Portugal | | 5 | | | | | | | 1 | 6 | 7 |

== Broadcast ==
The festival was broadcast in the 22 participating countries and in Aruba, where the corresponding OTI member broadcasters relayed the contest through their networks after receiving it live via satellite.

Known details on the broadcasts in each country, including the specific broadcasting stations and commentators are shown in the tables below.

Broadcasters and commentators in participating countries
| Country | Broadcaster | Channel(s) | Commentator(s) | Ref. |
|---|---|---|---|---|
| Argentina | ATC | | | |
| Chile | TVN | Canal 7 (Note: Delayed broadcast at 21:30 CLST (00:30+1 UTC).) | Andrea Tessa, Juan Carlos Duque, and Pancho Aranda | |
| Chile | UTV | Canal 11 | Andrea Tessa, Juan Carlos Duque, and Pancho Aranda | |
| Chile | UCTV | Canal 13 | Andrea Tessa, Juan Carlos Duque, and Pancho Aranda | |
| Costa Rica | Univisión de Costa Rica | Univisión Canal 2 | | |
| Mexico | Televisa | Canal 2 | | |
| Netherlands Antilles | ATM | TeleCuraçao | | |
| Paraguay | Teledifusora Paraguaya | Canal 13 RPC | Menchi Barriocanal and Bruno Masi | |
| Portugal | RTP | RTP1 (Note: Delayed broadcast on 24 November at 22:00 WET (22:00 UTC)) | | |
| Spain | TVE | TVE 2 | Carlos Herrera | |
| United States | Univision (Note: Delayed broadcast later that day by all Univision affiliates, each in their own time zone.) | | | |

Broadcasters and commentators in non-participating countries and territories
| Country | Broadcaster | Channel(s) | Commentator(s) | Ref. |
|---|---|---|---|---|
| Aruba | TeleAruba | | | |
