= Carlos Vicente =

Carlos Vicente may refer to:

- Carlos Vicente (actor), Spanish actor part of the TV series Merlí
- Carlos Vicente (footballer) (born 1999), Spanish football winger
- Carlos Vicente (musician), Uruguayan musician part of the musical group Rumbo, with Laura Canoura
- Carlos Vicente (skier) (born 1971), Spanish cross-country skier
