= Argentina in the OTI Festival =

- OTI Festival
- Participating broadcaster: Argentina Televisora Color (ATC) (Note: Also as Canal 7 Argentina and Televisión Argentina.); Teleonce (Note: Also as Oncevisión and Canal Once.)

Participation summary
- Appearances: 27
- First appearance: 1972
- Last appearance: 2000
- Highest placement: 1st: 1979, 1988, 1991, 1994
- Host: 1980, 1988
- Participation history: 1972; 1973; 1974; 1975; 1976; 1977; 1978; 1979; 1980; 1981; 1982; 1983; 1984; 1985; 1986; 1987; 1988; 1989; 1990; 1991; 1992; 1993; 1994; 1995; 1996; 1997; 1998; 2000

The participation of Argentina in the OTI Festival began at the first OTI Festival in 1972. The Argentinian participating broadcasters were Argentina Televisora Color (ATC) and Teleonce, which were members of the Organización de Televisión Iberoamericana (OTI). They participated in twenty-seven of the twenty-eight editions, only missing the 1974 festival. They won the festival four times: in 1979, 1988, 1991, and 1994; and ATC hosted the event twice: in 1980 and 1988. All Argentinian entries were selected internally.

== History ==
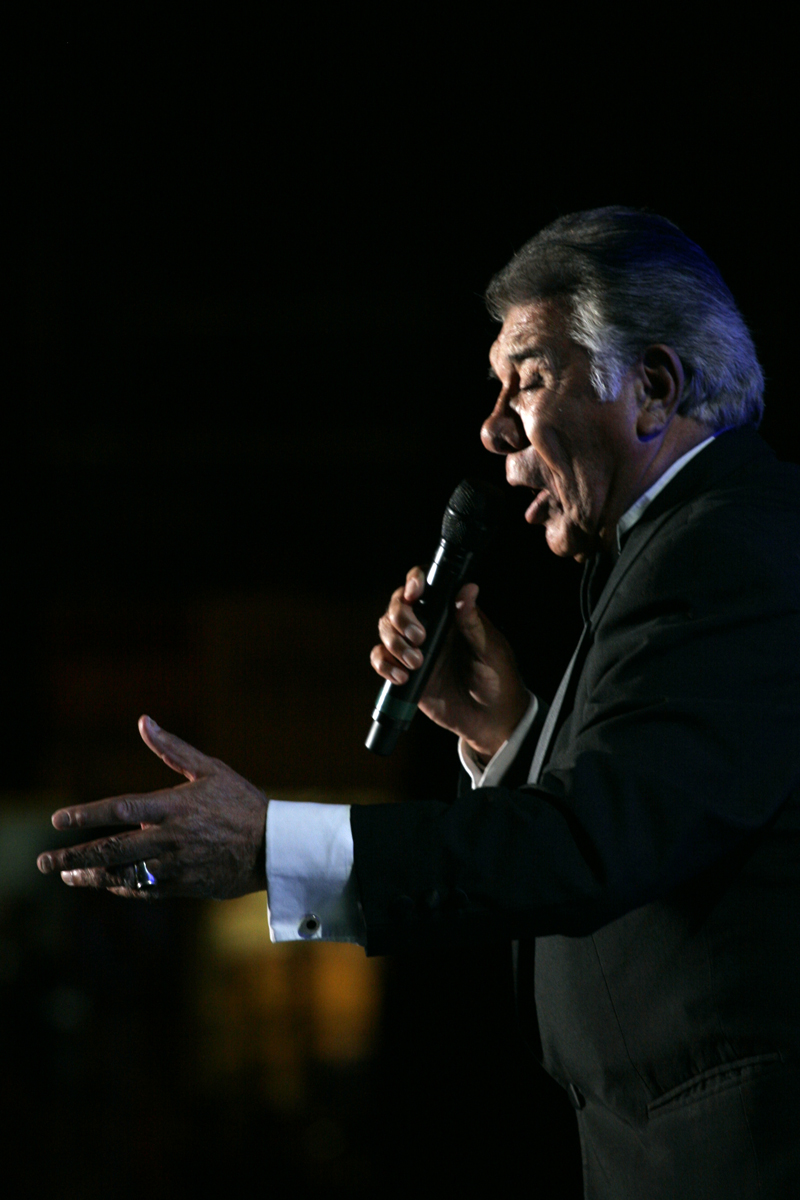
Tango singer Raúl Lavié represented Argentina in 1996

Argentina was one of the most successful countries in the history of the OTI Festival. The two broadcasters managed to win the contest on four occasions. The first win came in 1979 with the song "Cuenta conmigo" sung by Daniel Riolobos, which turned into a hit. Some years later, in 1988 they won the festival for second time with the song "Todavía eres mi mujer" sung by Guillermo Guido. In 1991, they won for a third time with "¿Adónde estás ahora?" by Claudia Brant. Three years later, in 1994, the country won for fourth and last time with "Canción despareja" by Claudia Carenzio.

Apart from their victories, Argentina achieved second place on another four occasions: in 1981 with "Súbete a mi nube" by Marianella, in 1985 with "Y tu, prohibida" by Marcelo Alejandro, in 1996 with "Cuanto te amo" by Guillermo Guido, and in 1998 with "Sin amor" by Alicia Vignola. Argentina also achieved two third places in 1980 with "Dime adiós" by Luis Ordóñez and 1986 with "A ti no te ha dicho" by Hugo Marcel.

Guillermo Guido's three appearances are of note, as he returned to the event in 1996 and 2000 after his victory in 1988.

== Participation overview ==
Table key
1	First place
2	Second place
3	Third place
F	Finalist
SF	Semi-finalist
◇	Contest cancelled

Year	Song	Artist	Songwriter(s)	Conductor	Place	Points
1972	"Sabes que estamos aquí América"	Víctor Heredia	Víctor Heredia	Augusto Algueró	9	3
1973	"Dije que te quiero"	Juan Eduardo	Juan Eduardo; Elo Santos	Horacio Malvicino	9	3
1974	Did not participate					
1975	"Dos habitantes"	Marty Cosens	Homar Sánchez; Dino Ramos	Jonathan Zarzosa	10	3
1976	"¿Cómo olvidar que te quise tanto?"	Adriana Santamaría			8	3
1977	"Jugar a vivir"	Jerónimo	Juan José Camero; Jerónimo	Javier Iturralde	6	3
1978	"Dijeron que era un niño"	Carlos Bazán	Diego Armando Fittipaldi	Osvaldo Requena	11	7
1979	"Cuenta conmigo"	Daniel Riolobos	Chico Novarro; Raúl Parentella	Raúl Parentella	1	43
1980	"Dime adiós"	Luis Ordóñez	Mario Clavell	Horacio Malvicino	3	31
1981	"Súbete a mi nube"	Marianella	Chico Novarro; Mike Ribas	Mike Ribas	2	40
1982	"Canción para dar las gracias"	Magdalena León	Luis Gonzales	Horacio Malvicino	4	22
1983	"Charlaciones"	Silvina Garré	Litto Nebbia	Horacio Malvicino	—N/a	
1984	"La luz de mi escritorio no se enciende"	Alan y Roy	Alan Mc.Claskis; Roy Mc.Claskis	Body Mc.Claskis	—N/a	
1985	"Y tú prohibida"	Marcelo Alejandro	Alejandro Vezzani; Miguel Lorena	Mike Ribas	2	—N/a
1986	"A ti no te ha dicho"	Hugo Marcel	Pedro Favini; Mono Flores	Mike Ribas	3	—N/a
1987	"Todavía la vida"	Lalo Márquez y Daniel Altamirano	Marta Bruno; Lalo Márquez	Fernando Correia Martins	—N/a	
1988	"Todavía eres mi mujer"	Guillermo Guido	Carlos Castellón	Oscar Cardozo Ocampo	1	26
1989	"Te quedarás en mí"	Mónica Cruz	Daniel García; Mario Schajris		—N/a	
1990	"Quédate chiquilín"	Trío San Javier	Pedro A. Favini; Pablo Ramírez	William Sánchez	—N/a	
1991	"¿Adónde estás ahora?"	Claudia Brant	Claudia Brant; Sebastián Schon	Chucho Ferrer	1	—N/a
1992	"Lo vivido"	Horacio Molina	Eladia Blázquez; Horacio Molina		—N/a	
1993	"Yo soy el otro"	Marcelo San Juan	Fernando Porta; Marcelo San Juan	José Fabra	—N/a	
1994	"Canción despareja"	Claudia Carenzio	Bibi Albert		1	31
1995	"Si se pierden las canciones"	Inés Rinaldi y Fernando Porta	Francisco Bagala; Fernando Porta	Oscar Cardozo Ocampo	—N/a	
1996	"Cuánto te amo"	Guillermo Guido	Carlos Castellón	Carlos Castellón	2	—N/a
1997	"Sin tu mitad"	Raúl Lavié	E. Blásquez; S. Consentino	Víctor Salazar	SF	—N/a
1998	"Sin amor"	Alicia Vignola	Bibi Albert; Héctor Dengis	Álvaro Esquivel	2	—N/a
1999	Contest cancelled ◇					
2000	"Amar es tan simple"	Guillermo Guido	Alejandro Szwarcman	José Ogivieki	F	—N/a

== Hosting ==
Year	City	Venue	Hosts	Ref.
1980	Buenos Aires	Teatro General San Martín	Liliana López Foresi; Antonio Carrizo	
1988	Buenos Aires	Teatro Nacional Cervantes	Lidia Satragno; Juan Alberto Badía	
