= Argentina in the OTI Festival 1988 =

- OTI Festival 1988
- Participating broadcaster: Argentina Televisora Color (ATC)
- Country: Argentina
- Selection process: National final

Competing entry
- Song: "Todavía eres mi mujer"
- Artist: Guillermo Guido
- Songwriter: Carlos Castellón

Placement
- Final result: 1st, 26 points

Participation chronology
◄1987 •	1988	• 1989►

Argentina was represented at the OTI Festival 1988 with the song "Todavía eres mi mujer", written by Carlos Castellón, and performed by Guillermo Guido. The Argentinian participating broadcaster, Argentina Televisora Color (ATC), selected its entry through a televised national final. The song, that was performed in position 10, placed first with 26 points, out of 22 competing entries, winning the festival. In addition, ATC was also the host broadcaster and staged the event at the Teatro Nacional Cervantes in Buenos Aires.

== National stage ==
Argentina Televisora Color (ATC) held a televised national final to select its entry for the 17th edition of the OTI Festival.

Competing entries on the national final – Argentina 1988 (Note: Incomplete list of the competing entries.)
Song	Artist	Songwriter(s)
"No te olvides"	Marechal	Luis Paz; Marechal
"Todavía eres mi mujer"	Guillermo Guido	Carlos Castellón

=== National final ===
ATC staged the national final at its studios in Buenos Aires, and broadcast it live. The winner was "Todavía eres mi mujer", written by Carlos Castellón, and performed by Guillermo Guido.

Winner

Result of the national final – Argentina 1988
R/O	Song	Artist	Result
	"Todavía eres mi mujer"	Guillermo Guido	1
17	"No te olvides"	Marechal	

== At the OTI Festival ==
On 19 November 1988, the OTI Festival was held at the Teatro Nacional Cervantes in Buenos Aires, Argentina, hosted by ATC, and broadcast live throughout Ibero-America. Guillermo Guido performed "Todavía eres mi mujer" in position 10, with Oscar Cardozo Ocampo conducting the event's orchestra, and placing first out of 22 competing entries, with 26 points, winning the festival.
