= Maia Castro =

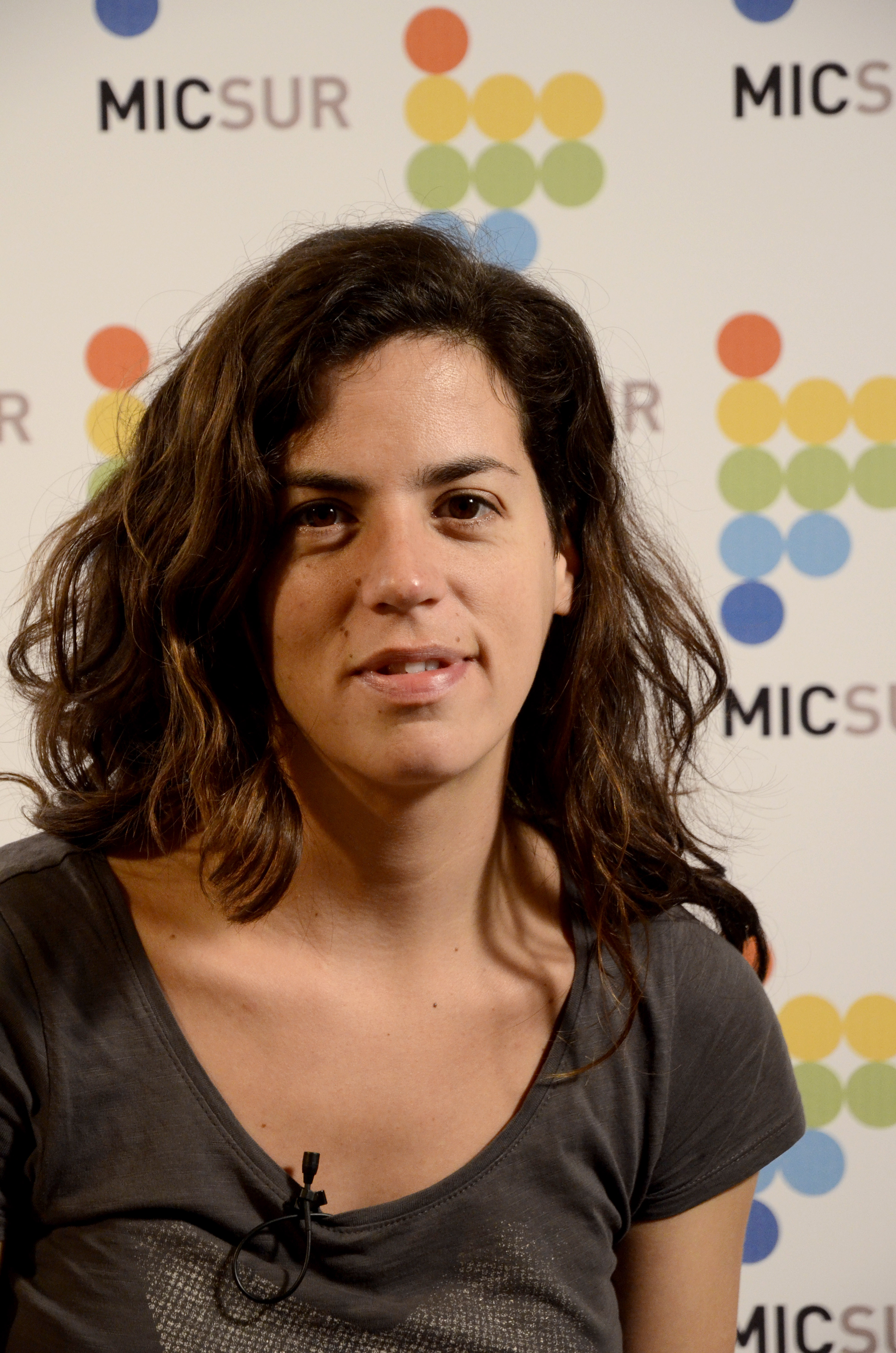
- Born: 21 March 1980 (age 45); Montevideo
- Occupations: Singer, composer
- Years active: Since 1995
- Website: www.maiacastro.com

Maia Castro (born 21 March 1980) is an Uruguayan singer and composer of tango music. She has been active since 2005.

== Biography ==
On 21 March 1980, Maia Castro was born in Montevideo, capital of Uruguay.

Castro began her career in 2006 with her debut album, but she had been active in music as a member of pop, rock, and blues music groups in the past.

In 2010, Castro was invited by the Philharmonic Orchestra of Montevideo to perform in the Tres mujeres para el tango concert with Laura Canoura and Mónica Navarro. With the Orchestra, she performed two outdoor shows and three in the Solís Theatre. She continued through the next year with shows through Uruguay and recording for her third studio album.

In 2014, Castro went on her "Uruguay Tour," beginning with a show at the Sala Zitarrosa in Montevideo, then on to Carmelo, Colonia del Sacramento, Mercedes, San José de Mayo, Florida, and Maldonaldo. She went on tour again the following year in Europe, bringing tango music to Milan, (Germany), and playing at the Tango Festival of Finland.
