= OTI Festival 1994 =

23rd OTI Song Festival

Dates and venue
- Semi-final: 14 October 1994
- Final: 15 October 1994
- Venue: Teatro Principal; Valencia, Spain

Organization
- Organizer: Organización de Televisión Iberoamericana (OTI)

Production
- Host broadcaster: Televisión Española (TVE)
- Director: José Luis Moreno
- Musical director: José Fabra
- Presenters: Ana Obregón; Francisco

Participants
- Number of entries: 24
- Number of finalists: 12
- Non-returning countries: Canada
- Participation map: Finalist countries Countries eliminated in the semi-final Countries that participated in the past but not in 1994

Vote
- Voting system: Each member of a single jury awards 5–1 points to its five favourite songs in a secret vote
- Winning song: Argentina "Canción despareja"

The OTI Festival 1994 (Spanish: Vigésimo Tercer Gran Premio de la Canción Iberoamericana, Portuguese: Vigésimo Terceiro Grande Prêmio da Canção Ibero-Americana) was the 23rd edition of the OTI Festival. It consisted of a semi-final on 14 October and a final on 15 October 1994, held at Teatro Principal in Valencia, Spain, and presented by Ana Obregón and Francisco. It was organised by the Organización de Televisión Iberoamericana (OTI) and host broadcaster Televisión Española (TVE), who staged the event after winning the 1993 festival for Spain with the song "Enamorarse" by Ana Reverte.

Broadcasters from twenty-four countries participated in the festival. The winner was the song "Canción despareja", written by Bibi Albert, and performed by Claudia Carenzio representing Argentina; with "Cuestión de suerte", written by Chema Purón, and performed by Ana María representing Spain, placing second; and "Enfurecida", written by J. Leonardo, L. Oliver, and Luis Silva, and performed by Silva himself representing Venezuela, placing third.

== Location ==
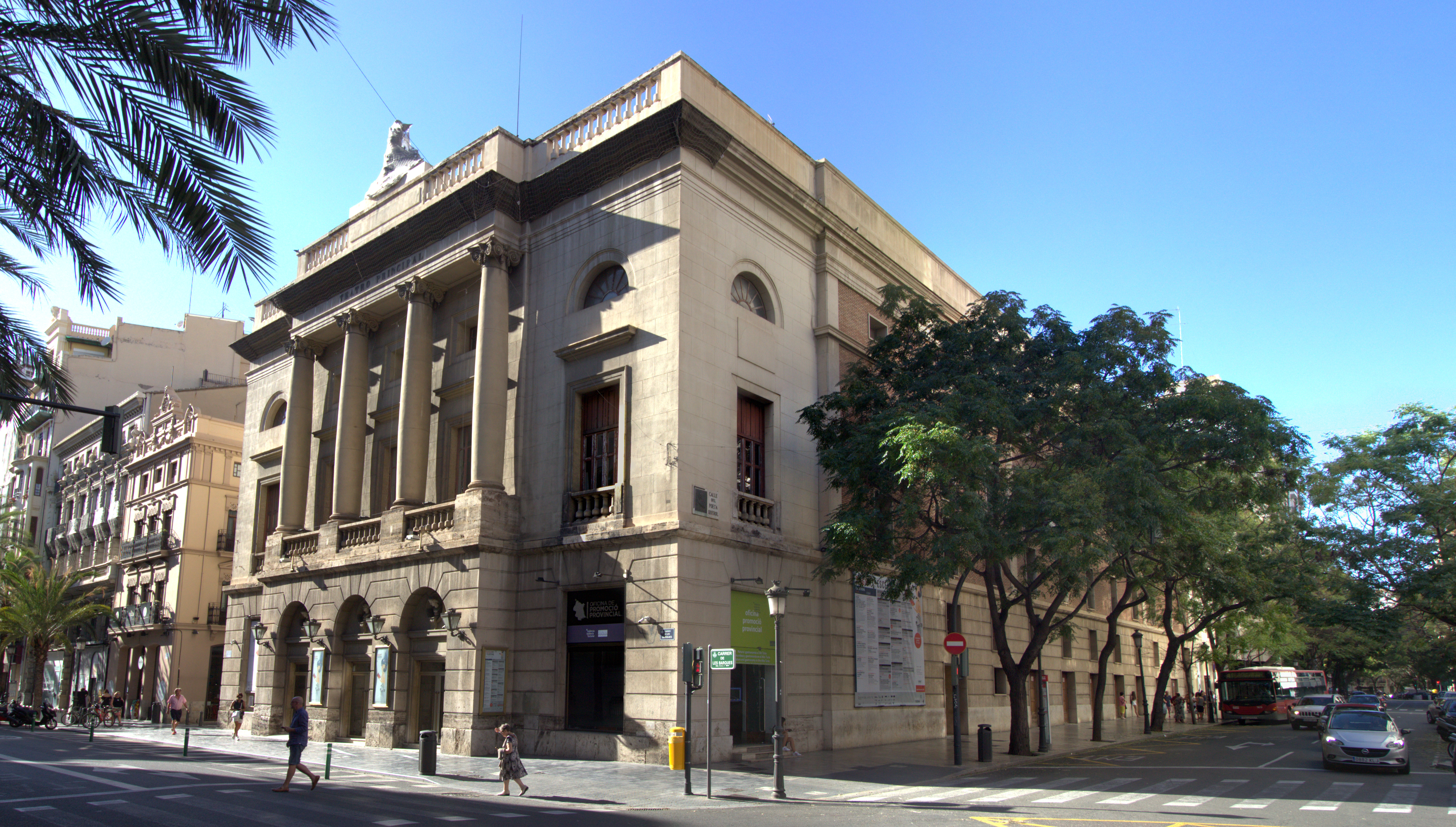
Teatro Principal, Valencia – host venue of the OTI Festival 1994.

For the third consecutive year, the Organización de Televisión Iberoamericana (OTI) designated Televisión Española (TVE) as the host broadcaster for the 23rd edition of the OTI Festival. TVE staged the event again in Valencia. The selected venue was the venue that hosted the two previous editions, Teatro Principal, a theatre opened in 1832 that was designed by Filippo da Pistoia.

== Participants ==
Broadcasters from twenty-four countries participated in this edition of the OTI festival. The OTI members, public or private broadcasters from Spain, Portugal, and twenty-two Spanish and Portuguese speaking countries of Ibero-America signed up for the festival. From the countries that participated in the previous edition, only Canada was absent.

Some of the participating broadcasters, such as those representing Chile, Cuba, Ecuador, Panama, and the United States, selected their entries through their regular national televised competitions. Other broadcasters decided to select their entry internally.

Two performing artists had previously represented the same country in previous editions: Ricardo Padilla had represented Costa Rica in 1980 and 1982, and Rocky Belmonte had represented Peru in 1988 and 1990.

Participants of the OTI Festival 1994
Country	Broadcaster(s)	Song	Artist	Songwriter(s)	Language	Conductor
Argentina		"Canción despareja"	Claudia Carenzio	Bibi Albert	Spanish	
Bolivia		"Para poder hablar de amor"	Gilka Gutiérrez	Edwin Castellanos	Spanish	
Brazil		"Mulher"	Zé Renato	C. Mesquita; S. Cabral	Portuguese	
Chile	TVN; UCTV; CHV; CCT; Megavisión	"La vida va"	María Inés Naveillán	Luis "Poncho" Venegas	Spanish	
Colombia		"Quiero saber"	Jorge Hernán Baena	Francesco	Spanish	
Costa Rica	Repretel	"Como vino... se fue"	Ricardo Padilla	Ricardo Padilla	Spanish	
Cuba	ICRT	"Amor y cadenas"	Osvaldo Rodríguez	Osvaldo Rodríguez	Spanish	Guillermo Valverde
Dominican Republic		"Con agua de sal"	Miriam Cruz	Manuel Jiménez	Spanish	
Ecuador		"Temporada baja"	Felipe y Francisco Terán (Contravía)	Francisco Terán	Spanish	
El Salvador	TCS	"Tú, sólo tú"	Claudia Basagoitia	José Balter	Spanish	
Guatemala		"Sor Juana Inés y el ángel"	Noris	Álvaro R. Aguilar	Spanish	
Honduras		"Espera hasta que den las tres"	Delma Adriana Reyes	Reniery Seaman Silva	Spanish	
Mexico	Televisa	"Rompe el cristal"	Fuga de Goya	José María Frías; Carlos Muñoz	Spanish	
Netherlands Antilles	ATM	"Libre"	Boy Thode	Erroll Colina; Frank Cafsia	Spanish	
Nicaragua		"La sombra del sol"	Álvaro Villagra	Francis Leticia Boruckin	Spanish	
Panama		"Mi ciudad"	Armando Valdivieso	A. Almanza; Armando Valdivieso	Spanish	
Paraguay		"Tierra herida"	Cristina Vera Díaz	Belisario; Cristina Vera; R.A. Bucak	Spanish	
Peru		"Mía"	Rocky Belmonte	Armando Massé	Spanish	
Portugal	RTP	"Eu quero um planeta azul"	Mafalda Sacchetti	Rosa Lobato de Faria; João Mota	Portuguese	
Puerto Rico	Telemundo Puerto Rico	"Lo que te toca vivir"	Jessica Cristina	José Luis Melendez	Spanish	Pedro Rivera
Spain	TVE	"Cuestión de suerte"	Ana María	Chema Purón	Spanish	José Fabra
United States	Univision	"Ganas de gritar"	Héctor Galaz	Omar Sánchez	Spanish	
Uruguay	Sociedad Televisora Larrañaga	"Tus sentidos"	Laura Canoura	Laura Canoura; Hugo Fattoruso	Spanish	
Venezuela		"Enfurecida"	Luis Silva	J. Leonardo; Luis Silva; L. Oliver	Spanish	

== Festival overview ==
The festival consisted of a semi-final on Friday 14 October and a final on Saturday 15 October 1994. It was directed by José Luis Moreno and presented by Ana Obregón and Francisco. Francisco had presented the festival in 1993. The musical director was José Fabra, who conducted the 60-piece orchestra when required. The shows featured guest performances by Lola Flores, Sergio Dalma, Los Panchos, The Platters, José Feliciano, Emmanuel, Mireille Mathieu, El Consorcio, and María Vidal.

=== Semi-final ===
The semi-final was held on Friday 14 October 1994, beginning at 22:30 CET (21:30 UTC). The twenty-four participating entries were performed in the semi-final, of which only twelve advanced to the final. The position of the entries was not revealed, only the qualifiers were announced.

Qualifier

Results of the semi-final of the OTI Festival 1994
R/O	Country	Song	Artist	Result
1	Nicaragua	"La sombra del sol"	Álvaro Villagra	—N/a
2	Puerto Rico	"Lo que te toca vivir"	Jessica Cristina	—N/a
3	Argentina	"Canción despareja"	Claudia Carenzio	Qualified
4	Brazil	"Mulher"	Zé Renato	Qualified
5	Honduras	"Espera hasta que den las tres"	Delma Adriana Reyes	—N/a
6	Mexico	"Rompe el cristal"	Fuga de Goya	Qualified
7	Peru	"Mía"	Rocky Belmonte	—N/a
8	Cuba	"Amor y cadenas"	Osvaldo Rodríguez	Qualified
9	Guatemala	"Sor Juana Inés y el ángel"	Noris	—N/a
10	Chile	"La vida va"	María Inés Naveillán	Qualified
11	United States	"Ganas de gritar"	Héctor Galaz	Qualified
12	Colombia	"Quiero saber"	Jorge Hernán Baena	—N/a
13	Panama	"Mi ciudad"	Armando Valdivieso	—N/a
14	Ecuador	"Temporada baja"	Felipe y Francisco Terán (Contravía)	Qualified
15	Portugal	"Eu quero um planeta azul"	Mafalda Sacchetti	Qualified
16	Dominican Republic	"Con agua de sal"	Miriam Cruz	Qualified
17	Netherlands Antilles	"Libre"	Boy Thode	—N/a
18	Costa Rica	"Como vino... se fue"	Ricardo Padilla	—N/a
19	Bolivia	"Para poder hablar de amor"	Gilka Gutiérrez	Qualified
20	El Salvador	"Tú, sólo tú"	Claudia Basagoitia	—N/a
21	Paraguay	"Tierra herida"	Cristina Vera Díaz	—N/a
22	Venezuela	"Enfurecida"	Luis Silva	Qualified
23	Uruguay	"Tus sentidos"	Laura Canoura	—N/a
24	Spain	"Cuestión de suerte"	Ana María	Qualified

=== Final ===
The final was held on Saturday 15 October 1994, beginning at 22:30 CET (21:30 UTC).

The winner was the song "Canción despareja", written by Bibi Albert, and performed by Claudia Carenzio representing Argentina; with "Cuestión de suerte", written by Chema Purón, and performed by Ana María representing Spain, placing second; and "Enfurecida", written by J. Leonardo, L. Oliver, and Luis Silva, and performed by Silva himself representing Venezuela, placing third. The first prize was endowed with a monetary amount of US$50,000, the second prize of US$30,000, and the third prize of US$20,000. The festival ended with a reprise of the winning entry.

Winner

Results of the final of the OTI Festival 1994
R/O	Country	Song	Artist	Points	Place
	Argentina	"Canción despareja"	Claudia Carenzio	31	1
	Brazil	"Mulher"	Zé Renato	0	11
	Mexico	"Rompe el cristal"	Fuga de Goya	9	5
	Cuba	"Amor y cadenas"	Osvaldo Rodríguez	3	9
	Chile	"La vida va"	María Inés Naveillán	3	9
	United States	"Ganas de gritar"	Héctor Galaz	0	11
	Ecuador	"Temporada baja"	Felipe y Francisco Terán (Contravía)	6	7
	Portugal	"Eu quero um planeta azul"	Mafalda Sacchetti	6	7
	Dominican Republic	"Con agua de sal"	Miriam Cruz	10	4
	Bolivia	"Para poder hablar de amor"	Gilka Gutiérrez	8	6
	Venezuela	"Enfurecida"	Luis Silva	16	3
	Spain	"Cuestión de suerte"	Ana María	28	2

=== Jury ===
The members of a single jury selected their favourite songs in a secret vote. The members of the event's orchestra acted collectively as one juror. The members of the jury were:

- José Feliciano – singer
- Simón Díaz – singer
- Rosita Amores – performer
- Rafael Basurto – singer, member of Los Panchos
- Jayme Marques – composer
- Rafael Beltrán – composer
- Marco Quelhas – composer
- Event's orquestra

== Detailed voting result ==
Each of the members of the jury awarded 5–1 points to its five favourite songs in order of preference, and wrote its vote anonymously on a ballot. In the semi-final, only the qualifiers were announced. In the final, the counting was conducted publicly, with the hosts announcing the results of each ballot, which were picked in random order.

== Broadcast ==
The festival was broadcast in the 24 participating countries where the corresponding OTI member broadcasters relayed the contest through their networks after receiving it live via satellite.

Known details on the broadcasts in each country, including the specific broadcasting stations and commentators are shown in the tables below.

Broadcasters and commentators in participating countries
Country	Broadcaster	Channel(s)	Show(s)	Commentator(s)	Ref.
Costa Rica	Repretel	Canal 6	Final (Note: Delayed broadcast at 18:00 CST (00:00+1 UTC))		
Netherlands Antilles	ATM	TeleCuraçao	All shows (Note: Delayed broadcast of the semi-final on 15 October at 14:15 AST (18:15 UTC) right before the live broadcast of the final.)		
Spain	TVE	La Primera	All shows	No commentary	

== Reception ==
The Venezuelan entry, "Enfurecida" by Luis Silva was used as the opening theme song for the telenovela Pura sangre.
