= Uruguay in the OTI Festival =

- OTI Festival
- Participating broadcaster: Sociedad Televisora Larrañaga; Monte Carlo Televisión; Sociedad Anónima Emisora de Televisión y Anexos (SAETA)

Participation summary
- Appearances: 26
- First appearance: 1972
- Last appearance: 1998
- Highest placement: 5th in 1988
- Participation history: 1972; 1973; 1974; 1975; 1976; 1977; 1978; 1979; 1980; 1981; 1982; 1983; 1984; 1985; 1986; 1987; 1988; 1989; 1990; 1991; 1992; 1993; 1994; 1995; 1996; 1997; 1998; 2000

The participation of Uruguay in the OTI Festival began at the inaugural OTI Festival in 1972. The Uruguayan participating broadcasters were Sociedad Televisora Larrañaga, Monte Carlo Televisión, and Sociedad Anónima Emisora de Televisión y Anexos (SAETA), which were members of the Organización de Televisión Iberoamericana (OTI). They participated alternately in twenty-six of the twenty-eight editions, only missing the 1984 and 2000 festivals. Their best result in the festival was fifth achieved in 1988.

== History ==
Uruguay debuted in the OTI Festival in 1972 with "Busco mi destino" by Ronayr Franco. Its trajectory in the festival was only moderate and only managed to reach the top 10 in five occasions. Although they were unable to win the contest, they achieved a significant result with the song "Secreto enamorado" by Daniel Mantero in 1988 which turned into a hit in the country.

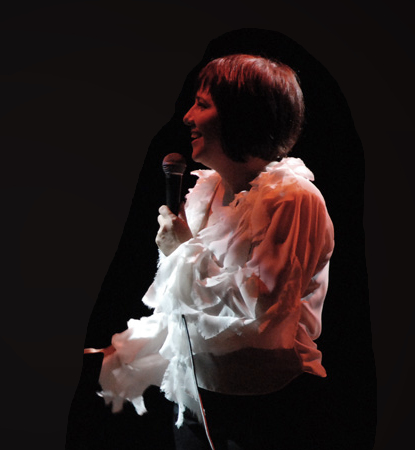
Laura Canoura Represented Uruguay in 1994

== Participation overview ==
Table key
| F | Finalist |
| SF | Semi-finalist |
| ◇ | Contest cancelled |

| Year | Song | Artist | Songwriter(s) | Conductor | Place | Points |
|---|---|---|---|---|---|---|
| 1972 | "Busco mi destino" | Rona | Jorge da Trindade | Augusto Algueró | 9 | 3 |
| 1973 | "El universo es un corazón" | Aldo | Aldo | Ivan Paulo | 8 | 4 |
| 1974 | "La montaña de la vida" | María Elisa | Jorge da Trindade | Chucho Ferrer | 7 | 4 |
| 1975 | "Quiero nacer" | Ricardo Montaña | Carlos de Coits | Julio Frade | 10 | 3 |
| 1976 | "Otra vez cantaré" | Ronald | | | 7 | 7 |
| 1977 | "Quiero vivir" | Miguel Bobbio | Mario de Azagra | Julio Frade | 11 | 2 |
| 1978 | "Canta guitarra, canta" | Horacio Paternó | Lázaro | Julio Frade | 13 | 3 |
| 1979 | "Vamos a dar amor" | Dolores | Mario López Azagra | Julio Frade | 16 | 4 |
| 1980 | "Te lo quedé diciendo" | Juca Sheppard | Federico Silva; Dardo Martínez | Julio Frade | 19 | 4 |
| 1981 | "Olvidemos recordando" | Ariel | Mario de Azagra | | 19 | 4 |
| 1982 | "Hermandad" | Ana María Pascual | Nelson Rodríguez; Horacio Sosa | Leslie Mullz | 12 | 13 |
| 1983 | "Historia del buen ladrón" | Mario Echevarría | Mario Echevarría | Julio Frade | —N/a | |
| 1984 | Did not participate | | | | | |
| 1985 | "Siempre más" | Nelson Candia | Mario de Azagra | Julio Frade | —N/a | |
| 1986 | "Somos valientes" | Miguel Ángel Montiel | Miguel Ángel Montiel | Julio Frade | —N/a | |
| 1987 | "Volvamos a empezar" | Fabricio | Mario de Azagra | Julio Frade | —N/a | |
| 1988 | "Secreto enamorado" | Daniel Mantero | Daniel Mantero | Julio Frade | 5 | 14 |
| 1989 | "Gracias" | Eduardo Fabián | | | —N/a | |
| 1990 | "Sin promesas" | Mario Echeverría | Mario de Azagra | Julio Frade | —N/a | |
| 1991 | "Salvaje" | Daniel Mantero | Daniel Mantero | Julio Frade | SF | —N/a |
| 1992 | "Llegaste a mí" | Gustavo Nocetti | Mario de Azaga | | —N/a | |
| 1993 | "Si eres árbol caído" | Pablo Estramín | Pablo Estramín | Julio Frade | —N/a | |
| 1994 | "Tus sentidos" | Laura Canoura | Laura Canoura; Hugo Fattoruso | | SF | —N/a |
| 1995 | "Un mundo mejor" | Pájaro Canzani | Pájaro Canzani | Julio Frade | —N/a | |
| 1996 | "Quiero estrenar" | Los Iracundos | Los Iracundos | Julio Frade | —N/a | |
| 1997 | "Sin tu amor" | Javier Fernández | Carlos Fernández | Julio Frade | SF | —N/a |
| 1998 | "Razones" | María Elisa | Carlos Fernández | Julio Frade | F | —N/a |
| 1999 | Contest cancelled ◇ | | | | | |
| 2000 | Did not participate | | | | | |
