= Julia Vial =

Chilean journalist and television presenter

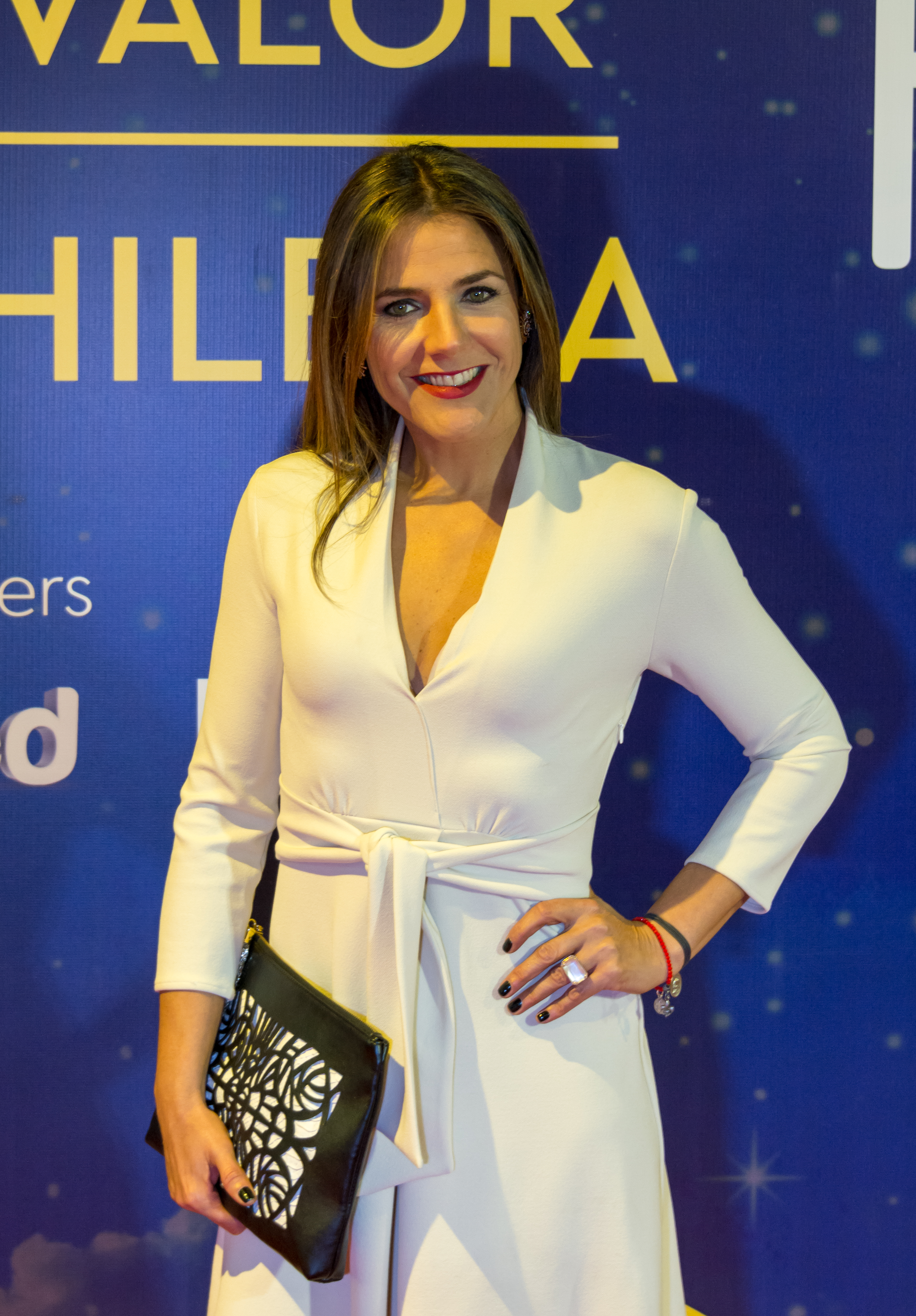
- Born: Julia Beatriz Vial Cuevas; June 24, 1977 (age 47); Santiago, Chile
- Other names: Julita Vial
- Occupation(s): Journalist and television presenter
- Years active: 2001–present
- Employer: La Red (2006–present)
- Television: Mañaneros
- Spouse: Leopoldo Muñoz (m. 2006)
- Children: Julia Muñoz Vial (b. 2010)

Julia Beatriz Vial Cuevas (born June 24, 1977 in Santiago) is a Chilean journalist and television presenter.

== Career in television ==
Julia Vial began her career as a commentator in 2001 on television screens Chilevisión.

In mid-2001 he emigrated to Canal 13, to be part of the television program Pantalla Abierta.

She was on Canal 13 until the end of 2004, in 2006 emigrated to TV channel La Red, to be the host of Intrusos with journalist Gaspar Domínguez (until 2007).

In December 2012, announced in its program output screen Intrusos to migrate the morning of La Red Mañaneros.

Since January 2013, will take over as host of Mañaneros.

== Personal life ==
Julia Vial is married to Leopoldo Muñoz, who has a daughter who was born with Down syndrome named Julia "Julita" Muñoz Vial.

== Filmography ==
Television
Year	Title	Role	Network
2001	SQP	Commentator	Chilevisión
2001–2004	Pantalla Abierta	TV Presenter (with Cristián Sánchez)	Canal 13
2006–2012	Intrusos en la televisión	TV Presenter	La Red
2007	Telethon Chile	Telephonist	ANATEL
2009–2010	Intrusos Prime	TV Presenter	La Red
2009	Latin American Idol	TV Presenter (only for Chile)	La Red
2010	Telethon Chile	Telephonist	ANATEL
2011	Fonda Na' Que Ver	TV Presenter	La Red
2011	Asi somos	TV Presenter remplacement	La Red
2011	Telethon Chile	Telephonist	ANATEL
2012	Mañaneros	TV Presenter remplacement	La Red
2012	Telethon Chile	TV Presenter	ANATEL
2013–present	Mañaneros	TV Presenter	La Red
