= Tomás Cox =

Chilean businessman

Personal details
- Born: 30 July 1950 (age 76) Chillán, Chile
- Children: Four
- Relatives: Nataniel Cox; Francisco José Cox (cousin); Pilar Cox (aunt)
- Education: University of Chile (1968); Pontifical Catholic University of Valparaíso (1970); Pontifical Catholic University of Chile (BS) (1970–1973)
- Profession: Journalist

Tomás Carlos Enrique Cox Fernández (born 30 July 1950) is a Chilean journalist and motivational speaker.

== Biography ==
=== Early life ===
Cox is the son of an agricultural engineer and the eldest of seven siblings. He grew up in the rural area of the Biobío Region until he was 13. Then, he moved to the capital city Santiago, where he temporarily attended San Ignacio School. After suffering school bullying, he moved to Notre Dame School in the same city.

After studying biology at the University of Chile, in 1970, he decided to start a BA in History at the Institute of History of the Pontifical Catholic University of Valparaíso. Nevertheless, he left the career after one year and joined to journalism at the Pontifical Catholic University of Chile in Santiago, graduating from there in 1973.

=== Events and TV ===
Since 1978, he has produced events. Among the marriages he has organized are those of Cecilia Bolocco, Marcelo Salas, Marcelo Ríos, Pamela Díaz or Horacio de la Peña.

In 1996, Cox began his TV career by animating the program La Revista de La Red for three years, which included an interview segment that eventually expanded into his own program called Cara a Cara in April 1999. Thus, he interviewed to people like Felipe Camiroaga, Felipe Cubillos, Martín Cárcamo or Pamela Jiles. The interview with the highest audience was the made in July 2003 to Tatiana Merino, vedette and actress; the program scored an average of 30 audience index points, reaching the highest in the history of that channel.
