= United States in the OTI Festival 1994 =

- OTI Festival 1994
- Participating broadcaster: Univision
- Country: United States
- Selection process: XVII Festival Nacional de la Canción OTI–Univision
- Selection date: 5 September 1994

Competing entry
- Song: "Ganas de gritar"
- Artist: Héctor Galaz
- Songwriter: Omar Sánchez

Placement
- Semi-final result: Qualified
- Final result: 11th, 0 points

Participation chronology
◄1993 •	1994	• 1995►

The United States was represented at the OTI Festival 1994 with the song "Ganas de gritar", written by Omar Sánchez, and performed by Héctor Galaz. The participating broadcaster representing the country, Univision, selected its entry through a national televised competition. The song, qualified from the semi-final, placed eleventh in the final with 0 points, tying for last place with the entry from Brazil.

== National stage ==
Univision held a national televised competition to select its entry for the 23rd edition of the OTI Festival. This was the seventeenth edition of the Festival Nacional de la Canción OTI–Univision. In the final, each song represented a Univision affiliate, each of which had selected its entry through a local pre-selection.

=== Los Angeles pre-selection ===
KMEX-TV held a pre-selection. This was the sixteenth edition of the Los Angeles Local OTI Festival. The winner, and therefore qualified for the national final, was "Cómo quiero a mi pueblo", written and performed by Hugo Alexandro Pedroza.

=== Final ===
The final was held on 5 September 1994 in Miami. It was broadcast live on all Univision affiliates. The winner was "Ganas de gritar", written by Omar Sánchez, and performed by Héctor Galaz.

Winner

Result of the final of the XVII Festival Nacional de la Canción OTI–Univision (Note: Incomplete list of the competing entries.)
R/O	Song	Artist	Songwriter(s)	Affiliate	Result
	"Ganas de gritar"	Héctor Galaz	Omar Sánchez		1
	"Cómo quiero a mi pueblo"	Hugo Alexandro Pedroza	Hugo Alexandro Pedroza	KMEX-TV–Los Angeles	

== At the OTI Festival ==
On 14–15 October 1994, the OTI Festival was held at Teatro Principal in Valencia, Spain, hosted by Televisión Española (TVE), and broadcast live throughout Ibero-America. Héctor Galaz performed "Ganas de gritar" in position 11 in the semi-final, qualifying for the final. At the end, the song placed eleventh in the final, tying with 0 points for last place with the entry from Brazil.
