= Janine Leal =

Venezuelan dietitian (born 1976)

- Born: Irene Bosch; November 13, 1976 (age 49); Caracas, Venezuela
- Occupations: Nutritionist, television presenter and model

Janine Leal Reyes (born 13 November 1976) is a Venezuelan nutritionist, television presenter and model. She ventured into television programs in Ecuador and Peru, becoming known as the main presenter of the Chilean television program Mujeres primero.

== Television ==
Year	Broadcast	Role	Channel	Ref
2003	Súper cuatro	Model	Venevisión	
2004-2008	Vamos con todo	Entertainer	RTS	
2005	Gran Hermano del Pacífico	Entertainer	RTS	
2009	Amor, amor, amor	Entertainer	Frecuencia Latina	
2010-2016	Mujeres primero	Entertainer	La Red	
2012	Mañaneros	Paneslist	La Red	
2013	Intrusos	Paneslist	La Red	
2014	Mañaneros	Substitute Presenter	La Red	
2014	Sin Dios ni Late	Herself (guest)	Zona Latina	
