= United States in the OTI Festival 1995 =

- OTI Festival 1995
- Participating broadcaster: Univision
- Country: United States
- Selection process: XVIII Festival Nacional de la Canción OTI–Univision

Competing entry
- Song: "Secreto de amor"
- Artist: Silvia Bezi
- Songwriter: José Villarreal

Placement
- Final result: Finalist

Participation chronology
◄1994 •	1995	• 1996►

The United States was represented at the OTI Festival 1995 with the song "Secreto de amor", written by José Villarreal, and performed by Silvia Bezi. The participating broadcaster representing the country, Univision, selected its entry through a national televised competition. The song, that was performed in position 8, was not among the top-three places revealed.

== National stage ==
Univision held a national televised competition to select its entry for the 24th edition of the OTI Festival. This was the eighteenth edition of the Festival Nacional de la Canción OTI–Univision. In the final, each song represented a Univision affiliate, each of which had selected its entry through a local pre-selection.

=== Tampa pre-selection ===
WBHS held a pre-selection. This was the twefth edition of the Tampa Local OTI Festival. The winner, and therefore qualified for the national final, was "Para salvar el mundo", written and performed by Rafael M. Más.

Qualifier

Result of the Local OTI Festival – Tampa 1995 (Note: Incomplete list of the competing entries.)
R/O	Song	Artist	Songwriter(s)	Result
	"Para salvar el mundo"	Rafael M. Más	Rafael M. Más	Qualified

=== Final ===
The final was held in Miami. It was broadcast live on all Univision affiliates. The winner was "Secreto de amor", written by José Villarreal, and performed by Silvia Bezi.

Winner

Result of the final of the XVIII Festival Nacional de la Canción OTI–Univision
R/O	Song	Artist	Songwriter(s)	Affiliate	Result
	"Secreto de amor"	Silvia Bezi	José Villarreal		1
	"Para salvar el mundo"	Rafael M. Más	Rafael M. Más	WBHS–Tampa	
	"Una vez más"	Joseph Diego	Raymond Kenetsky; Marlene Marín	KMEX-TV–Los Angeles	

== At the OTI Festival ==
On 11 November 1995, the OTI Festival was held at the Anfiteatro José Asunción Flores in San Bernardino, Paraguay, hosted by Teledifusora Paraguaya, and broadcast live throughout Ibero-America. Silvia Bezi performed "Secreto de amor" in position 8, with Roy Velásquez conducting the event's orchestra. The song was not among the top-three places revealed at the end.
