= Piel a Piel =

Studio album by Marcos Llunas
- Released: 1994
- Studios: Ocean Way Recording; Skip Saylor Recording; Sound Chamber Recorders (Hollywood, CA)
- Genre: Latin pop
- Length: 43:54
- Language: Spanish
- Label: PolyGram Latino
- Producer: Juan Carlos Calderón

Marcos Llunas chronology
Marcos Llunas (1993)	Piel a Piel (1994)	Vida (1996)

Singles from Piel a Piel
- 1. "Guapa" Released: 1995; 2. "Mañana" Released: 1995; 3. "La de Siempre" Released: 1995

Piel a Piel (transl. Skin To Skin) is the second studio album by Spanish singer Marcos Llunas, released in 1994 by PolyGram Latino. The album was produced and mainly written by Spanish singer-songwriter Juan Carlos Calderón, and was promoted by its lead singles "Guapa", "Mañana" and "La de Siempre". The album sold 80,000 copies in Mexico in 1994

== Track listing ==
All tracks are written by Juan Carlos Calderón, except where noted.

No.	Title	Writer(s)	Length
1.	"La de Siempre"		3:28
2.	"Amigos"		4:30
3.	"Sobredosis de Ti"		3:35
4.	"No me Digas"		4:35
5.	"Guapa"		4:17
6.	"Algo de Ti"		3:29
7.	"Estoy Cansado de Esperar"		4:30
8.	"Mañana"		4:25
9.	"Sedúceme"		3:05
10.	"Será"	Marcos Llunas	4:03
11.	"Entre la Espada y la Pared"	Ricardo Arjona	3:33
Total length:			43:54

== Personnel ==
Adapted from the Piel a Piel liner notes:

=== Performance credits ===
- Marcos Llunas – vocals, arranger
- Robbie Buchanan – piano, keyboards, programing
- Pablo Aguirre – piano, keyboards, programing
- John "J.R." Robinson – drums
- Abraham Laboriel – bass
- Neil Stubenhaus – bass
- Michael Landau – electric guitar
- George Doering – acoustic guitar
- Luis Conte – percussion
- Dan Higgins – saxophone, flute, synthesizer
- Francis Benítez – background vocals
- Leyla Hoyle – background vocals
- Kenny OBrian – background vocals
- Isela Sotelo – background vocals
- Mary Jamison – background vocals
- Michael Markman – concert master, violin
- Olga Babtchinskaia – violin
- Walter Gomes Desouza – violin
- James Getzoff – violin
- Edith Markman – violin
- Hakop Mekinian – violin
- Dennis Molchan – violin
- R.F. Peterson – violin
- Guillermo Romero – violin
- Radzan Kuyumijan – violin
- Thi B. Nyugen – violin
- Tania Boyaird – violin
- Vage Ayrikyan – cello
- Waldemar de Almeida – cello
- Virginia Burward-Hoy – cello, viola
- Armen Ksadjikian – cello, viola
- Jorge Moraga – viola
- Harry Shirinian – viola
- Hershel Wise – viola
- Diane Gilbert – viola

=== Technical credits ===
- Juan Carlos Calderón – producer, arranger, director, choir arrangements
- Christina Abaroa – arranger, coordination, producer
- Alejandro Monroy – director, arranger
- Manuel Calderón – artistic direction
- Randy Kerber – strings arrangements
- Andy Armer – strings arrangements
- Mary Jamison – choir arrangements
- Benny Faccone – engineer
- Hal Sacks – engineer
- Bryan Stott – engineer
- Rodolfo Vásquez – engineer
- Moogie Canazio – mixer
- Mauricio Guerrero – additional engineer
- Bernie Grundman – mastering engineer
- Manuel Oriona – photography
- Javier Romero – graphic design

=== Recording and mixing locations ===
- Ocean Way Recording Studios, Hollywood, CA – recording
- Skip Saylor Recording, Hollywood, CA - recording
- Sound Chamber Recorders, Hollywood, CA – recording
- Studio Masters, Los Angeles, CA – recording
- Westlake Recording Studios, Hollywood, CA – mixing
