= Marcos Llunas =

Spanish singer-songwriter

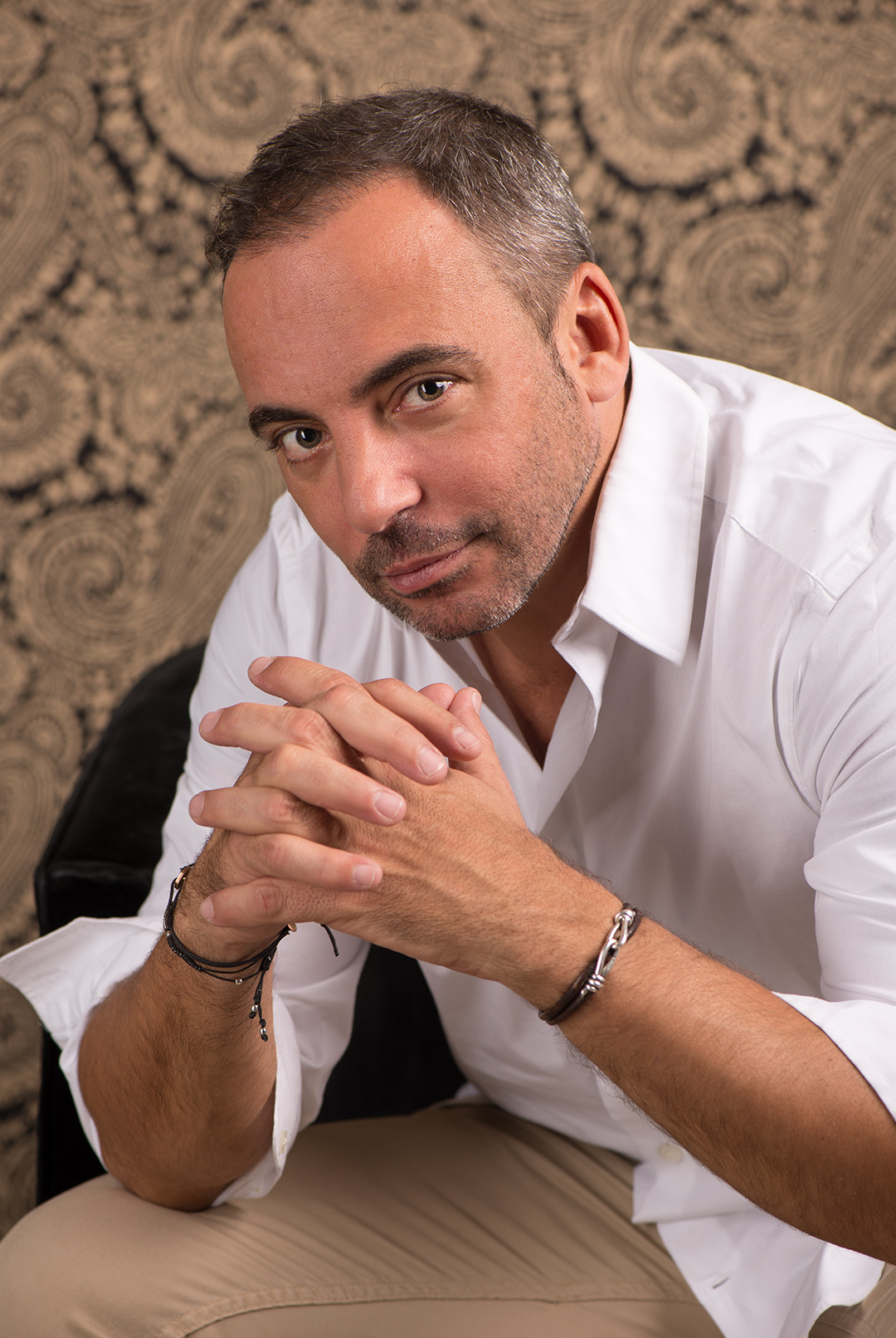
- Llunas in 2016

Background information
- Born: Marcos Gómez Llunas; 29 September 1971 (age 54); Madrid, Spain
- Genres: Pop, Latino
- Occupation: Singer
- Years active: 1989–present
- Website: www.marcosllunas.com

Marcos Gómez Llunas (born 29 September 1971), better known as Marcos Llunas, is a Spanish singer-songwriter, known in Spain and Latin America. His debut single "Para reconquistarte" reached the No.1 spot all over Hispanic America. He won the OTI Festival 1995 and placed sixth in the Eurovision Song Contest 1997, both representing Spain. Llunas is the son of singer Dyango and the father of the singer turned actor Izan Llunas.

== Career ==
Llunas, son of Spanish singer Dyango, released his self-titled first album in 1993. His biggest hit was "Para reconquistarte", it became a smash-hit all over Hispanic America during the whole 1993, it peaked at the number one position and spent several weeks at the top in Argentina, Mexico, Chile and Uruguay. He later recorded several successful singles.

In 1995, Llunas was chosen internally by broadcaster Televisión Española (TVE) as its representative for the 24th edition of the OTI Festival with the song "Eres mi debilidad", written by Alejandro Abad. At the contest, held in San Bernardino, Paraguay on 11 November, he finished in first place, winning the contest. Also in 1995, he was nominated for a Lo Nuestro Award for Pop New Artist of the Year at the 7th Lo Nuestro Awards.

In 1997, Llunas was chosen internally by TVE as its representative for the 42nd edition of the Eurovision Song Contest with his self-penned song "Sin rencor". At the contest, held in Dublin on 3 May, "Sin rencor" finished in sixth place of the twenty-five entries.

In the years following his Eurovision appearance, Llunas recorded in Portuguese and Catalan in addition to Spanish, and became particularly successful in Latin American markets. He released a career retrospective album in 2004. Between 2002 and 2007 he made appearances as a juror on Spanish television talent shows Operación Triunfo and Lluvia de estrellas.

In 2007, he was one of the contestants on the Mexican talent show Disco de oro, a competition between successful singers from different decades that aired on TV Azteca

In 2012, he released an album that paid tribute to his father Dyango.

Marcos Llunas was deeply involved in Latin America and to this day his music is all the rage in countries like Chile, Peru, Argentina, Mexico, Paraguay.

== Albums discography ==
- 1993: Marcos Llunas
- 1994: Piel a Piel
- 1996: Vida
- 1997: Mi Historia
- 1999: Pluja d'estels
- 1999: Desnudo
- 2002: Me gusta
- 2003: Hechicera
- 2004: Mi retrato
- 2012: La voz del alma: Marcos Llunas a Dyango

Preceded by Ana María Gonzalez with "Cuestión de suerte"	Spain in the OTI Festival; 1995	Succeeded by Anabel Russ with "Mis manos"
Preceded by Claudia Carenzio with "Canción despareja"	OTI Festival winner 1995	Succeeded by Anabel Russ with "Mis manos"
Preceded by Antonio Carbonell with "¡Ay, qué deseo!"	Spain in the Eurovision Song Contest; 1997	Succeeded by Mikel Herzog with "¿Qué voy a hacer sin ti?"
