= Zé Renato =

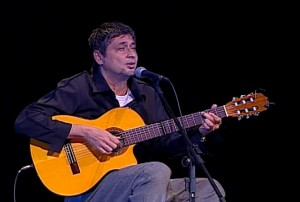
Zé Renato

Zé Renato (born José Renato Botelho Moschkovich in Vitória, Espírito Santo, April 1, 1956) is a Brazilian singer, songwriter, and guitarist.

He has released many albums and his songs have been recorded by Milton Nascimento, Jon Anderson, Leila Pinheiro, Lulu Santos, Nana Caymmi, MPB-4, and Boca Livre. He represented Brazil in the OTI Festival 1994 with the song "Mulher".

== Discography ==
- 1981 - Fonte da Vida (Fountain of Life)
- 1984 - Luz e mistério (Light and mystery)
- 1988 - Pegadas (Footprints)
- 1990 - Zil as a member of the band Zil
- 1994 - Arranha Céu (Skyscraper)
- 1995 - Natural do Rio de Janeiro
- 1997 - A alegria continua
- 1998 - Silvio Caldas 90 anos-Zé Renato e Orquestra
- 1999 - Cabô
- 2001 - Filosofia
- 2002 - Memorial. Wagner Tiso e Zé Renato
- 2003 - Minha praia
- 2007 - Zé Renato - Ao vivo
- 2008 - É tempo de amar
