= Andrea Tessa =

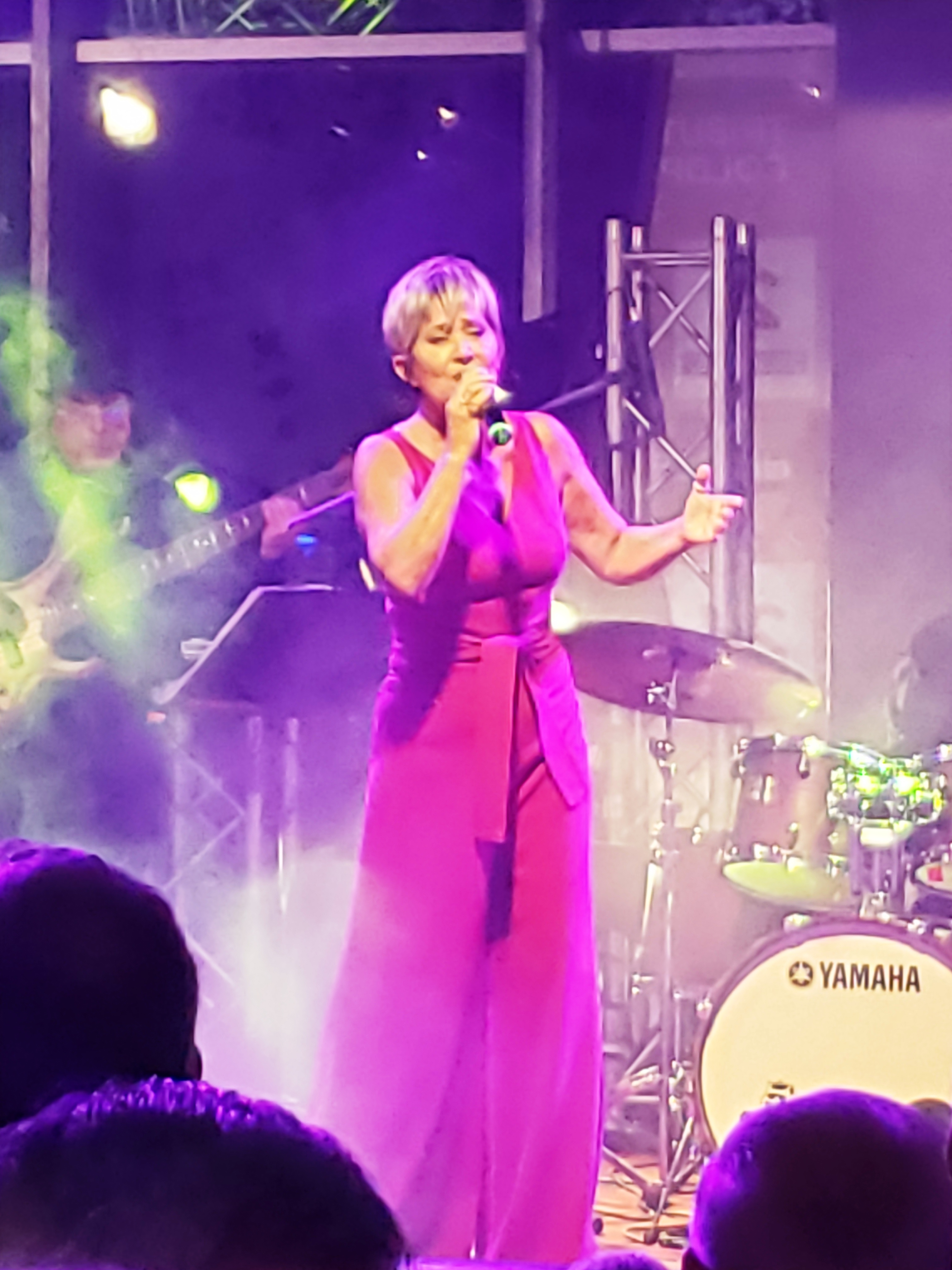
- Andrea Tessa performing live.

Background information
- Born: Andrea Marisa Victoria Tessa Vergara; January 1, 1961 (age 65); Santiago, Chile
- Genres: Latin pop, jazz
- Occupations: Singer, songwriter, tv presener
- Instrument: Vocals
- Years active: 1979–present
- Website: www.andreatessa.com

Andrea Marisa Victoria Tessa Vergara (born January 1, 1961, in Santiago) is a Chilean singer-songwriter, TV presenter, and actress of Italian descent. Daughter of the operatic soprano Victoria Vergara Olguín and Patricio Tessa Marchant. She studied at Scuola Italiana de Santiago.

She started her musical career in 1979, singing "Decir te Quiero", a song written by Scottie Scott, winning for Best Interpreter at the Viña del Mar International Song Festival.

Her first album was Páginas (1996), followed by Equipaje Clandestino (2002), Tribute (2007) and Leaving Home (2008) which won Best Album of the Year in the 2011 APES awards.

She was the host of the television show Más Música from 1984 to 1992. In 1989 she debuted as an actress in the TV movie Bravo. She appeared as the vocal coach of the Italian chorus (Italian immigrants or descendants) in the TV show Todos a Coro hosted by Rafael Araneda and Karen Doggenweiler. She and her chorus won second place.

== Discography ==
- Páginas (1996)
- Equipaje Clandestino (2002)
- Concierto de Oraciones (2004)
- Tribute (2007)
- Leaving Home (2008)

== Filmography ==
- Bravo (1989) (TV)
