= Teatro Nacional Cervantes =

Theatre in Buenos Aires, Argentina

Coordinates: 34°35′56″S 58°23′1.7″W

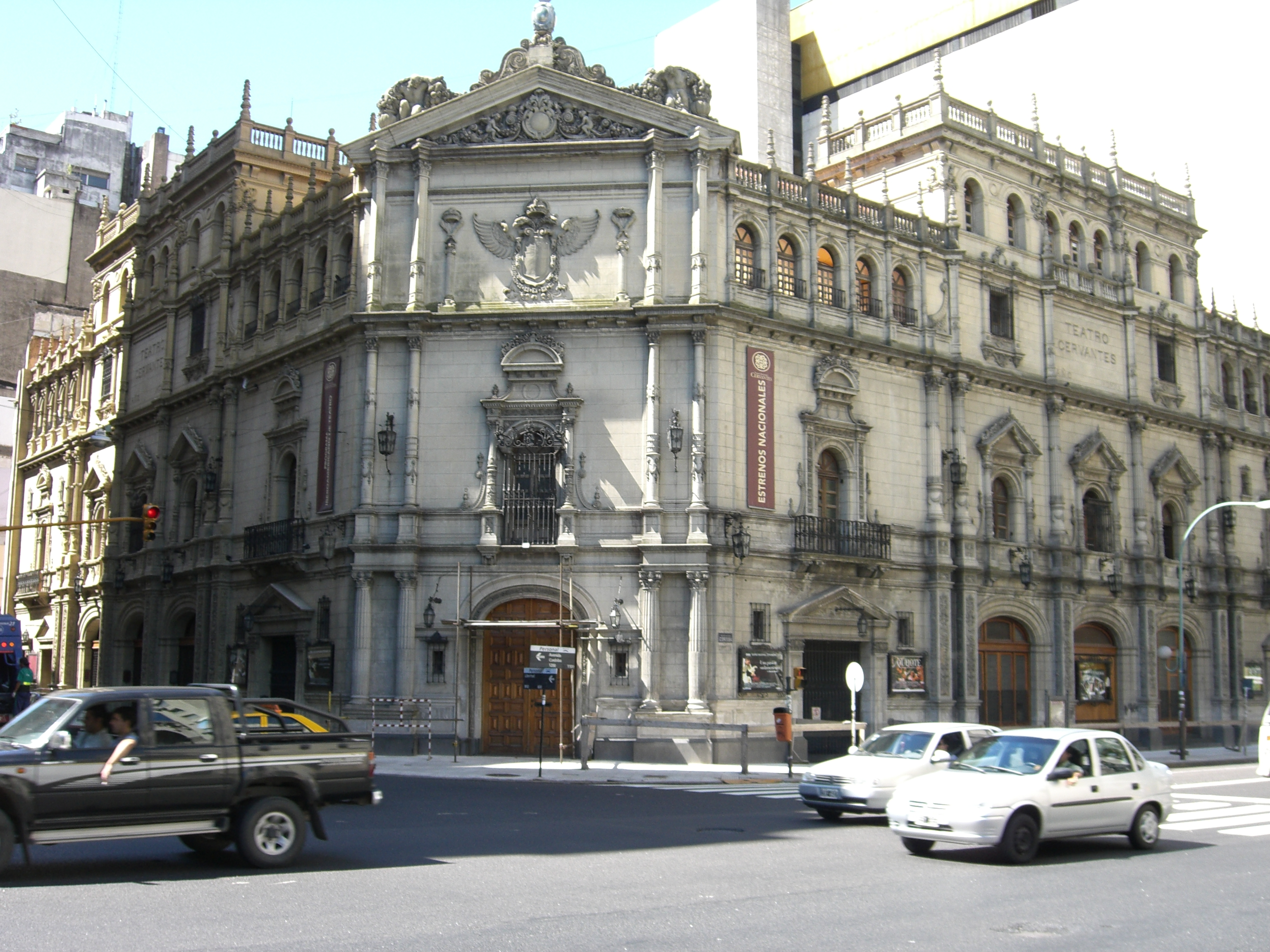
The Cervantes Theatre, Buenos Aires.

The Teatro Nacional Cervantes in Buenos Aires is the national stage and comedy theatre of Argentina.

== Overview ==
Located on Córdoba Avenue and two blocks north of Buenos Aires' renowned opera house, the Colón Theatre, the Cervantes houses three performance halls. The María Guerrero Salon is the theatre's main hall. Its 456 m^{2} (4,900 ft^{2}) stage features a 12 m (39 ft) rotating circular platform and can be extended by a further 2.7 m (9 ft). The Guerrero Salon can seat 860 spectators, including 512 in the galleries. A secondary hall, the Orestes Caviglia Salon, can seat 150 and is mostly reserved for chamber music concerts. The Luisa Vehíl Salon is a multipurpose room known for its extensive gold leaf decor.

== History ==
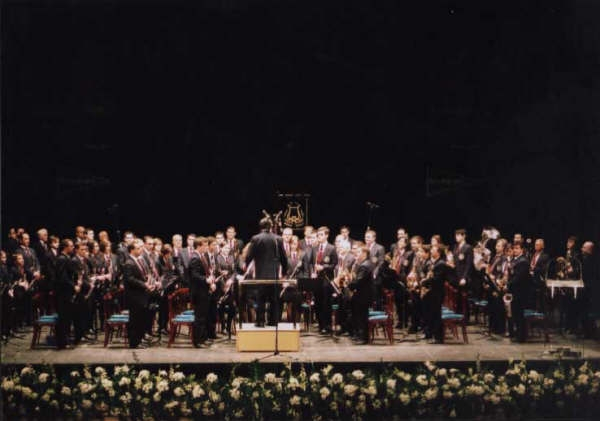
The stage in the María Guerrero Salon.

The Cervantes Theatre of Buenos Aires owes its existence, in part, to the 1897 relocation to Argentina of Spanish theatre producer María Guerrero and her company, who popularized professional stage theatre in Argentina. A commercial success at the Teatro Odeón, her adaptations of classics in Spanish literature took her to theatres nationwide. Following the opening of a number of large, ornate opera houses and stage theatres in Argentina, Guerrero and her husband, Fernando Díaz de Mendoza, set aside a share of their fortune in 1918 for the creation of their own grand theatre house. The project caught the attention of both local high society and the King of Spain, Alfonso XIII, who collaborated with its construction by commissioning artisanal fixtures, material and elements of stagecraft for the theatre, built accordingly in Spanish baroque style and named in honor of Spain's legendary novelist and dramatist, Miguel de Cervantes.

The Cervantes Theatre was inaugurated on September 5, 1921, with a production of Lope de Vega's La dama boba (The Foolish Lady). The proliferation of theatres in Buenos Aires and the advent of the radio in Argentina soon eroded the Cervantes' audience base, however, and in 1926, the couple was forced to auction the institution. Lamenting this turn of events, National Music Conservatory Assistant Director Enrique García Velloso persuaded President Marcelo Torcuato de Alvear, whose wife, Regina Pacini, had been an opera chanteuse and was an avid patroness of the arts, to create the National Stage Theatre at the ailing Cervantes. The theatre also became home of the National Comedy Theatre in 1933. A massive fire in 1961 nearly destroyed the Cervantes, a misfortune leading to the aging house's extensive modernization, including the construction of a 17-story annex. The main hall itself was rebuilt according to its original specifications and the renovated institution reopened in 1968. Tireless advocacy on the part of Lito Cruz, stage director, actor and one of the best-known figures in Argentine cinema and theatre, led to Congressional passage of a National Theatre Law in 1997, providing yearly subsidies for the art and for the designation of the Cervantes itself as an official entity.

On 19 November 1988, the theater hosted the OTI Festival 1988.

== Gallery ==
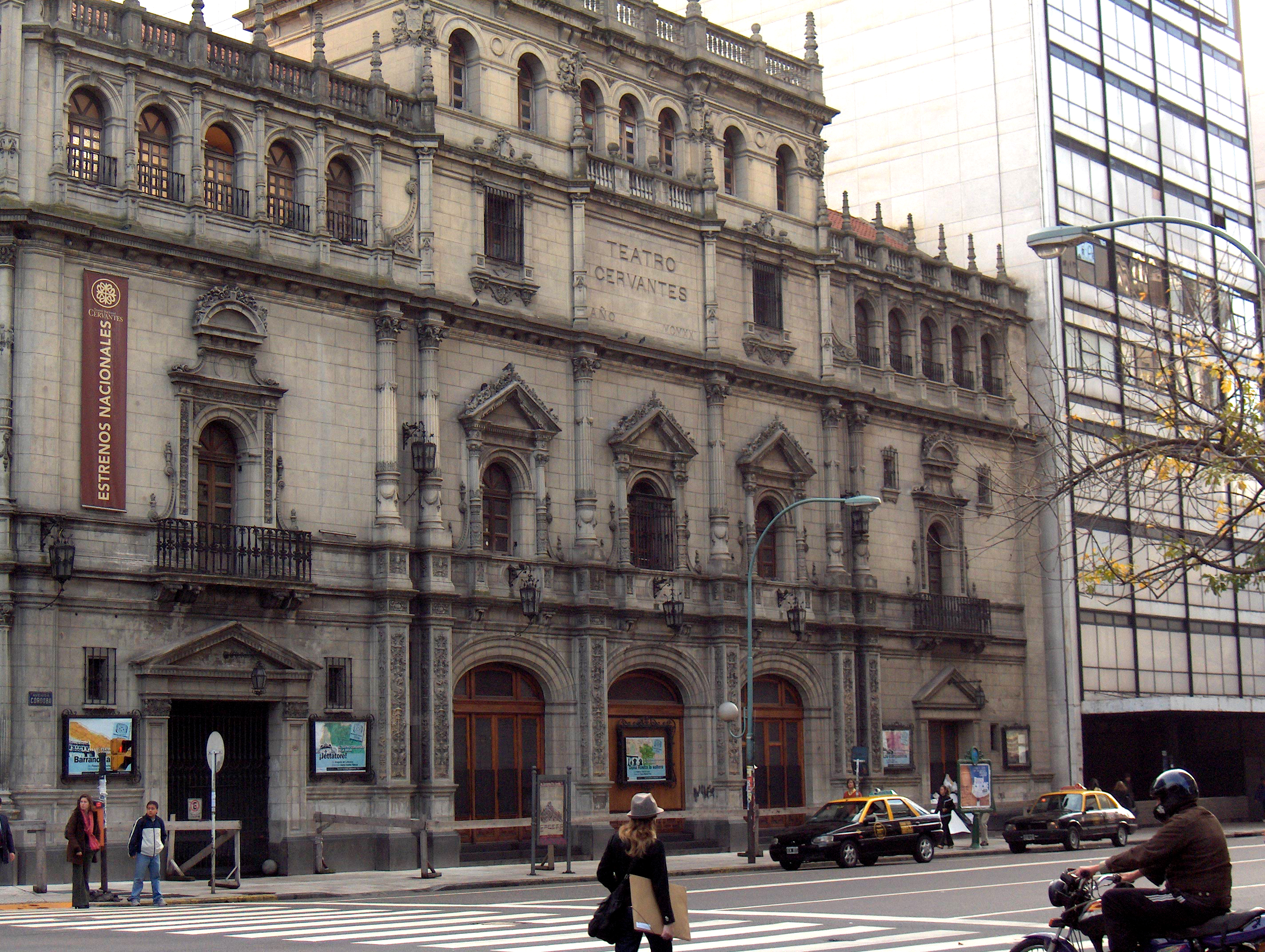
