= Laura Canoura =

Laura Canoura Sande
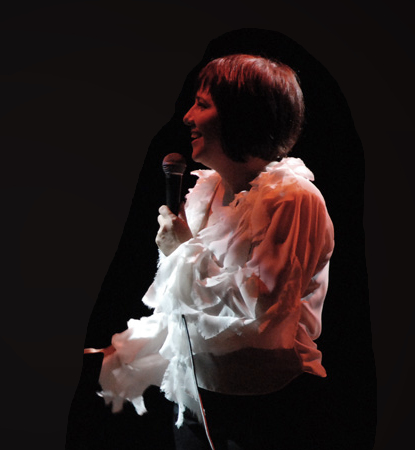
- Born: Laura Canoura; January 2, 1957 (age 69) Montevideo, Uruguay
- Occupation: Singer, composer

Laura Canoura Sande (born 2 January 1957) is a singer and composer of popular Uruguayan music. She is considered one of the most renowned female solo artists in Uruguay.

== Biography ==
=== Early career ===
Canoura was born in Montevideo to José Coco Canoura, the son of a Galician immigrant, and his wife Carmen Pocha Sande. In 1978 she finished her studies in theater at the school of actors Roberto Fontana and Nelly Goitiño. Shortly afterward, her participation in the Conservatorio del Núcleo de Estudios Musicales gave her the opportunity to meet several musicians with whom she would form the group Rumbo.

=== Rumbo ===
==== Beginnings ====
In early 1979, her connection began with musicians Mauricio Ubal, Gonzalo Moreira, Gustavo Ripa, Miguel López, and Carlos Vicente, which led to the founding of the musical group Rumbo. They offered their first performance in the Teatro Astral in June 1979.

Their first full-length recording, entitled "Para abrir la noche," was edited by the label Ayuí / Tacuabé in 1980. In the following years, they edited the two other albums that would make up their discography: "Sosteniendo la pared" in 1982 and "Otro tiempo" in 1985 and offered concerts around Uruguay, performing on several occasions in Buenos Aires, as well.

==== Esa Tristeza ====
Throughout 1984 and parallel to her career in Rumbo, Canoura began work on a solo album, which featured the artistic production of Jaime Roos and the musical support of the group Repique, which was made up of Andrés Recagno, Alberto Magnone, Gustavo Etchenique, and Carlos "Boca" Ferreira. This work was completed the following year with the release of Canoura's first solo album, "Esa Tristeza."

==== Breakup ====
During the band's eight years together, it was subject to censure by the civic-military Uruguayan dictatorship. This censorship was manifested in the cancellation of concerts, or the elimination of parts of the credits from their first Phonogram due to the ban on such authors as Mario Benedetti, Adela Gleijer, and Diana Reches.

In 1987, Rumbo broke up, beginning the prolific personal careers of Ubal and Canoura. Beginning in the middle of 1987 and throughout the following year, Canoura resumes her artistic activity, performing alongside Esteban Klísich and Mauricio Ubal in two series of shows in Montevideo which received a large public response.

=== Las Tres ===
In late 1988, Canoura began performances of the show "Las tres" alongside Estela Magnone and Mariana Ingold (who yielded her spot shortly thereafter to Flavia Ripa). "Las tres" was a show presented at La Barranca, where each musician performed her own repertoire, accompanied by the other two group members, as well as three other musicians. The album from this show would be edited the following year, achieving a level of sales that would earn it gold status.

=== Solo career ===
Following the success of this show, Canoura decided to form her own band and re-launch her album "Esa Tristeza," which, due to Repique's lack of free dates, had never been performed live.

In 1990 and 1991, the artist offered successful performances of this album in several places throughout Uruguay, including several performances at the Solís Theatre in Montevideo. The album made it to the top spots among the country's most sold albums, achieving gold and platinum status. This made Canoura the first female artist to achieve these recognitions.

==== "Puedes oírme" ====
In late 1991, she edited her second solo album, entitled "Puedes oírme," produced by Jaime Roos. This album, edited in vinyl and cassette, was released shortly thereafter as a CD that also included her first solo album. This CD earned golden status.

The following year, Canoura represented Uruguay in the Expo Sevilla (1992) with the video of the song "Detrás del miedo". In mid-1992, she represented Uruguay on the program ¡Y Vero América va!, by Mexican singer and actress Verónica Castro.

==== Las cosas que aprendí en los discos ====
In March 1993, at the Film Festival of the City of Montevideo, the music video of the song "Todo lo que quiero" was awarded the first prize. Another video clip that achieved success was "Nada vale más" from the album edited the previous year, "Las cosas que aprendí en los discos", for which Canoura was invited to participate in the international programming of MTV.

In June, Canoura performed in the Memorial of Latin America in San Pablo, and at the end of the year, she was awarded the Fabini Award for best pop singer at the Solís Theater.

==== Locas pasiones ====
Together with Hugo Fattoruso, Canoura performed the show "Locas Pasiones" at the Solís Theater. The show was recorded live and edited on CD. This disk consisted of a repertoire of boleros and tangos, which was the singer's first endeavor in tango.

Canoura later received a new invitation to represent Uruguay, this time in the OTI Festival 1994 held in Valencia.

==== Piaf ====
Culminating in 1994, Canoura carried out a series of performances with the Symphonic Band of the City of Montevideo. Omar Varela, director of the Italia Fausta theater company, offered her the lead role playing French actress Edith Piaf in a musical/theatrical work based on the book by English author Pam Gems.

Receiving good public and critical response, the play was performed for an extensive season the following year.

==== Interior ====
In 1996, she concentrated completely on the recording of her album Interior, for which she invited other important Uruguayan artists, with some of whom she had shared previous projects. This work marked her debut as a composer. Following this, she received an invitation from Federico García Vigil, the Director of the Montevideo Philharmonic Orchestra, to participate in a new edition of the show Tango Galas. The show brought together the orchestra's stringed instruments, piano, guitar, bandoneons, singers, and dancers.

== Discography ==
=== Studio albums ===
- Para abrir la noche (with Rumbo. Ayuí / Tacuabé a/e26. 1980)
- Sosteniendo la pared (with Rumbo. Ayuí / Tacuabé a/e35. 1982)
- Esa tristeza (Orfeo SULP 90764. 1985)
- Otro tiempo (with Rumbo. Orfeo SULP 90788. 1985)
- Planetario (with Esteban Klisich. Ayuí / Tacuabé. 1989)
- Las tres (with Las tres. Orfeo 91011–4. 1989)
- Puedes oírme (Orfeo 91140–4. 1991)
- Las cosas que aprendí en los discos (Orfeo CDO 017–2. 1992)
- Locas pasiones (with Hugo Fattoruso. Orfeo CDO 052–2. 1994)
- Piaf (Orfeo CDO 087–2. 1995)
- Interior (Orfeo 91368–4. 1996)
- Pasajeros permanentes (Warner Music Group. 1998)
- Esencia (with Jorge Nocetti. Bizarro Records 2354–2. 2001)
- Mujeres como yo (Warner Music Group. 2001)
- Bolero (Warner Music Group. 2003)
- Esencia / Dos (with Jorge Nocetti and Sebastián Larrosa. Bizarro Records. 2005)
- Canoura canta el tango (Bizarro Records. 2007)
- Las canciones de Piaf (Bizarro Records. 2009)
- Un amor del bueno (Bizarro Records. 2010)
- CANOURA Colección histórica (Bizarro Records. 2011)

=== Collective albums ===
- Tiempo de cantar 2 (with Rumbo. Ayuí / Tacuabé a/e23. 1980)
- A redoblar (with Rumbo. Ayuí / Tacuabé a/e33. 1982)
- Adempu canta vol. I (with Rumbo. RCA. 1984)
- 7 Solistas (Ayuí / Tacuabé a/e72k. 1988)
- La Barraca en vivo (Orfeo 91050–4. 1990)
- Marinero en tierra (Warner Music Group. 1998)
- Cerro Alegre (Warner Music Group. 1999)
- Sabor a ti (Warner Music Group. 1999)
- Entre dos (Warner Music Group. 2003)

=== Collaborations ===
- Pájaros (Rubén Olivera) (Ayuí / Tacuabé. 1981)
- De puerta en puerta (Washington Carrasco and Cristina Fernández) (RCA. 1981)
- Mediocampo (Jaime Roos) (Orfeo. 1984)
- Credenciales (Fernando Yañez) (Orfeo. 1985)
- Como el clavel del aire (Mauricio Ubal. Ayuí / Tacuabé. 1989)
- Estamos rodeados (Jaime Roos. Orfeo. 1991)
- Concierto por la vida (Rubén Rada. Orfeo. 1994)
- Javier Silvera (Javier Silvera. Warner Music Group. 2004)
- Omar (Omar. Bizarro Records. 2004)

=== Reissues and rereleases ===
- Puedes oirme / Esa tristeza (disc containing her first solo works. Orfeo CDO 008–2. 1991)
- Para abrir la noche (with Rumbo. Ayuí / Tacuabé pd 2001. 1999)
- Rumbo (con Rumbo. Double disc containing the three LPs of the group and collective participations. Ayuí / Tacuabé ae229-230cde. 2003)
- Mujeres como yo (launched for Spain with two bonus tracks. 2003)
- Veinticinco (Bizarro Records. 2004)
- Las canciones de Piaf (re-edition of the disc "Piaf" which includes new themes. Bizarro Records. 2009)
