= La Red (Chilean TV channel) =

Chilean national television channel

- Type: Free-to-air television network
- Country: Chile
- Broadcast area: National
- Headquarters: Avenida Quilín #3750, Macul

Programming
- Picture format: 1080i HDTV

Ownership
- Owner: Compañia Chilena de Televisión (Albavisión)
- Sister channels: Telecanal

History
- Founded: 1991
- Launched: 12 May 1991; 35 years ago
- Former names: La Red (1991–1999); Red Chilena de Televisión (1999–2009)

Links
- Webcast: Watch live
- Website: www.lared.cl

Availability

Terrestrial
- Digital UHF: Listings may vary

La Red (lit. 'The Network'), is a private television channel in Chile. It began broadcasting on 12 May 1991, as the second private television station in Chile, after Mega.

From 1991 to 2014, the channel operated in facilities adjacent to the Chilefilms complex in Las Condes. In 2014, it opened its own production complex ubicated in Macul, which has three studios.

La Red is owned by Albavisión, owned by low-profile media mogul Remigio Ángel González; its parent company, Compañía Chilena de Televisión, is owned by two figurehead companies, Televideo Chile S.A. y MLC Inversiones S.A., whose executive director is the same as La Red. Televideo Chile is made up of several foreign entities, including foreign Albavisión stations: Belleville Investments Ltda., Televideo Services Inc., Prolasa, Televisora Cerro Cora, Andina de Radiodifusión S.A.C. and Aidesa S.A.

The channel's financial operations in 2024 have been positive, but were possible due to loans from its parent company.

== History ==
=== 1990-1999: Beginnings and changes in administration ===
On January 20, 1990, the Government called for a tender for private entities to be awarded the concession and operation of ten radio stations nationwide. One of these – Channel 4 in San José de Maipo, then a repeater of Televisión Nacional de Chile (Televisión Nacional de Chile) – was awarded to the company formed by Jaime Castro y Compañía (1%) and ChileFilms Artes y Comunicaciones S.A. (99%), which offered 1.2 million US dollars for the frequency.

After test broadcasts during the first months of 1991, official broadcasts began on May 12 of that year, with Sergio Melnick as the station's general manager. Since then, it has stood out for being the first channel to incorporate stable public service programs into its programming.

It was long considered a "breeding ground" for presenters, as its personalities were soon hired by major national channels such as TVN and Canal 13, as in the case of Kike Morandé, Eli de Caso, Raúl Alcaíno and Mauricio Israel, among others.

From its inception, this channel also established a News Department, its first news program being "Noticias en La Red" (News on the Net), which aired four times daily, in addition to hourly news bulletins. Its first newscast aired on May 12, 1991, and was anchored by journalist María Inés Alliende, who came from Televisión Nacional de Chile (National Television of Chile). The channel also broadcast some of the programming from the Empresa de Comunicaciones Orbitales (ECO) network, owned by Televisa.

In the 1990s, La Red was characterized by its continuous changes in management, through which Copesa, the Canadian Canwest (now Shaw Communications), businessman Jorge Mackenna Vergara (then representative of Rafael Araneda, who hosted "Revolvándola") and the Mexican multimedia conglomerate TV Azteca paraded, resulting in multiple renewals of its corporate image, changes in programming and very poor audience results.

Despite constant administrative turnover, the station acquired the broadcasting rights for the 1998 FIFA World Cup Qualifiers, which it eventually resold to TVN in 1996 due to the deplorable economic and administrative state of the latter. During this period, highlights included football analysis with Eduardo Bonvallet and the television debut of commentator Claudio Palma.

=== 1999-2006: Arrival of Albavisión ===
However, with the arrival of Albavisión at the station and with former Mega programming manager José Manuel Larraín as executive director, The Network began to experience its best period, specifically from August 1999.

The channel's programming lineup has been boosted thanks to an exclusive agreement with Televisa, allowing it to premiere telenovelas such as "Camila", "Alondra", and "Abrázame muy fuerte", in addition to securing the exclusive rights to Chespirito's shows (except for "El Chavo del 8", whose exclusivity was held by Mega until 2017 and then by TVN from 2019 until mid-2020 and again from 2024).

Another strategy that allowed La Red to improve its programming was the exclusive broadcast on free-to-air television of several blockbuster films of the time, such as the Harry Potter saga, whose broadcast earned it high audience ratings during prime time.

In addition, he revitalized his press department, renaming the news programs as "Telediario (Chilean news program)" and introducing interactive participation with viewers, as well as creating various news programs such as "Hoy día" or "Hoy en La Red".

Also within its programming, La Red aired the first seasons of the Telemundo program "Sala de parejas" (now "Caso cerrado"), hosted by Dr. Ana María Polo, between 2002 and 2007. In 2007, the contract between the channel and Telemundo ended, and the program was subsequently broadcast by Mega. La Red was the first Chilean channel to acquire Dr. Polo's program, which later aired on other Chilean television channels.

=== 2009-2014: Consolidation ===
Between 2009 and 2010, La Red once again experienced a lamentable period in terms of both finances and viewership: much of its programming consisted of pre-recorded series, soap operas, and films, interspersed with very few live programs. In an attempt to revitalize the struggling channel, on March 9, 2009, Red Televisión reverted to its original name, "La Red".

To reverse this situation, in August 2010 Javier Urrutia Urzúa took over as executive director of the channel, who until mid-2010 was general manager of the Peruvian television channel Latina. José Manuel Larraín, meanwhile, assumes the presidency of the board.

His arrival resulted in a sustained increase in national programming, highlighting the change of schedule for programs such as "Intrusos"; the creation of new ones, such as the magazine "Mujeres primero"; the reopening of the news department, with "Noticias en La Red" with Felipe Vidal and "Hora 20", an opinion news program with Alejandro Guillier and Beatriz Sánchez, among others.

In January 2011, Expediente S debuted, hosted by Juan Andrés Salfate, and the star show Mentiras verdaderas, initially hosted by Eduardo Fuentes Silva; in addition, the car segment "Tacoma TV" is included. During that year, the channel broadcast the successful Colombian telenovela "Yo soy Betty, la fea", which increased the channel's viewership during its broadcast with historic audience ratings: the episodes averaged 9 to 10 points, reaching a historic peak of 16.5 points during the final episode of the telenovela.

The acquisition of the Mexican melodrama series "La Rosa de Guadalupe" also gave the channel high ratings, positioning it as the leader in its time slot and among young viewers. La Red also broadcasts the "María Trilogy", comprising the Televisa telenovelas "María Mercedes", "Marimar", and "María la del Barrio", starring Mexican actress, singer, and model Thalía, with the latter two being the most successful.

These new additions to the lineup join the station's local productions, such as "Cada día mejo" and "Mesa reservada" with Alfredo Lamadrid; "Mañaneros", hosted by Magdalena Montes; "Así somos," with Juan José Gurruchaga; the game show "Llámame"; "Cara a cara", the interview show hosted by Tomás Cox; the short segment "Cita con la historia", and "El tiempo en La Red". In August 2011, it launched its website and online signal lared.cl.

Despite the programming push, La Red continued in fifth place in audience, but with peaks of two and three rating points; even achieving high ratings in programs such as "Mentiras verdaderas" or "Así Somos", which occasionally scored over 7 online audience points.

=== 2014-2019: New television studies and crisis ===
In November 2012, Javier Urrutia announced that during the second half of 2013, La Red would move to new facilities in the commune of Macul, on the land that previously housed the warehouses and distribution center of the Roche laboratory in Chile, located on Avenida Quilín; this, after discarding the tender for the Chilevisión studios in Providencia due to problems in the process, and burying the possibility of occupying land acquired at the beginning of the decade in Ciudad Empresarial.

The investment reached US$15 million, and included the purchase of the 20,000 m² plot of land, the remodeling and adaptation of the main building, and the construction of three studios equipped with high-definition television technology that together total 1,286 m²; an area 30% larger than the previous ones of the television station.

The new television center began test broadcasts on January 6, 2014, transmitting "Mujeres primero", "Mañaneros", and "Intrusos en la televisión" from the complex's gardens. This marked the beginning of the end of the lease on the building at 1201 Manquehue Sur Avenue in Las Condes—owned by Chilefilms—which had delayed the channel's technological upgrade.

The complete transition to the Macul complex took place in April 2014. Following the departure of La Red, the studios at Manquehue Sur 1201 were leased to Chilefilms by Mega as a temporary base for its drama and reality TV departments; interior scenes of the telenovelas "Pituca sin lucas" and "Papá a la deriva" were filmed there until the opening of the new facilities on Av. Vicuña Mackenna.

Later that same year, a few months later, the channel submitted its resignation to the Anatel, however, it continued to broadcast some national programs, such as the Teletón.

After registering losses of 4 billion Chilean pesos in the previous fiscal year due to the high costs of technological renewal and intense competition in the national television industry, in mid-April 2015 Urrutia justified a surprising cancellation of programs and the departure of personalities from the channel in an interview with La Tercera, announcing that "if the market does not recover, it is possible that I may have to make that decision with respect to other programs." On April 30, the changes to the national programming schedule and the closure of the news department were made public, accompanied by the dismissal of on-air personalities and 25 production and technical staff. Among those dismissed were journalist Felipe Vidal, who had been with the station for 20 years, and the cancellation of "Vigilantes," hosted by Nicolás Copano, who tearfully finished the final episode. The news programs "Hora 20" and "Hora 07"—the latter presented by Beatriz Sánchez and Verónica Franco—were replaced by Chespirito, telenovelas, and imported foreign series, respectively.

After seven years in charge of the station, on May 10, 2017, Urrutia resigned as executive director of La Red, remaining in the position until May 30. El cargo fue asumido de forma interina por la gerenta general Isabel Boegeholz hasta 2018, cuando regresa José Manuel Larraín a la dirección ejecutiva.

On August 21, 2018, La Red rejoined the National Television Association (Anatel) after more than four years outside the organization. In mid-2019, it reactivated its news department with the premiere of Punto Noticias, initially without a fixed broadcast schedule, consisting only of news previews during regular programming and special broadcasts, such as those covering the solar eclipse of July 2, 2019, and the 2019 protests in Chile. Finally, a new edition debuted at 2:30 p.m., which was moved to 1:00 p.m. in December following the cancellation of Intrusos.

=== 2020-present: 30 years, the Gutiérrez era and a new crisis ===
On May 28, 2020, Larraín Melo resigned as executive director of La Red. Through a press release, Albavisión announced that his position would be filled on an interim basis by journalist Víctor Gutiérrez Prieto. Shortly after taking over, Gutiérrez changed the station's editorial line, positioning La Red in a few months as an independent channel with a progressive editorial line, and an alternative to the news and entertainment offerings of the national media landscape.

During Gutiérrez's administration, the journalistic spaces "Pauta libre" were launched, with the participation of the National Journalism Prize Mónica González, the journalists Mirna Schindler, Yasna Lewin and Paula Molina, and the journalist José Antonio Neme, in addition to the news bulletins "La REDacción"; the content of "Mentiras Verdaderas" was reinforced with the participation as panelists of the journalists Mirko Macari, Mauricio Weibel and the sociologist Alberto Mayol; "Las Gansas" and "Chilezuela", programs geared towards the LGBTQIA+ and Venezuelan communities, respectively, debut, along with the comedy show "Políticamente Incorrecto", featuring Belén Mora and Rodrigo "Toto" Acuña. Additionally, October sees the return of the hit show "Cóctel", hosted by Natalia Mandiola, Nacho Pop, and Marcelo Maroccino.

According to a profile published by the "Diario Financiero" in 2021, Gutiérrez's time at La Red would be temporary, as his focus would be on making the channel more attractive to viewers and commercial sales to levels that would allow it to become self-sustaining beyond the annual capital injections that Albavisión makes to keep the channel on the air; all this within a period of two years, after which the journalist would hand over the executive management to another local executive.

In January 2022, the Network reported losses to the Financial Market Commission (CMF) for fiscal year 2021 of 10,009 million Chilean pesos (ARS), which nearly quintupled compared to fiscal year 2020, when they reached 2,219 million Chilean pesos (ARS) in the same period. Before the Internal Revenue Service (SII), the accumulated losses at the close of fiscal year 2021 are quantified at 70,158 million Chilean pesos (ARS), adding to those generated during that year another 60,750 million Chilean pesos (ARS) carried over from previous years. In mid-April, the station announced a programming change that will result in the broadcast of 93 hours of infomercials per week, far exceeding what was already shown by TV+ and Telecanal, and which will involve the removal of La Rosa de Guadalupe from the screen after 12 years of broadcasting in the 8 p.m. time slot.

On Monday, June 6, following a union meeting at the station held the previous Friday, the channel's workers voted to carry out an indefinite work stoppage due to the non-payment of salaries and pension contributions, which in some cases have been owed since February. Live broadcasts of "Hola Chile" and "Mentiras Verdaderas" were replaced by episodes of "Sesame Street", "Como dice el dicho", and pre-recorded cultural programming. In the afternoon, rumors reported by Radio ADN indicated that Gutiérrez was about to resign as executive director of La Red, a decision that was confirmed later that day.

A few days later, the digital media outlet "Interferencia" revealed that Gutiérrez had attempted to secure a new capital injection from Albavisión to address the station's difficult financial situation by traveling to the United States. This attempt was unsuccessful. The article also noted the presence of an accounting auditor appointed by Remigio Ángel González, who had been stationed at La Red's studios since mid-May. Furthermore, the article indicated that outstanding salaries and other obligations to staff would be settled during the second week of June. According to sources within the station, an unspecified percentage of the losses was attributed to previous administrations, and the article confirmed that Gutiérrez would remain connected to La Red's controlling shareholder from Mexico, where he would advise on the search for and selection of his successor.

On September 22, after a meeting between CEO Marcelo Pandolfo, the president of ANATEL, and the director of the Teletón Foundation, the broadcast of the 2022 version of the Teletón on La Red was officially announced, thus overcoming the conflict generated by questions about the transparency of the foundation during the Gutiérrez administration.

In mid-December 2022, the channel's staff voted to strike again due to unpaid wages from the previous month, definitively ending "Hola Chile" and giving way to a schedule made up of 100% packaged programming and infomercials. In February 2023, Eduardo de la Iglesia resigned from La Red after 9 years as its face, while during May Julia Vial, Álvaro "Nacho Pop" Reyes, Juan Andrés Salfate and Michel Roldán also left the station; By mid-year, only three externally produced programs occupy the channel's programming: "El Disidente" — a talk show hosted by Oscar Céspedes, a journalist linked to the far right; "Fundación Nueva Mente" by Teresa Marinovic.-,"La Picá de mi Compadre" — a cultural space presented by the actor Adriano Castillo — and "La Caja de Pandora", an entertainment space that will replace "Mentiras Verdaderas" in prime time from July 5, and which according to its producers will be hosted by "an artificial intelligence" called "Pandora".

On May 28, 2026, the National Television Council ordered La Red to suspend its operations for ten days.

== Programming ==
Among the many TV shows broadcast on La Red are these:

| Year | Time | Title | Notes |
|---|---|---|---|
| 1999 | | Cara a Cara | Interviews by Tomás Cox. |
| 2005 | | Así somos | Evening program hosted by Cristián Pérez. |
| 2005 | | Cada día mejor | Space for conversation and memories hosted by Alfredo Lamadrid. |
| 2006 | | Intrusos | Showbusiness news hosted by Jennifer Warner. |
| 2010 | | Mujeres Primero | Morning program hosted by Janine Leal and Antonella Ríos. |
| 2011 | | Expediente S | Entertainment program hosted by Juan Andrés Salfate. |
| 2011 | | Mentiras Verdaderas | Late night interview show hosted by Ignacio Franzani. |
| 2014 | | Cultura Verdadera | Late night culture show hosted by Ignacio Franzani. |
| 2014 | | Portavoz Noticias | Regional News hosted by Scarleth Cárdenas. |
| 2015 | | Entrevista Verdadera | Interviews by Beatriz Sánchez. |
| 2016 | | Hola Chile | Morning show hosted by Julia Vial and Eduardo de la Iglesia. |

See also es:Anexo:Producciones de La Red#Programas actuales y de continuidad

== Network ==
The channel was owned by several companies, such as TV Azteca and Copesa, before being sold to Mexican businessman Remigio Ángel González. The channel was called Red Television (Network Television) for about ten years until 2009, before being reverted to its original name in 2009. It mainly airs Hollywood blockbusters (especially in primetime). It is also the TV station that broadcast the local version of the popular "Big Brother" and WWE shows like WWE Raw and WWE SmackDown.

In audience share, it currently ranks fifth behind TVN, Canal 13, CHV, and Mega.
