= Gabino Palomares =

Mexican singer-songwriter (1950–2026)

- Gabino Palomares in 2024

Background information
- Born: 26 May 1950; Comonfort, Guanajuato, Mexico
- Died: 30 September 2026 (aged 76)
- Genres: Nueva canción, canto nuevo, protest song
- Instruments: Voice, guitar

Gabino Palomares Gómez (Note: In this Mexican name, the surname is Palomares and the second or maternal family name is Gómez.) (26 May 1950 – 30 September 2026) was a Mexican singer-songwriter and a social and political activist. He was one of the main exponents of the nueva canción movement in Latin America, and one of the founders of the canto nuevo movement in Mexico, alongside Amparo Ochoa, Óscar Chávez, and the group Los Folkloristas. He was the author of "La maldición de Malinche" (transl. "Malinche's Curse", 1978), one of the most prominent songs of the movement, and of more than a hundred songs covering social, political, and love themes.

== Life and career ==
Gabino Palomares Gómez was born in Comonfort, Guanajuato on 26 May 1950. He studied chemistry at the Autonomous University of San Luis Potosí. His first show, Poems and Songs, premiered at the university's Song Festival of 1972 with great success. In 1975, he moved to Mexico City where he started singing in bars, peñas, universities, underprivileged neighborhoods, public squares, union headquarters, and small theaters. Two venues were noteworthy: "El mesón de la guitarra" and "La peña Tecuicanime." Here, he met Amparo Ochoa and Salvador "Chava" Flores, with whom he began a life-long friendship. Amparo Ochoa performed and recorded several of his songs, among them "La Maldición de Malinche" (Malinche's Curse, 1978) and "¿Quién tiene la voz?" (Who owns the voice?, 1984). In the same way, throughout his career Gabino Palomares performed and recorded many of Chava Flores's songs. Some of them are part of the album Gabino Palomares interpreta a Chava Flores (Gabino Palomares Sings the Songs of Chava Flores, 2010).

At the end of the 1970s, Gabino Palomares started to be recognized as one of the main exponents of both Mexican canto nuevo and the Latin American nueva canción (new song). In 1978, he recorded his first album La Maldición de Malinche (Malinche's Curse) that includes some of his most emblematic songs, among them: "A la patria" (To the Homeland, 1978), "La Maldición de Malinche" (Malinche's Curse, 1978), "La letanía de los poderosos" (The Powerful's Litany, 1978). According to musicologist Jan Fairley, "La maldición de Malinche" is "surely one of the most important songs of the Americas". Also in 1978, Gabino Palomares contributed as composer, singer, and actor in Felipe Santander's celebrated piece "El extensionista" (The extensionist, 1978). From this experience appeared, in 1985, his album El extensionista (The Extensionist, 1985). In 1980, Gabino Palomares recorded his second studio album Fabricando la luz (Manufacturing the Light, 1980).

In recognition of both his work as singer-songwriter and social activist, Gabino Palomares was elected in 1982, in Cuba, General Secretary of the International Committee of the New Song, a position he held until 1988.

From 1980 on, Gabino Palomares's career throve as he performed in several tours and festivals in Argentina, Cuba, El Salvador, Germany, the U.S., Canada, Ecuador, Venezuela, Uruguay, Nicaragua, Guatemala, the Dominican Republic, Peru and Costa Rica. In Mexico, he performed at important venues such as the Palacio de Bellas Artes, the Auditorio Nacional, the Teatro de la Ciudad and the Palacio de los Deportes, and toured the country extensively. Between 1984 and 1989, he recorded the albums: Hace como un año (About a Year Ago, 1984), No te creo nada (I don't Believe You at All, 1987) y ¿Qué vamos a hacer? (What Are We Going to Do?, 1989). In 1991, he launched Canciones contra la Guerra (Songs Against the War, 1991) in response to the U.S. invasion of Iraq.

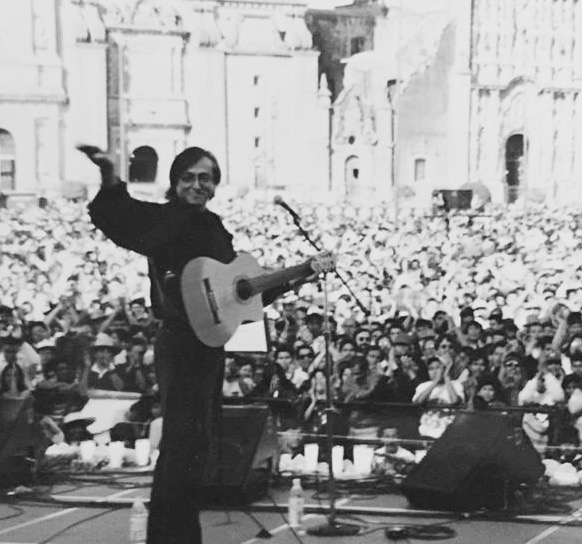
Palomares performing at a concert in Mexico City's Zócalo.

After almost a decade without releasing a record — which didn't stop him from performing and continuing his social activism — he launched in the year 2000 the album Historia cotidiana (An Everyday Story, 2000). The record includes a song dedicated to the EZLN: "Espejos de mi alma" (Mirrors of my soul, 2000) and a personal homage to singer and friend Amparo Ochoa: "Hermosísimo lucero" ("Beautiful Bright Star").

Throughout his career, Gabino Palomares shared stages with some of the great exponents of the Latin American nueva canción movement, among them: Mercedes Sosa, Silvio Rodríguez, Pete Seeger, Daniel Viglietti, León Gieco, Pablo Milanés, Alí Primera, Luis Eduardo Aute, Joan Manuel Serrat, Luis Enrique Mejía Godoy, Isabel Parra, Pedro Luís Ferrer and Chico Buarque.

On 3 August 2012, Gabino Palomares celebrated his 40-year career with a concert/homage organized by Mexico City's Government at the Teatro de la Ciudad.

On 30 September 2013, he performed at Mexico City's prestigious Auditorio Nacional in the concert 40 años, Los mismos sueños (40 Years, The Same Dreams) alongside the groups Quilapayún, Inti-Illimani, Los Folkloristas, Santiago del Nuevo Extremo, and Uruguayan singer-songwriter Daniel Viglietti.

Palomares died on 30 September 2026, at the age of 76.

== Discography ==
- La maldición de Malinche, Discos Pueblo, Mexico, 1978, LP.
- Fabricando la luz, Discos Pueblo, Mexico, 1980, LP.
- Hace como un año, Discos Pueblo, Mexico, 1984, LP.
- El extensionista, Discos Plan Joven del CREA, Mexico, 1985, LP.
- No te creo nada, BMG Ariola, Mexico, 1987, LP.
- ¿Qué vamos a hacer?, BMG Ariola, Mexico, 1989, LP.
- Septiembre: Canciones contra la guerra, Ediciones Pentagrama, Mexico, 1991, LP.
- Antología 1, Discos Pueblo, Mexico, 1997, LP.
- Antología 2, Ediciones Pentagrama, Mexico, 1997, LP.
- Historia cotidiana, Ediciones Pentagrama, Mexico, 2000, LP.
- Salimos, Ediciones Pentagrama, Mexico, 2006, LP.
- México a través de su canto, Ediciones Pentagrama, Mexico, 2010, LP.
- Gabino Palomares interpreta a Chava Flores, Ediciones Pentagrama, Mexico, 2010, LP.
