= Tehua =

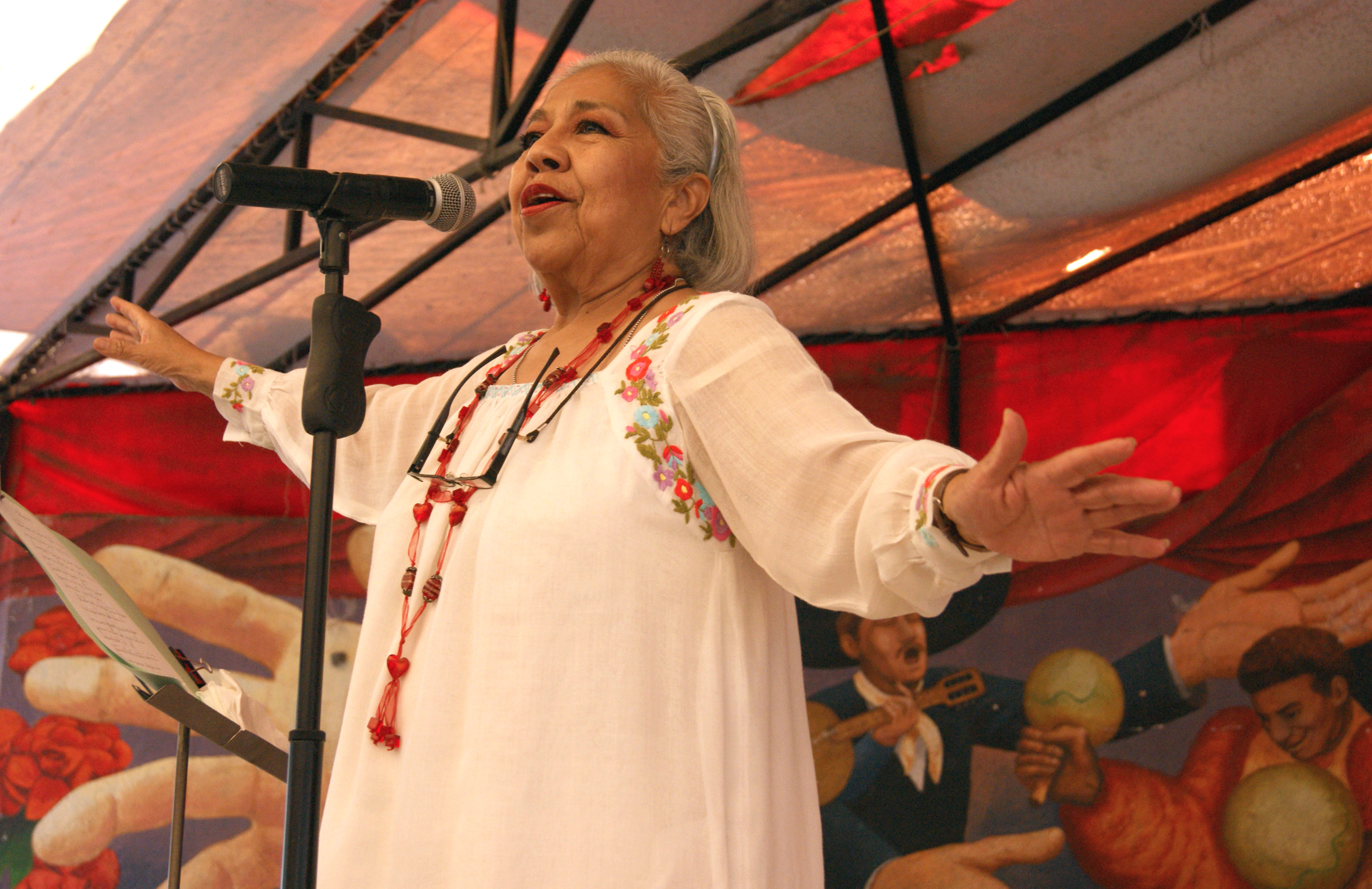
- Performing in Nápoles Park on 4 May 2014
- Born: María del Rosario Graciela Rayas Trejo; 1943; Querétaro City, Mexico
- Died: 21 August 2014 (aged 71); Mexico City, Mexico
- Occupation: Singer

María del Rosario Graciela Rayas Trejo (1943 – 21 August 2014), known professionally as Tehua ("you" in Nahuatl), was a Mexican singer and popularizer of traditional music. She was named by the poet Jaime Sabines as the "abusive voice of birds."

== Biography ==
When she was two years old, Tehua's family emigrated from Querétaro City to San Miguel de Allende, Guanajuato, of which she considers herself a native. At age 26 she moved to Mexico City to begin her career as a singer. According to her own admissions, her intention was to have a style similar to that of Lucha Villa. However, the difference in their voices made it impossible to continue in that direction. She began to sing in bars.

In the early 1970s she began to sing protest songs. In that environment she met Óscar Chávez and Amparo Ochoa, with whom she collaborated on multiple occasions. During this decade she participated, within its musical segment, on the educational program Caminito, led by Pepita Gómiz, as well as the program Sábados con Saldaña, directed by Jorge Saldaña, where she worked with musicians and singers such as Jorge Macías, Óscar Chávez, and Daniel García Blanco.

Among Tehua's repertoire were old Mexican songs from different parts of the country, from Sonora to Oaxaca and Chiapas. She has interpreted songs by composers such as Joaquín Pardavé, Agustín Lara, Ignacio Fernández Esperón (Tata Nacho), and Salvador Chava Flores. She has rescued songs such as "Mis blancas mariposas", "La norteña", "El buque de más potencia", "Cuatro milpas", "Mi casita de paja", and "El jarabe loco", which were in danger of being forgotten.

Her career was not very commercial. In addition to her records, her songs appear on cultural radio stations. She gave special attention to live performances, in association with cultural institutions of Mexico City and some states of the republic.

Tehua died from cancer in Mexico City on 21 August 2014.

== Select discography ==
- Añoranzas mexicanas
- Añoranzas mexicanas volumen II
- Añoranzas mexicanas volumen III
- Añoranzas mexicanas volumen IV
- Añoranzas mexicanas volumen V, with Óscar Chávez
- Añoranzas mexicanas volumen VI, with Óscar Chávez
- Añoranzas mexicanas volumen VII, interpreting Tata Nacho
- Y la canción se hizo... Historia
- La canción femenina, singing María Grever
- Tehua interpreta a Chava Flores
