= MediaBanda =

Chilean musical band

- Origin: Santiago, Chile
- Genres: rock in opposition; jazz-rock; alternative rock; jazz-funk; funk rock; baroque pop; hard rock; pop rock; rapcore; latin american fusion; art-rock; avant-garde; free improvisation; experimental music; contemporary classical music
- Years active: 2003–2010, 2013–present
- Website: www.mediabanda.cl

MediaBanda is a Chilean musical group that is characterized by its eclectic and energetic proposal, nourished by several styles such as rock, jazz, funk, pop, Latin American Fusion and contemporary music, among others. It was formed in the year 2000 in Santiago de Chile by saxophonist and composer Cristián Crisosto. The ensemble's line-up is an expanded rock band that has varied in time but usually has a woodwind section as protagonists in addition to lead voices and a refined rhythm section.

== Name ==
The name of the band, MediaBanda, means literally "half band" in spanish language, hinting to be half of a big band, however in Chilean Spanish, the term media is used as big, huge, as well as awesome and impressive. Therefore, the meaning of MediaBanda might be "Awesome Band".

== History ==
=== Formation (2000–2002) ===
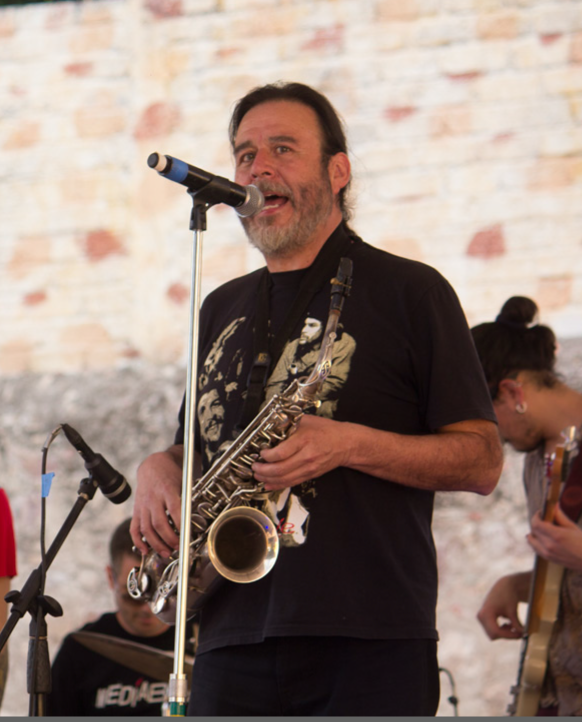
Cristián Crisosto creator and main composer of the group

A first band named MediaBanda and formed by Pato Zúñiga, Cristián Crisosto, Jaime Vivanco, Willy Valenzuela, Raúl González, Sergio Pinto, and Miguel Schain, began to operate at the beginning of the 1980s as a group that explored the fusion of rock, funk, jazz, and free improvisation, also inspired in Rock in Opposition movement. From this formation there was only one unpublished demo. However, when Crisosto and Vivanco joined the rest of the final members, decided to make new music and change the name to "Fulano", starting a great career from 1984 to 2015, leaving an indelible mark in the history of Chilean music. It is later to the album Trabajos Inútiles (Useless Works, 1997) by Fulano that Cristián Crisosto began an ambitious personal composition project, which in the year 2000 is concretized by putting together a new band, with his wife Arlette Jequier (voice), their daughter Regina Crisosto (voice), and seven other young musicians; Santiago Astaburuaga, (bass), Christian Hirth (drums), Daniel Linker (piano), Diego Aguirre (guitar), Sebastián Dintrans (guitar), Patricio Bracamonte (trombone), Marcelo Maira (flute and sax), taking up the previous name of MediaBanda. This is how the current Mediabanda was born.

=== First period (2003–2010) ===
After a long period of rehearsals and workshop work to put together the complex compositions of Crisosto, Mediabanda launched in June 2004 its first album entitled Entre la inseguridad y el ego (Between Insecurity and Ego), financed thanks to the support of Fondart with a concert in the theater of the Centro Arte Alameda. The album stands out for its great musical eclecticism, compositional complexity and richness of sound, in songs that walk with ease through rock, funk, salsa, afro-latin rhythms, pop melodies, jazz arrangements, avant-garde music and even at times, classical music. At the end of 2004, the faculty of the Escuela Moderna de Música awarded MediaBanda the prize for best band of the year, and Wikén magazine of the newspaper El Mercurio qualifies the group as the best new Chilean artist. As a result of the reception of the critics and the public, they are invited to participate in the 4th Providencia Jazz International Festival, sharing the stage with international artists such as Paquito D'Rivera, Yellowjackets, Lito Vitale and others. Later they would also act in Centro Cultural Matucana 100 next to Akineton Retard, between other presentations of the period. In April 2005 he won his second Fondart project, which included a national tour that took place during the months of October and November.

In April 2006, they won for the third time a Fondart project to finance their second record production Dinero y Terminación Nerviosa (Money and nerve endings) which was recorded in January 2007 and launched in June of the same year in two concerts at the Centro Arte Alameda. The album was a double CD where their style of fusion rock, jazz, and contemporary music develops, consolidating the group as one of the most important of the Latin American progressive fusion style. This time the composition was also open to Hirth and Dintrans, in addition to notable experimental improvisations from Jequier, Hirth and Astaburuaga. A week later, they embark on a trip to Europe for a month and a half, performing in various halls, auditoriums and festivals such as the Nuits du Sud Festival in Vence France, and others in Spain, Germany, the Netherlands, Czech Republic, Austria and Italy. Upon returning to Chile, they would perform at the Teatro Oriente next to Congreso and Akineton Retard. Later also with the experimental percussion group Code, in the same theater.

In 2010 they released a new album called Siendo Perro (Being dog), with a new line-up which highlights the harmonic use of guitars as a replacement for the piano, and the incorporation of funk, and hard rock to the already avant-garde jazz-rock fusion. Siendo Perro was released without the voice of Arlette Jequier, what glimpsed the beginning of the breaks within the band and that led to a silence of more than two years.

=== Second period (2013 – present) ===
In mid-2013, a new line up for the second age of MediaBanda was gathered, including six new members. In 2014 they participate in the celebration of the 30 years of the Fulano group, held at the Nescafé Theater of Arts together with Santiago del Nuevo Extremo, Pedro Foncea (from De Kiruza), and Angelo Pierattini (from Weichafe). During this period the group made a series of performances re-opening a large part of the repertoire, which also had the collaboration of Consuelo Schuster and Celeste Shaw in voices and that coincided with an important rotation of musicians in the base formation.

During 2016 they composed and recorded their highly anticipated new album, Bombas en el Aire (Bombs in the Air), which premiered in January 2017 in a crowded Sala SCD in Plaza Egaña. The following week they are presented with great success at the Woodstaco Festival 2017 in Maule Region, before thousands of people, then continuing the album presentations in Valparaíso Region. It was recorded in CHT Estudios as a musical workshop experiment instead of the usage of scores that had been the fundamental support in the early days. During the months of July and August they went on tour to Mexico which included presentations in the Jalisco Jazz Festival in Guadalajara, the FestivAlterNativo in Querétaro, in addition to the cultural circuit of Mexico City. Back in Chile, they performed a series of presentations with other avant-garde bands such as Crisis (by Nicolás Vera and Cristián Gallardo), Sube, Zet, Cola de Zorro, Aisles, Fósil and Ojo de Pez among others. In January 2018, they participated in the celebration of the 10th anniversary of the Woodstaco Festival in Teno.

Since late 2018 they are presenting the show "Mediabanda Plays Fulano", premiered on November 16, 2018, at the Teatro Oriente with guests such as Pablo Ilabaca (from Chancho en Piedra), Nicolás Vera, Consuelo Schuster, and Como asesinar a Felipes, paying tribute to the music of the mythical Chilean fusion band Fulano, and in particular to the great maestro Jaime Vivanco, performed with new arrangements by Tomás Ravassa on keyboards, and Aurelio Silva on guitar, in a staging that wastes energy and attitude. Given their success, they have continued to perform at venues such as the Valparaíso and Quilpué Jazz Festivals, Teatro San Joaquín, and La Batuta in Ñuñoa. In January 2020 they release the first single from their upcoming new album entitled Maquinarias (Machinery) in tribute to Fulano, with the classic anti-authoritarian satire Adolfo, Benito, Augusto y Toribio, at the Museum of Memory and Human Rights and in the context of the Social Outbreak. After production delays due to the COVID-19 pandemic, the album Maquinarias was finally released on July 1, 2021, on streaming and CD. The album is dedicated to composer Jaime Vivanco who tragedly died in 2003, and contains ten new arrangements of his compositions in Fulano, which had the collaboration of the Ilabaca brothers (from Chancho en Piedra), the actor and folklorist Daniel Muñoz, and singer Consuelo Schuster, among others.

== Musical style ==
Cristian Crisosto's main influences have been American composer Frank Zappa and the European Rock in opposition movement. Weather Report, Return to Forever, Magma, King Crimson, Hermeto Pascoal, Miles Davis and Thelonious Monk have also been important influences. Many other acts of different origins and styles have been significant too such as Nirvana, Led Zeppelin, David Bowie, Charly García, and most notably Crisosto's former band Fulano. In addition to all these influences, there are those that each talented member of the band has had and that have served as essential contributions to the sound of the ensemble.

MediaBanda has been called by the prestigious musicologist Juan Pablo González as "anti-hegemonic eclecticism", since many influences are noticeable but none of them predominates over the other ones. Roughly point out as jazz-rock, MediaBanda has explored many elements of different subgenres and music styles in its five studio albums experience such as chamber rock, progressive rock, baroque pop, pop rock, soul rock, funk rock, hard rock, art rock, alternative rock, latin rock, punk jazz, post punk, fusion jazz, jazz funk, latin jazz, rapcore, latin American fusion, experimental music, classical music, contemporary music, avant-garde music, atonal music, and free improvisation.

== Discography ==
- 2004 – Entre la Inseguridad y el Ego (Between Insecurity and Ego)
- 2007 – Dinero y Terminación Nerviosa (Money and Nerve Endings)
- 2010 – Siendo Perro (Being Dog)
- 2017 – Bombas en el Aire (Bombs in the Air)
- 2021 – Maquinarias (Machinery)

== Members ==
=== Current ===
- Cristián Crisosto, composition, flute, saxs, voice (2000- )
- Christian Hirth, drums (2000 - )
- Rodrigo Aguirre, saxs and flute (2009 - )
- Rafael Chaparro, saxs (2013 - )
- Tomás Ravassa, piano and keyboards (2013 - )
- Aurelio Silva, guitar (2013 - )
- Felipe Martínez, bass (2015 - )
- Florencia Novoa, voice (2019 - )

=== Former ===
- Patricio Bracamonte, trombone (2000–2005)
- Daniel Linker, piano and keyboards (2000–2006)
- Santiago Astaburuaga, bass (2000–2008)
- Arlette Jequier, voice and clarinet (2000–2009)
- Marcelo Maira, flute and saxs (2000–2009)
- Diego Aguirre, guitar (2000–2010)
- Regina Crisosto, voice and synths (2000–2010)
- Sebastián Dintrans, guitar (2000–2010)
- Cristóbal Dahm, clarinet, saxs (2005–2017)
- Jaime Ramos, piano keyboards (2006–2009)
- Javier Barahona, bass (2008–2010, 2014)
- Francisco Loyola, piano (2009)
- Nicolás Voigth, bass (2013)
- Carolina Riveros, voice (2013)
- Benjamín Lechuga, guitar (2013–2014)
- Matías Baeza, guitar (2015–2016)
- Valentina Mardones, voice (2014–2018)
