= Santiago del Nuevo Extremo =

Santiago del Nuevo Extremo may mean:

- Santiago del Nuevo Extremo, the original name given to the city of Santiago, Chile
- Santiago del Nuevo Extremo (band), a Chilean band founded in 1978
