= Chava Flores =

Mexican composer

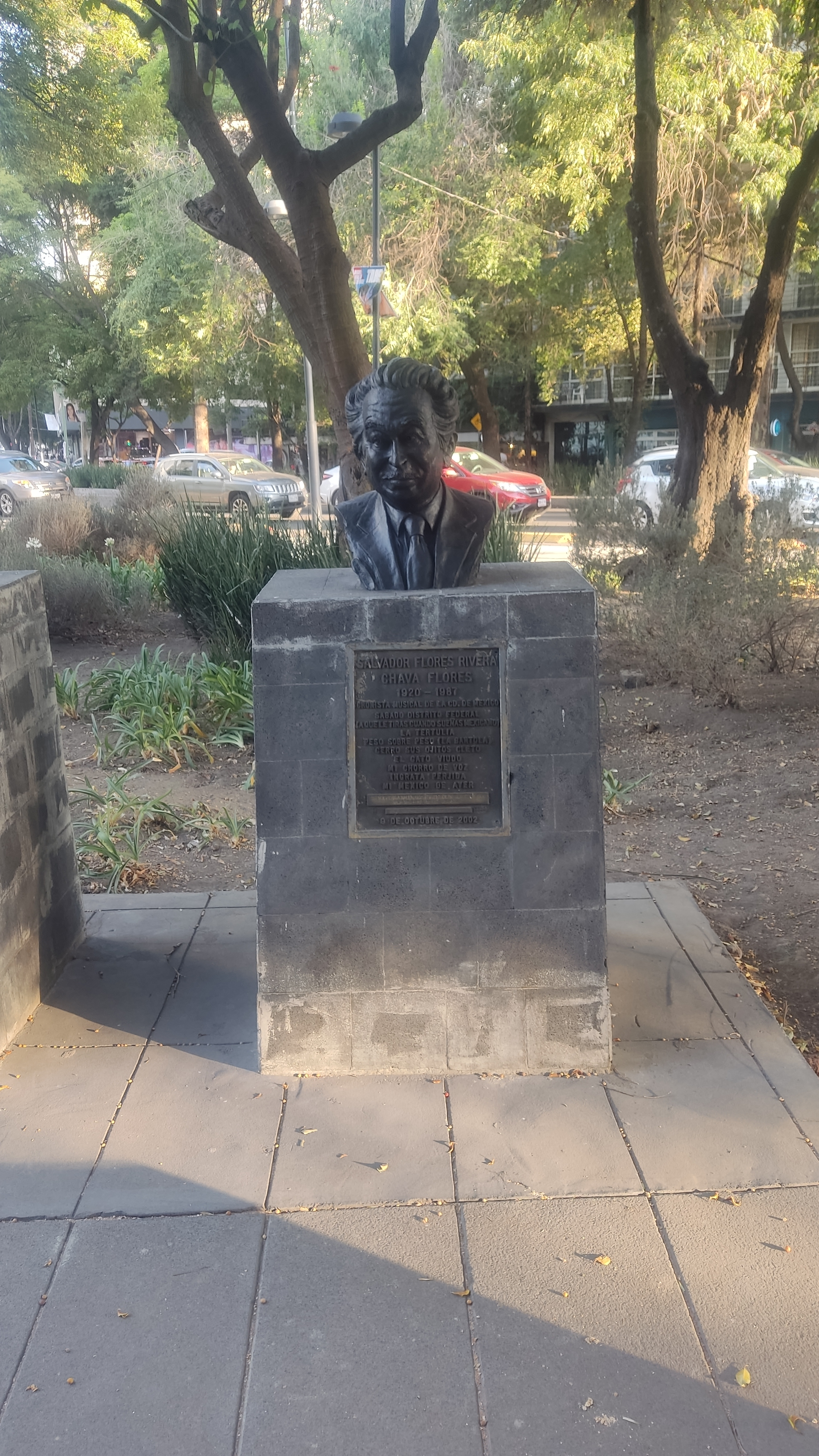

Background information
- Born: Salvador Flores Rivera; 14 January 1920; Mexico City, Mexico
- Died: 5 August 1987 (aged 67) Mexico City, Mexico
- Occupations: composer and singer

Salvador Flores Rivera (Note: In this Hispanic American name, the first or paternal surname is Flores and the second or maternal family name is Rivera.) (14 January 1920 – 5 August 1987), known as Chava Flores, was a Mexican composer and singer of popular and folkloric music. His songs often described the lives of Mexico City's ordinary people.

== Biography ==
Flores was born in the old La Merced neighborhood, in Mexico City's historical center, on calle de La Soledad. It is presumed he grew up in Tacuba, in Colonia Roma and in Santa Maria la Ribera, although he is also located in Azcapotzalco and Unidad Cuitláhuac, where he lived until 1933, when he moved to Morelia, Michoacán. His father died in 1933, so he had to start working to contribute to the support of his family.

== El Álbum de Oro de la Canción ==
Chava Flores had many jobs since his childhood; he worked as a tailor, warehouse manager, collector, door-to-door salesman, a hardware store administrator, owner of a shirt and sausage store and a printer, among other things. All of those occupations involved moving throughout the city, which was very useful when he became a composer because, he traveled to neighborhoods, streets and colonies, and witnessed various situations that would later translate into his songs. Thanks to that he was awarded the title of Cronista Cantor de la Ciudad de México (Mexico City's singing chronicler).

In 1946, he had to close his shirt store. With his colleagues in the hardware store, Flores began his work in a printing press; In the beginning, things worked in a regular way but, the press began to improve in 1949 when it published the magazine El Álbum de Oro de la Canción (The Golden Album of Songs).

== First songs ==
Flores debuted with the song "Dos Horas de Balazos". To this song he added "La tertulia", both were recorded by RCA Victor in 1952. He acted in the tents and cabarets of the city, and gained fame in the rest of the country, in Latin America and in the United States. By 1976, he had already recorded seven full-length albums, and owned the label Ageleste.

== Moving to Morelia and death ==
In 1983, he moved to the city of Morelia, Michoacán, where he had a television program. He died on 5 August 1987 and was buried in Mexico City's Panteón Jardín.

== Tribute ==
On 14 January 2017, Google celebrated his 97th birthday with a Google Doodle.

== Some of his songs ==
Flores's songs featured a popular language, with double entendres and wordplays. Some of his compositions are:

- ¿A qué le tiras cuando sueñas, mexicano?
- Adiós Trinidad
- Ahí viene el tren
- Amor de lejos
- Apolonia la bonita
- Ayer me contaron
- Boda de la vecindad
- Cachito de retrato
- Calendario de amor
- Cerró sus ojitos Cleto
- Cuando me busquen tus ojos
- Cuando te digan
- Cuento de hadas
- Dos horas de balazos
- El aguacate de hueso café
- El apartamento
- El baile de Tejeringo
- El bautizo de Cheto
- El chico temido de la vecindad
- El crimen el expresso
- El cumpleaños de Escolapia
- El gato viudo
- El jijo del granadero
- El retrato de Manuela
- El tololoche (see tololoche)
- En México
- En tu estuche de recuerdos
- Ése soy yo
- Ha nacido un cuento
- Hoy sí se me hizo
- Herculano
- Hogar dulce hogar
- Ingrata pérjida
- La casa de Lupe
- La chilindrina
- La creminosa
- La esquina de mi barrio
- La Ignacia
- La interesada
- La jardinera de la paletería
- La presentación
- La puerca
- La taquiza
- La tertulia
- La tienda de mi pueblo
- Lágrimas de Josefina
- Las otras mañanitas
- Llegaron los gorrones
- Los aguaceros de mayo
- Los frijoles de Anastasia
- Los pulques de Apan
- Los quince años de Espergencia
- Manito
- Martita la piadosa
- Mi amigo Nacho
- Mi chorro de voz
- Mi linda Hortensia
- Mi México de ayer
- Muñeco tonto
- Murió de amor la desdichada Elvira
- No es justu
- Oiga asté
- Peso sobre peso
- Pichicuas
- Pobre jilguero
- Pobre Tom
- Pomposita
- Que modotes
- Sábado, Distrito Federal
- Tornando té
- Tú lo serás
- Vámonos al parque, Céfira
- Vieja carta
- Vino la Reforma
- Voy en el metro
- Yo soy la criada

== Interpreters of his songs ==
- Agustín Isunza
- Amparo Ochoa
- Ángel Cervantes
- Arturo de la Mora
- Ernesto Anaya
- Fernando Rosas
- Germán Valdés "Tin Tan"
- Guadalupe Pineda
- Irma Infante Aguirre
- José Alfredo Jiménez
- Las kukaras
- Leo Marini y La Sonora Matancera
- Libertad Lamarque
- Los bribones
- Los cometas
- Los hermanos Reyes
- Luis Aguilar
- Manuel "El Loco" Valdés
- Miguel Aceves Mejía
- Óscar Chávez
- Pedro Infante
- Pedro Vargas
- Rosita Quintana
- Rubén Schwartzman
- Sonia Infante
- Tehua
- Trío Los mexicanos
- Víctor Iturbe "El Pirulí"

== Filmography ==
=== Actor ===
- La esquina de mi barrio, 1957, dir. Fernando Méndez (credited as Salvador Flores)
- Mi influyente mujer, 1957, dir. Rogelio A. González
- Bajo el cielo de México, 1958, dir. Rafael Baledón
- El correo del norte, 1960, dir. Zacarías Gómez Urquiza
- Rebelde sin casa, 1960, dir. Benito Alazraki
- La máscara de la muerte, 1961, dir. Zacarías Gómez Urquiza
- 4 hembras y un macho menos, 1979, dir. Del Tal Gomezbeck
- ¿A qué le tiras cuando sueñas... mexicano?, 1979, dir. Arturo Martínez

=== Composer ===
- Mujer, así es la vida, 1980, dir. Armando Lazo (Original score by him and Amparo Ochoa)
- 4 hembras y un macho menos, 1979, dir. Del Tal Gomezbeck (sSábado, Distrito Federal" y "El retrato de Manuela")
