= Mexico in the OTI Festival 1978 =

- OTI Festival 1978
- Participating broadcaster: Televisa
- Country: Mexico
- Selection process: National OTI Festival
- Selection date: 22 October 1978

Competing entry
- Song: "Como tú"
- Artist: Lupita D'Alessio
- Songwriter: Lolita de la Colina

Placement
- Final result: 3rd, 44 points

Participation chronology
◄1977 •	1978	• 1979►

Mexico was represented at the OTI Festival 1978 with the song "Como tú", written by Lolita de la Colina, and performed by Lupita D'Alessio. The Mexican participating broadcaster, Televisa, selected its entry through a national televised competition with several phases. The song, that was performed in position 13, placed third out of 19 competing entries, with 44 points.

== National stage ==
Televisa held a national competition with four televised qualifying rounds and a final to select its entry for the 7th edition of the OTI Festival. This seventh edition of the National OTI Festival featured thirty-nine songs, of which ten reached the final. In addition to the general competition, awards were given for Best Performer, and Best Musical Arrangement, among all the competing artists.

The shows were held at Teatro de la Ciudad in Mexico City, were presented by Raúl Velasco, and were broadcast on Canal 2. The musical director was Chucho Ferrrer, who conducted the Single Union of Music Workers of Mexico orchestra when required. Hermanos Zavala, the single mixed backing choir of five voices, were credited on the songs they accompanied.

Competing entries on the National OTI Festival – Mexico 1978
Song	Artist	Songwriter(s)	Conductor
"Alma niña"	Héctor Meneses	Héctor Meneses	
"Amar por amar"	Álvaro Dávila	Álvaro Dávila	Guillermo Méndez Guiú
"Amo a la vida"	Sergio Esquivel	Sergio Esquivel	Rodolfo Rey
"Amor y paz"	Martha Caramelo	Guillermo Rocha	
"Canción con sombrero"	Guadalupe Trigo and Viola	Guadalupe Trigo	Lázaro Muñiz
"Canto lo que siento"	Humberto Cravioto	Arnulfo M. Vega	
"Como olvidar"	Mario Pintor	María Esther Esparza	
"Como tú"	Lupita D'Alessio	Lolita de la Colina	Chucho Ferrer
"Cuando pienso en ti"	Lila Deneken	Nacho Méndez	Nacho Méndez
"De la tierra y el mar"	Los Joao	Fernando Riba	
"Detente"	María del Carmen	Ruben Fuentes; Rodolfo Brito	
"Dime por qué"	Yoshio	Ernesto Ábrego; Miguel Medina; Yoshio	Chucho Ferrer
"Él y yo"	Emmanuel	Emmanuel	Chucho Ferrer
"El poeta trovador"	Grupo Hermanos and friends	Lázaro Muñiz; Armando Martínez	
"Gracias"	Carlos Lico	José Sierra Flores	
"Jilguero"	Joan Sebastian	Joan Sebastian	
"Jugando besos"	José Luis Almada	Massías	
"La amistad"	Los Hermanos Carrión	Ramón Arencibia	
"La casa extrañará"	Imelda Miller	Imelda Miller	Raúl Vidaurri
"Magia blanca"	Tehua	Rafael Elizondo	
"Mamá y yo"	Massías	Massías	
"Nada más por ti"	Sola	Jonathán Zarzosa	
"No es por ti mi amor"	Brujos y Brujas	Sergio Luna	
"No soy como tú"	Sonia Rivas	Sonia Rivas	
"No tengo nada"	Fernando Riba	Gloria Mayo; Fernando Riba	
"Nuestro mundo"	Grupo Katarsis	Luis Amador de Gama; Omar Jasso; José Stephens	
"Para querer a un hombre"	José Roberto	José Roberto	
"Puede haber amor"	Felipe Gil	Felipe Gil	
"Querido amigo"	Luis Daniel and Sergio	Sergio Ortiz	
"Quinceañera"	Potro	Potro; G. Vaccari	
"Salvador de flores"	Fátima	Javier Salazar	
"Señora corazón"	Johnny Laboriel	Felipe Gil	Chucho Ferrer
"Simplemente el amor"	Manolo Solo	Miguel Prado; Carlos González	
"Soy"	Aria 8	Javier Salazar	
"Suéñate despierto"	Fernando Perdomo	Fernando Perdomo	
"Toca con tus manos el viento"	Los Randal	Raúl Aguilar; Edgar Aguilar	
"Todo pasa"	La Revolución de Emiliano Zapata	Javier Martín del Campo	
"Todo sigue igual"	Víctor Yturbe	Sergio Esquivel	Chucho Ferrer
"Yo te amo"	Manolo Muñoz	Manolo Muñoz; Mario Molina Montes	

=== Qualifying rounds ===
The four qualifying rounds were held on Saturdays 16, 23, and 30 September, and 7 October 1978. The ten highest-scoring entries among the thirty-nine competing advanced to the final.

Qualifier

Result of the qualifying rounds of the National OTI Festival – Mexico 1979
R/O	Song	Artist	Result
First qualifying round – 16 September 1978
1	"Todo pasa"	La Revolución de Emiliano Zapata	—N/a
2	"Para querer a un hombre"	José Roberto	—N/a
3	"Salvador de flores"	Fátima	—N/a
4	"Querido amigo"	Luis Daniel and Sergio	—N/a
5	"Señora corazón"	Johnny Laboriel	Qualified
6	"El poeta trovador"	Grupo Hermanos and friends	—N/a
7	"Suéñate despierto"	Fernando Perdomo	—N/a
8	"Canto lo que siento"	Humberto Cravioto	—N/a
9	"Amor y paz"	Martha Caramelo	—N/a
10	"Gracias"	Carlos Lico	—N/a
Second qualifying round – 23 September 1978
1	"No es por ti mi amor"	Brujos y Brujas	—N/a
2	"Simplemente el amor"	Manolo Solo	—N/a
3	"Cuando pienso en ti"	Lila Deneken	Qualified
4	"Toca con tus manos el viento"	Los Randal	—N/a
5	"Quinceañera"	Potro	—N/a
6	"Nuestro mundo"	Grupo Katarsis	—N/a
7	"Jugando besos"	José Luis Almada	—N/a
8	"Yo te amo"	Manolo Muñoz	—N/a
9	"Magia blanca"	Tehua	—N/a
10	"Él y yo"	Emmanuel	Qualified
Third qualifying round – 30 September 1978
1	"Soy"	Aria 8	—N/a
2	"Como olvidar"	Mario Pintor	—N/a
3	"No soy como tú"	Sonia Rivas	—N/a
4	"Mamá y yo"	Massías	—N/a
5	"Canción con sombrero"	Guadalupe Trigo and Viola	Qualified
6	"De la tierra y el mar"	Los Joao	—N/a
7	"Nada más por ti"	Sola	—N/a
8	"Jilguero"	Joan Sebastian	—N/a
9	"Todo sigue igual"	Víctor Yturbe	Qualified
Fourth qualifying round – 7 October 1978
1	"La amistad"	Los Hermanos Carrión	—N/a
2	"Puede haber amor"	Felipe Gil	—N/a
3	"No tengo nada"	Fernando Riba	—N/a
4	"Detente"	María del Carmen	—N/a
5	"Amo a la vida"	Sergio Esquivel	Qualified
6	"Dime por qué"	Yoshio	Qualified
7	"La casa extrañará"	Imelda Miller	Qualified
8	"Amar por amar"	Álvaro Dávila	Qualified
9	"Alma niña"	Héctor Meneses	—N/a
10	"Como tú"	Lupita D'Alessio	Qualified

=== Final ===
The final was held on Sunday 22 October 1978. Fifteen expert jurors present in the hall, and five remote provincial juries located in Monterrey, Nuevo Laredo, Mérida, Torreón, and Guadalajara, scored the entries.

The winner was "Como tú", written by Lupita D'Alessio and performed by Lolita de la Colina; with "Cuando pienso en ti", written by Nacho Méndez and performed by Lila Deneken, placing second; and "Él y yo", written and performed by Emmanuel, placing third.

Winner

Result of the final of the National OTI Festival – Mexico 1978
R/O	Song	Artist	Points	Result
1	"Canción con sombrero"	Guadalupe Trigo and Viola	133	9
2	"Como tú"	Lupita D'Alessio	187	1
3	"Dime por qué"	Yoshio	128	10
4	"Todo sigue igual"	Víctor Yturbe	134	8
5	"Señora corazón"	Johnny Laboriel	155	5
6	"Amo a la vida"	Sergio Esquivel	145	6
7	"La casa extrañará"	Imelda Miller	136	7
8	"Cuando pienso en ti"	Lila Deneken	172	2
9	"Amar por amar"	Álvaro Dávila	164	4
10	"Él y yo"	Emmanuel	166	3

=== Merit awards ===
Lila Deneken received the Best Performer Award; and Chucho Ferrer the Best Musical Arrangement Award for "Él y yo".

=== Official album ===
Las 10 finalistas del Festival OTI 78 is the official compilation album of the seventh edition of the Mexican National OTI Festival, released by Sistema Radiópolis in 1978. The vinyl LP features the studio version of the ten songs qualified for the national final.

== At the OTI Festival ==
On 2 December 1978, the OTI Festival was held at the Municipal Theatre in Santiago, Chile, hosted by Televisión Nacional de Chile (TVN), Corporación de Televisión de la Universidad Católica de Chile (UCTV), Corporación de Televisión de la Universidad de Chile (UTV), and Corporación de Televisión de la Universidad Católica de Valparaíso (UCVTV), and broadcast live throughout Ibero-America. Lupita D'Alessio performed "Como tú" in position 13, with Chucho Ferrer conducting the event's orchestra, and placed third out of 19 competing entries, with 44 points.

=== Voting ===
Each participating broadcaster assembled a jury who awarded 5–1 points to their five favourite songs in order of preference.

Points awarded to Mexico
Score	Country
5 points	Argentina; Colombia; Panama; United States
4 points	El Salvador; Honduras; Peru; Venezuela
3 points	Chile
2 points	Brazil; Dominican Republic
1 point	Costa Rica

Points awarded by Mexico
Score	Country
5 points	United States
4 points	Puerto Rico
3 points	Spain
2 points	Peru
1 point	Uruguay
