= Lolita de la Colina =

Latin American Singer and Songwriter

- Born: Dolores de la Colina Flores; 26 December 1948 (age 77); Tampico (Tamaulipas), Mexico
- Occupation: Singer-songwriter

Dolores de la Colina Flores (born 26 December 1948, Tampico, Tamaulipas, Mexico), better known as Lolita de la Colina, is a Mexican singer and songwriter. She has written songs for Manoella Torres, Lupita D'Alessio, Sophy, José José, José Luis Rodríguez "El Puma", Daniela Romo, Arianna, Stephanie Salas, Raphael, Moncho, Manolo Muñoz, Vikki Carr, Trigo Limpio, Ana Gabriel, Raquel Olmedo, María Dolores Pradera, Olga Guillott, Gloria Lasso, Bebo y Cigala, Emmanuel, Estela Núñez, María Jiménez, Pedro Fernández, David Lee Garza, Verónica Castro, Manuel Mijares, Lucero, Yuri, Kika Edgar, Roberto Blades, Pepe Aguilar, Chavela Vargas, La Lupe, Marco Antonio Muñiz, Ernesto D'alessio and many other singers in different music styles. In 1974, she was discovered while in Puerto Rico by Tico/Alegre's Joe Cain and signed to the label.

In 1978, she won the Mexican national selection for the OTI Festival as a composer with the song "Como tú", performed by Lupita D'Alessio, and which represented Mexico in the OTI Festival 1978 placing third. She has also received numerous awards throughout her successful career. It also highlights that she has received on television and the Heraldos of Mexico, as well as multiple awards from the ACRIM and Acca as its renowned author and composer. Lolita de la Colina has conquered a place of honor in the world of Spanish-speaking dedicated songwriters.

In 2014, she was inducted into the Latin Songwriters Hall of Fame.
