= OTI Festival 1978 =

7th OTI Song Festival

Date and venue
- Final: 2 December 1978
- Venue: Municipal Theatre; Santiago, Chile

Organization
- Organizer: Organización de Televisión Iberoamericana (OTI)
- Supervisor: Condorcet Da Silva Costa

Production
- Host broadcaster: Televisión Nacional de Chile (TVN); Corporación de Televisión de la Universidad Católica de Chile (UCTV); Corporación de Televisión de la Universidad de Chile (UTV); Corporación de Televisión de la Universidad Católica de Valparaíso (UCVTV)
- Director: Fernando Leighton
- Musical director: Juan Azúa
- Presenters: Raúl Matas; Raquel Argandoña

Participants
- Number of entries: 19
- Debuting countries: Paraguay
- Non-returning countries: Guatemala; Nicaragua; Portugal
- Participation map: Participating countries Countries that participated in the past but not in 1978

Vote
- Voting system: Each country awarded 5-1 points to their 5 favourite songs
- Winning song: Brazil "El amor... cosa tan rara"

The OTI Festival 1978 (Spanish: Séptimo Gran Premio de la Canción Iberoamericana, Portuguese: Sétimo Grande Prêmio da Canção Ibero-Americana) was the seventh edition of the OTI Festival, held on 2 December 1978 at the Municipal Theatre in Santiago, Chile, and presented by Raúl Matas and Raquel Argandoña. It was organised by the Organización de Televisión Iberoamericana (OTI) and host broadcasters Televisión Nacional de Chile (TVN), Corporación de Televisión de la Universidad Católica de Chile (UCTV), Corporación de Televisión de la Universidad de Chile (UTV), and Corporación de Televisión de la Universidad Católica de Valparaíso (UCVTV). This was the first edition of the festival in which the winning broadcaster of the previous edition didn't host the following year.

Broadcasters from nineteen countries participated in the festival. The winner was the song "El amor... cosa tan rara" written and performed by Denisse de Kalafe representing Brazil; with "Ha vuelto ya", written by Ernesto Alejandro, and performed by Susy Leman representing the United States, placing second; and "Como tú", written by Lolita de la Colina, and performed by Lupita D'Alessio representing Mexico, placing third. This year's edition saw several important changes to the festival's format.

== Location ==
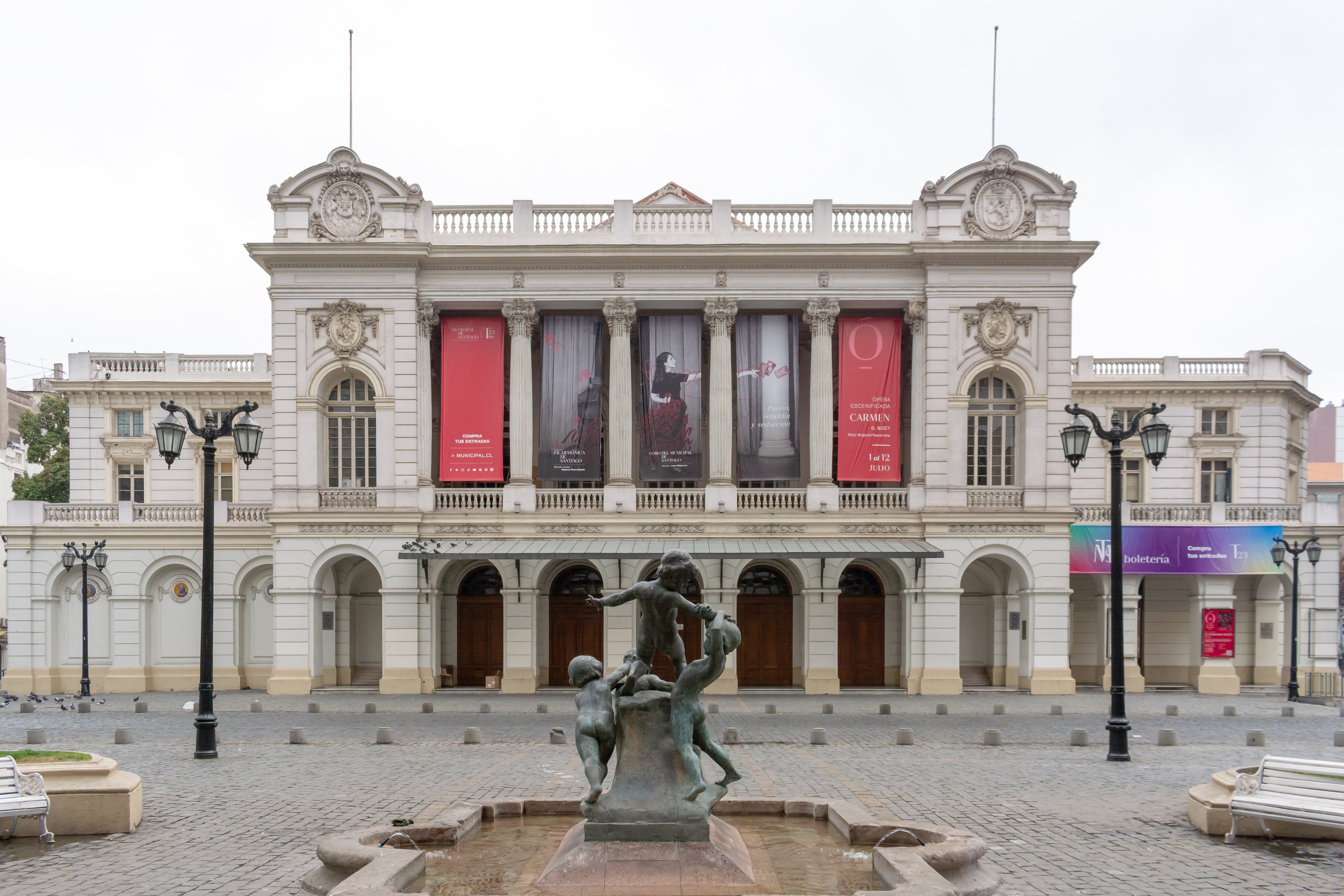
Municipal Theatre, Santiago – host venue of the OTI Festival 1978.

The Organización de Televisión Iberoamericana (OTI) opened a selection process to choose the host broadcaster for the seventh edition of the OTI Festival, to which all its member broadcasters were eligible to apply. (Note: As mentioned at the end of the 1977 festival.)

Televicentro de Nicaragua, which had won the 1977 festival for Nicaragua with the song "Quincho Barrilete" performed by Eduardo González, had the intention to host the contest at the Rubén Darío National Theatre in Managua, according to an internal committee of the company. However, the Nicaraguan Revolution was boosted by the Sandinistas in order to topple the dictatorship of Anastasio Somoza Debayle. The outcome of the revolution was a violent civil war which caused a human and economical catastrophe in the country, which prevented the broadcaster from submitting his candidacy. This was the first time that the winning broadcaster of the previous edition didn't host the following year.

In March 1978, the OTI accepted at its 7th General Assembly the proposal of the Chilean broadcasters, among the applications it had received, and designated them as the host broadcasters of the 1978 festival. Four Chilean national television networks joined forces in order to host the festival. Televisión Nacional de Chile (TVN) organized the event together with Corporación de Televisión de la Universidad Católica de Chile (UCTV), Corporación de Televisión de la Universidad de Chile (UTV), and Corporación de Televisión de la Universidad Católica de Valparaíso (UCVTV). They agreed to allocate a budget of US$240,000 for the event. The Teleton 1978, which was originally scheduled to take place on the day chosen for the festival, was pushed one week to 8–9 December, since TVN and UCTV had already made agreements with the OTI.

The Chilean broadcasters staged the OTI Festival 1978 in Santiago. The venue selected was the Municipal Theatre, which is the most important stage theatre and opera house in the country, and can seat more than 1,500 spectators. It was opened in 1857 and was designed by Claudio Brunet des Baines. The building was built in French Neoclassical style and its entrance has been preserved despite the frequent fires, reforms, and reconstructions. They had full access to the venue from 24 November.

Right after the festival, a farewell dinner for the participating delegations was held at the Club de la Unión's pergola.

== Participants ==
Broadcasters from nineteen countries participated in this edition of the OTI Festival. The OTI members, public or private broadcasters from Spain and eighteen Spanish and Portuguese speaking countries of Ibero-America signed up for the festival. From the countries that participated in the previous edition, Guatemala, Nicaragua, and Portugal didn't return. On the other hand, Paraguay made its debut at the festival.

It was not the first time that some countries decided to withdraw, but the broadcasters always justified their decision because of economical problems or disappointing placings. In this edition, for the first time, some of the non returning broadcasters cited political reasons for taking that decision. Portugal decided to be absent as a protest of the military dictatorship of Augusto Pinochet in Chile. Nicaragua had to withdraw from the contest for two years because of the catastrophic situation created by the civil war, making this the first and only time that the winning country of the previous festival would not participate in the following edition. Guatemala decided to withdraw from the event, bitterly disappointed in the previous year's result. In addition, Bolivia, whose broadcaster was preparing its return, decided to rule out its participation because the new military government that emerged from the coup d'état that led to the overthrow of the president Hugo Banzer decided to break all diplomatic relationships with neighboring Chile.

Some of the participating broadcasters, such as those representing Chile, Mexico, the Netherlands Antilles, and the United States, selected their entries through their regular national televised competitions. Other broadcasters decided to select their entry internally.

One performing artist had previously represented the same country in previous editions: Denisse de Kalafe had represented Brazil in 1976. The festival featured the OTI entry with the longest title ever: "Pobrecito mortal, si quieres ver menos televisión, descubrirás qué aburrido estarás por la tarde" representing Chile. As was the case of the 1976 festival, all the competing songs were performed in Spanish.

Participants of the OTI Festival 1978
Country	Broadcaster(s)	Song	Artist	Songwriter(s)	Language	Conductor
Argentina	Canal Once	"Dijeron que era un niño"	Carlos Bazán	Diego Armando Fittipaldi	Spanish	Osvaldo Requena
Brazil	Rede Tupi	"El amor... cosa tan rara"	Denisse de Kalafe	Denisse de Kalafe	Spanish	Chucho Ferrer
Chile	TVN; UCTV; UTV; UCVTV	"Pobrecito mortal, si quieres ver menos televisión, descubrirás qué aburrido estarás por la tarde"	Florcita Motuda	Raúl Alarcón	Spanish	Horacio Saavedra
Colombia	Caracol Televisión; PUNCH; RTI	"Joven"	Billy Pontoni	Eduardo Cabas	Spanish	Alberto Nieto
Costa Rica	Telecentro; Teletica	"Nunca hacia atrás"	Fernando Vargas	Waldo	Spanish	Juan Azúa
Dominican Republic		"Blanca paloma"	Hilda Saldaña	Leonor Porcella de Brea	Spanish	Bienvenido Bustamante
Ecuador		"Juan el infeliz"	Gracián	Victoria Puig de Lange	Spanish	Claudio Fabbri
El Salvador	Canal Cuatro	"Gracias"	Álvaro Torres	Juan Carlos	Spanish	
Honduras		"Por esas pequeñas cosas"	Domingo Trimarchi	Francisco Javier Henández; Domingo Trimarchi	Spanish	Chucho Ferrer
Mexico	Televisa	"Como tú"	Lupita D'Alessio	Lolita de la Colina	Spanish	Chucho Ferrer
Netherlands Antilles	ATM	"Cuando un amor se muere"	Trío Huazteca	Etty Toppenberg	Spanish	Roberto Montiel
Panama		"Te cantaré, yo te amaré"	Roger Barés	Roger Barés	Spanish	
Paraguay		"Cantando"	Rolando Percy	Maneco Galeano; Jorge Krauch	Spanish	Juan Azúa
Peru		"Mujer mujer"	Homero	María Teresa de Fernández; Juan Manuel Fernández	Spanish	Amadeo Rosano
Puerto Rico	Canal 2 Telemundo	"Háblame"	Rafael José	Edgardo Díaz; Fernando de Diego	Spanish	Pedro Rivera Toledo
Spain	TVE	"Mi sitio"	Chema Purón	Chema Purón	Spanish	Julio Mengod
United States	SIN	"Ha vuelto ya"	Susy Leman	Ernesto Alejandro	Spanish	Juan Azúa
Uruguay	Sociedad Televisora Larrañaga	"Canta guitarra, canta"	Horacio Paternó	Lázaro	Spanish	Julio Frade
Venezuela	RCTV	"Con la suerte a mi favor"	Nancy Ramos	Francisco Belisario	Spanish	

== Festival overview ==
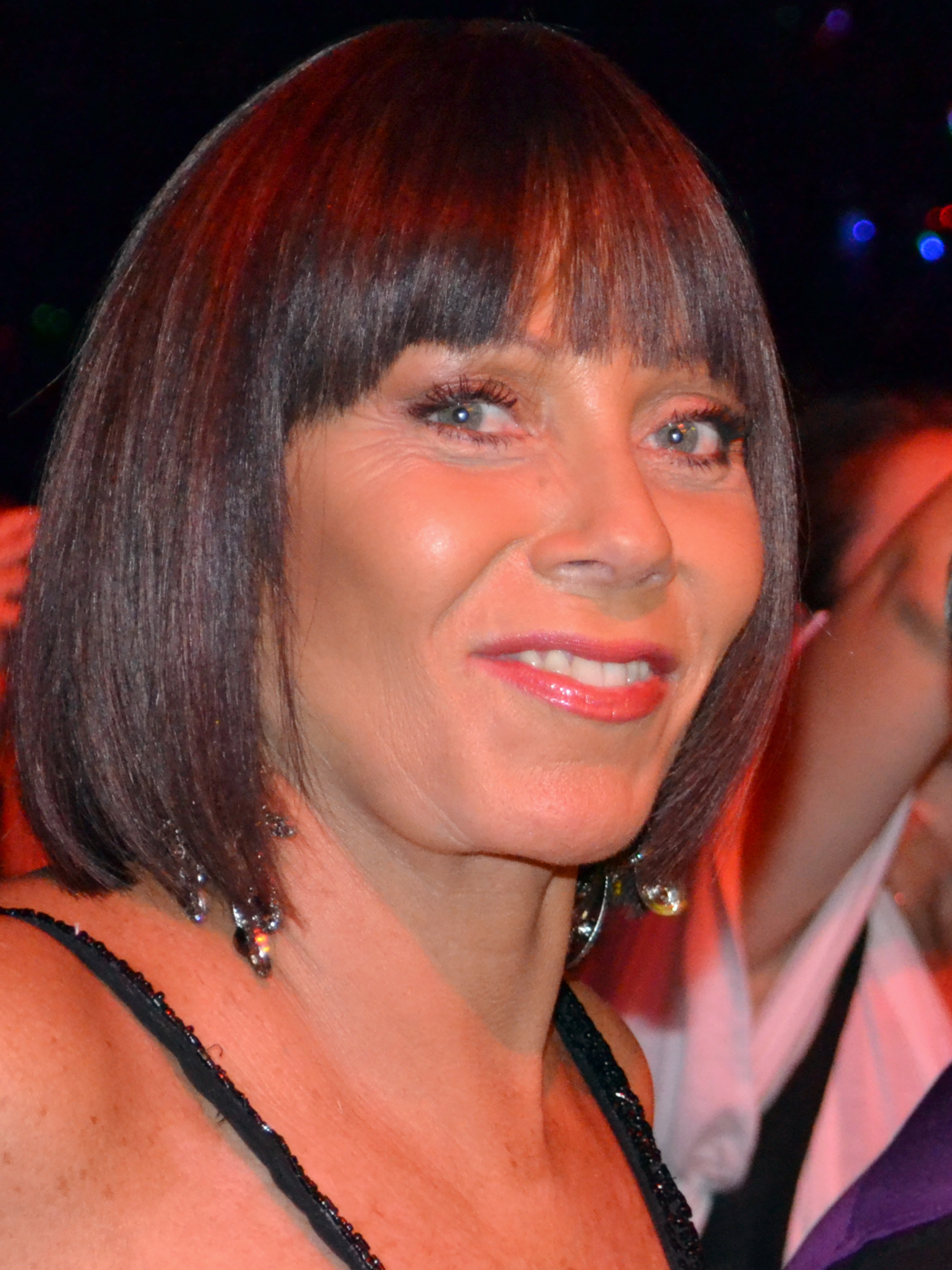
Raquel Argandoña was one of the two hosts (pictured in 2011).

The festival was held on Saturday 2 December 1978, beginning at 20:00 CLST (23:00 UTC). It was directed by Fernando Leighton, and presented by Raquel Argandoña and Raúl Matas. Matas had previously presented the inaugural OTI Festival back in 1972 in Madrid. The musical director was Juan Azúa, who conducted the 41-piece orchestra and the mixed backing choir of six voices when required. The draw to determine the running order (R/O) was held on 31 October at the TVN headquarters located in Providencia.

The opening act consisted of a recorded performance by the Ballet Folclórico de Chile on location at the doors of the theater. During the show, there were twelve two-minute segments featuring footage of places, people, and landscapes of Chile, filmed by the Tourism Board. Before the voting began, a demonstration was held using the stage set itself, which was designed by Ricardo Moreno. It began with the opening of the backdrop, then the stage floor lifted, revealing the national flag of Chile, while a panel lifted revealing the electronic scoreboard, finally showing the flags of each participating country on both sides of the scoreboard.

The winner was the song "El amor... cosa tan rara" written and performed by Denisse de Kalafe representing Brazil; with "Ha vuelto ya", written by Ernesto Alejandro, and performed by Susy Leman representing the United States, placing second; and "Como tú", written by Lolita de la Colina, and performed by Lupita D'Alessio representing Mexico, placing third. There was a plaque for each of the first three places. The first prize plaque was delivered by Eduardo Reina, vice-president of OTI; the second prize plaque by Nicanor González, president of the OTI programs committee; and the third prize plaque by Hernán García Barzelatto, vice-president of the OTI programs committee. The festival ended with a reprise of the winning entry.

Winner

Results of the OTI Festival 1978
R/O	Country	Song	Artist	Points	Place
1	Puerto Rico	"Háblame"	Rafael José	35	4
2	Costa Rica	"Nunca hacia atrás"	Fernando Vargas	3	13
3	Chile	"Pobrecito mortal, si quieres ver menos televisión, descubrirás qué aburrido estarás por la tarde"	Florcita Motuda	17	7
4	Spain	"Mi sitio"	Chema Purón	18	5
5	Paraguay	"Cantando"	Rolando Percy	0	18
6	United States	"Ha vuelto ya"	Susy Leman	46	2
7	Netherlands Antilles	"Cuando un amor se muere"	Trío Huazteca	9	10
8	Ecuador	"Juan el infeliz"	Gracián	0	18
9	Peru	"Mujer, mujer"	Homero	6	12
10	El Salvador	"Gracias"	Álvaro Torres	1	16
11	Brazil	"El amor...cosa tan rara"	Denisse de Kalafe	51	1
12	Uruguay	"Canta guitarra, canta"	Horacio Paternó	3	13
13	Mexico	"Como tú"	Lupita D'Alessio	44	3
14	Venezuela	"Con la suerte a mi favor"	Nancy Ramos	2	15
15	Colombia	"Joven"	Billy Pontoni	1	16
16	Honduras	"Por esas pequeñas cosas"	Domingo Trimarchi	12	8
17	Dominican Republic	"Blanca paloma"	Hilda Saldaña	12	8
18	Argentina	"Dijeron que era un niño"	Carlos Bazán	7	11
19	Panama	"Te cantaré, yo te amaré"	Roger Barés	18	5

=== Spokespersons ===
Each participating broadcaster (Note: Or group of broadcasters that jointly participated representing a country.) appointed a spokesperson who was responsible for announcing the points for their respective jury in descending order. Known spokespersons at the 1978 festival are listed below.

- Chile – Alfredo Lamadrid
- El Salvador – Altagracia Arévalo
- Venezuela – Carmen Victoria Pérez
- Colombia – Carlos Pinzón
- Argentina – Juan Alberto Mateyko

== Detailed voting results ==
This festival saw the first major change in the voting system in its history. Each participating broadcaster assembled a national jury located in its respective country, consisting of four voting members and a president who would only decide in case of a tie. Each voting member scored each performance, except the entry representing its own country, between 1 and 5 votes right after it was performed, and at the end the president totaled all the scores and awarded 5 points to the most voted, 4 to the second, and so on down to 1 point. Each participating broadcaster had also a delegate present in the hall to stand in for its jury if it was not receiving the event live, or in case of communication failure during the broadcast or voting. To ensure that there was no vote switching, before the voting segment began each participating broadcaster announced to its national audience the vote of its jury in local opt-out from its studios. In the event of a tie for first place, the stand-in delegates from the countries not affected by the tie would vote to select the winning song from among the tied ones. The Chilean jury was the only one present in the hall.

All the countries gave their points remotely by telephone, except for Puerto Rico, Paraguay, Netherlands Antilles, and the Dominican Republic, which used the stand-in delegates. The countries voted in order of participation, but due to a communication problem with the spokesperson of Brazil, this had to be left for the end, with the country being unable to respond and having to also use the stand-in delegate.

Winner

Detailed voting results of the OTI Festival 1978
Voter: National jury Stand-in delegate		Voting countries																			Points
Voter: National jury Stand-in delegate		Puerto Rico	Costa Rica	Chile	Spain	Paraguay	United States	Netherlands Antilles	Ecuador	Peru	El Salvador	Brazil	Uruguay	Mexico	Venezuela	Colombia	Honduras	Dominican Republic	Argentina	Panama	Points
Contestants	Puerto Rico		2		1			2		3	3		3	4	3	4	1	1	4	4	35
Contestants	Costa Rica							3													3
Contestants	Chile	2				5						5	1					4			17
Contestants	Spain			4		3			3					3	1	2	2				18
Contestants	Paraguay																				0
Contestants	United States	4	3	2	2				1	2		4	4	5	5	3	3	3	2	3	46
Contestants	Netherlands Antilles						4		2	1										2	9
Contestants	Ecuador																				0
Contestants	Peru						3					1		2							6
Contestants	El Salvador							1													1
Contestants	Brazil	5	4	5	5	4			5	5	5				2	1	5	5			51
Contestants	Uruguay					1					1			1							3
Contestants	Mexico		1	3			5			4	4	2			4	5	4	2	5	5	44
Contestants	Venezuela			1															1		2
Contestants	Colombia																			1	1
Contestants	Honduras				4		2		4		2										12
Contestants	Dominican Republic	3				2		4											3		12
Contestants	Argentina							5					2								7
Contestants	Panama	1	5		3		1					3	5								18

== Broadcast ==
The festival was broadcast in the 19 participating countries, and in Guatemala and Portugal, where the corresponding OTI member broadcasters relayed the contest through their networks after receiving it live via satellite.

Known details on the broadcasts of the festival in each country, including the specific broadcasting stations, commentators, and presenters of the local opt-out are shown in the tables below.

Broadcasters, commentators, and local presenters in participating countries
Country	Broadcaster	Channel(s)	Commentator(s)	Local presenter(s)	Ref.
Argentina	Canal Once (Note: Delayed broadcast at 20:30 DST (23:30 UTC))				
Chile	TVN	Canal 7		Rodolfo Torrealba	
Chile	UTV	Canal 9		Rodolfo Torrealba	
Chile	UCTV	Canal 13		Rodolfo Torrealba	
Chile	UCVTV	Canal 5		Rodolfo Torrealba	
Colombia	Inravisión (Note: Through the programadoras: Caracol Televisión, Producciones Nacionales Colombianas de Hoy (PUNCH), and Radio Televisión Interamericana (RTI).)	Segunda Cadena			
Costa Rica	Telecentro	Telecentro Canal 6			
Costa Rica	Teletica	Canal 7			
Netherlands Antilles	ATM	TeleCuraçao (Note: Delayed broadcast on 9 December at 22:00 AST (02:00+1 UTC))			
Spain	TVE	TVE 1			
United States	SIN				

== Reception ==
The festival had an estimated potential global audience of 300 million viewers. In Chile, the show was acclaimed due to the successful organization of the four Chilean broadcasters, and the fact that it was one of the first color broadcasts in the country. The quality of the sound system and the stage were also highly valued by the national media.

Denise de Kalafe's career was boosted not only in Brazil, but also in Mexico, where she found a growing fanbase. Her success in that country led to her move to Mexico. She holds a dual Mexican-Brazilian citizenship.

The Mexican entrant, Lupita D'Alessio was arguably the most acclaimed performer and the most remembered one after the festival. In fact, she turned into one of the most recognised female vocalist in all Latin America. Her third place in the contest launched her career in all the Spanish speaking world to the point that she has released more than twenty studio albums and hit songs. Her success in the festival also boosted her acting career in famous Telenovelas during the 1970s and 1980s decades. She also took part in one film during her career.

The Spanish singer-songwriter Chema Purón also saw his career expanded. As a singer, he released five albums after his participation in the OTI Festival. During his career he composed many song for both Spanish and Latin American singers such as the Venezuelan José Luis Rodríguez. He also composed many Spanish entries in both the OTI Festival and in the Eurovision Song Contest, such as "Colgado de un sueño" for Serafín Zubiri and "Vuelve conmigo" for Anabel Conde (which got the second place in the Eurovision Song Contest 1995).

Other contestants such as Salvadoran Álvaro Torres, Colombian Billy Pontoni, and Puerto Rican Rafael José saw their careers boosted.
