= Cartago, Valle del Cauca =

Cartago
- Municipality and city
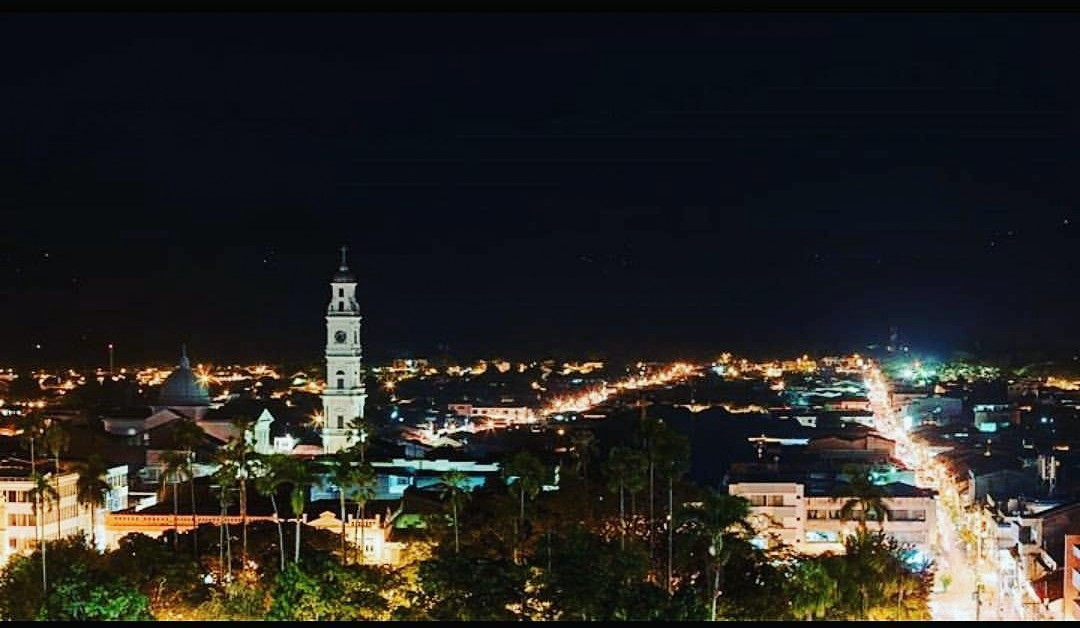
- Aerial view of Cartago with the Cathedral of Cartago to the left side.

- Flag Coat of arms

- Location of the municipality and town of Cartago, Colombia in the Valle del Cauca Department of Colombia.

- Location in Colombia
- Coordinates: 4°42′N 75°55′W
- Country: Colombia
- Department: Valle del Cauca Department
- Founded: 1540

Area
  - Total: 279 km^{2} (108 sq mi)
- Elevation: 917 m (3,009 ft)

Population (2023 est.)
  - Total: 142,902
  - Density: 512/km^{2} (1,330/sq mi)
- Demonym: Cartagüeño
- Time zone: UTC-5 (Colombia Standard Time)
- Area code: 57 + 2
- Climate: Af
- Website: cartago.gov.co (in Spanish)

Cartago (Spanish pronunciation: [kaɾˈtaɣo]) is a city in southwestern Colombia, about 301 kilometres (187 mi) west of Bogotá. It is in the extreme northern portion of the Valle del Cauca. It is located very close to the city of Pereira, Risaralda about a 20-minute drive. It is the sixth largest city in Valle after Cali, Palmira, Buenaventura, Tuluá and Jamundí. Per the 2018 Colombian census, Cartago's population was 142,902.

== Overview ==
Cartago features warm weather with an average of 24°C, Over the course of the year, the temperature typically varies from 20°C (67°F) to 29°C (84°F) and is rarely below 19°C (66°F) or above 31°C (88°F). The city is home to multiple farmhouses and farm owners, recreational sites, discos and condos frequented by people coming from Pereira.

== Education ==
The University of Valle has a branch campus in Cartago. The main Universidad del Valle campus is based in Cali, the department capital. The Cartago branch campus address is located at Calle 10 N° 19–05. Private institutions include the Instituto Técnico Colombiano, INTEC Cartago and Sena Institute.

== Culture ==
Artesanías (handcrafted products) are sold in several roadside shop in the city.

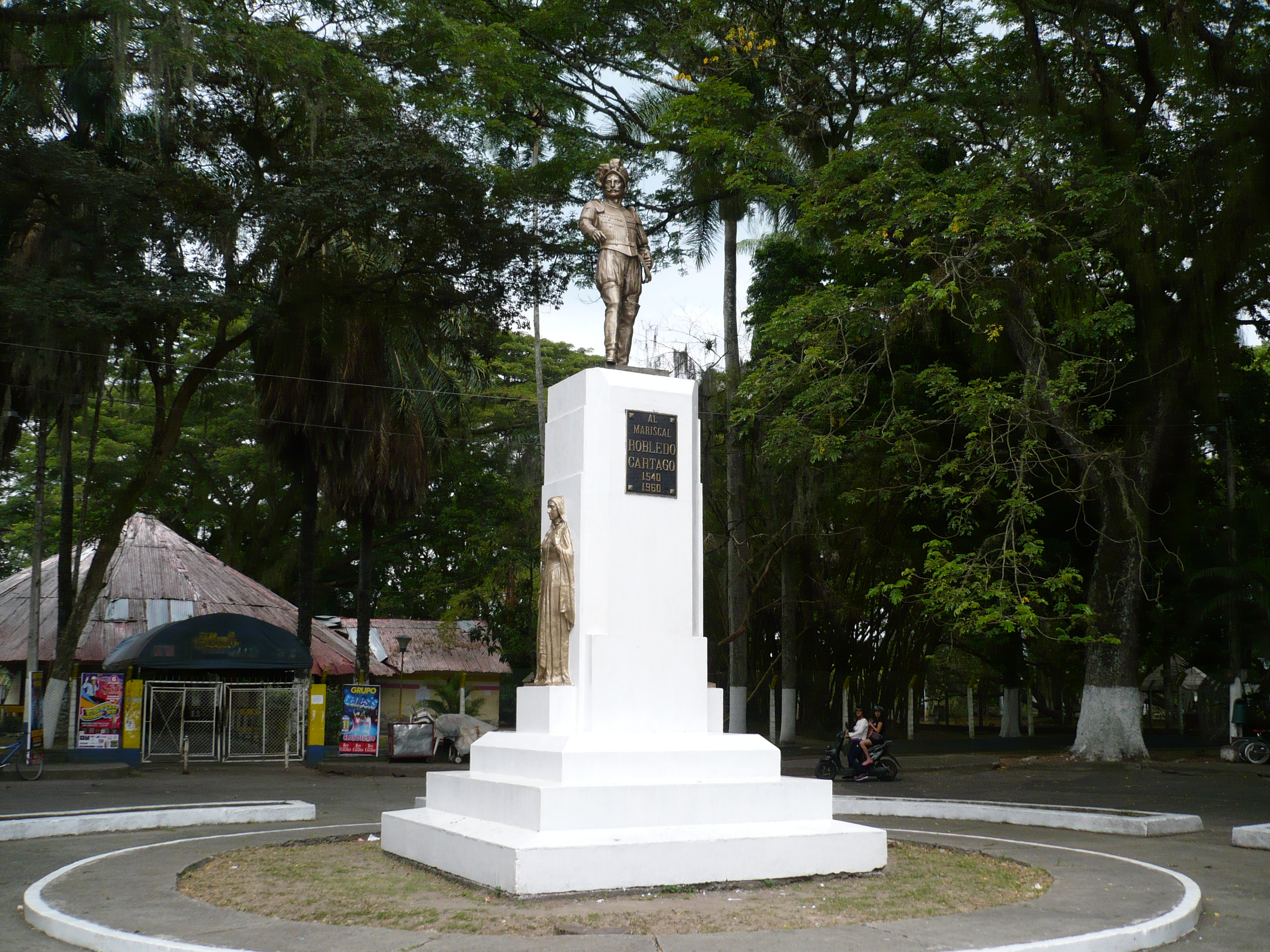
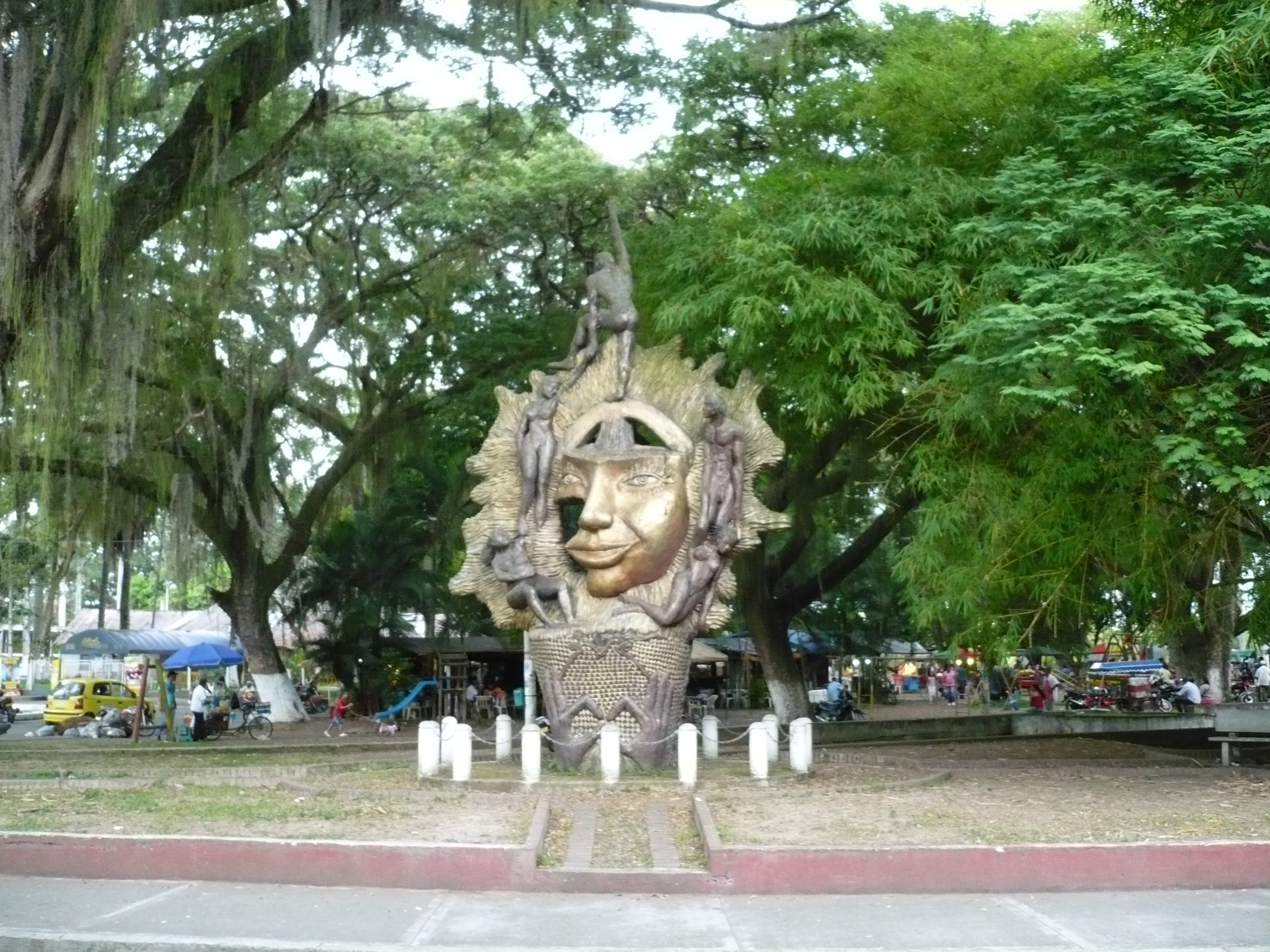
Left: Conquistador Jorge Robledo, founder of the city. Right: Monument to the Sun, La Isleta Park.

An 1856 watercolor of a Castizo couple in a roadside shop by Manuel María Paz is an early depiction of Cartago. Afro Colombians also resided in the town at that time.

Festivals include:

- Pedro Morales Pino Festival of Andean Colombian Music (Spanish: Festival de Música Andina Colombiana Pedro Morales Pino) (February 4-March 4)—commenced in 2013 on the occasion of Morales Pino's sesquicentennial, a prominent local Bandola virtuoso, and organized by the local conservatory that bears his name.
- Feria de diseño independiente LAS PULGAS, organized by 3 VECES. (March and December)
- Encuentro Nacional de las Familias que Cantan, organized by EL CONSERVATORIO PEDRO MORALES PINO (July)

== Transportation ==
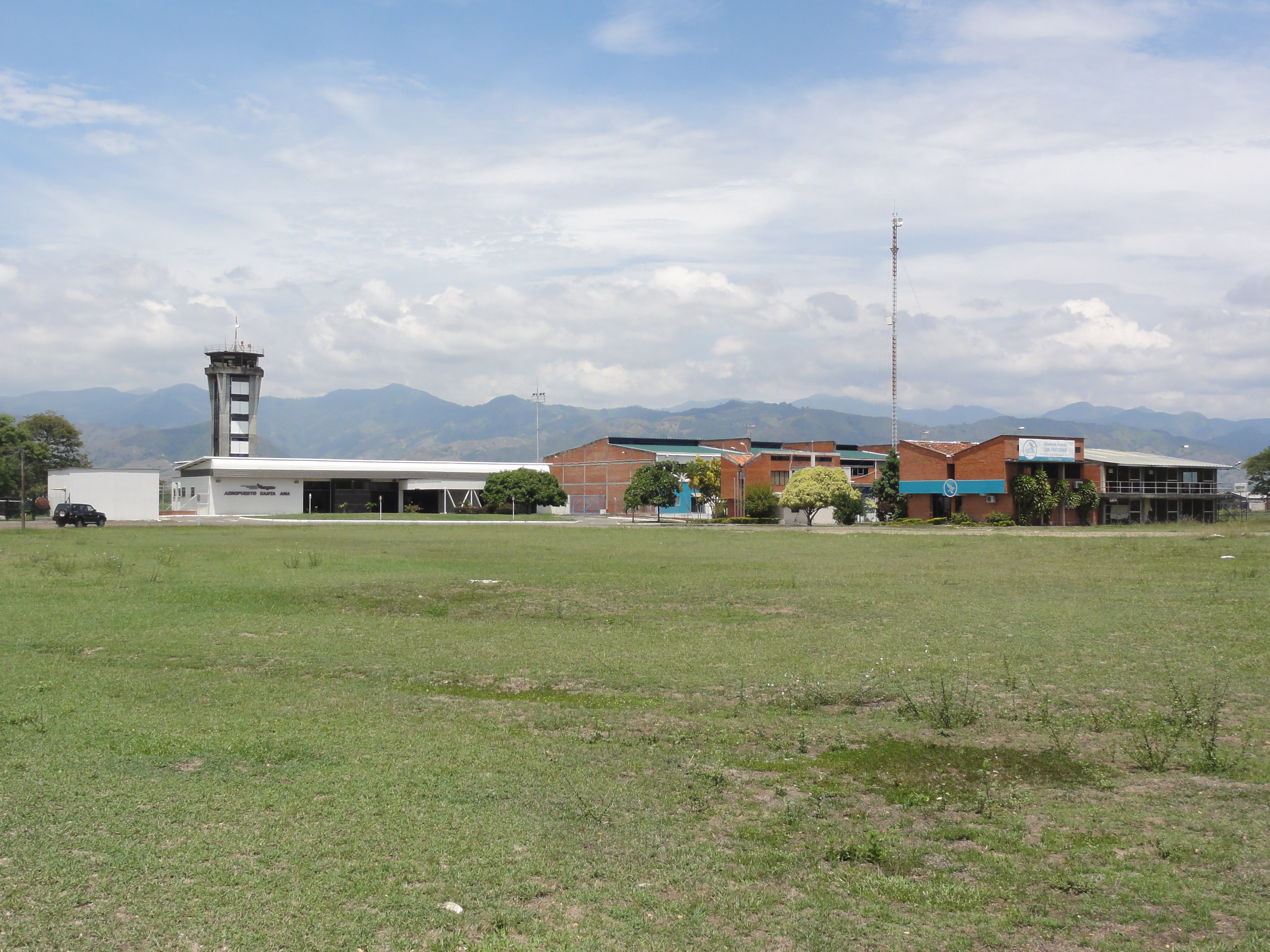
Santa Ana Airport. Cartago, Valle del Cauca, Colombia.

- Santa Ana Airport
- Matecaña International Airport, serves the nearby city of Pereira
- Cartago has an extensive network for taxis in the city, as well as minibuses (called busetas).

== Notable people ==
- Billy Pontoni – singer

== Climate ==
Climate data for La Virginia (Note: La Virginia is located approximately 17 kilometres (10.6 mi) north of Cartago.), elevation 970 m (3,180 ft), (1981–2010)
| Month | Jan | Feb | Mar | Apr | May | Jun | Jul | Aug | Sep | Oct | Nov | Dec | Year |
|---|---|---|---|---|---|---|---|---|---|---|---|---|---|
| Mean daily maximum °C (°F) | 30.6 (87.1) | 31.0 (87.8) | 30.6 (87.1) | 29.9 (85.8) | 29.6 (85.3) | 29.7 (85.5) | 30.3 (86.5) | 30.7 (87.3) | 30.5 (86.9) | 29.5 (85.1) | 29.2 (84.6) | 29.6 (85.3) | 30.1 (86.2) |
| Daily mean °C (°F) | 24.1 (75.4) | 24.3 (75.7) | 24.2 (75.6) | 23.9 (75.0) | 23.8 (74.8) | 23.9 (75.0) | 24.1 (75.4) | 24.4 (75.9) | 23.9 (75.0) | 23.4 (74.1) | 23.4 (74.1) | 23.7 (74.7) | 23.9 (75.0) |
| Mean daily minimum °C (°F) | 19.1 (66.4) | 19.3 (66.7) | 19.3 (66.7) | 19.5 (67.1) | 19.5 (67.1) | 19.1 (66.4) | 18.8 (65.8) | 18.7 (65.7) | 18.8 (65.8) | 18.9 (66.0) | 19.1 (66.4) | 19.1 (66.4) | 19.1 (66.4) |
| Average precipitation mm (inches) | 109.3 (4.30) | 105.7 (4.16) | 176.0 (6.93) | 210.5 (8.29) | 247.2 (9.73) | 148.4 (5.84) | 131.0 (5.16) | 122.2 (4.81) | 161.3 (6.35) | 184.6 (7.27) | 216.7 (8.53) | 139.4 (5.49) | 1,952.3 (76.86) |
| Average precipitation days | 13 | 13 | 17 | 20 | 20 | 17 | 14 | 13 | 16 | 20 | 20 | 16 | 197 |
| Average relative humidity (%) | 74 | 73 | 75 | 78 | 80 | 78 | 74 | 72 | 74 | 77 | 78 | 77 | 76 |
| Mean monthly sunshine hours | 198.4 | 166.6 | 170.5 | 141.0 | 148.8 | 150.0 | 182.9 | 186.0 | 162.0 | 151.9 | 156.0 | 179.8 | 1,993.9 |
| Mean daily sunshine hours | 6.4 | 5.9 | 5.5 | 4.7 | 4.8 | 5.0 | 5.9 | 6.0 | 5.4 | 4.9 | 5.2 | 5.8 | 5.5 |
Source: Instituto de Hidrologia Meteorologia y Estudios Ambientales
