= United States in the OTI Festival 1978 =

- OTI Festival 1978
- Participating broadcaster: Spanish International Network (SIN)
- Country: United States
- Selection process: National OTI–SIN Festival
- Selection date: 14 October 1978

Competing entry
- Song: "Ha vuelto ya"
- Artist: Susy Leman
- Songwriter: Ernesto Alejandro

Placement
- Final result: 2nd, 46 points

Participation chronology
◄1977 •	1978	• 1979►

The United States was represented at the OTI Festival 1978 with the song "Ha vuelto ya", written by Ernesto Alejandro and performed by Susy Leman. The participating broadcaster representing the country, the Spanish International Network (SIN), selected its entry through a national televised competition. The song, that was performed in position 6, placed second out of 19 competing entries, with 46 points.

== National stage ==
The Spanish International Network (SIN) held a national televised competition to select its entry for the 7th edition of the OTI Festival. This was the first edition of the National OTI–SIN Festival. In the final, each song represented a SIN affiliate, each of which had selected its entry through a local pre-selection.

=== Miami pre-selection ===
WLTV held an internal pre-selection. The song selected for the national final was "Ha vuelto ya", written by Ernesto Alejandro and performed by Susy Leman.

=== Final ===
The final was held on Saturday 14 October 1978 at the Miami Jai-Alai Fronton in Miami, featuring six songs. It was broadcast live on all SIN affiliates. The winner was "Ha vuelto ya" representing WLTV–Miami, written by Ernesto Alejandro and performed by Susy Leman.

Winner

Result of the final of the National OTI–SIN Festival 1978 (Note: Incomplete list of the competing entries.)
R/O	Song	Artist	Affiliate	Result
	"Ha vuelto ya"	Susy Leman	WLTV–Miami	1

== At the OTI Festival ==
On 2 December 1978, the OTI Festival was held at the Municipal Theatre in Santiago, Chile, hosted by Televisión Nacional de Chile (TVN), Corporación de Televisión de la Universidad Católica de Chile (UCTV), Corporación de Televisión de la Universidad de Chile (UTV), and Corporación de Televisión de la Universidad Católica de Valparaíso (UCVTV), and broadcast live throughout Ibero-America. Susy Leman performed "Ha vuelto ya" in position 6, with Juan Azúa conducting the event's orchestra, and placing second out of 19 competing entries, with 46 points.

=== Voting ===
Each participating broadcaster, or group of broadcasters that jointly participated representing a country, assembled a jury who awarded 5–1 points to their five favourite songs in order of preference.

Points awarded to the United States
Score	Country
5 points	Mexico; Venezuela
4 points	Brazil; Puerto Rico; Uruguay
3 points	Colombia; Costa Rica; Dominican Republic; Honduras; Panama
2 points	Argentina; Chile; Peru; Spain
1 point	Ecuador

Points awarded by the United States
Score	Country
5 points	Mexico
4 points	Netherlands Antilles
3 points	Peru
2 points	Honduras
1 point	Panama
