= Billy Pontoni =

- Born: Guillermo García Ocampo; 20 February 1954 (age 72)
- Origin: Cartago, Valle del Cauca, Colombia
- Genres: Colombian folk music, bolero, ranchera
- Occupations: Singer-songwriter, guitarist
- Instrument: Guitar
- Years active: 1972–present
- Label: BIP Music
- Website: www.billypontoni.com

Guillermo García Ocampo (born 1954), better known as Billy Pontoni, is a Colombian singer-songwriter and guitarist. He joined the Pedro Morales Pino conservatory in his hometown Cartago, Colombia as a child. Then he became one of the artists from the Youths Club in Radio Cartago, in which he made his first appearances as a singer. In 1966 he arrived to Bogotá searching for an opportunity. There he became a regular performer at the Club del Clan TV Show, where his name was changed to Billy. At 14 he signed a contract with the Grill El Caracol Rojo as lead vocalist.

After that he started working with the Tropibomba Orchestra. In early 1971 he toured the Americas, with Colombian folk singer Luis Ariel Rey. The same year he started working for the "Miramar" club. There he met Pacheco, a famous Colombian TV show host. Billy suggested to Pacheco using the last name Pontoni in honor of singer Rocky Pontoni and he agreed. Pacheco then introduced him as local idol Billy Pontoni at several TV shows.

In 1978, he was selected to represent Colombia in the seventh edition of the OTI Festival, which was held in Santiago, Chile. Although his song "Joven" ended second to last, his career went on successfully.

Because of the surprising reception, CBS (now known as Sony Music) signed him as an exclusive artist. Since then he has released many hits in several musical styles: Alguien cantó una canción, Dime qué pasó, Por qué ahora, Borra, Luna Roja, I like mena, Angélica, retarda, Cómo hacerle entender que la amo, Tu Complemento and many more.

Pontoni has gotten many gold records and international prizes. He has shared the stage with many people such as Julio Iglesias, Camilo Sesto, Raphael, Joan Manuel Serrat, and Daniel Santos.

After a break of seven years, Billy Pontoni released his latest album Nada es igual in 2008 under his own music label BIP Music.
