= Santa Ana Airport (Colombia) =

Santa Ana Airport Aeropuerto Nacional de Santa Ana
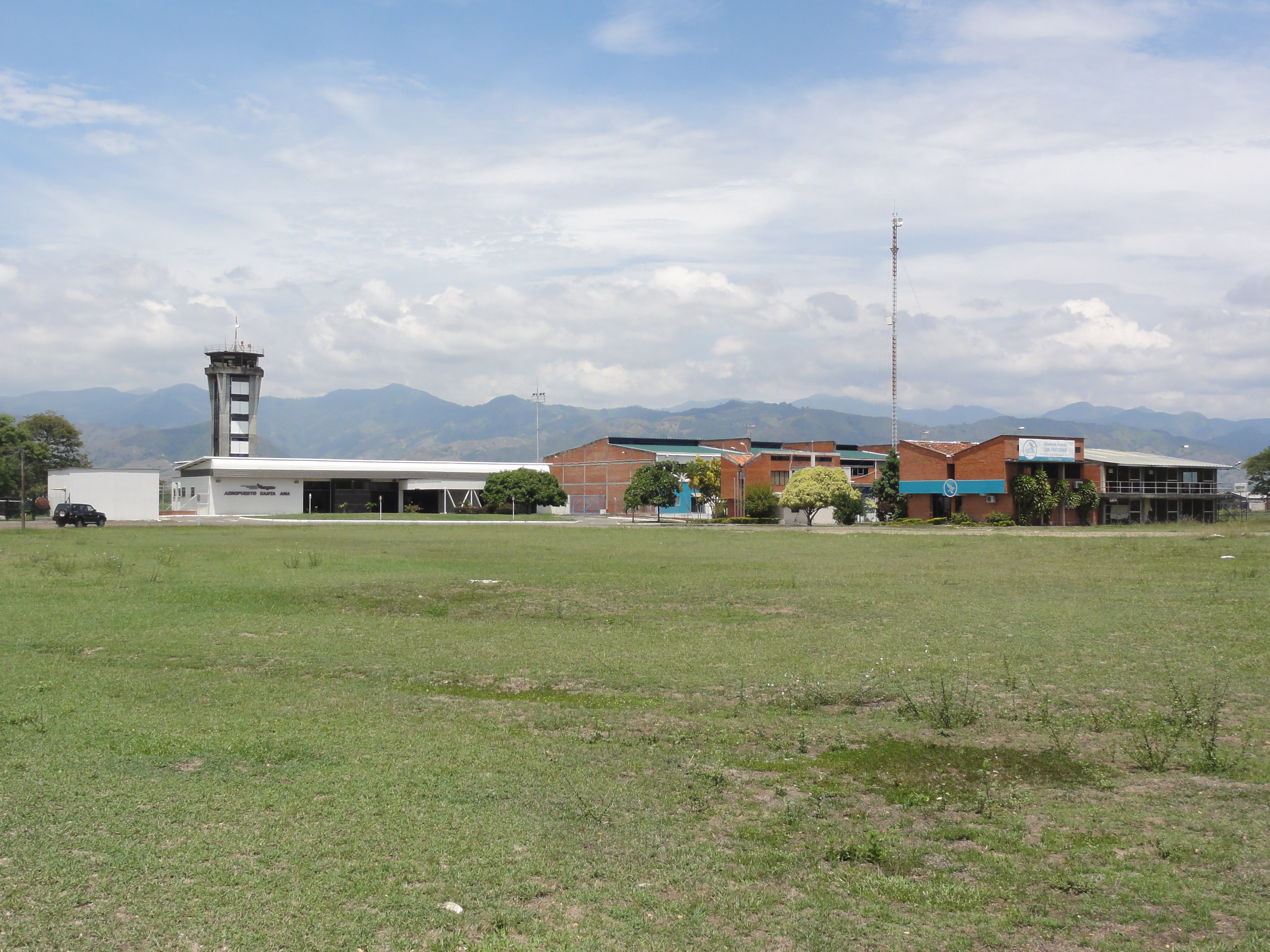
- IATA: CRC; ICAO: SKGO

Summary
- Airport type: Public
- Owner/Operator: Aerocivil
- Serves: Cartago, Colombia
- Elevation AMSL: 2,979 ft (908 m)
- Coordinates: 4°45′40″N 75°57′20″W

Map
- Location of airport in Colombia

Runways
Direction	Length		Surface
Direction	m	ft	Surface
01/19	2,200	7,218	Asphalt
- Sources: WAD GCM Google Maps

Santa Ana Airport (Spanish: Aeropuerto Nacional de Santa Ana) (IATA: CRC, ICAO: SKGO) is an airport serving Cartago, a city in the Valle del Cauca Department of Colombia.

Runway 19 has a 165 metres (541 ft) displaced threshold.

== Airlines and destinations ==
Airlines	Destinations
SATENA	Quibdó

== See also ==
- Transport in Colombia
- List of airports in Colombia
