= Fulano (band) =

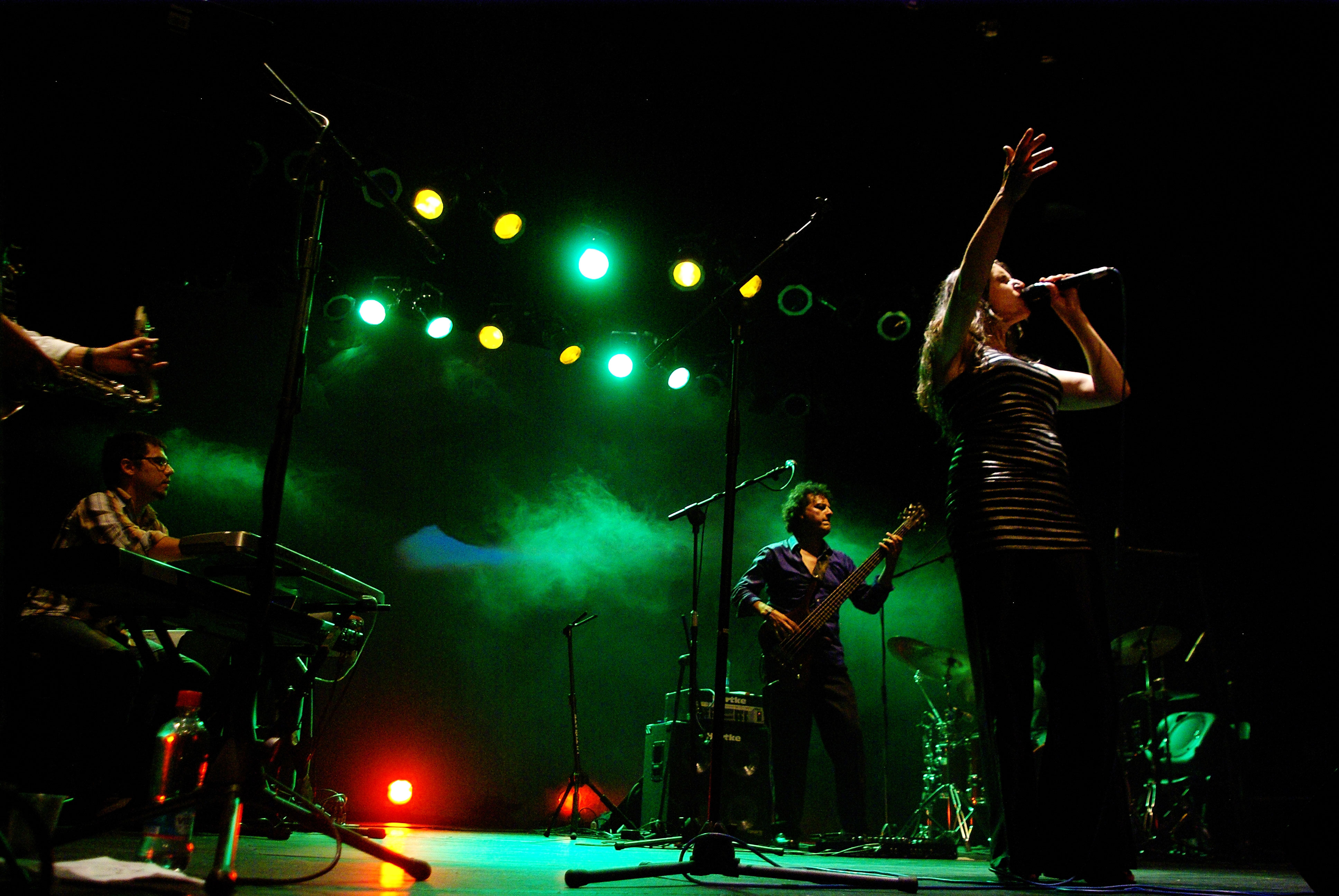

Background information
- Origin: Santiago, Chile
- Genres: Progressive rock; jazz rock; rock in opposition; alternative rock; art rock; post-punk; punk jazz; Latin alternative; experimental; avant-garde; contemporary classical music
- Years active: 1984–2003, 2009–2015
- Website: www.grupofulano.cl

Fulano was a Chilean rock band. They were one of the most important bands in the development of jazz-rock in Chile or, as described by musicologist Juan Pablo González, of "anti-hegemonic eclecticism". With an oeuvre consisting of six high quality and virtuosic albums, they have been widely recognised as pillars of jazz-rock and experimental music in Latin America.

Fulano was founded in 1984 in Santiago de Chile by members of Santiago del Nuevo Extremo: Jorge Campos (bass), Cristián Crisosto, (saxophones and flute), Jaime Vivanco (keyboards), and Willy Valenzuela (drums); joined by Arlette Jequier (voice and clarinet), and Jaime Vásquez (saxophones and flute).

Their first era lasted from 1984 till 2003, releasing four studio albums Fulano (1987), En el Bunker (In the Bunker, 1989), El infierno de los payasos (Hell of the clowns, 1993), and Trabajos Inútiles (Useless works, 1997). These albums were particular in their creative complexity and the very original fusion of varied stylistic and musical elements. They also stood out for their instrumental and vocal virtuosity and the ironic, humorous and, especially, antiestablishment lyrics against the military dictatorship of Augusto Pinochet, and later the Chilean transition to democracy. The group positioned itself from the start as one of the most influential fusion bands of Latin America, although always keeping an uneasy relationship with mass media. They decided to dissolve after the tragic death of Jaime Vivanco in 2003, releasing the live album Vivo (Alive) (2004), which contained Vivanco's last performances.

The second era began in 2009 when they decided to reform, with Raúl Aliaga on drums, who had been playing since 1996, and Felipe Muñoz on keyboards. They released a live DVD entitled La Farsa Continúa (The Farce Continues, 2011), and after multiple changes in the line up, a fifth and final studio album entitled Animal en Extinción (Endangered animal, 2015), that counted only with Crisosto and Campos from the original members, with Paquita Rivera in charge of vocals, after which the dissolution of the band is announced at the end of 2015. Since then, three posthumous live albums have been released: La Batuta 1993, En vivo en Los Ángeles 2002 (Live in Los Angeles), and En directo FestivAlterNativo México 2010. A tribute album from MediaBanda entitled ''Maquinarias'' was released in 2021.

== History ==
=== Formation and debut album (1984–1988) ===
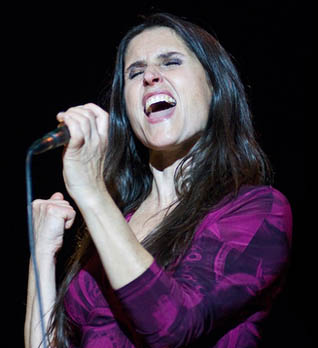
Arlette Jequier vocalist of the band

In 1984, still members of Santiago del Nuevo Extremo, Jorge Campos, Cristián Crisosto and Guillermo Valenzuela started rehearsing and experimenting new sounds on the side. At one point the trio, under the name Mediabanda, invited Arlette Jequier, Jaime Vivanco, and then Jaime Vásquez to continue expanding the sounds of their new music. Only once the last three arrived Fulano properly emerged, as a group that consciously sought the development and fusion of rock, jazz and various other styles that were in the mix. The band's strongest influences and sources were almost unattainable in the isolation and repression of Pinochet's dictatorial Chile in the early 1980s, such as Weather Report, Return to Forever, King Crimson, Magma, Frank Zappa, Hermeto Pascoal, Miles Davis, John Coltrane, also singers like Maggie Nicols, Ursula Dudziak, Meredith Monk and Janis Joplin as well as the European avant-garde movement "Rock in Opposition" characterised by its rejection of the music industry.

They began performing in various cultural and university spaces of Santiago de Chile, giving their first concert at the Espaciocal Cultural Center in 1986. The following year they released their first self titled album (which contained fan favourites Maquinarias, Tango, Fulano, 1989, Suite Recoleta and Calcetín perseguido), through which they broke through to a larger and more heterogenous audience, away from the academic minded one of their origins. This is made clear in August 1988, when over four thousand people attend a concert held at the Nataniel Stadium of Santiago de Chile. Their unique sound, the versatile voice of Arlette Jequier and the multi-instrumentalist prowess of the band members made the project grow, which in its beginnings was cataloged as a derivative of jazz fusion, however, as Vivanco clarified at the time, "none of us studied that style or dares to consider himself a jazzman".

=== En el bunker and El infierno de los payasos (1989–1994) ===
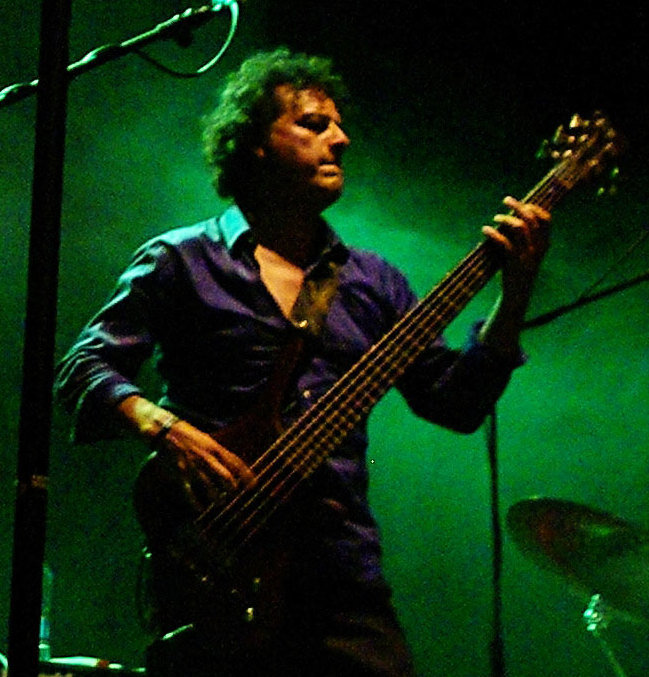
Jorge Campos bassist and composer

In 1989 Fulano released their second album: En el Bunker, a double "cassette" with more than 100 minutes of music. Arguably the longest music release ever recorded in Chile, its incredible display of virtuosity and musical quality, together with its satirical lyrics, enshrined the band as one of the best "jazz fusion" bands in South America. Compositions such as Sentimental Blues, La historia no me convence solo me atraganta (History does not convince me, it just chokes me), No me gusta que se metan conmigo (I do not like them messing with me), Perro chico malo (Bad little dog), Buhardillas (Attic), El dar del cuerpo (The giving of the Body) and the popular Adolfo, Benito, Augusto, Merino (Adolfo, Benito, Augusto, Toribio), are significant examples in the creative history of the band. The album won the APES Prize (Asociación Periodistas de Espectáculos de Chile), in the "Contribution to Jazz" category and the "Best Rock Group 1989" Award from the now defunct Radio Concierto, which seemed strange at the time, as the songs strayed far from the logic of singles or video clips typical of the times. Although in their very particular and different style, the critical lyrics and the rebellious attitude of the band marked a rejection of the military dictatorship brought them closer to the Nueva Canción Chilena or the rock of Los Prisioneros, than the more popular pop and rock groups of the era.

During 1991 and 1992, the group dedicates itself completely to the composition of their new album, which finally comes out in 1993, dubbed El infierno de los payasos (Hell of the Clowns), from which they produced their first and only video clip, Lamentos. This new album, much more rockier than the previous ones, stands out with songs like Basura (Trash), Fuegos artificiales (Fireworks), Convicciones (Convictions), Morbosadoquista (Morbosadochist) and the ironic Contribución al jazz (Contribution to Jazz), a 15 second reference to the previously mentioned prize..

As the band gained international recognition, in 1990 they were invited to Havana, Cuba, to participate in the Jazz Plaza Festival 90', along with musicians such as Dizzy Gillespie, Arturo Sandoval, Chico Freeman, Airto Moreira and Irakere. In 1994 they appear together with the legendary Brazilian multi-instrumentalist Hermeto Pascoal in the Teatro Municipal of Viña del Mar and in October of that same year, they celebrated their 10 years of history in the University of Chile Theatre, which included the re-release of the album En el bunker for CD format. Two covers were used, one red and one blue, replacing the original image of a tank cannon with a picture of a metal door under several padlocks. The CD release added three long compositions pieces called Y ahora qué (And now, what?), No me gusta que se metan conmigo (I do not like them messing with me) and Que o la tumba serás (What or the grave you will be), while others were shortened.

=== Trabajos Inútiles and death of Vivanco (1996–2004) ===
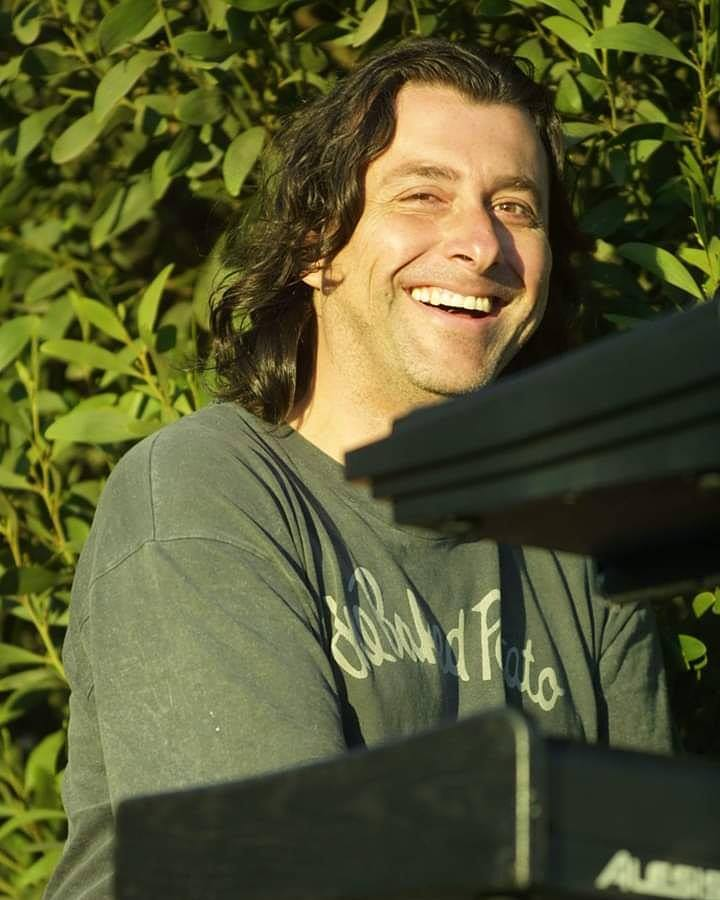
Jaime Vivanco, composer and pianist

In 1996, after a two year hiatus, and with drummer Willy Valenzuela settled in the United States, Raúl Aliaga joins the band from Congreso. A first compilation album was released by selecting from the first three albums, which was quickly followed by their fourth album, and first independently released, called "Trabajos Inútiles" (Useless works), co-produced with Fernando Lyon in the Master Studios of Santiago de Chile (all previous albums had been released by Sello Alerce). This album features Godzilla, Canción formal (En 7/8), Más allá del deber, Rope, cochi, loma (a sophisticated arrangement of the theme Perro chico malo, or 'Little bad dog'), Krikalev and Arañas de tribunal. After the album's release, and the replacement of Jaime Vásquez with the saxophonist Rafael Chaparro, Fulano kept playing live. Their last concert of that period, on October 31, 2002, at the Providencia Theatre, celebrated the band's at that time 18-year career. However, tragedy occurs on January 17, 2003, when Jaime Vivanco, keyboardist and one of the main composers of the band, dies of a pulmonary edema, his body found at his house. After this terrible event, Jorge Campos, the band's bassist and the other members decided not to continue with the Fulano project, as they considered Vásquez a fundamental pillar in the band, both as composer and instrumentalist. As a way to honour his memory and end the band on a high note, the remaining members of Fulano released a live album "Vivo" (2004), culled from concerts in 2002, that is, their last dates before Vivanco's death. The album featured songs that ran throughout their career, but recorded in a much better quality than the first two albums, while adding two new songs called Pinocchio in Patolandia and Todas las ratas del mundo (All the Rats of the World). After this, the band went into an indefinite hiatus, during which a documentary was made, directed by Pablo Leighton, that portrays the history of the group, with performances, interviews and photographs, as a sort of epilogue for its then 18 years of history. After that, the band members occupied themselves with other projects: Jorge Campos announced a third solo album, Jaime Vásquez organized an avant-garde septet, Raúl Aliaga remained as a percussionist in Congreso and other personal projects in world music, while the marriage Crisosto-Jequier resurrected MediaBanda along with a large contingent of young musicians that included their daughter Regina Crisosto as a second vocalist.

=== Return, reformation, and 30th anniversary (2009–2014) ===
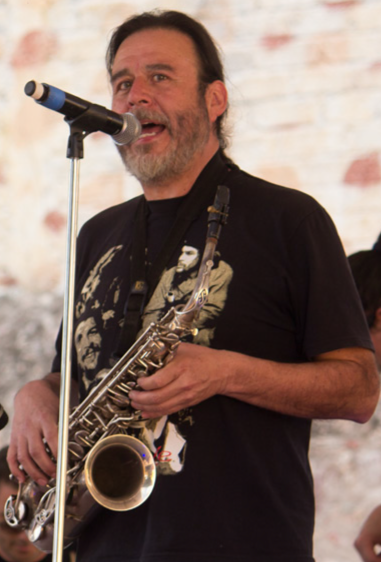
Cristián Crisosto, saxophonist and composer

In 2009, after repeatedly closing the door to a Fulano reunion, the band announces its reformation in order to celebrate their 25th anniversary with a concert entitled La Farsa Continúa (The Farce Continues) at the Teatro Oriente in Chile, with then 25 year-old Felipe Muñoz filling Vivanco's shoes and saxophonist and flutist Jaime Vásquez rejoining the band. In December that same year, a new concert marked the occasion of 20 years since the release of En el Bunker. During 2010 the group continued giving concerts throughout Chile, as well as letting it know that they were working on a new album. At the request of Mike Patton (who counted Fulano as major influence in their music), they joined Faith No More on their tour of Chile, with a concert held at the Bicentennial Municipal Stadium of La Florida on December 5, 2010, where they also shared the bill with Primus and Monotonix. In August 2011 the band finally releases the DVD La Farsa Continúa (The Farce Continues), in what was the first audio-visual record of the band since the video clip of Lamentos in 1993.

On April 16, 2012, Raúl Aliaga announces his departure from the group "My thanks to have shared a great career with an emblematic band in Chilean culture. Everything in life has a beginning and an end. Dismissal of all those who made it possible all these years to be drummer and have developed an important part of the story". On January 2, 2013, they announced: "To all our followers and friends, we inform you that Arlette Jequier has left Fulano for personal reasons, and we deeply regret her departure." However, they confirm the start of recording for their next album from April that same year. On March 19 they announce the arrival of new members. "We inform you of the incorporation into our project of the talented singer and pianist Francisca (Paquita) Rivera and the versatile Cristóbal Dahm in Saxo Baritone, Tenor and Clarinet", as well as the return of Rafael Chaparro to replace the newly retired Jaime Vázquez, and Christopher Schönffeldt on drums. With this new formation they present themselves at the Vang Festival in San Joaquín with the outstanding Brazilian composer Arrigo Barnabé. On November 22, 2014, they performed a concert, broadcast live, to mark the celebration of the band's 30th anniversary, that coincides with the 25th anniversary of the Radio Futuro, held at the Nescafé Theater of the Arts. With star guests, such as "pal bands" Santiago del Nuevo Extremo and MediaBanda, in addition to Pedro Foncea (from De Kiruza), Angelo Pierattini (from Weichafe), and the former drummer Guillermo Valenzuela. All of them reviewed a large part of the group's oeuvre, in addition to some new work they had been playing in recent times. Parallel to the celebration of the 30 years the documentary Fulano, animal in extinction premiered in the Féstival In-Edit Nescafé showing the group in this new creative stage.

=== Animal en extinción and break up (2015) ===
In 2015, after a tour through Chile that included cities such as Iquique, Valparaíso, Santiago, Talca, Concepción, Temuco, and Valdivia, the group focused on recording their expected new album, titled Animal en Extinción (Endangered animal), which finally was released in December 2015, its first studio album in 18 years, with Crisosto and Campos the only original members; with Paquita Rivera in voice, Rafael Chaparro and Cristobal Dahm in saxophones, Felipe Muñoz in keyboards and Álvaro Poblete in drums. The album opens with a tranquil theme by the deceased Jaime Vivanco, to then deploy a contestatory and non-conformist lyric, along with the characteristic music of great rhythmic, melodic and structural development. Simultaneously, a live album is released En La Batuta 1993 recorded in 1993 in Plaza Ñuñoa with the original line-up and with an unpublished Vivanco track entitled Alfa Ralfa Boulevard. However, after the release of the album, they announce the final dissolution of the band due to differences between Campos and Crisosto, bringing to an end 31 years of avant-garde musical history and cultural resistance.

=== Side projects, legacy and tribute (2016–2021) ===
A year to the day of the band's demise, the inheritance of Fulano came alive almost simultaneously through three different projects. Cristián Crisosto together with Chaparro and Dahm release the fourth Mediabanda album entitled Bombas en el Aire (Bombs in the air). Jorge Campos with Paquita, Muñoz, and Poblete create the band Animal en Extinción (Endangered animal) to disseminate part of Fulano's latest work as well as new compositions finally released in October 2018 in an album called Antes y después (before and after). Arlette Jequier with composer and guitarist Camilo Acevedo premiered Arlette Jequier y Grupo and announced a debut album that was finally released in January 2018 entitled Aire (Air). On the other hand, Congreso whose percussionist continues to be former Fulano Raúl Aliaga, released the album La canción que te debía in November 2017. In 2017 two other posthumous Fulano live albums were independently released, En vivo en Los Ángeles 2002 (Live in Los Angeles), and En directo FestivAlterNativo México 2010.

Since late 2018, Cristián Crisosto's Mediabanda is presenting the show "Mediabanda Plays Fulano", which premiered on November 16 at the Teatro Oriente in Providencia paying tribute to the music of the band, and in particular to Jaime Vivanco, with new arrangements of Tomás Ravassa on keyboards and Aurelio Silva on guitar, in a show and staging that exudes energy and attitude. In January 2020 they release the first single from their latest album entitled Maquinarias (Machinery) in tribute to Fulano, with the classic "Adolfo, Benito, Augusto y Toribio", at the Museum of Memory and Human Rights and in the context of the Social Outbreak. Finally, in 2021 the album Maquinarias was released, where the work carried out as a tribute with the participation of Pablo Ilabaca, Felipe Ilabaca, Cosuelo Schuster and Daniel Muñoz among others, is reflected.

== Discography ==
=== Studio albums ===
- 1987 – Fulano
- 1989 – En el Bunker (reissued in 1994 on CD)
- 1993 – El Infierno de los Payasos
- 1996 – Lo mejor (compilation album)
- 1997 – Trabajos Inútiles
- 2015 – Animal en Extinción

=== Live albums ===
- 2003 – Vivo
- 2011 – La Farsa Continúa (DVD)
- 2015 – En La Batuta 1993
- 2017 – En Los Ángeles de Chile 2002
- 2017 – En directo FestivAlterNativo México 2010

== Members ==
=== Originals ===
- Cristián Crisosto, composition, voice, soprano, alto, and baritone saxophones, flutes and bass clarinet (1984–2003, 2009–2015).
- Jorge Campos, composition, electric bass, (1984–2003, 2009–2015)
- Jaime Vivanco, composition, piano and keyboards. (1984–2003).
- Arlette Jequier, lead voice and clarinet (1984–2003, 2009–2012).
- Jaime Vasquez, voice, alto and tenor sax, and flute (1984–1999, 2009–2013).
- Guillermo Valenzuela, drums (1984–1996).

=== Others ===
- Raúl Aliaga, drums (1996–2003, 2009–2012).
- Rafael Chaparro, soprano and alto sax (1999–2003, 2013–2015).
- Felipe Muñoz, keyboards (2009–2015).
- Cristóbal Dahm, baritone and tenor saxophone, and clarinet (2013–2015).
- Christopher Schönffeldt, drums (2012–2014).
- Francisca Rivera, lead voice and keyboards (2013–2015).
- Álvaro Poblete, drums (2015).
- Cristóbal Rojas, drums (2014).
