= Lupita D'Alessio =

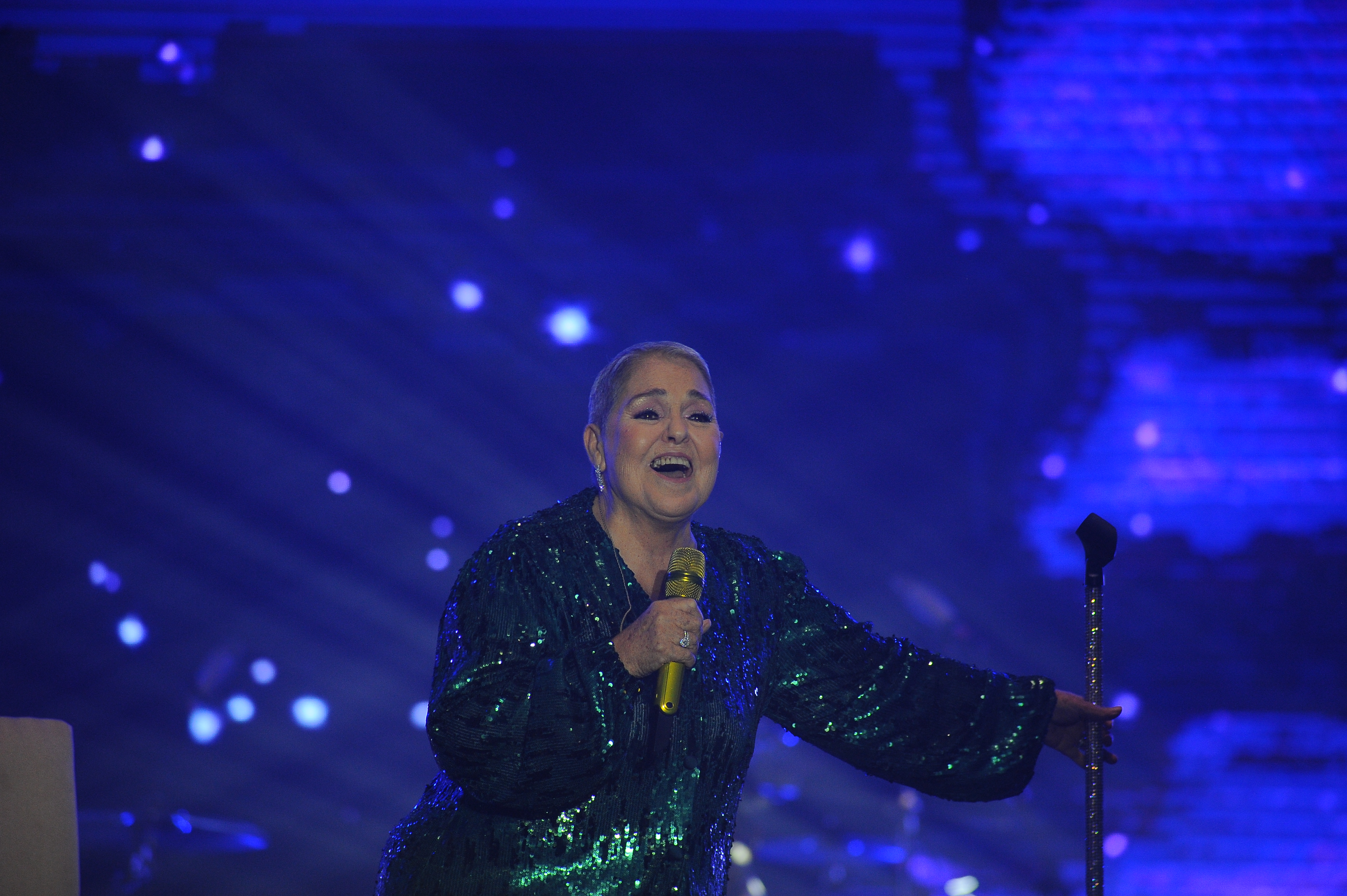

Background information
- Born: Guadalupe Contreras Ramos; 10 March 1954 (age 72)
- Origin: Tijuana, Baja California, Mexico
- Occupations: Singer; actress
- Instrument: Vocals
- Years active: 1971–present
- Label: EMI Music

Guadalupe Contreras Ramos (born 10 March 1954), better known as Lupita D'Alessio (Spanish pronunciation: [luˈpita ðaˈlesjo]), is a Mexican singer and actress. She is nicknamed "La Leona Dormida" (title of one of her signature songs, "The sleeping lioness").

== Biography ==
She started her career in showbusiness with her father Poncho D'Alessio, who had a musical show called La Familia D'Alessio on a Tijuana television station. She then moved to Mexico City and released a single "Mi Corazón es un Gitano", a cover of the Italian song "Il Cuore è Uno Zingaro" which won the Sanremo Music Festival, both in 1971. Then she was selected to perform the theme song of the telenovela of Televisa titled Mundo de juguete. She was invited to take roles on Ana del Aire and other productions in the 1970s and 1980s. Lupita sang the title song of telenovela Pacto de Amor, where she also acted.

In 1978, she won the Mexican national selection for the OTI Festival with the song "Como tú" and went to represent Mexico at the OTI Festival 1978 where she placed third. This fact helped her to consolidate her musical career in Mexico.

In 1980, Lupita was one of the main characters in Ernesto Alonso's Aprendiendo a Amar, where she played the role of her older daughter (the younger daughter was played by Erika Buenfil). The telenovela starred Susana Dosamantes (mother of Paulina Rubio). Lupita also sang the theme song "A Mí". She performed concerts on tour in Central and South America.

In 1986, Lupita starred in the movie Mentiras alongside Juan Ferrara, where she played Lupita Montero, an aspiring singer; she performed several songs for the soundtrack of the movie, including "Mudanzas". In 1987, she appeared in the short telenovela Tiempo De Amar, alongside Fernando Allende. Her last project of the 1980s was 1989's "Quién te crees tú", the theme to her last finished acting project, the telenovela Lo Blanco y lo Negro.

In 2000, she accepted a telenovela role in TV Azteca's Ellas, inocentes o culpables, although she left the production after a month. She returned to Televisa in 2002 for a guest appearance on the situation comedy La Jaula with Cesar Bono, Carlos Eduardo Rico, and Sheyla Tadeo.

For her work in television and as a recording artist, D'Alessio has her handprints and star embedded on the Paseo de las Luminarias in Mexico City.

In 2011, she participated as a critic in several episodes of Parodiando.

In 2018, she starred in her own biography on the miniseries Hoy voy a Cambiar, adding another number one hit together with the song Yo Sigo Aqui.

== Films ==
- Mentiras (1986) as Lupita Montero
- Siempre en Domingo (1983) as Lupita D'Alessio

== Telenovelas ==
- Ellas, inocentes o culpables (2000) as Amanda
- Lo blanco y lo negro (1989) as Verónica Montes
- Tiempo de amar (1987) as Carolina Montero
- Aprendiendo a amar (1980) as Jimena
- Pacto de amor (1977) as Julia
- Paloma (1975) as Dora Luz
- Ana del aire (1974) as Consuelo
- Cartas sin Destino (1973)

== Theater ==
- La novicia rebelde (The Sound of Music)

== Albums ==
Records from the 1970s to the 1980s with Orfeón, then with Columbia Records.

- Yo Sigo Aquí: Zona Preferente [En Vivo] (2017)
- Cuando se ama como tú (2013)
- La gira del adiós/En vivo (2007)
- El adiós (2006)
- Cuando el amor te besa (2004)
- Para Toda La Vida (2002)
- Estoy aquí (2000)
- Si yo pudiera detener el tiempo (1997)
- Desde mi libertad (1995)
- La D'Alessio (1993)
- Desde Mi Libertad (1994)
- La D'Alessio (1993)
- Tiempo De Amar (1981)
- Aprendiendo a Amar (1980)
- Gaviota del Aire
- Boleros De Siempre
- Soy Como Toda Mujer
- Lo Blanco y Lo Negro (1989)
- Juro Que Nunca Volveré
- Cuentos De Los Bosques De Viena
- Discothèque
- Lo mejor con la mejor
- Otra vez
- Que se detenga el tiempo

== See also ==
- Paquita la del Barrio
- List of best-selling Latin music artists
