= Ignacio Fernández Esperón =

Mexican composer (1894–1968)

- Born: 14 February 1894; Oaxaca, Mexico
- Died: 1968 (aged 73–74)
- Other names: Tata Nacho
- Occupation: Composer

Ignacio Fernández Esperón [aka Tata Nacho] (Oaxaca 14 February 1894 – 1968) was a Mexican composer. He grew up in Oaxaca in a middle-class home. His alias Tata Nacho was a childhood nickname. In 1937, he debuted his music on XEW, Mexico City's best known radio station. In 1947, he was given his own radio program Así es mi tierra. He composed over two hundred songs.

== Songs ==
- "Íntima". Text: Ricardo López Méndez (1903–1989)
