= Amparo Ochoa =

Mexican singer-songwriter

María Amparo Ochoa Castaños, (29 September 1946 in Culiacán, Sinaloa – 8 February 1994) better known as Amparo Ochoa, was a Mexican singer-songwriter. She was one of several other Mexican artists who emerged in the 1960s belonging to the movement known as Nueva canción.

Ochoa was born in 1946 in the Mexican state of Sinaloa. Before becoming involved in music, Ochoa served as an elementary school teacher. She became heavily involved in songwriting beginning in 1962, and her career took off when she won a contest in her native state with the song Hermosísimo Lucero.

In 1969, she moved to Mexico City to attend the National Music School, a department of the UNAM. Shortly after, she released her first album De la mano del viento.

Ochoa is best known for writing songs with strong messages against social injustice as well songs about Mexican history and culture. Most of her lyrics focus on poverty, indigenous rights, and women's rights.

Amparo Ochoa visited Nicaragua as a distinguished personality who participated in the country's revolution anniversary in 1983. She performed along with Gabino Palomares Maldición de Malinche, a popular and touching song; its lyrics criticize the cultural proneness of many Latin Americans to revere white Europeans while despising indigenous people, an attitude inherited from the times of the Spanish conquest.

Amparo Ochoa died at the age of 48 of stomach cancer.
