= Santiago del Nuevo Extremo (band) =

Chilean band

- Origin: Santiago, Chile
- Genres: Fusión latinoamericana, Nueva Canción Chilena,
- Years active: 1978-present
- Label: Sello Alerce
- Members: Luis Le-Bert; Pedro Villagra; Carlos Basilio; Juan Caballero
- Past members: Jorge Campos; Raúl Sáez; Luis Pérez; Nicolás Eyzaguirre; Cristián Crisosto; Willy Valenzuela; Sergio González Morales; Jaime Vivanco

Santiago del Nuevo Extremo is a Chilean band formed in 1978 at Santiago, Chile. It was one of the most important bands of the Canto Nuevo music movement during Pinochet’s dictatorship. The band was named after the original name of Santiago de Chile when it was founded by Pedro de Valdivia in 1541.

It has shared a stage in multiple occasions with Inti-Illimani, and some of its members would go on to found the jazz-rock band Fulano.

== Discography ==
=== Studio albums ===
- 1981 - A mi ciudad
- 1983 - Hasta encontrarnos
- 1985 - Barricadas
- 2000 - Salvo tú y yo
- 2011 - Leuda
- 2016 - Santiago del Nuevo Extremo

=== Live albums ===
- 2001 - Santiago del Nuevo Extremo en vivo

=== Compilation albums ===
- 1998 - Lo mejor de Santiago del Nuevo Extremo, vol 1
- 2001 - Lo mejor de Santiago del Nuevo Extremo, vol 2
