= Óscar Chávez =

Mexican singer (1935–2020)

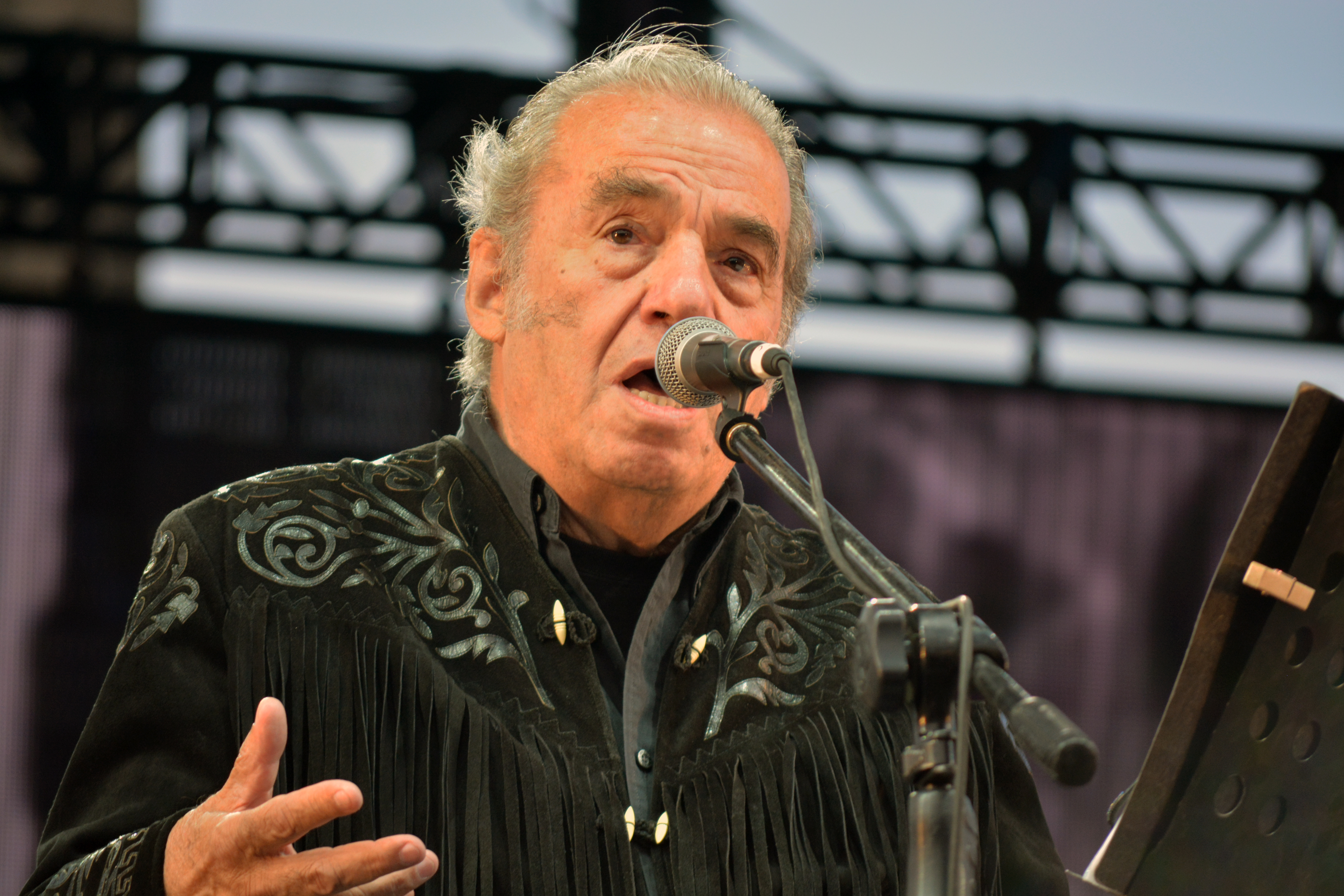

Background information
- Born: Óscar Chávez Fernández; 20 March 1935; Col. Portales, Mexico City
- Died: 30 April 2020 (aged 85) Mexico City

Óscar Chávez (20 March 1935 – 30 April 2020) was a Mexican singer, songwriter and actor. He was the major proponent of the Nueva Trova movement in Mexico in the 1960s and 1970s.

== Career and education ==
Chávez studied theatre at the National Autonomous University of Mexico (UNAM) and went on to produce and act in several plays, movies and telenovelas in Mexico. He achieved international fame through his music. His songs "Por Ti" and "Macondo" are particularly well-known in Latin America. In addition, Chávez recorded many Mexican folk songs.

Chávez was noted for his strong commitment to social causes and the left-wing ideas expressed in his lyrics. His discography spanned four decades.

== Death ==
Chávez died on 30 April 2020 from COVID-19 during the COVID-19 pandemic in Mexico. He was 85.
