= Lollapalooza Chile =

Chilean music festival

- Genre: Alternative rock, heavy metal, hip hop, electronic, punk rock, pop
- Frequency: Annually
- Locations: O'Higgins Park, Santiago, Chile (1970–2011; 2026-present); Bicentennial Park, Cerillos, Chile (2022–2025)
- Years active: 14
- Inaugurated: April 2, 2011; 15 years ago
- Most recent: 20-22 March 2026
- Website: lollapaloozacl.com

Lollapalooza Chile is the Chilean edition of the popular music festival Lollapalooza (/ˌlɒləpəˈluːzə/). It was the first Lollapalooza event to be held outside the United States and has taken place in Santiago, Chile since 2011.

== History ==
The festival debuted in April 2011 at Santiago’s O'Higgins Park, featuring alternative rock, heavy metal, punk rock, and hip-hop artists from both Chile and abroad. Following its success, Lollapalooza Brazil was launched in São Paulo in 2012.

Lollapalooza Chile is managed by the Chilean production company Lotus Productions in partnership with Lollapalooza founder and Jane's Addiction frontman Perry Farrell. The event attracted approximately 100,000 attendees in its first edition and grew to 115,000 in 2012.

No Lollapalooza was held in 2020-21.

Its attendance record was set in 2022, when 225,000 people attended the event as it was held at Cerrillos' Parque Bicentenario for the first time.

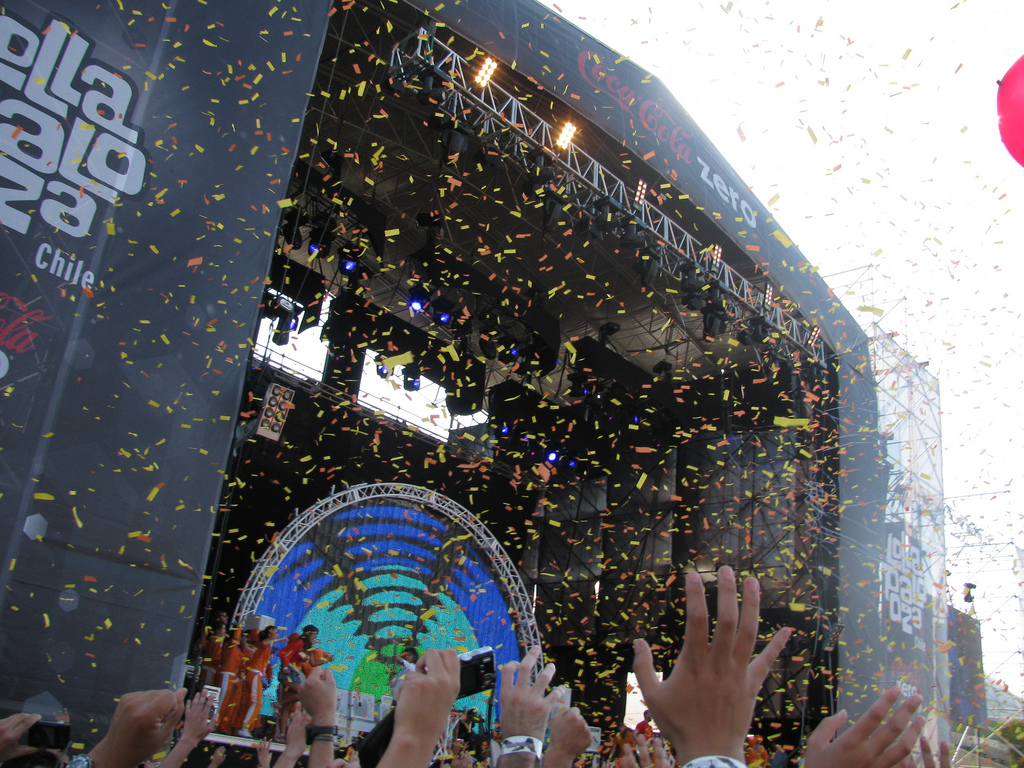
The Flaming Lips on stage at Lollapalooza Chile 2011

== Acts ==
Lollapalooza Chile has featured a wide range of international artists, including The Killers, Jane's Addiction, Kanye West, Kendrick Lamar, Björk, Lana del Rey, Deftones, Fatboy Slim, Thirty Seconds to Mars, The Flaming Lips, Arctic Monkeys, Foo Fighters, MGMT, Tinie Tempah, Sublime with Rome, Foster the People, Calvin Harris and Armin Van Buuren. The 2013 lineup included The Black Keys, Pearl Jam, Queens of the Stone Age, Keane, Deadmau5, A Perfect Circle, Franz Ferdinand, The Hives, and many others.

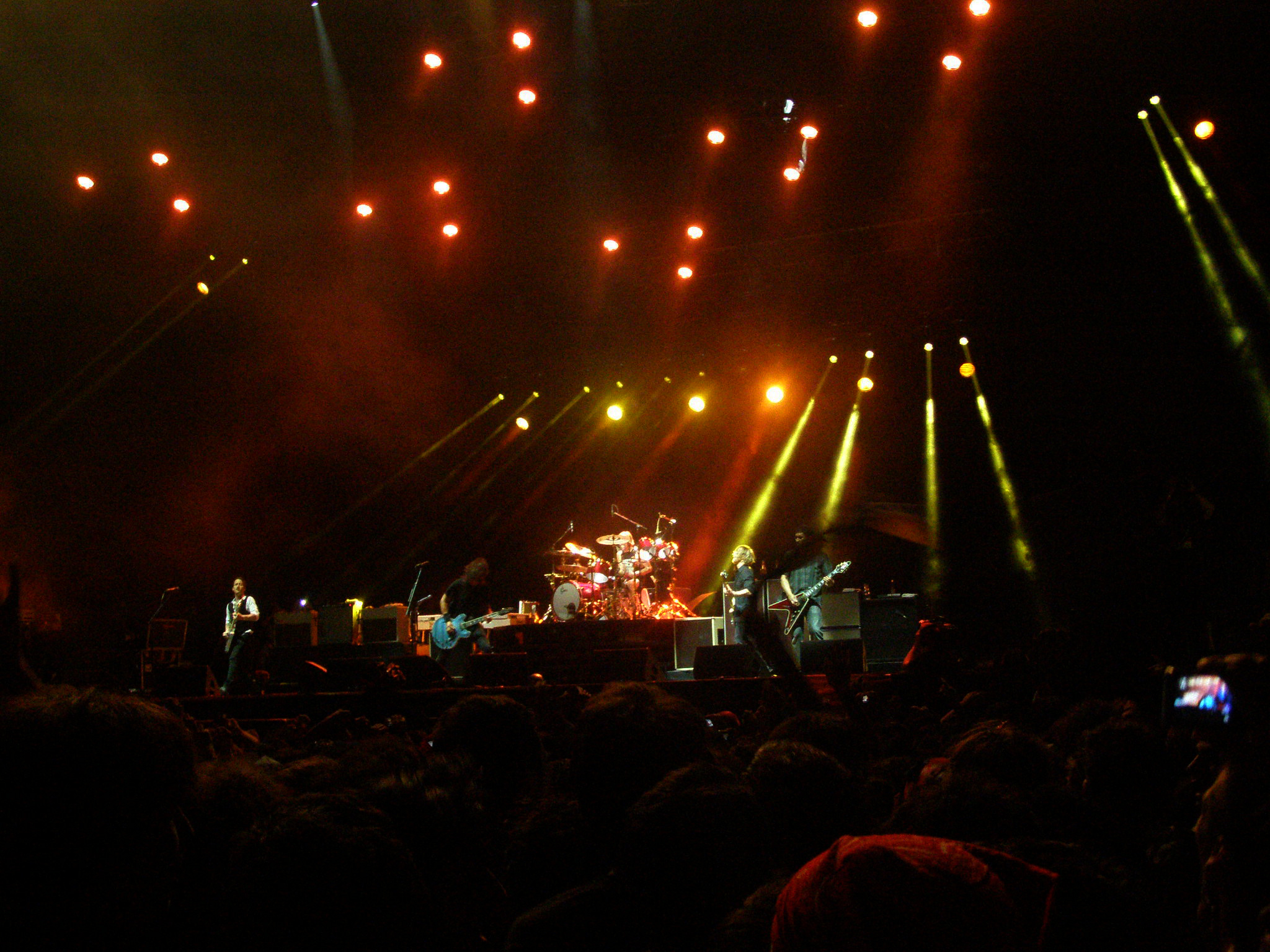
Foo Fighters at Lollapalooza Chile 2012

Moreover, the festival has also provided a significant platform for Chilean music, with performances by local artists drawing some of its largest crowds. Notable Chileans acts have included Mon Laferte, Los Tres, Chico Trujillo, Anita Tijoux, Alex Anwandter, Los Jaivas, Los Bunkers, Javiera Mena, Francisca Valenzuela, Joe Vasconcellos, and Gepe.

Lollapalooza Chile has also served as a springboard for Chilean artists such as Los Bunkers, Chico Trujillo, and Ana Tijoux, allowing them to perform at the original Lollapalooza festival in Chicago.

== Lineups by year ==
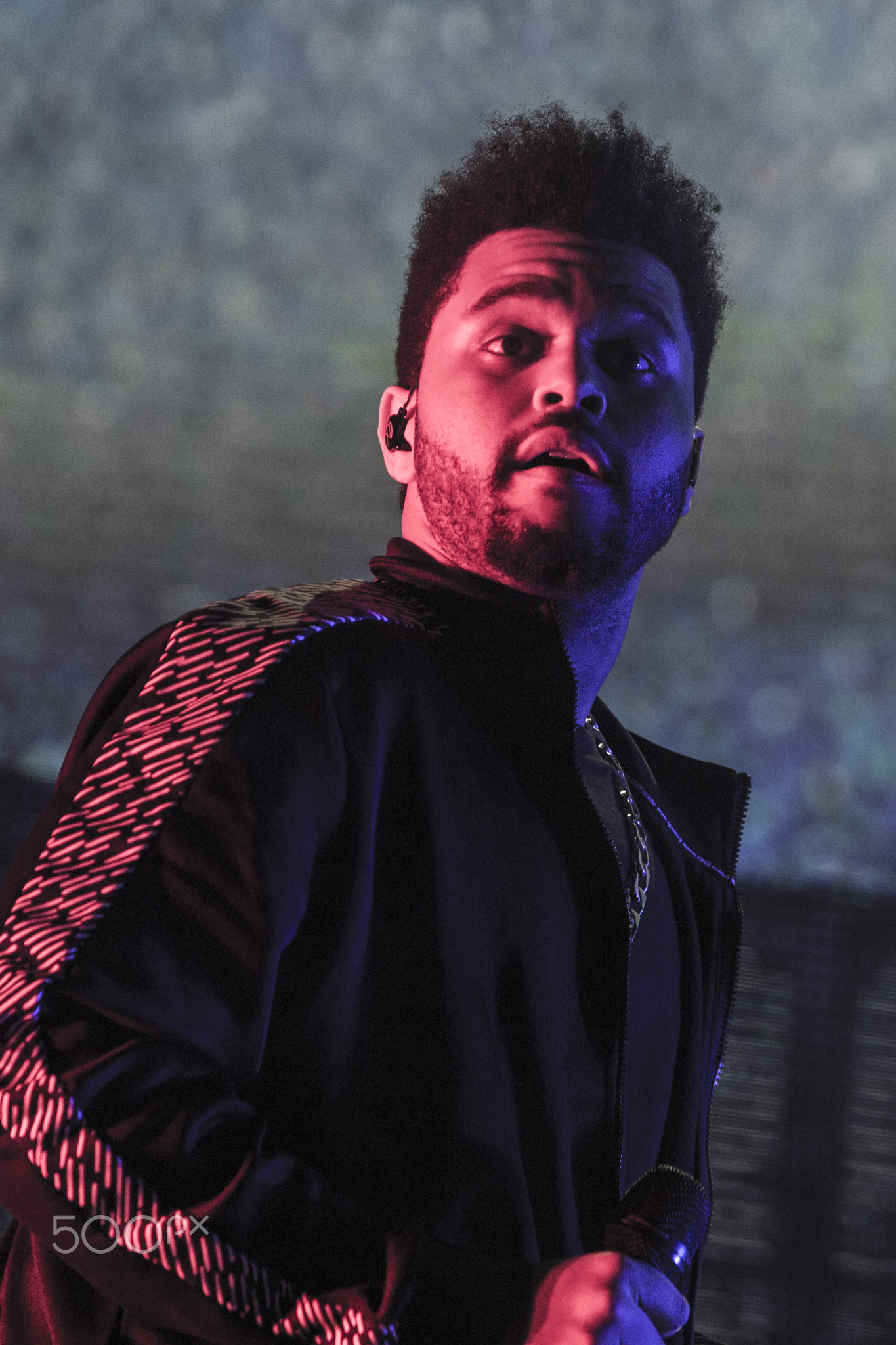
The Weeknd at Lollapalooza Chile 2017

=== 2011 ===
In November 2010, Perry Farrell announced that the twentieth edition of the Lollapalooza festival would be held outside the United States for the first time. The chosen venue was Parque O'Higgins in Santiago, Chile on April 2 and 3, 2011.

The event featured 54 artists from Chile, United States, Brazil, Argentina, and France attracting approximately 100,000 attendees across the O'Higgins Park Ellipse, the Movistar Arena, and the Theater Dome.

Saturday, 2 April
Coca-Cola Zero Stage	Claro Stage	LG Stage	Tech Stage	Kidzapalooza
The Killers	Deftones	Fatboy Slim	Cansei de Ser Sexy	Achu
The National	Ben Harper	Empire of the Sun	Datarock	Los Pulentos
James	Cypress Hill	Perry Etty v/s Chris Cox	Edward Sharpe	Magic Twins
Los Bunkers	Steel Pulse	Joachim Garraud	Bomba Estéreo	
	Francisca Valenzuela	Zeta Bosio	Ana Tijoux	
		Latin Bitman	Dënver	
		DJ Raff	Astro	
		New Kids on the Noise	Devil Presley	
		Ital		

Sunday, 3 April
Coca-Cola Zero Stage	Claro Stage	LG Stage	Tech Stage	Kidzapalooza
Kanye West	Jane's Addiction	Armin Van Buuren	Cold War Kids	Los Pulentos
Thirty Seconds to Mars	Sublime with Rome	Boys Noize	The Drums	Achu & Los Plumabits
The Flaming Lips	Chico Trujillo	Fischerspooner	Cat Power	Fractal & Joe Vasconcellos
311	Todos tus muertos	Ghostland Observatory	Devendra Banhart	Cuchara
Mala Rodríguez	Quique Neira	Toy Selektah	Fother Muckers	
		Javiera Mena	The Ganjas	
		Matanza	Cómo Asesinar a Felipes	
			Mundano	

=== 2012 ===
The lineup was very poorly received by many festival fans when it was first released, as there were only a few big-name artists such as Björk, MGMT, Joan Jett and Foo Fighters, but by the time the festival finally started many popular artists such as Arctic Monkeys Calvin Harris, Skrillex, Tinie Tempah and Foster the People, among others joined the lineup. This new version of the Festival showed various improvements, such as security, a wider selection of food posts, better information regarding the festival itself and a better atmosphere.

Saturday, 31 March
Claro-LG Stage	Coca-Cola Stage	Alternative Stage	Perry's Stage	Huntcha Stage	Kidzapalooza
Björk	Arctic Monkeys	Crosses	Calvin Harris	Silvestre	31 Minutos
Cage the Elephant	Los Jaivas	Electrodomésticos	Bassnectar	Föllakzoid	MC Billeta
Thievery Corporation	Gogol Bordello	Los Tetas	Pretty Lights	La Mala Senda	Inti Illimani Historico
Gentleman	Gustavo Cordera	HopPo!	Surtek Collective	Pulenta	Mosquitas Muertas
Pedro Piedra		Plebe Rude	Ritmo Machine	Beat Calavera	
		Adanowsky	Adrianigual	Dion	
			El Sueño de la casa propia		

Sunday, 1 April
Claro-LG Stage	Coca-Cola Stage	Alternative Stage	Perry's Stage	Huntcha Stage	Kidzapalooza
Foo Fighters	MGMT	Peaches	Above & Beyond	Jiminelson	31 Minutos
Joan Jett & the Blackhearts	TV on the Radio	Illya Kuryaki and the Valderramas	Skrillex	Fernando Milagros	Mazapán
Band of Horses	Friendly Fires	Morodo	Tinie Tempah	We are The Grand	Anitchie
Foster the People	Camila Moreno	Systema Solar	The Crystal Method	Gush	Newen Afrobeat
Bbs Paranoicos		Juana Fe	Perry Etty vs Chris Cox	Yael Meyer	
			Álex Anwandter	Soul & Senses	
			Mawashi		

=== 2013 ===
The lineup for the festival was well received by the audience as it brought many artists considered to be of high quality such as Pearl Jam, Keane, Franz Ferdinand, Queens of the Stone Age, The Black Keys, The Hives, Kaiser Chiefs, deadmau5, Passion Pit, Two Door Cinema Club, Of Monsters and Men, A Perfect Circle, Hot Chip and Foals, and many others.

On January 28, 2013, Lotus released the schedules of each artist on Facebook, with the participation of fans through "likes", which served to open the "curtain" with the schedules of each stage on their website.

Saturday, 6 April
Claro-LG Stage	Coca-Cola Stage	Alternative Stage	LG-Optimus Stage	Lotus Stage	Kidzapalooza
Pearl Jam	Queens of the Stone Age	Puscifer	Kaskade	Zonora Point	Cachureos
The Hives	Kaiser Chiefs	Passion Pit	Major Lazer	Intimate Stranger	Sinergia
Two Door Cinema Club	Of Monsters and Men	The Temper Trap	Zeds Dead	Keko Yoma	Chevy Metal
Los Tres	Chancho en Piedra	Alabama Shakes	Crystal Castles	Pascuala y Fauna	Los Plumabits
Gepe	Banda Conmocion	Dread Mar I	DJ Marky	Treboles	
		Carla Morrison	Mecanico		

Sunday, 7 April
Claro-LG Stage	Coca-Cola Stage	Alternative Stage	LG-Optimus Stage	Lotus Stage	Kidzpalooza
The Black Keys	Deadmau5	Hot Chip	Steve Aoki	Kali Mutsa	Cachureos
A Perfect Circle	Franz Ferdinand	Bad Brains	Nas	Protistas	Mago Oli
Tomahawk	Keane	Foals	Porter Robinson	Resina Lala	Transbuhiriano
Gary Clark Jr.	Manuel Garcia	Marcelo D2	Poncho	Red Oblivion	
Perrosky	De Saloon	Toro y Moi	Daniel Klauser	Agents	
		Russian Red			

=== 2014 ===
Lollapalooza Chile 2014 was the fourth edition of the popular festival in the country. It was held in the O'Higgins Park in Santiago on 29th and 30 March of that year. The final attending number of spectators estimated by Lotus Productions was around 160,000 people, about 80,000 in total.

"In pursuit of the ultimate band of Kidzapalooza", sponsored by Lotus Productions and Coca-Cola Chile, the competition was intended to encourage the participation of young people across Chile between the ages of 14 and 18 years old encouraging them to participate with their own band for the grand prize to appear in the official scenario of Kidzapalooza during the 2014 Lollapalooza Chile Festival. To participate, each band had to send a home video (uncut) of 90 seconds, where all members appeared playing and/or singing. This video had to be sent, together with information of the band, between October 24 and December 22, 2013. The winning band was Mangoré.

Saturday, 29 March
Coca-Cola Stage	Claro Stage	PlayStation Stage	LG G2 Stage	Paris Stage	Kidzpalooza
Nine Inch Nails	Red Hot Chili Peppers	The Wailers	Zedd	Onda Vaga	31 Minutos
Ellie Goulding	Phoenix	Francisca Valenzuela	The Bloody Beetroots	Upa!	Orixangó
Cage The Elephant	Imagine Dragons	AFI	Wolfgang Gartner	Nação Zumbi	Cantando Aprendo A Hablar
Lucybell	Cafe Tacuba	Jake Bugg	Baauer	Dr. Vena	
Movimiento Original	Joe Vasconcellos	Capital Cities	Flume	Hortadoj	
		Nano Stern	Lance Herbstrong	Prefiero Fernández	
		Santobando	Fat Pablo		

Sunday, 30 March
Coca-Cola Stage	Claro Stage	PlayStation Stage	LG G2 Stage	Paris Stage	Kidzpalaooza
Arcade Fire	Soundgarden	New Order	Axwell	Nicole	31 Minutos
Vampire Weekend	Pixies	Jovanotti	Kid Cudi	Monsieur Periné	Power Peralta
Johnny Marr	Julian Casablancas	Lorde	Krewella	Niño Cohete	Natalia Contesse
Ana Tijoux	Portugal. The Man	Savages	Flux Pavilion	Somos Manhattan	Tikitiklip
We Are The Grand	HopPo!	Inti-Illimani	PerryEtty vs Joachim Garraud	Mistah Dijah	
		Natalia Lafourcade	Sanfuentes	Rama	
		Red Oblivion	Alejandro Vivanco		

=== 2015 ===
The line up was released on November 16, 2014. Jorge Gonzalez, ex leader of a Chilean 80's rock band known as Los Prisioneros cancelled his presentation after suffering a stroke on February 8, 2015. On March 2, it was confirmed that his replacement would be Ana Tijoux.

Saturday, 14 March
VTR Stage	Coca-Cola Stage	Acer Stage	D-Box VTR Stage	Lotus Stage	Kidzapalooza
Jack White	Skrillex	Ana Tijoux	Nicky Romero	Javiera y Los Imposibles	Donavon Frankenreiter
The Smashing Pumpkins	Foster The People	St. Vincent	Ritmo Machine /w Sen Dog & Sick Jacken	Chinoy	The Helmets
The Kooks	Molotov	Chancho en Piedra & Los Tetas	Dillon Francis	Esteman	3x7 Veintiuna
Donavon Frankenreiter	Congreso	Camila Moreno	Carnage	Hielo Negro	La Ciscu Margaret
Fernando Milagros	López	Zaturno	Kill the Noise	Manu Da Banda	
		Maxi Trusso	Matanza	Oh Margot!	
		Abya Yala	MKRNI	Marineros	
			DJ Caso		

Sunday, 15 March
VTR Stage	Coca-Cola Stage	Acer Stage	D-Box VTR Stage	Lotus Stage	Kidzapalooza
Kings of Leon	Calvin Harris	Interpol	Major Lazer	Yajaira	Heavysaurios
Robert Plant	Kasabian	SBTRKT	Cypress Hill	Miss Garrison	Los Plumabits
Bastille	Alt-J	Damian Marley	DJ Snake	María Magdalena	Mosquitas Muertas
The Specials	Lumumba	Chet Faker	RVSB	Lilits	Las Aventuras del Barco Volador
Astro	Pedro Piedra	The Last Internationale	Rudimental	Dead Christine	
Quique Neira		Mass Mental	Atom™	Fármacos	
		Portavoz	Afrik		
		Kapitol			

=== 2016 ===
The sixth edition of Lollapalooza Chile was held on 19–20 March 2016. The official 2016 lineup was released on October 6, 2015, and their headliner were; Eminem, Florence + The Machine, Jack Ü, Mumford and Sons.

Saturday, 19 March
VTR Stage	Itaú Stage	Acer Windows 10 Stage	Perry's Stage By VTR	Lotus Stage	Kidzapalooza
Eminem	Jack Ü	Gepe	Zedd	Föllakzoid	Cachureos
Tame Impala	Of Monsters and Men	Halsey	Todos Tus Muertos	Kuervos del Sur	Magia Real
Jungle	Albert Hammond Jr.	Walk the Moon	Duke Dumont	Magaly Fields	School of Rock
Eagles of Death Metal	Javiera Mena	Candlebox	Flosstradamus	Telebit	Despertando Las Neuronas
Movimiento Original	Ases Falsos	The Joy Formidable	Bitman and Roban	Suicide Bitches	
		Jiminelson	Jack Novak	Julius Poper	
			Dj Who		

Sunday, 20 March
VTR Stage	Itaú Stage	Acer Windows 10 Stage	Perry's Stage By VTR	Lotus Stage	Kidzapalooza
Florence + The Machine	Mumford & Sons	Die Antwoord	Kaskade	Aguaturbia	Mike Tompkins
Alabama Shakes	Brandon Flowers	Ghost	Zeds Dead	Oddó	Florcita Motuda
Twenty One Pilots	Bad Religion	Marina And The Diamonds	RL Grime	La Guacha	Haumoana
Vintage Trouble	Babasónicos	Odesza	A-Trak	Stone Giant	Cantando Aprendo a Hablar
	Tinariwen	Seeed	Gramatik	Planeta No	
		Tiano Bless	Matthew Koma		
			Tunacola		

=== 2017 ===
The seventh edition of Lollapalooza Chile was held on 1–2 April 2017. The official 2017 lineup was released on September 28, 2017, headliners will be; Metallica, The Strokes, The Weeknd and The XX. It was the edition with most attendance in the history of Lollapalooza Chile with 85.000 peoples per day. A few days before the festival, was officially revealed a new stage called "Aldea Verde Stage" who is in the Green Spirit Area.

Saturday, 1 April
VTR Stage	Itaú Stage	Acer Windows 10 Stage	Perry's Stage By VTR	Lotus Stage	Kidzapalooza	Aldea Verde Stage
Metallica	The XX	G-Eazy	Diplo	López	The Helmets	Beatriz Pichi Malen
Rancid	The 1975	Tove Lo	Marshmello	Crisalida	Sophi Lira	Javier & Angel Parra
Cage The Elephant	Glass Animals	Bomba Estéreo	Tchami	Dr. Vena	Secret Show	Amahiro
Lucybell	Weichafe	Silversun Pickups	Don Diablo	Paz Court y la Orquesta Florida	De Tu Cuna A Tu Tumba	Meli Moyu
La Pozze Latina	Villa Cariño	Newen Afrobeat	DJ Who?	8 Monkys		
		Prehistöricos	Alok	Me Llamo Sebastián		
			Román y Castro			

Sunday, 2 April
VTR Stage	Itaú Stage	Acer Windows 10 Stage	Perry's Stage By VTR	Lotus Stage	Kidzapalooza	Aldea Verde Stage
The Strokes	The Weeknd	Flume	Martin Garrix	Mad Professor	Mazapán & Nerven&Zellen	Natalia Contesse
Two Door Cinema Club	Duran Duran	Melanie Martinez	Oliver Heldens	Zaturno & Mc Piri	El Barco Volador	Subhira
Jimmy Eat World	Catfish and the Bottlemen	MØ	Nervo	Boraj	Secret Show	Voces del Desierto
Álex Anwandter	Gondwana	Vance Joy	GRiZ	Temple Agents	Piececitos	Shaiva Tabdar
We Are The Grand	Liricistas	Tegan and Sara	Borgore	Amahiro		
		Chicago Toys	Vives & Forero	Enrique Icka		
			Rod Valdés	Mariel Mariel		
				Tus Amigos Nuevos		

=== 2018 ===
The eighth edition of Lollapalooza Chile was held on 16–18 March 2018. It was the first time that the festival was realized in three days. Also, Lollapalooza made an expansion of the park giving to the fans new zones for walk. This version received more than 80,000 attendees per day. This edition was one of the most criticized due to the logistical problems that the festival had due to the electric storms that affected Buenos Aires, Argentina (most of the bands were playing at Lollapalooza Argentina in the same weekend), that affected the arrival of several artists on Saturday and Sunday, even having to cancel some shows and move others. Days before the festival begins, it was announced that Tyler, the Creator would not be able to play at the festival, in his replacement Aurora was confirmed.

Friday, 16 March
VTR Stage	Itaú Stage	Acer Windows 10 Stage	Perry's Stage By VTR	Lotus Stage	Kidzapalooza	Aldea Verde Stage
Pearl Jam	LCD Soundsystem	Kygo	Galantis	De Kiruza	31 Minutos	Alex June
The National	David Byrne	Aurora	Dillon Francis	Sinergia	Olhaberry	Tumu Tapu
Milky Chance	Los Jaivas	Volbeat	Alan Walker	Maxi Vargas	The Alive	Hausi Kuta
Ego Kill Talent	Zoé	Bajofondo	Cheat Codes	The Ganjas	Liberando Talento	
Pedro Piedra	Como Asesinar a Felipes	Lanza Internacional	Thomas Jack	Cordillera		
		Spiral Vortex	Shoot the Radio	Fuglar		
			Jordan Ferrer			
			Hedo			

Saturday, 17 March
VTR Stage	Itaú Stage	Acer Windows 10 Stage	Perry's Stage By VTR	Lotus Stage	Kidzapalooza	Aldea Verde Stage
Red Hot Chili Peppers	Imagine Dragons	Camila Cabello	Hardwell	Vicente Sanfuentes	31 Minutos	El Buho
Chance the Rapper	Anderson Paak	Zara Larsson	DVBBS	Latin Bitman	Deep Roy	Matanza
Mon Laferte	Las Pelotas	Royal Blood	Alison Wonderland	Movimiento Original	Los Frutantes	DJ Nea
Chancho en Piedra	Santa Feria	Oh Wonder	What So Not	Amilkar	School of Rock	Colores Musicales
Alain Johannes		Fernando Milagros	Shiba San	MKRNI		
		Ceaese	Mitú	TenTemPiés		
			DJ Caso			
			Rubio			

Sunday, 18 March
VTR Stage	Itaú Stage	Acer Windows 10 Stage	Perry's Stage By VTR	Lotus Stage	Kidzapalooza	Aldea Verde Stage
The Killers	Lana Del Rey	Wiz Khalifa	DJ Snake	Matanza	Laguna y el Río	Zsanchos
Liam Gallagher	Khalid	The Neighbourhood	Yellow Claw	El Buho	Los Fi	Roman & Castro
Metronomy	Mac DeMarco	Spoon	Deorro	Quique Neira	Aventuras del Barco Volador	Spiral Vortex
Tash Sultana	Damas Gratis	Kaleo	NGHTMRE	Tiano Bless		MKRNI
Moral Distraída	Kuervos del Sur	Mac Miller	Louis the Child	Boom Boom Kid		
		Camileazy	Whethan	Ribo		
			DJ Mel	Solución Violeta		

=== 2019 ===
The ninth edition of Lollapalooza Chile was held on March 29-31, 2019. In 2019, Lollapalooza Chile featured more than 120 artists on eight stages, three more than the Argentinian and Brazilian editions. The headliners of the 2019 lineup included Kendrick Lamar, Arctic Monkeys, Twenty One Pilots, Lenny Kravitz, Post Malone, Sam Smith and Tiesto. The lineup also include names like The 1975, Dimitri Vegas & Like Mike, Macklemore, Steve Aoki, Portugal. the Man, Interpol, Odesza, Years & Years, Snow Patrol, Bring Me the Horizon, Greta Van Fleet, Ziggy Marley and many others.

Friday, 29 March
VTR Stage	Banco de Chile Stage	Acer Stage	Perry's Stage By VTR	Lotus Stage	Kidzapalooza	Aldea Verde Stage Stage by Engie	Heineken Lounge Stage
Kendrick Lamar	Lenny Kravitz	Paulo Londra	Dimitri Vegas & Like Mike	Tokyo Ska Paradise Orchestra	Los Pulentos	Satori	Fernanda Arrau
Greta Van Fleet	Vicentico	Jorja Smith	KSHMR	Caetano, Moreno, Zeta & Veloso	Angel Parra y los Retornados	Nicola Cruz	Melanie Ribbe
Snow Patrol	Los Tres	Clairo	FISHER	Green Valley	Subhira	DJ Raff	Red Rabbit
Francisca Valenzuela	LANY	Bronko Yotte	Kungs	Amanitas	Los Frutantes	Chancha Via Circuito	DJ Tressor
The Inspector Cluzo	Frank's White Canvas	Playa Gótica	Gryffin	Drefquila		Elkin Robinson	Compadre
			Kevinho			Kaleema	Drunvaloop
			Kidd Keo			Tribu Huni Kuin	
			Sistek				

Saturday, 30 March
VTR Stage	Banco de Chile Stage	Acer Stage	Perry's Stage By VTR	Lotus Stage	Kidzapalooza	Aldea Verde Stage Stage by Engie	Heineken Lounge Stage
Twenty One Pilots	Post Malone	Odeza	Steve Aoki	Américo	Los Pulentos	Valesuchi	DJ Raff
Interpol	Years & Years	Rüfüs Du Sol	RL Grime	Paloma Mami	Monsieur Periné	Booka Shade	Satori
Bring Me the Horizon	Portugal. The Man	Protoje & the Indiggnation	DJ Who?	Alemán	Foji	Nova Materia	Entrópica
Ziggy Marley	Kamasi Washington	Fever 333	Valentino Khan	Tomasa Del Real	Danzantes	Rubio	Pol del Sur
Monsieur Periné	Zaturno & Zole	Ases Falsos	Hippie Sabotage	Gianluca		A. Chal	Isa Rojas
		Pillanes	JetLag			Julio Victoria	GoldenRat
		Humboldt	Bad Gyal			Kingoroots & Ras Kadhu	
			Flak				

Sunday, 31 March
VTR Stage	Banco de Chile Stage	Acer Stage	Perry's Stage By VTR	Lotus Stage	Kidzapalooza	Aldea Verde Stage Stage by Engie	Heineken Lounge Stage
Arctic Monkeys	Sam Smith	Macklemore	Tiësto	La Floripondio	Sinergia Kids Game	Batalla de Gallos	Valesuchi
The 1975	Foals	St. Vincent	Zhu	Joe Vasconcellos	Sophi Lira	Seun Kuti	Fantasna
Juanes	Troye Sivan	Rosalía	Don Diablo	C. Tangana		Newen Afrobeat	Sita Abellán
Gepe	La Vela Puerca	Jain	Loud Luxury	Alika		Keko Yoma	Marcela Thais
Fiskales Ad-Hok	Adelaida	Parcels	GTA	iLe		Natalia Contesse	Jefe Indio
		Caramelos de Cianuro	Khea				
		Cigarbox Man	Omar Varela				
			Polimá Westcoast				

=== 2022 ===
The tenth edition of Lollapalooza Chile was held on 18–20 March 2022.

=== 2023 ===
Friday, March 17
Costanera Center Stage	Banco de Chile Stage	Axe Stage	Perry's Stage by Costanera Center	Kidzapalooza Stage	Aldea Verde Stage
Billie Eilish	Lil Nas X	Rise Against	Claptone	Mi Perro Chocolo	Vicente Cifuentes
Kali Uchis	Conan Gray	Polo & Pan	Gorgon City	Tikitiklip	Angelo Pierattini
Mother Mother	Mora	Modest Mouse	Tokischa	El Barco Volador	Francisco El Hombre
Usted Señalemelo	Conociendo Rusia	Hot Milk	Ryan Castro	Hola Flinko	Tom D. Rocka
Pailita	Elsa y Elmar	FrioLento	Nora En Pure		El Cruce
Sofía Gabanna		Chini.png	Rojuu		
			Dillom		
			Shirel		
			Loyaltty		

Saturday, March 18
Costanera Center Stage	Banco de Chile Stage	Axe Stage	Perry's Stage by Costanera Center	Kidzapalooza Stage	Aldea Verde Stage
Drake	Rosalía	Cigarettes After Sex	Armin van Buuren	Sinergia Kids	Ases Falsos
Tove Lo	AURORA	The Rose	Alison Wonderland	Nano Stern	Benjamín Walker
Pettinellis	Danny Ocean	Suki Waterhouse	John Summit	Go, Go Gallo Pipe	Yael Meyer
Young Cister	Louta	Marilina Bertoldi	Cris MJ	School of Rock	Clemente
El Kuelgue	Villano Antillano	Benito Cerati	Young Miko		Código Abierto
Stailok		Masquemusica	Madds		
			Melanie Ribbe		
			Red Bull Batalla		
			Baus		

Sunday, March 19
Costanera Center Stage	Banco de Chile Stage	Axe Stage	Perry's Stage by Costanera Center	Kidzapalooza Stage	Aldea Verde Stage
Twenty One Pilots	Tame Impala	Melanie Martinez	Jamie xx	Mi Perro Chocolo	Alain Johannes Trío
The 1975	Jane's Addiction	Lit Killah	Purple Disco Machine	Tikitiklip	Gufi
Wallows	Yungblud	Sofi Tukker	Fred Again.	Caleuchístico	Malamen
Álex Anwandter	Ottto	Pánico	Álvaro Díaz	Lyra	Alectrofobia
Spiral Vortex		Nano Stern	YSY A		Samsara
		Plumas	DT.Bilardo		
			King Savagge		
			Pablito Pesadilla		
			RVYO		

=== 2024 ===
The 12th edition of Lollapalooza Chile was held on 15–17 March, 2024. The headliners for the festival were Blink-182, Feid, SZA, Sam Smith, Arcade Fire, Limp Bizkit, Hozier, and The Offspring.

=== 2025 ===
The 13th edition of Lollapalooza Chile was held on 21–23 March 2025. The headliners for the festival were Olivia Rodrigo, Rüfüs Du Sol, Justin Timberlake, Alanis Morissette, Tool, and Shawn Mendes. Other big artists that performed but were not headliners included Benson Boone, Girl in Red, Tate McRae, Hesse Kassel, and Teddy Swims.

== See also ==
- List of historic rock festivals
