= Ser humano!! =

Studio album by Tiro de Gracia
- Released: August 1997
- Recorded: May 1996 – June 1997
- Studio: Konstantinopla Studios
- Genres: Latin rap; hip hop; alternative hip hop
- Length: 53:12
- Label: EMI Odeon
- Producers: Camilo Cintolesi; Patricio Loaiza

Tiro de Gracia chronology
Ser humano!! (1997)	Decisión (1999)

Singles from Ser Humano!!
- 1. "El Juego Verdadero" Released: 1997; 2. "Viaje sin Rumbo" Released: 1997; 3. "Chupacabras" Released: 1997; 4. "Melaza" Released: 1997

Ser Humano!! (English: Human Being!!) is the debut studio album by Chilean hip-hop group Tiro de Gracia, released in 1997 through EMI Odeon. It was produced by Camilo Cintolesi and Patricio "Adonai" Loaiza, both members of the group, and Gaston "Cenzi" Gabarro, member of Chilean hip-hop group Makiza, the album features appearances from Camilo "Tea Time" Castaldi and Cristian "C-Funk" Moraga from Chilean band Los Tetas, Pedro Foncea, Quique Neira, Ema Pinto and Joe Vasconcellos. The project was recorded at Kostantinopla Studios in Santiago, owned by Carlos Cabezas from the band Electrodomésticos. The cover features a close-up to the faces of Juan Sativo and Lenwa Dura (members of the group), and was taken by Sebastián Domínguez, manager of Makiza.

The album is considered as one of the albums that opened the door to hip-hop music in Chile, becoming one of the first releases of the genre of achieve commercial success in the country, specially with the lead single of the album, "El Juego Verdadero", one of the signature songs of the group. The Chilean edition of Rolling Stone included the album in their list of 50 Best Chilean Albums, placing it at number six.

== Background ==
Tiro de Gracia began with Amador Fabián Sánchez (Lenwa Dura) and Juan Salazar (Juan Sativo) while both were still teenagers during the early nineties, after several performances in different local venues as well as recording demos independently, they appeared on a national hip-hop television program that gave them the exposure to start a more professional career, later they would include Juan Lagos (Zaturno) into the group alongside Camilo Cintolesi and Patricio "Adonai" Loaiza, the latter two being the producers of the album, following the recording of 1996's El Demo Final (The Final Demo), the group was signed to EMI and eventually released their debut album in 1997. About the recording of the album, Juan Sativo said "it was a very hard job of designing, it was a big adventure, I have the best memories from it and of the members of Tiro de Gracia".

The album spawned four singles, "El Juego Verdadero", "Melaza", "Viaje sin Rumbo" and "Chupacabras". The album's first single, "El Juego Verdadero", achieved significant radio play with very little promotion, the song would become one of the most recognizable songs by the group as well as one of the first hip-hop songs to gain such attention in Chile.

During its recording and after its release, the album faced significant censorship from radio stations and their label EMI. The songs "María" and "Paloma Profunda", currently available on YouTube, were discarded from the album due to their allusions to marijuana. The song "Viaje sin Rumbo" was the song that sparked the most censorship out of all the songs from the album, mainly because of its lyrics mentioning abortion, which was a controversial topic in Chilean society at the time, Lenwaa Dura said that "Chilean music was super limited, super censored, getting to stardom was almost impossible, we were coming from a dictatorship, one that still had effect on the media, you couldn't say everything you wanted to say, when we released Ser Humano!! we were met with too many restrinctions, "Viaje sin Rumbo" was censored, it was difficult to believe that you would get too far". Despite the censorship and lack of prominent promotion, the album was highly successful, selling 60,000 copies in fifteen months from its release.

== Composition ==
The album is composed by twenty-one tracks, sixteen songs and five interludes. It features appearances from different Chilean artists, Ema Pinto in "Ser Humano", Quique Neira in "Bebedor", as well as providing background vocals in "El Juego Verdadero", Pedro Foncea in "Corsario Universal", Joe Vasconcellos in "Leyenda Negra" and Los Tetas in "Nuestra Fiesta (Okupa, Segura y No Molesta)", specifically members Tea Time and C-Funk, Juan Sativo had previously featured in the song "Cha Cha Cha (Funky Muchacha)" by Los Tetas, which gave him exposure prior to the release of the album. All of the five interludes ("Manos Extrañas", "Como Se Siente", "Por Que Haces Esto?", "Puntos de Vista" and "Incienso Sativo") last less than ten seconds and are small excerpts from the Latin American dub of American science-fiction television series Lost in Space.

Different social issues appear through the album, the song "Viaje sin Rumbo" mentions issues like teenage pregnancy, abortion, AIDS and drug-addiction, according to Lenwa Dura, the song was inspired in part by one of his friends who was dealing with cocaine addiction. The song "Chupacabras", named after the legendary creature of the same name, is a "ridiculous explanation for the perversions of certain men during the art of seduction", containing lines such as "Amador del sexo, sangre, hambre de olor femenino, confundido como el violador de Maipú, el Chupacabras, ser ardiente, como tú y como yo" ("Lover of sex, of blood, hunger for feminine smell, confused as the rapist from Maipú, the Chupacabras, fiery being, like you and me").

== Promotion ==
Despite the lack of traditional promotion, with the group giving few interviews and radio appearances, the album was promoted in alternative ways, during 1998, they released a parody newspaper inspired in the song "Chupacabras", as well as a comic based on the music video for "Viaje sin Rumbo", the group also released a homemade documentary film named Comienza un Nuevo Día... about the creation process of the album.

The physical versions of the album contained a nail, according to Gaspar Domínguez, the marketing manager of EMI, the nail "meant several things, the album was very sharp, it was work material from popular neighbourhoods, the nail was an element that added weight to the album, which was literally the heaviest in the market, it weighed more than other albums, in addition to the tremendous music it had, I remember we had to buy thousands of nails afterwards and hammer the round part of them so that they could enter in the box". Promotion for the album also included a series of fake threats to different media, sending anonymously a rusty nail and a telegram that said "On monday you'll receive your deserved coup de grace, the game is real" to several newspaper editors and radio directors, referencing in the message to both the name of the group (coup de grace in English) and the song "El Juego Verdadero" ("The Real Game").

== Track listing ==
All tracks were produced by Patricio "Adonai" Loaiza and Camilo Cintolesi.

Ser Hümano!!
No.	Title	Lyrics	Music	Length
1.	"Ser Humano"	Juan Salazar	Patricio Loaiza	1:54
2.	"Ser Humano N°2"	Salazar	Camilo Cintolesi; Cristian Hidalgo; Loaiza	2:38
3.	"El Juego Verdadero"	Salazar	Cintolesi; Gastón Gabarró; Loaiza	3:12
4.	"Clavo y Martilleo"	Salazar	Loaiza	3:20
5.	"Manos Extrañas"	Interlude		0:12
6.	"Sombras Chinescas"	Salazar	Cintolesi; Loaiza; Rodrigo Chepillo	3:51
7.	"¿Cómo Se Siente?"	Interlude		0:08
8.	"Dos Corazones"	Salazar	Loaiza	3:34
9.	"Inteploración (Pacto con las Ánimas)"	Juan Lagos; Salazar	Loaiza	1:10
10.	"Corsario Universal"	Salazar	Hidalgo; Loaiza	3:49
11.	"¿Por Qué Haces Esto?"	Interlude		0:07
12.	"Viaje sin Rumbo"	Amador Sánchez	Gabarró; Loaiza	3:39
13.	"Puntos de Vista"	Interlude		0:04
14.	"Chupacabras"	Sánchez; Lagos; Salazar	Gabarró; Loaiza	3:50
15.	"Nuestra Fiesta (Okupa, Segura y No Molesta)"	Sánchez; Camilo Castaldi; Cristián Moraga; Lagos; Salazar	Cintolesi; Moraga; Loaiza; Chepillo	2:07
16.	"Incienso Sativo"	Interlude		0:09
17.	"Melaza"	Lagos; Salazar	Loaiza	2:59
18.	"Opyo"	Sánchez; Salazar	Loaiza	4:03
19.	"Bebedor"	Salazar	Inostroza; Loaiza; Quique Neira	3:11
20.	"Leyenda Negra"	Fernando Sánchez	Cintolesi; Hidalgo; Loaiza	5:58
21.	"Combo 10"	Chico A; Amador Sánchez; César Azar; Men-T; Drago; Nalini; Loaiza; Seo2; Scooby	Loaiza	3:18
Total length:				53:12

=== Sample credits ===
- "Ser Humano N°2" samples the song "Montuno Funk", written by Jim Akimoto, Jez Colin and Willie McNeil, and performed by The Solsonics.
- "El Juego Verdadero" samples the song "Just the Two of Us", written by Bill Withers and Williams Salter, and performed by Withers and Grover Washington Jr.
- "Corsario Universal" samples the song "Red Clay", written and performed by Freddie Hubbard.
- "Melaza" samples the song "Dirt in the Ground", written and performed by Tom Waits.

== Reception ==
The album is considered as an influential album, specially to the Chilean hip-hop scene, being one of the first releases to achieve mainstream appeal and commercial success, gaining recognition outside of the underground scene, the project also marks the beginning of the career of the group as one of the main precursors of hip-hop in the country. The album was included in the list of 50 Best Chilean Albums at number 6, released by the Chilean edition of the American magazine Rolling Stone in 2008, the list was voted by several Chilean musicians and music critics.

=== All-time lists ===
Publication	Country	List	Year	Rank	Ref.
Rolling Stone	Chile	50 Best Chilean Albums	2008	6	

== Credits ==
Credits adapted from the album's liner notes.

=== Tiro de Gracia ===
- Juan Sativo – vocals, logo, tags, drawings
- Lengua Dura – vocals, backing vocals
- Zaturno – vocals, backing vocals
- Patricio Loaiza – keyboards, sampler, sequence programming, sampler editing, musical production, mixing, mastering, vocals (track 21)
- Camilo Cintolesi – keyboards, guitar, general production, musical production, mixing, mastering, management

=== Musicians ===
- Ema Pinto – backing vocals (track 1)
- Quique Neira – backing vocals (tracks 2, 3, 19)
- Chino G – backing vocals (tracks 2, 15)
- KVzón – backing vocals (track 2)
- Javier Rodríguez (track 2), Pirzen (track 3), Pilsener (track 8), Guatón Pirzoca (track 12), Moai (track 15), and Javier Morgue (track 18) – cymbals
- Toly Ramírez – bass (tracks 3, 8, 19), double bass (track 12)
- Carlos Cabezas – percussion [hammer] (track 4)
- Rodrigo Chepillo – bass, keyboards (tracks 6, 15)
- Camilo "Tea Time" Castaldi – scratches (tracks 6, 8), vocals (track 15)
- DJ Raff – scratches (track 9)
- Pedro Foncea – backing vocals (track 10)
- MC Zap – spatial concept (track 10)
- Gastón "Cenzi" Gabarró – guitar (track 12), bass (track 14)
- DJ Squat – scratches (track 14)
- Cristián "C-Funk" Moraga – vocals, keyboards (track 15)
- Joe Vasconcellos – percussion, vocals (track 20)
- Chico A – vocals (track 21)
- César Azar – vocals (track 21)
- Men-T – vocals (track 21)
- Drago – vocals (track 21)
- Nalini – vocals (track 21)
- Seo2 – vocals (track 21)
- Scooby – vocals (track 21)

=== Technical and design ===
- Gonzalo "Chalo" González – recording engineer, mixing, mastering
- Joaquín García – mastering
- Marcelo Ulloa – assistant engineer
- Michel Durot – assistant engineer
- Juan Sebastián Domínguez R. – production assistant, cover and booklet photography
- Pablo Hermansen – booklet photography
- Wilo Gómez – art direction, nail
- Leo Lazcano – design, nail
