= DJ Bitman =

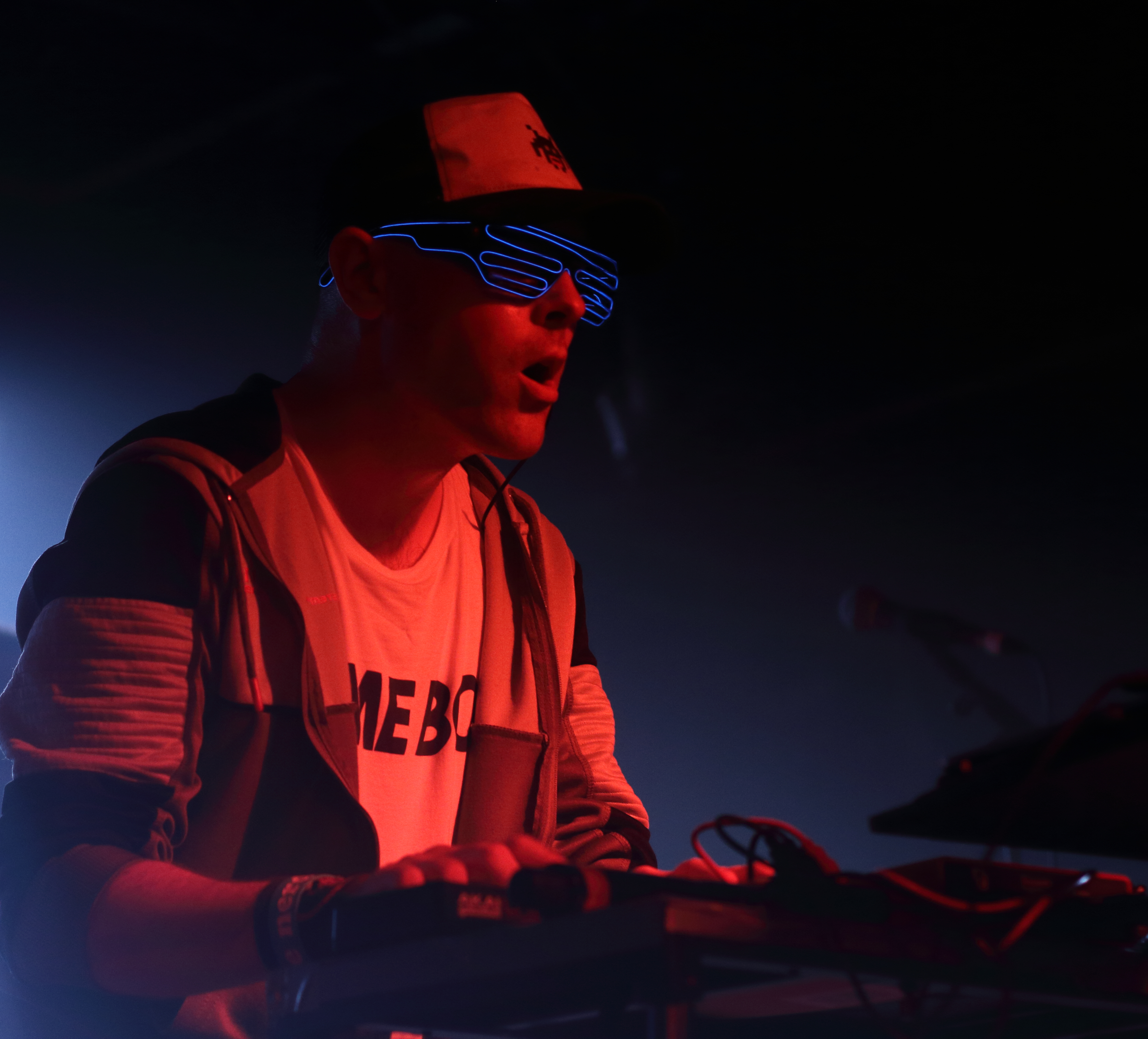

Background information
- Birth name: José Antonio Bravo
- Also known as: Bitman, Latin Bitman, Bitman and Roban
- Born: 1975 (age 49–50)
- Origin: Arica, Chile
- Genres: Electronica, hip hop, funk
- Occupation(s): DJ, record producer
- Years active: 1999–present
- Labels: Nacional Records, Feria Music
- Website: Latin Bitman Official website

DJ Bitman (born José Antonio Bravo; 1975), also known as Latin Bitman or simply Bitman, is a Chilean electronic music producer, composer and DJ. He is known for his work combining electronic music with funk, hip hop and Latin American rhythms.

Bitman is one of the most well-known Chilean DJs on the international scene, has a successful solo career and has collaborated with many other artists from different genres, such as Sen Dog and Eric Bobo from Cypress Hill, Francisca Valenzuela, DJ Raff, Los Tetas and Anita Tijoux. Bitman has performed in many locations around the world including some of the biggest music festivals, including Lollapalooza in Chicago, Lollapalooza Chile, and Cypress Hill's Smokeout Festival. One of his most famous tracks is part of the soundtrack of the popular football video game by EA Sports: "Get on the Floor" in FIFA 07. "Me Gustan" in FIFA 09, "The Instrumento" in 2010 FIFA World Cup South Africa and "Blackbossa" in 2014 FIFA World Cup Brazil. Get on the Floor also featured in the reality tv show, The Chicas Project.

== Career ==
José Antonio Bravo was born in Arica, a city in the extreme northern region of Arica y Parinacota Region of Chile in 1975. Bitman moved to Santiago in the 1990s to study and then work as a designer. There he met architect Christian Powditch, with whom he began to explore music composition with very simple software. The duo eventually acquired the name “Bitman & Roban” (a play on Batman & Robin). The sound of their first album “Hurtos” (“Robberies”, 2000) was very close to Hip Hop. On their second album, “Robar es natural” (“Stealing is natural”, 2002), the duo included real voices and instruments, changing the previous purely digitally constructed sound. In 2003, DJ Bitman released his first solo album, “Sunset beats” (2003) with the collaboration of jazz bassist Roberto Titae Lindl (Los Tres) and members of Tiro de Gracia and Los Tetas. “Música para después de almuerzo” (“Music for after lunch”, 2005) was his third album with Bitman & Roban, this time as a whole band instead of a duo.

In 2006, he collaborated as a producer in the album “Quintana Roo” (R-H), a side project, and in 2007 released “Latin Bitman”, a mix of electronic bases and acoustic instruments such as (Double bass, Marimba, Guitar, Piano and Hammond organ). This produced an exotic sound that resembles jazz, bossa nova, funk, chachachá and mambo. In live performances, Latin Bitman is supported by an orchestra. “Colour” (2009) repeated the technique of including different elements and takes this even further. It also included Bitman’s first collaboration with Francisca Valenzuela on the track "Help me”.

In 2011, Bitman teamed up with Eric Bobo of Cypress Hill to form the group Ritmo Machine, which released the album "Welcome To The Ritmo Machine" in November 2011. Since 2011, he has collaborated on the soundtracks of several international films, including Aftershock (2012), Crystal Fairy & the Magical Cactus (2012), From Prada to Nada (2011).

== Discography ==
=== Albums ===
- Sunset Beats (2003 – Big Sur Records)
- Latin Bitman (2007 - Nacional Records NCL 20002)
- Colour (2009 - Nacional Records NCNL 20032)
- Airplane (2015 – Nacional Records PICD 000260)

=== Compilations ===
- 10 years mixtape (2013 - Independent)

=== Singles, EPs and others ===
- Homenaje a Los Jaivas (2006 - La Oreja)
- Quintana Roo – RH (2006 - Nacional Records)
- Catedral en coma. Vol. 3 (2008 - Independent)
- Fuerza Chile (2010 - Independent)
- EP: el compilado (2012 - Independent)

Soundtracks

- Crystal Fairy & the Magical Cactus (2012) (as DJ Bitman, "Bundle (4to Poder Ruff)", "Like It") / (writer: "Bundle (4to Poder Ruff)", "Like It" - as DJ Bitman)
- Aftershock (2012) (performer: "Help Me") / (writer: "Help Me")
- Revenge Pilot (2011), (TV Series) (performer - 1 episode) -... (performer: "Summertime" - uncredited)
- From Prada to Nada (2011) (performer: "Help Me")
- Dexter (2010) (TV Series) (performer - 1 episode, 2010) (writer - 1 episode, 2010) - Circle Us (2010) (performer: "I Wanna Wake You Up" - uncredited) / (writer: "I Wanna Wake You Up" - uncredited)
- Antipop (2010) (TV Series documentary) (performer - 1 episode) - Hip Hop en Chile (2010) ... (performer: "Help Me", "La rosa de los vientos", "Tropilove").
