= Audiovision (disambiguation) =

Audiovision was a Swedish metal band.

Audiovision may also refer to:

- Audio description, descriptive video, narration added to films for the sight-impaired
- Audiovision, simultaneous use of separate audio and visual media in distance learning
- Audiovisión, a 2010 album by the Chilean singer-songwriter Gepe
- Audio-Visions, a 1980 album by American progressive rock band Kansas
- Audio Visions, XM Satellite Radio channel
- Apple AudioVision 14 Display
