= Carlos Cabezas (disambiguation) =

Carlos Cabezas, Spanish basquetballer.

Carlos Cabezas may also refer to:

- Carlos Cabezas (Electrodomésticos), Chilean musician, leader of Electrodomésticos
- Carlos Cabezas (Los Jaivas), Chilean musician, singer and multi-instrumentalist of Los Jaivas
