= Fernando Milagros =

- Born: Fernando Briones; February 1980 (age 45–46)
- Origin: Talcahuano, Chile
- Genres: Pop rock, trova, acoustic
- Years active: 2006–present
- Labels: Oveja Negra; Quemasucabeza; Adelante Estudios; Plaza Independencia Música; Jungla Music

Fernando Milagros (Talcahuano, Chile, February 1980) is a Chilean pop rock singer-songwriter and a part of the independent music scene in Santiago. He was born Fernando Briones and got his stage name from his three years as the singer and bass player in the band Maria Milagros. He has divided his time between music and a successful career in theater design.

In 2006, Milagros made his first solo album, Vacaciones en el Patio de mi Casa (Vacations In My Backyard), which was released in 2007. He followed this up with performances throughout 2008 in bars around Santiago, and opened for the Anglo-French singer Jane Birkin, also in 2008

Milagros released his second album, Por Su Atención Gracias (For Your Attention Thank You), in 2009. Following the example of other Chilean singer-songwriters like Leo Quinteros and Manuel García, Milagros enlisted the help of a support band, The Falsos (The Fakes), on the album, who are credited next to Milagros on the album cover.

It was Milagros’ third release, San Sebastián (2011), that brought him international recognition. The album was produced by Christian Heyne (Javiera Mena, Gepe) and included a collaboration with the well-known Spanish singer Christina Rosenvinge - with whom Milagros also performed live in 2011 - on the track Pedazos (niño bomba). It also featured support from fellow Chilean artist Gepe on drums. After recording the album, Milagros went on to perform at the 2011 Primavera Sound festival in Barcelona, Spain.

== Discography ==
- Vacaciones en el patio de mi casa (2007 - Neurotyka)
- Por su atención gracias (2009 - Oveja Negra)
- San Sebastián (2011 - Quemasucabeza)
- Nuevo Sol (2014 - Evolución)
- Milagros (2017)
