= Gepinto =

Album by Gepe

Studio album by Gepe
- Released: 2005
- Recorded: 2004–05
- Genre: Indie folk, Pop, Electropop
- Length: 39:50
- Label: Quemasucabeza; Astro Discos; Darla Records
- Producer: Rodrigo Santis

Gepe chronology
5x5 (2004)	Gepinto (2005)	Hungría (2007)

Singles from Gepinto
- 1. "Namás" Released: 2005; 2. "Los Barcos" Released: 2005; 3. "La Enfermedad de los Ojos" Released: 2006; 4. "Estilo Internacional" Released: 2007

Gepinto is the first studio album of the Chilean musician Daniel Riveros, better known as Gepe, released in 2005 under the independent label Quemasucabeza after his EP 5x5. This album includes his first success, entitled "Namás" With the participation of the singer Dadalú. In April 2008, the Chilean edition of Rolling Stone magazine placed him in the 22nd place in the 50 best Chilean records of all time.

== Track listing ==
No.	Title	Length
1.	"La enfermedad de los ojos" (The Disease of the Eyes)	3:06
2.	"Nunca mucho" (Never Much)	3:39
3.	"Multiplicación" (Multiplication)	2:22
4.	"Sal" (Salt)	3:03
5.	"Namás" (Namas)	3:39
6.	"Los barcos" (The Ships)	2:25
7.	"Los trapenses" (The Trappists)	2:55
8.	"El gran mal" (The Great Evil)	3:09
9.	"Torremolinos" (Towermills)	2:37
10.	"Vacaciones" (Holidays)	3:01
11.	"Nihilo" (Nothing)	4:00
12.	"Estilo internacional" (International Style)	3:21
13.	"Guinea"	2:33
Total length:		39:50

== Personnel ==
Interpreters

- Gepe: Voice, guitar, keyboards, percussion, metallophone.
- Pablo Flores: Accordion, percussion, charango, kaoss Pad, bass.
- Sebastián Sampieri: Charango, percussion, rhythmic.

Others

- Gepe: Artwork
- Jean Despujol: Artwork
- Pablo González: Mastering
- Rodrigo Santis: Mixes, production, recording

== Accolades ==
Publication	Country	Accolade	Year	Rank
Alborde	United States	Los 250 álbumes más importantes del Rock Iberoamericano	2006	241
Rolling Stone	Chile	Los 50 mejores discos chilenos	2008	22
Club Fonograma	United States	Best albums of the decade. 2000-2009	2009	12
