= Perrosky =

Chilean rock music band

- Origin: Copiapó, Chile
- Genres: Rock, rock and roll, folk rock
- Years active: 2001–present
- Labels: Algo Records
- Members: Current members: Alejandro Gómez Álvaro Gómez
- Website: http://www.myspace.com/losperrosky

Perrosky is a Chilean band formed by the brothers Alejandro and Álvaro Gómez, originally from the city of Copiapó, Chile. Their influences include rock and roll, folk and blues.

== Early years ==
The name "Perrosky" came from the childhood nickname of Alejandro, who was originally a solo performer before forming a duo with brother Álvaro.

Originally from Copiapó, Alejandro moved to Santiago to study music, but left to form the garage rock band Guiso with his brother Álvaro, Álvaro Guerra, and later, Bernardita Martínez.

== First tracks ==
In 2001, initially with a small repertoire of songs, Alejandro recorded his first acoustic low fidelity cassette called Añejo ("aged") and made his live debut in a bar in the neighborhood of Ñuñoa, Santiago. After this gig, Alejandro recruited his brother Álvaro to join him on drums, and the Perrosky style changed to become more electric. Although still playing in their parallel project Guiso, the Perrosky duo also began performing gigs in Santiago and other cities in Chile.

== Albums and festivals ==
In 2004, Perrosky released a six track album called Otra Vez ("Again"), which they later combined with tracks from Añejo to form their first full-length album, El Ritmo y la Calle ("Rhythm and the Street"), released in 2007.

They have since released several EP and LPs Including a disc of covers "Doblando al Español" that includes covers of Eddie Cochrane, Velvet Underground, Rolling Stones, Atahualpa Yupanqui and the Chileans Hielo Negro and Leo Quinteros.

Perrosky will form part of the line-up for the third edition of Lollapalooza Chile, taking place in Santiago in April 2013.

== Members ==
- Alejandro Gómez
- Álvaro Gómez

== Discography ==
Original Albums

- Añejo (2001 – Algo Records)
- El ritmo y la calle (2007 – Algo Records)
- Doblando al español (2008 – Algo Records)
- Tostado (2010 – Algo Records)
- Vivos (2013 – Algo Records)

Other editions

(EPs, Compilations, Live Records, DVDs, re-editions)

- Otra vez EP (2004 – Algo Records)
- Campante y sonante EP (2010)
- Son del montón EP (2010)

Collaborations

- Catedral en coma Vol. 3 (2008)
- Rumos (2009 – International edition)
- Primer almuerzo: sesiones para Radio Guerritas 2009 (2009)
- Música x memoria (2011)
- EP: El compilado (2012)
