= Apoyando La Demencia =

Demo album by Sinergia
- Released: 1998
- Recorded: 1996–1998, Konstantinopla Recording Studio
- Genre: Alternative metal, experimental rock, nu metal
- Language: Spanish
- Label: Independent

Sinergia chronology
Apoyando La Demencia (1998)	Sinergia (2001)

Apoyando La Demencia (Supporting Dementia) is a demo released by Chilean rock band, Sinergia, in 1998.

The first half of the demo was recorded in 20 hours on Konstantinopla's Recording Studio after winning Radio Tierra's rock band contest. In 1998 they recorded the rest and finally edited and finished the demo.

This demo was released independently by Sinergia, with their best songs that they have written so far, and a cover of Soda Stereo from their "Canción Animal" album, the song "En El Séptimo Día".

The songs "Chupatrón" and "Santiago U.S.A.", also appear in the debut album of the band.

In this demo album the band experiments with various styles as funk metal, alternative metal, nu metal, jazz fusion and ska.

== Track listing ==
All songs were written by Sinergia, except "En El Séptimo Día".

No.	Title	Writer(s)	Length
1.	"Contemos a la Inversa"	Sinergia
2.	"Poder"	Sinergia
3.	"Chupatrón"	Sinergia
4.	"Reflexiones de Tom sobre el Acontecer Político Nacional"	Sinergia
5.	"Pacman"	Sinergia
6.	"Santiago U.S.A."	Sinergia
7.	"Mil Dólares por el Seis"	Sinergia
8.	"Control"	Sinergia
9.	"Vienen los Pakos"	Sinergia
10.	"Deshacer"	Sinergia
11.	"En El Séptimo Día"	Gustavo Cerati

== Credits ==
- Rodrigo "Don Rorro" Osorio - Vocals
- Pedro "Pedrale" López Figueroa - Guitar
- Alexis "Aneres" Gonzalez - Bass Guitar
- Luis Silva - Drums
- Paul "DJ Panoramix" Eberhard - Turntables, Samplers, Percussion
