= La Pozze Latina =

La Pozze Latina was a hip hop band from Chile active from 1991 to 2000. The group was formed in 1991 in Santiago by Rodrigo Johan Mendez (a.k.a. MC Rody or Too Small) who had recently arrived from The Netherlands and was the son of Patricia Vera a political refugee, he made the beats with a drum machine and an Ensoniq sampler. The latter would return to Europe in 1995, leaving Jimmy Fernández as a frontman who arrived from exile in East Germany in 1993.

Their biggest hits are the Con el olor de mi aliento (the first Hip Hop video made in Latinamerica issued by MTV Latino), Chica eléctrica and the coversong Pedro Navaja from Rubén Blades. La Pozze Latina have been one of the pillars of hip hop in Chile, not only because it was one of the first groups to practice the kind in the country, but also because they placed pioneering rap on local radio stations, before the jump to fame of Tiro de Gracia and Makiza.

Jimmy Fernandez (also known as Jimmy Jeffs, Kid Latin, Panama Red), band leader, grew up in Panama, and since 1985 lived in Italy. Fernandez arrived in Chile in 1988, and joined the dance groups restricted who gathered in downtown Santiago. His greatest hip hop genre knowledge earned him a place in the local scene and make friends with bands like the Panteras Negras, Los Marginales, and through them, to Pedro Foncea, from De Kiruza. The group also took the leap to fame of DJ Raff, one of the most important in Latinoamérica

== Discography ==
- Pozzeídos por la ilusión (1993)
- Una nueva religión (1996)
- Desde el mundo de los espejos (1999)
