= Sinergia (Sinergia album) =

Studio album by Sinergia
- Released: 2001; 2002; 2003
- Recorded: May–June, 2001
- Studios: Estudio Mix; Clio; Estudio Master; Estudio Sonus
- Genres: Alternative metal, experimental rock, nu metal
- Length: 33:31
- Language: Chilean Spanish
- Labels: Independent (2001); Sello Azul (2002); La Oreja (2003)
- Producer: Andrés Godoy

Sinergia chronology
Apoyando La Demencia (1998)	Sinergia (00000000)	Procésalo Todo (2004)

Singles from Sinergia
- 1. "Mujer Robusta" Released: June 2002; 2. "Concurso" Released: October 2002; 3. "Chilerobot" Released: March 2003; 4. "Amor Alternativo" Released: September 2003

Sinergia (Synergy) is the self-titled debut studio album released by Chilean rock band Sinergia, independently in 2001 consisting of 12 tracks; by Sello Azul label in 2002 consisting of 13 tracks and by La Oreja label in 2003 consisting of 14 tracks and 3 music videos for the singles "Chilerobot", "Concurso" and "Mujer Robusta". The album was produced by Andrés Godoy, father of the band's drummer Bruno "Brunanza" Godoy.

The songs "Chupatrón" and "Santiago U.S.A." are originally from their demo album "Apoyando La Demencia", this time with an intro song for "Chupatrón".

The music video for the single "Mujer Robusta" reached the number one position in the ranking "Los 10 + Pedidos" (The 10 Most Requested Videos) of the South American MTV channel, and the song "Marina" is a "pajaron (Note: a South American word referring to people who are a bit vague or slow to understand) hymn", which is mainly the spirit of the band and his fans (who are called "pajarones"), the song's about how a young guy falls madly in love with a girl called Marina and thinks that studying is the best way to get her attention but that doesn't help him at all in getting the courage to talk to her and tell her how he feels.

The songs "Mujer Robusta", "Amor Alternativo", "Marina", "Concurso", "Chupatrón" and "Chilerobot" are in the recently released 22 Éxitos Pajarones, a compilation album celebrating the band's 22nd anniversary

The album has 4 editions, the first edition of the album, where "'Mujer Robusta" does not appear, It didn't get many editions. The second, It's from "Sello Azul", with "Mujer Robusta", as a bonus track, releasing many more editions. The Third, has all the songs, so it is the definitive edition of the disc. The fourth is the commemorative edition of the album (20 Years) has 2 more bonus tracks, "Liquidación" and "Le Tengo Miedo A Todo".

== Track listing ==
2001's Independent Release
No.	Title	Writer(s)	Length
1.	"Mi Auto (My Car)"	Sinergia	2:36
2.	"Concurso (Contest)"	Julio Ortega; Sinergia	3:03
3.	"Basura (Garbage)"	Sinergia	2:50
4.	"Amor Alternativo (Alternative Love)"	Sinergia	3:56
5.	"Intro Chupatrón"	Luis Silva; Sinergia	1:20
6.	"Chupatrón"	Luis Silva; Sinergia	3:28
7.	"Cabeza de Abajo (Downside Head)"	Luis Silva; Johnny Cuent; Sinergia	2:34
8.	"Marina (Marina, female name)"	Sinergia	3:08
9.	"Playero (Beach Song)"	Sinergia	1:21
10.	"Chilerobot (Chilean robot)"	Sinergia	3:07
11.	"Santiago U.S.A. (reference to Santiago, Chile being Americanized)"	Luis Silva; Sinergia	3:07
12.	"Sinergia (Synergy)"	Luis Silva; Sinergia	1:01
Total length:			33:31

2002's Sello Azul Rerelease
No.	Title	Writer(s)	Length
13.	"Mujer Robusta (Sturdy Woman)"	Sinergia	2:38
Total length:			36:09

2003's La Oreja Re-Rerelease
No.	Title	Writer(s)	Length
14.	"Concurso (Live)"	Julio Ortega; Sinergia	2:55
Total length:			39:04

- In the 2003's edition the music videos of Mujer Robusta, Concurso and Chilerobot can only be found by introducing the CD to a computer, where can be found in a folder.

== Credits and personnel ==
Credits taken from Sinergia's (2003 edition) liner notes.

- Rodrigo Osorio - composer, vocals
- Alexis González - composer, bass guitar
- Pedro López - composer, guitar
- Bruno Godoy - composer, drums
- Paul Eberhard - composer, turntables
- Andrés Godoy - producer
- Walter Romero - recording engineer, mixing
- Miguel Foulon - recording engineer
- Miguel Bahamondes - mastering
- Ximena Montenegro - recording and mixing assistant
- Joaquin García - re-mastering
- Ramón Lorca - samples post-edition
- Alvaro Hoppe - collage, cover and back cover photography
- Anita Flores - photography
- Jorge Guajardo - photography
- Jaime Muñoz - photography
- Don Lalo - photography
- Sobras Producciones - photography, music videos' producers
- José Salinas - art designer
- Johnny Cuent - composer
- Luis Silva - composer
- Julio Ortega - composer
- Eduardo Bertrán - music videos' director
