= Yael Meyer =

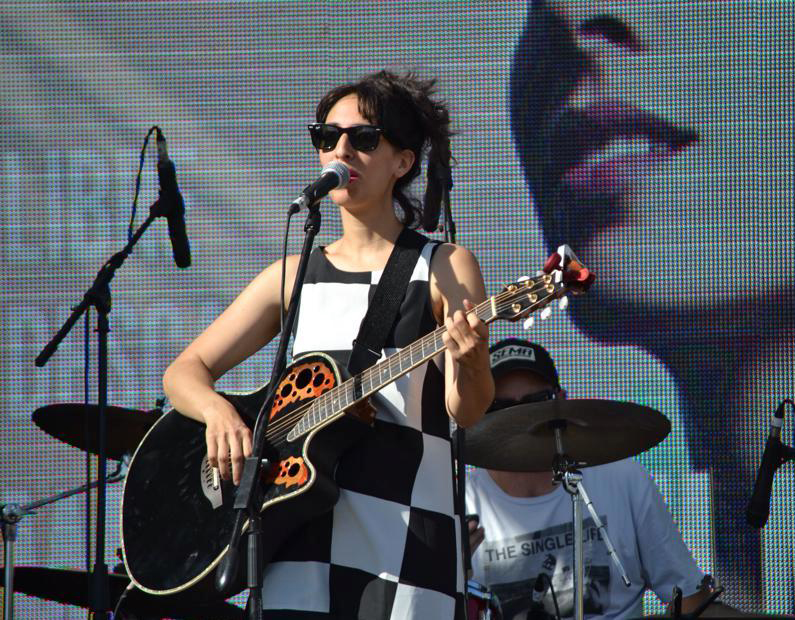
- Meyer performing in 2014

Background information
- Born: Yael Elisa Meyer Barbarach; June 13, 1981 (age 45); Santiago, Chile
- Genres: Indie folk, indie pop, electronic
- Occupations: Singer, songwriter, musician, producer
- Instruments: Guitar, bass, percussion, accordion, glockenspiel, keyboards, piano, melodica, ukulele, ocarina
- Years active: 2000–present
- Labels: Yael Meyer Music; Kli Records
- Website: yaelmeyermusic.com

Yael Meyer (born Yael Elisa Meyer Barbarach, June 13, 1981) is a Los Angeles-based singer, songwriter, musician and producer.

== Early life and education ==
Meyer was born in Santiago, Chile. She starting playing piano at the age of 5, began writing original music at 8, and learned the guitar at 13. As a teenager, she participated in various music festivals in Chile, and was a youth leader at Maccabi Hatzair, a Jewish youth organization there.

== Career ==
=== Common Ground and Heartbeat EP (2000-09) ===
At age 19, Meyer left Chile for Boston, Massachusetts, to attend the Berklee College of Music on a scholarship. She graduated in 2003. It was in Boston that she wrote, produced and recorded her debut album, Common Ground, released in the US in 2004. She played all the instruments on the album, producing and engineering most of the record herself. A blend of indie folk and lounge electronica, Rolling Stone Chile called it "one of the top 50 albums of the year."

On November 10, 2009, her five-song Heartbeat EP was released. Meyer wrote all the songs and played multiple instruments, including guitar, ukulele, keyboards and glockenspiel. The EP was recorded in Los Angeles and produced by Bill Lefler (Ingrid Michaelson, Tim Myers, Fall Out Boy, Gym Class Heroes), with guest appearances by Danny Levin on trumpet, Fil Krohnengold on acoustic guitar and accordion, and Joseph Karnes on bass. The first track, "Shed Their Fear," was called "a hopeful, pretty song" by Nic Harcourt in Los Angeles Times Magazine.

=== Everything Will Be Alright and soundtracks (2010-13) ===
Meyer's second full-length album, Everything Will Be Alright, was released on November 15, 2011, on her record label, Kli Records. The Wall Street Journal called it "a bright, affecting album in which synthesized rhythms and ambient sounds burble under Ms. Meyer's soft, sweet voice, her sing-along melodies and her nylon-string guitar." Heeb deemed it a "sublime and wistful record," and Spin rated it a 7 out of 10. The album includes four songs from the Heartbeat EP, plus seven new songs. The single "Fire" was remixed by Colombian-Argentinian electronic folk duo Lulacruza in 2012.

Meyer has had songs featured in episodes of Private Practice on ABC; Life Unexpected on The CW; Awkward, Teen Mom 2, Teen Mom 3 and 16 and Pregnant on MTV; Parenthood on NBC; Giuliana and Bill on Style; and Drop Dead Diva on Lifetime. In October 2010, "Tea For Two" was the opening track in an episode of Life Unexpected, and later appeared in a 2012 episode of Teen Mom 2. "Shed Their Fear" was the closing track in an episode of Private Practice, and it was also in a 2012 episode of Parenthood. "Used To Be" debuted on September 6, 2011, in an episode of the first season of Awkward. Other Meyer songs also appeared in the first season of Awkward: "Favorite Two" and "I Wonder How" from the Heartbeat EP, and the single "All Around Me", which was also in a 2011 episode of the third season of Drop Dead Diva. In 2012, "Tiny Nose" and "All Around Me" appeared on Giuliana and Bill. In June 2014, "All Around Me" reached #16 on the digital chart of South Korea's Gaon Music Chart. In 2013, "Backbone" and "Will They Forget" appeared on Teen Mom 3, and "Everything Will Be Alright" appeared on 16 and Pregnant.

Meyer wrote the song "Aqui" for the 2007 Chilean-Mexican film El Brindis, directed by Shai Agosin. The 2010 Chilean film Que Pena Tu Vida, directed by Nicolás López, included three songs by Meyer. She also had three songs in the 2011 sequel, Que Pena Tu Boda, and one song in the final film of the trilogy, Que Pena Tu Familia. Her songs were used in the 2011 film Blacktino, directed by Aaron Burns, and in the documentary Al Final del Tunel, directed by Eterio Ortega. A remix of the single "Fire (Computo Remix)" appears in the 2012 film Aftershock, directed by López, and produced by and starring Eli Roth. Her music has been used in Ralph Lauren runway shows, and her song "Beautiful People," a collaboration with Cathy Heller, was licensed for ABC for use in a network promo.

Meyer plays various instruments live and on her recordings, including guitar, bass, percussion, accordion, glockenspiel, keyboards, piano, melodica, ukulele and ocarina. She has toured the United States, Europe and South America, and performed at festivals around the world, including the Sziget Festival in Hungary in 2005, Lollapalooza Chile in 2012, the 2012 Washington Jewish Music Festival in Washington, D.C., and the 2015 C/O Pop Festival in Cologne, Germany.

=== Warrior Heart (2014-present) ===
Meyer's third studio album, Warrior Heart, was announced with the release of the title track and first single, which appeared as a free download on the Mercedes-Benz blog on January 17, 2014. The video for "Warrior Heart" premiered on the Wall Street Journal's Speakeasy section on July 16, 2014. The album was recorded in Los Angeles with Bill Lefler, and was released on Kli Records on September 16, 2014.

Meyer wrote and produced the song "When You Hold Me Tight" for the South Korean television series Healer. The song was released on the second part of the show's soundtrack on December 22, 2014. Entertainment Weekly called the Warrior Heart track "Human Divine" "bouncy, ebullient electropop" with "a timely, uplifting message." In March 2016, the video for her song "The Hunt" was named by Rolling Stone as one of the top 5 videos of the week.

== Honors ==
In 2010, Meyer was selected by MTV and OurStage as a Needle in the Haystack artist. She was selected by El Mercurio as one of the top 100 young leaders in Chile in 2014. In 2015, Rolling Stone called Meyer one of five Chilean singers to know about.

== Personal life ==
Meyer lived in Los Angeles, California from 2006 until 2014. Since then she resides in Chile, where she co-owns and co-manages her own company KLI Records and Publishing.

== Discography ==
=== Studio albums ===
- Common Ground (November 23, 2004, self-released)
- Everything Will Be Alright (November 15, 2011, Kli Records)
- Warrior Heart (March 26, 2015, Kli Records)

=== Extended plays ===
- Heartbeat EP (November 10, 2009, Happy Tree Music)

=== Compilations ===
- "The Beauty of It All", from KLA (June 1, 2009, Konfort Records)
- "Tiny Nose", from Celebrate Jewish Lullabies, Vol. 1 (February 22, 2011, Sweet Louise Music / BMI)

=== Singles ===
- "All Around Me" (March 1, 2010, Kli Records)
- "Fire" (October 23, 2011, Kli Records)
- "Warrior Heart" (January 17, 2014, Kli Records)

=== Television soundtracks ===
- "Tea For Two" – Life Unexpected (The CW), season 2, episode 6, October 19, 2010
- "Shed Their Fear" – Private Practice (ABC), season 4, episode 6, October 28, 2010
- "All Around Me" – Drop Dead Diva (Lifetime), season 3, episode 4, July 17, 2011
- "Favorite Two" – Awkward (MTV), season 1, episode 5, August 16, 2011
- "Used To Be" – Awkward (MTV), season 1, episode 8, September 6, 2011
- "I Wonder How" – Awkward (MTV), season 1, episode 9, September 13, 2011
- "All Around Me" – Awkward (MTV), season 1, episode 9, September 13, 2011
- "Tea for Two" – Teen Mom 2 (MTV), season 1, episode 9, January 24, 2012
- "Everything Will Be Alright" – 16 and Pregnant (MTV), season 4, episode 11, May 22, 2012
- "Shed Their Fear" – Parenthood (NBC), season 4, episode 5, October 9, 2012
- "Tiny Nose" – Giuliana and Bill (Style), season 5, episode 18, November 20, 2012
- "All Around Me" – Giuliana and Bill (Style), season 5, episode 19, November 27, 2012
- "Backbone" – Teen Mom 3 (MTV), season 1, episode 4, September 9, 2013
- "Will They Forget" – Teen Mom 3 (MTV), season 1, episode 4, September 9, 2013
- "Home To Me" – Holidaze (ABC Family), TV movie, November 28, 2013
- "When You Hold Me Tight" – Healer (KBS2), December 22, 2014
- "The Hunt" – Reign (The CW), season 3, episode 8, January 8, 2016
- "No Matter How Hard I Try" – Queen for Seven Days (KBS2), June 2017
- "Yo Soy (I am)" - The Rain (TV series) (Netflix), May 2018

=== Film soundtracks ===
- "Aqui" – El Brindis, dir. Shai Agosin, 2007
- "Tea for Two", "Favorite Two" and "Tiny Nose" – Que Pena Tu Vida, dir, Nicolás López, 2010
- "Used To Be", "Fire" and "The Night" – Que Pena Tu Boda, dir. Nicolás López, 2011
- Blacktino, dir. Aaron Burns, 2011
- Al Final del Tunel, dir. Eterio Ortega, 2011
- "Backbone" – Que Pena Tu Familia, dir. Nicolás López, 2012
- "Fire (Computo Remix)" – Aftershock, dir. Nicolás López, prod. Eli Roth, 2012
- "Backbone" and "Will They Forget" – Reach, dir. Daniel Bonjour, 2013
