= Leo Quinteros =

Chilean singer-songwriter (born 1975)

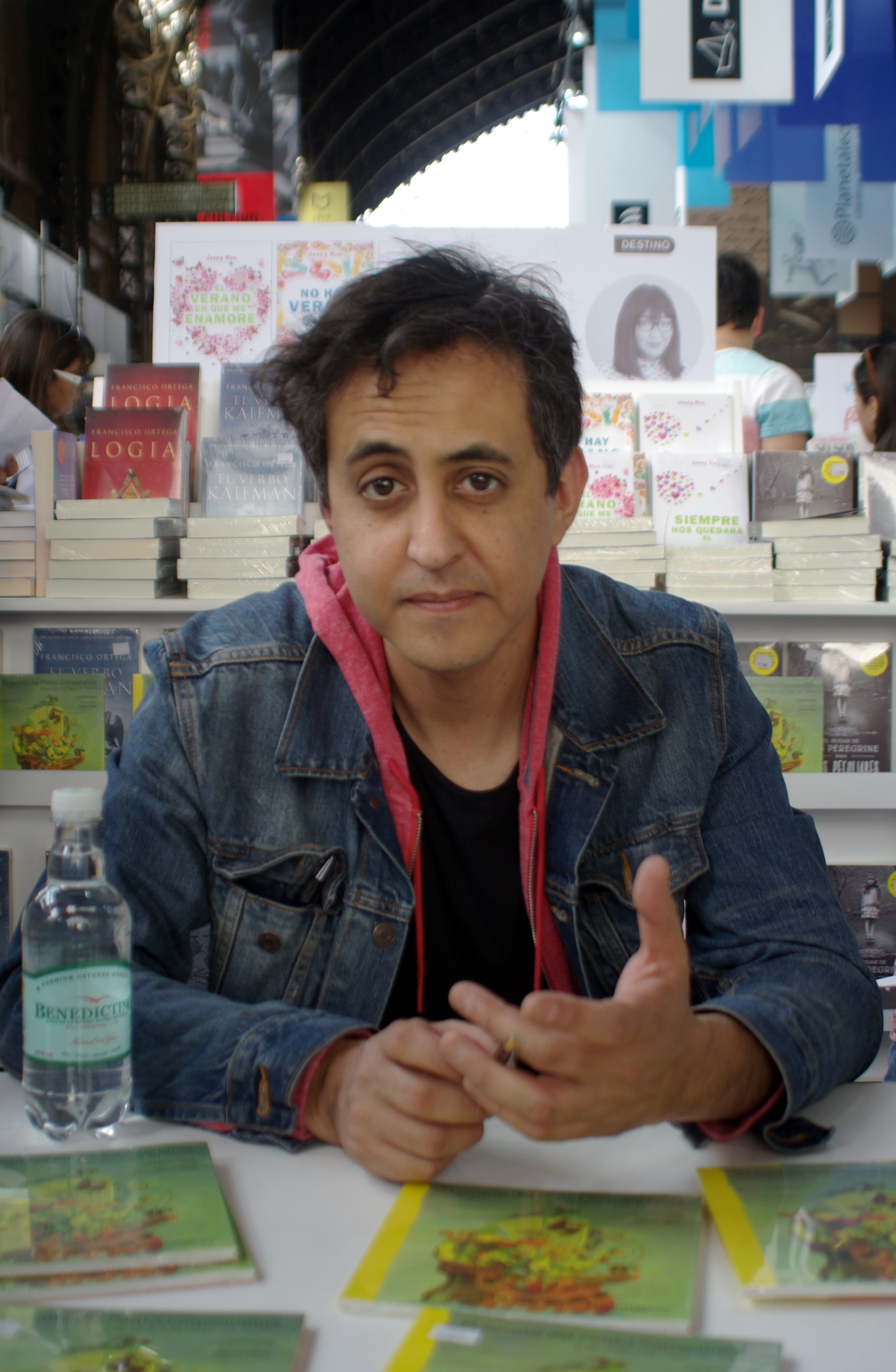
- Qinteros at the Santiago International Book Fair2015

Background information
- Born: Leonardo Andres Quinteros Fernandez; 11 July 1975 (age 51)
- Origin: Arica, Chile
- Genres: Rock, pop rock, acoustic
- Years active: 2002–present
- Website: Web Myspace

Leo Quinteros (Arica, 11 July 1975) is a Chilean singer-songwriter and guitarist. He made his official debut in 2004 with the album 1A, which was critically acclaimed for its technical finesse and lyrical depth.

== Career ==
Before embarking on his career as a musician, Quinteros gained a law degree and worked for a short time as a lawyer. In 2003, after some negative experiences playing in other bands, he decided to become a solo artist".

Quinteros' first solo album was a record of ten songs entitled Fallando (Failing), from which he released a single, Invisibilidad (Invisibility).

1A was his first official, full-length album, recorded independently in 2004. Its composition and arrangements were praised by critics. In late 2005, Quinteros released his second album, Leo Quinteros, Ahora! (Leo Quinteros, Now!), whose single Fiesta Pagada (Paid Party) moved rapidly up radio playlists. Some of the album's live tracks featured Gonzalo Planet (Matorral) on bass and Álvaro Gomez (Guiso and Perrosky) on drums.

Quinteros' third album, Los Accidentes del Futuro (The Accidents of the Future, 2007)featured international collaborations with the drummer Christian Sotomayor, based in Paris, France, and the producer Mowat, based in Leipzig, Germany, who recorded the string arrangements for the track La Enredader (The Creeper).

The fourth album Los Dias Santos (The Holy Days), was released in 2010 in a digital format, available only as a download from iTunes and Chilean website Portal Disc. In the words of Quinteros, quoted in super45.net: "As a generation, we have the ability to edit content as often as we want [...] There's no point in making an idiot of yourself and going back to the idea of the LP that they had in the 60s". The album was produced by Quinteros, Felipe Cadenasso and Antonio del Fávero and was mastered at Abbey Road Studios.

Quinteros also featured on the debut album of Chilean band Alamedas, Alamedas, in 2004.

== Discography ==
Original Albums

- 2002 – Fallando
- 2004 – 1A
- 2006 – Leo Quinteros, Ahora!
- 2007 – Los Accidentes del Futuro
- 2010 – Los Días Santos

=== Compilations ===
- 2006 – Primeros Álbumes
- 2012 – Doble Plus Bueno

=== Collaborations ===
- 2008 – Almácigo. Musicalización de los poemas inéditos de Gabriela
- 2009 – Primer almuerzo: sesiones para Radio Guerritas 2009
- 2009 – Rumos
- 2011 – Música x memoria
