= Gondwana (band) =

Chilean reggae group

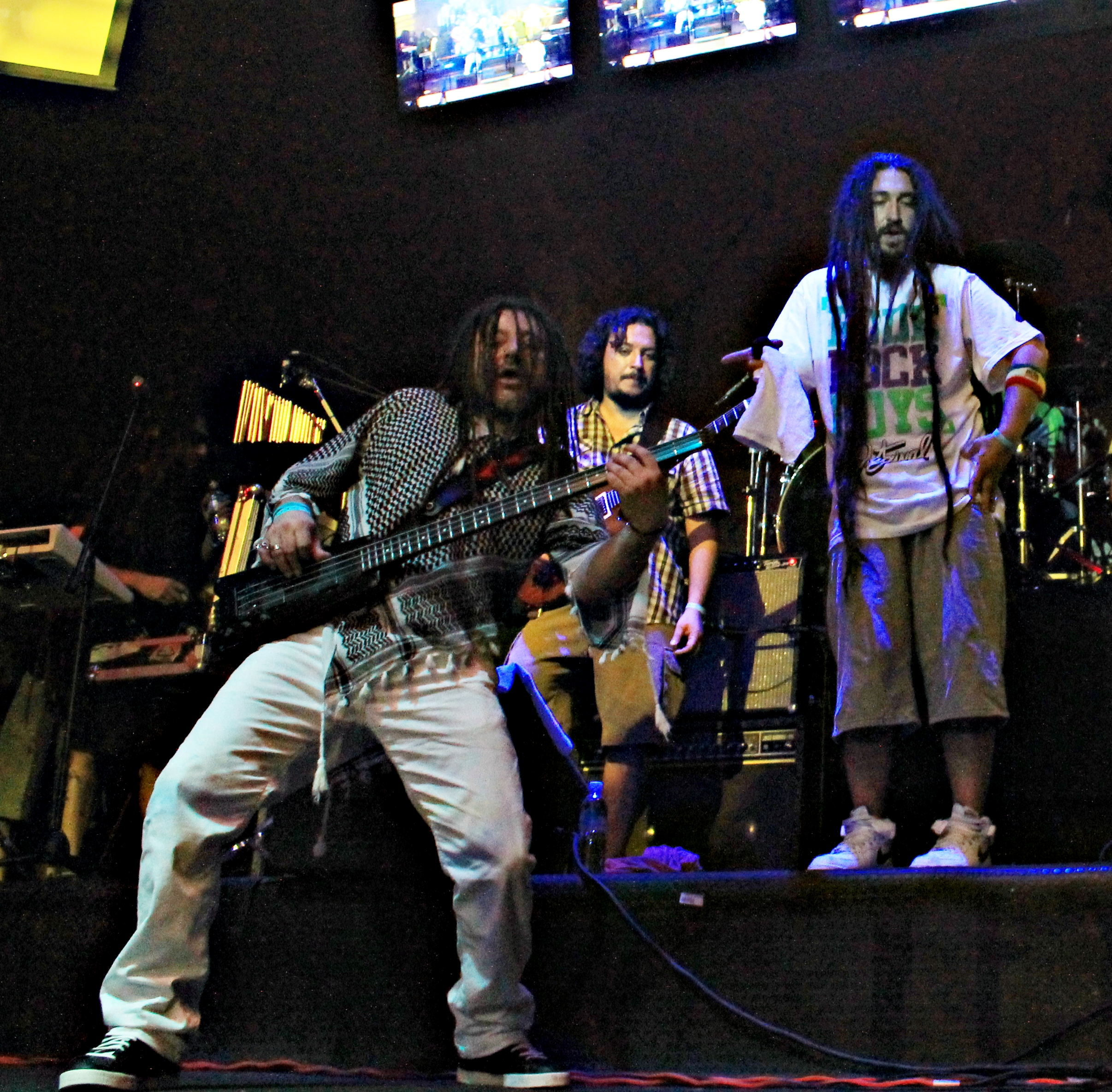
Gondwana in the late 90's

Gondwana is a reggae group from La Pincoya, Santiago, Chile, founded in 1987 by I-Locks Labbé. They have been produced by Dr. Dread of RAS Records. With their charismatic leader Quique Neira, they found success in Chile and abroad, as the band played shows in Jamaica and the United States, cradles of reggae.

== Discography ==
- Gondwana (1997)
- Alabanza (Por la Fuerza de la Razón) or Second Coming (2000)
- Made in Jamaica (2002)
- Crece (2005)
- Resiliente (2007)
- En Vivo en Buenos Aires (CD/DVD) (2010)
- Revolución (2011)
- Reggae and Roll (2014)
- Carpe Diem (2017)
