= Sinergia =

Chilean metal band

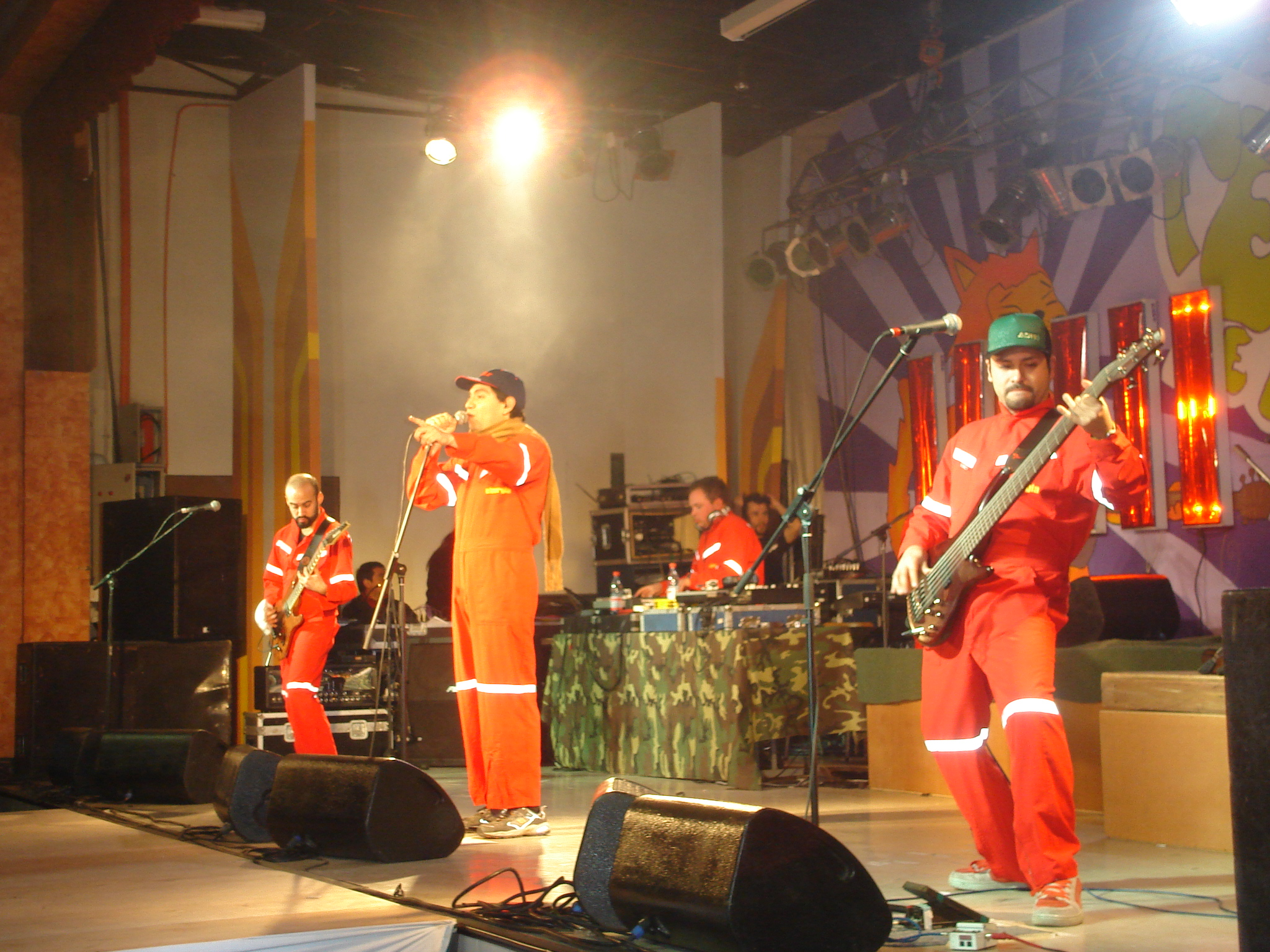

Background information
- Origin: Santiago, Chile
- Genres: Alternative metal; experimental rock; comedy rock; cumbia; ska; funk metal; nu metal (early)
- Years active: 1992–present
- Labels: Oveja Negra (2000–2013); CHV Música (2014–present)
- Members: Don Rorro; Pedrales; Arielarko; DJ Panoramix; DJ Humitas; Brunanza
- Past members: Aneres; Luis Silva
- Website: http://www.sinergia.cl/

Sinergia (Spanish for Synergy) is a Chilean band that plays experimental rock with influences from alternative metal, a style that themselves define as "bird metal" by the incorporation of "pajaronas" (birdy) lyrics; which is Chilean slang referring to people that are a bit vague or slow to understand. Sinergia mixes a strong rock sound with an electronic bass, funk bass lines, and special sounds for each song.

The band is known for mixing genres into unusual combinations. For example, Jefe contains elements of both ska and alternative metal. Their lyrics (sung in Chilean Spanish) focus on common elements of daily life and often take on a comedic or irreverent tone. Their songs have covered topics such as how to love a chubby woman, trying to win a contest, and personal relationships one has with a spouse or a boss.

== History ==
Sinergia was formed in 1994, when they began composing their own songs inspired by groups like The Beatles, Faith No More, Primus, Mr. Bungle, etc. The following year they participated in the Escuelas de Rock (Rock Schools) project of the Asociación de Trabajadores del Rock (Rock Workers Association), led by Claudio Narea (former member of Los Prisioneros), in which he would subsequently participate in 1997.

In 1998 they recorded a demo called "Apoyando la Demencia" (Supporting Dementia), and "Chupatrón" which talks about a disturbed man who seeks to be known.

After a recess they consolidated with the current line-up, releasing their eponymous album, Sinergia, in 2001 with which they attempted to be recognized as an innovative band, as much for their lyrics as for their music with songs and respective videos such as "Mujer Robusta" (Sturdy Woman), "Concurso" (Contest) or "Chile Robot", which even appeared on the MTV television channel.

After the relative success in Chile with the album Sinergia, the band dedicated itself to mix more themes in 2004 with a view to what would be their album called "Procésalo Todo" (Process It All), which includes the hit "Mi Señora" (My Wife), which many couples identified with by the fact that the song talks about a woman who changes from a dedicated wife to a partying woman.

In 2005 they released a tribute EP Canciones De Cuando Éramos Colegiales,(Songs When We Were Students) their versions of songs that influenced the adolescent stage of the band members, highlighting "Síndrome Camboya" by the Chilean punk band Los Peores de Chile, "Somos Tontos no Pesados" of Los Tres and "Calibraciones" from the band Aparato Raro.

The band's fifth album, Delirio (Delirium), was released in 2007. The track "Te Enojai' Por Todo" (You Get Mad About Everything) is dedicated to women, and talks about a couple where the woman is enraged by the countless activities of her husband. The music video for "Te Enojai' Por Todo" was voted the best video of the year in Chile.

On August 10, 2007, they celebrated their thirteen-year career with a recital at the Teatro Teleton, where they also recorded their first DVD entitled "Imperdible". On February 21, 2008, the band participated in the XLIX International Song Festival of Viña del Mar, the same day as Journey and the Chilean comedian Stefan Kramer. The band received three honors awarded by the public: The Silver Torch, The Golden Torch and The Silver Gull.

On April 11, 2008, in the Altazor Awards, they received the "Best Rock Band of the Year" Award thanks to their album Delirio, beating out groups like Fiskales Ad-Hok and Matorral.

Their sixth album called El Imperio De La Estupidez (Stupidity's Empire). It was released in September 2009, and contains 11 songs and four videos, including "Hágalo Bien" (Make It Right).

The bassist, Alexis "Aneres" Gonzalez announced he was leaving the group to follow academic work abroad. The role of new bassist was taken by his brother, Pedro Ariel "Arielarko" Gonzalez, who had replaced his brother on other occasions.

"Vamos Con Todo" (released in November 2010) is an EP of 7 songs that deal with the New Wave of the 1960s. This album promoted two videoclips, "Mucho Amor", and "Modesto". A new disc was expected in 2011

On June 22, 2014, Sinergia, along with other Chilean bands, signed a contract with the record label, CHV Música, that belongs to Chilevisión, after the closing of their previous record label Oveja Negra.

On July 1, 2014, the band confirmed on their Facebook page, all the 22 songs (and the back cover) that will be in their first compilation album that will come out later in the year. Named "22 Exitos Pajarones", it would contain all their greatest hits to date.

== Current members ==
=== Rodrigo Osorio ===
Born on July 28, 1971, in Santiago, Chile. He is a Chilean singer and band leader, his pseudonym is "Don Rorro". Among his influences could be mentioned Primus, Faith No More, Los Jaivas and Mauricio Redolés. He has a son named Tomás Osorio, who did vocals on Sinergia's album, "Delirio" (Delirium) in the song "Tanto Delirio" (So Much Delirium).

=== Pedro "Pedrale" Lopez Figueroa ===
Born on March 31, 1972. He is the guitarist of the band. Among his influences are included several bands such as Faith No More, Rage Against the Machine, Led Zeppelin, Metallica, Red Hot Chili Peppers, Pantera, Stone Temple Pilots, Mr. Bungle, Radiohead, Blur, Van Halen, Mötley Crüe, Jimi Hendrix, Frank Sinatra, Lucybell and Cafe Tacuba. He was the general producer of the latest studio album by Sinergia, "Delirio". He does vocals occasionally and this duty is increasing with the passage of time.

=== Bruno "Brunanza" Godoy ===
Born on April 14, 1974, Bruno Godoy is the band's drummer.

=== Paul "DJ Panoramix" Eberhard ===
Paul Eberhard is in charge of turntables and samples and also plays percussion live. He is part of the original formation of the band.

=== Jaime Andrés Garcia Silva ===
Jaime Andrés Garcia Silva, better known as "Humitas", was born on November 2, 1975. Silva is the current DJ of the band, dealing with turntables and keyboards as well as singing backing vocals live. He is influenced by Michael Jackson, Faith No More, DJ Vadim, DJ Krush, Devo, The Beatles, Cypress Hill and Mike Laure.

=== Pedro Ariel "Arielarko" Gonzalez ===
Pedro Gonzalez is Aneres' brother, and is the one who took over as the new bassist after the departure of his brother. Before joining the band he occasionally played live in the band, alongside his brother. He is the youngest member of the band.

== Past members ==
=== Alexis "Aneres" Gonzalez Parra ===
Born on February 20, 1973. He was the original bassist of the band. His skills with the bass are one of the things that gave distinction to Sinergia over other bands in the Chilean public eye and he freely used the technique of slap to make riffs in the songs. Among his influences are The Beatles, Primus, Faith No More, Pantera, 311 and Level 42. He left the band because his work took him to the United States.

=== Luis Silva ===
Luis Silva was the original drummer of the band. Silva left the band in the early days because he was going to become a father. His departure forced the band into a hiatus until they found a new drummer.

== Discography ==
=== Demos ===
- Apoyando La Demencia (1998)

=== Studio albums ===
- Sinergia (2001)
- Procésalo Todo (2004)
- Delirio (2007)
- El Imperio De La Estupidez (2009)
- Aquí Nadie Debería Ser Pobre (2012)
- La Hora de la Verdad (2017)
- Sinergia Kids Game (2018)

=== EPs and Singles ===
- Canciones De Cuando Éramos Colegiales (2005)
- Vamos Con Todo (2010)
- Vacilón Pajarón (2016)
- Rebelión del Rock (2021)
- Alienígenas (2024)
- Te Amodio (2025)

=== Compilation album(s) ===
- 22 Éxitos Pajarones (2014)

== Awards ==
- The Golden Copihue (Best Band)
- Festival of Viña del Mar 2008:
  - Silver Torch
  - Golden Torch
  - Silver Seagull
- Altazor Award 2008 (Best Rock Band)
- Altazor Award 2010 (Best Rock Band)
