= TenTemPiés =

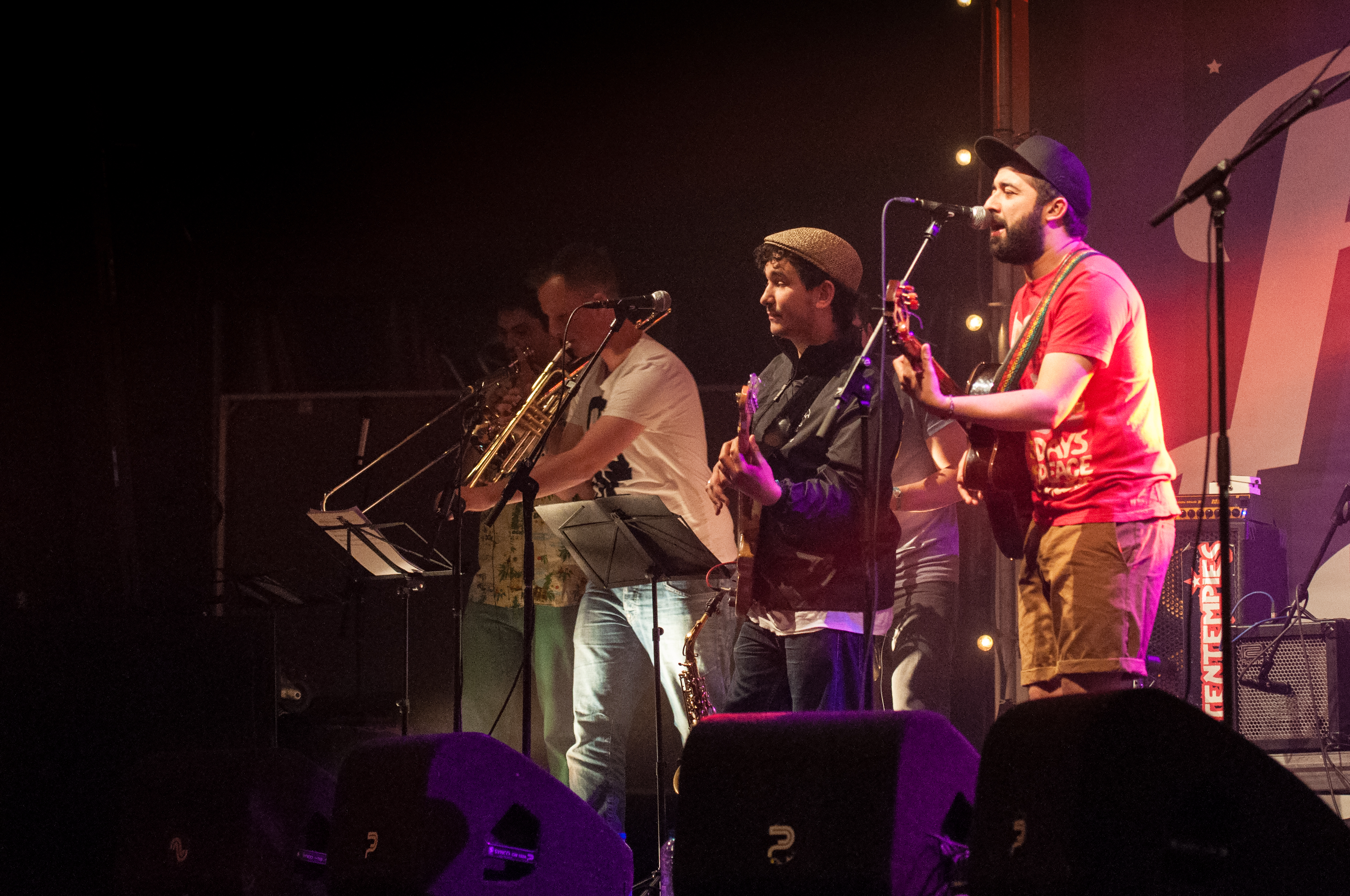

Background information
- Origin: Amsterdam, Netherlands
- Genres: Latin rock, Ska, Reggae, Reggae rock, Latin Alternative
- Label: Patiperro Records
- Members: Maurino Alarcón; Jouke Schwarz; Nathan Klumperbeek; Remco Menting; Miguel Padron; Marc ManGin; Matias Varela; Julius Kaufmann

TenTemPiés is an international collective of musicians based in Amsterdam, Netherlands. Formed during the summer of 2008, their music is an energetic blend of Latin rock with ska and reggae.

== Discography ==
=== Albums ===
- A Mi Propio Paso (2017)
- Rebelucionario (Patiperro Records / PIAS Rough Trade, 2014)
- Canto Para Gritar (Patiperro Records, 2011)

=== EP's ===
- A Casa Tierra (Patiperro Records, 2013)
- Por Ahora (Patiperro Records, 2010)
- TenTemPiés (Patiperro Records, 2009)

=== Singles ===
- Dame Tu Mano (Patiperro Records / PIAS Rough Trade, 2014)
- Quiero Saltar (Patiperro Records, 2014)
- Nada Te Pido (Patiperro Records, 2013)
- Que Sera (Patiperro Records, 2012)
- Leon (Patiperro Records, 2011)
