= Audiovisión =

Studio album by Gepe
- Released: September 7, 2010
- Genres: Indie pop, indie folk
- Length: 38:43
- Labels: Quemasucabeza; Feria Music; 257726
- Producers: Cristian Heyne; Gepe

Gepe chronology
Las Piedras (2008)	Audiovisión (2010)	GP (2012)

Singles from Audiovisión
- 1. "Por La Ventana" Released: 2010; 2. "Un Día Ayer" Released: 2010; 3. "Alfabeto" Released: 2011; 4. "12 Minerales" Released: 2011

Audiovisión is the third studio album of the Chilean singer-songwriter Gepe. It was released on September 7, 2010, both in CD and vinyl. This album was nominated in the Premios Altazor for Best Artist Pop.

== Track listing ==
Audiovisión
No.	Title	Principal vocalist	Length
1.	"Amigos vecinos" (Neighboring Friends)	Gepe	1:49
2.	"Por la ventana" (Through the Window)	Gepe	3:13
3.	"12 minerales" (12 Minerals)	Gepe	3:33
4.	"Alfabeto" (Alphabet)	Gepe	4:08
5.	"Ayelén"	Gepe	3:07
6.	"Estado de vista" (View State)	Gepe	2:42
7.	"Lienza" (Lienz)	Gepe and Javiera Mena	3:52
8.	"Salón Nacional de Tecnología" (National Technology Show)	Gepe and Jorge González	3:37
9.	"Un día ayer" (A Day Yesterday)	Gepe	4:10
10.	"Victoria Roma"	Gepe and Valeria Jara	2:51
11.	"La bajada" (The Descent)	Gepe	2:34
12.	"Budapest"	Gepe	3:06
