= Tiro de Gracia =

Chilean hip-hop group

- Origin: Santiago, Chile
- Genre: Latin hip hop
- Years active: 1993–2007; 2007–2019; 2020–2022; 2023–present
- Label: EMI Odeon
- Members: Juan Sativo
- Past members: Lenwa Dura; Zaturno; Adonai; DJ Raff; Explícito; Camilo Cintolesi; DJ Borna; DJ Mataskaupas

Tiro de Gracia is a Chilean hip hop group. Their album Ser hümano!! (1997) achieved great success in Latin America and contributed to the development of the hip hop movement in Chile.

The band was initially formed in 1993 in Santiago, Chile by Juan Sativo, Lenwa Dura, Explícito, and DJ Borna. Explícito and DJ Borna later left the group and were replaced by Zaturno, Camilo Cintolesi, and Patricio "Adonai" Loaiza, establishing what would become the band's most recognized lineup.

== Biography ==
Known for their raw lyrical style, the group initially performed using cassette tapes looped by DJ Raff, former member of La Pozze Latina. During this time, they recorded two independent albums titled Arma Calibrada and Homosapiens, which were distributed by hand on the local hip hop scene. Tiro de Gracia started getting notoriety for their live performances, and at the beginning of 1996, the group was featured on a hip hop TV show, which opened up the doors for their first major deal. Within six months, the group had a new demo titled El Demo Final with a lineup of Juan Sativo, Lenwa Dura, Zaturno, Adonai and Camilo, also featuring artists such as Quique Neira, Joe Vasconcellos, Los Tetas, Carlos Cabezas, Ema Pinto, Pedro Foncea, DJ Notsag and DJ Barsa. The demo was presented to EMI Music Group, and by November, the group had signed their first major deal.

Ser humano, their debut album, was released in 1997, after three months of recording. Thanks to its hit "El Juego Verdadero" ("The real game"), they first gained mainstream popularity in Chile, despite other songs, such as "Viaje Sin Rumbo", "Melaza" and "Chupacabras", also finding minor success.

The group split briefly in 2007 before returning in the same year, and then again in 2019 after an argument between founding members Juan Sativo and Lenwa Dura.

== Discography ==
=== Studio albums ===
- Ser humano!! (1997)
- Decisión (1999)
- Retorno de Misericordia (2001)
- Patrón del Vicio (2003)

=== Compilations ===
- Impacto Certero (2004)

=== Demos ===
- Arma Calibrada (1994)
- Homosapiens (1994)
