= Natalia Contesse =

Chilean folk musician and historian

- Birth name: Natalia Contesse Bamon
- Born: June 21, 1978 (age 47); New Orleans, United States
- Origin: Chile
- Genres: Folk, Experimental
- Instrument(s): Vocals, guitar
- Years active: 2002–present
- Website: http://www.nataliacontesse.cl/

Natalia Contesse Bamon (born June 21, 1978, in New Orleans) is a Chilean folk musician and historian. She began her musical career in 2002 in Santiago, Chile, and throughout her career has sought to integrate Chilean folk music traditions into her work. Contesse is also involved with the Escuela Chilena de Folclor y Oficios (Chilean School of Folklore and Crafts), an institute located in the same place as Violeta Parra's Peña which aims to continue Parra's vision for Chilean music and culture.

== Biography ==
Born in New Orleans in 1978, Natalia returned to Chile at a young age. In 2002, she began performing with groups such as Los Obreros del Ritmo and Detucunaatutumba. It was in this year too that she attended a workshop by Chilean folk singer-songwriter Manuel Sánchez, beginning an interest in traditional Chilean music.'

Between 2006 and 2009, Contesse fronted the folk group Vena Raíz, a group with Andean, Afro-Peruvian, Mapuche and Cueca influences.

In 2011, Contesse released her first solo album, "Puñado de Tierra" (English: "Handful of Earth"), after having won a national competition to create an album under the Sello Azul label run every two years. For one single from the album, Décimas al Agua, Contesse sings accompanied by only the guitar (a style popularised by Violeta Parra), asking that water continue to bless the Chilean landscape. She considered this song a "prayer so that there is water for seven generations more".

Contesse also opened a cycle of "surprise" concerts held in the Santiago Metro in 2011.

In 2013, Contesse released her second album, "Corra la Voz" (English: "Spread the Word"), which incorporated woodwind instruments.

She continues to perform throughout Chile, including as part of music festivals such as the Valparaíso Rock Carnaza Festival. Contesse has said that her aim when on stage is "to be there for the people".

Alongside her musical career, Contesse is also involved with the Escuela Chilena de Folclor y Oficios (Chilean School of Folklore and Crafts). The school is situated in the municipality of La Reina, Santiago, at the same place where Violeta Parra erected her Peña to host performances by musicians of traditional Chilean music. It aims to continue Parra's dream, to research, create and diffuse Chilean cultural traditions.

== Discography ==
- Vena Raíz (2008; self-titled album of her then band)
- Puñado de Tierra (2011)
- Corra la Voz (2013)
- Diluvio (2017)
