= Cachureos =

Chilean television program

- Created by: Marcelo Hernández
- Starring: Marcelo Hernández
- Country of origin: Chile

Production
- Running time: 60:00

Original release
- Network: TVN (1983–1998); Canal 13 (1998–2002); Red TV (2005–2008)
- Release: 1983

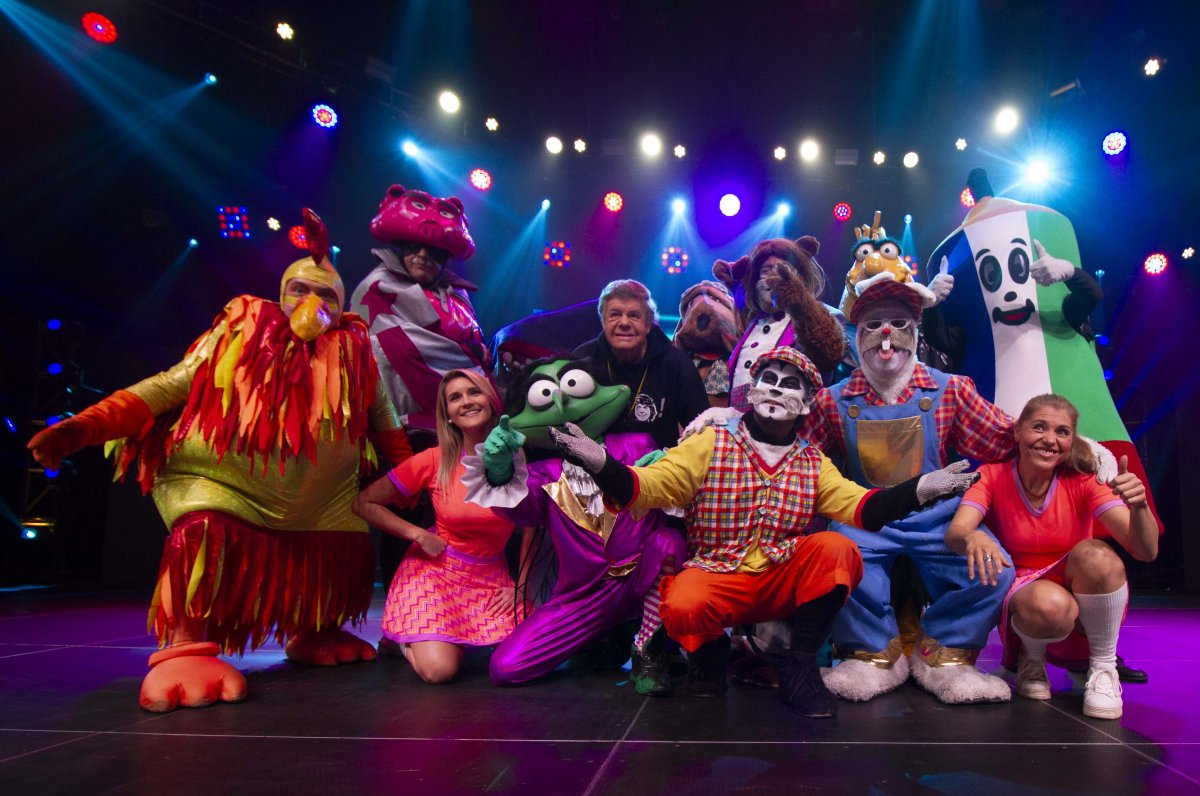
People dressed as characters from Cachureos

Cachureos (Chilean Spanish for odds and ends) was a Chilean television program created in 1983 by Marcelo Hernández.

== Show ==
Cachureos is like a game show where the host, "Tío Marcelo", gives prizes to the kids who win the competitions. Tío Marcelo interacted with people in animal costumes who entertained the children. Marcelo was known for his catchphrase which he would exclaim to the children, "¡El grito, el grito, el grito!" (Spanish for "The scream, the scream, the scream!").

== Broadcast ==
The show was transmitted by TVN between 1983 and 1998, and became very successful. That same year, 1998, the show was purchased by Canal 13 but the program's run only lasted four years on the channel due to economic problems.

After a three-year hiatus the show was broadcast by Red TV.

== Characters ==
- Tío Marcelo (Marcelo Hernández): The program's host.
- Gato Juanito: A black cat with a white face.
- Epidemia: A bacterium who loves dirt.
- Wenceslao: A rabbit with glasses.
- Chester: An old lion who is very smart.
- Señor Lápiz: A pencil who communicates with gestures.
- Señor Oso: A panda bear of big size.
- Chanchoman: A pig. The show's antagonist. The kids must defeat him in a force test.
- La Mosca: A fly. Chanchoman wants to kill her.
- El Zancudo Draculón: A green mosquito, who sucks blood and is a reference to Count Dracula.
- Don Walo: An overweight man.
- El Tiburón: A shark. He eats the children who lose the contests. Inspired by Steven Spielberg's Jaws.
- El Pollo: A yellow chicken.
- El Glotón: Another villain who is a monster that lives in a sewer.
- El Piojo y la Pulga: A louse and a flea in love.
- El Manguera: A green hose who sings cueca.
- Murci: A superhero, parodies Batman.
- Robot Tuerca: Inspired by RoboCop.
- Frescolin: A penguin.
