= Gepe =

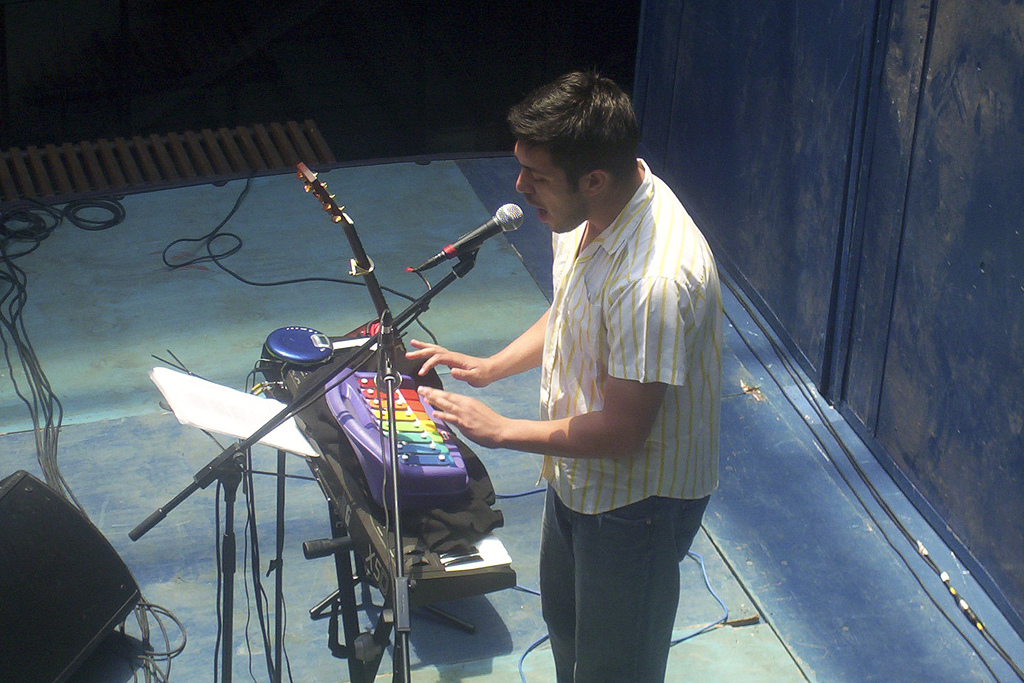

Background information
- Born: Daniel Alejandro Riveros Sepúlveda; September 28, 1981 (age 44)
- Origin: San Miguel, Santiago, Chile
- Genres: Pop, folk, electropop, indie folk
- Instruments: Vocals, guitar, keyboards, drums
- Years active: 2001–present
- Labels: Jacobino Discos; Quemasucabeza; Sony Music

Daniel Alejandro Riveros Sepúlveda (born September 28, 1981), known as Gepe, is a Chilean singer-songwriter and multi-instrumentalist. He has released five solo albums in addition to one album as a member of the band Taller Dejao. He has been described as the "new 'guru' of Chilean folk" for combining the sensibilities of 1960s and 1970s Chilean folk (especially the music of Víctor Jara) with a minimalist, electropop sound.

== Biography ==
Gepe was born in San Miguel, a commune of Santiago, Chile. Then he studied graphical design at the Pontifical Catholic University of Chile.

=== Taller Dejao ===
Taller Dejao, consisting of Gepe on drums and vocals and Javier Cruz on bass, released an album entitled El brillo que tiene es lo humano que le queda in 2004.

=== Solo ===
Gepe released his first solo recording, the EP 5x5, on Jacobino Discos in 2004. On November 4, 2005, he released his first full-length album, Gepinto, on the Chilean label Quemasucabeza. The same year, a track from the album, "Namás," was included on the Chilean indie compilation and label sampler Panorama neutral. Gepe also contributed to electropop artist Javiera Mena's track, "Sol de invierno," on the compilation. The Chilean edition of Rolling Stone voted Gepinto the 22nd best Chilean album of all time in its April 2008 issue, and the Argentinean edition of the same magazine selected "Namás" as the 49th best track of 2006.

Gepe's second full-length album, Hungría, was released by Quemasucabeza on May 18, 2007, at Cine Arte Normandie in Santiago, Chile. The same year, he was awarded "best new artist" at the Premios a la Música Chilena, and filmmakers Rosario González y Pablo Muñoz released an independent documentary about Gepe and Javiera Mena.

In 2008, Gepe released a second EP, Las piedras, available free for download from the label Quemasucabeza's website.

In 2009, Gepe could be heard in a beautiful Spanish cover of Leonard Cohen's "Hallelujah," specially recorded for the film "Sugar." Gepe's Hallelujah remains unavailable for purchase and can only be heard in the film (prominently featured towards the end) and on Gepe's MySpace webpage.

In 2012, Gepe released his fourth album entitled GP. The album was heavily influenced by Chile's northern and Bolivian music, and also went more in a Pop-oriented direction. When performing live he also started to be accompanied by a dance crew for the first time.

== Influences ==
Gepe's influences range from Chilean nueva canción artist Víctor Jara to Brian Wilson, Sonic Youth, My Bloody Valentine, Animal Collective, Pet Shop Boys, and Devendra Banhart.

== Performances ==
Gepe regularly holds live performances at venues and festivals in Santiago and other major Chilean cities, such as Viña del Mar. In addition, he toured Europe in 2006, Argentina and Mexico (with Javiera Mena and Mostro) in mid-2007, and Spain in late 2007.

In February 2009, Gepe toured the United States for the first time. He performed at three concerts in New York City, including one at the Americas Society.

== Personal life ==
Gepe is a supporter for the Hare Krishna movement and he tried to convert to it, but he gave up for his difficulty to maintain a vegetarian diet.

== Discography ==
=== Solo albums ===
- 2004 – 5x5 (EP) (Jacobino Discos)
- 2005 – Gepinto (Quemasucabeza; released in Spain by Astro Discos and distributed in the United States by Darla Records)
- 2007 – Hungría (Quemasucabeza; released in Spain by Factoría Autor)
- 2008 – Las Piedras EP
- 2010 – Audiovisión
- 2012 – GP
- 2015 – Estilo Libre
- 2017 – Ciencia Exacta
- 2018 – Folclor Imaginario
- 2020 - Ulyse

=== With Taller Dejao ===
- 2002 – El brillo que tiene es lo humano que le queda

=== With Alex Anwandter ===
- 2013 – Álex y Daniel

=== Soundtracks ===
- 2009 – Sugar (Soundtrack) – Gepe's contribution: "Hallelujah (Spanish version)"
