= Makiza =

Chilean hip hop group

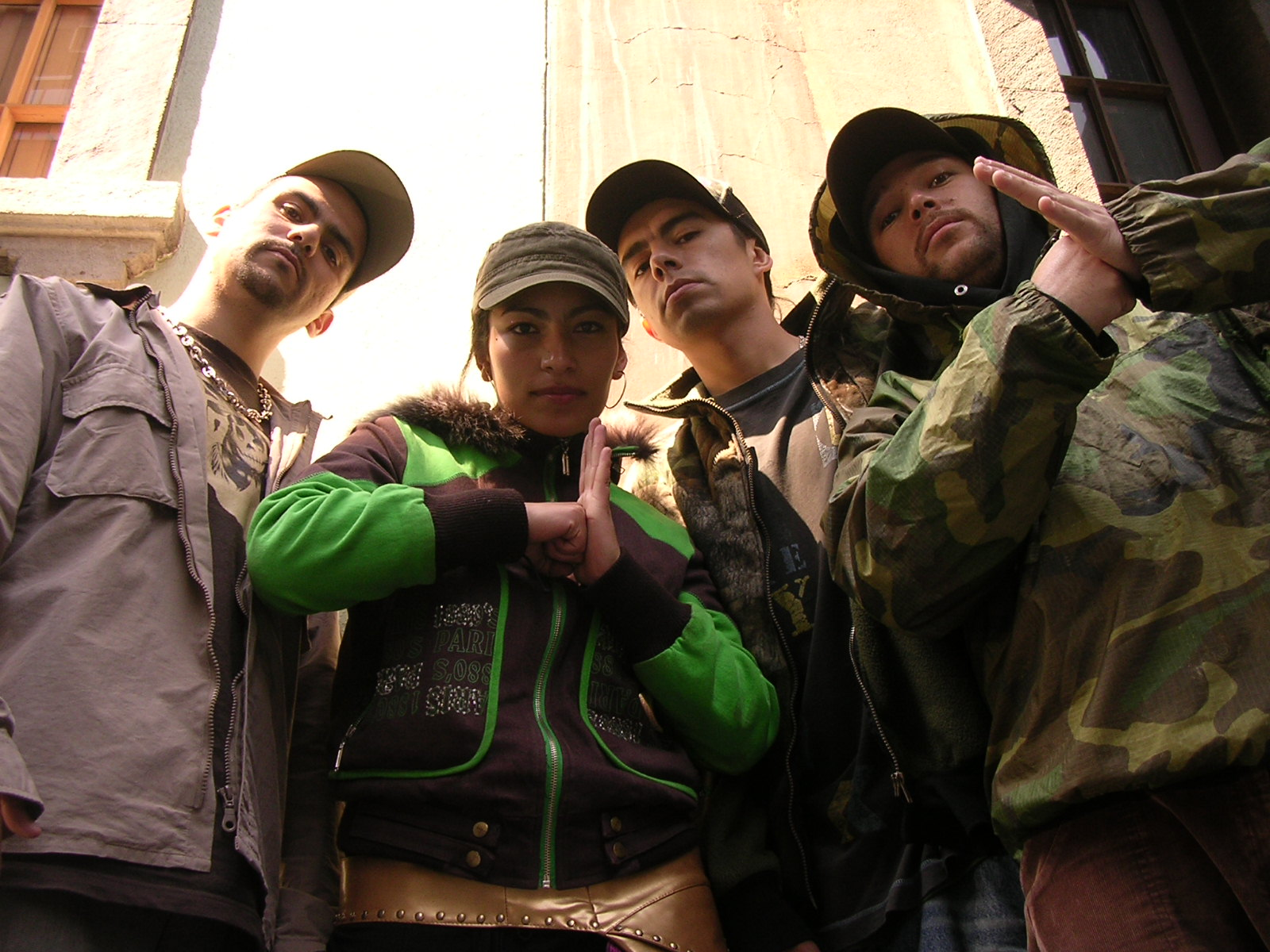
- Makiza in 2005. From left to right: Seo2, Ana Tijoux, Sonido Ácido and DJ Nakeye

Background information
- Origin: Santiago, Chile
- Genre: Hip-hop
- Years active: 1997-2000; 2004–2006
- Labels: Sony Music; Aguasonica Producciones; La Oreja
- Past members: Seo2; Ana Tijoux; Cenzi; DJ Squat; Sonido Ácido; DJ Nakeye

Makiza was a Chilean hip hop group formed in 1997. The group’s music was known for its political and social criticism, with their lyrics often attacking the military dictatorship of Chile. Before breaking up in 2006, the group was one of the most successful hip hop acts in Chile.

== History ==
In 1999, Makiza released "Aerolineas Makiza" on Sony Music Entertainment, who became interested in Chilean rap as a result of Tiro de Gracia, a bestselling Chilean rap group. Makiza's album included new and improved versions of songs from "Vida Salvaje" with two new songs, one of which was the hit single "La Rosa de los Vientos". This album put Makiza at the top of the Latin American hip-hop market, as their style was much more evolved than other groups at the time. The production style resembled the New York underground sound inspired by the Native Tongues, and the lyrics of Makiza lacked the overwhelming "machismo" and violence of average rap. This helped the group receive approval from a wider population.

In 2000, Makiza covered the popular song "Somos tontos, no pesados" by Los Tres. At the end of that year, the members of Makiza separated due to its members' desire to work on personal projects before their tour through neighboring countries. Tijoux specified that she would be abandoning hip-hop and her music career.

In 2001, Tijoux collaborated with a popular band, Barrio Santo, on "La persecución" and "La bienvenida". She returned to France shortly thereafter, until 2004, and recorded her first solo track, "Santiago Penando Estas" for the tribute album for Violeta Parra entitled "Después Vivir un Siglo", which was highly popular in both Chile and France.

Reunion concert flyer (2004)

In 2003, Tijoux returned to Chile and worked on musical projects with Aluzinati, a Chilean funk band. She also recorded "Lo Que Tu Me Das" with Mexican singer Julieta Venegas for the soundtrack to the film "Subterra", and appeared as a featured artist on Mexican hip-hop group Control Machete's final album Uno, Dos: Bandera.

In 2004, Makiza came back together and announced a tour to promote the re-release of Vida Salvaje, which was remastered and in CD format. Tijoux and Seo2, the only musically active remaining members of the group, decided to reunite the band and work on new material. The group released its third album in 2005, "Casino Royale", under the independent label Bizarre Records. The album involved various producers, of which the following stand out: Cenzi, Erasmo de la Parra, DJ Raff & DJ Who and involved a third Chilean MC, Sonido Ácido. During this time, Tijoux also voiced "Nea" in the animated series "Pulentos".

In 2006, the group broke up permanently due to differences in beliefs about musical production and direction.

== Discography ==
- Vida Salvaje (Independent, 1998)
- Aerolíneas Makiza (Sony Music, 1999)
- Vida Salvaje (Remasterizado) (Aguasonica Producciones, 2004)
- Casino Royale (La Oreja, 2005)
