= Los Tetas =

Chilean funk band

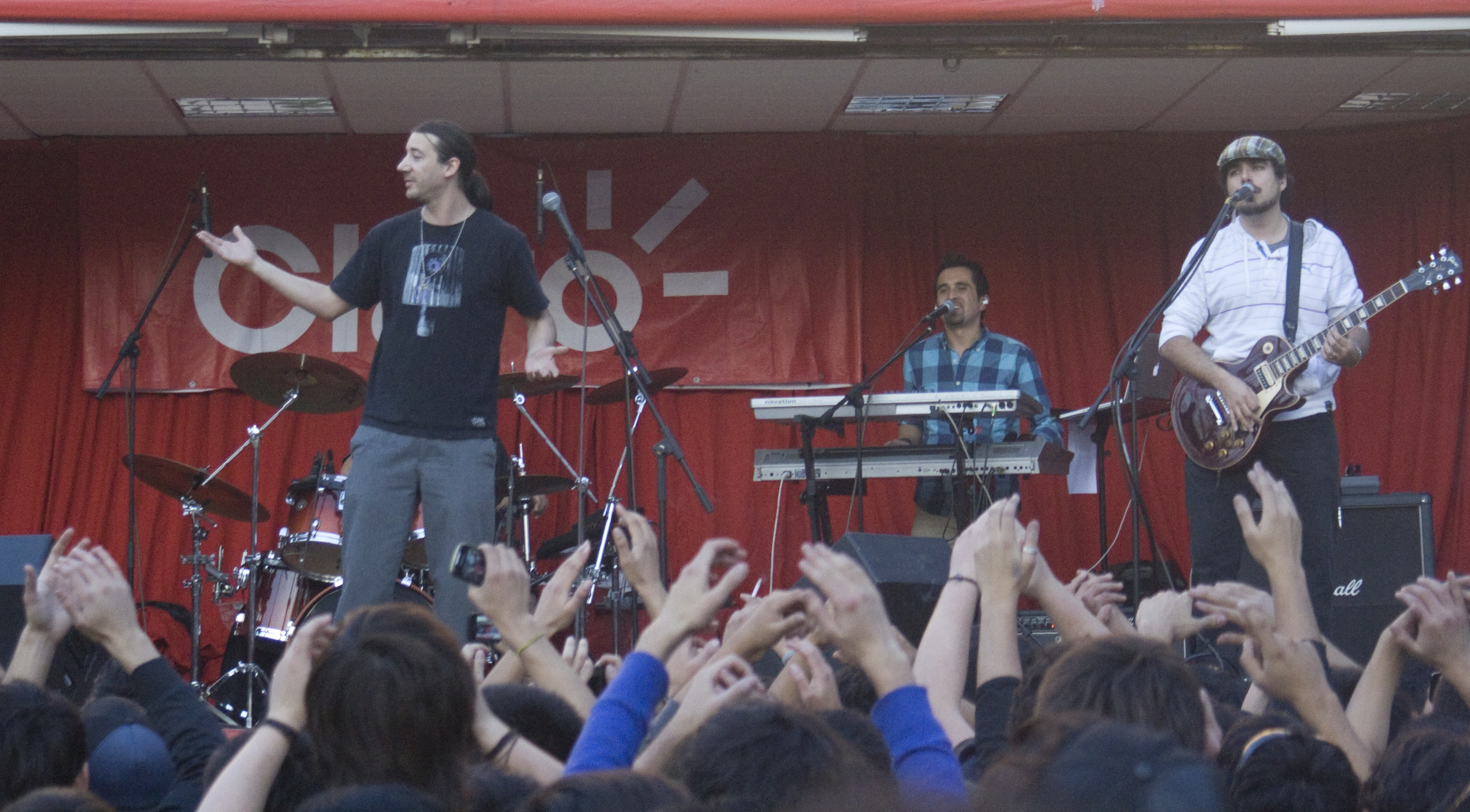
- Los Tetas performing live in 2011

Background information
- Origin: Chile
- Genres: Funk rap, Rap rock, Soul, Hip Hop
- Years active: 1994–2004; 2011–present
- Labels: EMI, Plaza Independencia
- Members: Cristian Moraga (C-Funk); David Eidelstein (Rulo); Francisco González (Pepino); Felipe "Felo" Foncea; Max Reyes
- Past members: Camilo Castaldi (Tea-Time)

Los Tetas is a Chilean funk band formed in 1994 by four musicians: Pepino (drums), Rulo (bass), C-Funk (Guitar, keyboard and vocals) and Tea Time (scratch and vocals).

The group's first single, "Corazón de Sandía", was a summer hit from their first album "Mama Funk", which comprised sixteen songs and was released in 1995 under the EMI label. The album sold over 15,000 units and was Gold-certified. Two years later a second big hit "Cha cha cha" was released as a single, featuring Juan Sativo, a rap artist from Chilean band Tiro de Gracia. Also in 1997 another album with fifteen songs, called "La Medicina", was released under the EMI Odeon label. This album is recognized by a number of Latin artists as one of the best Latin-American funk works ever.

Los Tetas introduced a new member "Tata", who eventually took the place of Pepino on drums, but also made a big impact on vocals and musical adjustments. Before taking "Pepino's" place, "Tata" performs on several percussion arrangements with "Los Tetas". Bringing the participation of several artists from their local scene, such as Boomer (DJ and Raggamuffin), Zaturno and Juan Sativo from Tiro de Gracia and Anita Tijoux from Makiza, they made a solid and fun album with big influences from James Brown and Parliament Funkadelic. Among the songs recorded in this period were "Papi... donde esta el Funk", "Bola Disco", "La Medicina", "James Brown" and "Primavera".

In 1998 after some disagreements within the band, they dissolved, to reunite again in 1999 with a new formation: Tata (drums), Toly Ramirez Jr. (Bass), C-Funk (Guitar, keyboard and vocals) and Tea Time (scratch and vocals). With this band, they made their fourth album, "Independiente" containing ten songs. This album was edited and distributed by CAPITALUX Discos label. It wasn't as big a success as former albums, but they survive in the local scene with a lot of live gigs. They also made the transition to the north and begin to make some contacts to work in Mexico and USA.

In late 2002 their last album "Tómala!", with 14 songs (including "I like", "Pico Parado", "Fiesta Funk", "Underground side", "Bisex" and "Sistemas"), propelled the band to jump to a lot of countries in Latin America, including Argentina, Peru, Bolivia, Colombia, Venezuela and especially Mexico, where they found their most success. They also started performing in the USA. Later they shared the stage with Red Hot Chili Peppers in a concert at the Chilean Estadio Nacional.

In 2004 they dissolved once again, after one of the co-founder members C-Funk, decided to make the transition to a solo career. The remaining artists of the band changed the name to T-Funk and a few months after to FunkAttack, where they were joined by a new guitarist, Pancho Guitarra.

In 2011, after 7 years of being apart, they decided to reunite with their original members: Tea Time (Vocals), C-funk (Guitar), Rulo (Bass), and Pepino (Drums). In an interview given to the Chilean newspaper"La Tercera", they claim to have overcome their differences and furthermore confess to have been unsuccessful at pursuing solo careers. They were preparing a concert in Chile for December 2011.

== Discography ==
=== Studio albums ===
- 1995 – Mama funk (mom funk) (EMI Odeon)
- 1998 – La medicina (Medicine) (EMI Odeon)
- 2000 – Independiente (Independent) (Autoedición)
- 2002 – Tómala! (Take it!) (Autoedición)

=== Compilations and live albums ===
- 1997 – Cha, cha, cha (EMI Odeon)
- 2000 – Independiente 2 (Independent 2) (Autoedición)
- 2000 – Latin funk all-stars (EMI Odeon)
- 2012 – El Movimiento (The movement) (Autoedición)
