= Electrodomésticos =

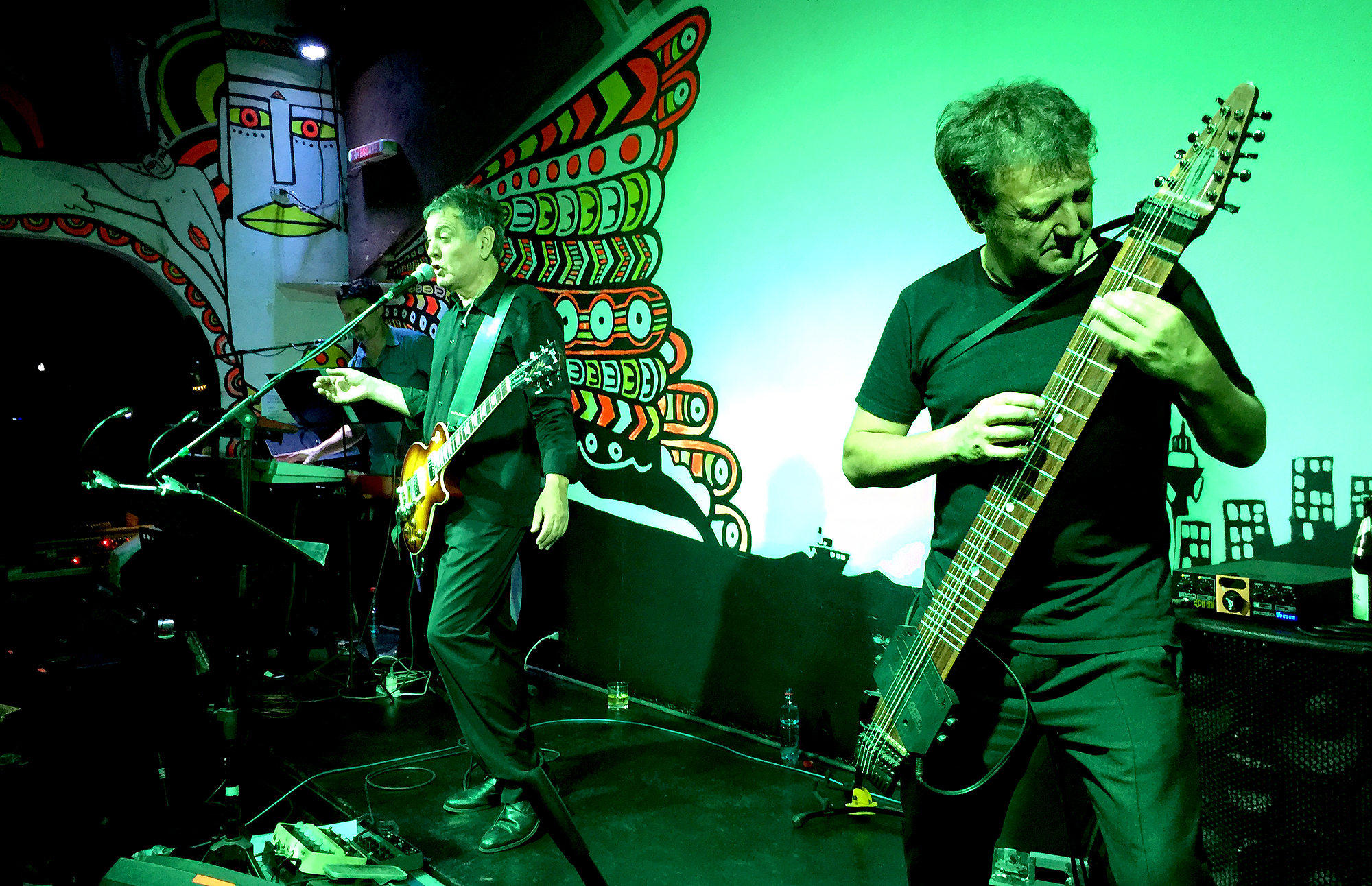
Electrodomesticos in 2015

Electrodomésticos (Spanish for Appliances) is a Chilean band of experimental rock and electronic rock, formed in Santiago de Chile in 1984. The band was one of the most critically acclaimed avant-garde acts of the underground scene of Pinochet´s Chile during the 1980s. They were active from 1984 to 1991, when they produced two remarkable albums, Viva Chile and Carrera de éxitos. They reunited in 2002 and created a new album called La Nueva Canción Chilena. They dissolved again in 2005, and reunited again in 2011, when a documentary about them was made by Sergio Castro, called Electrodomésticos: El frío misterio. Carlos Cabezas was the founding member and leader of the band. In 2017 they released a new studio album called Ex la humanidad.

== Discography ==
- 1986 - ¡Viva Chile!
- 1987 - Carreras De Éxitos
- 2004 - La Nueva Canción Chilena
- 2013 - Se Caiga El Cielo
- 2014 - El Calor (EP)
- 2017 - Ex la humanidad
