= Quique Neira =

Chilean musician and singer

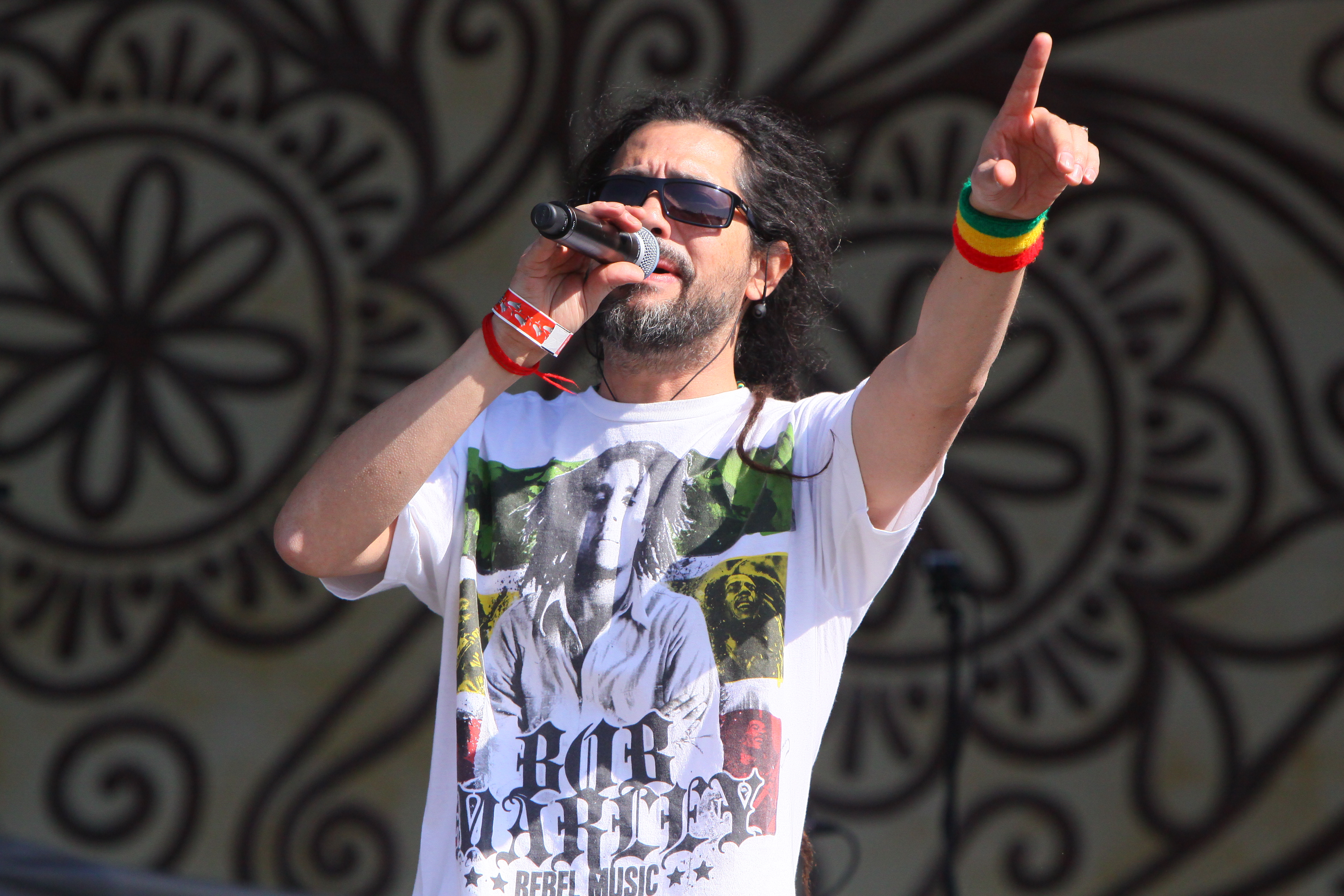
Quique Neira in Lollapalooza

Enrique "Quique" Neira Leiva (born April 11, 1973) is a Chilean reggae singer and composer. He was the lead vocalist of the band Gondwana and is currently a solo artist. He is the most recognized icon of the reggae en español movement in Chile.

== Awards ==
- Award for Musical Arts Altazor 2006, category Best Pop Ballad for good things.
- APES Award 2006, Best Composer category.
- Recently elected as a board member of the SCD.

== Discography ==
=== In Bambu ===
- Bambu (1995)
- No necesitamos Banderas (1996)

=== In Gondwana ===
- Gondwana (1997)
- RAS Portraits: Gondwana (1998)
- Phat Cherimoya Dub (1999)
- Together (1999)
- Praise (For the Strength of Reason) (2000)
- Made in Jamaica (2002)

=== Solo ===
- Eleven (2003)
- Cosas Buenas (2005)
- Jah Rock (2007) Edition Europe 2010;
- Jah Dub (2010)
- Alma (2011)
- Un Amor (2014)
- La Vida Es Una Canción Vol.1 (2017)
- Cover Me (EP) (2018)
- La Vida Es Una Canción II (2019)

== Awards ==
- Altazor Award for Musical Arts 2006, category Best Pop Ballad for good things.
- APES Award 2006, Best Composer category.
- Recently elected as a board member of the SCD.
