= Hasta la Verdad =

Single by Javiera Mena

from the album Mena
- Language: Spanish
- Released: May 23, 2010
- Genre: Latin pop; Italo disco
- Length: 4:53
- Label: Unión del Sur
- Songwriter: Javiera Mena
- Producers: Cristian Heyne; Javiera Mena

Javiera Mena singles chronology
"Hasta la Verdad" (2010)	"Primera Estrella" (2010)

Alternative cover
- Remixes EP cover

Music video
- "Hasta la Verdad" on YouTube

"Hasta la Verdad" (Spanish: [ˈasta la βeɾˈðað], lit. 'Until the Truth') is a song by Chilean singer-songwriter Javiera Mena. Written by Mena herself and produced by Cristian Heyne, the song was released on May 23, 2010, as the first single from her second studio album, Mena.

== Background ==
"Hasta la Verdad" marked Javiera Mena's first new material in four years following her 2006 debut album Esquemas Juveniles. The song is actually one of Mena's earliest songs, dating back to her days as a student at the ProJazz music school. The track was originally written for a songwriting workshop course alongside another song, "El Amanecer". Neither made it onto Esquemas Juveniles, but both songs were eventually included on the follow-up album. By 2008, the song had already been announced as a potential inclusion on he follow-up album, and Mena was already performing it on live shows.

When preparing the song for inclusion on the album, Mena collaborated with her friend Diego Morales to develop the base track. Together they revisited old records and obtained inspiration from 1980s songs with a strong Italo disco influence, whose elements they decided to incorporate into the track. Most of the programming was done by Mena herself, and she then subsequently submitted the demo to Cristian Heyne, which he later perfected. The song was also enhanced by string arrangements by New York-based musician and producer Kelley Polar. The collaboration originated through MySpace; Mena contacted him directly to express admiration for his music and asked him if he would agree to collaborate with her. Upon receiving a copy and listening to Esquemas Juveniles, Polar agreed to collaborate with Mena. The song's vocals were recorded at Heyne's personal studio. The song was mastered by Jim Brick at Absolute Studio (Atlantic Highlands, NJ).

== Musical style and themes ==
The song served as the first illustration of the evolution of Mena's music, from the distinct indie pop and lo-fi electronic elements of her first record, toward more dance-floor-oriented music.

The main theme of the song is the pursue of truth as a never-ending journey, which is also a common theme on various songs by Mena. About this, she commented: "I see it as the search, the path, but you never actually arrive [...] that's why it's always 'hasta la verdad' [until the truth] or 'my truth,' but it's never quite clear what that truth is. I think that's somewhat the throughline of the album: the search for truth. Being close but never quite arriving." Thematically, Mena commented that on the song she first addressed her vision "astral-vibe romance," which she would further explore in later songs such as "Corazón Astral". The song also showcases Mena's playful use of the Spanish language on her lyrics, such as with the phrase "rayo di [sic] lunar" which bear similarities to Italian, and the verb "viará" (future tense of invented verb "viar", possibly akin to 'guiar' [to guide]).

Retrospectively reflecting on the significance of "Hasta la Verdad" in her career, Mena commented: "It is a song that opened many doors for me. It also made me connect, as a person and as an artist, with my own creativity, my own way of expressing myself, which is this cosmic and romantic thing."

== Music video ==
The music video for "Hasta la Verdad" was directed by fellow Chilean artist Alex Anwandter, with production and photography handled by Cristián Heyne and Rocío Aguirre, respectively. The video was described as a sort of road movie, shot with a single camera during a trip to the coast. About the filming, Mena commented: "We left from Santiago to Algarrobo, filmed along the way and ended up in a house. It was very relaxed [and] turned out great for the budget [we had]."

== Release ==
The single was first made available for streaming through SoundCloud by Chilean music site Super 45 on May 23, 2010. The song was then commercially released through the iTunes Store, where it was subsequently listed as Single of the Week.

On December 17, 2010, Mena released a free digital EP of remixes of "Hasta la Verdad" via her official website. In an accompanying message, Mena included personal comments for each contributing artist.

== Critical reception ==
The song was praised by contemporary music critics. Super 45 deemed the song as an example of Mena's ambitions for her second album: an elegant, intelligent, glamorous, and subtly introspective form of pop with no room for missteps. They lauded the single's skillful layering and dynamic build as evidence of her growth and potential to reach new horizons. Remezcla named it one of the best songs of 2010, commenting "It might not be the most exciting song on [Mena], but slow burner “Hasta La Verdad” is a smart composition that doesn’t lose any energy in slowing down. The added drama of the string section in this brilliant arrangement turns the song into a subtle, yet still inspiring, symphony." Club Fonograma praised the song enthusiastically, describing it as a "utopian universe" with "flowery, shimmering and very flirtatious" qualities, tumbling vocals, disco strings, and reflective lyrics. They noted its less immediate but ultimately great quality after repeated listens, affirming Mena's evolved yet consistent artistic vision.

== Track listings and formats ==
- Digital download/streaming
1. "Hasta la Verdad" – 4:53
- CD single
1. "Hasta la Verdad" (radio edit) – 3:26
2. "Hasta la Verdad" – 4:55
3. "Hasta la Verdad" (instrumental) – 4:52
- 2024 live version single
1. "Hasta La Verdad" (live at Teatro Municipal) – 7:23
2. "Esquemas Juveniles" (live at Teatro Municipal) – 3:44
- Remixes EP
1. "Hasta La Verdad" (Rebolledo remix) – 5:17
2. "Hasta La Verdad" (Dapuntobeat remix) – 5:01
3. "Hasta La Verdad" (Lucrecia Dalt remix) – 4:57
4. "Hasta La Verdad" (Astro remix) – 3:42
5. "Hasta La Verdad" (Eme DJ & José Contreras remix) – 4:48
6. "Hasta La Verdad" (Toomy Disco remix) – 6:00
7. "Hasta La Verdad" (Pablo Bello remix) – 6:33
8. "Hasta La Verdad" (Alejandro Paz remix) – 4:35
9. "Hasta La Verdad" (acoustic) – 4:00
