= Música, Gramática, Gimnasia =

Studio album by Dënver
- Released: October 27, 2010
- Genre: Indie pop; chamber pop; synth-pop
- Length: 46:44
- Language: Spanish
- Label: Cazador
- Producer: Cristian Heyne; Milton Mahan

Dënver chronology
Totoral (2008)	Música, Gramática, Gimnasia (2010)	Fuera de Campo (2013)

Música, Gramática, Gimnasia (Spanish: [ˈmusika ɡɾaˈmatika ximˈnasja], lit. 'Music, Grammar, Gymnastics') is the second studio album by Chilean indie pop duo Dënver, released on October 27, 2010, by Cazador.

== Background ==
The first album by Dënver, Totoral, had an austere production, recorded in a home studio with limited time and resources. Additionally, at that time both members of the band lacked extensive knowledge in music production, and relied heavily on Felipe "Pondie" Aravena. However, for this album, the band had greater ambition: they aimed for more elaborate instrumentation, with additional guitars, basses, strings, and orchestral arrangements. By this point, Mariana Montenegro had already studied music at college, so she was able to communicate her ideas more clearly to everyone involved in the recording. For the album, the duo worked with renowned producer Cristian Heyne, who provided guidance and helped them polish their sound to help them materialize what they had in mind.

The album title originated during online research about Ancient Greek culture, where they encountered references to these three disciplines as foundational subjects taught to children in Ancient Greece, astray felt the concepts aligned closely with the themes and artistic intentions of the record.

In retrospective, the duo described Música, Gramática, Gimnasia as an album marked that emerged organically, noting that the duo had no fixed recipe or formula for creating it. He credited producer Cristián Heyne with playing a key role in shaping the final product, particularly through his involvement in curating the track listing. Mahan also pointed to the song titles as contributing to the album's character and observed that the record captured an innocence of that period, preserving a sense of youthful purity that defined its enduring appeal.

== Release ==
Música, Gramática, Gimnasia was initially released as a free download in Chile. According to the band, their original strategy was to sell the album through iTunes, but this was not possible in Chile at the time due to restrictions on purchasing music via that platform in the country. As a result, they opted to offer it as a free digital release within Chile to allow fans access to the music during the period leading up to the physical edition's availability.

In Spain, the album was released through the label Federación de Universos Pop (FUP). In Mexico, the album was issued by the label Terrícolas Imbéciles, as a two-disc set including the album Totoral.

To commemorate the album's tenth anniversary, in 2020 the album was reissued in Chile on LP format by Disco Intrépido.

== Critical reception ==
The album received received widespread acclaim, particularly within the Ibero-American indie music scene, establishing the Chilean duo as a breakthrough act in the local indie scene, and it opened doors for them to various international festivals and tours outside their country. Club Fonograma gave the album a 92/100 rating, calling it "a young adult masterpiece, a trial on error success of a duo in full command and affection to their art." and "One of the most stimulating, vibrant, and transcendental records of the year." Spanish site Jenesaispop gave it an 8.5/10 review, celebrating its "ambitious, unprejudiced" vision that unites disparate styles—disco, noise, melodic song, electro, funk, and orchestral arrangements—into a coherent whole, comparable to eclectic acts like Spanish band Klaus & Kinski. They named "Los Adolescentes" as the best track on the album, with other standouts being "Lo Que Quieras", "Olas Gigantes," and "En Medio de una Fiesta." Writing for Spanish magazine Mondo Sonoro, Xavi Sánchez gave a positive review on the album, describing it as a standout collection of "total pop" songs, showcasing remarkable variety, and commenting: "Mariana Montenegro and Milton Mahan soar high on an album that reveals itself as one of the most talked-about explosions of pop talent" at that time.

Chilean independent music journal Super 45 named Música, Gramática, Gimnasia the tenth best album released in 2010. Writing for this yearly review, Andrés Panes called it "the biggest qualitative leap" of that year, commenting "With Totoral as a reference point, there was no way to predict that Dënver would hit the bullseye on their second attempt, but that is exactly what happened. Melodies, lyrics, arrangements, design; everything on this album is crafted as irresistible, top-tier pop. And how could you not sympathize, on top of that, with an album released for free, put out by Cazador (one of the best independent labels in Chile) and produced by the increasingly legendary Cristián Heyne. It does not get any better than this. Only the San Felipe duo, in a future album, could prove otherwise." Mexican music site Me Hace Ruido ranked the album 13th, while Spanish music site Jenesaispop ranked it 21st on their lists of best albums of 2010.

== Track listing ==
All tracks are written by Mariana Montenegro and Milton Mahan.

Música, Gramática, Gimnasia track listing
No.	Title	Length
1.	"Mi Primer Oro"	3:17
2.	"Olas Gigantes"	4:42
3.	"Lo Que Quieras"	4:31
4.	"Diane Keaton"	3:52
5.	"Los Adolescentes"	6:47
6.	"Los Bikers"	4:30
7.	"Feedback"	5:19
8.	"Cartagena"	3:26
9.	"Segundas Destrezas"	1:11
10.	"Litoral Central"	3:54
11.	"En Medio de una Fiesta"	3:56

Música, Gramática, Gimnasia — Spanish/Mexican edition, Chilean reissue bonus track
No.	Title	Length
12.	"De Explosiones y Delitos"	3:47

== Personnel ==
Credits adapted from the liner notes of Música, Gramática, Gimnasia.

- Cristián Heyne – music production, mastering
- Milton Mahan – songwriting, vocals, bass, guitar, chorus arrangement (7, 8), music production, mastering
- Mariana Montenegro – songwriting, vocals, keyboards, piano
- Mauricio Galleguillos – acoustic drums
- Óscar Montenegro – saxophone
- Matías Varela – trombone
- Ignacio Muñoz – trumpet
- Conjunto Egmont – strings
- Fakuta & The Laura Palmers – chorus (7, 8)
- Pamela Sepúlveda – chorus arrangements (7, 8)
- Marco Romero – editing, recording (vocals, synthesizer, guitar, bass)
- Gonzalo González – recording (strings, brass, drums)
- Rodrigo Sáez – recording (piano)
- Ricardo García Villegas – photography
- Alejandro Soto Salas – illustrations
- Pablo Serrano – design
- Felicia Morales – make up
- Pedro Rajevic – model
- Tamara Ibarra Montenegro – model

== Release history ==
Region	Date	Label	Format	Ref.
Chile	October 27, 2010	Cazador	Digital download; CD	
Spain	February 8, 2011	Federación De Universos Pop	CD	
Spain	July 27, 2011	Federación De Universos Pop	LP	
Mexico	2011	Terrícolas Imbéciles	2CD (Note: 2-CD-set including the album Totoral.)	
Chile	2012	Feria Music	CD (reissue)	
Various	2013		Streaming	
Chile	2016	Plaza Independencia Música	CD (reissue)	
Chile	2020	Plaza Independencia Música; Disco Intrépido	LP	
