= Esquemas Juveniles =

Studio album by Javiera Mena
- Released: October 4, 2006
- Recorded: 2004—2005
- Studio: Kanguro
- Genre: Indie pop; synth-pop; Latin pop
- Length: 46:44
- Language: Spanish
- Label: Quemasucabeza; Índice Virgen; Various
- Producer: Cristian Heyne

Javiera Mena chronology
Esquemas Juveniles (2006)	Mena (2010)

Esquemas Juveniles (Spanish: [esˈkemas xuβeˈniles], lit. 'Youthful Frameworks' or 'Youthful Schemes') is the debut album by Chilean singer-songwriter Javiera Mena, released on October 4, 2006, by Quemasucabeza.

== Background and release ==
Javiera Mena began experimenting with music production at the age of 13, after acquiring her first computer, where she created small programmed sequences and combined them with guitar recordings. Around 2000, while still in her final year of school, she began recording her first material which comprised guitar-based songs that would be then shared through Soulseek.

After finishing high school, Mena went on to study music composition at the music school Pro Jazz, a decision that marked a shift toward more formal musical training. At the same time, Mena subsequently began her musical career as part of the indie group Prissa, where she had already been making and sharing music online for a couple of years, reaching an considerable number of listeners through MySpace With the help of producer and sound engineer Pablo Muñoz (Gargales, De Janeiros), Mena began working on her first album, but later moved on from this project to work with Gabriel Vigliensoni (Lucybell) and then Cristian Heyne, seeking a more professional approach. The songs from this period were subsequently compiled in the album Primeras Composiciones released in 2013.

Leaving her first compositions behind, Mena consciously moved away from a folk-pop style, stating that she wanted to create "something Pop, not so Chilean." This shift was driven by her close relationship with her computer, and her circle involved mutual influence among friends sharing bands, tastes, and experimentation blending pop, folk, and electronic. Her friends Arturo Saray and Raúl Durán (Quierostar) introduced her to the music production software Orion. She subsequently transitioned to Fruity Loops. During this period, Mena mentioned the Electroclash movement, and acts such as Miss Kittin, as influences.

The process of producing Esquemas Juveniles spanned three to four years. Cristian Heyne began working on the record in 2004. About his involvement, he commented: "Through a mutual friend, I approached [Mena] in the summer of [2004], after we had met in 2001. I had listened to some of her songs on MySpace, and I proposed producing her." Production was mainly supported by Sebastián Carreras and Martín Crespo from Argentine label Índice Virgen, plus Heyne and journalist Cristián Araya from Chile. In August 2005, independent label Quemasucabeza released the compilation album Panorama Neutral, which featured Mena's first commercially-released song, "Sol de invierno." While Heyne ended up producing the album, Mena composed and arranged eight of the album's ten songs, and also played a large part of the instruments featured on the recording. Exceptions were the cover "Yo no te pido la luna" (Spanish language cover of "Non voglio mica la luna" popularized by Mexican singer Daniela Romo) and "Como siempre soñé", whose lyrics were written by fellow Chilean singer Sofía Oportot of Lulú Jam. On the other hand, fellow musician Daniel Riveros contributed with drums and vocals in "Sol de invierno." Mena commented that tracks such as "Al Siguiente Nivel," "Cuando Hablamos," "Casan," and "Como Siempre Soñé" were fully programmed by her on her laptop with minimal additional production beyond Heyne's mixing.

The album was early-released in August 2006 in Argentina through independent label Índice Virgen. The Chilean edition was officially released on October 4, 2006, via Quemasucabeza, with a concert held at Teatro Mori in Santiago. In 2007, the album was released in Japan via Art Union, including a bonus track. In 2008, the album was released in Mexico via EMI.

The cover artwork was designed by Argentine graphic artist Alejandro Ros.

== Critical reception ==
Writing for the Chilean independent music outlet Super 45, critic Andrés Acevedo described Esquemas Juveniles as a "delicately produced album designed to connect with its listeners," where Mena "reaches a level of meticulousness that is hard for her peers to match". Acevedo highlighted the album's delicate layering of instruments, which create leisurely seductive atmospheres while preserving melodic freshness and a sincere, naïve charm free from mass-market formulas or disposable bubblegum aesthetics. Writing for Sound and Colors, Russ Slater described the album as "a ground-breaking release, a true pop masterpiece that laid the groundwork for all the indie pop that was to follow". He praised Mena's songwriting skills and noted that the album, composed of "cutting synth numbers" and "slower soulful ballads", could be described as "if Karen Carpenter had been trained by Erasure and then recorded with The Knife."

In 2025, The Clinic regarded Esquemas Juveniles as "a transformative album that permanently shifted the paradigm surrounding pop music in Chile, validating it as a legitimate and viable artistic option for an entire subsequent generation of musicians", noting that it gave a voice to the youth of the 2000s while exemplifying an independent, self-managed way of creating and releasing music.

== Cultural impact ==
In 2009, Club Fonograma ranked Esquemas Juveniles second on their ranking of the Top 10 Albums of the Decade (2000s), behind Café Tacuba's Cuatro Caminos.

In 2025, Esquemas Juveniles was selected number one in a poll conducted by The Clinic on the 50 best Chilean albums of the 21st century, in which surveyed more than 100 Chilean artists on what they considered the best national albums released between 2000 and 2024.

== Track listing ==
All tracks are written by Javiera Mena, except where noted.

Esquemas Juveniles track listing
No.	Title	Lyrics	Music	Length
1.	"Al Siguiente Nivel"			4:04
2.	"Esquemas Juveniles"			3:34
3.	"Como Siempre Soñé"	Sofía Oportot		4:50
4.	"Sol de Invierno" (feat. Gepe)			4:24
5.	"Cámara Lenta"			5:27
6.	"Casan (No Puedo Bloquear Lo Que Quiero Dar)"			4:31
7.	"Cuando Hablamos"			4:28
8.	"Está en Tus Manos"			6:18
9.	"Yo No Te Pido La Luna"	Daniela Romo	Enzo Malepasso; Luigi Albertelli	3:43
10.	"Perlas"			5:25

Esquemas Juveniles — Japanese/Mexican edition bonus track
No.	Title	Length
11.	"Hambre (La Comida)"	3:42

== Personnel ==
Credits adapted from the liner notes of Esquemas Juveniles.

- Javiera Mena – vocals, bass, synthesizer, piano, guitar, percussion, programming
- Cristian Heyne – production, recording, mixing (1-6, 8, 9), drums (4), guitar solo (5)
- Gabriel Lucena – mastering, mixing (7)
- Diego Morales – mixing (10)
- Matías Radic – drums (2)
- Daniel Riveros – vocals (4), drums (5)
- Daniel Guerrero – handclaps (5)
- Juan José Aránguiz – handclaps (5)
- Rodrigo Peñailillo – handclaps (5)
- Miguel Miranda – synthesizer (5)
- Gabriel Vingliensoni - keyboards (10)
- Alejandro Ros - design, photography

== Release history ==
Region	Date	Label	Format	Ref.
Argentina	August 2006	Índice Virgen	CD	
Chile	October 4, 2006	Quemasucabeza	CD	
Japan	May 30, 2007	Art Union	CD	
Mexico	2008	EMI Mexico	CD	
Various	August 22, 2011	Unión del Sur	Digital download; streaming	
Chile	2014	Unión del Sur	LP	
Chile	2016	Meni	CD; digital download; streaming	

== Tribute album ==
Adolescente Perpetuo (Un Tributo a Esquemas Juveniles)

Studio album by Various Artists
- Released: October 14, 2016
- Genre: Latin pop
- Length: 49:06
- Language: Spanish
- Label: El Amarillo; Ponk Records

Adolescente Perpetuo (Un Tributo a Esquemas Juveniles) is a 2016 tribute album to Javiera Mena's album Esquemas Juveniles. It features various artists covering the songs of Mena's debut album.

In commemoration of the tenth anniversary of Esquemas Juveniles, this album was developed by Colombian music blog El Amarillo, which assembled a group of independent artists from Argentina, Costa Rica, Peru, Mexico, Puerto Rico, Chile, and Spain, to contribute their perspective on each track of the record.

The album was made available for free download via Bandcamp, as well as being released on music streaming platforms.

=== Track listing (Adolescente Perpetuo) ===
No.	Title	Artist	Length
1.	"Al Siguiente Nivel"	Violeta Castillo	4:14
2.	"Esquemas Juveniles"	Chico Unicornio	3:25
3.	"Como Siempre Soñé"	Sofía Oportot	3:38
4.	"Sol de invierno"	Ignacio Herbojo	3:58
5.	"Cámara Lenta"	Fakuta	4:53
6.	"Casan"	Hijos	3:17
7.	"Cuando Hablamos"	Capullo	5:05
8.	"Está en Tus Manos"	Balún	5:41
9.	"Yo No Te Pido La Luna"	Sokio	4:07
10.	"Perlas"	Bruno Toro	3:30
11.	"Hambre"	Le Parody	3:24
