= Espejo (album) =

Studio album by Javiera Mena
- Released: April 27, 2018
- Genre: Latin pop; synth-pop; dance-pop
- Length: 38:12
- Language: Spanish
- Label: Sony Music Chile
- Producer: Javiera Mena; Alizzz; El Guincho; Diego Morales; Fernando Herrera; Juan Sueiro; Nico Parra

Javiera Mena chronology
Otra Era (2014)	Espejo (2018)	I. Entusiasmo (2021)

Singles from Espejo
- 1. "Dentro de Ti" Released: November 3, 2017; 2. "Intuición" Released: March 23, 2018; 3. "Espejo" Released: August 27, 2018; 4. "Alma" Released: December 14, 2018

Espejo (Spanish: [esˈpexo], lit. 'Mirror') is the fourth studio album by Chilean singer-songwriter Javiera Mena, released on April 27, 2018, by Sony Music.

== Background and release ==
Following the release of Otra Era, Javiera Mena received her first Latin Grammy nomination, and was invited for the first time to Viña del Mar International Song Festival, the most prestigious festival in her home country. In June 2017, Javiera Mena announced her transition from independent music to a major label by signing with the multinational company Sony Music. The agreement was formalized in Buenos Aires, marking a significant shift after she had independently released four studio albums since her 2006 debut. In an official statement, Sony Music described it as an honor to welcome her into their roster and noted that she was already working on her forthcoming new studio album. In November of the same year, Mena released her single "Dentro de ti," which served as the first official preview of the new album.

The production of new album marked a deliberate departure from her long-time collaborator Cristian Heyne, with whom she had worked closely since her debut. She commented that their collaboration began to feel strained during the making of Otra Era, and described the split as a mutual agreement, and the natural end of a creative chapter. For this new chapter, Mena expressed interest in working with multiple producers while maintaining a unified sound, drawing particular inspiration from the Spanish music scene. Notable contributors included Spanish acts such as El Guincho; Mena's initial idea was for him to produce the entire album, but due to time and scheduling conflicts, she ended up appointing other producers, while assuming a stronger role as producer herself. Mena reached out to producer Alizzz, as she was admittedly intrigued by his solo work—distinct from his high-profile productions for C. Tangana—and feeling it aligned closely with her aesthetic. Much of their work conducted remotely via email and file exchanges, though they later met in person at his studio.

Mena described Espejo as noticeably calmer in terms of tempo compared to her previous work, in which she favored mid-tempos over the more energetic and outward-facing rhythms of Otra Era, and commenting that this album shares a closer connection with her second album Mena instead, as they share a more relaxed and tranquil spirit. According to Mena, Espejo was conceived as a highly introspective work, focused on looking inward through the mirror metaphor, with relatively few lyrics. One of the central themes of Espejo is an exploration of "truth"—which has also been a recurring theme on Mena's previous albums— as an underlying force beneath everything—something fundamental that exists regardless of belief or religion. Drawing inspiration from figures like Emily Brontë, whose poetry she saw as deeply connected to an essential truth behind words and human experience, Mena noted the challenge of articulating such ideas without them feeling cheapened or overhandled by language. Mena also cited her personal experience with Buddhism and meditation—citing authors such as Chögyam Trungpa—as inspiration for the record. Mena also incorporated Latin and Caribbean rhythmic influences throughout Espejo, which she reinterpreted electronically via techno and house frameworks to maintain their presence in fresh ways. A notable Latin collaboration on the album came with Liliana Saumet, the vocalist of Colombian band Bomba Estéreo, whom Mena have been friends with since meeting in New York a couple of years prior.

She also deemed that her vocals on this album also reached a new level of mastery and presence, which was amplified by the album's simpler, less layered arrangements, allowing her voice to stand out more clearly. According to Mena, a key contributor to this was renowned mixer Michael Brauer, whom Mena personally requested to work on the record. Mena's described Brauer's involvement as key in bringing out a warmer, more commanding quality in her vocals, while adhering to his signature philosophy of making the voice the focal point and dominant element on each track.

== Critical reception ==
Espejo received a generally positive to mixed reception from critics. Muzikalia gave the album generally positive review, viewing it as a reflective evolution after the hedonistic Otra Era, where Mena emerged more contemplative and less dance-oriented while retaining her synth-pop and electronic core. They highlighted the tracks "Dentro de ti," "Espejo," "Cerca," "Alma" and "Aire" as standouts, but criticized the second half of the record as weak, with later tracks feeling diffuse, inconsequential, or even simplistic. Jenesaipop gave the album a 7.5/10 rating and made a similar critic to the second half of the album, deemed it as "less inspiring" than the first half.

Rolling Stone named it the 10th best album of 2018, which noted that despite the "slight disappointment" from her fanbase upon release due to its lower energy compared to its predecessor, it emerged as arguably Mena's most compelling work to date.

== Track listing ==
All tracks are written by Javiera Mena.

Espejo track listing
No.	Title	Producer(s)	Length
1.	"Dentro de Ti"	Juan Sueiro; Javiera Mena; Fernando Herrera	3:38
2.	"Espejo"	Alizzz; Mena	3:44
3.	"Cerca"	Alizzz; Mena	3:44
4.	"Alma"	Nico Parra; Mena	3:46
5.	"Intuición" (featuring Li Saumet)	El Guincho; Mena	3:54
6.	"Aire"	Alizzz; Mena	3:47
7.	"Escalera"	Diego Morales; Parra; Mena	3:58
8.	"Noche"	El Guincho; Mena	3:59
9.	"Todas Aquí"	Parra; Mena	3:40
10.	"Cuando No la Esperas"	Parra; Mena	3:58
Total length:			38:12

== Release history ==
Release dates and formats of Espejo
Region	Date	Format	Label	Ref.
Worldwide	September 30, 2022	Digital download; streaming	Sony Music	
Chile	September 30, 2022	CD; vinyl	Sony Music	
Argentina	September 30, 2022	CD; vinyl	Sony Music	
Spain	September 30, 2022	CD; vinyl	Sony Music	
