= Otra Era =

- Censored digital cover

Studio album by Javiera Mena
- Released: October 28, 2014
- Genre: Indie pop; synth-pop; Latin pop
- Length: 41:32
- Language: Spanish
- Label: Unión del Sur
- Producer: Cristian Heyne; Javiera Mena

Javiera Mena chronology
Mena (2011)	Otra Era (2014)	Espejo (2018)

Singles from Otra Era
- 1. "Espada" Released: November 27, 2013; 2. "La Joya" Released: June 3, 2014; 3. "Otra Era" Released: October 15, 2014; 4. "Que Me Tome la Noche" Released: April 7, 2015; 5. "Sincronía, Pegaso" Released: November 20, 2015

Otra Era (Spanish: [ˈotɾa ˈeɾa], lit. 'Another Era') is the third studio album by Chilean singer-songwriter Javiera Mena, released on October 27, 2010, by Unión del Sur.

== Background and release ==
Following the release of Mena, Javiera Mena announced a crowdfunding campaign in July 2013 to fund the creation of her then upcoming third album. For the album, Mena worked once again with long-time collaborator Cristián Heyne, although this time co-producing the record with him. The decision to crowdfund the album came as a suggestion from Heyne and her then manager, Consuelo Cortez. Mena admittedly was unfamiliar with the model, but became interested upon learning that community financing extended beyond music to support various artistic and architectural projects. While the campaign did not cover all expenses due to the project's scale, it provided crucial initial momentum. The funds raised through the campaign helped her purchase the master recordings for her earlier work, which would be released as the compilation album Primeras Composiciones, in addition to supporting production costs for Otra Era. By the time of the campaign, portions of the material were already in progress. The track "Espada" was partially assembled and served as an early foundation.

According to Mena, on Otra Era she wanted to think in terms of a kind of “robotic pop” rather than to appeal to an organic concept. The concept emerged from personal sessions on her computer, which were later developed in what she called her “ship”—her personal laptop along with instruments such as keyboards and synthesizers. Mena acknowledges that for this reason, the creative process for her new album was much easier, because she could take her instruments anywhere. Mena drew inspiration from her visits to Spain, Spanish club culture and unapologetic hedonism, where the discoteca represents something deeply rooted and cultural rather than superficial; and also Latin music elements which was something more organic: rhythms absorbed since childhood through family gatherings centered on cumbia, which she sang as a young girl, and also influences from African and Japanese music. Thematically, the record centers on the concepts of desire and search, as well as passion and love expressed through its most intense and physical aspects, which are emotions ultimately adapted and translated into the dance floor. Notable contributions from other artists on the record include Gepe on backing vocals on "Sincronía Pegaso;" Andrés Nusser of Astro on "La Joya," and El Guincho on "La Carretera." The title track "Otra Era" was the album's only track mixed in Chile, the rest of songs were mixed in Miami.

"Espada" was released as the album's first single in November 2013, followed by "La Joya" in June 2014. On October 10, 2014, Mena announced the digital pre-order for Otra Era, ahead of its official release on October 28 of that same year. The album's lead single, "Otra Era," was released on October 15, 2014. "Sincronia, Pegaso" was released as the album's follow-up single in November 2015. In Chile, the album was released through Unión del Sur, label co-founded by Mena and Cristián Heyne.

== Cover artwork ==
The cover artwork, in which Mena appears topless, was conceptualized by Carlos Diez with photography by Javier Bernal and design by Alejandro Ros, with its reveal coincided with the pre-order announcement of Otra Era. The image generated significant discussion on local and international media, being censored by media outlets such as iTunes, Spotify and Deezer. In this respect, Mena commented: "We took the photos and decided to do it with a bare torso because it looked cleaner. We had the option of using a statue, but that would have been censored too. It also serves to make you realize how everything works and that power always ends up belonging to the conservatives."

The white-framed snow goggles worn by Mena on the cover are inspired by the futuristic design from 1965 created by André Courrèges.

== Critical reception ==
Otra Era received positive to mixed reviews from music critics. Club Fonograma gave the album a 92/100 rating, with Andrew Casillas describing it as a "sensational dance-pop classic" that refined her established sound—Casio keys, electric drums, sound effects, bass-centric melodies, and direct lyrics—into its purest, most uniform, and aggressive form yet, drawing comparisons to Kylie Minogue's Fever and Pet Shop Boys' Very. While acknowledging that Otra Era does not quite equal the heights of Mena, Casillas ultimately calls it a “modern classic” from one of the generation’s defining artists, one that confidently packages her identity and places her firmly "on the road to immortality." Spanish magazine Mondo Sonoro gave the album a 4/5 stars rating, describing it as a "bold and invigorating" evolution in Mena's career, representing a fearless leap into “intelligent and sophisticated mainstream” territory: high-quality, radio-friendly dance music free of indie prejudices. They deemed the record as a confident step forward that presents “another Javiera Mena” ready to dominate the dance-pop arena. Indie Hoy described Otra Era as a "major regional pop production," naming it the 11th best album of 2014.

In contrast, the Mexican edition of Time Out magazine gave the album a mixed review. While praising the dancefloor appeal of Otra Era, they criticized the excessive use of synthesizers on the record, which made it felt saturated and gave the listener "no time to breath" and pay attention to the songs' lyrics. Additionally, they criticized the absence of melancholic ballads such as "No Te Cuesta Nada" or "Un Audífono Tú, Un Audífono Yo" from Mena, and overall lamented the lack of the immediate charm, simplicity, and freshness of her earlier output, marking this chapter as a deliberate but less enchanting "new era."

The album title track "Otra Era" was nominated for Best Alternative Song at the 16th Annual Latin Grammy Awards.

== Track listing ==
All tracks are written by Javiera Mena.

Otra Era track listing
No.	Title	Length
1.	"Los Olores de Tu Alma"	5:01
2.	"Otra Era"	4:05
3.	"Esa Fuerza"	4:34
4.	"Sincronía, Pegaso"	4:46
5.	"Pide"	3:28
6.	"La Joya"	3:28
7.	"Que Me Tome la Noche"	3:28
8.	"La Carretera"	4:49
9.	"Quédate un Ratito Más"	3:40
10.	"Espada"	4:14
Total length:		41:32

== Personnel ==
Credits adapted from the liner notes of Otra Era.

- Javiera Mena – vocals, composer, arranger, programmer, synthesizer, piano, producer
- Cristián Heyne – synthesizer, programmer, producer, guitar (4), chorus (4)
- Francisco Straub – synthesizer, Waldorf bass (one oscillator)
- Gepe – additional vocals (4)
- Andrés Nusser – additional vocals (6)
- Laura Put – additional vocals (6)
- El Guincho – additional vocals (8)
- Fernando Herrera – mixing (2-10), guitar, co-producer, assistant producer, recording engineer
- Javier Garza – mixing (1)
- Sebastián Valdés – recording engineer
- Francisco Straub – recording engineer
- Francisco Holzmann – recording engineer
- Tom Coyne – mastering
- Javier Bernal Belchi – photography
- Alejandro Ros – design
- Carlos Diez Diez – art direction
- Consuelo Cortez – recording coordination and management

== Release history ==
Release dates and formats of Otra Era
Region	Date	Format	Label	Ref.
Worldwide	October 28, 2014	Digital download; streaming	Unión del Sur	
Chile	November 21, 2014	CD	Unión del Sur	(Note: First made available for purchase at Feria Pulsar 2014.)
Chile	December 2014	LP	Unión del Sur	
Chile	2015	CD; LP (reissue)	Meni	(Note: Available for purchase through Mena's official web site.)
