= Javiera Mena =

Chilean musician (born 1983)

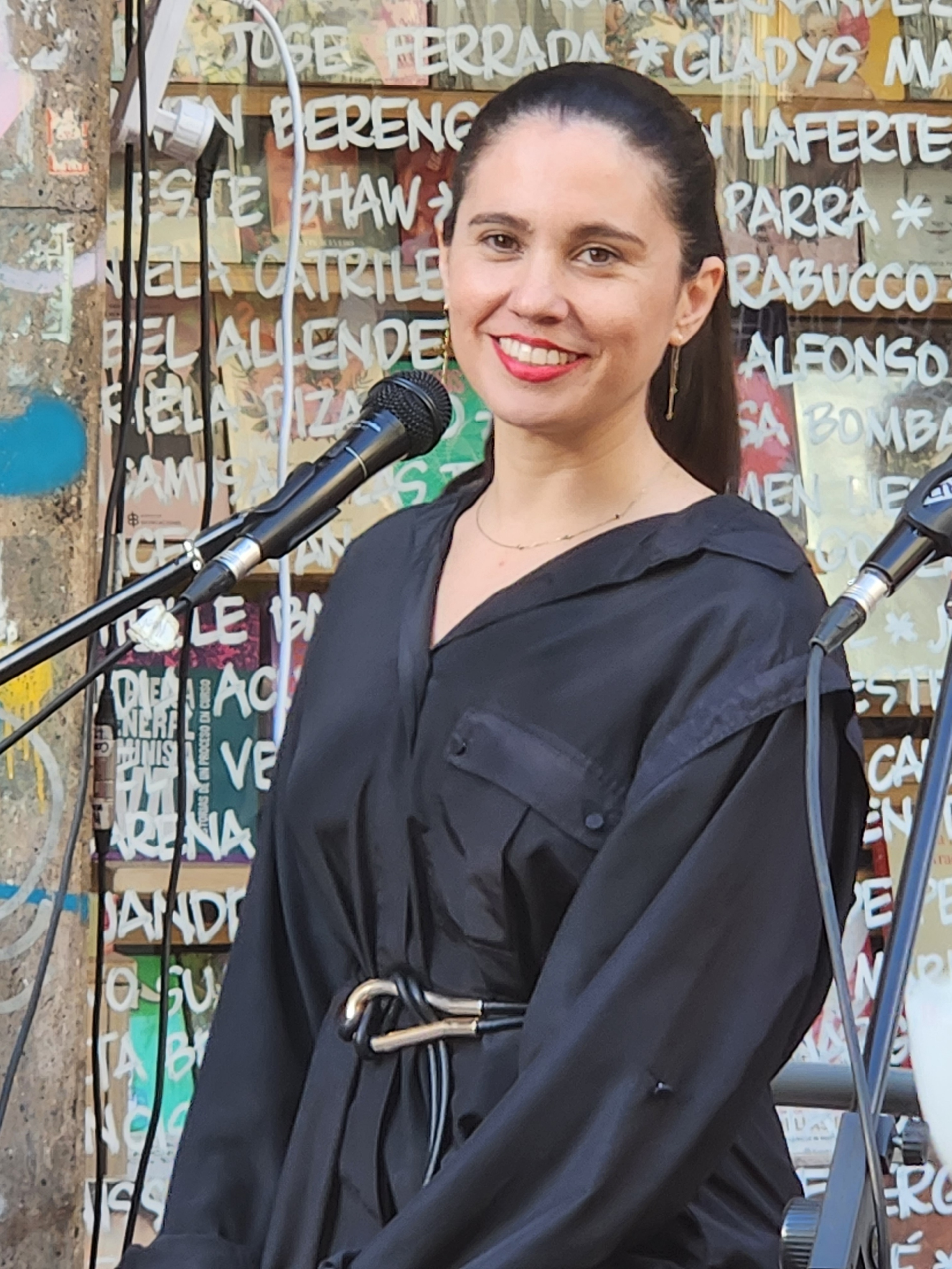
- Javiera Mena in March 2023

Background information
- Born: Javiera Alejandra Mena Carrasco; June 3, 1983 (age 43); Santiago, Chile
- Genres: Pop; indietronica; electropop; synthpop; indie pop
- Instruments: Vocals; synthesizer; guitar
- Years active: 2001–present
- Labels: Quemasucabeza; Unión del Sur; Sony Music Chile; MENI
- Website: https://www.javieramena.com

Javiera Alejandra Mena Carrasco (born June 3, 1983) is a Chilean singer, songwriter, musician, and record producer based in Madrid, Spain. She started her musical career in the Chilean indie music scene in 2001 and achieved wider success after the release of her debut studio album Esquemas Juveniles (2006). Her musical style tends to be synthesizer-based, although in her career beginnings she made acoustic-oriented songs, accompanied solely by guitar.

== Life and career ==
=== 1983–2003: Early years and career beginnings ===
Javiera Mena began performing live at the age of 17. Her first concert was held in a classroom of Juan Gómez Millas Campus at the University of Chile. In 2002, she began to study musical composition and musical arrangement at the music academy ProJazz, while also performing at underground parties and clubs. In 2003 she recorded various demos which leaked to the internet shortly thereafter and spread by her friends. In 2004, she performed outside Chile for the first time, opening for Argentine electropop band Entre Ríos in Buenos Aires.

Between 2003 and 2006, she was also part of the Electropop duet Prissa (formerly Tele Visa), along with her friend Francisca Villela. This group released a digital EP entitled Ni Tú Ni Yo.

=== 2004–2009: Esquemas Juveniles ===
Javiera's first song officially published was "Sol de Invierno", a duet with her friend and singer Gepe which was included in the 2005 compilation album Panorama Neutral. Another song, "Cámara Lenta", shortly after was included in the soundtrack of Alberto Fuguet’s movie Se arrienda. Her debut album, Esquemas Juveniles, was recorded between 2004 and 2005 and it was produced by Cristian Heyne. The album was first released in 2006 in Argentina by an indie label owned by Entre Ríos, and then was released in Chile and Japan through local indie labels. Her music began to achieve attention worldwide mainly because of the internet, especially through sites such as MySpace. This album was later named the second best album of the 2000s by Latin music website Club Fonograma, while its opening track "Al Siguiente Nivel" was named the best song of the decade.

In 2009, Mena performed in Europe for the first time, as being invited by Norwegian duo Kings of Convenience to be their opening act in their concerts held in Spain and Portugal.

=== 2010–2013: Mena ===
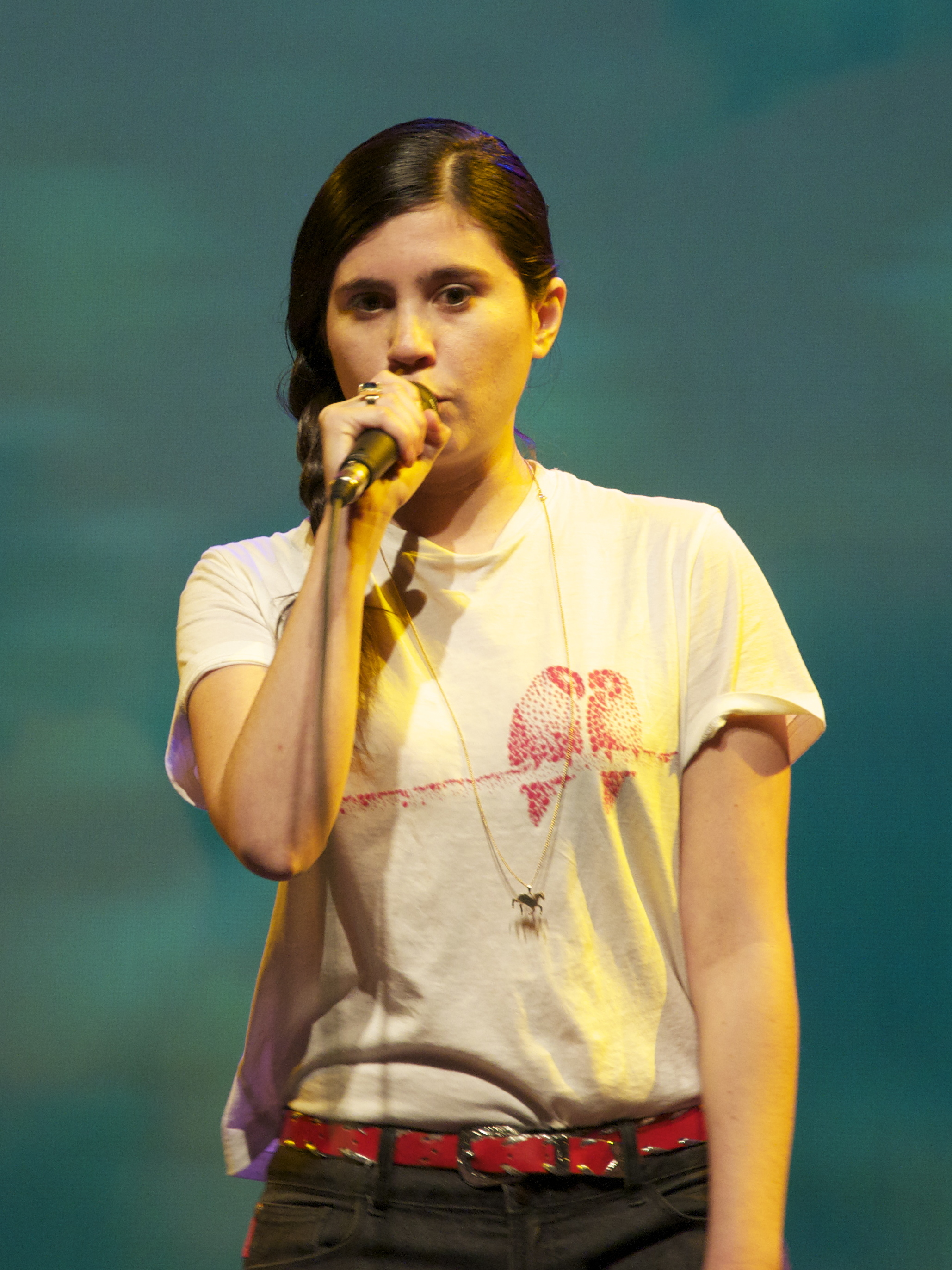
Mena performing in September 2010

After four years of production and mastering, Mena's second studio album, entitled Mena, was released in October 2010. This album was again produced by Cristian Heyne and took a more dancefloor-oriented style compared to her first work, which was more of a balance between dance with mid-tempo and slow ballads. The album's first single, "Hasta la Verdad", was listed as one of the "Singles of the Week" in the American version of the iTunes Store, and iTunes Mexico named Mena as the breakthrough album of the year. Club Fonograma gave Mena its first, and to date only, perfect 100 rating, and later named it their 2010 album of the year.

In April 2011, Javiera Mena performed live for the first time at Chilean version of Lollapalooza. In May, she toured in Spain and performed live as one of the first Latin American acts of the Primavera Sound Festival in Barcelona. She was praised for her performance and got the attention of the Spanish local press.

In 2012, Mena was featured in El Guincho's single "Novias".

In March 2013, Mena along with fellow countryman artist Gepe collaborated with Mexican singer-songwriter Julieta Venegas for a song entitled "Vuelve".

=== 2014–2016: Otra Era ===
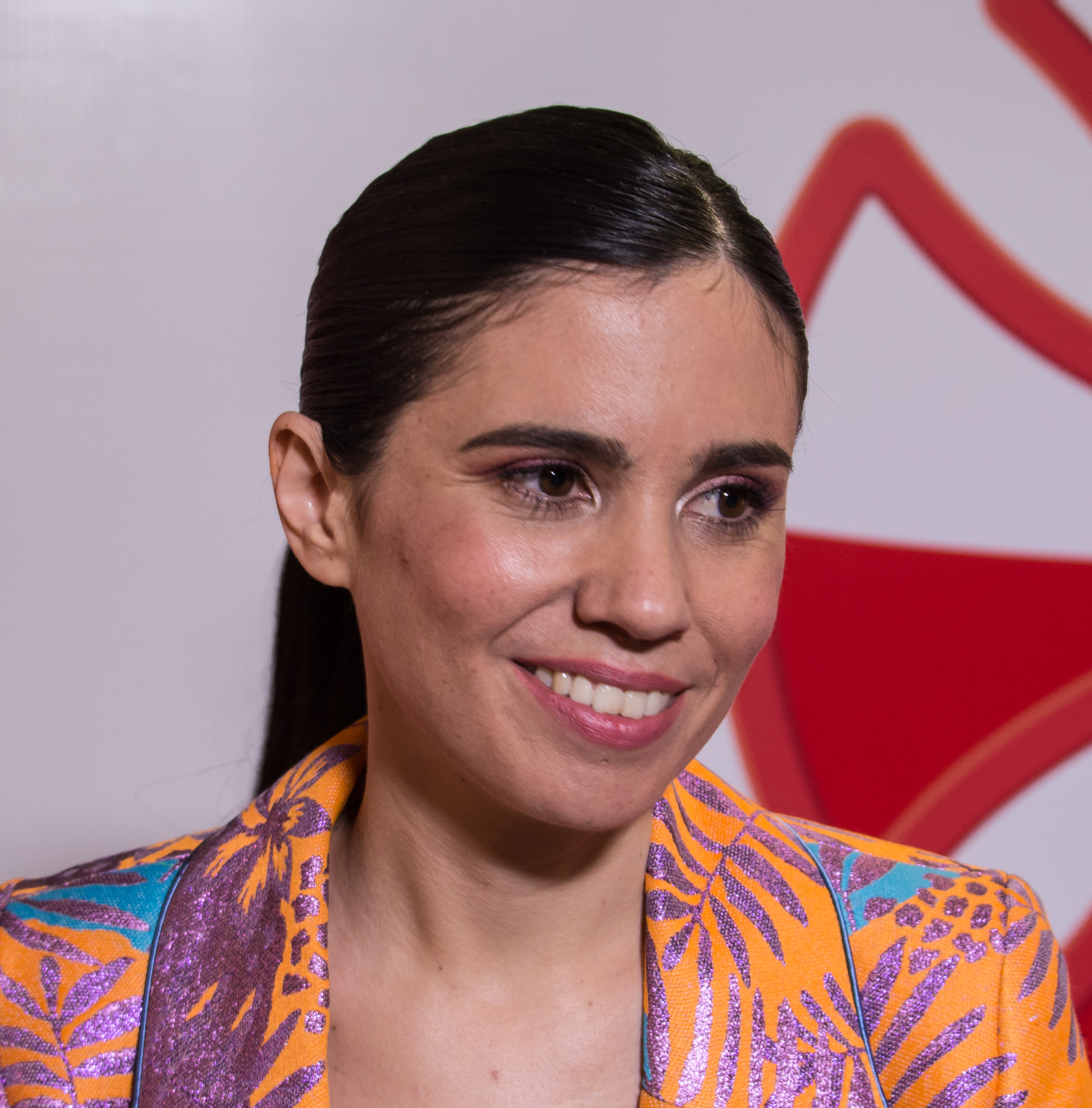
Mena at Teletón 2018 in Teatro Teletón, Santiago, Chile, December 2018

In October 2014, Javiera Mena released her third album, Otra Era. This album marks the search of the artist for a heavy 1980s disco sound, with a wider use of synthesizers and more danceable beats than her previous work. Also, this stage reflects a bigger interest in the visual aspects of her career regarding music videos and live shows. The first single released was the song "Espada" ("Sword"), released in 2013, whose video (and lyrics) became widely popular due to its references to LGBT community. The video was directed by Luis Cerveró (part of the remarkable visual collective CANADA) and has more than two million views on YouTube and counting.

On the cover of the album Otra Era, Javiera appears in a black and white picture, wearing Eskimo sunglasses by designer André Courrèges (an item which later became an icon of Javiera) and showing full breasts. The cover was censored by the media and music and streaming services like iTunes and Spotify.

In 2015, she toured in Otra Era tour, taking its shows to Spain, Mexico, Peru and Chile.

She Lives In 2016, Javiera was invited to participate as a jury in the most popular music festival in Chile, Viña del Mar International Song Festival. She was also invited to play a show at the festival, which was broadcast on national TV and satellite international signal on A&E. Javiera arranged to make a very attractive and spectacular show for the night, including very colorful visuals, fancy garments and a set of numerous female dancers. The show was a gateway for a lot of people in the country (and in Latin America) who didn't know the work of Javiera, and the end of the show she said "I'm very happy to be here. It's very difficult to be an independent artist in Chile, and besides the numbers and sales, I make music because it comes from my soul, from my heart".

2016 marked 10 years of the career of Javiera Mena (since the release of Esquemas Juveniles, which she celebrated with a commemoration show in Santiago on September of the same year.

=== 2017–2020: Espejo ===
During 2017, Javiera signed a contract with Sony Music, to release a new album. Its first single "Dentro de mi" was showcased at November in Santiago.

Her fourth album called Espejo was released in April 2018.

In 2019, Javiera Mena performed at Coachella Music Festival in Indio, CA.

=== 2021–2023: I. Entusiasmo and Nocturna ===
Javiera released her first digital EP called I. Entusiasmo in 2021 with five songs.

As Javiera Mena has been living in Spain for quite a while, she was invited to participate in the inaugural edition of Benidorm Fest 2022, Spain's national selection for the widely-known Eurovision Song Contest. She performed in the second semi-final with her song "Culpa" and earned 50 points, placing 6th and failing to qualify to the final.

Her fifth album, called Nocturna was released during October 2022 and she toured Spain, Chile, Argentina and Mexico in an exhausting promotion work.

=== 2024-present: Inmersión ===
On August 13, 2024, Mena released the song "Volver a Llorar" as the lead single of her upcoming sixth studio album. She released two more singles "Entropía" and "Mar de Coral". Her sixth studio album, Inmersión was officially released on April 23, 2025, on Géiser Discos, to critical acclaim.

== Artistry ==
Early in her career, Spanish canción melódica singer Jeanette was one of her biggest influences. While her initial music was indie pop, over the years she evolved towards an electropop sound that has come to define her modern career.

Mena is openly lesbian, which has influenced the content of her music. When asked about her "lesbian influences" in music in a 2019 interview, the singer mentioned the Argentine pop duo of Sandra Mihanovich and Celeste Carballo and their songs "Puerto Pollensa", "Soy lo que soy" and "Mujer contra mujer".

== Discography ==
=== Studio albums ===
- Esquemas Juveniles (2006)
- Mena (2010)
- Otra Era (2014)
- Espejo (2018)
- Nocturna (2022)
- Inmersión (2025)

EPs

- I. Entusiasmo (2021)

=== Singles ===
List of singles as lead artist
Title	Year	Peak chart positions	Album
Title	Year	CHL	Album
"Hasta la Verdad"	2010	—	Mena
"Primera Estrella"	2011	—	Mena
"No Te Cuesta Nada"	2012	—	Mena
"Luz de Piedra de Luna"	2012	—	Mena
"Espada"	2013	—	Otra Era
"La Joya"	2014	—	Otra Era
"Otra Era"	2014	—	Otra Era
"Sincronía, Pegaso"	2015	—	Otra Era
"Que Me Tome la Noche"	2015	—	Otra Era
"Dentro de Ti"	2017	—	Espejo
"Intuición" (feat. Li Saumet)	2018	—	Espejo
"Espejo"	2018	—	Espejo
"Alma"	2018	—	Espejo
"Mujer Contra Mujer"	2019	—	Non-album single
"Flashback"	2020	—	I. Entusiasmo
"Corazón Astral"	2020	—	I. Entusiasmo
"Entre las Dos" (with Miranda!)	2020	—	Non-album single
"Dos"	2021	—	I. Entusiasmo
"Debilidad"	2021	—	Nocturna
"Culpa"	2021	—	Nocturna
"Dunas" (with Myriam Hernández)	2021	—	Nocturna
"La Isla de Lesbos"	2022	—	Nocturna
"Me Gustas Tú"	2022	—	Nocturna
"Ya No Hay Verano" (feat. Depresión Sonora)	2023	—	Non-album single
"Volver a Llorar"	2024	—	Inmersión
"Peligrosa" (versión Aeróbica)	2024	—	Non-album single
"Entropía"	2024	—	Inmersión
"Mar de Coral" (with Santiago Motorizado)	2025	—	Inmersión
"Cuando Respiro en Tu Boca" (with Camila Moreno)	2025	—	Non-album single
"—" denotes a recording that did not chart or was not released in that territory.

==== As featured artist ====
List of singles as featured artist
Title	Year	Peak chart positions	Album
Title	Year	CHL	Album
"Novias" (El Guincho feat. Javiera Mena)	2012	—	Non-album singles
"Fe" (Jorge González feat. Various Artists (Note: Manuel García, Gonzalo Yañez, Gepe, Álvaro Henríquez, Roberto Márquez, Javiera Mena, Claudio Parra & Pedropiedra))	2015	—	Non-album singles
"Vicios y Defectos" (Dorian feat. Javiera Mena)	2018	—	Justicia Universal
"La Quietud del Movimiento" (Meteoros feat. Javiera Mena)	2019	—	Meteoros+
"Amor Libre" (Esteman feat. Javiera Mena)	2019	—	Non-album single
"Yin Yang" (Gianluca feat. Javiera Mena)	2019	—	Yin Yang
"Contigo" (Roberta Nikita feat. Javiera Mena)	2019	—	Baby EP
"Sin Azules ni Turquesas" (Rap Mexicano feat. Akil Ammar & Javiera Mena)	2019	—	Non-album single
"Cola de Pez (Fuego)" (Miss Caffeina feat. Javiera Mena & La Casa Azul)	2019	—	Oh Long Johnson 2.0
"La Fuerza del Amor" (versión Premios Pulsar 2020) (Various Artists (Note: Denise (Aguaturbia), Dulce y Agraz, Elizabeth Morris, Entrópica, Fakuta, Fran Straube, Javiera Mena, Javiera Parra, La Pájara, Natisú, Nicole, Palmenia Pizarro, Yael Meyer, and Yorka.))	2020	—	Non-album single
"Brasa" (Spanish version) (Jade Baraldo feat. Javiera Mena)	2020	—	Dose EP
"Amuleto" (Marilina Bertoldi feat. Javiera Mena)	2022	—	Mojigata
"Fotonovela" (Mœnia feat. Javiera Mena)	2022	—	Stereo Hits Vol. 2
"Cámara Lenta" (Depresión Sonora feat. Javiera Mena)	2023		Non-album single
"Unx de Nosotrxs" (Álex Anwandter feat. Javiera Mena)	2023	—	El diablo en el cuerpo
"Santo Domingo" (Emmanuel Horvilleur feat. Javiera Mena and Ale Sergi)	2025	—	Non-album single
"—" denotes a recording that did not chart or was not released in that territory.

=== Other appearances ===
List of other appearances, showing other performing artists, year released, and album name
Title	Year	Other performer(s)	Album
"Elígeme"	2004	Vigliensoni	Nata
"Sol de Invierno"	2005		Panorama Neutral
"Cámara Lenta"	2005		Departamentos Vacíos. Banda Sonora de Se Arrienda
"Pepper"	2006	Mismos	Caspana
"Ausencia" (Note: Violeta Parra cover.)	2007	Diego Morales	Cantores que Reflexionan: Sintiendo a Violeta
"IOA"	2007	Lucas Martí	Papá
"Por Él a Vos, por Vos a Ella"	2007	Lucas Martí	Papá
"Amiga"	2008	Pol del Sur, Jorge González	Efectos Espaciales
"Date y Dame"	2008	Lucas Martí	Pon en Práctica tu Ley
"Lienza"	2010	Gepe	Audiovisión
"Niño Samik"	2010	Tikitiklip	Tikitiklip Precolombino
"Ya No Quieras Comprenderlo Todo"	2011	Lucas Martí	Se Puede
"Sueños"	2011		Peace
"La Vida No Es Eterna" (Note: Caifanes cover.)	2011		Nos Vamos Juntos: Un Tributo A Las Canciones De Caifanes-Jaguares
"Hasta la Verdad" (Rebolledo Remix)	2011		Chilean Pop
"Nah de Nah" (Note: Spanish-lyrics cover version of “Non, je ne regrette rien” by Edith Piaf.)	2012		Joven y Alocada Original Soundtrack
"Amiga Mía" (Note: Los Prisioneros cover.)	2012		Joven y Alocada Original Soundtrack
"Perdiendo el Poder" (Note: "Perdiendo el Poder" was originally recorded around 2009 for the documentary H2O-cero (Aguacero). It was first included on an official disc in 2012 as part of the five-track promotional CD Victoria, released in conjunction with Calzados Victoria in Spain.)	2012		Victoria
"Un Día Contigo"	2012	Akil Ammar	Postdata
"Nuestros Colores"	2012	Olga	Gracias Tonales
"Necesito Cambiar"	2013	Dapuntobeat	I/O
"Novias"	2013	El Guincho	Young Turks 2012
"Culebra, Columna y Estatua"	2014	El Último Vecino	Tu Casa Nueva
"Vivir"	2015	Gepe	Estilo Libre
"Nubes de Fuego"	2018	Los Pilotos	Alianza Atlántica
"Time"	2018	John Grvy, DWYR	Gris
"Nada"	2018	Ruzzi, Vanessa Zamora	Nave Especial
"Disconformidad"	2019	Meteoros	Meteoros+
"Amores Perpetuos" (Note: Virus cover.)	2021	Alejandro Paz	Virus - Viaje de Placer
"Oye Mamá, Oye Papá (Mensaje de Navidad)" (Note: Jeanette cover.)	2023		Sonido Muchacho Ama la Navidad Vol. 1
"Átame"	2024	Lara91k	100pre Yoro
"Boomerang"	2024	Varry Brava	Sharirop
"Evangelion"	2025	Amore	Top Hits, Ballads, etc...
"Acelero"	2025	Mula	Eterna

== Awards and nominations ==
=== Major associations ===
==== Latin Grammy Awards ====
Year	Nominee / work	Award	Result
2015	"Otra Era"	Best Alternative Song	Nominated

==== MTV Europe Music Awards ====
Year	Nominated	Award	Result
2014	Javiera Mena	Best Latin America Central Act	Nominated
2015	Javiera Mena	Best Latin America Central Act	Nominated

==== MUSA Awards ====
Awards	Year	Category	Nominated work	Result	Ref.
MUSA Awards	2020	Music Video of the Year	"Flashback"	Nominated	
MUSA Awards	2020	Pop Act of the Year	Javiera Mena	Nominated	
MUSA Awards	2021	Pop Act of the Year	Javiera Mena	Nominated	
MUSA Awards	2023	Collaboration of the Year	"Unx de Nosotrxs" (with Alex Anwandter)	Nominated	

==== Premios Pulsar ====
Awards	Year	Category	Nominated work	Result	Ref.
Pulsar Awards	2015	Artist of the Year	Javiera Mena	Nominated	
Pulsar Awards	2015	Best Pop Act	Javiera Mena	Won	
Pulsar Awards	2015	Album of the Year	Otra Era	Nominated	
Pulsar Awards	2015	Song of the Year	"Otra Era"	Nominated	
Pulsar Awards	2019	Best Record Producer	Javiera Mena	Nominated	

=== Other associations ===
Awards	Year	Category	Nominated work	Result	Ref.
MIN Awards	2011	Best Chilean Act	Javiera Mena	Won	
Premios 40 Principales América	2014	Best Chilean Act	Javiera Mena	Nominated	
