= I. Entusiasmo =

EP by Javiera Mena
- Released: May 25, 2021
- Genre: Latin pop; synth-pop; dance-pop
- Length: 17:32
- Language: Spanish
- Label: Meni
- Producer: Javiera Mena; Pablo Stipicic

Javiera Mena chronology
Espejo (2018)	I. Entusiasmo (2021)	Nocturna (2022)

Singles from I. Entusiasmo
- 1. "Flashback" Released: March 27, 2020; 2. "Corazón Astral" Released: June 26, 2020; 3. "Dos" Released: March 18, 2021

I. Entusiasmo (Spanish: [entuˈsjasmo], lit. 'Enthusiasm') is the first extended play by Chilean singer-songwriter Javiera Mena, released independently on April 27, 2018.

== Background and release ==
Mena conceived the release of her first EP as a response to the challenges of the COVID-19 pandemic while she was living in Spain, prompting her to remain artistically present despite the lack of live performances. By this time, she already had an album's worth of songs complete, but following advice from her management, she opted to issue an EP rather than releasing a full album, as showcasing her new material this way would allow people pay more attention to the songs in an era of fleeting attention and information overload. The initial idea was for Entusiasmo to be the first of a two of extended plays; however, this plan ultimately did not materialize.

About her inspiration for this work, Mena commented: “The concepts of enthusiasm, passion, desire, and Eros bind all of the EP’s songs, which is why I chose that name.” She described a central drive to chase after something, whether directed toward another person or an action, as a recurring thread throughout the tracks. This impulse is tied to the broader philosophical notion of Eros—not limited to its sexual or carnal associations—but encompassing the motivating force that propels individuals to pursue and create. Mena also drew inspiration for I. Entusiasmo from the social unrest in Chile that began in 2019. She described this social event as one that "moved the people" and filled the streets with "a lot of enthusiasm and fire." This atmosphere directly influenced her search for a title word synonymous with "fire," leading her to choose "enthusiasm" for its evocative sound.

The songs on I. Entusiasmo were developed collaboratively with Chilean producer Pablo Stipicic. Mena sought to collaborate with him due to common affinity, as they belong to the same generation and similar things, commenting: "Pablo understands my ideas very fast and he understands that I’m very detail oriented. This is very important for me to make music, especially with a producer. So, we co-produced these songs." The only song not produced by Stipicic was "Flashback," produced by Stefan Storm of The Sound of Arrows.

Several tracks feature co-writing contributions from various collaborators: "Dos" was created with Mexican composer Marian Ruzzi, "Flashback" was co-written with Luis Jimenez of Los Mesoneros, "Pasión AKA Ilusión" was co-written with María Talaverano of Cariño, while "Diva" was authored with Spanish artist Chico Blanco. Mena framed these partnerships as part of a broader "desire to evolve," expressing increasing enjoyment in sharing creativity with others and viewing collaboration as an enriching daily process.

In August 2021, Mena released a deluxe edition of the EP including four additional remixes. "Diva" and Corazón Astral" from the EP ended up being included on Mena's follow-up album, Nocturna.

== Track listing ==
I. Entusiasmo track listing
No.	Title	Writer(s)	Producer(s)	Length
1.	"Flashback"	Javiera Mena; Luis Jiménez; Stefan Storm	Mena; Stefan Storm	3:02
2.	"Diva" (featuring Chico Blanco)	Mena; Pablo Cobo; Pablo Stipicic	Mena; Cobo; Stipicic	3:27
3.	"Corazón Astral"	Mena; Stipicic	Mena; Stipicic	3:12
4.	"Dos"	Mena; Marian Ruzzi	Mena; Stipicic	3:54
5.	"Pasión AKA Ilusión"	Mena; María Talaverano	Mena; Stipicic	3:58
Total length:				17:32

I. Entusiasmo — deluxe edition bonus tracks
No.	Title	Producer(s)	Length
6.	"Dos" (Vladi Cachai remix)	Vladimir Muñoz	3:38
7.	"Corazón Astral" (Alejandro Paz feat. Mamacita remix)	Alejandro Paz; Mamacita	5:36
8.	"Flashback" (Collrbone remix)	Collrbone	3:17
9.	"Pasión AKA Ilusión" (featuring Zoe Gotusso)	Pablo Stipicic	3:16
