= Diegors =

- Born: Diego Morales; 1982 (age 43–44); Santiago, Chile
- Occupations: Musician; songwriter; record producer
- Years active: 2003–present
- Musical career
- Labels: Luna; Quemasucabeza; Emociones; Cómeme

Diego Morales (1982), known artistically as Diegors, is a Chilean electronic musician, producer and DJ.

== Biography ==
As a teenager, he began playing music as a drummer and bassist in hardcore amateur bands. Upon finishing high school, he enrolled in a Bachelor’s Degree in Painting at the University of Chile, although he dropped out after two years, having lost interest in the academic structure. During this period he would meet the classmates with whom he would later form the psychedelic band Fredi Michel.

His solo career under his own name started with the debut album El Dub de Los Pobres, released in 2003 through Luna, the independent label founded by Cristian Heyne and Ottavio Berbakow. The album, which had only thirty physical copies produced, earned positive niche reviews, which allowed him to perform at important festivals such as Mutek in Canada, and the South American Music Conference (SAMC) in Buenos Aires, also earning him a spot on a compilation by the French label Autres Directions in Music. Due to sharing the same of group of friends involved in music, he later began collaborating with Javiera Mena being involved on her song "Perlas" from her first album Esquemas Juveniles, the remix for the track "Hambre," and a cover of "Ausencia" by Violeta Parra, which was included on the tribute album of the Chilean folklore artist. Additionally, he played the bass on Mena's live band following the release of Esquemas Juveniles. He also helped Mena in crafting her song "Hasta la Verdad," which would later become the lead single of her second album.

In 2007, he released his sophomore album, Calmao, through the Quemasucabeza label. By the time of this record, Morales had been exploring dance elements and South American rhythms for years, and had already debuted as a DJ in local parties. He was in the midst of this style transition when he met Chilean-German musician Matias Aguayo, with whom he developed a friendship and exchange that strengthened through the street parties known as Bumbumbox, organized sporadically by Aguayo and other South American producers in various Latin American cities—including Santiago, Buenos Aires, Montevideo, Bogotá, and Rio de Janeiro—, where Morales participated actively. Those parties evolved in 2009 into Cómeme, a label founded by Aguayo and Gary Pimiento to promote Latin producers internationally. Under the name Diegors, he released the track "O Sea, Hello!" on a various-artists vinyl in 2009, equally influenced by house and Latin rhythms like Colombian champeta. That same year, he toured Europe with the Cómeme collective, an experience he repeated in subsequent seasons alongside visits to Colombia and Argentina, building international prestige.

n 2011, Diegors was invited as a guest DJ on the New York radio program Beats in Space hosted by DFA Records-affiliated DJ Tim Sweeney.

In 2017, he released the 7-track EP Ultratumba, through Emociones Discos.

In 2018, he released Think About It, which compiled leftover ideas or discarded pieces composed between 2003 and 2008 after the release of his second album. He also co-founded Discos Pato Carlos with longtime friends and collaborators Andrea Paz and Alejandro Paz. It started to release the compilation Club Sauna Vol.1, documenting music from Santiago's Club Sauna party cycle—involving Chilean and other Latin American artists (established and emerging) whose work circulated but lacked official editions.

== Personal life ==
His brother, Ignacio "Nawito" Morales, is also a musician.
