= Nocturna (album) =

Studio album by Javiera Mena
- Released: September 30, 2022
- Genre: Latin pop; dance-pop; Italo disco
- Length: 36:01
- Language: Spanish
- Label: Meni; Sonido Muchacho
- Producer: Javiera Mena; Pablo Stipicic; Stefan Storm; Pablo Cobo

Javiera Mena chronology
I. Entusiasmo (2021)	Nocturna (2022)	Inmersión (2025)

Singles from Nocturna
- 1. "Debilidad" Released: September 30, 2021; 2. "Culpa" Released: October 22, 2021; 3. "Dunas" Released: December 3, 2021; 4. "La Isla de Lesbos" Released: June 10, 2022; 5. "Me Gustas Tú" Released: September 30, 2022

Nocturna (Spanish: [nokˈtuɾna], lit. 'Nocturnal') is the fifth studio album by Chilean singer-songwriter Javiera Mena, released independently on September 30, 2022, through Meni.

== Background ==
Mena's time under Sony Music, which led to the release her previous album, Espejo, was admittedly challenging. She experienced for the first time the industry's harsher, numbers-driven side, apart from being bombarded with external opinions, while also experiencing anxiety from an eagerness to evolve artistically. In spite of the fact that she felt satisfied with what Espejo became lyrically, due to the rush experienced during production, musically she did not feel fully satisfied with the result. This ultimately shifted her creative process amid changes in her personal life. She chose to revert to full independence and self-management, declaring it she valued the freedom it provided her, which led to the release of music through her own imprint, Meni.

== Conception ==
By the early 2020s she had relocated to Madrid, where she immersed herself in the local music scene and formed close ties with artists and collectives there. This period saw the release of several singles—including "Flashback" and "Corazón Astral", and others—as well as collaborations such as "Diva" with Chico Blanco, which were first presented as part of her first extended play I. Entusiasmo, as well as collaborations with established Latin pop acts such as Miranda!. Her participation in the Benidorm Fest with the song "Culpa" also introduced her music to a broader European audience.

In the midst of the COVID-19 pandemic, Mena initially considered structuring her material following Espejo as a series of two EPs, of which I. Entusiasmo would be the first installment. However, she ultimately opted for a full-length album, as she felt she had strong sense of conceptual cohesion with enough songs to justify a complete record, also considering that by this time she was no longer associated to a major label, so she really did not have to give further explanations other than that it was her personal preference.

== Themes ==
Mena described in Nocturna as an album in which she embraces her adulthood, commenting: "[It represents] a return to the musical side, to songwriting, to exploring new instruments and ways of composing. Conceptually and emotionally, I am connecting with my current womanhood, with my independence and expansion, with fun and with feminine pleasure. It is the enjoyment of the city, of myself, of my sexuality, my connection with [the Greek god] Eros." Thematically, Nocturna was conceived as a narrative-driven work, and since the beginning she had the idea of "a night, a beach, connecting with your dark side but also seeing light, whispers, spoken voice, a more opaque and vintage sound." The concept of desire is vastly explored on the record. This was explained by Mena as the kind that is "half-forbidden" and cannot be easily attained, and the idea of not despairing over it and enjoying the feeling instead. Reflecting on the complete product, she described the record as "a hedonistic album, deeply connected to darkness, and one that celebrates that darkness."

== Production and lyrics ==
Musically, Nocturna was described by Mena as chill-out album, influenced by 80's, 90's, and Italo disco elements. She also cited Sade, George Michael, and Lisa Stansfield as sources of inspiration for the record.

The album was co-produced by Mena and Pablo Stipicic, with Mena handling much of the initial programming and arrangement herself while collaborating closely with Stipicic on the bulk of the album's sound. Specific songs received additional production input: "Me gustas tú" was worked on with members of Cupido, while on "Diva" Chico Blanco apart from being featured on vocals, he also contributed to the track's production. With respect to the songwriting process, on this record Mena was also open to collaboration, commenting: "I began composing with new people because it felt more enjoyable. I got tired of working alone—there are other artists who really feed into my ideas and energize me." She received lyrical assistance from Leti Sala and, most notably, María Valverdina of the Spanish pop group Cariño, who helped ground Mena's characteristically ethereal and abstract lyrics in more everyday, relatable language. Other notable collaborations include "Dunas" which featured Chilean singer Myriam Hernandez, for whom Mena expressed deep admiration, explaining her decision to reach out to her as an attempt to honor and elevate Hernández's legacy as a fellow Chilean.

== Promotion ==
On September 30, 2021, Mena released a live version of "Debilidad"—her first new song to be featured on Nocturna—through a session on Colors, marking her as one of the first Spanish-speaking artists (and the first Chilean) to feature on the Berlin-based live series platform. On October 22, 2021, she released "Culpa," which served as the first studio single of the album. This was followed by "Dunas" featuring Myriam Hernandez, released in December of the same year. The following single from the album was the Lesbian-themed song "La Isla de Lesbos" released in June 2022.

The album was released on September 30, 2022, through Meni, and distributed in Spain by the label Sonido Muchacho. On the same day of the album release, Mena presented "Me Gustas Tú" as the follow-up single, releasing a music video for the track.

In 2024, the Chilean electronic duo Aeróbica released a remix of the album track "Peligrosa."

== Critical reception ==
Professional ratings
Review scores
Source	Rating
Mondo Sonoro	8/10 stars
Jenesaispop	7.4/10
Indie Rocks!	8/10 stars

Nocturna received positive reviews from critics. Mondo Sonoro gave the album an 8/10 rating, describing it as "a wonderful collection of hedonistic songs that flee from anything cold in every sense, frequently embracing humor and double entendres in a playful game between the innocent and the explicit." They named "Culpa" and "Diva" as standouts of the record, calling them absolute bangers, while deeming "Sombra” and “Me Gustas Tú" as its weakest points, but overall hailing the record as potentially the best album of Mena's career to date.

On the other hand, Jenesaispop gave the album a 7.4/10 rating. The site cited the track "Culpa" as a standout, deeming it "an example of pop sophistication" in spite of causing divisive reactions, as well as "Peligrosa," "Me Gustas Tú", and "Eclipse Total." In general, they praised how Mena maintained a high compositional quality throughout the record, even if at certain moments it felt less convincing (namely, the tracks "Diva," "Sombra," and "Dunas"). Despite these reservations, they concluded that Nocturna remains solidly enjoyable and characteristically well-executed, reinforcing Mena's reputation as a gifted pop auteur who never settles for mediocrity.

== Track listing ==
All tracks produced by Javiera Mena and Pablo Stipicic, unless otherwise noted.

Nocturna track listing
No.	Title	Writer(s)	Producer(s)	Length
1.	"La Isla de Lesbos"	Héctor Mena; Javiera Mena; Pepe Portilla	Mena; Pablo Stipicic; Stefan Storm	3:09
2.	"Debilidad"	Gianluca Abarza; Mena; Stipicic		3:02
3.	"Peligrosa"	Mena; Stipicic		3:00
4.	"Sombra"	Mena; Leticia Salas		3:05
5.	"Diva" (featuring Chico Blanco)	Mena; Pablo Cobo; Stipicic	Mena; Cobo; Stipicic	3:26
6.	"Dunas" (featuring Myriam Hernández)	Mena; María Talaverano; Stipicic		4:04
7.	"Me Gustas Tú"	Mena; Luis Sansó Gil; Toni Díaz García		2:29
8.	"Eclipse Total"	Mena; Talaverano		2:37
9.	"Corazón Astral"	Mena; Stipicic		3:15
10.	"Sincronización"	Mena		4:28
11.	"Culpa"	Mena		3:21
Total length:				36:01

== Release history ==
Release dates and formats of Nocturna
Region	Date	Format	Label	Ref.
Worldwide	September 30, 2022	Digital download; streaming	Meni	
Chile	September 30, 2022	CD; vinyl	M&E Discos	
Spain	September 30, 2022	CD; vinyl	Sonido Muchacho	
Mexico	September 30, 2022	CD; vinyl	La Roma Records	
