= Villa Dulce =

Chilean animated TV series

- Genre: Animation; Comedy
- Created by: Beatriz Buttazzoni and Francisco Bobadilla
- Composer: Cristian Heyne
- Country of origin: Chile
- Original language: Spanish
- No. of seasons: 2
- No. of episodes: 26

Production
- Running time: 15 minutes (S1); 22 minutes (S2)
- Production company: Blanco Producciones

Original release
- Network: Canal 13; UCV Televisión
- Release: March 6, 2004 – December 14, 2005

Villa Dulce (English: Sweet Village) is a Chilean animated series created by Beatriz Buttazzoni and Francisco Bobadilla of Empatía Productions in 2004 and broadcast in Canal 13 network. Villa Dulce was a historical series in Chile because it was the first animated TV program made in the country since Condorito's shorts in the 80s.

Since its debut on March 6, 2004 the show has broadcast 26 episodes and 2 specials and was a strong influence for the creation of others Chilean animation series after Villa Dulce success, like Clarita, Diego y Glot, Pulentos and El Ojo del Gato.

== Settings ==
Villa Dulce idea was planned by Beatriz Buttazzoni and Francisco Bobadilla around 2003, inspired by his own experiences in the original town that they live, Villa Dulce in Viña del Mar (also two scriptwriters of the series lives there) but instead of use the same place, they created a fictional town called "Villa Dulce" who resembles Santiago de Chile. This community is governed by a mayor called Tuscan Epifanio and where 13 children between 8 and 11 years and some adults lives.

Villa Dulce stands out to portray the situations that the children of 11 years old experiment in the country, including situations that the creators of Villa Dulce call "kiddie black humor", this is, as how they imagines the reality according to the glance of the children with situations like the end of the world, reality shows, the UFOs, and others issues. In addition Villa Dulce includes some characters who represent generally the stereotypes of the Chilean society like the high-class (cuicos), low class (flaites) and tweens.

The series has been heavily compared with the American animated series South Park, Francisco Bobadilla has denied the similarities:

I think that the comparison is because of the economy of movements that Beatriz is working in the visual development, more than the script. But we don't like that comparison, because the tone of South Park is different, independently of we like that series or not. Villa Dulce was made with a too illogical time for be just animated cartoons. Furthermore, we have much more expressive faces than South Park, maybe yes in the economy of movements we can be seemed, but in the tone, we are different, Villa Dulce plays with the logic of kiddie black humor, but based in the spontaneity of the children.

— Francisco Bobadilla

== See also ==
- 2004 in television
