= Inmersión =

Studio album by Javiera Mena
- Released: April 23, 2025
- Genres: Dream pop; Latin pop
- Length: 31:25
- Language: Spanish
- Label: Géiser Discos
- Producers: Javiera Mena; Isidro Acedo; Francisco Victoria; Pablo Stipicic

Javiera Mena chronology
Nocturna (2022)	Inmersión (2025)

Singles from Inmersión
- 1. "Volver a Llorar" Released: August 13, 2024; 2. "Entropía" Released: October 17, 2024; 3. "Mar de Coral" Released: February 18, 2025

Inmersión (Immersion) is the sixth studio album by Chilean singer-songwriter, and record producer Javiera Mena. It was released on April 23, 2025, under the record label, Géiser Discos. The album consists of ten tracks, including the singles "Volver a Llorar", "Entropía", and "Mar de Coral" which features vocals from Argentine singer Santiago Motorizado, vocalist of the rock band El Mató a un Policía Motorizado.

== Background ==
In an interview with LOS40, Javiera Mena explained the meaning behind the record. She also described it as "an album that radiates tranquility and luminosity", and "that invites the listener to connect with my music and what I do, in a deeper way."

“Inmersión evokes the idea of immersing ourselfs in a deep emotional state, going through pain and, at the same time, having the courage to emerge to see life with a new perspective."

— Javiera Mena, on the meaning of her new album to LOS40.

== Promotion ==
To promote the record three singles were released:

The lead single "Volver a Llorar" was released on August 13, 2024, alongside its music video.

"Entropía" served as the album second single, and was released on October 17, 2024.

"Mar de Coral", a duet with Argentine singer and vocalist of El Mató a un Policía Motorizado, Santiago Motorizado, was released as the album third single on February 18, 2025.

Days before the album release, Mena collaborated with Chilean beauty queen Cecilia Bolocco on her new campaign promoting her clothes collection, which features Mena's music.

== Reception ==
Inmersión was met with critical acclaim from music critics upon release.

Marcelo Contreras of La Tercera, dubbed the record as "outstanding" and called it Mena's best body of work to date. He stated that the record "follows the rules written since The Beatles, where every song contains a purpose."

Daniela Aguayo from La Cuarta described Inmersión as Mena's most introspective album to date, praising the songstress for showing a more "sensitive and emotionally" side of her, while remaining "faithful to her poetic and creative identity".

Writing for Jenesaispop, Sebas E. Alonso gave the album an 8.2 out of 10, saying that the album is the first in a long-time where the singer-songwriter sounds "concentrated on the record's composition" rather than "overwhelmed by delivering a new hit." He went further praising Mena's production and the lyrical content.

== Track listing ==
All music is composed by Javiera Mena.

Inmersión track listing
No.	Title	Writer(s)	Producer(s)	Length
1.	"Palacio de Hielo"	Javiera Mena; Luis Sancho	Javiera Mena; Isidro Acedo	3:05
2.	"Na Na Na"	Mena; Sancho	Mena; Acedo	3:05
3.	"Pez en el Agua"	Mena; Sancho	Mena; Acedo; Francisco Victoria	3:09
4.	"Reina de la Selva"	Mena; Héctor Mena; Pepe Portilla	Mena; Acedo	3:21
5.	"Claro de Luna"	Mena; Sancho	Mena; Acedo	2:42
6.	"Volver a Llorar"	Mena; Pablo Stipicic	Mena; Acedo	2:39
7.	"Esta Ciudad"	Mena; Victoria	Mena; Victoria	3:04
8.	"Mar de Coral" (with Santiago Motorizado)	Mena; Luis Sansó	Mena; Acedo	3:55
9.	"Absurda"	Mena; Sancho	Mena; Acedo	3:11
10.	"Entropía"	Mena; Stipicic	Mena; Acedo; Pablo Stipicic	3:10
Total length:				31:25

== Personnel ==
Credits adapted from Apple Music.

- Javiera Mena — lead vocals; performer; songwriter; executive producer (all tracks)
- Isidro Acedo — executive producer (1–6,8-10); programming (1–5,9)
- Luis Sancho — songwriter (1–3,5,9); electric guitar (1–3,9)
- Francisco Victoria — songwriter (7); producer (3,7); flute (3); bass guitar (3); electric guitar (7); programming (7) mixing engineer (7)
- Pablo Stipicic — songwriter (6,10); producer (10); mixing engineer (1–6,8-10)
- Marcelo Wilson — string arrangements (1,2,6,8,9)
- Kevin Peterson — mastering engineer (all tracks)
- Héctor Mena — songwriter (4)
- Pepe Portilla — songwriter (4)
- Luis Sansó — songwriter (8), electric guitar (8)
- Stephanie Donkicke — lead vocals (5), bass guitar (5), electric guitar (5)
- Santiago Motorizado — lead vocals (8)
- Alba Moreno — background vocals (4)
- Sebastián Hernández Zarauz — piano (1–3,5,9)
- Xoan Domínguez Bretaña — drums (1–3,5,9)
- Javaxa Flores — violin (1,2,8,9)
- Makarena Mendoza — violin (1,2,8,9)
- María Fernanda Prieto — violin (6,9)
- Annemarie Orth — violin (6,9)
- Priscilla Valenzuela — viola (1,2,8,9)
- Mariel Godoy — viola (6,9)
- Valentina del Canto — cello (1,2,8,9)
- Carla Seron — cello (6,9)

== Release history ==
Release dates and formats of Inmersión
Region	Date	Format	Label	Ref.
Worldwide	23 April 2025	CD; vinyl; digital download; streaming	Géiser Discos	

== See also ==
- List of 2025 albums
