= Diego & Glot =

- Diego and Glot promotional image (up, Diego, down, Glot)
- Genre: Animation
- Created by: Claudio Kreutzberger; Sebastián Correa; José Tomás "Cote" Correa
- Voices of: Rodolfo Vásquez; Dan Rodriguez; Marcela Arroyave; Cristían Carvajal; Eduardo Valenzuela; Soledad Guerrero; Vanesa Silva; René Pinochet; Viviana Navarro; Sandro Larenas; Juan Quezada; Sebastián Correa; Jaime Alfredo Nuñez; Ana Domínguez (S2)
- Theme music composer: Nicolas Torres
- Composers: Cristian Freund (S1); Miguel Lara (S2)
- Country of origin: Chile
- Original language: Spanish
- No. of seasons: 2
- No. of episodes: 22

Production
- Executive producer: Claudio Kreutzberger
- Running time: 22–24 minutes

Original release
- Network: Canal 13
- Release: September 3, 2005 – August 23, 2009

Diego and Glot (sometimes stylized as Diego & Glot; Spanish: Diego y Glot) is a Chilean animated series created by Claudio Kreutzberger, nephew of Don Francisco, in 2005, with the collaboration of Sebastián Correa and José Tomás Correa of CuboNegro studios, for Canal 13. Diego and Glot is the first hand-drawn animation TV series made in Chile since the Condorito shorts in the 1980s (excluding Villa Dulce, which was released before Diego and Glot, but it was made with CGI). Satirical humor, cultural references and real famous public people of the country is recurrently featured in the show.

Since its debut on September 3, 2005 the show aired two seasons consisting of 20 episodes. In 2005, CuboNegro announced that they were working on a feature-length film, though a film was never released.

== Overview ==
Diego y Glot takes place in Santiago, Chile and shows the Plá Perez, a dysfunctional family center on the youngest child, Diego Plá, and his pet, a green quiltro dog named Glot. Original creator Claudio Kreutzberger designed Diego and Glot as a "reflection of the modern Chilean youth".

== Characters ==
=== Plá Perez Family ===
- Diego Plá Perez (voiced by Rodolfo Vásquez): a 11-year-old kid. He owns a great imagination and is very anxious. He does everything for fulfill his dreams and wishes, even if that attracts problems to his family.
- Glot (voiced by Dan Rodriguez): a 2 years old green quiltro dog. He is Diego's best friend.
- Armando Pla (voiced by Cristían Carvajal): the father of Diego and Lalo. He calls himself a "frustrated painter" and, for that reason, he became a cartoonist. He works for the "La Ración" newspaper (a parody of La Nación).
- Esmirna Pérez (voiced by Marcela Arroyave): the mother of Diego and Lalo. She is very hyperactive.
- Lalo (voiced by Eduardo Valenzuela): Diego's older brother. He is popular with the girls and somewhat lazy. His dream is to become a rockstar.
- Abuela Margarita (voiced by Soledad Guerrero): Diego's paternal grandmother. She is considered "crazy" by his family. She has Alzheimer's disease.

=== Diego's Friends ===
- Ismael Droguett (voiced by René Pinochet): He is very intelligent and helps Diego to find ingenious solutions to his problems.
- Danilo Paniagua (voiced by Vanesa Silva): A fat friend of Diego. He is very disorderly and find a lot of problems easily.
- Violeta Ochoa (voiced by Viviana Navarro): A girl and Diego's friend from school. She is very cute and is mostly the center of attention of Diego's friends because of her beauty. She loves soccer and lives on the same street of Diego.

=== Others ===
- José (voiced by Sandro Larenas)
- Don Rudén (voiced by Juan Quezada
- Inspector Cáceres (voiced by Sebastián Correa)
- Dueño de Avasallador (voiced by Jaime Alfredo Nuñez)

=== Guest stars ===
- Los Prisioneros
- Iván Zamorano
- Aldo Schiappacasse
- Luciano Bello
- Florcita Motuda
- Don Francisco
- Pedro Carcuro
- Ricardo Lagos
- Raúl Hasbún
- Julio Martínez
- Mario Banderas

== Production ==
Diego y Glot uses a sitcom style of storyboards and was heavily inspired by other animated series that lampoon aspects of the human condition, specially The Simpsons and Hey Arnold!. Diego and Glot also uses "guest stars" or cameo appearances of famous people or groups in Chile, like the music band Los Prisioneros, ex-Chilean president Ricardo Lagos or TV animator Don Francisco.

The first season consist of 10 chapters transmitted between September 3 and October 1, 2005 on the Chilean TV station Canal 13. The second season started on July 13, 2009.

== Episodes ==
=== First season (2005) ===
#	Originally aired	Episode name
1 - 1.01	September 3, 2005	Kiltro
2 - 1.02	September 3, 2005	Super Familia
3 - 1.03	September 10, 2005	Mala Pata
4 - 1.04	September 10, 2005	Vacaciones
5 - 1.05	September 17, 2005	Doble Cuerpo
6 - 1.06	September 17, 2005	Circo
7 - 1.07	September 24, 2005	Vigilante
8 - 1.08	September 24, 2005	Astronauta
9 - 1.09	October 1, 2005	Tolerancia
10 - 1.10	October 1, 2005	Mi Comunidad

=== Second season (2009) ===
#	Originally aired	Episode name
11 - 2.01	July 13, 2009	El reencuentro
12 - 2.02	July 14, 2009	Una historia de piratas
13 - 2.03	July 15, 2009	Ser o no ser
14 - 2.04	July 16, 2009	Esmirna taxista
15 - 2.05	July 17, 2009	Abuela al asilo
16 - 2.06	July 27, 2009	Diego presidente
17 - 2.07	August 2, 2009	Diario de Violeta
18 - 2.08	August 9, 2009	La banda de Diego
19 - 2.09	August 16, 2009	Donde las papas queman
20 - 2.10	August 23, 2009	Mi hermano Lalo

== Planned film ==
On September 13, 2005, Canal 13 confirmed the production of a feature-length movie based on Diego and Glot with the help of Canal 13 Films, who also worked with Cine Animadores on Papelucho and the Martian and Pulentos: The Movie. The film was originally produced for release in 2007, nevertheless the opening was delayed indefinitely. As of 2009, the release date hasn't been confirmed.
