= Dënver =

Chilean pop duo

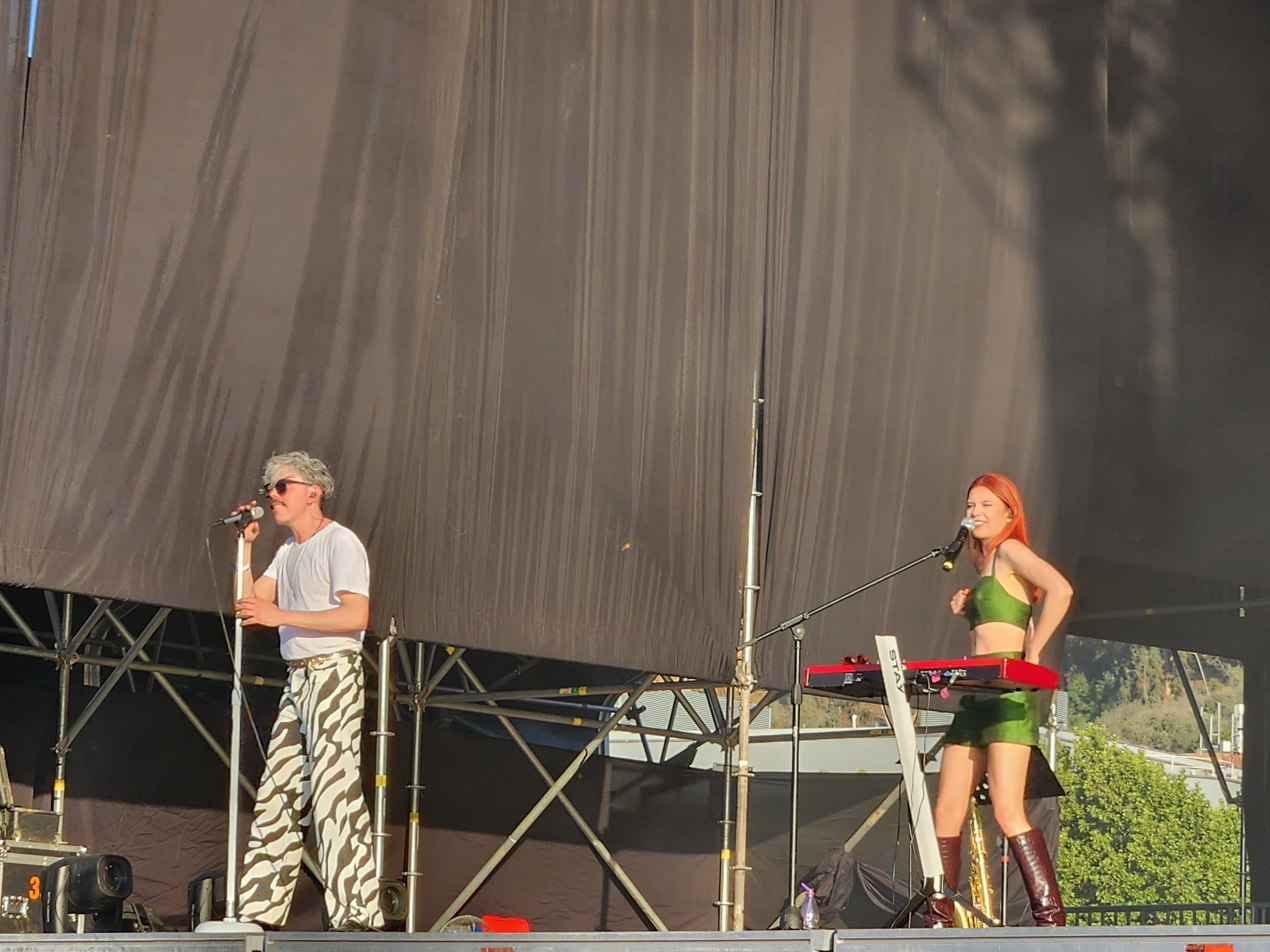
- Dënver performing at Fauna Primavera in 2024

Background information
- Origin: San Felipe, Chile
- Genres: Indie pop; soft rock; baroque pop; dance-pop
- Years active: 2004–2018; 2023–present
- Labels: Neurotyka; Cazador; Feria Music; Precordillera; Umami
- Members: Mariana Montenegro; Milton Mahan

Dënver is a Chilean vocal and instrumental duo consisting of Mariana Montenegro (born September 8, 1987) and Milton Mahan (born December 15, 1985).

== Biography ==
=== Early years and formation ===
Mariana Montenegro and Milton Mahan both grew up in San Felipe, Chile. Montenegro began writing songs at an early age—around 11 years old, and was initially part of a group called Montychicas, which included her cousins, sisters, and a friend. While in high school, she was involved in several bands in San Felipe, and attended a couple of rehearsals with Punk Dolls, a band led by Milton Mahan whose sound at the time featured Sonic Youth-inspired distorted guitar work. Around this time is when they started creating music together under the name Dënver. Graham commented: "[Montenegro] was on keyboards and I was on guitar, and songs just started coming out without us really planning it; suddenly the project was taking shape and we decided to give it a name and start playing live." The origin of the band name has often been linked to Jack Kerouac's novel On the Road, but that connection is more of a convenient story than the real starting point. During this period, they also developed a romantic relationship, which lasted for about a year and a half. Even after their romance ended, the two continued making music together.

=== Solenöide and Totoral ===
In 2006, they released their debut EP, Solenöide, which was captured on a four-track cassette recorder using chrome tape. The physical copies of the EP were handmade—photocopied covers that the duo painted themselves on cardboard.

After finishing high school, Montenegro moved to Santiago to study music. Mahan, who had been studying art in Valparaíso but was growing frustrated with university, dropped out. When Montenegro relocated to the capital, Mahan followed her. To support themselves they took whatever jobs they could find, and both of them performed as street musicians on public buses. In early 2008, they were invited to open for José González' first concert in Chile held at Cine Normandie. Their first full-length album, Totoral, produced by Pondie of the band Niñoboy and mastered by Gabriel Lucena of Entre Ríos, was released in late April of that year via indie label Neurotyka.

=== Música, Gramática, Gimnasia and international reach ===
In 2010, working with producer Cristián Heyne, they recorded their second album, Música, Gramática, Gimnasia, this time via indie label Cazador. The duo highlighted several key differences in the creative and production process compared to their debut. For Totoral, everything was done under very limited conditions: recorded in a home studio with low-end equipment (a basic microphone, a simple sound card), under time pressure, and with mixing that stretched over nearly a year. At that point, Mahan also lacked knowledge on sound engineering, so producer Pondie was the only one with technical knowledge guiding the sessions. By contrast, Música, Gramática, Gimnasia aimed for a richer, more organic instrumentation. The band deliberately moved away from heavily programmed drums toward live drums, more prominent guitars and bass, and the inclusion of brass and strings. They wanted orchestral arrangements, and thanks to Montenegro’s formal music studies, she was able to clearly communicate and notate the ideas to the session musicians who participated in the recordings. Upon its release, the album earned wide praise for its polished yet slightly heavier guitar-driven pop songs. This year, they also were approached to be opening act for Belle and Sebastian in Chile.

As the band gained momentum following the success of their second album, both members maintained parallel activities closely tied to music. Mahan was involved in other musical projects, including Nueva Orleans and De Janeiros, apart from working as a record producer, most notably for fellow Chilean artist Fakuta. Montenegro, trained as a musicologist, combined her work in the band with cultural management and organizational roles in the music scene. In April 2011, they performed for the first time in Spain, followed by a 5-venue tour in July. At the end of 2011, they released a remix EP of Música, Gramática, Gimnasia.

From 2011 onward, Dënver began performing internationally, touring countries including Mexico, Spain, Argentina and Colombia, while continuing to return to Chile for major appearances. These included their performance at the inaugural edition of Lollapalooza Chile, and a release show for their second album at Centro Cultural Matucana 100, featuring a brass and strings orchestra.

=== Fuera de Campo, split announcement and Sangre Cita ===
In June 2013, the band released their third album, Fuera de Campo, among certain adversities. Recorded primarily in a home studio in Ñuñoa, Santiago, with additional string sessions in Mexico, the album was self-produced by Mahan, who also handled most of the songwriting and arrangements alongside Montenegro. Mahan chose to take on the role of producer himself, primarily because the band lacked the budget to hire a renowned producer and because, aside from Cristián Heyne, they did not know any other local producer whose musical vision aligned with their own. With respect to the album release, Dënver experienced various difficulties. Initially it was planned to be released through Feria Music, but this was marred by various irregularities, including the label informing the duo that the physical copies for selling would not be ready in time for the release date and at their sold-out album presentation at Teatro Cariola, as the master had been damaged en route to the United States for manufacturing. This made the duo decide to subsequently self-release the album through their own label, Precordillera. Feria Music declared bankruptcy shortly afterward, leaving many Chilean artists besides Dënver—including Álex Anwandter, Francisca Valenzuela, 31 Minutos, and Los Tres—without owed royalties or proper support.

In September 2013, shortly after the release of the music video for "Las Fuerzas", the last single from Fuera de Campo, the duo issued a surprise statement announcing they would go into an indefinite hiatus following the end of their Mexican tour. Further explaining this decision, Mahan stated that he preferred to seek a new musical collaborator since he had been solely responsible for the songwriting up to that point, stating: "It had already become very complicated to keep working together, so I prefer to look for another bandmate, someone who can make a real musical contribution, since up until now I have been writing all the songs on my own. Who knows, maybe at some point we could get back together, but right now it was impossible to continue." Mariana Montenegro, however, expressed that she did not fully agree with the dissolution, stating: “It makes me really sad, because we had built something really cool. But we had a lot of differences in what each of us wanted in life, and from my side there wasn’t much I could do. When you spend so much time with someone, maybe you cannot grow properly, so it is better to separate.” Mahan and Montenegro ended up reconciling during the Mexico tour, and later they recanted their statement, acknowledging that the initial decision to disband had been impulsive. They commented they would continue working both as Dënver as well as working together on their independent label Precordillera —which at the time was working on releasing material for artists such as Colombina Parra and Prehistöricos— but on the personal level, they stopped living together after 4 years, and limited their encounters to merely work-related matters.

In 2014, they resumed activities and performed at the Primavera Sound festival in Barcelona, followed by a short Spanish tour. A few weeks before the European tour, they made available for free download on their website an EP titled Remixes de Campo, featuring new remixes of six tracks from their third album, and also released a cover version of Juan Gabriel’s “Pero Qué Necesidad.” This same year, Dënver contributed the original soundtrack to the Chilean animated short film Bear Story directed by Gabriel Osorio, which would later win the Academy Award for Best Animated Short Film at the 88th Academy Awards.

In 2015, the duo released their fourth album, Sangre Cita, through their newly-born own label, Umami. Produced by the duo De Janeiros—formed by Mahan and Pablo Muñoz—the album was preceded by the singles "Noche Profunda"—which was used as the main theme song for Zamudio: Solos en la noche, the TVN series based on the murder of Daniel Zamudio,; “Los Vampiros” featuring (Me Llamo) Sebastián; and, following the album release, with “Mai Lov.” Sangre Cita showcased a more dance-oriented side of the band, somewhat stepping away from the baroque pop that defined their earlier work. Later that same year, they presented Turismo Aventura, a documentary directed by Bernardo Quesney. The film followed the duo across various locations in Chiloé, Chile, where they also performed acoustic versions of several of their songs in open-air settings or unique venues. The full documentary was made available to view on the official Red Bull Chile website.

In 2016, Dënver were named Cultural Ambassadors of San Felipe by the mayor and municipal authorities. At the time of this recognition, Mahan highlighted how their music reflects the town's geography, positive and negative experiences, and history, noting that San Felipe frequently comes up in conversations with audiences in Chile and abroad. On the other hand, Montenegro expressed gratitude for the acknowledgment of their work and hoped it would help create opportunities for future musicians in there.

In 2017, the duo toured in China for the first time, performing live at the Chengdu Youth Festival, as well as concerts in Beijing and Shanghai. Through the Umami label, Dënver also worked producing records for fellow indie pop act Playa Gótica and the duo Paisaje.

=== Hiatus and solo projects ===
The duo announced their separation in 2018, so each member could focus on their individual careers.

Mariana Montenegro released her first solo single "Suave" in 2018, followed by a series of tracks that formed her debut album La Mar in 2020, which leaned toward a more electronic sound. Over the following years she continued collaborating with various producers, including Vicente Sanfuentes on “Un poquito más,” a song that later appeared on her 2025 album Ingrávida.

Mahan adopted the stage name Milton James, issuing introductory EPs before releasing his full-length album Pretemporada in 2019. He also maintained his career as music producer and worked with the duo De Janeiros. In 2023, he released Recado Mistral, a tribute album to the poetry of Gabriela Mistral. In 2024, he released the single "Mishima", in which he drew inspiration from Japanese literature, blending electropop with sounds influenced by Japanese music.

=== Reunion and new chapter ===
After a five-year absence from the stage since 2018, Dënver reunited in December 2023 for a sold-out concert at Teatro Coliseo to celebrate the tenth anniversary of Fuera de Campo. The event reignited interest in the band, and marked the beginning of a series of performances across Chile, including appearances at high-profile events such as Feria Pulsar and the Festival REC in Concepción. Following the conclusion of their Chilean anniversary run, Dënver revealed plans for a tour in Mexico, bringing the Fuera de campo anniversary show to cities including Mexico City and Guadalajara. They also performed as the opening act for Paul McCartney's 2024 concert in Santiago.

In July 2025, the duo released "Bien tu mal", their first single in over a decade.

== Discography ==
=== Studio albums ===
Title	Album details
Totoral	Released: April 1, 2008; Label: Neurotyka; Formats: CD, digital download, streaming
Música, Gramática, Gimnasia	Released: October 27, 2010; Label: Cazador; Formats: CD, LP, digital download, streaming
Fuera de Campo	Released: June 20, 2013; Label: Precordillera; Formats: CD, LP, digital download, streaming
Sangre Cita	Released: October 5, 2015; Label: Umami; Formats: CD, LP, cassette, digital download, streaming

=== Extended plays ===
Title	Album details
Solenöide	Released: 2006; Label: Self-release; Formats: CD
Música, Gramática, Remixes	Released: December 2011; Label: Cazador; Formats: Digital download
Remixes de Campo	Released: May 2014; Label: Self-release; Formats: Digital download
Bear Story (Original Soundtrack)	Released: December 6, 2016; Label: Self-release; Formats: Digital download, streaming

=== Singles ===
List of singles as lead artist
Title	Year	Peak chart positions	Album
Title	Year	CHL	Album
"Andén 6"	2008	—	Totoral
"Los Menos"	2008	—	Totoral
"Los Adolescentes"	2010	—	Música, Gramática, Gimnasia
"Lo Que Quieras"	2011	—	Música, Gramática, Gimnasia
"Los Bikers"	2011	—	Música, Gramática, Gimnasia
"De Explosiones y Delitos"	2012	—	Música, Gramática, Gimnasia
"Los Surfistas Valientes" (Note: Released in Spain as part of a limited-edition vinyl for Record Store Day.)	2012	—	Non-album single
"Revista de Gimnasia"	2013	—	Fuera de Campo
"Profundidad de Campo"	2013	—	Fuera de Campo
"Medio Loca (Hasta el Bikini Me Estorba)"	2013	—	Fuera de Campo
"Las Fuerzas"	2013	—	Fuera de Campo
"Negro es el Color de su Corazón"	2013	—	Non-album single
"Noche Profunda"	2015	—	Sangre Cita
"Los Vampiros"	2015	—	Sangre Cita
"Mai Lov"	2015	—	Sangre Cita
"El Fondo del Barro"	2016	—	Sangre Cita
"Bien Tu Mal"	2025	—	Non-album singles
"A Pedacitos"	2025	—	Non-album singles
"—" denotes a recording that did not chart or was not released in that territory.

=== Other appearances ===
List of other appearances, showing other performing artists, year released, and album name
Title	Year	Other performer(s)	Album
"Andén 6"	2006		Neurotyka 2999, Volumen 1
"Miedo a Toparme Contigo"	2007		Neurotyka 2999, Volumen 2
"Paraíso de Menta"	2007		De atrás pica el indie, Volumen 1
"Los Turistas"	2008		Neurotyka 2999, Volumen 4
"Olas Gigantes"	2010		Fonogramáticos Vol.9
"9.6" (Note: La Bien Querida cover.)	2010		Fonogramáticos Vol.10: Nosotros los rockers
"De Explosiones y Delitos"	2011		Plásticos y Etéreos 2011 Vol.1
"Nuevas Sensaciones" (Note: Los Planetas cover.)	2014		De Viaje por los Planetas
"El Fondo del Barro"	2016		Banana Split
"El Amor de tu Vida"	2025	Gonzalo Yáñez	La Energía
