= Stereo 3 =

Chilean boy band

- Origin: Santiago, Chile
- Genres: Latin pop; teen pop
- Years active: 2000–2002; 2025–present
- Label: Sony Music Chile
- Members: Ignacio Rosselot (b. 1977)
- Past members: Gianfranco Foschino (b. 1983); Vittorio Montiglio (b. 1983)
- Website: Official Instagram

Stereo 3 is a Chilean boy band originally consisting of Ignacio Rosselot, Gianfranco Foschino and Vittorio Montiglio. Active in the early 2000s, the trio became known for their pop sound inspired by international groups popular at that time, such as NSYNC and the Backstreet Boys.

== Biography ==
The concept for Stereo 3 was developed by producers Cristián Heyne and Koko Stambuk—known collectively as Packman—starting around the year 2000. Having previously achieved success with the girl group Supernova, the duo sought to create a male pop trio with a more Latin-influenced sound aimed at potential international appeal. In contrast to Supernova's focus on adolescent romantic themes, Packman envisioned Stereo 3 exploring more mature and even erotic sentiments, with Stambuk composing lyrics that included themes such as relationships between younger men and older women.

Following a large-scale casting process, Heyne and Stambuk initially selected Ignacio Rosselot, a former member of the television dance troupe Generación 2000, which appeared on the Canal 13 show Venga Conmigo, followed by Vittorio Montiglio and Gianfranco Foschino, then 17-year-old students at the Scuola Italiana in Chile.

Their first album Partir de Cero was recorded throughout 2000 and released in March 2001 through Sony Music Chile. Their debut single, "Atrévete a Aceptarlo", became a major success, helping the band reach the number one spot on MTV Latin America's rankings for over five months. It was followed by similar success with "Amanecer sin ti", their first and only ballad single. The band experienced intense popularity during 2001, marked by large crowds of teenage fans at live performances. Stereo 3 performed successfully in Peru and Bolivia in addition to their activities in Chile. Stereo 3 gave their final performances in March 2002 and disbanded shortly thereafter. This same year, they were nominated at the 2002 MTV Video Music Awards in the category of International Viewer's Choice, Latin America - Pacific.

Following their disbandment, Rosselot relocated to Barcelona, Spain, where he continued pursuing a career in music. Since 2009, Rosselot led the band Insurrexion, performing the tribute show Play the Game which honoured the British band Queen. Foschino studied Audiovisual Communication at UNIACC University specializing in photography. He has then established himself as a respected visual artist, with his photographic and artistic work has been exhibited in various circuits both locally and internationally. Montiglio also moved into Audiovisual Communication, and primarily worked in advertising work, while also creating jingles and musical pieces. In 2004, he performed the main theme song of Hippie, and in 2005 the main theme song of Gatas y tuercas, both Chilean TV soap operas which aired on Canal 13. In 2017, he also appeared as a contestant on MasterChef Chile.

In late 2025, Ignacio Rosselot announced the return of Stereo 3 as a band under his leadership, in a series of concerts to commemorate 25 years since their debut. Rosselot commented that, approaching 50 years old, he wanted a "more honest, more mature" presentation for the band, changing their format to a full live band, and a departure from the choreographed style of the original era. Plans also include an unreleased EP scheduled for 2026, to be produced by Christian Leal—the first new material in over two decades.

== Discography ==
=== Albums ===
- Partir de Cero (2001)
