= Cristian Heyne =

Cristán Heyne
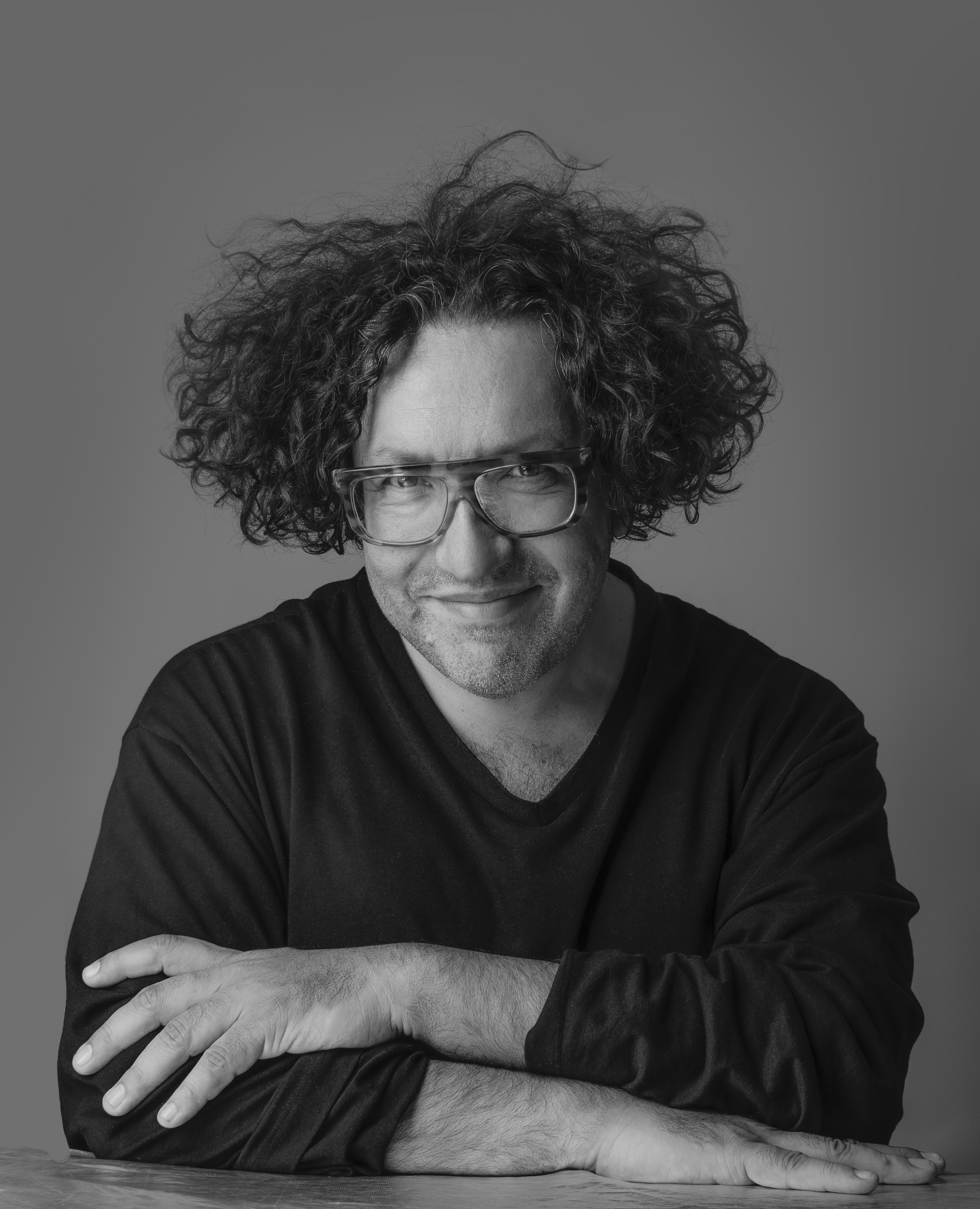
- Heyne in 2024
- Born: January 13, 1973 (age 53); Santiago, Chile
- Occupations: Musician; songwriter; record producer
- Years active: 1989–present
- Children: 1
- Musical career
- Instruments: Vocals; guitar; synthesizer
- Labels: EMI Odeón Chilena; Luna; Música del Sur; Demony

Cristián Heyne (born January 13, 1973, in Santiago) is a Chilean composer and producer, and formally a journalist.

== Biography ==
Heyne immersed himself in music as a self-taught practitioner, forming his first band at the age of 16 while still in high school at Liceo Manuel de Salas. He studied Journalism and Social Communication at university, where he was particularly influenced by the area of communication theory, which he describes as having a philosophical and poetic dimension that shaped his approach to music production.

Heyne began his musical career as the leader of the alternative rock trio Christianes, which emerged in the late 1980s and early 1990s. The band released their debut album Ultrasol in 1995, upon signing with EMI in Chile. Before Christianes disbanded in 1997, Heyne had already begun developing Shogún as an experimental outlet. Although initially presented as a band, in reality Shogún served as Heyne's solo project, for which he serves as the sole composer, producer, and creator.

His early production credits included diverse underground acts from Santiago such as Justine (starting with the 1997 single "En el jardín"), Luna In Caelo, Venus, Glup!, and a collaboration with Beto Cuevas. A major turning point came in 1999, with his partnership with Koko Stambuk of Glup!, under the name Packman. Their production work on the teenage pop trio Supernova achieved radio hits, platinum sales, and widespread commercial success. The duo later produced a male counterpart project, Stereo 3.

He is widely regarded as one of the key architects of Chilean pop in the 2000s, having produced influential albums for artists such as Gepe, Dënver, Álex Anwandter, Javiera Mena, and various other associated with the wave of "nuevo pop chileno" from this era.

He has also composed scores for the films Los debutantes and Se arrienda (with partial involvement in Machuca).

=== Collaborations and other projects ===
He co-founded the Kanguro Studio with musician Daniel Guerrero, and collaborated with him producing various projects, including albums for Luis Jara, Pali, and the TV animated series Villa Dulce. In 2017, he worked with artist Begoña Ortúzar on an EP released under the name Tormenta.

He co-directed the independent label Luna, co-founded the label Unión del Sur with Javiera Mena, and later established his own label, Demony, to further support and export Chilean independent music.

== Personal life ==
Heyne has a daughter with Chilean photographer Natalia Belmar. He has declared a strong aversion to live performances—neither performing nor attending concerts—considering them an obligation he does not wish to assume, as he does not see himself as a performer and finds little value in the rituals of touring, exposure, or public exposure.

== Production discography ==
=== Albums ===
List of albums entirely produced or co-produced by Cristian Heyne (Note: Excluding works from his own musical projects Shogún and Tormenta.)
| Album | Year | Artist | Label |
|---|---|---|---|
| Dolor de Fin de Siglo | 1998 | Venus | Toxic Records |
| 1999 | 1999 | Glup! | RCA/BMG Chile |
| Supernova | 1999 | Supernova | RCA/BMG Chile |
| A Color | 2000 | Javiera y Los Imposibles | Sony Music Chile |
| Wellcome Polinesia | 2000 | Glup! | RCA/BMG Chile |
| Partir de Cero | 2001 | Stereo 3 | Sony Music Chile |
| Retráctate | 2002 | Supernova | Sony Music Chile |
| Historias de la Calle | 2002 | Gufi | |
| Mi Destino | 2003 | Luis Jara | Universal Music Chile |
| Abismo | 2003 | Malcorazón | La Oreja |
| Villa Dulce | 2004 | | La Oreja |
| Electrocardiograma | 2004 | Pali | BMG Chile |
| Me Matas Corazón | 2005 | Daniel Guerrero | Feria Music |
| Esquemas Juveniles | 2006 | Javiera Mena | Quemasucabeza |
| Solo | 2007 | Sergio Lagos | Condormusic |
| El Blog de la Feña | 2008 | Denise Rosenthal | Feria Music |
| Combo Show | 2009 | Chancho en Piedra | Sony Music Chile |
| Corazón Rebelde | 2009 | CRZ | Sony Music Chile |
| El Blog de la Feña 2 | 2009 | Denise Rosenthal | Feria Music |
| El Quinto Día | 2009 | G6 | EMI Mexico |
| Audiovisión | 2010 | Gepe | Quemasucabeza |
| Mena | 2010 | Javiera Mena | Unión del Sur |
| Música, Gramática, Gimnasia | 2010 | Dënver | Cazador |
| Rebeldes | 2011 | Alex Anwandter | Feria Music |
| Nunca o una Eternidad | 2011 | Deborah de Corral | Warner Music Argentina |
| San Sebastián | 2011 | Fernando Milagros | Quemasucabeza |
| Panal | 2012 | Camila Moreno | Plaza Independencia Música |
| GP | 2012 | Gepe | Quemasucabeza |
| Panal | 2013 | Nicole | Chika Entertainment |
| Detrás del Vidrio | 2013 | Colombina Parra | |
| Nuevo Sol | 2014 | Fernando Milagros | Adelante Estudios |
| Otra Era | 2014 | Javiera Mena | Unión del Sur |
| Mala Madre | 2015 | Camila Moreno | Plaza Independencia Música |
| O Marineros | 2015 | Marineros | Barquito |
| Colores Paganos | 2016 | Tourista | Anti-Rudo Records |
| Estilo Libre | 2016 | Gepe | Quemasucabeza |
| Ciencia Exacta | 2017 | Gepe | Quemasucabeza |
| Folclor Imaginario | 2018 | Gepe | Quemasucabeza |
| Biggs | 2018 | José Biggs | |
| Indiependencia | 2018 | Indiependencia | |
| Derecho a Progresar | 2018 | André Ubilla | Colectivo Austral |
| Serpiente | 2019 | Fernando Milagros | Jungla Music |
| Aló! | 2020 | Pedropiedra | Quemasucabeza |
| Hara Kiri | 2020 | Nocheósfera | |
| Rey | 2021 | Camila Moreno | ACG Música |
| Manual de una Pérdida | 2021 | Fármacos | MYE |
| Belencha | 2021 | Belencha | Microdosis |
| Chao | 2022 | Yorka | |
| Cristal | 2022 | Shirel | Virgin Music Chile |
| Al calor de un sol que acaba de morir | 2023 | Marineros | Barquito |
| Cuarto | 2024 | Fármacos | Virgin Music Chile |
| Tótem | 2025 | Pedropiedra | Aló |
| Besar y Morder | 2025 | Ignacio Gumucio | Lluvia |

=== Songs ===
List of songs produced or co-produced by Cristian Heyne
| Title | Year | Artist | Album | Label |
|---|---|---|---|---|
| "Agüita" | 2013 | Danna Paola | Danna Paola | Universal Music Mexico |
| "Belleza" | 2016 | Fármacos | Estado De Gracia | Beast Discos |
| "Marcha de las Cadenas" | 2017 | Fernando Milagros | Milagros | Plaza Independencia Música |
| "Angel" | 2021 | Kings of Convenience | Peace or Love | EMI Records |

== Works ==
=== Soundtracks ===
- Los debutantes
- Se arrienda
- Machuca (in some musical pieces)

=== TV series ===
- Villa dulce (Canal 13)

== Artists he has worked with ==
- Álex Anwandter
- Camila Moreno
- Chinoy
- Danna Paola
- Dënver
- Gepe
- Glup!
- Javiera Mena
- Javiera y los Imposibles
- Luis Jara
- Luna in Caelo
- Malcorazón
- Pánico
- Pedropiedra
- Supernova
- Stereo 3
