= Se arrienda =

2005 film

For Rent
- Film poster
- Directed by: Alberto Fuguet
- Written by: Alberto Fuguet; Francisco Ortega
- Cinematography: Jorge Gonzáles
- Edited by: María Teresa Viera-Gallo
- Music by: Cristián Heyne; Andrés Valdivia
- Release date: 6 October 2005
- Running time: 109 minutes
- Country: Chile
- Language: Spanish

Se Arrienda (English: For Rent) is a 2005 Chilean drama film directed by Alberto Fuguet and starring Luciano Cruz-Coke. The film follows the fictional life of Gastón Fernández, a composer in his thirties who has achieved little career success since composing the score to a B movie during his time as a student.

== Plot ==
At the end of the 1980s, the young musician Gastón Fernández (Luciano Cruz-Coke) had a brilliant future ahead of him, along with his group of dreamer and idealist friends. Fifteen years later, fate has separated them. Gastón returns to Chile and faces a different country and the frustration of artistic success that never came. While his friends enjoy prosperity, memories torment him. Forced by circumstances, Gastón must compromise by working in his father's real estate agency, thus beginning a journey where he will meet Elisa (Francisca Lewin) and understand life without the weight of the past.

== Cast ==
- Luciano Cruz-Coke
- Felipe Braun
- Francisca Lewin
- Jaime Vadell
- Ignacia Allamand
- Diego Casanueva
- Cristóbal Gumucio
- Nicolás Saavedra
- Benjamín Vicuña
- Ariel Levy
- María Cristina Peña y Lillo

== See also ==
- Cinema of Chile
