= Quemasucabeza =

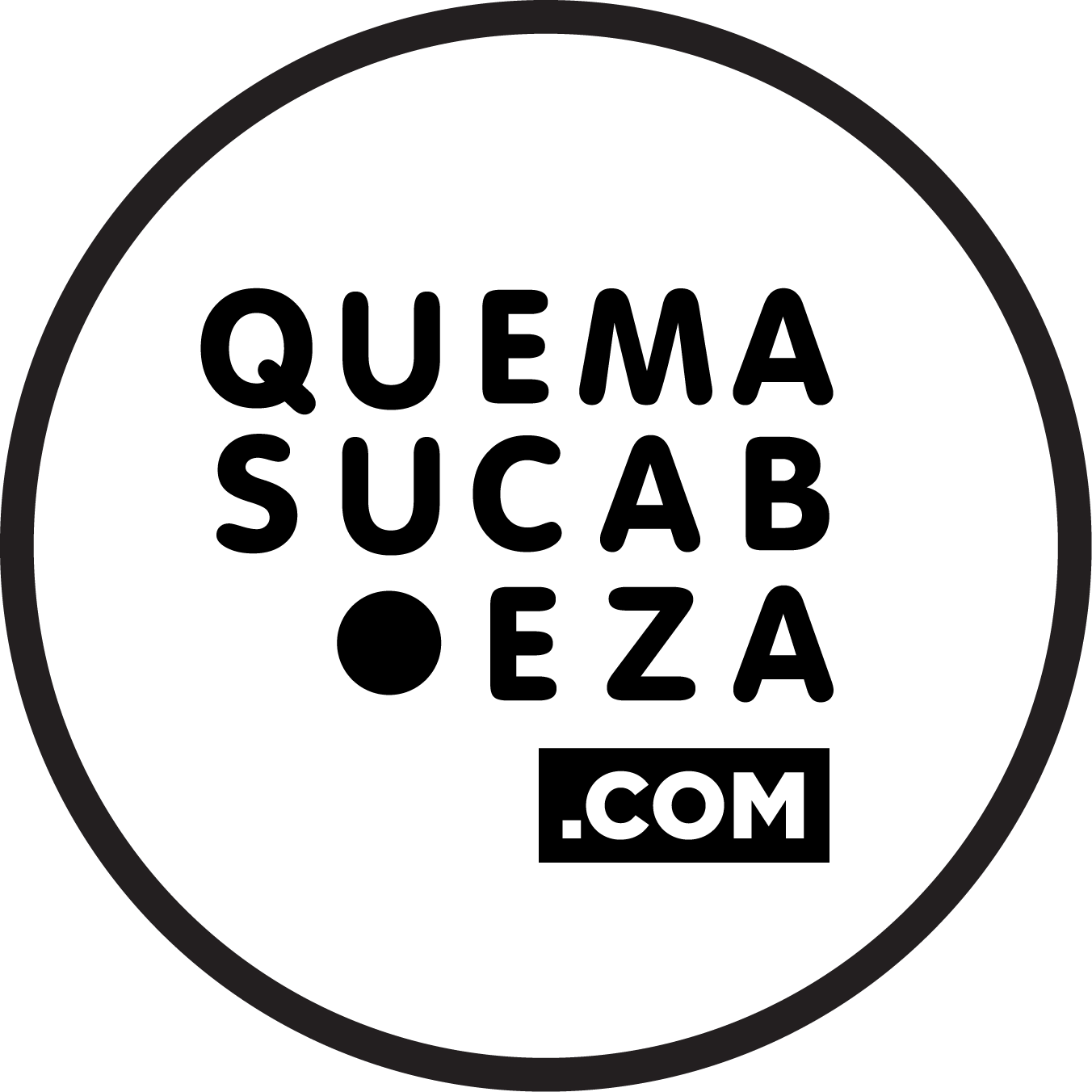
- Founded: 1998
- Founder: Walter Roblero; Rodrigo Santis; Jorge Santis
- Distributors: Astro Discos (Spain); Índice Virgen (Argentina); Terrícolas Imbeciles (Mexico)
- Genre: Indie rock; indie pop; Latin pop; indie folk
- Country of origin: Chile
- Location: Santiago
- Official website: quemasucabeza.com

Quemasucabeza (Latin American Spanish: [ˈkemasukaˈβesa]) is an independent record label from Santiago, Chile. Founded in 1998 as the self-release platform for the band Congelador, it evolved into one of the most renowned independent labels in Chile, known for its catalog of music by Chilean songwriters. The label is closely associated with the breakthrough of Chilean independent artists into wider recognition, particularly through figures like Gepe and Javiera Mena.

== History ==
The label's origins trace back to the friendship between Walter Roblero and Rodrigo Santis, who met at the Instituto Nacional in Santiago, and would later form the band Congelador around 1996 as a trio with Rodrigo's brother, Jorge Santis. Looking for options to release their music, the group received proposals from certain labels to help produce their debut album, but they preferred full creative freedom and control, rejecting the limited offers. In 1998, Congelador self-released their first record under Quemasucabeza, with the label name initially conceived as a one-time only name for that release, but was subsequently maintained for subsequent material. Jorge Santis served as early investor for the release of music through Quemasucabeza, with early operations relying mainly on income from Congelador's live shows. Journalist Carla Arias would later join Quemasucabeza as collaborator, helping with press and communication. Early non-Congelador releases by the label included the debut album by punk band Diacatorce, Volumen II by Griz, and the first record by Paranormal, parallel project of Rodrigo Santis.

Around 2002–2004 the structure changed following the departure of Walter Roblero, who pursued other ventures including human rights work. Rodrigo Madrid, civil engineer and business consultant, joined the label structure around 2003 after investing in Mostro's album HR=01, helping with its financing and regularization of its legal status. He described the label as a "community" or "clan," where trust mattered more than infrastructure. Artists stayed because of shared language and friendship rather than better offers from larger companies. The three of them would then reorganize the label under a more a business-oriented approach, aiming to make more sustainable.

A key revival moment for the label came in 2005 with the release of Panorama Neutral, a compilation that brought together established and emerging names in Chilean music, including Gepe, Javiera Mena, Barco (alias of Rodrigo Santis), and Diego Morales; duos Mostro and Dormitorio (by Congelador bassist Walter Roblero); and bands Familea Miranda, Dizzlecciko, Nhur (formerly Gnosis), Fredi Michel, Shogún, in addition to Congelador. The album was first presented on the first edition of the festival organized by the label, Festival Neutral. The signing of Gepe to the label this same year was described as a turning point, with releases that gained wider attention in Chile and helped professionalize the label's operations. Panorama Neutral was later released throughout Europe by Spanish label Astro Discos, and in Argentina by Índice Virgen.

In 2006, they released Esquemas Juveniles by Javiera Mena, which was critically acclaimed and served as a starting point for her international expansion.

In 2007, Quemasucabeza embarked on the Neutral 2007 Tour, its first major international outing with a full contingent, where various of its artists performed in Mexico and Argentina. This year they also founded the agency Armónica to produce and organize concerts, which served as an extra source of income for both the label and its artists.

By 2009, the label was already being recognized as one of Chile's most renowned independent labels, consistently by embracing the Internet as a tool rather than an enemy, in contrast to major labels in Chile which at that time were struggling due to illegal downloads. Through this business approach, only about 30% of revenue came from record sales (typically limited to five hundred records per artist). The rest derived from producing concerts for their artists, acting as their own managers, advising other groups, and bringing foreign musicians to Chile for shows. This made the label function partly as a production company rather than a traditional disquera focused solely on selling records.

In 2015, Quemasucabeza established a satellite office in Mexico, following a desire to strengthen ties between the Chilean and Mexican markets due to their cultural affinity. This year they also expanded the international reach of Festival Neutral, with their first edition in Mexico City. Performing acts included Protistas, Ases Falsos, Pedropiedra, Coiffeur, and Fakuta.

In 2018, the label celebrated its twentieth anniversary with a special edition of their Festival Neutral in Mexico, which featured several key artists for the label, including Familea Miranda, Mostro, Congelador, Fredi Michel, Ana Tijoux, Pedropiedra, and Gepe.

== Artists ==
=== Current ===
- Congelador
- Simón Campusano
- Caravana
- Emisario Greda
- Hesse Kassel
- Pedropiedra
- Protistas
- Las Mairinas
- Felicia Morales
- Mostro
- Niños del Cerro
- Vaya Futuro
- Bronko Yotte

=== Former ===
- Álex & Daniel (Álex Anwandter and Gepe)
- Ases Falsos
- Chinoy
- Coiffeur
- Diosque
- Gepe
- Gianluca
- Fármacos
- Fakuta
- Prehistöricos
- Princesa Alba
- Maifersoni
- Javiera Mena
- Fernando Milagros
- Diego Morales
- Ana Tijoux
