= Chinoy (musician) =

Chilean singer-songwriter

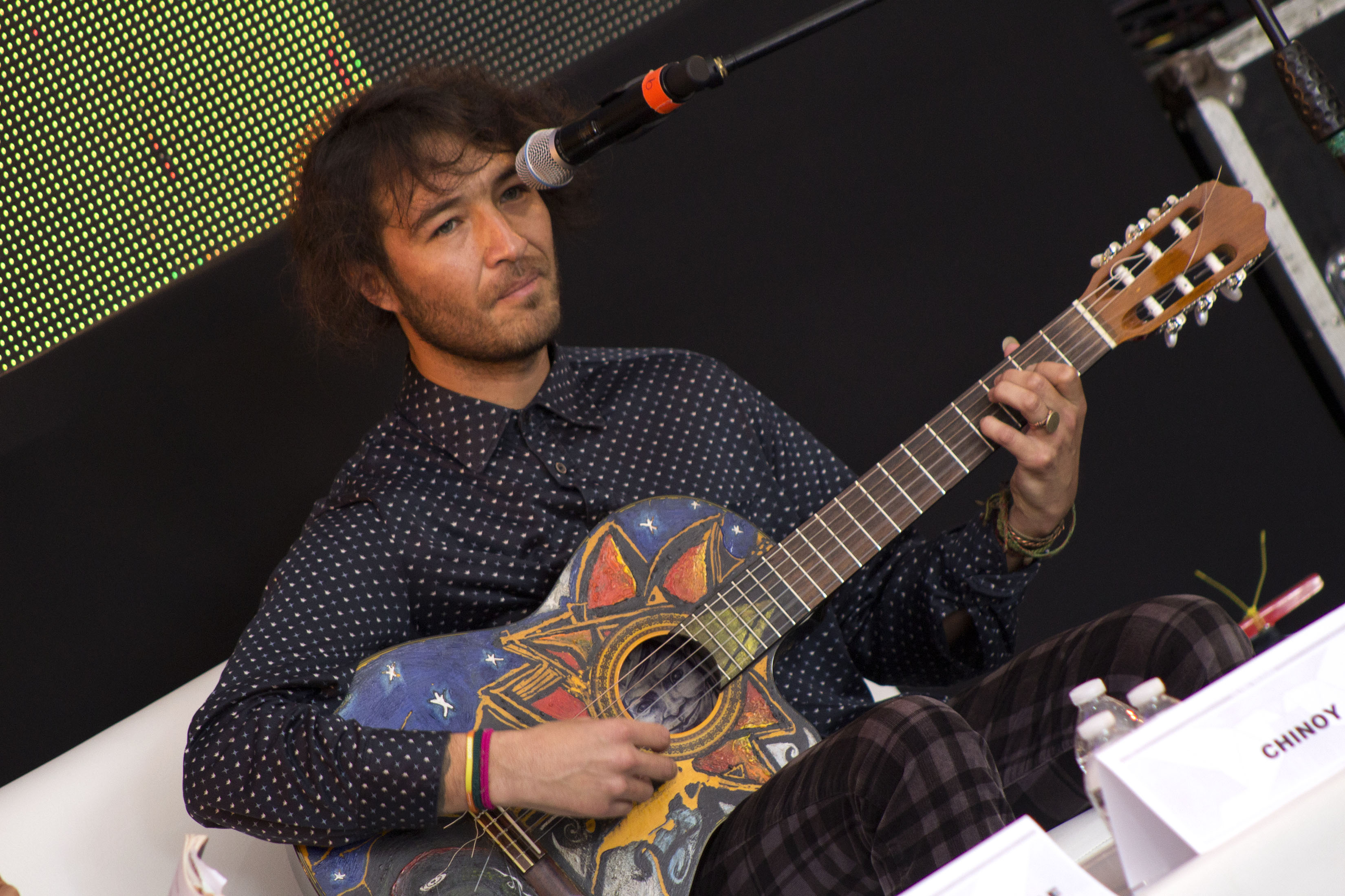

Background information
- Born: Mauricio Castillo Moya; 1982 (age 43–44)
- Origin: San Antonio, Chile
- Genres: Folk, trova, indie folk
- Years active: 2002 – present
- Labels: Oveja Negra; Quemasucabeza; Música Del Sur; Sudamerican Records; Fonarte Latino; Calaverita Records
- Website: www.myspace.com/chinoysite

Mauricio Castillo Moya (born 1982), known as Chinoy, is a Chilean singer-songwriter who has released two solo albums. Chinoy's androgynous voice, lyrics, poetics and iconic guitar technique have been compared to those of Bob Dylan by the Chilean media and his style has been described as trova, indie folk and folk punk.

== Early life ==
Chinoy was born in San Antonio, a commune of Valparaíso, Chile, where he founded the punk band Don Nadie and opened for the Argentine punk band Loquero in 2005. Loquero then invited him to spend a season in La Plata, Argentina. In 2007, he moved to Valparaiso where he studied for a short time and performed in local bars. It was there that Manuel García saw him perform and invited Chinoy to open for him in Valparaiso and Santiago. During 2007, Chinoy performed at Concepción, Puerto Montt, Punta Arenas, Valparaíso and Santiago and his song Carne de gallina appeared on the compilation album Escuelas de Rock 1er disco bicentenario (2007).

== Musical career ==
In 2008, Chinoy came to the attention of award-winning filmmaker Andrés Wood, who asked him to write the theme song for his movie La Buena Vida.

In 2009, he released his debut full-length album, Que salgan los dragones, on the record label Quemasucabeza. In October 2010, he began a national tour of Chile taking in Santiago, Talca, Chillán and Concepción. In January 2012, he performed at the opening ceremony of Chile's Viña del Mar International Book Festival and by January 2013, his MySpace page had more than 800,000 views.

== Discography ==
- 2009 - Que salgan los dragones
- 2010 - Chinoy en Bogotá

=== Soundtracks ===
- 2008 - La Buena Vida
