= Marian Ruzzi =

Mexican singer, composer and musician

Marian Ruiz Martínez (born Chihuahua, Mexico), better known as Ruzzi, is a Mexican singer, composer, producer, and musician. Ruzzi was nominated for the Best New Artist Award at the 2025 Latin Grammy Awards.

== Musical career ==
Ruzzi studied music at the Berklee College of Music.

Starting when she was 21, Ruzzi toured as a member of Julieta Venegas's band for five years.

Ruzzi's 2025 song "Al Chile" marks her entry into the Mexican regional genre, with a reinterpretation of a corrido.

== Discography ==
=== Albums ===
- Nave Especial (2018) with collaborations from Vanessa Zamora, Gepe, Meme del Real, and Natalia Lafourcade.
- Mariana (2024)
