= Synapse Audio Software =

German audio software company

- Initial release: 1998; 27 years ago
- Operating system: Windows, Mac OS X
- Website: http://www.synapse-audio.com

Synapse Audio Software is a software company located in Germany. Previously known as Sonic Syndicate and headed by Richard Hoffmann, they develop music production software for the Mac OS and Microsoft Windows platforms. They started developing software in November 1998 as Sonic Syndicate and changed their name to Synapse Audio with the release of Orion Platinum in 2002.

Sonic Syndicate ran a competition for users to suggest new names for the company. The winner received a free copy of Orion Platinum.

== Orion Studio ==
Orion is a main product manufactured by Synapse. It is a standalone music production package with a multitrack sequencer and pattern-based workflow. Orion includes several built-in instruments and supports additional Virtual Studio Technology (VST) instruments and effects plug-ins. As of version 8.5, Synapse Orion Studio contains following default instruments (generators):

- DrumRack - A 12-track sample-based drum machine, containing its own step and velocity sequencer.
- Sampler - Multisample player with two LFOs and three envelopes.
- Pro-9 - Virtual-analog drum machine.
- XR-909 - Analog drum synthesizer.
- Tomcat - Monophonic drum sound synthesizer.
- Wasp (XT and Mk-V) - Virtual Analog synthesizer.
- Toxic (2 and 3) - A 6 oscillator FM synth.
- Monobass - Monophonic bass synth (Acid Basslines)
- Screamer - A 2-oscillator synth with a distortion unit.
- Plucked String - Physical modelling string synth.
- Acoustic Grand Piano - Piano based on high-quality stereo samples of a real acoustic piano.
- WaveFusion (formerly WaveDream)- A 3-oscillator wavetable synthesizer.
- Ultran - A Wave-morphing sampler.
- MidiOut module
  Enables sending notes to external MIDI-compatible music equipment

== Other products ==
- The Legend - A recreation of Minimoog Model D synthesizer (VST Plugin / AU / Rack Extension Plugin)
- Obsession - A uniquely detailed software emulation of components of famous Oberheim classic synthesizer hardware, resulting in (VST / AU Plugins) that rival the original
- DUNE3 - A virtual-analog and wavetable synthesizer with a "Differential Unison Engine" (VST Plugin / AU)
- DUNE2 - A blend of virtual-analog and wavetable synthesizers with a "Differential Unison Engine" (VST Plugin / AU)
- DUNE - A virtual-analog synthesizer with a "Differential Unison Engine" (VST Plugin / AU)
- Antidote - Subtractive synthesizer with two complex oscillator banks and an eight mode filter (Rack Extension Plugin)
- EKS Pro - An electronic kick-drum synthesizer (VST Plugin / AU)
- X-Poly (formerly Poly-850) - Emulation of early analog synthesizers (VST Plugin / DXi)
- Hydra - Multimodel FM-like synthesizer (VST Plugin / DXi / AU)
- Junglist - Multimodel KickMaking synthesizer (VST Plugin / DXi)
- Scorpion - Emulation of a vintage analog synthesizer (VST Plugin / DXi)
- Plucked String - Simple Guitar simulation instrument (VST Plugin / DXi)
