= Fakuta =

- Born: Pamela Sepúlveda Ariza; February 2, 1982 (age 44); Santiago, Chile
- Occupations: Singer-songwriter; musician; architect
- Years active: 2004–present
- Musical career
- Genres: Indie pop; Latin pop
- Labels: Michita Rex; Quemasucabeza
- Website: www.fakuta.cl

Pamela Sepúlveda Ariza, publicly known as Fakuta, is a Chilean singer-songwriter, musician, and architect by training.

== Biography ==
Raised in a Mormon family, Sepúlveda Ariza attended church as a child but was eventually removed for playing secular music on the keyboard. She cited Fiona Apple as one of her early influences. Her musical involvement began in school workshops, playing covers of 1990s radio hits with a recorder. She later participated in the folk-grunge band Mary Celeste, where she shared rehearsal spaces with Martín Pescador.

In 2004 she became part of the band Golden Baba, and later in El Banco Mundial, an electroacoustic improvisation duo formed with Ignacio Morales. Around 2008, encouraged by friends like Dadalú—who noted that many of their peers had bedroom electronic solo projects—Sepúlveda began experimenting with electronic music on her computer. Initially intending vocal experiments, she ended up creating full songs. She self-taught production by studying early electronic, contemporary, and academic music, focusing on sampling and sound processing. She describes her approach as "autistic," autodidactic, and proletarian, formed peripherally rather than through formal pursuit of pop. This shift occurred in her final year of university while completing her architecture degree. She uploaded songs to Myspace, receiving positive feedback from peers including Javiera Mena and Milton Mahan (of indie pop duo Dënver). Encouraged to take music seriously, she began live performances featuring a trio of backing vocalists called The Laura Palmers along Anita Gallardo, Danae Morales, and Felicia Morales, inspired by Motown acts such as The Supremes.

She was also involved in the early discussions that led to the creation of the independent label Michita Rex, under we which she debuted as a solo artist in 2011. Her debut single was entitled "Armar y Desarmar" was produced by De Janeiros, the duo formed by Milton Mahan and Pablo Muñoz. Her first album, Al Vuelo, also produced by De Janeiros, was released in August of the same year, under her label Michita Rex. In 2013, Fakuta collaborated with Mon Laferte on her album Tornasol.

In 2014, Fakuta released her second album, Tormenta Solar, released via the independent label Quemasucabeza. The album shifted her style to a more definite pop territory, and also marked a life decision: quitting architecture to dedicate herself to music full-time. The album was met positive reviews by music critic outlets both domestically and internationally. In the years following Tormenta Solar, Sepúlveda continued developing her sound. She presented the album internationally, including being invited to perform for the first time at Primavera Sound 2015 in Spain. Upon quitting office work in 2013, Fakuta attempted to live as a musician as her full-time job—however, she eventually returned to more stable employment by the mid-2010s.

In 2017, she released the self-produced single "Abrazándote"; she described this new era of her music as a return to the freedom and spontaneity of her early days, focusing inward rather than outward, while learning more about self-production.

In 2022, Fakuta was featured on "Rasguño en la Piel," one of the tracks of Noviembre, the debut album by Chilean electronic music producer Andy.

== Discography ==
=== Albums ===
- Al Vuelo (2011)
- Tormenta Solar (2014)
