= Mena (album) =

Studio album by Javiera Mena
- Released: September 1, 2010 (Digital release); September 15, 2010 (Physical release)
- Recorded: 2008–2010
- Genre: Pop, electronic, synthpop, dance-pop
- Length: 35:04
- Label: Unión del Sur
- Producer: Cristián Heyne; Javiera Mena

Javiera Mena chronology
Esquemas Juveniles (2006)	Mena (2010)	Otra Era (2014)

Mena is the second studio album by Chilean recording artist Javiera Mena. It was officially released worldwide on September 1, 2010 via iTunes, and on September 15, 2010 physically through indie label Unión del Sur, as a follow-up to her successful debut, Esquemas Juveniles (2006). Javiera wrote and all the songs, as well as being the co-producer of every track in the album along with Cristián Heyne. Production first took place in early 2008 and recording sessions at Heyne's personal studio. A couple of months before the album's release, its first single "Hasta la Verdad" was sent to radio stations.

The music of Mena is rooted in the synthpop, electropop and dance-pop-oriented styles, a lot more than in her previous album. Mena also draws inspiration from the pop and electronic music of the 1990s.

At the end of 2010, iTunes Mexico named Mena "the breakthrough album that year".

== Track listing ==
All tracks are written by Javiera Mena.

No.	Title	Length
1.	"Ahondar en Tí"	3:21
2.	"Hasta la Verdad"	4:53
3.	"Primera Estrella"	4:09
4.	"El Amanecer"	3:42
5.	"No Te Cuesta Nada"	4:03
6.	"Luz de Piedra de Luna"	4:32
7.	"Sufrir" (feat. Jens Lekman)	3:46
8.	"Acá Entera"	3:30
9.	"Un Audífono Tú, Un Audífono Yo"	3:13
Total length:		35:04

== Critical reception ==
The album was highly acclaimed in the Latin music critic community, earning the first (and, to date, only) perfect 100 rating at Club Fonograma, (however, Juana Molina's Un día had already achieved a five-star rating in 2008) and was later named the site's #1 album of 2010. The track "Luz de Piedra de Luna" was also named the site's single of the year for 2010. Mena also received a 4/5 rating from dance music website Resident Advisor, describing the album as an "aural cocktail volatile by nature, but stable and powerful in its finished form," and called the record's sound as "dance-pop for lovers".

== Personnel ==
- Javiera Mena – Production, composition and arrangements, programming, synthesizers, guitar
- Cristián Heyne – Recording, mixing, programming, guitar, synthesizers
- Jim Brick – Mastering
- Pablo Bello – Strings recording
- Kelley Polar – Strings arrangement, strings recording
- Lara Pedrosa – Bass, backing vocals
- José Miguel Tobar – Strings arrangement
- Diego Morales – Programming
- Andrés Silva – Hihat, percussion
- Lido Pimienta – additional vocals
- Daniel Hunt – Synthesizers, sound treatment
- Jens Lekman – vocals
- Rod – Cover/artwork photography
- Alejandro Ros – Design
