= Club Fonograma =

American music blog

- Website type: Music webzine
- Owner: Carlos Reyes
- Registration: No
- Launched: 2008
- Current status: Active

Club Fonograma was a United States-based daily Internet publication established in 2008 that was devoted to music criticism and commentary, music news, mixtapes, podcasts, and artist interviews. Its focus is on global pop and independent music from artists of Spanish, Caribbean, and Latin American origin or background. It was notable for its eclectic and idiosyncratic English-language coverage of mostly Spanish-language music. It was praised as the "Pitchfork of Latin Music" and as "hands down the best go-to music site for indie music out of America and Spain."

Club Fonograma was created in Phoenix, Arizona in 2008 by Chicano cinephile Carlos Reyes, while attending college in Phoenix. During its run, the site has expanded from a simple music review site and now also covers events such as South by Southwest, the Latin American Music Conference, Vive Latino, and Festival NRMAL. Their coverage has also been praised by American music outlets such as Pitchfork and NPR. The site also won a 2012 IMAS award for "Best Music Website".

From 2008 through 2011, the site curated a mixtape series called Fonogramaticos. These albums contained a mix of unreleased songs from both prominent major-label acts and unsigned or independent artists, and are free for readers to download. A total of fourteen volumes were created in the series. Since then, the site has released annual compilations outside the Fonogramaticos series.

In 2011, the site began its own podcast called the Fonocast, hosted by writer Blanca Mendez. Each month, the Fonocast is centered on a different theme, and has a revolving set of co-hosts, usually other Club Fonograma staff writers.

On December 28, 2022, it was announced that the owner of the site, Carlos Reyes, had died. Helado Negro, Julieta Venegas, Quiero Club, and many others expressed both sadness at his death and gratitude for the power of his work.

== Club Fonograma Album and Song of the Year winners ==
=== Club Fonograma Album of the Year ===
Year	Artist	Album	Nation	Source
2007	Calle 13	Residente o Visitante	Puerto Rico	
2008	El Guincho	Alegranza!	Spain	
2009	Emilio José	Chorando Apréndese	Spain	
2010	Javiera Mena	Mena	Chile	
2011	Bam Bam	Futura Vía	Mexico	
2012	Ases Falsos	Juventud Americana	Chile	
2013	BFlecha	βeta	Spain	
2014	Diosque	Constante	Argentina	

=== Club Fonograma Song of the Year ===
Year	Artist	Song	Nation	Source
2008	El Guincho	Palmitos Park	Spain	
2009	Natalia Lafourcade	Azul	Mexico	
2010	Javiera Mena	Luz de Piedra de Luna	Chile	
2011	Los Claveles	Nacional 42	Spain	
2012	Mañaneros	Baby Tropical	Chile	
2013	Füete Billēte	La Trilla (Móntate Aquí)	Puerto Rico	
2014	Javiera Mena	Otra Era	Chile	
2015	Playa Gótica	Reptil No Gentil	Chile	

== Club Fonograma Top 10 Albums of the Decade (2000-2009) ==
Order	Artist	Album	Country
1	Café Tacuba	Cuatro Caminos	Mexico
2	Javiera Mena	Esquemas Juveniles	Chile
3	Porter	Atemahawke	Mexico
4	Julieta Venegas	Bueninvento	Mexico
5	Calle 13	Residente o Visitante	Puerto Rico
6	Emilio José	Chorando Apréndese	Spain
7	Natalia Lafourcade	Hu Hu Hu	Mexico
8	Triángulo de Amor Bizarro	Triángulo de Amor Bizarro	Spain
9	El Guincho	Alegranza!	Spain
10	En Ventura	Los Gandharvas	Mexico

== Club Fonograma Top 10 Songs of the Decade (2000-2009) ==
Order	Artist	Song	Country
1	Javiera Mena	Al Siguiente Nivel	Chile
2	Calle 13	Atrevete-te-te!	Puerto Rico
3	Triángulo de Amor Bizarro	El Fantasma de la Transición	Spain
4	Hello Seahorse!	Bestia	Mexico
5	Julieta Venegas	Lento	Mexico
6	Café Tacuba	Eres	Mexico
7	Celso Piña ft. Control Machete & Blanquito Man	Cumbia Sobre el Río	Mexico
8	Porter	Cuervos	Mexico
9	Rita Indiana y los Misterios	La Hora de Volvé	Dominican Republic
10	Natalia Lafourcade	Azul	Mexico
