= Huellas (Myriam Hernández album) =

Greatest hits album by Myriam Hernández
- Released: April 20, 2004
- Studio: Chartmaker Studios (Malibu, California); Estudio Cablesanto (Santiago, Chile); Estudios El Cerro (Salta, Argentina); Santuario Sonico (Santiago, Chile); Westlake Studios (United States)
- Genre: Latin pop; Latin ballad; R&B
- Label: Capitol Latin; EMI
- Producer: Myriam Hernandez; Walter Afanasieff; Humberto Gatica; Juan Carlos Calderón; Juan Carlos Duque

Myriam Hernández chronology
El amor en concierto (2001)	Huellas (2004)	Enamorándome (2007)

Huellas is a greatest hits album by Chilean singer Myriam Hernández. It was released on April 20, 2004, through Capitol Latin/EMI.

== Background ==
Huellas marked Hernandez' return to EMI, the label that launched her career, becoming her first album released with this label since 1992's Dos. The album, produced by Hernandez herself, includes thirteen of her greatest hits, along with four newly-recorded tracks. While promoting the album, Hernandez stated "It is very valuable for me to release this record, which is not easy because sometimes it is more challenging than creating an album with 10 new songs. Choosing the hits that have marked your discography, along with selecting songs that are at the same level or better than what is currently being showcased, is difficult [but] it is a very valuable album because the songs in it have left traces (huellas) on me and on people".

The lead track of the album is "He Vuelto Por Ti", with was composed by her son, Jorge Ignacio, when he was seven years old, with lyrics written by Hernandez. The second newly-recorded song is "No Te He Robado Nada", a song composed by renowned Mexican singer-songwriter Armando Manzanero, which was previously recorded in the 1990s by Venezuelan artist Toña Granado. This particular song also represents a departure from Hernandez’s usual themes, as it is the first time she performs a song in which the interlocutor is another woman. The third new song is a new version of "Mío" (originally included in her second album), which features Argentine group Los Nocheros. The fourth new song is "El Amor De Mi Vida" featuring Chilean group Los Tetas, which marks Hernandez' first incursion into hip-hop and funk elements.

In the United States, the album was released in two formats: CD only and CD+DVD. The DVD included all of Hernandez' music videos as of that date, plus bonus material. In certain regions, the DVD was also released as a stand-alone disc.

== Promotion ==
In June 2004, Hernández embarked on a media tour for Huellas, on which she promoted the album in various media outlets in the United States, Colombia, Mexico, Venezuela and Peru.

== Commercial performance ==
Huellas sold over 18,000 copies in Chile, with reported sales totaling 100,000 copies throughout Latin American territories.

== Critical reception ==
In 2005, the album received a nomination at the Altazor Awards for Best Record in the Ballad category.

== Track listing ==
Huellas track listing
No.	Title	Writer(s)	Producer	Length
1.	"He vuelto por ti"	Jorge Ignacio Saint-Jean; Myriam Hernández	Walter Afanasieff	3:59
2.	"No te ha robado nada"	Armando Manzanero	Afanasieff	3:47
3.	"Mío" (featuring Los Nocheros)	Gogo Muñoz	Afanasieff	3:41
4.	"Huele a peligro"	Manzanero	Humberto Gatica	4:54
5.	"La fuerza del amor"	Estéfano	Gatica	4:45
6.	"El amor de mi vida" (featuring Los Tetas and DJ Ju)	Hernández; Iannara Zuñiga; Camilo Castaldi; Cristián Moraga; Felo Foncea; DJ Ju	Afanasieff	4:35
7.	"Mañana"	Juan Andrés Ossandón; Tatiana Bustos	Ossandón	4:38
8.	"Ese hombre"	María Angélica Ramírez	Gatica	4:11
9.	"Se me fue"	Juan Carlos Calderón	Calderón	3:33
10.	"Un hombre secreto"	Calderón	Calderón	3:26
11.	"Herida"	Hernández	Gatica	3:58
12.	"Te pareces tanto a él"	Álvaro Torres	Gatica	3:45
13.	"Peligroso amor"	Muñoz	Gatica	4:05
14.	"Eres"	Muñoz	Juan Carlos Duque	3:52
15.	"El hombre que yo amo"	Muñoz	Duque	3:33
16.	"Ay amor"	John Elliott; Nano Prado	Duque	4:34
17.	"Lloraré"	Jaime Hernández; M. Hernández	Gatica	5:22
Total length:				1:10:53

Huellas DVD track listing
No.	Title	Length
1.	"He vuelto por ti"	3:59
2.	"No te ha robado nada"	3:45
3.	"Mío" (featuring Los Nocheros)	3:13
4.	"Huele a peligro"	4:49
5.	"Mañana"	4:33
6.	"Ese hombre"	4:13
7.	"Se me fue"	3:36
8.	"Un hombre secreto"	3:24
9.	"Herida"	3:41
10.	"Te pareces tanto a él"	3:43
11.	"Peligroso amor"	4:00
12.	"El hombre que yo amo"	3:31
13.	"Mío" (bonus track) (featuring Los Nocheros)	3:38
14.	"Biography" (bonus material)
15.	"En Off" (bonus material)
16.	"Photo Gallery" (bonus material)
17.	"Discography" (bonus material)
