= El amor en concierto =

Live album by Myriam Hernández
- Released: December 12, 2001
- Recorded: October 1-2, 2001
- Venue: Municipal Theatre of Santiago
- Genre: Latin pop, Latin ballad
- Label: Sony Music Chile
- Producer: Myriam Hernandez

Myriam Hernández chronology
+ y más... (2000)	El amor en concierto (2001)	Huellas (2004)

El amor en concierto is the first live album by Chilean singer Myriam Hernández. It was released on December 12, 2001, through Sony Music Chile.

== Background ==
El amor en concierto is Hernandez' first live album, recorded from a series of two concerts she held on October 1 and 2, 2001, at the Municipal Theatre of Santiago in Chile. The concert revisits many of her hit songs from previous albums up to + y más..., as well as a three-song tribute to Violeta Parra, and "Adagio", which in Spanish was known as "Mientras mi alma sienta" with lyrics written by Camilo Sesto (and originally performed by Ángela Carrasco).

Hernández herself is credited as producer of the album, and she was also involved in its mixing with Oscar López, and in its programming with Gabriel Vigliensoni (former Lucybell). The recording was in charge of Joaquín García and Pablo Toledo, musicians who had joined Hernández during live shows.

== Track listing ==
CD
No.	Title	Length
1.	"Obertura"	1:22
2.	"Herida"	3:50
3.	"Mío"	4:14
4.	"No puedo olvidarte"	4:33
5.	"Quiero saber"	3:43
6.	"Se me fue"	4:22
7.	"La fuerza del amor"	5:37
8.	"Un hombre secreto"	3:38
9.	"Leña y fuego"	3:58
10.	"Huele a peligro"	5:05
11.	"Peligroso amor"	4:17
12.	"Mañana"	4:37
13.	"Camino sin camino"	3:19
14.	"Adagio"	4:00
15.	"Ay amor"	4:39
16.	"Homenaje a Violeta Parra" (Casamiento de negros / Volver a los 17 / Gracias a la vida)	7:44
17.	"El hombre que yo amo"	4:42
