= Sinergia (Myriam Hernández album) =

Studio album by Myriam Hernández
- Released: May 27, 2022
- Recorded: 2020–2021
- Genre: Latin pop, Latin ballad
- Label: JenesisPro
- Producer: Jacobo Calderón

Myriam Hernández chronology
| Seducción (2011) | Sinergia (2022) | Nuestra Navidad (2022) |

Sinergia (Spanish: [siˈneɾxja], lit. 'Synergy') is the ninth studio album by Chilean singer Myriam Hernández. It was released independently on May 27, 2022.

== Background ==
Following the release of Seducción, Hernández did not release new music for several years, with the exception of her single "Mi pequeño amor", which was recorded for Canal 13's soap opera Valió la pena. During this period, she also had recurring appearances on Chilean television, most remarkably in her role as coach on the TV show Yo Soy. During 2019, she embarked on her Soy Mujer international tour, for which she wrote a new song with the same title. In 2020, she released two stand-alone singles on digital platforms: "Sentirás mi amor", a cover with Spanish lyrics of Bob Dylan's song "Make You Feel My Love" popularized by Adele, and "Amorfoda (Respuesta)", a new version of Bad Bunny's "Amorfoda" with reformulated lyrics. However, musically she could not find songs that entirely inspired her to record new material, stating "I cannot record something I do not like, that is why I waited".

The person who convinced Hernández to record a full new album was Jacobo Calderón, upon contacting her through social media. Jacobo Calderón is the son of Juan Carlos Calderón, responsible for producing Hernández' third album, and the person behind some of her signature hit songs. They ultimately met in person while Hernández was doing a concert in Spain. On encountering Calderón Jr., Hernández commented "Meeting Jacobo was a surprise, first because of the affection and friendship I had with his father, but then, after getting to know him, our chemistry was immediate. He gave me some song proposals that were decisive in making me fall in love again with the idea of recording a new album". Meeting Calderón Jr. was a sign to continue with the project Hernández had planned, as she stated "we started working, and I was uncertain if I would like the songs, but after first one I received I fell completely in love [with it]". The first song that Calderón shared with Hernández was "Bailemos en la oscuridad". Hernández and Calderón began working on the album in 2020, via internet; Calderón would send demos through WhatsApp or e-mail, then Hernández would record the songs on her private studio at her house. They finished recording the first 5 songs in January 2020, but production had to come to a halt due to the COVID-19 pandemic. In April 2021, they were able to finish recording the remaining songs of the album in Miami.

The album title was inspired by the artistic connection that occurred between Hernández, Calderón, and their team during the creative process. The album was described by the artist as a milestone in her career, as well as her "bravest and brightest" album to date. The album features eleven tracks focused on themes of love and female resilience. The COVID-19 pandemic also served as inspiration for the record, as Hernandez expressed the "need to create songs that would offer hope, with a more positive message, always inspired by love".

Sinergia became Hernandez' first full-length record in over a decade, as well as her first album published independently under her own label, JenesisPro. The album was also released exclusively on digital platforms, becoming her first record not to be released on physical formats.

== Promotion ==
Hernandez embarked on her Sinergia tour, which began in October 2021 in eleven cities in the United States. Subsequently, she performed shows in Argentina, Bolivia, Ecuador, Colombia, Costa Rica, Panama, Peru, and the Dominican Republic. In Chile, she held a concert at the Movistar Arena on June 11, 2022.

== Track listing ==
All tracks are written by Jacobo Calderón.

Digital release
| No. | Title | Length |
|---|---|---|
| 1. | "Hasta aquí" | 3:01 |
| 2. | "Mi paraíso" | 4:06 |
| 3. | "Encadenada a ti" | 3:37 |
| 4. | "Ya es tarde" | 4:03 |
| 5. | "Vuelvo a sentir" | 3:57 |
| 6. | "Bailemos en la oscuridad" | 3:52 |
| 7. | "Te quiero, ti amo" | 3:12 |
| 8. | "Sinergia" | 4.00 |
| 9. | "Fuimos" | 3:14 |
| 10. | "El último adiós" | 3:55 |
| 11. | "Partir de ti" | 3:45 |
