= Enamorándome =

Studio album by Myriam Hernández
- Released: August 28, 2007
- Recorded: 2006–2007
- Studio: Boris Milan Studios
- Genre: Latin pop, Latin ballad
- Label: La Calle Records; Sony-BMG Music Entertainment Chile
- Producer: Myriam Hernández, Jorge Luis Piloto, Manny López

Myriam Hernández chronology
Huellas (2004)	Enamorándome (2007)	Seducción (2011)

Enamorándome is the seventh studio album by Chilean singer Myriam Hernández. In the United States, it was released on August 28, 2007, through La Calle Records (label owned by Univision Music LLC).

In Chile, it was released on October 2, 2007, through Sony-BMG Music Entertainment.

== Background ==
Enamorándome is Hernandez' first studio album in seven years, and the first one released under her partnership with Univision Music Group in the United States and Mexico, and Sony-BMG in Chile.

The album consists of ten songs, of which five are original tracks and the remaining five are covers. Hernández recorded covers of songs well known in the Spanish-speaking industry, such as “Volver a amar” originally performed by Cristian Castro, “Dónde estará mi primavera” by Marco Antonio Solís, “Bésame” by Ricardo Montaner, “Amor mío” by Raphael, and “Vuela muy alto” by Jerry Rivera. A highlight on the album is the song "Huellas", which Colombian singer Soraya wrote specifically for Hernández, and which she wanted to include as a personal and professional tribute to the late artist. The remaining new songs were written by Miami-based musicians Jorge Luís Piloto and Manny López.

“No pensé enamorarme otra vez”, a duet with Puerto Rican singer Gilberto Santa Rosa, served as the lead single of the album. The song achieved moderate success, peaking at number 10 on the Billboard Latin Pop Airplay chart. “Dónde estará mi primavera” served as the album's second single. Both songs were accompanied by music videos directed by Juan Pablo Olivares “Donde hubo amor” served as the album's third single.

== Promotion ==
For promoting the album, Hernández undertook an extensive media campaign through the United States, Puerto Rico, Honduras, Panama, Costa Rica, and Chile. In November 2007, Hernandez performed “Dónde estará mi primavera” live at the Latin Grammy tribute concert dedicated to Marco Antonio Solis, which was held in Miami and broadcast by Univision.

The Enamorándome live tour began in Chile in January 2008. In April of that same year, the international leg of the tour started, in which Hernandez held concerts throughout America, including the Dominican Republic, Panama, Nicaragua, Honduras, Ecuador, Peru, Bolivia, and the United States. In 2009, she added two additional dates to the tour in Temuco and Talca. The tour totalled 96 shows with venues in 12 different countries.

== Chart performance ==
The album peaked at number 49 on the Billboard Top Latin Albums, and at number 10 on the Latin Pop Albums chart, becoming Hernandez' first Billboard entry in 9 years, since 1998's Todo el amor.

== Track listing ==
CD
No.	Title	Writer(s)	Length
1.	"Donde hubo amor"	Jorge Luis Piloto, Manuel Lopez	4:26
2.	"No pensé enamorarme otra vez" (duet with Gilberto Santa Rosa)	Piloto	4:44
3.	"Vuela muy alto"	Estéfano	4:34
4.	"Bandera blanca"	Piloto, Raul del Sol	4:03
5.	"Bésame"	Jorge Luis Chacín, Ricardo Montaner	4:19
6.	"Mírame"	Piloto, Lopez	3:46
7.	"Dónde estará mi primavera"	Marco Antonio Solís	4:25
8.	"Huellas"	Soraya Lamilla	4:31
9.	"Volver a amar"	Kike Santander	5:01
10.	"Amor mío"	Manuel Alejandro	4:17

== Charts ==
Chart (2007)	Peak position
US Latin Pop Albums (Billboard)	10
US Top Latin Albums (Billboard)	49
