= + y más... =

Studio album by Myriam Hernández
- Released: August 29, 2000
- Recorded: 1999–2000
- Studio: Circle House Studios; L.A. East Recording Studios; Living Stereo Studio; Midnight Blue Studios; Moon Red Music; North Bay Recording Studios; Simply Audio; South Point Studios; The Hit Factory Criteria; West Lake Audio
- Genre: Latin pop, Latin ballad
- Label: Sony Music Chile; Sony Discos
- Producer: Myriam Hernandez

Myriam Hernández chronology
Todo el Amor (1998)	+ y más... (2000)	El amor en concierto (2001)

+ y más... (Spanish: [ˈmas i ˈmas], lit. 'More and More') is the sixth studio album by Chilean singer Myriam Hernández. It was released on August 29, 2000, through Sony Music Chile and Sony Discos.

== Background ==
In 2000, Hernández along with her then manager and husband, Jorge Saint-Jean, decided to leave Chile with their two children and settle in Miami, with the purpose of consolidating her international career. In parallel with this process, production of her second album under her contract with Sony album began. Hernandez herself served as producer and enlisted several Miami-based musicians, including Lester Mendez, Estéfano, Kike Santander, Rudy Pérez, and Humberto Gatica, to work on the record.

On this album there was a shift in Hernández' music and style. While maintaining her love-themed lyrics, there was a clear interest on her part in exploring new styles and expand her reach, trying to incorporate modern-feel pop rhythms that were in trend in the late 1999s and early 2000s to her distinctive pop ballads. Hernandez wrote only one song for this album, "Cenicienta de tu amor". A cover of Richard Marx's song "One More Time" -which he originally provided to Laura Pausini and then self-covered- is also included, with Spanish lyrics penned by Estéfano.

"Mañana", a ballad written by Chilean composers Juan Andrés Ossandón and Tatiana Bustos, served as the lead single of the album. The song became a hit, achieving gold and platinum status in Chile. "Quién cuidará de mí", a more pop-oriented song written by Estéfano, was promoted as the album's second single. Both songs were accompanied by music videos. Subsequent singles that received radio airplay were "Cenicienta de tu amor", "Leña y fuego", and "Si yo me vuelvo a enamorar".

== Commercial performance ==
The album sold approximately 18,000 copies, which represented a significant drop compared to her previous record, Todo el Amor. The sales figures led to the termination of the recording contract between Sony Discos and Hernández.

== Track listing ==
+ y más... track listing
No.	Title	Writer(s)	Length
1.	"Quién cuidará de mí"	Estéfano	3:59
2.	"Cenicienta de tu amor"	Myriam Hernández	5:37
3.	"No llegarás"	Tatiana Bustos	4:44
4.	"Por ti"	Daniel Betancourt	4:52
5.	"Mañana"	Juan Andrés Ossandón, Bustos	4:42
6.	"Si te vas"	Ossandón, Bustos	3:49
7.	"Qué te ha dado ella"	Betancourt	4:23
8.	"Si yo me vuelvo a enamorar"	Rudy Pérez	3:59
9.	"Leña y fuego"	Gustavo Santander	3:53
10.	"Una vez más"	Richard Marx (Spanish lyrics: Estéfano)	4:12

== Personnel ==
Credits adapted from the liner notes of + y más....

- Myriam Hernandez – production, vocals, backing vocals (2, 6), vocal percussion (3)
- Estéfano – arrangements, backing vocals (1)
- Lester Mendez – keyboards (2, 3, 6), arrangements (2, 3, 6, 10), engineering (2, 3, 6), programming (2, 3, 6, 10), production (3)
- Marcello Azevedo – arrangements (1)
- Daniel Betancourt – arrangements (4, 7), programming (4), keyboards (7)
- Kike Santander – arrangements, programming (4, 7), backing vocals (4)
- Juan Andrés Ossandón – production, arrangements, programming, keyboards (5)
- Rudy Pérez – production, strings arrangements (8)
- Humberto Gatica – production, engineering, mixing (10)
- Odisa Beltran – coordinator (1)
- Andres Bermudez – engineering (1)
- Jason Wilkes – engineering (assistant) (1)
- Carlos Alvarez – vocal engineering (1)
- Joel Numa – engineering (1, 5), mixing (1)
- Carlos Paucar – engineering (2, 3, 6), vocals engineering (5), Pro Tools engineering (5)
- Chris Brooke – engineering (assistant) (10)
- Cristian Robles – engineering (assistant) (10)
- Marcelo Añez – engineering (4, 7, 9)
- Doc Wiley – Pro Tools engineering (5)
- Danny Saber – Pro Tools engineering (10)
- Kenny O'Brien – Pro Tools engineering (10)
- Carlos Nieto – vocals engineering, strings engineering (4, 7)
- Jorge Calandrelli – strings arrangement, conductor (4, 5)
- Cesar Sogbe – mixing (2, 3, 6)
- Javier Garza – mixing (4, 5, 7, 9)
- Doug Emery – arrangements, programming, keyboards (5)
- Joel Someillan – keyboards, arrangements, programming (9)
- Pablo Flores – arrangements (9)
- Gary Lindsay – strings arrangements (8)
- Alfredo Oliva – strings arrangements, conductor (10)
- David Campbell – strings arrangements (10)
- Jenny Cruz – backing vocals (1)
- Lena Pérez – backing vocals (1)
- Betty Wright – backing vocals (2, 6)
- Tommy Anthony – backing vocals (2, 6)
- Wendy Pedersen – backing vocals (2, 3, 6)
- Ramiro Teran – backing vocals (3)
- Catalina Rodríguez – backing vocals (4)
- Robin Espejo – backing vocals (4)
- Vicky Echeverry – backing vocals (4)
- Dan Warner – acoustic guitar (1, 5, 7), electric guitar (1, 4, 5, 7), steel guitar (4)
- Manny Lopez – acoustic guitar, electric guitar (2, 3, 6)
- René Toledo – acoustic guitar (9)
- Ramón Stagnaro – acoustic guitar (10)
- Michael Landau – electric guitar (10)
- Michael Thompson – electric guitar (10)
- Julio Hernandez – bass (1, 5)
- Lee Levin – drums (3, 5)
- Ed Bonilla – percussion (1)
- Miami Strings Orchestra – strings (4, 5, 7)
- Utah Symphony Orchestra – strings (8)
