= IV (Myriam Hernández album) =

Studio album by Myriam Hernández
- Released: December 13, 1994
- Recorded: 1994
- Studio: Brooklyn Studios; Sound Chamber Recorders; Milagro Sound Recorders
- Genre: Latin pop, Latin ballad
- Label: WEA Latina
- Producer: Humberto Gatica

Myriam Hernández chronology
| III (1992) | IV (1994) | Lo Mejor (1997) |

IV (Cuatro), or Myriam Hernández IV, is the fourth studio album by Chilean singer Myriam Hernández. It was released on December 13, 1994, through Warner Elektra Atlantic (WEA) Latina.

== Background ==
While pregnant with her first child, Hernández returned to Los Angeles to record her fourth studio album, and second under her contract with Warner. The album was produced by Humberto Gatica and, for the first time, Hernandez herself served as co-producer. Additionally, for the first time in Hernandez' career she collaborated with non-Latino composers on one of her albums, as renowned musicians in the pop ballad scene at the time were enlisted to work with her, most remarkably David Foster and Albert Hammond. Hernandez herself co-wrote four songs on the album.

For the filming of the album's first promotional single, "Ese hombre" (written by Chilean composer María Angélica Ramírez), Hernández was eight months pregnant, and the album was released in December, just a month after the birth of her first son. Months later, "Ese hombre" entered the Billboard ranking and peaked at number six on the Hot Latin Tracks and number one on the Latin Pop Airplay chart.

Released in the United States, Mexico, Colombia (on cassette, CD, and LP), as well as in Europe and Chile, it featured other singles like "No hace falta más que dos" (co-written by Hernández and Juan Carlos Duque), which peaked at #25 on the Hot Latin Tracks and number five on the Latin Pop Airplay chart, the pop track "Lo mejor que me ha pasado" by Scottie Scott, "Lloraré" co-written with her brother Jaime Hernández, and "Sentimental".

This became Hernandez' her last self-titled album, and also her last record released under Warner, and it is currently out of print and unavailable on streaming platforms.

== Commercial performance ==
Myriam Hernandez IV did not chart on the US Billboard charts, becoming Hernandez' first record that failed to do so. However, the album was certified double platinum in Chile.

== Track listing ==
CD
| No. | Title | Writer(s) | Length |
|---|---|---|---|
| 1. | "Ese hombre" | María Angélica Ramírez | 3:25 |
| 2. | "Vete ya" | Albert Hammond, Marti Sharron | 4:42 |
| 3. | "No hace falta más que dos" | Juan Carlos Duque, Myriam Hernández | 4:03 |
| 4. | "Inevitable" | Álvaro Scaramelli, Claude Gaudette, Greg Gerard | 4:00 |
| 5. | "Ayúdame" | Duque, Hernández | 3:00 |
| 6. | "Te extraño" | Alejandro Lerner | 4:15 |
| 7. | "Sentimental" | Hammond, Sharron | 3:35 |
| 8. | "Lloraré" | Myriam & Jaime Hernández | 3:39 |
| 9. | "Lo mejor que me ha pasado" | Scottie Scott | 3:43 |
| 10. | "Por siempre juntos" | David Foster, Hernández | 3:30 |

== Personnel ==
Credits adapted from the liner notes of Myriam Hernández IV.

- Humberto Gatica – production, recording, mastering, mixing
- Myriam Hernandez – co-production, vocals
- Wally Traugott – mastering
- Ronnie Rivera – mixing (assistant)
- Alejandro Rodriguez – additional engineering
- Matt Stephens – engineering (assistant)
- Tim Mariner – engineering (assistant)
- Aaron Zigman – piano, keyboards, arrangements (tracks: 2, 7)
- Claude Gaudette – piano, keyboards, arrangements (tracks: 1, 4, 6)
- David Foster – piano, keyboards, arrangements (tracks: 10)
- Mark Portmann – piano, keyboards, arrangements (tracks: 3, 5, 8, 9)
- David Campbell – string arrangements (tracks: 2)
- Jorge Calandrelli – string arrangements (tracks: 1, 2, 7)
- Kenny O'Brien – backing vocals
- Leyla Hoyle – backing vocals
- Terry Wood – backing vocals
- Dean Parks – acosutic guitar
- Michael Thompson – electric guitar
- Abraham Laboriel – bass
- Neil Stubenhaus – bass
- Gregg Bissonette – drums
- Mike Baird – drums
- Rafael Padilla – percussion
- Brandon Fields – saxophone
- Dick Hyde – trombone
- Chuck Findley – trumpet
- Greg Adams – trumpet
- Jorge Saint-Jean – executive producer
