= Hasta aquí =

Single by Myriam Hernández

from the album Sinergia
- Language: Spanish
- Released: July 23, 2021
- Genre: Latin pop
- Length: 3:01
- Label: JenesisPro
- Songwriter: Jacobo Calderón
- Producer: Jacobo Calderón

Myriam Hernández singles chronology
"Amorfoda (Respuesta)" (2020)	"Hasta aquí" (2021)	"Te quiero, ti amo" (2021)

Music video
- "Hasta aquí" on YouTube

"Hasta aquí" (lit. 'Up to Here') is a song by Chilean singer Myriam Hernández, written by Spanish musician Jacobo Calderón. The song was released independently on July 23, 2021, as the first single from her album Sinergia.

== Background ==
"Hasta aquí" was promoted as Hernandez' first official single in a decade, (Note: "Hasta aquí" is actually Hernandez' first single in approximately seven years if “Mi pequeño amor”, which was released on digital platforms in 2014, is also considered. On the other hand, the covers of "Sentirás mi amor" and "Amorfoda (Respuesta)" released in 2020 are not considered official singles by the artist.) and the lead single of Sinergia, her ninth studio album which was released the following year. It is also her first single produced by Jacobo Calderón, the son of Juan Carlos Calderón, the person behind her third studio album of 1992. Hernandez' vocals were recorded by Boris Milán in Miami, while the song was mixed by Oscar Vinader and Jacobo Calderón at Estudios Los Valles and Estudios Vivesporella, and mastered by Caco Refojo at Estudios PKO, in Madrid. Strings by the Bratislava Strings Orchestra were recorded by Martin Roller.

The main theme of the song is female empowerment, and Hernandez explained that its lyrics are about "a determined woman who no longer allows herself to be erased and, through this change, leaves traces upon which she builds a different life, with herself at the center". Regarding this change in the lyrics of her songs, as this new era of her career began to openly address feminist themes in her music, Hernández admitted to having changed her perspective on this matter: although she had previously stated that she was not a feminist, she eventually acknowledged she had been mistaken. She commented, "at some point, I was mistaken and thought I was not a feminist, but [then] I read, I informed myself, and I realized I was wrong [...] I had fallen into [a] caricature of feminism. However, currently I can say that yes, I [consider myself] a feminist," reason for which is why it currently made sense for her to perform songs with lyrics that address such themes.

Hernández received a very positive reaction from listeners after releasing this song, especially after to dozens of messages she received from several women victims of violence who felt identified with the song's message. Hernández explained further that the goal of the song is "to help women be able to say 'enough is enough' in a toxic relationship. To love themselves, to say 'this is where I stop letting myself be mistreated'".

== Music video ==
The music video for "Hasta aquí" was directed by Francisco Recabarren. Hernandez' daughter, Myriam Saint-Jean, also makes an appearance in the video.

== Track listing ==
Digital download
No.	Title	Writer(s)	Length
1.	"Hasta aquí"	Jacobo Calderón	3:01

== Personnel ==
Adapted from the credit notes published on Myriam Hernandez' official YouTube channel.

- Myriam Hernández – vocals
- Tony Mateos – drums
- Alfredo Paixão – bass
- Mario Hernández – Spanish guitar and vihuela
- François Legoffic – acoustic and electric guitar
- Jacobo Calderón – keyboards and programming
- Miguel López – trumpet
- Bratislava Strings Orchestra – strings
- David Hernando – conductor
