= Myriam Hernández =

Chilean singer, songwriter and television presenter

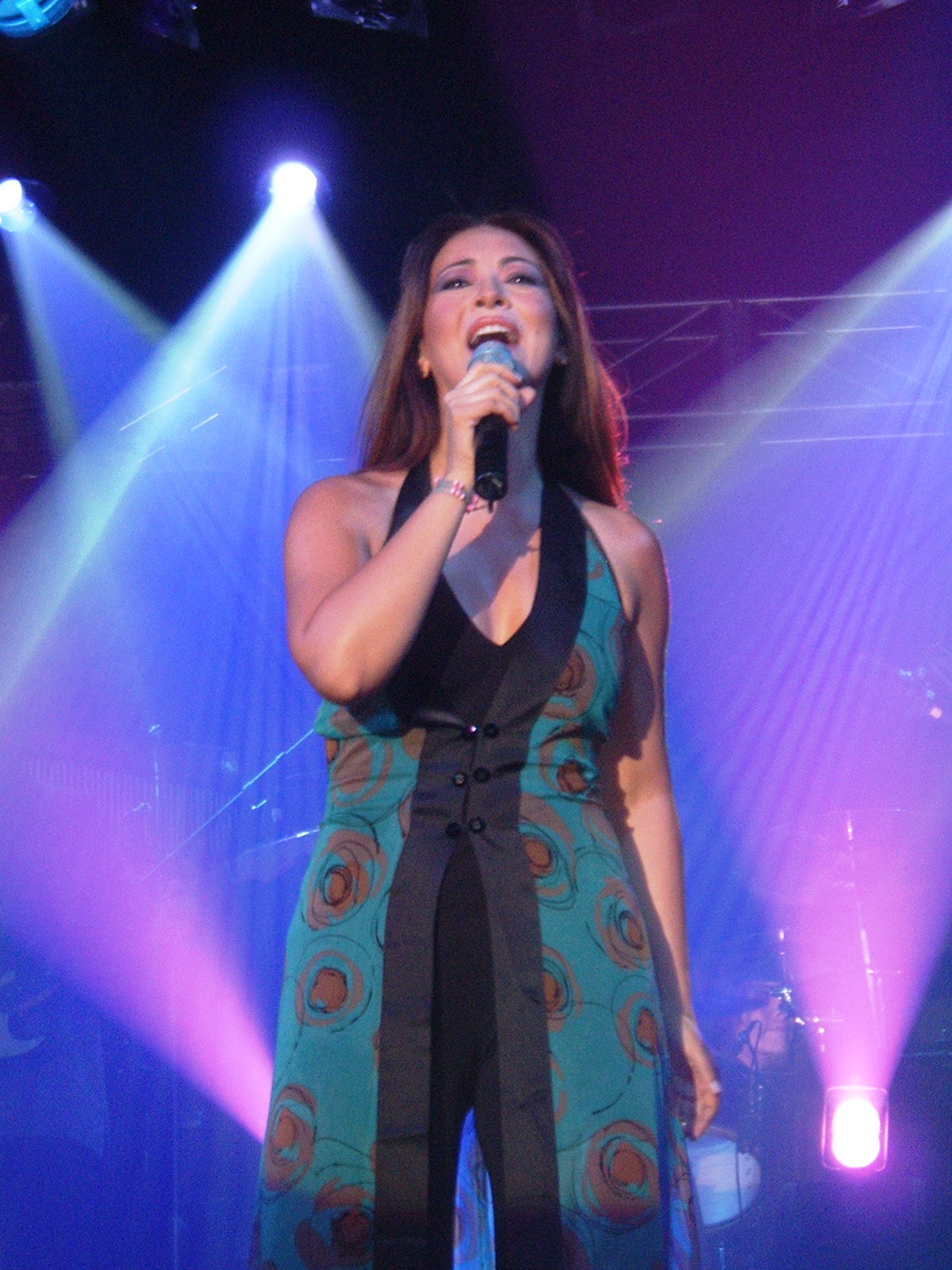
- Hernández performing in 2005
- Born: Myriam Raquel Hernández Navarro; 2 May 1965 (age 61); Santiago, Chile
- Occupations: Singer; songwriter
- Years active: 1988–present
- Spouse: Jorge Saint-Jean (m. 1992; div. 2024)
- Children: 2
- Musical career
- Genres: Latin pop; Latin ballad
- Instruments: Vocals
- Labels: EMI Odeón Chilena; EMI Latin; WEA Latina; Sony Music Chile; Universal Music Latin
- Website: myriamhernandez.us

Myriam Raquel Hernández Navarro (born 2 May 1965) is a Chilean singer, songwriter and television presenter. She has dabbled mainly in romantic ballad, which is why she is sometimes nicknamed "La baladista de América" ("America's balladeer"), although she has also fused her style with other genres such as electronics or hip-hop.

She began her musical career in the late 1980s with her album Myriam Hernández and the single "El hombre que yo amo" that reached No. 10 on Billboard's Hot Latin Tracks in 1989, while her first album reached No. 4 on Billboard's Latin Pop Songs the same year. She has released nine studio albums, two live albums, five compilation albums, two DVDs and 39 singles, including duets with various artists from the Ibero-American music scene such as Marco Antonio Solís, Cristian Castro or Gilberto Santa Rosa.

She has sold more than 10 million physical records worldwide, making her one of the best-selling Chilean music artist of all time. Thirteen of her singles have entered Billboard's Hot Latin Songs chart, with "Peligroso amor" and "Te pareces tanto a él" reaching number one, while her album Dos reached the same position on the Latin Pop Albums chart. On the Latin Pop Songs chart, "Huele a Peligro" and "Ese hombre" also reached number one.

In 2011, she was nominated for a Latin Grammy Award for Best Female Pop Vocal Album for her album Seducción and in 2015 she received the President's Merit Award from the Latin Recording Academy; in the same year she entered the Latin Songwriters Hall of Fame. In 2022, she received the Latin Grammy Lifetime Achievement Award, being the first female artist from her country to receive it.

She has also ventured into hosting and participating in various television programs in Chile, including sporadic participation as an actress. She co-hosted the Viña del Mar International Song Festival between 2002 and 2006, and has performed there as a headliner five times.

== Biography ==
Prior to her debut, she had television appearances on a handful of TV shows, including Generación Joven and La Pandilla, both by Televisión Nacional de Chile; also, she performed a small role in the soap opera De Cara al Mañana, where she appeared in five episodes.

In 1982, as a solo artist, she entered into the "Ranking Juvenil" (Juvenile Ranking) of Canal 13's "Sábados Gigantes" program, hosted by Don Francisco. At 18 she was named Artista Revelación (Best New Artist) by the Chilean press before having even recorded a single album.

In October 1988, Hernández released her first album under record label EMI entitled Myriam Hernández. In Chile, the record achieved gold status, and would later go quadruple platinum in – among other countries – the United States, Colombia, Peru, Ecuador, Bolivia, Puerto Rico, Costa Rica, and Panama. Thus began her international career. Two tracks on this album, "Ay Amor" and "El Hombre que Yo Amo", spent months at the top of music charts in Latin America and the United States In February 1989 she was a guest artist and jury member at the Festival de Viña del Mar.

In 1989, the Asociación de Periodistas de Espectáculos de Chile awarded Hernández the APES award for Best Female Performer and her album received the Best Record award. In July 1989, Billboard's Hot Latin scored her first success with "El Hombre que Yo Amo," and soon after in December her album was among the 10 best selling albums in the Latin world.

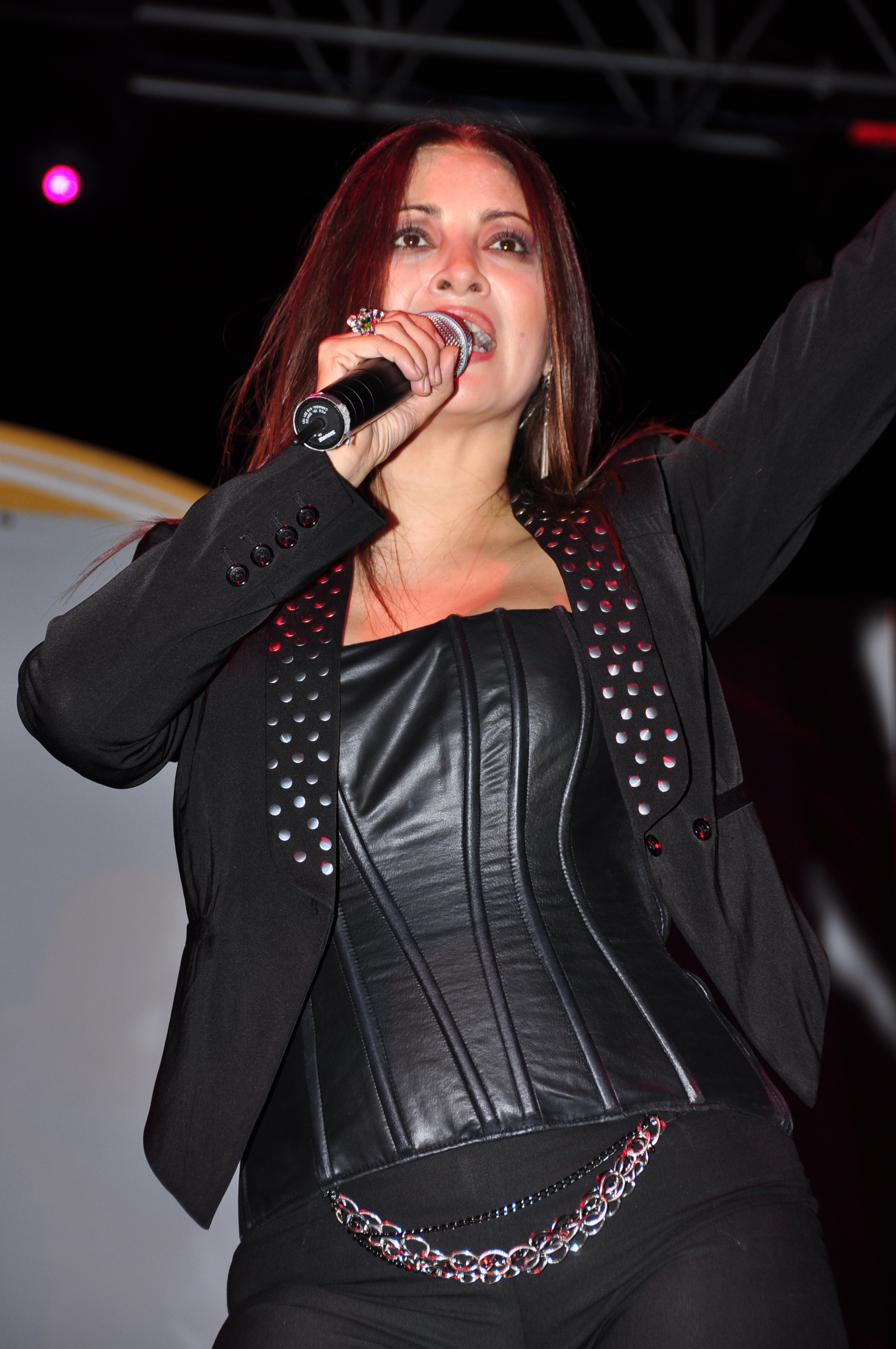
Hernández performing in Ecuador.

In Los Angeles in April 1989, Hernández began recording a second album, produced by Humberto Gatica, and on which collaborated David Foster, Jason Scheff (Chicago Group) and Lucho Gatica as executive producer. Noteworthy songs included "Te Pareces Tanto a Él", "Tonto", "Mío", "Peligroso Amor", and "Herida" (written by Hernández herself). The album remained on the Billboard charts from May 1990 to July 1991, with "Peligroso Amor" occupying the No. 1 spot for several weeks, followed by "Te Pareces Tanto a Él" and "Herida." This album held the No. 1 spot for Top Latin Albums for a record 18 consecutive weeks. "Peligroso Amor," whose video, produced by Luis de Lllano (Televisa-Mexico), was nominated for Billboard magazine's Best Latin Video.

Once again in 1991 Hernández was invited to the Viña del Mar International Song Festival where she received both the Antorcha and Gaviota de Plata awards. In Los Angeles in 1992 she recorded her third album produced by Spanish musician Juan Carlos Calderón and mixed by Humberto Gatica. All the songs were written by Juan Carlos Calderón, with the exception of "Mira", co-written by Myriam and Juan Carlos. The album's hits were "Un Hombre Secreto", "Se Me Fue", and "Si no Fueras Tú" . The album went Gold and Platinum in the US, Mexico, Central America, Venezuela, Colombia, Ecuador, Peru, and Chile. She also released albums in Japan, Thailand, Taiwan, and the United Arab Emirates.

In May 1992, Hernández performed at the Acapulco Festival, accompanied on the piano by Juan Carlos Calderón. The video for the song "Se me fue" was filmed in Los Angeles and was directed by U.S.-based Argentine director Gustavo Garzón.

Also in 1992, Hernández began a new project by founding the "School of Vocal Arts" along with her voice instructor, speech therapist Ricardo Álvarez. Among the professional artists to have gone through this school are Beto Cuevas, Lucybell, and Kudai. Her fourth album, released in 1994, was also produced in Los Angeles where she worked again with producer Humberto Gatica. From this album the song "Ese Hombre", by Chilean songwriter María Angélica Ramírez, won ASCAP's "Best Pop Ballad" of the year, as well as first place on the Billboard charts. In 1996, artist Paul Anka invited her to collaborate on an album of all-time Spanish hits called Amigos, on which they performed together the song "Tu Cabeza en Mi Hombro" (a Spanglish cover of Put Your Head on My Shoulder). Figures such as Céline Dion, Ricky Martin, Julio Iglesias, and Juan Gabriel also collaborated on that album, which was released by Sony.

In 1998, Hernández released Todo el Amor, her fifth studio album. Produced by Humberto Gatica and achieving success in all Spanish-language markets, including once again the United States, where the first single, "Huele a Peligro", by Armando Manzanero, quickly climbed to the first spot of Billboard magazine's Hot Latin Tracks. It also included hits such as "Deseo", written by Mónica Naranjo, and "La Fuerza del Amor", by Estéfano. The music video for the song "Huele a Peligro" was directed by Germán Bobe.

In 1998 Hernández was a guest on the Chilean program Gigante y Ud., along with Don Francisco, for two months. In the June 1999 issue of People En Español she was elected one of 25 Latin beauties, together with Ricky Martin and Spanish actor Antonio Banderas. In 2000, she released + y Más... with a large selection of producers and authors such as Kike Santander, Rudy Perez, Estéfano, Humberto Gatica, and Lester Mendez. Notable songs included "Mañana", "Quién Cuidará de Mí", "Si yo me Vuelvo a Enamorar", and "Leña y Fuego". The record went Gold and Platinum in various Latin American countries. The video for the song "Quién Cuidará de Mí" was directed by Carlos Markovic. In February 2001, at the Viña del Mar International Song Festival, she was awarded the Gaviota de Plata and Gaviota de Oro (Silver and Golden Seagulls) by the public.

In October 2001 Hernández gave two concerts at Santiago de Chile's Municipal Theater, a recording of which, El Amor en Concierto was released in Chile where it went Gold and Platinum. Based in Miami since 2000, she decided to make a foray into designer modeling photography for Italian brand Santini Mavardi and also agreed for the first time to associate her name with a commercial brand and act in an ad campaign for Procter & Gamble's "Head & Shoulders."

In 2002, Hernández debuted as host of the Viña del Mar International Song Festival, a competition held every year in Chile and in which she participated until 2006 alongside entertainers Antonio Vodanovic, Ricardo Montaner, and Sergio Lagos. She became the only woman to host for 25 nights with 3 different entertainers. She also was an entertainer on Chilean television programs such as "La Movida del Festival," "Con Mucho Cariño," "Protagonistas de la Música," and "La Noche del Mundial."

In 2004, Hernández released Huellas, a collection of her greatest hits including three never before-released songs. Armando Manzanero composed a new hit for her, "No te He Robado Nada", and Myriam Hernández and her son Jorge Ignacio, then only eight, composed the song "He Vuelto por Ti". The album included a new version of the song "Mio" recorded with Argentine group Los Nocheros as well as the song "El Amor de mi Vida", which featured Chilean hip-hop band Los Tetas. Huellas was released across Latin America and went Gold and Platinum. She also released her first DVD. In 2005, she produced her first live concert DVD-CD bundle entitled Contigo en Concierto.

In 2007, she released her seventh studio album Enamorándome, which became her first Billboard entry in the United States in 9 years, since Todo el amor released in 1998.

In 2009, she signed a contract with US-based label, Universal Music Latino (currently Universal Music Latin Entertainment). During this period, she also decided to move back to Chile along with her family, although maintaining her artistic base in Miami.

In 2010, she recorded a new song entitled "Rescátame", which was included in the soundtrack of Chilevisión's telenovela Mujeres de lujo. The song received significant radio airplay and achieved significant success in Chile.

In 2011, she released her eighth studio album, Seducción, which featured collaborations with Marco Antonio Solís and Cristian Castro. The album achieved platinum status in Chile, and granted Hernández first Latin Grammy nomination for Best Female Pop Vocal Album at the 12th Annual Latin Grammy Awards.

In 2014, she released the non-album single "Mi pequeño amor" on digital platforms. The song was part of the soundtrack of Canal 13's telenovela Valió la pena. Apart from this, her music activity was considerably limited for several years. During this period, she mostly focused on television, most remarkably in her role as coach on the TV show Yo Soy.

In 2015, she was inducted into the Latin Songwriters Hall of Fame during the third annual La Musa Awards.

During 2019, she embarked on her Soy Mujer international tour throughout Latin America. She also wrote a new song with the same title which she performed live on the tour.

In 2020, she released two stand-alone singles on digital platforms: "Sentirás mi amor", a cover with Spanish lyrics of Bob Dylan's song "Make You Feel My Love" popularized by Adele, and "Amorfoda (Respuesta)", a new version of Bad Bunny's "Amorfoda" with reformulated lyrics.

In 2021, Hernández made her official comeback to music in over a decade with her single "Hasta aquí", under the production of Jacobo Calderón (son of the producer of her 1992 third album, Juan Carlos Calderón).

In 2022, she released her ninth studio album, Sinergia, which became her first studio album in a decade, and also her first record released independently and exclusively on digital platforms. This same year, she received the Latin Grammy Lifetime Achievement Award for having made "creative contributions of outstanding artistic significance to Latin music and its communities".

In 2025, Hernández performed at the Viña del Mar Festival for the first time in two decades, and was awarded the Platinum Gaviota, becoming the fifth artist and first female performer to receive this ultimate honor in the 64-year history of the festival, following Luis Miguel, Juan Gabriel, Lucho Gatica, and Los Jaivas. This year she was also ranked the 32nd "Best Female Latin Pop Artist of All Time" by Billboard.

== Personal life ==
Hernández married Jorge Saint-Jean Domic, her then manager, on August 15, 1992. On December 27, 2024, they announced their divorce. The couple had two children: Jorge Ignacio (born 1994) and Myriam Isidora (born 1997).

== Discography ==
=== Studio albums ===
List of studio albums, with selected chart positions and certifications
Title	Album details	Peak chart positions		Certifications
Title	Album details	US Latin Pop	US Latin	Certifications
Myriam Hernández	Released: November 20, 1988; Label: EMI Odeon Chilena, Capitol/EMI Latin; Formats: Cassette, LP, CD, digital download, streaming	4	—	SCD (Note: Sociedad Chilena de Autores e Intérpretes Musicales (Chilean Association of Musical Authors and Performers).): 4× Platinum
Dos	Released: August 21, 1990; Label: EMI Odeon Chilena, Capitol/EMI Latin; Formats: Cassette, LP, CD, digital download, streaming	1	—	SCD: Gold
III	Released: July 7, 1992; Label: WEA Latina; Formats: Cassette, LP, CD	23	—	
IV	Released: December 13, 1994; Label: WEA Latina; Formats: Cassette, LP, CD	—	—	SCD: 2× Platinum
Todo el amor	Released: April 21, 1998; Label: Sony Music Chile, Sony Discos; Formats: Cassette, CD, digital download, streaming	8	18	
+ y más...	Released: August 29, 2000; Label: Sony Music Chile, Sony Discos; Formats: Cassette, CD, digital download, streaming	—	—	
Enamorándome	Released: August 28, 2007; Label: Sony-BMG Chile, La Calle Records; Formats: CD, digital download, streaming	10	49	
Seducción	Released: April 26, 2011; Label: Universal Music Latino; Formats: CD, digital download, streaming	11	39	SCD: Platinum
Sinergia	Released: May 27, 2022; Label: JenesisPro; Formats: Digital download, streaming	—	—	
Nuestra Navidad	Released: December 2, 2022; Label: JenesisPro; Formats: Digital download, streaming	—	—	
Tauro	Released: January 18, 2024; Label: JenesisPro; Formats: Digital download, streaming	—	—	
"—" denotes a title that was not released or did not chart in that territory

=== Compilation albums ===
- 1991: Mis mejores años
- 1992: Todo lo mío
- 1993: 17 Grandes éxitos
- 1995: Éxitos y recuerdos
- 1997: Lo Mejor
- 1998: Simplemente humana
- 2001: Solo lo mejor: 20 éxitos
- 2004: Huellas
- 2018: 10 grandes éxitos

=== Live albums ===
- 2001: El amor en concierto
- 2005: Contigo en concierto

=== Singles ===
Title	Year	Peak chart positions	Album
Title	Year	US Latin	Album
"Ay amor"	1988	15	Myriam Hernández
"El hombre que yo amo"	1988	10	Myriam Hernández
"Quiero saber"	1988	—	Myriam Hernández
"Eres"	1988	—	Myriam Hernández
“No es preciso”	1989	—	Myriam Hernández
“Mío”	1990	—	Dos
“Peligroso amor”	1990	1	Dos
“Herida”	1990	3	Dos
“Te pareces tanto a él”	1990	1	Dos
“Tonto”	1991	—	Dos
“Un hombre secreto”	1992	4	III
“Si no fueras tú”	1992	8	III
“Yo soy la única”	1993	─	III
“Se me fue”	1993	14	III
“Ese hombre”	1994	6	IV
“No hace falta más que dos”	1994	25	IV
“Lloraré”	1995	—	IV
“Lo mejor que me ha pasado”	1995	—	IV
“Huele a peligro”	1998	5	Todo el amor
“La fuerza del amor”	1998	—	Todo el amor
“Deseo”	1998	—	Todo el amor
“Me vas a querer”	1999	—	Todo el amor
“No puedo olvidarte”	1999	—	Todo el amor
“Mañana”	2000	—	+ y más...
“Quién cuidará de mí”	2000	—	+ y más...
“Cenicienta de tu amor”	2000	—	+ y más...
“Leña y fuego”	2001	—	+ y más...
“Si yo me vuelvo a enamorar”	2001	—	+ y más...
“No te he robado nada”	2004	—	Huellas
“He vuelto por ti”	2004	—	Huellas
“El amor de mi vida” (feat. Los Tetas and DJ Ju)	2004	—	Huellas
“Mío” (feat. Los Nocheros)	2005	—	Huellas
“No pensé enamorarme otra vez” (with Gilberto Santa Rosa)	2007	28	Enamorándome
“Donde estará mi primavera”	2007	49	Enamorándome
“Vuela muy alto”	2007	—	Enamorándome
“Rescátame”	2010	—	Non-album single
“Sigue sin mí” (with Marco Antonio Solís)	2011	—	Seducción
“Si pudiera amarte”	2011	—	Seducción
“Todo en tu vida” (with Cristian Castro)	2012	—	Seducción
“Mi pequeño amor”	2014	—	Non-album single
“Sentirás mi amor”	2020	—	Non-album single
“Amorfoda (Respuesta)”	2020	—	Non-album single
“Hasta aquí”	2021	—	Sinergia
“Te quiero, ti amo”	2021	—	Sinergia
“Ya es tarde”	2021	—	Sinergia
“Dunas” (with Javiera Mena)	2021	—	Nocturna
“Mi paraíso”	2022	—	Sinergia
“Luz”	2022	—	Nuestra Navidad
“Navidad Navidad”	2022	—	Nuestra Navidad
“Estaré en mi casa esta Navidad”	2022	—	Nuestra Navidad
“Noche de paz”	2022	—	Nuestra Navidad
“Nuestra canción de Navidad”	2022	—	Nuestra Navidad
“Ecco” (with Franco Simone)	2023	—	Non-album single
“Nos lo hemos dicho todo”	2023	—	Tauro
“Invencible”	2023	—	Tauro
“Solo cuídate y adiós”	2023	—	Tauro
“Con los cinco sentidos”	2023	—	Tauro
“No siempre es Navidad”	2023	—	Nuestra Navidad (Edición especial)
“Campanas de plata”	2023	—	Nuestra Navidad (Edición especial)
“Gracias a la vida” (with Mocedades)	2023	—	Non-album single
“Mi burrito sabanero”	2023	—	Nuestra Navidad (Edición especial)
“Ternura” (with Franco Simone)	2024	—	Non-album single
“No x él” (with Karen Paola)	2025	—	Non-album single
“Yo no me rendiré” (with Flor de Rap)	2025	—	Non-album single
"—" denotes a recording that did not chart or was not released in that territory.
