= Betty Pino =

Ecuadorian radio personality

- Born: Beatriz Pino; April 21, 1948; Ancón, Ecuador
- Died: August 7, 2013 (aged 65); Miami
- Citizenship: Ecuador; United States of America
- Occupations: Radio host, announcer
- Children: 2

Betty Pino, born Beatriz Pino and also known as La Reina de la Radio (21 April 1948 – 7 August 2013), was an Ecuadorian radio host and announcer.

== Biography ==
Betty Pino was born in Ancón, Ecuador on 21 April 1948, but grew up, went to school, and worked in Quito. From an early age, Pino had an interest in radio and it became her dream to become an internationally recognized radio star. At 14, she made her first foray into radio at a local station in Quito. Around this time, Pino and her family immigrated to the United States of America and she found work as a maid in a luxury hotel and at a cafe. In 1973, Pino landed a job as a receptionist at a radio station in Miami, Florida and the next year became the city's first female DJ for WCMQ-FM.

Years later, Pino arrived at Univision's Amor 107.5 FM and hosted a weekly music and entertainment show. Very quickly, she became very popular to listeners and many Hispanic artists and personalities and earned the nickname "La Reina de la Radio," or "The Queen of the Radio" in Miami. Throughout Latin America, she became known as "La Gurú del mundo del disco," "The Guru of the Disc World," for her ability to predict which songs would become a hit. Examples include Roberto Torres's cover of Caballo Viejo, Macarena by Los del Río, La Gota Fría by Carlos Vives, and El hombre que yo amo by Myriam Hernández, among others. Among the artists that Pino counted as her friends are Myriam Hernández, Raphael, Sandro, Braulio García, Dyango, Rocío Jurado, and Julio Iglesias.

== Death ==
On 15 July 2013, Pino entered the Doctors Hospital of Coral Gables in Miami, Florida for a bacterial infection. However, when antibiotics failed to better her condition, she was placed in a medically-induced coma and then died at the Jackson Memorial Hospital at 2 AM EST, 7 August 2013. When news hit the music world, an outpouring of grief was expressed by such personalities as Myriam Hernández, Julio Iglesias, Dyango, Raphael, Ricardo Montaner, Luis Fonsi, Olga Tañón, Willie Colón, Shakira, Laura Pausini, Chayanne, Douglas Bastidas, Carlos Baute, María Celeste Arrarás, Roberto Angelelli, Javier Romero, and Pepe Forte. She is survived by her two daughters, Beatriz and Christina.
