= Todo el Amor =

Studio album by Myriam Hernández
- Released: April 21, 1998
- Studio: Andora, L.A., CA; Fonoprint Studio Bologna-Itali; Record Planet, L.A., CA; Simply Audio; WestLake, L.A., CA
- Length: 48:00
- Label: Sony Music Chile; Sony Discos
- Producer: Walter Afanasieff • Humberto Gatica • Myriam Hernández • Celso Valli

Myriam Hernández chronology
Lo Mejor (1997)	Todo el Amor (1998)	+ y más... (2000)

Todo el Amor (All the Love) is the fifth studio album by Chilean singer Myriam Hernández. The album was nominated "Latin Pop Album of the Year by a Female Artist" at the 1999 Billboard Latin Music Awards. The album is her first under Sony Discos having previously signed on to Warner Music Latina. It contains the lead single "Huele a Peligro" which reached #1 on the Latin Pop Airplay chart in the United States.

== Commercial performance ==
The album reported sales of 50,000 copies in the US and Latin America.

== Track listing ==
The information from AllMusic.

No.	Title	Writer(s)	Length
1.	"Huele a Peligro"	Armando Manzanero	4:59
2.	"Me Vas a Querer"	Juan Andrés Ossandón, Tatiana Bustos	04:19
3.	"Deseo"	Cristobal Sansano, Mónica Naranjo	04:16
4.	"La Fuerza del Amor"	Estéfano	05:01
5.	"Amor Secreto"	Kike Santander	03:33
6.	"No Puedo Olvidarte"	Pablo Herrera	04:41
7.	"El Hombre Equivacado"	Ossandon	04:04
8.	"Ya No Podrás"	Ossandón	04:32
9.	"Me Traicionas"	Ossandón	04:03
10.	"De Soledad"	Esteban Fuentes, Humberto Gatica	04:16
11.	"Quién Va a Saber"	Estéfano	04:16

== Charts ==
Chart (1998)	Peak position
US Top Latin Albums (Billboard)	18
US Latin Pop Albums (Billboard)	8
