= Tauro =

Tauro may refer to:

- Tauro F.C., a professional football club in Panama City, Panama
- Tauro Sport Auto, a Spanish manufacturer of luxury sports cars
- Anahuac Tauro, a Mexican agricultural aircraft
- a brand of beer by Piedboeuf Brewery
- A breed of cattle, bred by the Taurus Project
- Tauro, 2024 album by Myriam Hernández

== People with the surname ==
- G. Joseph Tauro (1906—1994), Chief Justice of the Massachusetts Supreme Judicial Court; father of Joseph Louis Tauro
- Joseph L. Tauro (1931–2018), United States federal judge; son of G. Joseph Tauro
- Shacky Tauro (1959–2009), Zimbabwean football player and coach
