= Nuestra Navidad =

- Regular edition cover

Studio album by Myriam Hernández
- Released: December 2, 2022 (Regular edition); December 2, 2023 (Special edition)
- Genre: Christmas music, Latin pop
- Label: JenesisPro
- Producer: Jacobo Calderón

Myriam Hernández chronology
Sinergia (2022)	Nuestra Navidad (2022)	Tauro (2024)

Nuestra Navidad (Spanish: [ˈnwestɾa naβiˈðað], lit. 'Our Christmas') is the tenth studio album and first Christmas album by Chilean singer Myriam Hernández. It was released independently on December 2, 2022.

== Background ==
Hernandez' first Christmas album released a few months after Sinergia, becoming her second studio album of 2022 (and marking first time in her career in which she released two albums in one year). The album comprises ten classic Christmas songs plus two original songs penned by Jacobo Calderón, who also produced Hernandez' previous record. The songs were recorded between studios in Miami and Madrid by Calderón and sound engineer Boris Milán, and featured the Bratislava Symphony Orchestra in strings, the same team involved in Sinergia.

About the conception of this album, Hernandez stated that it was "an idea that had been latent, and I owed it to myself for about 30 years. My manager always had it as a project, and I kept refusing to do it because I was not crazy about the idea of singing Christmas carols, until during the [COVID 19] pandemic we did a Christmas concert via streaming under the premise of accompanying the audience in their homes, and something magical happened [...] I became fascinated with the songs I chose for that occasion because I reconnected with some songs that were always part of my family celebrations, so it was very inspiring to work on my own versions".

In December 2023, the album was re-issued as a special edition featuring eight additional tracks.

== Track listing ==
Digital release - Regular edition (2022)
No.	Title	Writer(s)	Length
1.	"Te deseo muy felices fiestas"		3:55
2.	"Noche de paz"		3:03
3.	"Santa Claus llegó a la ciudad"		2:24
4.	"Luz"	Jacobo Calderón	3:36
5.	"Navidad Navidad"		2:22
6.	"Blanca Navidad"		3:52
7.	"Estaré en mi casa esta Navidad"		2:54
8.	"El tamborilero"		2:57
9.	"Nuestra canción de Navidad"	Jacobo Calderón	3:36
10.	"Jingle Bell Rock"		2:03
11.	"A sus pies"		4:30
12.	"Christmas Happy Christmas" (feat. Mocedades)	Juan Carlos Calderón	4:30

Digital release - Special edition (2023)
No.	Title	Length
1.	"Va a nevar" (*)	2:44
2.	"Noche de paz"	3:03
3.	"Navidad Navidad"	2:22
4.	"Luz"	3:36
5.	"Campanas de plata" (*)	2:31
6.	"Te deseo muy felices fiestas"	3:01
7.	"No siempre es Navidad" (*)	2:54
8.	"Santa Claus llegó a la ciudad"	2:24
9.	"Ven a mi casa esta Navidad" (*)	3:24
10.	"Blanca navidad"	3:38
11.	"Frente a la chimenea" (*)	2:56
12.	"Estaré en mi casa esta Navidad"	2:54
13.	"Mi burrito sabanero" (*)	3:06
14.	"El tamborilero"	2:57
15.	"Nuestra canción de Navidad"	3:36
16.	"Jingle Bell Rock"	2:54
17.	"A sus pies"	4:30
18.	"Christmas Happy Christmas" (feat. Mocedades)	2:36

(*) New recording.
