= Tauro (album) =

Studio album by Myriam Hernández
- Released: January 18, 2024
- Genre: Latin pop, Latin ballad
- Label: JenesisPro
- Producer: Myriam Hernández, Jacobo Calderón

Myriam Hernández chronology
Nuestra Navidad (2022)	Tauro (2024)

Tauro (Spanish: [ˈtawɾo], lit. 'Taurus') is the eleventh studio album by Chilean singer Myriam Hernández. It was released independently on January 18, 2024.

== Background ==
Tauro is the third album by Hernandez produced by Jacobo Calderón, whom she described as her current "artistic ally". The album title, apart from referencing Hernández's astrological sign, was chosen because it represented "the strength, personality, determination, and temperament" of the record.

The album was preceded by the singles "Nos lo hemos dicho todo", "Invencible", "Solo cuídate y adiós", and "Con los cinco sentidos", which amassed over 11 million streams on YouTube and Spotify. In addition to the singles, the album included six previously unreleased songs. Each song was accompanied by its own music video, which was made available on Hernandez' official YouTube channel.

About the creative process for each song, Hernandez commented "The songs come to life gradually. I let them flow a bit through intuition, through feeling. With "Nos lo hemos dicho todo", the song probably crossed my mind earlier, but it was born at that [specific] moment. The creative process generates stories. That's often linked to things that happen to me, to others, or even to Jacobo himself. Sometimes, by sharing those experiences, songs are created".

Similar to her previous two albums since Hernandez began releasing music independently, Tauro was only released on digital format. In this respect, Hernandez expressed a sense of nostalgia for physical albums, and acknowledged that there are people who also miss the experience of buying records. However, she appreciated that nowadays it is possible to upload songs to streaming platforms and be nearly instantaneously connected with her audience. Hernández expressed her feelings on how this shift has created a sense of greater closeness and global interconnectedness, stating that "When we release something, people from all over are enjoying it simultaneously. Today, there’s more closeness, more globalization, and that’s something to be grateful for".

== Critical reception ==
Writing for Expectador Magazine, music journalist Felipe León stated that Tauro "reclaims [Hernandez'] most classic and sophisticated style, where various interpretations of love coexist, filled with drama and untamed passion. These are distinctive elements when conveying bittersweet emotions immersed in melancholy and the fire of memory, alongside more upbeat songs. The singer is essential for inhabiting these pieces due to her vast musical experience". According to León, although Hernández does not stray far from her usual adult contemporary style, this album stands out for the vitality of its tracks, gaining emotional power that is hard to ignore. He deemed "Como el aire", "Nos lo hemos dicho todo" and "Solo cuídate y adiós" as highlights on the album.

== Track listing ==
All tracks are written by Jacobo Calderón.

Digital release
No.	Title	Length
1.	"Como el aire"	3:40
2.	"Nos lo hemos dicho todo"	4:13
3.	"Solo cuídate y adiós"	4:17
4.	"Con los cinco sentidos"	3:21
5.	"Invencible"	3:56
6.	"Empatados"	4:19
7.	"Me acostumbré a dormir sin ti"	4:24
8.	"Pa ti pa mí"	3:00
9.	"Maldita nostalgia"	3:56
10.	"Tú"	3:49
