= Dos (Myriam Hernández album) =

Studio album by Myriam Hernández
- Released: August 21, 1990
- Recorded: 1989–1990
- Studio: Chartmaker Studios (Malibu, California); Santa Monica Sound Studios (Santa Monica, California); Wildtracks Recording Studio; Lion Share Studios; Estudios 55 (Los Angeles, California)
- Genre: Latin pop · Latin ballad
- Label: Capitol/EMI Latin
- Producer: Humberto Gatica · Jorge Saint-Jean (Executive producer)

Myriam Hernández chronology
Myriam Hernández (1988)	Dos (1990)	III (1992)

Dos (English: Two), also known as Myriam Hernández 2, is the second studio album recorded by Chilean singer-songwriter Myriam Hernández, It was released by Capitol/EMI Latin on August 21, 1990. The album became very successful in Latin America and the United States where it peaked at number one in the Billboard Latin Pop Albums chart. The album includes two number-one singles by Hernández, "Te Pareces Tanto a Él" and "Peligroso Amor", and her self-penned top three hit "Herida". Dos was nominated for Pop Album of the Year at the Lo Nuestro Awards.

Dos was produced by Humberto Gatica and features songs written by Gogo Muñoz, Alberto Plaza, Vilma Planas, Alvaro Torres, Juan Carlos Duque and by the performer herself. Hernández wrote the songs "Herida" and "Que No". The album singles produced several international hits that spent several weeks at number one of the rankings in the continent. This album also marked a record in the Latin Pop Albums in the United States by staying at number-one for 18 consecutive weeks.

"Herida" was covered by Brenda K. Starr in a salsa version which reached number one on the Latin Tropical Airplay chart; Mexican singer Lidia Ávila also recorded her rendition in a cumbia version; and Brazilian singer Daniel also released his take on the track. Hernández recorded the song "Mira", co-written with Juan Carlos Calderón, on her self-titled 1992 album as a follow-up for the song. The music video for "Peligroso Amor" was produced by Luis De Llano and received a nomination for the Billboard Best Latin Video award. Dos sold 15,000 units in Chile in less than two weeks of release, and was awarded with a Gold album certification. The success of this album resulted in a recording contract with Warner Music México, but the contract ended because of the limited success of her next album and disagreements between the label and the singer.

== Track listing ==
The information from the album liner notes.

No.	Title	Writer(s)	Length
1.	"Peligroso Amor"	Gogo Muñoz	4:07
2.	"Mío"	G. Muñoz	3:26
3.	"Que No"	Myriam Hernández	3:18
4.	"Sabía"	Alberto Plaza	3:36
5.	"Todo lo Tuyo"	G. Muñoz · Vilma Planas	3:30
6.	"Te Pareces Tanto a Él"	Alvaro Torres	3:46
7.	"Herida"	M. Hernández	4:02
8.	"Toda la Vida Fue Igual"	Juan Carlos Duque	3:17
9.	"Tonto"	G. Muñoz	3:17
10.	"Ni Tonta Sigo Amándote"	J.C. Duque	3:15

== Charts ==
Chart (1990)	Peak position
US Latin Pop Albums (Billboard)	1

== See also ==
- List of number-one Billboard Latin Pop Albums from the 1990s
