= Myriam Hernández (album) =

Studio album by Myriam Hernández
- Released: November 20, 1988
- Recorded: 1988
- Genre: Latin pop, Latin ballad
- Label: EMI Odeon Chilena; Capitol Records/EMI Latin
- Producer: Juan Carlos Duque

Myriam Hernández chronology
Myriam Hernández (1988)	Dos (1990)

Myriam Hernández is the debut studio album by the Chilean artist of the same name. It was released in Chile on November 20, 1988, through EMI Odeon Chilena (label owned by EMI Group). The album was subsequently released in the United States and Canada through Capitol Records/EMI Latin.

== Background ==
Myriam Hernández began her music career on Sábado Gigante in 1982, where she became part of a segment called Ranking Juvenil (Youth Ranking), where various singers performed covers of popular songs. Originally, the winners of the Youth Ranking on the show were offered the opportunity to 7-inch record with a record company. However, when Hernández won, that prize was no longer being offered. When she was first offered a record deal, she had been already requesting songs from composers she admired; during this time, it is when musicians Nano Prado and John Eliott presented Hernández with "Ay amor", which would later become her debut single. Hernández submitted the song to her potential label; however, they told her the song "would not work", and instead, they suggested whether she sang more aggressive songs, or become a rock singer. Later, the producers conducted an experiment with Hernández by having her perform a rock song on Sábado Gigante to gauge the audience's reaction. Upon seeing that the audience's reaction was positive, they informed Hernández that should she sign a deal with them, she would be pursuing a career in rock, even planning on changing her stage name to "Myriam E". This devastated Hernández, as she wanted to pursue a career as a balladist, and determined to follow her idea, she then decided to use her own money to record the song, and subsequently send it herself to radio stations. The recording of "Ay amor" was arranged by Claudio Riquelme (Hernández' then-manager), and was in charge of fellow musician Juan Antonio Labra, who did it pro bono. Riquelme sent the song to EMI, under the promise that a contract would be subsequently entered into by Hernandez and the label.

In mid-1988, Televisión Nacional de Chile released the soundtrack of its TV soap opera Bellas y audaces, which featured "Ay amor", and became a commercial success. However, the song had been included without obtaining the proper permissions on Hernández' part. When Riquelme discovered the unauthorized sale of the track, he recalled, "Suddenly, I found out they had never signed a contract with us, but they had sold the song, which was a complete illegality. If you don’t have a contract, how can you sell it for an album that wasn’t even theirs? There was no contract, nothing at all". The logical following move would have been to file a lawsuit, but such irregular situation became a leverage to make the record label agree to record Hernández's album.

To produce the album, Riquelme enlisted Argentine composer Gogo Muñoz, who provided three songs, "Corazón desorientado", "Eres", and "El hombre que yo amo", which subsequently became Hernández's breakthrough hit. Muñoz focused on creating love songs rather than heartbreak anthems, as they were more in line with the public’s interests at the time in Latin pop. Although Hernández was initially skeptical about Muñoz’s style, she was eventually convinced after hearing the song.

The album was produced by Chilean musician Juan Carlos Duque, and also features Hernandez' first-penned song "No pienso enamorarme otra vez".

== Commercial and chart performance ==
The album was certified quadruple platinum in Chile, with over 125,000 copies sold.

In the United States, the album received gold status and became the ninth best-selling Latin album of 1990, staying on the Billboard Latin Pop Albums chart for 43 weeks. In total, the album's reported sales amount to 500,000 copies internationally, including the editions released in North and South America.

== Awards ==
The album was awarded Best Record of the Year ("Mejor Producción Musical del Año") at the Chilean Entertainment Journalists' Association (APES) Awards of 1989. Additionally, it earned Hernandez her first nomination at the 1990 Lo Nuestro Awards for New Pop Artist of the Year.

== Track listing ==
Side one
No.	Title	Writer(s)	Length
1.	"El hombre que yo amo"	Gogo Muñoz	3:26
2.	"Quiero saber"	Juan Carlos Duque	3:18
3.	"Ay amor"	John Eliott, Nano Prado	3:33
4.	"Sin querer"	Ignacio Loyola	3:35
5.	"Has dado en el blanco"	I. Simonds	3:00

Side two
No.	Title	Writer(s)	Length
6.	"No pienso enamorarme otra vez"	Myriam Hernández	2:27
7.	"Corazón desorientado"	Gogo Muñoz	3:07
8.	"No es preciso"	Ignacio Loyola	3:46
9.	"Quiero cantarle al amor"	John Eliott, Nano Prado	3:12
10.	"Eres"	Gogo Muñoz	3:48

== Personnel ==
Credits adapted from the liner notes of Myriam Hernández.

- Myriam Hernández – vocals
- Juan Carlos Ruiz - sound engineering, mixing
- Tito Astete - mixing
- Juan Carlos Duque - music production, directing
- Reiner Meric - cover design
- Héctor Ruz - photography

== Charts ==
Chart (1990)	Peak position
US Latin Pop Albums (Billboard)	4
