= Te quiero, ti amo =

Single by Myriam Hernández

from the album Sinergia
- Language: Spanish
- Released: September 3, 2021
- Genre: Latin pop
- Length: 3:12
- Label: JenesisPro
- Songwriter: Jacobo Calderón
- Producer: Jacobo Calderón

Myriam Hernández singles chronology
"Hasta aquí" (2021)	"Te quiero, ti amo" (2021)	"Ya es tarde" (2021)

Music video
- "Te quiero, ti amo" on YouTube

"Te quiero, ti amo" (lit. 'I Want You, I Love You') is a song by Chilean singer Myriam Hernández, written by Spanish musician Jacobo Calderón. The song was released independently on September 3, 2021, as the second single from her album Sinergia.

== Background ==
This song was released the second single from the album Sinergia following "Hasta aquí", although it was actually the last song that made it to the album. Hernández stated: "Only a day before traveling to Miami to record the album, Jacobo sent me this song, and I was completely captivated by its lyrics and beautiful, contagious melody, so I didn't hesitate for a minute and decided that instead of ten, there would be eleven songs on Sinergia". Hernandez' vocals were recorded by Boris Milán in Miami, while the song was mixed and mastered by Oscar Vinader and Jacobo Calderón at Estudios Los Valles and Estudios Vivesporella, in Madrid.

The song has been described as a "bright and refreshing pop song" and it incorporates tropical house elements, which represents a slight shift from Hernández's characteristic pop ballads. Hernández refuted opinions that deemed "Te quiero, ti amo" as being reggaeton-influenced, stating "no, it is [a very] pop [song], [although] it incorporates very modern sounds which are also used in urban genres".

== Music video ==
The music video for "Te quiero, ti amo" was directed by Francisco Recabarren, who was also in charge of directing "Hasta aquí". The video shows Hernández surrounded by a large number of flowers in various colors.

== Track listing ==
Digital download
No.	Title	Writer(s)	Length
1.	"Te quiero, ti amo"	Jacobo Calderón	3:12

== Personnel ==
Adapted from the credit notes published on Myriam Hernandez' official YouTube channel.

- Myriam Hernández – vocals
- Jacobo Calderón – keyboards, programming, arrangements, production, mixing, mastering
- Adrián Guiardo – keyboards, programming
- Oscar Vinader – mixing, mastering
