= Seducción (Myriam Hernández album) =

Studio album by Myriam Hernández
- Released: April 26, 2011
- Recorded: 2010–2011
- Genre: Latin pop, Latin ballad
- Label: Universal Music Latino
- Producer: Myriam Hernández, Jorge Luis Piloto, Manny López

Myriam Hernández chronology
Enamorándome (2007)	Seducción (2011)	Sinergia (2022)

Seducción is the eighth studio album by Chilean singer Myriam Hernández. It was released on April 26, 2011, through Universal Music Latino.

== Background ==
Following the release of Enamorándome, Hernandez embarked on an extensive promotional tour, which spanned three years and totalled dozens of live shows. In 2009, she also entered into a contract with US-based label, Universal Music Latino (currently Universal Music Latin Entertainment). During this period, she decided to move back to Chile with her family as well, but maintaining her artistic base in Miami. In this respect, she declared "I decided to return to Chile for the sake of my family, making sure that my children could experience their adolescence close to their grandparents, cousins, uncles, and [the rest of our extended] family. I decided to come back, and they are happy. I still have my house in Miami, and in a way, I’m always traveling, with one foot here and one foot there, but giving [my] kids more stability".

Similar to her previous record, the album was produced by Hernández along with Manny Lopez and Jorge Luis Piloto. For the album, which consists of ten songs, Hernandez recorded duets with Marco Antonio Solís and Cristian Castro, becoming the first time she collaborates directly with these artists (she had previously recorded covers by them on her previous album). Hernandez insisted on recording the duets in person, and not "record in another studio and send her part over the internet".

Hernandez described Seducción as "an album that brings surprises, singing about love as always, with different stories and different nuances", and "In addition to having this album with unreleased songs, I also recorded these two duets with artists I love dearly and admire deeply".

Hernández's 2010 song "Rescátame", which was included in the soundtrack of Chilevisión's soap opera Mujeres de lujo and achieved significant success in Chile, was originally planned to be part of this album as well, but was ultimately not included.

== Critical reception ==
Writing for El Mercurio, music journalist Marisol García analyzed Hernández's exploration new thematic territories on Seducción. García highlighted how the Chilean singer, known for her portrayal of romantic and reciprocal love, turns her attention to themes of lost relationships and emotional reflection. She noted that the most striking departure comes in the song "La decisión", where Hernández finds herself torn between two loves, marking the first time she addresses such a theme in her music. The critic praised Hernández for venturing into these new emotional landscapes, signaling the singer's continued artistic growth. However, she also points out that the album remains musically conservative, relying on a soft, almost overly shiny electric pop sound. This musical style, although skillfully executed by producer Manny López, does not fully capture the richness of Hernandez' voice and the emotional depth her lyrics convey. While Hernandez' vocal talent shines through, particularly in softer ballads like "Te amo tanto" and more powerful choruses in songs like "Yo me equivoqué", García expressed a desire for a more dynamic and daring instrumental arrangement. She suggested that the album could benefit from bolder musical choices that allow Hernández to assert herself as a leading figure in the music industry, a trend-setter rather than a mere follower. Overall, García acknowledged Hernandez' artistry and vocal prowess, but wished for a more innovative musical backing that could have elevated the album even further.

The album was nominated Best Female Pop Vocal Album at the 12th Annual Latin Grammy Awards, granting Hernandez her first Latin Grammy nomination.

== Promotion ==
Shortly after the release of the album, Hernandez embarked on her Seducción tour, in which she held live shows in Panamá, Colombia, the Dominican Republic, Peru, Ecuador, Bolivia, Costa Rica, Nicaragua, Honduras, Argentina, the United States, and Chile.

== Commercial and chart performance ==
Seducción peaked at number 39 on the Billboard Top Latin Albums, and at number 11 on the Latin Pop Albums chart.

In Chile, the album achieved gold status 48 hours after its official release. In January 2012, it achieved platinum status for over 10,000 copies sold in her home country

== Track listing ==
CD
No.	Title	Writer(s)	Length
1.	"Después de tu amor"	Jorge Luis Piloto, Manuel Lopez	3:49
2.	"Sigue sin mí" (with Marco Antonio Solís)	Marco Antonio Solís	3:32
3.	"Si pudiera amarte"	Piloto, Myriam Hernández	4:42
4.	"Todo en tu vida" (with Cristian Castro)	Piloto, Lopez	3:25
5.	"Tu tiempo pasó"	Piloto, Lopez	4:07
6.	"No se ve"	Piloto, Yoel Henríquez	4:16
7.	"Ni una vez más"	César Franco, Daniel Betancourt	4:09
8.	"La decisión"	Piloto, Lopez	3:49
9.	"Yo me equivoqué"	Piloto, Lopez	4:01
10.	"Te amo tanto"	Piloto, Henríquez	4:13

== Charts ==
Chart (2011)	Peak position
US Latin Pop Albums (Billboard)	11
US Top Latin Albums (Billboard)	39
