= Ese Hombre (Nydia Caro song) =

1994 single by Myriam Hernández

Single by Myriam Hernández

from the album Myriam Hernández IV
- Released: 1994
- Recorded: 1994
- Genre: Latin pop · Latin ballad
- Length: 4:13
- Label: WEA Latina
- Songwriter: María Angélica Ramírez
- Producer: Humberto Gatica

Myriam Hernández singles chronology
"Se Me Fué" (1993)	"Ese Hombre" (1994)	"No Hace Falta Más Que Dos" (1995)

"Ese Hombre" (English: "That Man") is a song written by María Angélica Ramírez and first performed by Puerto Rican singer Nydia Caro on her album Unicornio Azul (1983). It was later covered by Chilean singer Myriam Hernández on her album Myriam Hernández IV in 1994. The album marked Hernández's return to the music scene after taking a break from recording for nearly two years. It was recorded in Los Angeles, California and produced by Humberto Gatica. The song became Hernández first number one song on the Billboard Latin Pop Airplay chart and ended the year as the best-performing Latin pop song in the United States. It was recognized as one of best-performing songs of the year at the 1996 ASCAP Latin Awards. A music video for "Ese Hombre" was filmed as well.

== Charts ==
=== Weekly charts ===
Chart (1995)	Peak position
Chile (UPI)	3
Panama (UPI)	2
Puerto Rico (UPI)	3
US Hot Latin Songs (Billboard)	6
US Latin Pop Airplay (Billboard)	1

=== Year-end charts ===
Chart (1995)	Peak position
US Latin Songs (Billboard)	37
US Latin Pop Airplay (Billboard)	1

== See also ==
- List of number-one Billboard Latin Pop Airplay songs of 1995
