= Te Pareces Tanto a Él =

Single by Myriam Hernández

from the album Dos
- Released: 1990
- Recorded: 1990
- Genre: Latin pop · Latin ballad
- Length: 3:47
- Label: Capitol/EMI Latin
- Songwriter: Álvaro Torres
- Producer: Humberto Gatica

Myriam Hernández singles chronology
"Peligroso Amor" (1990)	"Te Pareces Tanto a Él" (1990)	"Herida" (1991)

"Te Pareces Tanto a Él" (English: You Look So Much Like Him) is a ballad written by Salvadoran singer-songwriter Álvaro Torres, produced by Humberto Gatica and performed by Chilean singer-songwriter Myriam Hernández. The song was released as the second single from her second studio album Dos (1990) and became her second number-one single in the Billboard Top Latin Songs chart. Hernández also included the song on her compilation albums Todo lo Mío (1992), Mis Mejores Canciones: 17 Super Éxitos (1993) and Huellas (2004).

The song debuted in the Billboard Top Latin Songs chart (formerly Hot Latin Tracks) at number 36 in the week of 15 December 1990, climbing to the top ten three weeks later, peaking at number one on 16 February 1991, holding this position for four weeks, replacing "Es Demasiado Tarde" by Mexican singer-songwriter Ana Gabriel, and being succeeded at the top by Banda Blanca's "Sopa de Caracol". "Te Pareces Tanto a Él" ended 1991 as the sixth-best-performing single of the year.

== Charts ==
Chart (1990)	Peak position
US Top Latin Songs (Billboard)	1

== See also ==
- List of number-one Billboard Hot Latin Tracks of 1991
