= Peligroso Amor =

Single by Myriam Hernández

from the album Dos
- Released: 1990
- Recorded: 1989–1990
- Genre: Latin pop · Latin ballad
- Length: 4:08
- Label: Capitol/EMI Latin
- Songwriter: Gogo Muñóz
- Producer: Humberto Gatica

Myriam Hernández singles chronology
| "Ay Amor" (1989) | "Peligroso Amor" (1990) | "Te Pareces Tanto a Él" (1990) |

"Peligroso Amor" (English: Dangerous Love) is a ballad written by Gogo Muñoz, produced by Humberto Gatica and performed by Chilean singer-songwriter Myriam Hernández. The song was released as the lead single form her second studio album Dos (1990) and became her first number-one single in the Billboard Top Latin Songs chart. Gogo Muñoz, also wrote Hernández' debut single titled "El Hombre Que Yo Amo", a top ten single in the aforementioned chart in 1989. All the singles released from the album Dos were international hits that spent several weeks at number-one of the rankings in Latin America. This album also marked a record in the Latin Pop Albums in the United States by staying at number-one for 18 consecutive weeks. The music video for the song was produced by Luis De Llano and received a nomination for the Billboard Best Latin Video by a Female Artist. It was nominated in the category of Best Video by a Female Artist in the Latin field.

The song debuted in the Billboard Top Latin Songs chart (formerly Hot Latin Tracks) at number 34 in the week of August 11, 1990, climbing to the top ten three weeks later, peaking at number-one on October 6, 1990, holding this position for two weeks, replacing "Amnesia" by Mexican performer José José, and being succeeded at the top by Chayanne's "Completamente Enamorados".

"Peligroso Amor" was covered by American singer Brenda K. Starr in 1997. Starr also recorded "Herida", the third single from Dos, on her album Te Sigo Esperando, which was awarded with a Platinum album certification in the United States. Hernández included the song on her compilation albums Todo lo Mío (1992), Mis Mejores Canciones: 17 Super Éxitos (1993) and Huellas (2004).

== Charts ==
| Chart (1990) | Peak position |
|---|---|
| US Top Latin Songs (Billboard) | 1 |

== See also ==
- List of number-one Billboard Hot Latin Tracks of 1990
