= III (Myriam Hernández album) =

Studio album by Myriam Hernández
- Released: July 7, 1992
- Recorded: 1991–1992
- Studio: Ocean Way Recording Studios (Los Angeles)
- Genre: Latin pop, Latin ballad
- Label: Warner Elektra Atlantic (WEA) Latina
- Producer: Juan Carlos Calderón

Myriam Hernández chronology
Dos (1990)	III (1992)	IV (1994)

III (Tres), or Myriam Hernández III, is the third studio album by Chilean singer Myriam Hernández. It was released on July 7, 1992, through Warner Elektra Atlantic (WEA) Latina.

== Background ==
This is Hernandez' first record after signing with Warner Elektra Atlantic. The album was produced by Spanish musician Juan Carlos Calderón, a well-known figure in the Spanish-speaking industry at the time because of his work with Mocedades and Luis Miguel ("La Incondicional"). About the creative process for this record, Hernández stated, "I remember that I was working with Juan Carlos in Los Angeles, we worked for about six months. Every day we would meet, and he would play the melodies on the piano, because that's how he composed — he would create the melody on the piano. If I liked it, we would approve it, and then he would write the lyrics based on stories I would tell him". Most of the songs were composed by Calderón, one song was co-written by himself and Hernandez, and Gogo Muñoz provided one song.

In particular, "Se me fue" quickly became one of Hernandez' most memorable songs from the album, due to its strong emotional content. Myriam Hernández recalls that when Calderón played her the melody of the song for the first time, it moved her to tears, after it reminded her of the pain she felt after her grandmother's death. This emotional moment connected them, as Calderón had also experienced the loss of his 18-year-old son. They decided to turn their shared grief into a song, keeping raw, emotional sounds in the recording. Despite concerns about its emotional intensity, they chose to make the song, believing it could help others express their sorrow.

In 2022, Hernandez worked with Juan Carlos Calderon's son, musician Jacobo Calderón, for her album Sinergía. This album includes a previously unreleased composition by Calderón, which was found by Jacobo in a tape among his father's belongings after his death.

== Track listing ==
Side one
No.	Title	Writer(s)	Length
1.	"Un hombre secreto"	Juan Carlos Calderón	3:25
2.	"Si no fueras tú"	Calderón	4:42
3.	"Tu boca"	Calderón	4:03
4.	"Inestabilidad"	Calderón	4:00
5.	"Camino sin camino"	Calderón	3:00
6.	"Yo soy la única"	Gogo Muñoz	4:15

Side two
No.	Title	Writer(s)	Length
7.	"Se me fue"	Calderón	3:35
8.	"Mira"	Myriam Hernandez, Calderón	3:39
9.	"No te quiero como un amigo"	Calderón	3:43
10.	"Decididamente no"	Calderón	3:30
11.	"Camino de la libertad"	Calderón	4:19
12.	"Eres casi mío"	Calderón	3:35

== Personnel ==
Credits adapted from the liner notes of Myriam Hernández III.

- Juan Carlos Calderon – production, music direction, arrangements
- Humberto Gatica – mixing
- Alejandro Rodriguez – mixing (assistant)
- Bernie Grundman – mastering
- Benny Faccone – recording
- Eric Ruod – recording (assistant)
- Mark Guilbeault – recording (assistant)
- Noel Hazen – recording (assistant)
- José Quintana – coordinator
- Cristina Abaroa – coordinator (production assistant), arrangement (track 6)
- Horacio Saavedra – musical assistance (special collaboration)
- George Doering – acoustic guitar
- Paul Jackson Jr. – electric guitar
- Abraham Laboriel – bass
- Harvey Mason - drums (tracks: 1 to 3, 5, 7 to 10)
- John Robinson - drums (tracks: 4, 6)
- Luis Conte – percussion
- Randy Waldman – piano, keyboards
- Dan Higgins – saxophone
- Cartel Diseñadores, Reiner Meric – cover design
- Kenneth Barzilai – photography
- Jorge Saint-Jean – executive producer
- Mauricio Abaroa – executive producer

== Charts ==
Chart (1992)	Peak position
US Latin Pop Albums (Billboard)	23
