= María José Quintanilla =

Chilean singer

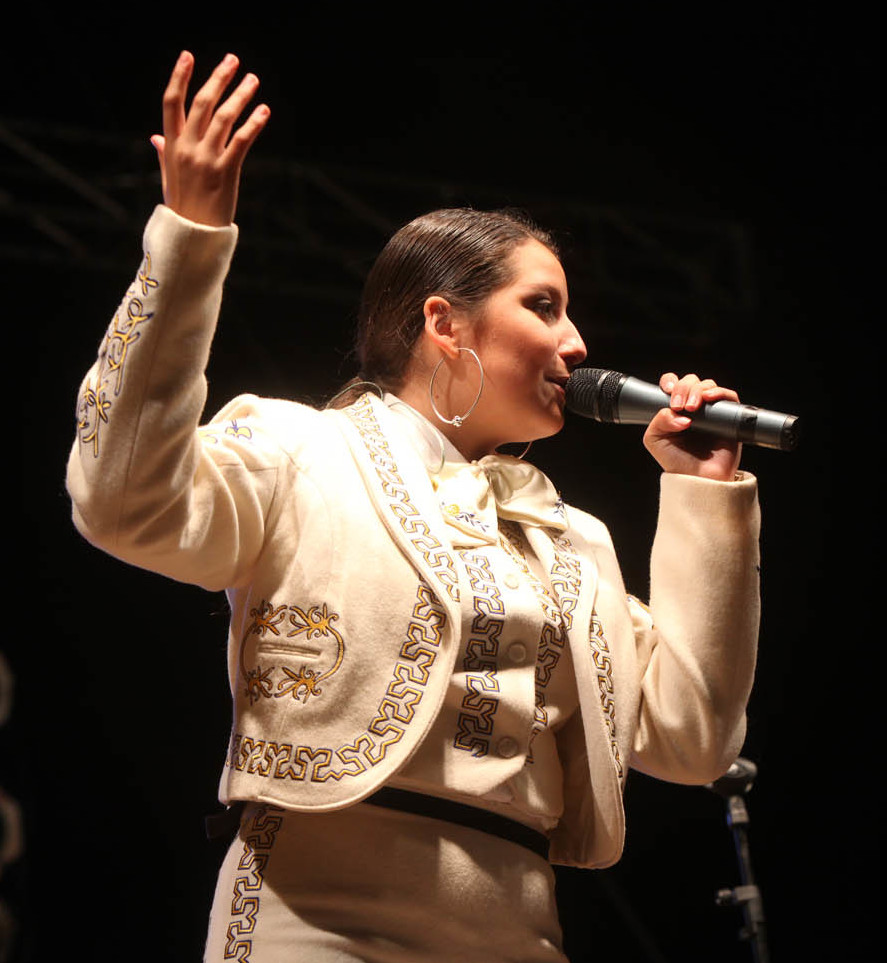
- Quintanilla performing in 2009

Background information
- Born: 17 February 1990 (age 36); Santiago, Chile
- Genres: Ranchera, pop
- Labels: Sony Music Chile; Discos CNR Chile

María José Quintanilla (born 17 February 1990), also nicknamed “Coté”, is a Chilean singer, songwriter, and actress. She began singing as a child and participated in numerous singing contests in her teens. She signed with Sony Music's Chilean label at age 13 and has since recorded eight albums, two of which were certified platinum.

Quintanilla's televised career in the early 2000s is credited for helping Mexican music gain more acceptance in Chile.

== Biography ==
María José Quintanilla was born on 17 February 1990, in Santiago, Chile. She began singing as a child and was a member of Los Maipucitos, a children's folk ensemble which performed in children's music festivals. She began competing in singing contests at age 11. Representing Chile, she was a finalist at the Bravo Bravísimo contest in Modena, Italy, where she sang "Zingara" in both Spanish and Italian. In December 2002 she appeared on the TVN reality television competition Rojo Fama Contrafama.

Quintanilla signed with Sony Music Chile at age 13. Her debut album, México lindo y querido (2003), was certified nine times platinum. Her second album, Canta América (2004), was certified two times platinum.

In 2004, at the age of 14, Quintanilla was a headlining artist at the Viña del Mar International Song Festival, in Chile, performing with a full mariachi band and baile folklórico dancers.

Quintanilla performed in the Broadway musical The Wizard of Oz, and recorded her third album with songs from the production.

== Discography ==
- México Lindo y Querido (2003)
- Canta América (2004)
- Amores (2005)
- Tu corazón (2007)
- Hoja en Blanco (2008)
- Bandolera (2011)
- Apasionada (2012)
- Fue Difícil (2019)
