= Huele a Peligro =

Single by Myriam Hernández

from the album Todo el Amor
- Released: 30 March 1998
- Studio: Andora, L.A., CA; Fonoprint Studio Bologna-Itali; Record Planet, L.A., CA; Simply Audio WestLake, L.A., CA
- Genre: Pop
- Length: 4:57
- Label: Sony Discos
- Songwriter: Armando Manzanero
- Producers: Walter Afanasieff; Humberto Gatica; Myriam Hernández; Celso Valli

Myriam Hernández singles chronology
| "No Hace Falta Más Que Dos" (1995) | "Huele a Peligro" (1998) | "La Fuerza del Amor" (1998) |

"Huele a Peligro" ("I Sense Danger") is a song written by Armando Manzanero and performed by Chilean singer Myriam Hernández. It was released as the lead single from her album, Todo el Amor (1998), her first under Sony Discos having left WEA Latina a year earlier. The song was released to radio stations on 30 March 1998 while its music video premiered the following day. Mark Holston of America magazine called it a "poignant pop ballad". It was recognized as one of the best-performing Latin songs of the year at the 1999 BMI Latin Awards. "Huele a Peligro" was covered by Puerto Rican merengue singer Gisselle on her album, Atada (1998). Gisselle's version peaked at number nine and two on the Billboard Hot Latin Songs and Tropical Airplay charts, respectively.

== Charts ==
=== Weekly charts ===
Weekly chart positions for "Huele a Peligro"
| Chart (1998) | Peak position |
|---|---|
| US Hot Latin Songs (Billboard) | 5 |
| US Latin Pop Airplay (Billboard) | 1 |

=== Year-end charts ===
1998 year-end chart performance for "Huele a Peligro"
| Chart (1998) | Position |
|---|---|
| US Latin Pop Airplay (Billboard) | 14 |

== See also ==
- List of Billboard Latin Pop Airplay number ones of 1998
