= Frédéric Gassita =

Gabonese musician

- Born: Gabon
- Education: Conservatoire de Châteauroux; Berklee College of Music
- Occupations: Pianist; composer; record producer; television producer
- Musical career
- Genre: Jazz
- Instrument: Piano
- Labels: Afro Jazz Productions; Atlantide Music
- Website: afjproductions2020.com

Frédéric Gassita is a Gabonese pianist, composer and record producer best known for his musical work combining jazz, classical music and African music. He was the third African student admitted to Berklee College of Music and the first Gabonese. Gassita is a founding member and president of the African Music Institute in Libreville.

== Early life and education ==
Gassita attended the Conservatoire de Châteauroux in France in the early 1980s, where he received classical training. Upon returning to Gabon in 1984, he formed a band and started playing at a club in Libreville. An audience member he met during a performance told him about Berklee College of Music. In 1987, two years into medicine school, he moved to Boston and joined Berklee in the fall of 1988. Gassita studied music production, sound engineering and jazz performance.

During his time at Berklee, Gassita developed an interest in orchestration. He attended the rehearsals of the Berklee Contemporary Symphony Orchestra and studied literature on orchestration.

== Career ==
=== Orchestral work ===
Gassita has recorded six orchestral music albums. The double album “Frédéric Gassita With The Royal Philharmonic Orchestra” includes pieces from his opuses released between 2004 and 2008, which were rearranged for the new release. “Symphonic Visions From Gabon”, featuring the London Symphony Orchestra, also a double album, incorporates African music influences.

Production of the albums began in Gassita's studio in Libreville, alongside French conductor Paul Rouger and Ali Bongo Ondimba, President of Gabon and also a composer. Gassita met Ondimba during a party where they played piano four hands. The albums were recorded at Air Studios' Lyndhurst Hall in London. The sessions were engineered by Pascal Bomy. Guest artists included Bireli Lagrène, André Ceccarelli, Baptiste Herbin and Sylvain Luc.

In 2020, Gassita the double album "New Symphonic Visions from Gabon with the London Symphony Orchestra Bantu Jazz Vol. 1 & 2".

=== African Music Institute ===
According to Berklee College of Music, their relationship with Gabon began with Gassita, whose goal was to provide similar music education in Africa.

In October 2015, Roger H. Brown, president of Berklee College of Music and Ali Bongo Ondimba, president of Gabon, signed a memorandum of understanding to create a pan-African music school in Libreville. Gassita was among the signees and is currently the president of the African Music Institute Foundation.

=== Television ===
Gassita directed the television series "The Mytho", which was produced by his company, Afro Jazz Productions. The series consists of 20 episodes and aired during the second half of 2015.

=== Sports ===
Gassita founded and is the president of the first division football team FC Sapins, later renamed to Akanda FC. Gassita also played as a striker for the team and was the Gabonese league's top scorer. Akanda FC is considered the strongest football club in Gabon. The team also has the highest budget.

== Discography ==
- Forever Yours (2004)
- Following My Star (2008)
- Frédéric Gassita with the Royal Philharmonic Orchestra, Vol. 1 (2013)
- Frédéric Gassita with the Royal Philharmonic Orchestra, Vol. 2 (2013)
- Symphonic Visions from Gabon (2013)
- Symphonic Visions from Gabon with the London Symphony Orchestra (2013)
- My Experience (2015)
- New Symphonic Visions from Gabon with the London Symphony Orchestra Bantu Jazz Vol. 1 & 2 (2020)
