= El hombre que yo amo =

Single by Myriam Hernández

from the album Myriam Hernández
- Language: Spanish
- Released: 1988
- Genre: Latin ballad
- Length: 3:31
- Label: EMI Odeon Chilena; Capitol/EMI Latin
- Songwriter: Gogo Muñoz
- Producer: Juan Carlos Duque

Myriam Hernández singles chronology
"Ay amor" (1988)	"El hombre que yo amo" (1988)	"Quiero saber" (1988)

Music video
- "El hombre que yo amo" on YouTube

"El hombre que yo amo" (Spanish: [el ˈombɾe ˈke ˈʝo ˈamo], lit. 'The man I love') is a song by Chilean singer Myriam Hernández, written by Argentine musician Gogo Muñoz. The song was released in 1988 through EMI Odeon Chilena, as the second single from her self-titled debut album.

Described as one of the most emblematic songs of Chilean música romántica, it became Hernandez' breakthrough hit single, which launched her career internationally.

== Background ==
Hernández had several meetings with the author, Gogo Muñoz, to convey what she wanted to express through the track and the style she wanted to be identified with, so he could come up with lyrics accordingly. Hernandez' record label wanted her to record a song with an aggressive tone and more resentful towards men, a common theme in Latin pop songs by female artists in the late 1980s. However, Hernandez refused, insisting that an aggressive style was not the approach she wanted. When she finally was presented with Muñoz's work, she was pleased, as it was exactly what she wanted to project. Hernandez described the lyrics of "El hombre que yo amo" as "an ode to men, and that utopia we women have of falling in love [...] with a sort of prince charming, at a time when there were many songs that did not treat men very well".

During the mid-2010s, Hernandez decided to change a line in the song's lyrics when performing it live, as she began feeling uncomfortable with it for being "too submissive". Regarding this, Hernandez stated: "Although it's true that I like to treat [men] well, I believe a romantic relationship should be based on conversation and mutual respect". The line in question is "Vuela siempre lejos, pero vuelve al nido" (He always flies away, but [then] returns to the nest), for which she reformulated its conjugation, from referring to the man being the one who leaves and then returns, to herself being the one who does so ("Vuelo siempre lejos, pero vuelvo al nido"). Hernandez justified the change to the lyrics by stating "I do not forgive a man who leaves and then comes back. I am not submissive, on the contrary [...] [and] I don't want to send that message to the women who come to my concerts".

== Music video ==
The music video for "El hombre que yo amo" was directed by Eduardo Domínguez and filmed in the sand dunes of Concón in the Valparaíso Region. The video had a minimalist approach and had a budget between 200 and 300 thousand Chilean pesos at the time. Domínguez came up with the idea of the shooting location, while the wardrobe and the use of the chair were Hernández' ideas.

== Chart performance ==
"El hombre que yo amo" peaked at number 10 on the US Billboard Hot Latin Songs chart, and charted for 21 weeks. In Chile, the song peaked at number nine.

== Legacy and impact ==
The Chilean Association of Musical Authors and Performers (SCD) recognized "El hombre que yo amo" as the second highest-grossing Chilean song in terms of royalties, after "Herida", which is also a song by Hernandez.

In 2023, the song surpassed 100 million streams on Spotify, becoming the most listened song from the 1980s by a Chilean artist on this streaming platform, followed by "El baile de los que sobran" by Los Prisioneros with 55 million streams.

The song has been covered by Tormenta, Yolanda Pérez, Choco Orta, Zayda, André Hazes, and Karol G, among others.

== Charts ==
Weekly chart performance for "El hombre que yo amo"
Chart (1990)	Peak position
US Hot Latin Songs (Billboard)	10
