= Lo Mejor (Myriam Hernández album) =

Compilation album by Myriam Hernández
- Released: 1997
- Genre: Latin pop, Latin ballad
- Label: Warner Music Chile; Warner Elektra Atlantic (WEA) Latina

Myriam Hernández chronology
Éxitos y recuerdos (1995)	Lo Mejor (1997)	Simplemente Humana (1998)

Lo Mejor is a compilation album by Chilean singer Myriam Hernández, released in 1997 through Warner Music Chile.

== Background ==
Lo Mejor is Hernandez' only compilation album released during her time under WEA Latina. It is also her last record release under this label, following the termination of her contract by mutual agreement. The album compiles songs from Hernandez's two studio albums released under Warner. A remarkable feature of this record is that it is the only album by Hernandez that includes the duet she made with Paul Anka for “Tu cabeza en mi hombro” ("Put Your Head on My Shoulder"), which was first included in Anka's album Amigos released in 1996.

== Track listing ==
CD
No.	Title	Writer(s)	Length
1.	"Tu cabeza en mi hombro" (duet with Paul Anka)	Paul Anka (Spanish lyrics: Paz Martínez)	4:56
2.	"Se me fue"	Juan Carlos Calderón	3:35
3.	"Tu boca"	Calderón	4:03
4.	"No hace falta más que dos"	Juan Carlos Duque, Myriam Hernández	4:03
5.	"Ese hombre"	María Angélica Ramírez	3:25
6.	"Lloraré"	Myriam & Jaime Hernández	3:39
7.	"Sentimental"	Albert Hammond, Marti Sharron	3:35
8.	"Mira"	Hernandez, Calderón	3:39
9.	"Lo mejor que me ha pasado"	Scottie Scott	3:43
10.	"Un hombre secreto"	Calderón	3:25
11.	"Yo soy la única"	Gogo Muñoz	4:15
12.	"Si no fueras tú"	Calderón	4:42
