= Amorfoda =

Single by Bad Bunny
- Language: Spanish
- English title: "Fuck Love" (Note: "Amorfoda" is a Portuguese term that loosely translates to "fuck love", "fucked love" or "love fucked".)
- Released: February 14, 2018
- Genre: Pop ballad
- Length: 2:33
- Label: Rimas
- Songwriters: Benito Martínez; Noah Assad; Luian Malave; Edgar Semper-Vargas; Xavier Semper-Vargas
- Producers: DJ Luian; Mambo Kingz

Bad Bunny singles chronology
"Tocate Tu Misma" (2018)	"Amorfoda" (2018)	"Dime Si Te Acuerdas" (2018)

Music video
- "Amorfoda" on YouTube

"Amorfoda" (transl. "Fuck Love") is a song by Puerto Rican rapper and singer Bad Bunny. It was released as a single by Rimas Entertainment on February 14, 2018. Bad Bunny co-wrote the song with Noah Assad, and its producers DJ Luian and Mambo Kingz. Departing from Bad Bunny's original Latin trap and reggaeton sound, "Amorfoda" is a piano ballad about regret in a relationship gone awry. The singer said it is about "something almost everyone has experienced. Everyone has been in love". Its title translates to "Fuck Love".

== Background ==
Bad Bunny wrote "Amorfoda" a long time before his rise to fame. In an interview for Billboard, he said: "I've always loved this song because I wrote it with a lot of sentiment behind it. It's the kind of record that reminds me of the longevity of really good songs. A good song never gets old. It was just a matter of time, and it was time to come out with something different." The track's title arose when the singer was searching for a term in Portuguese to send love to hell.

== Charts ==
=== Weekly charts ===
Chart (2017–2018)	Peak position
Bolivia (Monitor Latino)	9
Colombia (Monitor Latino)	18
Netherlands (Global Top 40)	10
Spain (Promusicae)	1
US Hot Latin Songs (Billboard)	10

=== Year-end charts ===
Chart (2018)	Position
US Hot Latin Songs (Billboard)	31

== Certifications ==
Region	Certification	Certified units/sales
Spain (Promusicae)	4× Platinum	400,000^{‡}
United States (RIAA)	5× Platinum (Latin)	300,000^{‡}
^{‡} Sales+streaming figures based on certification alone.
