= Los Nocheros =

Argentinian pop-folk music group

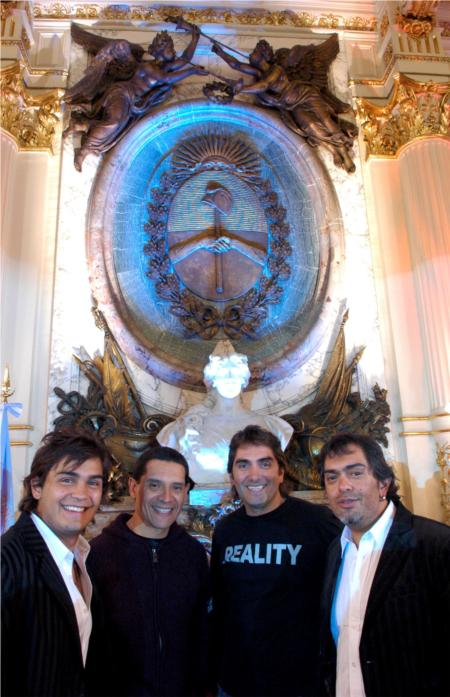
Los Nocheros

Los Nocheros is a pop-folk music group from Salta, Argentina. Composed of Mario Teruel, Rubén Ehizaguirre, Kike Teruel and Álvaro Teruel (who replaced Jorge Rojas when the latter pursued a solo career in 2005), their 1994 debut album was titled Con El Alma. Los Nocheros gained fame during appearances at the National Folklore Festival in Cosquín, Córdoba. Receiving numerous local awards, they were nominated for a Best Folk Album award at the Latin Grammy Awards of 2005. Their album sales have totaled around 2,000,000 in Argentina alone. Among the 21 albums the group has released as of 2009, Signos (1998) and Señal de Amor (2001) have been the most successful, with 500,000 and 250,000 sales, each.
