= Herida =

1991 latin pop single by Myriam Hernández

Single by Myriam Hernández

from the album Dos
- Released: April 20, 1991
- Genre: Latin pop
- Length: 4:01
- Label: EMI Latin
- Songwriter: Myriam Hernández
- Producer: Humberto Gatica

Myriam Hernandez singles chronology
"Te Pareces Tanto a Él" (1990)	"Herida" (1990)	"Eres" (1990)

"Herida" ("Wounded") is a song originally recorded by Chilean singer Myriam Hernández as the third single from her second studio album, Dos (1990). The song reached number three on the Billboard Hot Latin Tracks chart in 1991.

It was covered by American singer Brenda K. Starr as the lead single for Starr's fourth studio album, Te Sigo Esperando (1997). Starr's version of the song peaked at number twenty-eight on the Billboard Hot Latin Tracks chart, number fourteen on the Billboard Latin Pop Tracks chart and at number one on the Billboard Tropical/Salsa Tracks chart, leading the latter chart for two weeks in April 1997. It was the eighth best-performing Tropical/Salsa Track of 1997.

== Commercial performance ==
On the Billboard Hot Latin Tracks chart, the song debuted at number thirty-three for the week of April 27, 1991. It peaked at number three for the week of June 8, 1991, being held from the top position by Los Bukis' "Mi Deseo" and Emmanuel's "No He Podido Verte," respectively.

== Charts ==
=== Weekly charts ===
Chart (1991)	Peak Position
Chile (UPI)	8
Peru (UPI)	4
US Hot Latin Tracks (Billboard)	3

=== Year-end charts ===
Chart (1991)	Position
US Hot Latin Tracks (Billboard)	40

== Brenda K. Starr version ==
"Herida"

Single by Brenda K. Starr

from the album Te Sigo Esperando
- Released: February 8, 1997
- Genre: Salsa
- Length: 4:54
- Label: Parcha
- Songwriter: Myriam Hernandez
- Producer: Humberto Ramirez

Brenda K. Starr singles chronology
"Only Love" (1996)	"Herida" (1997)	"Si Me Preguntan Por Ti" (1997)

=== Background and recording ===
Recording for the album began after a label executive suggested that Starr record salsa music, as she had previously only recorded in the freestyle, pop and dance genres. While recording the song, Starr had problems with the pronunciation of certain words due to her inability to speak fluent Spanish.

=== Commercial performance ===
On the Billboard Hot Latin Tracks chart, the song debuted at number thirty-four for the week of March 29, 1997. It peaked at number twenty-eight for the week of May 3, 1997. On the Billboard Latin Pop Tracks chart, the song debuted at number seventeen for the week of March 29, 1997. It peaked at number fourteen for the week of April 19, 1997. On the Billboard Tropical/Salsa Tracks chart, the song debuted at number sixteen for the week of February 15, 1997. Ten weeks later, for the week of April 19, 1997, the song reached the top of the chart, replacing Gilberto Santa Rosa's "Yo No Te Pido." It spent an additional week at number-one, for the week of April 26, 1997, before being succeeded by Frankie Negron's "Inolvidable."

=== Charts ===
==== Weekly charts ====
Chart (1997)	Peak Position
US Hot Latin Tracks (Billboard)	28
US Latin Pop Tracks (Billboard)	14
US Tropical/Salsa Tracks (Billboard)	1

==== Year-end charts ====
Chart (1997)	Position
US Tropical/Salsa Tracks (Billboard)	8

== See also ==
- List of Billboard Tropical Airplay number ones of 1997
