= Sony Music Chile =

Sony Music Entertainment Chile S.A.
- Formerly: CBS Records Chile Ltda. (1981–1991); Sony Music Entertainment Chile Ltda. (1991–2005); Sony BMG Music Entertainment Chile S.A. (2005–2009)
- Company type: Subsidiary
- Industry: Music
- Genre: Record label
- Founded: 1981; 45 years ago
- Headquarters: Presidente Riesco 5435, Las Condes, Santiago, Chile
- Key people: Arturo Valverde (Country Manager)
- Parent: Sony Music Entertainment
- Website: sonymusic.cl

Sony Music Entertainment Chile S.A., commonly known as Sony Music Chile, is the Chilean subsidiary of Sony Music, which emerged following the rebrand of CBS Records Chile in 1990.

The label has no direct affiliation with the Sony Music Latin label based in the US.

== Background ==
Since its inception, Sony Music Chile has been one of the main multinational record labels operating in Chile, along with Warner Music and Universal. They also operate in Bolivia.

During the 1990s, amid a growing local rock scene, the growing popularity of radio stations such as Rock & Pop and other emerging media outlets, Sony Music Chile made efforts develop the local Chilean music scene, of which the most notable was the a strategic alliance they made with independent label Alerce in 1995. This alliance involved Sony handling distribution and marketing for Alerce emerging artists, while Alerce retained artistic control. Sony's investment in these efforts was reported as substantial, with contemporary press noting it exceeded the budget for promoting Michael Jackson's HIStory album. As part of its strategy, Sony Music Chile established a subsidiary label called Kráter in the mid-to-late 1990s to develop additional local rock catalogs, complementing its own roster and the Alerce partnership. Their most important artist during this decade was Los Tres. They signed them in 1993, and the label invested significantly in them in order to expand their career throughout Latin America, in an attempt to replicate the trajectory of La Ley supported by Warner Music Chile. The alliance with Alerce dissolved by the end of the 1990s, influenced by lower-than-expected album sales, piracy, and the rise of the internet, contributing to a broader retreat of multinational labels from intensive local development.

During the 2000s, the Chilean music industry faced one of the worst sales declines of the decade, with an overall disc sales drop amid widespread piracy and changing consumption habits since the late 1990s. During this period, the label's most profitable artist was María José Quintanilla, with reported sales of over 200,000 copies.

In 2006, the label—along with EMI, Warner, and Universal—formed the Association of Phonographic and Videographic Producers of Chile (PROFOVI), which collects royalties from commercial establishments that use music, covering not only public performance rights but also reproduction or storage rights.

In the early 2010s, the label shifted away from developing local artists or projects, citing declining physical sales and a focus on larger international markets. However, by the end of the decade, shifted its focus and began placing significant emphasis on the growing local urban music scene, signing and promoting several emerging Chilean artists in genres such as trap, reggaeton, and urban pop. This strategic focus aligned with the broader regional and global rise of Latin urban sounds, allowing the label to capitalize on the increasing popularity of these styles among younger audiences in Chile and beyond, and to integrate local talent into wider streaming and digital platforms. During this period, they signed several urban artists, including Paloma Mami, Young Cister, Galee Galee, and Polimá Westcoast.

In 2018, Paloma Mami became the first Chilean artist to be signed with the US-based label Sony Music Latin. Subsequently, other Sony Music Chile acts, such as Polimá Westcoast, followed this same path.

== Artists ==
=== Current ===
- Américo
- Princesa Alba
- Young Cister
- Polimá Westcoast
- Louki
- Nyruz
- Martinwhite
- Paloma Mami

=== Former ===
- Eva Ayllón
- Pedro Aznar
- Azul Azul
- Los Bandoleros de Teno
- Mariana Bfly
- Los Bunkers
- Catiusca
- Chancho en Piedra
- Douglas
- Giovanni Falchetti
- La Frecuencia Rebelde
- Furia Fobia
- Go
- Galee Galee
- Hechizo
- Myriam Hernández
- Pablo Herrera
- Los Jaivas
- Luis Jara
- Sergio Járlaz
- Javiera y Los Imposibles
- Makiza
- Javiera Mena
- Bárbara Muñoz
- Octavia
- Katherine Orellana
- Luis Pedraza
- María José Quintanilla
- Raiza
- Camila Silva
- Stereo 3
- Supernova
- Los Tetas
- Tiro de Gracia
- Los Tres
- Francisca Valenzuela
