= Jacobo Calderón =

Spanish composer, producer and arranger

Jacobo Calderón Fernández (born 18 May 1974 in Madrid) is a Spanish composer, producer and arranger. He has produced and composed 60 albums that have sold 9 million copies worldwide. His songs have been performed by Raphael, David Bisbal, Abraham Mateo, Sergio Dalma, Álex Ubago, Tamara, Pastora Soler, Manuel Mijares and other singers. As a producer he has worked with Luis Fonsi, Alejandro Sanz, Paul Anka, Charles Aznavour, Vicente Fernández, Joan Manuel Serrat, Joaquín Sabina, María Dolores Pradera, Francisco Céspedes, Laura Pausini, Ricardo Montaner, Miley Cyrus and Alejandro Fernández. He has been nominated for a Grammy Award and a Latin Grammy. His father Juan Carlos Calderón was composer and music producer.

== Career ==
At the age of eight he began studying music theory and piano at the Katarina Gurska music academy in Madrid. He continued his studies with the Argentinian maestro Carlos Cítera and completed them by specialising in arranging and modern composition at the Escuela de Música Creativa in Madrid. At the age of 20 he moved to Miami where he studied music industry related studies at the University of Miami.

His first recording took place at the age of 18, when he composed the song "La duda" for the album Encadenado by Mexican singer Manuel Mijares. A year later he collaborated with his father Juan Carlos Calderón in the production and arrangements of the album of duets Nino Bravo: 50 Aniversario, which sold more than 900,000 copies. The success of the album generated another album by the same singer, Duetos 2, as well as other albums of duets featuring the singer-songwriter Cecilia (Desde que tú te has ido) and José Alfredo Jiménez, helping his father in the production and arrangements. In 1997 he produced and arranged album Mocedades canta a Walt Disney by the group Mocedades.

After these first works, in the early 2000s he produced the albums Cuarto creciente by Maldita Nerea, Ya no es ayer by Raúl, which sold more than 100,000 copies, Bravo Francisco by Francisco in tribute to Nino Bravo, as well as the song "Como hablar", with the participation of Amaral, for the album Escapadas by Antonio Vega.

In the 2020s, he began working with Chilean singer Myriam Hernández, and has currently produced three studio albums for her.
