= Humberto Gatica =

Chilean-born American record producer (born 1951)

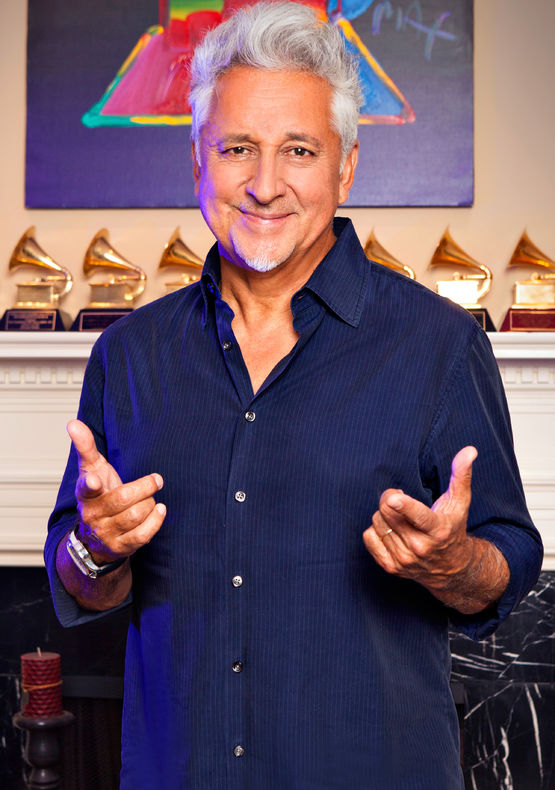
- Gatica in 2016

Background information
- Born: Humberto Hernán Gatica Órdenes; 18 March 1951 (age 75); Rancagua, O'Higgins Region, Chile
- Genres: Pop; rock; Latin; R&B; jazz
- Occupations: Music; producer; music mixer
- Years active: 1973–present

Humberto Hernán Gatica Órdenes is a Chilean and American recording engineer, mixing engineer and record producer, best known for his work with Celine Dion, Chicago, Michael Jackson, Barbra Streisand, Andrea Bocelli, Josh Groban, Cher and Michael Bublé. Gatica's international collaborations include producing artists singing in over six languages.

Gatica's career is highlighted by humanitarian projects including We Are the World, We Are The World 25 for Haiti, Hands Across America and Voces Unidas Por Chile. He has received 17 Grammy Awards and 24 nominations.

== Early life and career ==
Humberto Hernán Gatica Órdenes was born in Rancagua, Chile in a musical family. His grandparents owned a bar in Rancagua where they played the piano and the harp. His uncles Arturo, Orlando, María and Lucho Gatica were singers. Lucho Gatica is widely known in Latin America as the “King of Bolero”.

At age 9, Gatica's father died of an illness and his mother had to travel to the United States to look for employment. He moved in with his grandmother. Passionate about music, he taught himself to play the guitar at age 13. He describes that he particularly liked how the bathroom at his grandmother's house resonated when he played the guitar.

At age 16, after the death of his grandmother, Gatica decided to leave Chile. His Aunt Yolanda gave him the equivalent of 20 dollars. He gathered enough money to fly to Mexico City and then took a bus to Los Angeles. He reunited with his mother and younger brother and started working at a warehouse during the day and in a parking lot at night.

Four years later, in 1972, while Lucho Gatica was in Los Angeles, he called his nephew Humberto asking him to meet at the Beverly Hilton Hotel. Lucho Gatica asked Humberto to take him to MGM Recording Studio. Two months later, Humberto was invited to a recording session with Sammy Davis Jr., an artist he used to listen to with his grandmother in Rancagua. Gatica describes this experience:

“From that moment on I was completely in love with the whole world of recording. The studio manager allowed me to become an intern and I did everything from cleaning to changing lightbulbs”.

— Humberto Gatica

Gatica gradually became an assistant engineer at MGM. In 1973, the recording engineer for a session with producer Don Costa was ill. Too late to cancel the session, Costa decided to “take his chances with the kid” and gave Gatica the opportunity of engineering the big band session with 40 people. He continued engineering for Costa afterwards.

When MGM Recording Studio was sold a year later, Gatica was laid off. He became a freelance engineer and started working with producers David Foster and Quincy Jones alongside engineer Bruce Swedien. Gatica was once spotted at Sunset Sound studios in Hollywood engineering three sessions at the same time for Kenny Rogers, Kenny Loggins and Chicago.

In 1974, Gatica engineered the album “Elis & Tom” by Antônio Carlos Jobim and Elis Regina. His work with Brazilian artists also includes Djavan's “A Voz, O Violão, A Música de Djavan” and “Lilas” albums, Paulinho Da Costa's “Agora”, Gilberto Gil's “Realce” and “Luar (A Gente Precisa Ver o Luar)” and Simone's “La Distancia”.

Gatica started collaborating with producer David Foster in the late 70s. Spanning over 25 years, they produced multi-platinum albums and singles including Chicago's Chicago 17 album, Celine Dion's “My Heart Will Go On”, Josh Groban's “Noël”, Michael Bublé's “Crazy Love” and Andrea Bocelli's “The Prayer”. Foster describes his workflow with Gatica in an interview from 1984:

“Hum is becoming a co-producer. It’s not even that he learned it from me; we’ve learned from each other. (…) When Hum’s in the studio with me, he’s working with me, not for me. As I’m about to reach to turn up the vocals just a little bit more, he does it. Or about to turn up the Rhodes a little bit more in the (head)phones because the singer is singing a little out of tune, he does it… with no communications”.

— David Foster

Gatica shares his point of view:

“I have been absorbing the way David produces. I admire what he does, so it is easy for me to put my feelings into the creative circumstance.”

— Humberto Gatica

In 1985, he won his first Grammy Award for Best Engineered Recording – Non Classical for Chicago's album 17. He was the recording engineer for Michael Jackson's albums Thriller and Bad. Gatica won his second Grammy Award for Bad, also in the category of Best Engineered Recording – Non Classical.

In 2013, Gatica, along with KC Porter, produced Lucho Gatica's “Historia de un Amor”. It was the last album that Lucho Gatica recorded. Gatica commissioned Jorge Calandrelli with the arrangements. Together, they chose the guest performer for each song. The album consists of duets performing Latin-American standards and features artists Laura Pausini, Nelly Furtado, Il Volo, Michael Bublé, Lucero, Luis Fonsi, Miguel Bosé, among others.

In recent years, Gatica has focused on producing projects that highlight vocal performance. Gatica describes these as “artists who perform melodies that really make you feel”. Gatica was a judge at the Viña del Mar International Song Festival in 2000, 2005 and 2019.

In 2019, Gatica, along with Frédéric Gassita, produced Nigerian singer Timi Dakolo's “Merry Christmas Darling”. The album featured Emeli Sandé, Kenny G, Eric Benét and The Eben Voices of Gabon Choir. Co-executively produced by Ali Bongo Ondimba and Efe Ogbeni, the album was recorded at Abbey Road Studios in London, Capitol Studios in Los Angeles and additional studios in Libreville, Budapest and Lagos.

During the ongoing coronavirus pandemic, Gatica has worked on Groban's upcoming album “Harmony”, set to be released in November 2020. The album includes standards like “The First Time Ever I Saw Your Face” and “She”. Groban describes the album as evoking “a feeling of hope, a feeling of togetherness”.

== Humanitarian collaborations ==
Gatica's work as producer and engineer on humanitarian projects includes “We Are The World”, “We Are The World 25 for Haiti”, “Hands Across America”, “Hermanos”, “Voices That Care” and “Voces Unidas Por Chile”.

Gatica recorded the supergroup USA for Africa for “We Are The World”, produced by Quincy Jones and Michael Omartian. It sold over 7 million records worldwide and raised 60 million dollars, destined to feed people affected by the famine in Ethiopia from 1983 to 1985.

Gatica recorded “Voices That Care”, featuring artists including Meryl Streep, Kevin Costner, Garth Brooks, Julio Iglesias and The Beach Boys, produced by David Foster. The song was meant as an apolitical anthem to boost the morale of military personnel deployed during the Gulf crisis of 1991 and offer their families emotional support.

A 25th anniversary re-recording of “We Are The World” was being planned when a magnitude 7.0 earthquake devastated Haiti. The aim of the project shifted to fundraising efforts to assist the survivors. “We Are The World 25 for Haiti”, also produced by Quincy Jones, was recorded by Gatica featuring over 50 artists including Tony Bennett, Justin Bieber, T-Pain, Will.I.Am and Wyclef Jean. It debuted during the Winter Olympics in Vancouver.

The same year, on February 27, a magnitude 8.8 earthquake struck Gatica's native Chile. Supported by the National Council for Culture and Arts (Consejo nacional de la Cultura y las Artes, CNCA), Gatica produced the song “Gracias a la Vida” (Thanks To Life), recorded by supergroup “Voces Unidas por Chile” (United Voices for Chile). Featured artists included Beto Cuevas, Juanes, Alejandro Sanz, Juan Luis Guerra, Laura Pausini, Fher, Shakira, Michael Bublé and Miguel Bosé. The song was released digitally in a fundraising effort for the survivors. Besides fundraising, Gatica's goal was to leave a legacy for the Chilean youth and inspire others to help through the arts.

In 2018, Gatica produced Brazilian singer Greice Santo's single “Você Você” which speaks against sexual harassment. She wrote the song inspired by women in the #MeToo movement.

== Style ==
Gatica explains that his focus when producing is arrangement and performance:

“After the sound (…) is set, I let go and completely disconnect myself from that aspect. After that, all I think about is the creative aspect, the feel, the arrangement, what the arrangement is doing to the melody, how it is affecting the vocal performance”.

— Humberto Gatica

In an interview in 1981, Gatica explains his role as an engineer when working with another producer. After analyzing a few instructions given by the producer, Gatica understands what his creative goal is. He makes sure the producer is pleased but he also goes beyond the technical role.

Gatica describes his mixes in a visual way. When mixing his first record for Michael Jackson, Jackson said to Gatica: “great, you work in colors”. “It’s my life”, Gatica replied. He describes the instruments in a mix in terms of a three-dimensional space:

“Parts require a height, width and depth in order to take on a living quality. The longer the effect like echo, delay and reverb, the farther back the part goes. Height is controlled by the range of frequencies from low to high and width by the panning spread”.

— Humberto Gatica

Gatica points out that he is often concerned about clarity in his records.[3] When mixing, he starts with the lead vocal:

“The first thing I do (…) is work on the vocal. Everything has to sound good around the vocal. When I’ve gotten the vocal to sound right and the foundation is there, the mix becomes more fun and there is room to be creative and expressive (…).”

— Humberto Gatica

He lists the kick drum, the snare drum and the bass as the foundation of a mix. According to Gatica, these elements are responsible for the first impression on the listener.

When recording brass instruments, Gatica places the players in a “U” shape instead of having them stand side by side, as they normally do when playing live. He then positions individual microphones for the saxophones and trombones, as well as a single microphone for each of the trumpets. An additional microphone hung about 9 feet high the middle captures all the horns and adds “fullness the sound” according to Gatica. He used this same setup when recording brass with Chicago's 16. Because the band's brass section consists of only one trumpet, one saxophone and a trombone, four microphones were used in total: one for each instrument plus the additional microphone in the center.

Gatica works with a hybrid system combining digital recording and analog signal processing. He points out that he prefers analog processors especially when working with artists like Celine Dion, Andrea Bocelli, Josh Groban and Michael Bublé.

== Awards ==
Gatica has won 17 Grammy and Latin Grammy Awards. In 2007, Humberto Gatica was with his uncle Lucho Gatica on stage when the latter received the Lifetime Achievement Award at the 8th Latin Grammys. 8 years later, at the 16th Latin Grammys, Humberto Gatica received the Trustees Award. The award was presented by Celine Dion and Neil Portnow. On stage, Dion described Gatica's work with her starting at her first recording session in English:

“He has (been) able to go beyond technology and practice magic. It’s a special talent, it’s generosity, a bit of magic, a lot of love and friendship. I honestly think that Humberto has been singing with me through all those years”.

— Celine Dion

=== Grammy Awards ===
Year	Title	Artist	Category	Role	Result
1985	Hard Habit To Break	Chicago	Record Of The Year	Engineer, mixer	Nominated
1985	17	Chicago	Best Engineered Recording – Non Classical	Engineer, mixer	Won
1986	We Are The World	USA For Africa, Various Artists	Album Of The Year	Engineer, mixer	Nominated
1987	David Foster	David Foster	Best Engineered Recording – Non Classical	Producer, engineer, mixer	Nominated
1988	Bad	Michael Jackson	Best Engineered Recording – Non Classical	Engineer	Won
1997	Falling Into You	Celine Dion	Album Of The Year	Producer, engineer	Won
1997	Falling Into You	Celine Dion	Best Pop Album	Producer, engineer	Won
1998	The Day	Babyface	Best Engineered Recording – Non Classical	Engineer	Nominated
1999	My Heart Will Go On (Love Theme from Titanic)	Celine Dion	Record Of The Year	Producer, engineer, mixer	Won
1999	Let's Talk About Love	Celine Dion	Best Pop Album	Producer, engineer, mixer	Nominated
2001	Uno	La Ley	Best Latin Rock/Alternative Album	Producer, engineer, Mixer	Won
2006	It's Time	Michael Bublé	Best Traditional Pop Vocal Album	Producer, engineer, Mixer	Nominated
2007	Caught In The Act	Michael Bublé	Best Traditional Pop Vocal Album	Producer, engineer, Mixer	Nominated
2008	Call Me Irresponsible	Michael Bublé	Best Traditional Pop Vocal Album	Producer, engineer, mixer	Won
2009	Noël	Josh Groban	Best Traditional Pop Vocal Album	Producer, engineer, mixer	Nominated
2010	Michael Bublé Meets Madison Square Garden	Michael Bublé	Best Traditional Pop Vocal Album	Producer, mixer	Won
2011	Crazy Love	Michael Bublé	Best Traditional Pop Vocal Album	Producer, engineer, mixer	Won
2016	Stages	Josh Groban	Best Traditional Pop Vocal Album	Producer, engineer, mixer	Nominated
2017	Stages Live	Josh Groban	Best Traditional Pop Vocal Album	Producer, engineer, mixer	Nominated
2017	Cinema	Andrea Bocelli	Best Traditional Pop Vocal Album	Producer, engineer	Nominated
2018	Nobody But Me (Deluxe Version)	Michael Bublé	Best Traditional Pop Vocal Album	Engineer	Nominated

=== Latin Grammy Awards ===
Year	Title	Artist	Category	Role	Result
2002	Yo Por Ti	Olga Tañón	Best Merengue Album	Producer, mixer	Won
2002	MTV Unplugged	La Ley	Best Rock Album By A Duo Or Group With Vocal	Producer, engineer	Won
2002	Mentira	La Ley	Record Of The Year	Producer, engineer	Nominated
2002	MTV Unplugged	Alejandro Sanz	Album Of The Year	Producer, engineer, mixer	Won
2002	Y Solo Se Me Ocurre Amarte	Alejandro Sanz	Record Of The Year	Producer, engineer, mixer	Won
2002	N/A	N/A	Producer Of The Year	Producer	Nominated
2004	Ámate y Sálvate	La Ley	Best Rock Song	Composer, producer, engineer	Nominated
2004	Libertad	La Ley	Best Rock Album By A Duo Or Group With Vocal	Producer, engineer	Won
2006	Amore	Andrea Bocelli	Best Engineered Album	Producer, mixer	Nominated
2008	Vive Ya (Vivere)	Andrea Bocelli and Laura Pausini	Record Of The Year	Producer, engineer, mixer	Nominated
2008	David Cavazos	David Cavazos	Best Engineered Album	Producer, engineer, mixer	Nominated
2008	Rhythm & Romance	Kenny G	Best Engineered Album	Engineer, mixer	Nominated
2011	Días Nuevos	Gian Marco	Best Engineered Album	Engineer, mixer	Nominated
2014	Amor En Portofino	Andrea Bocelli	Best Traditional Pop Vocal Album	Producer, mixer	Nominated
2015	N/A	N/A	Trustees Award	N/A	Won
2016	Me Faltarás	Andrea Bocelli	Record Of The Year	Producer, engineer	Nominated
2016	Cinema (Edición en Español)	Andrea Bocelli	Album Of The Year	Producer, engineer	Nominated
2016	Cinema (Edición en Español)	Andrea Bocelli	Best Traditional Pop Vocal Album	Producer, engineer	Nominated

== Discography ==
- 1968: Newport Years, Oscar Peterson (Mastering Engineer)
- 1974: Elis & Tom, Antonio Carlos Jobin & Elis Regina (Engineer)
- 1975: "Make the World Go Away", Donny & Marie Osmond (Engineer)
- 1978: From the Inside, Alice Cooper (Engineer)
- 1981: Ella Abraca Jobim, Ella Fitzgerald (Engineer)
- 1981: The Completion Backwards Principle, The Tubes (Engineer)
- 1982: Chicago 16, Chicago (Engineer, Mixing)
- 1982: Janet Jackson, Janet Jackson (Mixing)
- 1982: Thriller, Michael Jackson (Engineer)
- 1983: Can't Slow Down, Lionel Richie (Engineer, Mixing)
- 1983: Outside Inside, The Tubes (Engineer, Mixing)
- 1984: 1100 Bel Air Place, Julio Iglesias (Engineer, Mixing)
- 1984: Chicago 17, Chicago (Engineer, Mixing)
- 1984: Footloose Original Soundtrack (Remixing, Mixing)
- 1984: Private Dancer, Tina Turner (Remixing)
- 1984: What About Me?, Kenny Rogers (Engineer, Mixing)
- 1985: The Broadway Album, Barbra Streisand (Engineer, Remixing)
- 1985: The Color Purple Original Motion Picture Soundtrack (Engineer)
- 1985: Eaten Alive, Diana Ross (Mixing)
- 1985: Encontros e Despedidas, Milton Nascimento (Mixing)
- 1986: Very Best of Michael McDonald, Michael McDonald (Remixing)
- 1986: "All I Wanted", Kansas (Mixing)
- 1987: Bad, Michael Jackson (Drums, Engineer)
- 1987: Richard Marx, Richard Marx (Producer, Engineer, Mixing)
- 1990: Pretty Woman (Credited as co-producer for three songs)
- 1990: Go West Young Man, Michael W. Smith (Mixing)
- 1990: Unison, Celine Dion (Engineer, Mixing)
- 1992: Myriam Hernandez, Myriam Hernandez (Mixing)
- 1993: Aries, Luis Miguel (Mixing)
- 1993: Back to Broadway, Barbra Streisand (Engineer, Mixing)
- 1993: Colour of My Love, Celine Dion (Engineer)
- 1993: My World, Ray Charles (Mixing)
- 1993: Send Me A Lover, Taylor Dayne (Producer, Engineer, Mixing)
- 1993: Touch of Music in the Night, Michael Crawford (Engineer)
- 1994: Crazy, Julio Iglesias (Engineer, Mixing)
- 1994: Miracles: The Holiday Album, Kenny G (Engineer)
- 1995: Carretera, Julio Iglesias (Engineer)
- 1995: Don't Bore Us, Get to the Chorus: Greatest Hits, Roxette (Mixing)
- 1995: The French Album, Celine Dion (Mixing)
- 1995: Invisible, La Ley (Producer, Engineer, Mixing)
- 1996: Day, Babyface (Engineer, String Engineer)
- 1996: Dove C’e Musica, Eros Ramazzotti (Mixing)
- 1996: Epiphany: The Best of Chaka Khan Vol. 1, Chaka Khan (Producer)
- 1996: Falling Into You, Celine Dion (Producer, Engineer, Mixing)
- 1996: The Mirror Has Two Faces, Marvin Hamlisch (Engineer)
- 1996: Moment, Kenny G (Engineer)
- 1996: Star Bright, Vanessa Williams (Engineer, Mixing)
- 1996: Tango, Julio Iglesias (Engineer, String Engineer)
- 1997: Higher Ground, Barbra Streisand (Engineer, Mixing)
- 1997: Innamorato, Riccardo Cocciante (Mixing, Recording Technician)
- 1997: Let's Talk About Love, Celine Dion (Producer, Engineer, Mixing)
- 1997: Still Waters, Bee Gees (Engineer)
- 1998: Bathhouse Betty, Bette Midler (Engineer)
- 1998: Because You Loved Me: Songs of Diane Warren, Johnny Mathis (Producer, Engineer, Mixing)
- 1998: Believe, Cher (Mixing)
- 1998: Body of Work, Paul Anka (Producer)
- 1998: The Boy is Mine, Monica (Engineer)
- 1998: Greatest Hits, Steve Perry (Engineer)
- 1998: Jade, Corey Hart (Mixing)
- 1998: Love Will Always Win, Faith Hill (Mixing)
- 1998: My Love Is Your Love, Whitney Houston (Engineer)
- 1998: R., R Kelly (Engineer) 1998: Vuelve, Ricky Martin (Mixing)
- 1999: 25th Anniversary Edition, KC & The Sunshine Band (Mixing)
- 1999: Inolvidable, Vol. 2: Enamorado de Ti, Jose L. Rodriguez & Los Panchos (Mixing)
- 1999: Rainbow, Mariah Carey (Mixing)
- 1999: Sogno, Andrea Bocelli (Engineer, Mixing)
- 2000: Love Songs, Deniece Williams (Engineer, Mixing)
- 2000: Seul, Garou (Engineer, Mixing)
- 2000: Uno, La Ley (Producer, Engineer, Mixing)
- 2001: Greatest Hits: HIStory, Vol. 1, Michael Jackson (Engineer)
- 2001: Invincible, Michael Jackson (Engineer, Mixing)
- 2001: Josh Groban, Josh Groban (Producer, Engineer, Mixing)
- 2001: Loves Makes the World, Carole King (Producer, Engineer, Mixing)
- 2001: MTV Unplugged, Alejandro Sanz (Arranger, Producer, Engineer, Mixing)
- 2001: Q: The Musical Biography of Quincy Jones, Quincy Jones (Engineer)
- 2001: Taberna del Buda, Café Quijano (Arranger, Producer, Engineer)
- 2001: Yo por Ti, Olga Tañón (Producer, Mixing)
- 2002: Mended, Marc Anthony (String Engineer)
- 2002: Moulin Rouge Original Soundtrack (Mixing)
- 2002: A New Day Has Come, Celine Dion (Arranger, Producer, Engineer, Mixing)
- 2002: Paradise, Kenny G (Engineer, Mixing)
- 2002: Prelude: The Best of Charlotte Church, Charlotte Church (Engineer)
- 2002: Quizás, Enrique Iglesias (Mixing)
- 2002: Sobrevivir, Olga Tañón (Producer, Engineer, Mixing)
- 2002: Twisted Angel, LeAnn Rimes (Engineer)
- 2003: The Best of Me, David Foster (Producer, Engineer, Mixing)
- 2003: Closer, Josh Groban (Engineer, Mixing)
- 2003: Let It Snow, Michael Bublé (Engineer, Mixing)
- 2003: Libertad, La Ley (Arranger, Producer, Engineer)
- 2004: Come Fly With Me, Michael Bublé (Producer, Engineer, Mixing)
- 2004: En La Luna, Reyli (Mixing)
- 2004: Live At The Greek, Josh Groban (Producer, Engineer, Mixing)
- 2004: Renee Olstead, Renee Olstead (Producer, Engineer, Mixing)
- 2005: #1's, Destiny's Child (Producer, Engineer, Mixing)
- 2005: Ancora, Il Divo (Vocal Engineer)
- 2005: Caught In The Act, Michael Bublé (Producer, Engineer, Mixing)
- 2005: Home, Michael Bublé (Producer, Engineer, Mixing)
- 2005: It's Time, Michael Bublé (Producer, Engineer, Mixing)
- 2006: Amor, Andrea Bocelli (Arranger, Producer, Engineer)
- 2006: Awake, Josh Groban (Producer, Engineer, Mixing)
- 2006: Duets: An American Classic, Tony Bennett (Vocal Mixing)
- 2006: Under the Desert Sky, Andrea Bocelli (Producer, Mixing)
- 2006: Vittorio, Vittorio Grigolo (Mixing)
- 2007: Best of Andrea Bocceli: Vivere, Andrea Bocelli (Producer, Engineer)
- 2007: Christmas Wish, Olivia Newton-John (Engineer)
- 2007: D’Elles, Celine Dion (Engineer, Mixing)
- 2007: Noel, Josh Groban (Engineer, Mixing)
- 2007: Taking Chances, Celine Dion (Engineer)
- 2008: Brasileiro, Antonio Carlos Jobim (Technician)
- 2008: David Cavazos, David Cavazos (Producer, Mixing)
- 2008: Rhythm and Romance, Kenny G (Engineer, Mixing)
- 2008: Vivere: Live in Tuscany, Andrea Bocelli (Producer, Engineer, Mixing)
- 2009: Michael Bublé Meets Madison Square Garden, Michael Bublé (Producer, Mixing)
- 2009: Patrizio, Patrizio Buanne (Producer, Engineer, Mixing, Rhythm Arrangements)
- 2015: El Amor, Gloria Trevi (Producer)
- 2015: Cinema, Andrea Bocelli (Producer)
- 2017: The Journey, Thomas Spencer (Producer)
- 2019: Emociones: Mi Canto al Ídolo, Edward Mena (Producer)

== Recorded in Los Angeles ==
Currently, Humberto is the director of the company «Recorded in Los Angeles». https://RecordedInLosAngeles.com
