= Latin ballad =

Music genre derivative of bolero

- Native name: Balada romántica
- Stylistic origins: Bolero, Chanson, Canzone, Classical music, French and Italian ballads, Peruvian waltz
- Cultural origins: Early 1960s, Los Angeles, California, New York, Texas, Puerto Rico, Cuba, Mexico, Spain, Italy, France, Venezuela, Peru, Latin America
- Typical instruments: Vocals; guitar; piano; orchestra

Other topics
- Canción melódica

Latin ballad (Spanish: balada romántica) is a sentimental ballad derived from bolero that originated in the early 1960s in Los Angeles, California and Southern California.

Some of the best known artists of the Latin ballad are Julio Iglesias, Mocedades, José Luis Rodriguez, Luis Miguel, Camilo Sesto, Emmanuel, Nino Bravo, Roberto Carlos, Ricardo Montaner, Raphael, Mijares and José José among others. Because of its difficulty, the Latin balladeers are often recognized as skilled singers such as the case of Nino Bravo, Camilo Sesto, José José, Luis Miguel or Raphael. In recent decades it has become the dominant musical genre of Latin pop.

== Origin and evolution ==
Music fans can find roots of "Ballads" in pre-war years. Blues and jazz in the United States underwent transformations that were brewing since the 1930s and 1940s and that led to the origin of new rhythms. Bing Crosby's "White Christmas", Frank Sinatra, Marlene Dietrich's "Lili Marleen" and Dooley Wilson's "As Time Goes By" were examples of early Ballad singers. Rock and roll in the mid-1950s transforms contemporary types of music in terms of how to sing them and instrumentation, which includes electric instruments in addition to the traditional balladism. Ballads spread in the acetates records and in American cinema to the world also influencing.

One of the main diffusers was Elvis Presley, when he diversified his music, in addition to rock and roll, cultivating the new ballad, influencing the romantic Sentimental ballad of the late decade (led by Paul Anka "You are my Destiny",1958, "Put your Head on my Shoulder",1959, and Neil Sedaka ). Postwar years 1950s, Latin America, Europe and the other continents received American musical influence and produced reissues of American ballads with new lyrics in native languages for more than a decade.

Trio Los Panchos gained latin ballad hits such as "Besame Mucho", "Sabor a Mí", "Solamente Una Vez", and "Quizas, Quizas, Quizas". The Latin or romantic ballad has its origin in the Latin American bolero in the 1950s (Lucho Gatica, Leo Marini), but also in the romantic song in Italian (Domenico Modugno) and French (Charles Aznavour, George Mustaki) in the 1960s and 1970s. In Mexico, the ballad recorded as such is "Sonata de Amor" (Sonata of Love) of Mario Álvarez in 1961. In 1965 the famous bolero singer-songwriter Armando Manzanero, sang his ballad, "Pobres besos míos" (My Poor Kisses).

Latin ballad was popular during the 1970s in Latin America, where artists such as Mocedades, Emmanuel, Julio Iglesias, José José, José Luis Rodriguez, Camilo Sesto, Raphael, Roberto Carlos, Rocío Dúrcal and others released hits. The main hits of Mocedades "Eres Tú", José José were "El triste" (The Sad One), "La nave del olvido" (The Ship of Forgetfullness), "Te extraño" (I Miss You, also written by Manzanero), "Amar y querer" (To love and To want). By Roberto Carlos(singer) the songs "Amigos" (Friends) or "Detalles" (Details). By Camilo Sesto the hits "Algo de Mí" (Something from Me), "Perdóname" (Forgive Me), "Si Tú Te Vas" (If you leave), "Melina", "Jamás" (Never), "Todo por Nada" (All for Nothing), "Fresa Salvaje" (Wild Strawberry) . Rocío Dúrcal enjoyed Latin America success and was known as "La Dama de la canción" (The Lady of Song). These songs gained hit in Latin America.

The heyday of the ballad was romantic in the 1980s, where artists such as Julio Iglesias, Amanda Miguel, Ricardo Montaner, Diego Verdaguer and others released a big number of hits. The main hits of Julio Iglesias "To All the Girls I've Loved Before", Amanda Miguel were "Así no te amará jamás" (This Way He Will Never Love You), by 1984 among many others that were released in Los Angeles. These songs are widely known today in Southern California.

In the course of their existence the genre merged with diverse rhythms to form several variants, such as romantic salsa and cumbia aside others.

From the 1990s, globalization and media internationalization processes that integrated contributed to the ballad's spread international spread and further homogenize around a common Latin identity. As part of the Latin Americanization of the United States and the dominant presence in the genre of multinational record labels, Miami has become the main producer of ballads which in turn has fed back trends of migration of Latino and Hispanic performers, producers and musicians to that city. By the turn of the 2010s however, Latin ballads have begun to lose popularity as uptempo Latin genres such as bachata, reggaeton, and Spanish-language electropop music have gained popularity with the Hispanic audience in the radio.

== Development ==
The ethnomusicologist Daniel Party defines the romantic ballad as "a love song of slow tempo, played by a solo singer accompanied by an orchestra usually" .

The ballad and bolero are often confused and songs can fall in one or the other category without too much precision. The distinction between them is referring primarily to a more sophisticated and more metaphorical language and subtle bolero, compared with a more direct expression of the ballad.

Party stressed that the romantic ballad derive from "Latin common sensibility" He draws on the research of Jesus Martin-Barbero to highlight that the romantic ballad is an expression of a broader cultural process, called by Martin-Barbero as "emotional integration in Latin America", a phenomenon that would explain a generalization of the ways of feeling and express the emotions of the Latinos, through gestures, sounds, rhythms and cadences common literary devices, linked in turn to the telenovela.

== See also ==
- Ballad
- Latin pop
- Latin rock
- Latin music (genre)
- Chicano rock
