= 2016 in Latin music =

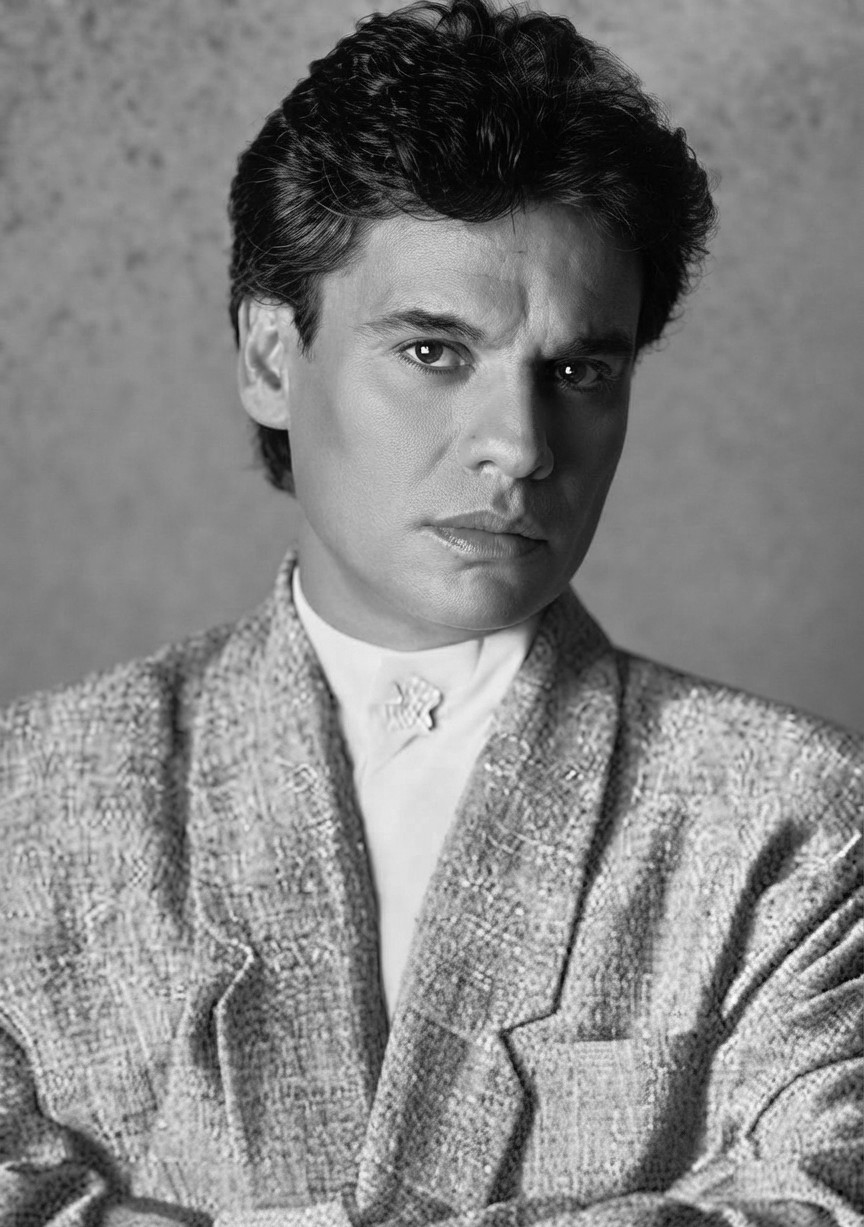
Mexican singer-songwriter Juan Gabriel was posthumously named Top Latin Artist of the Year in the United States by Billboard.

This is a list of notable events in Latin music (music from Spanish- and Portuguese-speaking regions of Latin America, Latin Europe, and the United States) that took place in 2016.

== Events ==
- February 24: Spanish singer Enrique Iglesias is recognized by the Guinness World Record for having the most number one songs on the Billboard Hot Latin Songs chart and the longest running song with "Bailando".
- February 25: "Ginza by J Balvin sets the record for the longest-leading song at number one on the Hot Latin Songs by a solo artist. The song spent 21 weeks at No. 1 on the chart.
- March 31:
  - The 22nd annual Broadcast Music Inc. Latin music awards is held. Mexican pop singer Gloria Trevi is awarded the President's Award for her contributions to the Latin pop field.
  - Sergio George signs with Marc Anthony's label Magnus Media, the new deal "will oversee George's interests in all areas of the entertainment industry throughout the [popular market]".
- April 21: Singer-songwriter José Miguel Fernández Sastrón is elected president of the Spanish Society of Authors and Editors (SGAE).
- April 22:
  - In a report by Nielsen, the purchasing power of Latinos in the United States was at $1.5 trillion. With an average annual spending of $135 on music, the report found Hispanics spending more money than their non-Hispanic counterparts.
  - Billboard magazine announced Marco Antonio Solis to receive the Lifetime Achievement Award after releasing twelve albums peaking at number one on the U.S. Top Latin Albums chart in his career, the most of any artist.
  - For the May 2, 2016 issue of Billboard magazine, Leila Cobo interviewed female music executives and Chiquis Rivera, Leslie Grace, and Carla Morrison on the declining presence of females on Billboard music charts.
- April 25 – 28: The 2016 annual Billboard Latin Music Conference is held.
- June 7: At the 2016 Gardel Awards, Argentine rock singer Luis Alberto Spinetta's posthumous released album Los Amigo (2012) receives Album of the Year honor. Afro-Uruguayan singer Ruben Rada was named Male Pop Artist of the Year and Production of the Year, while Argentine rock band Ciro y Los Persas' song "Antes y Después" won Song of the Year. Other winners included Litto Nebia for Best Rock Album, and Julieta Rada for Best New Pop Album.
- June 8: American hip-hop recording artist Jay Z appoints bachata singer Romeo Santos as CEO of the newly formed Roc Nation Latino.
- June 9: Former American Society of Composers, Authors and Publishers (ASCAP) A&R representative, Ana Rosa Santiago became acting VIP president of the Latin division of Universal Music Publishing Group.
- June 12: Following the Orlando nightclub shooting (which occurred during a Latin night event), Latin music events throughout Orange County, Florida are uncertain if future events will be canceled. Latin DJ Candy Boy, spoke out on the lack of security at events he has hosted, while Latin music acts such as Proyecto Uno, Ilegales, Pitbull, Prince Royce, and Farruko, have upcoming shows that may be affected as a result of the events that occurred.
- June 25: The first Festival Chispa took place in Albuquerque, New Mexico, focusing on Latin music and culture at the National Hispanic Cultural Center.
- June 26: Despite a decrease on physical and digital consumption in the United States, Latin America was found by the International Federation of the Phonographic Industry (IFPI) to have been the only region to have the highest growth rate for the fifth consecutive time. Digital sales were up 44.5 percent and music streaming increased to 80.4 percent. The study found that Brazil and Argentina were the two largest markets. The Recording Industry Association of America (RIAA), found that Latin music overall decrease 6.3 percent from the previous year.
- July 2: Alan Ramírez, who is the lead singer of Banda Sinaloense MS de Sergio Lizárraga, was shot in the neck during a Mexico City tour. He is currently in the hospital and is expected to recover.
- July 4: The inaugural Lollapalooza Colombia was canceled after Barbadian singer Rihanna dropped out and organizers failing to find a replacement.
- July 7: The Hollywood Chamber of Commerce announced the class of 2017 for their Hollywood Walk of Fame inductees including Selena and announced Pitbull's induction set for July 15.
- July 8
  - Salsa singer Victor Manuelle's "Imaginar" became the singer's 28th chart-topper, breaking the tie with Marc Anthony for most number ones on the Tropical Songs chart. With "Imaginar", Manuelle tied with Spanish singer Enrique Iglesias for most Latin number one singles.
  - The New York City annual Latin Alternative Music Conference commenced, which catered the Latin alternative scene.
- September 9: iHeartRadio announces the creation of the iHeartLatino, a division dedicated to Latin music, a first for a major radio station company. The division is led by Enrique Santos.
- November 17: The 17th Annual Latin Grammy Awards are held at the T-Mobile Arena in Paradise, Nevada.
  - "La Bicicleta" by Carlos Vives and Shakira wins the Latin Grammy Awards for Song of the Year and Record of the Year.
  - Juan Gabriel posthumously wins the Latin Grammy Award for Album of the Year for Los Dúo, Vol. 2.
  - Manuel Medrano wins Best New Artist.
  - American singer Marc Anthony is honored as the Latin Recording Academy Person of the Year.

== Bands reformed ==
- Amber Rose (1997–2000)
- Bandana (2001–2004)

== Number-one albums and singles by country ==
- List of Hot 100 number-one singles of 2016 (Brazil)
- List of number-one songs of 2016 (Colombia)
- List of number-one albums of 2016 (Mexico)
- List of number-one songs of 2016 (Mexico)
- List of number-one albums of 2016 (Portugal)
- List of number-one albums of 2016 (Spain)
- List of number-one singles of 2016 (Spain)
- List of number-one Billboard Latin Albums from the 2010s
- List of number-one Billboard Hot Latin Songs of 2016
- List of number-one singles of 2016 (Venezuela)

== Awards ==
- 2016 Premio Lo Nuestro
- 2016 Billboard Latin Music Awards
- 2016 Latin American Music Awards
- 2016 Latin Grammy Awards
- 2016 Tejano Music Awards

== Albums released ==
=== First quarter ===
==== January ====
Day	Title	Artist	Genre(s)	Singles	Label
1	Roberto Sierra: Sinfonía No. 3 "La Salsa", Borikén, El Baile & Beyond the Silence of Sorrow	Martha Guth			
1	De Fiesta	Rombai			
1	Sol Detente	Álvaro López and ResQBand	Latin Christian		Independiente
5	Território Conquistado	Larissa Luz			
8	En Vivo en la Mexico	Joan Sebastian			
8	Bandana La Vuelta	Bandana			
15	¿Donde Están?	José Lugo and Guasábara Combo			
16	Relevante	Mario Diníz			
21	Ayer, Hoy y Siempre	Los Herederos de Nuevo León			
21	Mi Ritmo Es Bueno	Bobby Valentín			
22	Nueve canciones de amor y una de esperanza	Elefantes			
22	The King of Romance	Ken-Y			
22	Imperio Nazza: Justin Quiles Edition	Justin Quiles			
29	Vive	José María Napoleón			
29	Me Esta Gustando	Banda Los Recoditos			
29	Yo	Manuel Lombo			
29	Lubna	Mónica Naranjo			
29	Vulnerable A Ti	Marian y Mariel			
29	Durón: Lagrimas, Amor...	Eva Juárez, Rogério Gonçalves, and A Corte Musical			

==== February ====
Day	Title	Artist	Genre(s)	Singles	Label
2	Outras histórias	Deolinda			
4	Hambre Por El Dios Vivo	New Wine			
5	Yo Creo	Carlos Rivera			
5	Que Bendición	Banda Sinaloense MS de Sergio Lizarraga			
5	Tributo a los Alegres de Terán	Pesado			
5	Una Ultima Vez	Sin Bandera			
9	Big Band	Carrera Quinta			
12	Imparables	Andy & Lucas			
12	Magia	Luis Ramiro			
12	Cicatriz en la Matrix	Lendakaris Muertos			
12	Canciones para robots romanticos	Fangoria			
12	Mi Vicio y Mi Addicion	Kevin Ortiz			
12	El Regreso a la Habana	Aymee Nuviola			
12	Carlos Gardel Original	Leonardo Pastore			
12	Canto América	La Orquesta Sinfonietta, Michael Spiro, and Wayne Wallace			
16	Entre Colegas	Andy González			
18	Me Pongo de Pie	Noel Torres			
18	Lo Que Pesa Mi Palabra	Hijos de Barron			
18	Yo Soy Iván	Grupo Maximo Grado			
19	25 Años	Marcos Vidal			
21	Ascensão	Various artists	Brazilian roots		Selo Sesc
26	Romaphonic Sessions	Andrés Calamaro			
26	Buenaventura	La Santa Cecilia			
26	Eres la Persona Correcta en el Momento Equivocado	Río Roma			
26	Moura	Ana Moura			
26	Soy Luna	Various artists	Pop	"Alas"; "Sobre ruedas"	Walt Disney Records

==== March ====
Day	Title	Artist	Genre(s)	Singles	Label
1	Levántate	Explosión Negra			
4	Recuerden Mi Estilo	Los Plebes del Rancho de Ariel Camacho			
4	No Manchester	Mexrrissey		"International Playgirl"	Nacional Records
4	Corridos Time, Season Two – Los Implacables	Los Tucanes de Tijuana			
4	El Poeta Halley	Love of Lesbian			
4	Gira	Los Huayra			
4	Tierra Mojada	Los Ramones De Nuevo León			
4	Rompiendo El Silencio	Remedios Amaya			
8	Jo competeixo	Manel			
11	La Bandononona En Mi Rancho	Banda Rancho Viejo de Julio Aramburo La Bandononon			
11	Irremediablemente Buenos Aires	Claudia Montero			
18	Perdido por Perdido	Iván Noble			
18	Faz a Festa Funk	Tubarão			
18	Between Brothers	Raul Agraz			
18	Impredecible	Bareto			
18	Ginastera: The Vocal Album	Various artists			
18	Brindando por Nada	Las Pelotas			
20	Vivo X la 25	La 25			
25	Disculpen la Demoura	Marcelo Moura			
25	Tropix	Céu			
25	A Luneta E Tempo (Trilha Sonora Original De Alceu Valença)	Alceu Valença			
26	A La Mar	Vicente García			Sony Music

=== Second quarter ===
==== April ====
Day	Title	Artist	Genre(s)	Singles	Label
1	Si Yo Fuera un Chico	Helen Ochoa			
1	La Sonora Santanera en su 60 Aniversario	Sonora Santanera			
1	Ciudad De Luz	Generasion			
2	Umbral	Melkin			
7	Halo	Juana Molina			
8	Mis Ídolos, Hoy Mis Amigos!!!	Julión Álvarez y Su Norteño Banda			
8	Adaptación	La Ley			
8	L.H.O.N.	Illya Kuryaki and the Valderramas			
8	Amiga	Álex Anwandter	Latin alternative	"Siempre Es Viernes en Mi Corazón"	Nacional Records
8	Full HD	Cali Flow Latino			
8	Nuevo Ciclo	Chambao			
13	Capitão Fausto têm os dias contados	Capitão Fausto			
15	A Todo Volumen	La Septima Banda			
15	We Love Disney (Latino)	Various artists			
15	Un Amigo Tendrás	Jay Perez and the Band			
15	Alto Al Fuego	Traviezoz de La Zierra			
15	Mujeres Por Colombia, Vol. 2	Various artists			
15	Ensemble	Rui Massena			
19	Tronco Viejo	Johnny Ventura			
22	Visualízate	Gente de Zona		"Piensas (Dile la Verdad)" "La Gozadera" "Traidora"	Sony Music Latin
22	La Alcaldia Del Perreo	Jowell & Randy			
22	Sexo Con Modelos	Marilina Bertoldi			
22	Viento del Este	Loquillo			
22	Arde Estocolmo	Pedro Guerra			
22	Samba De Chico	Hamilton de Holanda			
22	Reluciente, Rechinante y Aterciopelado	Aterciopelados			
23	Pronto Auxilio (En Vivo)	Yashira Guidini			
25	Bar Do Leo	Leonardo			
28	Casa De Bituca	Hamilton De Holanda Quinteto			
29	Tini	Martina Stoessel	Pop	"Siempre Brillarás" "Great Escape" "Got Me Started" "Si Tu Te Vas"	Hollywood Records
29	Pégate de Mi Mambo	Manny Manuel	Merengue		Universal Music Latino
29	Lleno de Vida	Adrian			
29	Vestirte de Amor	Pipe Peláez and Manuel Julián			
29	A Vida Num Segundo	Ceremonya			
29	Panda E Os Amigos	Panda E Os Amigos			
30	Mosaico	Bruno Miranda			

==== May ====
Day	Title	Artist	Genre(s)	Singles	Label
2	Tropical Infinito	Antonio Adolfo			
3	Canciones de Sol	Marta Gómez			
6	Latina	Thalía	Latin Pop, Reggaeton, Dance-pop, Pop-rock, Salsa, Cumbia, Vallenato, Bolero	"Desde Esa Noche" "Vuélveme a Querer"	Sony Music Latin
6	Hecho a Mano	Joss Favela			
6	Con Tololoche	Remmy Valenzuela			Fonovisa
6	Llegue para Quedarme	Juan Jose & San Juan Habana			
6	Yo Te Esperare	Siggno			
6	Guaco Histórico 2	Guaco			
6	Ilusión	Gaby Moreno			Metamorfosis
10	Genera	Treo			
12	Sobredosis	Yomil & El Dany			
12	Segir Latiendo	Sanalejo			
15	Sóis	João Victor			
20	Limonada	Kany García			Sony Music Latin
20	Soy	Lali	Pop, R&b, dubstep, reggae	"Soy" "Boomerang" "Ego"	Sony Music Argentina
20	Desde Adentro – Impuesto de Fe (En Vivo)	Babasónicos			
20	Desde Madrid: Live	Omar Alfanno			
26	Chamamé	Yangos	Brazilian roots		Independente
27	La Salvación de Solo y Juan	Los Fabulosos Cadillacs			
27	Doy la Cara	José Mercé			

==== June ====
Day	Title	Artist	Genre(s)	Singles	Label
3	Ilevitable	ILE			Sony Music Latin
3	Libre Otra Vez	La Arrolladora Banda El Limón			
3	No Pongan Esas Canciones	Espinoza Paz			
3	Inesperado	Anahí	Latin pop	"Rumba" "Boom Cha" "Eres" "Amnesia"	Universal Music Latin
3	Sax to Tango	Julio Botti and Pablo Ziegler			
3	Canções De Exílio	Jay Vaquer			
3	Danzas En Todos Los Tiempos	Edith Peña			
3	Amor de los dos	David Bustamante			
9	Deus Não Te Rejeita	Anderson Freire			
10	Inmortal	Gloria Trevi			
10	Habana Dreams	Pedrito Martinez Group			
10	Auténtico	Alejandro Lerner			
10	Arriba Abajo	123 Andrés			
10	José Serebrier Conducts Samuel Adler	Maximilian Hornung and José Serebrier			
10	Aquí Estoy	Mario Bautista			
10	3	David Carreira			
10	Cuba Sobre Cuerdas	Babalú Quinteto	Tropical		Merlín Producciones
17	Highway	Intocable			
17	Otro Formato de Musica	La Tribu de Abrante			
17	Des/Amor	Reik			
17	Lo que llevas en tu corazón	Elenco Junior Express			
17	Samba Book: Jorge Aragão	Various artists	Samba		Musickeria
20	Mi Familia	Gustavo Casenave			
24	Energía	J Balvin	Reggaeton	"Ginza" "Bobo" "Safari" "Sigo Extrañandote"	Capitol Latin
24	Bachata Nation	Toby Love			
24	Raíces	Banda el Recodo de Cruz Lizarraga			
24	Tecnoanimal	Gustavo Cordera			
24	Argentum	Carlos Franzetti			
24	Gardel Sinfónico	Ariel Ardit and Filarmónica De Medellín			
24	Magnética	María Toledo			
24	Tributo A Joan Sebastian y Rigoberto Alfaro	Mariachi Divas de Cindy Shea			
27	No Lo Había Dicho	Pepe Aguilar			
30	Toda la Vida	Daniel Santacruz			
30	Mercosul	Víctor Biglione			

=== Third quarter ===
==== July ====
Day	Title	Artist	Genre(s)	Singles	Label
1	Desde El Fondo	Kuisitambó			
5	Pregoneros De La Calle	Cosa Nuestra			
8	Senti2	Antonio José			
8	Ao Vivo – Melodias Do Sertão	Bruna Viola	Brazilian roots		Universal Music
15	Primera Fila	Las Tres Grandes: Eugenia León, Tania Libertad, and Guadalupe Pineda			
19	Anavitória	Anavitória	Pop		Universal Music
22	30 Años	Los Nocheros			
29	La Esperanza Frente a Mi	Danny Gokey			
29	Generación Maquinaria Est. 2006	La Maquinaria Norteño			
29	La Promesa	Justin Quiles			
30	El Sonero del Bailador	Hector "Pichie" Perez			

==== August ====
Day	Title	Artist	Genre(s)	Singles	Label
4	Leva-me a sério	Agir			
5	Tiempo	24 Horas			
8	Panda e os caricas 3	Panda e os caricas			
12	Vestido de Etiqueta por Eduardo Magallanes	Juan Gabriel	Latin pop		Fonovisa, Universal Music Group
12	Campesino	Los Originales de San Juan			
12	Todos Nuestros Átomos	Utopians	Rock en español		Sony Music, Popart Discos
12	Tudo nosso	Jamz	Pop		Som Livre
19	De Bem Com A Vida	Martinho da Vila			
25	Coletera	Coletera	Tropical fusion		Tambora
26	Alunizando	El Gran Combo de Puerto Rico			
26	Primera Cita	CNCO	Latin pop	"Tan Fácil" "Quisiera" "Reggaetón Lento (Bailemos)" "Para Enamorarte"	Sony Music Latin
26	Piénsalo	Los Palominos			Freddie
26	Soy Luna: Música en ti	Various artists	Pop	"Eres (Radio Disney Vivo)" "Valiente (Radio Disney Vivo)" "Alas (Radio Disney Vivo)"	Walt Disney
26	Monstruos	Leiva			
26	Culpable Tu	Alta Consigna			
26	Se Llama Flamenco	José Mijita	Flamenco		El Flamenco Vive

==== September ====
Day	Title	Artist	Genre(s)	Singles	Label
2	El Tren de los Regresos	Yordano	Latin pop		Sony Music Latin
2	A Danada sou eu	Ludmilla	Pop		Warner Music
3	Soltasbruxa	Francisco, el Hombre	Latin music, MPB, rock, carnival marchinha	"Calor da Rua"	Independent
9	Un Azteca en el Azteca	Vicente Fernández			
9	¿Van a Querer Mas?	Enigma Norteño			
9	Gilda, No Me Arrepiento de Este Amor	Natalia Oreiro			
12	Generacion Radical	BARAK	Latin Christian		Mar De Cristal Music & Ministerio Barak
15	Bucles	Patricia Malanca	Tango		Epsa Music
16	Pocho Aztlan	Brujeria			
16	No Que No (Banda Y Tololoche)	El Bebeto			
16	Gracias	Gemeliers			
16	Soledad 20 Años (En Vivo)	Soledad			
16	Daniel	Daniel	Música sertaneja		Universal Music
16	Alas Canciones	Los Cafres			Popart Discos
23	Desde el Rancho	Calibre 50			
23	Juntos Por La Sonora	La Sonora Dinamita	Tropical		
23	La Montaña Rusa	Dani Martín			
23	Até Pensei Que Fosse Minha	António Zambujo	MPB		MPB Discos, Universal Music Portugal
23	Devuélveme Mi Libertad	Frank Reyes	Bachata		Mojito, Frank Reyes & Asociados
23	Big Yauran	J Álvarez	Urban		On Top Of The World
23	El Círculo	Kase.O	Urban		Altafonte Bajo Licencia De Boa, Rap Solo
23	La Promesa de Thamar	Sig Ragga	Latin alternative		Sony Music
23	Brutown	The Baggios	Rock		Toca Discos
25	El Tuyero Ilustrado	Edward Ramírez & Rafa Pino	Folk		Independiente
26	Madera Latino: A Latin Jazz Interpretation On The Music Of Woody Shaw	Brian Lynch			
30	Dicen	Cristian Castro	Latin pop	"Decirte Adios"	Sony Music Latin
30	Motivan2	Zion & Lennox	Reggaeton	Embriágame, Otra Vez, Mi Tesoro	
30	Así es la Vida	Omar Ruiz			
30	De Plaza En Plaza (Cumbia Sinfonica)	Los Angeles Azules			
30	El Mayor de Mis Antojos	La Original Banda El Limon De Salvador Lizarraga	Banda		Luz, Sony Music
30	#TuMano En Vivo	Luciano Pereyra			
30	Pecado Capital	La Beriso			
30	No. 50	Los Invasores de Nuevo León	Norteño		Remex Music
30	MM3	Metá Metá	Rock		Jazz Village
30	Na luz do samba	Luciana Mello	Samba		Radar
Unknown	El Tren	Luis Salinas			Luis Salinas

==== October ====
Day	Title	Artist	Genre(s)	Singles	Label
3	Dixit Dominus: Vivaldi, Mozart, Handel	Jordi Savall	Classical		Alia Vox
6	20 Años – En Vivo En Café Vinilo	El Arranque	Tango		Vinilo Discos
7	En Estos Días	Regulo Caro			
7	MTV Unplugged	Miguel Bosé	Latin pop		Warner Music Spain
7	Hombre Afortunado	Crecer German			
7	11	Abel Pintos			
7	Latin Jazz Project, Vol. 1	Ray Obiedo			
7	Trenes, Aviones y Viajes Interplanetarios	Santiago Cruz			
7	Spain Forever	Michel Camilo and Tomatito			Universal Music Spain
7	Alma brasileira	Diogo Nogueira	Samba		EMI Brasil
11	Horacio Gutiérrez Plays Chopin & Schumann	Horacio Gutiérrez	Classical		Bridge
14	Blanco Perla	Cosculluela			
14	Libre	Franco De Vita	Latin pop	"¿Dónde Esta la Vida?"	Sony Music Latin
14	Latidos	Lapiz Conciente			
14	Y Al Final Quede Sin	Proyecto X			
14	El doble de tu mitad	Rulo y la contrabanda			
14	Se me amas	Xutos & Pontapés			
14	Música Mía	Victoria Sanabria			
14	Oddara	Jane Bunnett and Maqueque	Latin jazz		Linus Entertainment
17	Gracias	Cepillín	Children's		Alternativa Representa
19	La Monto Dondequiera	José Nogueras			
20	Puerto Rico es una Fiesta	Los Cantores de Bayamon			
21	Andamos en el Ruedo	Ulices Chaidez y Sus Plebes	Regional Mexican		
21	Alto Rango	Gadiel			
21	Te cuento un secreto	India Martínez			
21	Dejando Huellas	Anibal de Gracia y Sus Invitados			
21	La Gran Oscilación	Diamante Eléctrico	Rock en español		Mercado Negro, Criteria Entertainment
25	Ao Vivo Em Israel	Fernanda Brum	Latin Christian		MK Music
28	Paloma Negra Desde Monterrey	Jenni Rivera	Banda, ranchera	"Paloma Negra (Live)", "Mírame" (Live), "La Mentada Contestada" (Live), "Sufriendo A Solas" (Live)	Fonovisa, Universal Music Latin Entertainment
28	Ida y Vuelta	Ricardo Montaner	Latin pop, Banda	"Aunque Ahora Estés Con El"	Sony Music Latin
28	Indestructible	Diego el Cigala			
28	Casa	Iván Ferreiro			
28	Putumayo Presents: Latin Christmas	Various artists			
28	ABUC	Roberto Fonseca			
28	Música De Compositores Costarricenses Vol. 2	Eddie Mora Bermúdez and Orquesta Sinfónica Nacional de Costa Rica	Classical		Independiente
29	Como Lo Haciamos Antes	Andrés Jiménez, "el Jíbaro"			

==== November ====
Day	Title	Artist	Genre(s)	Singles	Label
4	Solo Por Tu Gracia	The Rock En Español			
4	El planeta imaginario	La Oreja de Van Gogh			
4	Fase Dos	Juan Pablo Díaz	Salsa		Juanpi Música
4	El Más Loco	Oscarito			
4	Salsangroove	Salsangroove	Tropical fusion		Independiente
4	Troco Likes Ao Vivo: Um Filme de Tiago Iorc	Tiago Iorc	Pop		Som Livre
4	Jardim-Pomar	Nando Reis	Rock		Relicario
4	Delírio no Circo	Roberta Sá	Samba		Relicario
4	1977	Luan Santana	Música sertaneja		Som Livre
4	Live	Simone & Simaria	Música sertaneja		Universal Music
4	Batom Bacaba	Patrícia Bastos	Brazilian roots		Tratore
No Embalo Do	Pinduca	Brazilian roots		Na Music	
9	Origen	Daniel Minimalia			Zouma
11	No Me Vuelvas A Besar Así	Solido			
11	Quítate las Gafas	Melendi			
11	Hasta Que Se Apague el Sol	Isabel Pantoja			
11	Coisas Do Meu Imaginário	Rael	Urban		Laboratório Fantasma
11	Vente Conmigo	Las Migas	Flamenco		Concert Music
11	Viva Mi Planeta 2!	Cantajuego	Children's		Sony Music Spain
14	Outra Coisa – The Music of Moacir Santos	Anat Cohen and Marcello Gonçalves	Latin jazz		Anzic
18	Son del Mar	Chigualito			
18	Viejo Marihuano	Cartel de Santa			
18	Durmiendo En El Lugar Equivocado	La Adictiva			
18	Rockteño	Siggno			
18	De Puerto Rico para el Mundo	Various artists			
18	Mis Decretos	El Chapo de Sinaloa	Banda		Luz, Sony Music
18	II	De la Tierra	Rock		Sony Music Latin
18	Aventuras II	Blitz	Rock		Deck
18	Silva Canta Marisa	Silva	MPB		Slap Música Brasil
20	MexiCkanos	C-Kan			
23	La Parranda De Gaitanes	Gaitanes	Tropical		Gaitán Bros Productions
24	Sol	Gustavo Galo			Independente
25	La Marca	Grupo Manía			
28	Vengo Caminando	Diego Guerrero			Diego Guerrero Music
30	Besos Callejeros	Maribel Guardia	Banda		Tico Sounds

==== December ====
Day	Title	Artist	Genre(s)	Singles	Label
2	Hijos del Mar	David Bisbal	Latin pop	Universal Music Spain	
2	Otra Liga	Jory Boy			
2	El Milagro en el Tepeyac	Las Flores and Indira Montes			
2	Barro y Fauna	Eruca Sativa	Rock en español		Sony Music Argentina
2	Los Tercos	Los Tercos	Norteño		Discos Y Cintas Serca
2	13	Rodolfo Mederos	Tango		BN
2	¡Churo!	Mariana Baraj	Children's		S-Music
9	Homenaje a La Gran Señora	Natalia Jiménez	Latin pop, mariachi		Sony Music Latin
9	Carlos Vives + Amigos Desde El Estadio El Campin de Bogota	Carlos Vives			
9	Un Millón de Primaveras	Lalo Mora	Banda		Mora Music
9	Boogie Naipe	Mano Brown	Pop		Radar
10	Pa' Fuera	C4 Trío & Desorden Público			Orden Privado
13	San Juan Grand Prix	Álvaro Díaz			
15	Patrimonio Cultural	Jorge Oñate and Alvaro López	Vallenato		Sony Music
15	Mixturas	Orquesta De Tango De La UNA	Tango		Epsa Music
15	Armando Manzanero Presenta A Alvera Aquí	Alvera			
16	+ Misturado	Mart'nália	Samba		Biscoito Fino
22	Piango, Piango	Yuvisney Aguilar & Afrocuban Jazz Quartet	Latin jazz		Rumor
23	MUG	Yamil & El Dany			
23	Vengo a Aclarar	El Fantasma			

=== Unknown ===
Title	Artist	Genre(s)	Singles	Label
Alma mestiza	Rebeca Lane			

== Best-selling records ==
=== Best-selling albums ===
The following is a list of the top 10 best-selling Latin albums in the United States in 2016, according to Billboard.

Rank	Album	Artist
1	Los Dúo, Vol. 2	Juan Gabriel
2	Recuerden Mi Estilo	Los Plebes del Rancho de Ariel Camacho
3	Los Dúo	Juan Gabriel
4	Que Bendición	Banda Sinaloense MS De Sergio Lizarraga
5	Amor & Pasión	Il Divo
6	Vestido de Etiqueta por Eduardo Magallanes	Juan Gabriel
7	Las Bandas Romanticas de America 2016	Various artists
8	Lo Mejor de...Selena	Selena
9	Lecciones Para El Corazón	Julión Álvarez
10	Energia	J Balvin

=== Best-performing songs ===
The following is a list of the top 10 best-performing Latin songs in the United States in 2016, according to Billboard.

Rank	Single	Artist
1	"Hasta el Amanecer"	Nicky Jam
2	"Duele el Corazón"	Enrique Iglesias featuring Wisin
3	"Ginza"	J Balvin
4	"La Bicicleta"	Carlos Vives and Shakira
5	"Solo Con Verte"	Banda Sinaloense MS de Sergio Lizarraga
6	"Bobo"	J Balvin
7	"El Perdedor"	Maluma featuring Yandel
8	"Shaky Shaky"	Daddy Yankee
9	"Encantadora"	Yandel
10	"El Perdón"	Nicky Jam and Enrique Iglesias

== Deaths ==
- January 1 – Gilberto Mendes, 93, Brazilian composer
- January 5 – Pachy Carrasco, 47, Dominican Republic musician, composer, and producer
- January 6 – Alfredo "Chocolate" Armenteros, 87, Cuban trumpeter
- January 10 – Hernán Gamboa, 69, Venezuelan musician, original member of Serenata Guayanesa group
- January 18 – Pablo Manavello, 65, Italian-Venezuelan Arranger, producer, and songwriter
- February 3 – Alba Solís, 88, Argentine singer and actress
- February 23 – Rey Caney, 89, Cuban musician.
- March 9 – Naná Vasconcelos, 71, Brazilian jazz percussionist and vocalist
- March 10 – Larry Salinas, Venezuelan choir
- April 1 – Candita Batista, 99, Cuban singer
- April 2
  - Manolo Tena, 64, Spanish singer.
  - Gato Barbieri, 83, Argentine jazz saxophonist, pneumonia.
- April 11 – Ernesto Baffa,83, Argentine bandoneon musician, composer, and music director
- April 13 – Mariano Mores, 98, Argentine tango composer and pianist.
- April 16
  - Peter Rock, 70, Austrian-born Chilean rock musician
  - Ismael Quintana, 78, Puerto Rican singer and composer.
- May 15 – Cauby Peixoto, 85, Brazilian singer, pneumonia
- May 16 – Emilio Navaira, 53, American country and Tejano singer (Life Is Good), heart failure.
- June 7 – Juana la del Revuelo, 64, Spanish Flamenco singer.
- June 11 – José Luis Armenteros, 72, Spanish musician and composer.
- June 12 – Adrian Posse, 67, Argentine composer, producer, and industry executive.
- June 13 – Jose Lugo, 56, American musician, pianist, producer, and arranger.
- June 19 – Alejandro Jano Fuentes, 45, The Voice Mexico (murdered).
- June 20 – Chayito Valdez, 71, Mexican-born American folk singer and actress, complications from a cerebral hemorrhage.
- June 29 – Inocente Carreño, 96, Venezuelan composer
- June 30 – Juan Habichuela, 82–83, Spanish flamenco guitarist
- July 5 – Lupe Tijerina, 69, Mexican singer and accordionist
- July 6 – Alirio Díaz, 92, Venezuelan classical guitarist and composer.
- July 11 – Rick Marroquin, 45, Creative Artists Agency member, worked on Hispanic marketing (lung cancer)
- July 12 – Lupe De La Cruz, music executive marketing on EMI Latin and Univision Records
- July 13 – El Lebrijano, 75, Spanish flamenco singer
- July 24 – Horacio Olivo, 83, Puerto Rican actor and singer.
- August 5 – Vander Lee, 50, Brazilian singer-songwriter.
- August 6 – Guillermo Anderson, 54, Honduran musician, thyroid cancer.
- August 7 – Dolores Vargas, 80, Spanish singer, complications of leukemia.
- August 19 – Horacio Salgán, 100, Argentine tango musician.
- August 28 – Juan Gabriel, 66, Mexican singer-songwriter.
- September 11 – Jorge "El Cura" Fernández, Mexican singer
- September 12 – Tavin Pumarejo, 84, Puerto Rican actor, comedian and jíbaro singer.
- September 23 – Leonardo Acosta, 83, Cuban musicologist
- September 29 – Raúl Garello, 80, Argentine bandoneon, music director, composer and arranger
- October 9 – Quique Lucca, 103, Puerto Rican centenarian, founder of La Sonora Ponceña.
- October 27 – Nelson Pinedo, 88, Colombian singer (Sonora Matancera).
- October 28 – Ramón "Chunky" Sánchez, Chicano musician and frontman of Los Alacranes
- December 13 – Betsy Pecanins, 62, American-born Mexican singer, songwriter and record producer, stroke.
- December 18 – Gustavo Quintero, 76, Colombian singer-songwriter
- December 19 – DJ Jinx Paul, 39, traffic collision
