= Yango =

Yango may refer to:

== People ==
- Jeannette Yango (born 1993), Cameroon footballer
- Abraham Yango (born 1996), Liberian-born Australian footballer
- Guillaume Yango (born 1982), French basketball player
- André Kimbuta Yango (born 1954), Congolese politician
- Yango Simantiri (1940–2007), footballer for both Greece and Israel

== Other uses ==
- Yango language or Monzombo, an Ubangian language of the Congos
- Yango (ride sharing), a ride-hailing, delivery and e-grocery service

== See also ==
- Yango-Asker, Narimanovsky District, Astrakhan Oblast, Russia
- Yangon, Myanmar, formerly known as Rangoon
- Yangos, a Brazilian instrumental quartet
