= Homenaje a La Gran Señora =

Studio album by Natalia Jiménez
- Released: December 9, 2016
- Recorded: 2016
- Genre: Latin pop; mariachi
- Length: 44:48
- Language: Spanish
- Label: Sony Music Latin
- Producer: Pepe Garza (executive), Edgar Barrera

Natalia Jiménez chronology
Creo en Mí (2014)	Homenaje a La Gran Señora (2016)

Homenaje a La Gran Señora (Homage to The Great Lady) is the third studio album released by Spanish singer Natalia Jiménez on December 9, 2016, by Sony Music Latin.

Homenaje a La Gran Señora is a tribute album that consists of twelve cover versions of songs released by the late American singer-songwriter Jenni Rivera, with the album having a mixture of Latin pop and mariachi. The album was produced by Pepe Garza and Edgar Barrera.

Homenaje a La Gran Señora reached number two on the Billboard Top Latin Albums chart in the United States.

== Background ==
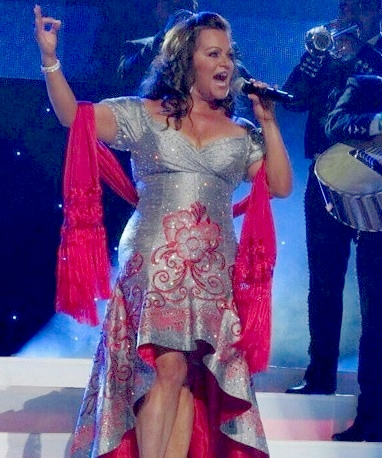
Homenaje a La Gran Señora is a tribute album to Jenni Rivera (pictured 2012)

American singer-songwriter Jenni Rivera was killed in a plane crash on December 9, 2012, while traveling to Mexico City to film for La Voz... México. The album's release marks four years since Rivera's death. Jiménez told the Associated Press, that her and Rivera were planning to record an album and embark on a tour. She also stated, "Although many of these songs have also been recorded by many other singers, I feel that many of these songs were famous thanks to Jenni." Jimenez told Univision's Despierta América, that she has been wanting to record a mariachi/ranchera album and she wanted to do something with Rivera's music because she liked it a lot. The title of the recording is a reference to Rivera's honorary title "The Great Lady" ("La Gran Señora").

== Recordings and covers ==
The album was produced by Pepe Garza, Edgar Barrera, and Aaron Sterling, who also played the drums. The album covers twelve of Rivera's most recognized works such as, "Ya Lo Sé", "De Contrabando", "Por Qué No Le Calas", "No Llega El Olvido", "Inolvidable", and "Tu Camisa Puesta". "Chuper Amigos" features a duet with her Rivera's brother, Lupillo Rivera, meanwhile "Ovarios", features a duet with Rivera's daughter, Chiquis Rivera. Some songs were originally released by other artists, then released by Rivera and some are written by Rivera herself.

== Promotion ==
On December 1, 2016, Jiménez announced the release of the album on Instagram, posting a teaser of "Ya Lo Sé". Jiménez confirmed to Billboard magazine that she will embark on a tour to promote the album.

== Track listing ==
No.	Title	Writer(s)	Length
1.	"Ya Lo Sé"	Pepe Garza	3:40
2.	"De Contrabando"	Joan Sebastian	3:05
3.	"Amiga Si Lo Ves"	Yaredt Elena Leon	4:18
4.	"Por Qué No Le Calas"	Agustin Cejudo Moreno	4:07
5.	"La Misma Gran Señora"	Homero Aguilar Cabrera	3:35
6.	"Chuper Amigos" (featuring Lupillo Rivera)	Jenni Rivera	3:25
7.	"Mírame"	Bruno Danzza, Ignacio Morales Pamanes	3:42
8.	"No Llega el Olvido"	Espinoza Paz	3:46
9.	"Tu Camisa Puesta"	Jenni Rivera	3:58
10.	"Inolvidable"	Espinoza Paz	3:43
11.	"Querida Socia"	Manuel Eduardo Toscano	4:09
12.	"Ovarios" (featuring Chiquis Rivera)	Jenni Rivera	3:24

== Personnel ==
Adapted from the album liner notes.

- Aaron Sterling – drums
- Rodrigo Cárdena – bass guitar
- Edgar Barrera – bass guitar
- Jose Favela – bass guitar
- Dan Warner – electric guitar
- Edgar Barrera – piano
- Giancarlo Alfanno – piano
- Luis Barrera Jr – percussion
- Agústin Rocha – accordion
- Josué Eduardo López – violin
- Adrian Vaca – violin
- Fernando Ortiz – trumpet
- Sergio Iribe – trumpet
- Natalia Jiménez – vocals
- Lupillo Rivera – vocals
- Chiquis Rivera – vocals

== Charts ==
=== Weekly charts ===
Chart (2016)	Peak position
US Top Latin Albums (Billboard)	2
US Latin Pop Albums (Billboard)	2

=== Year-end charts ===
Chart (2017)	Position
US Top Latin Albums (Billboard)	89

== Release history ==
Regions	Dates	Format(s)	Label(s)
United States	December 9, 2016	CD, digital download	Sony Music Latin

== See also ==
- 2016 in Latin music
