= Casa Francisco =

Studio album by Francisco, el Hombre
- Released: October 21, 2021
- Studios: LAB Sound in Piracicaba, São Paulo
- Genres: Latin music, MPB, punk rock, rock
- Length: 29:58
- Languages: Portuguese, Spanish
- Label: ONErpm
- Producers: Francisco, el Hombre; Mateo Piracés Ugarte

Francisco, el Hombre chronology
Rasgacabeza (2019)	Casa Francisco (2021)

Singles from Casa Francisco
- 1. "Nada Conterá a Primavera" Released: 23 September 2021; 2. "Olha a Chuva" Released: 30 September 2021; 3. "Se Não Fosse Por Ontem" Released: 7 October 2021

Casa Francisco is the third album by Brazilian band Francisco, el Hombre, released on 21 October 2021. It is their first album with bassist Helena Papini.

The album was created during a period of isolation of the members in a yellow house (the Sítio Romã, roughly translated as "Pomegranate Ranch") in Araçoiaba da Serra, and part of its production was streamed as in a reality show throughout October 2021. The idea was turning the production process into an "anti-spectacle". The band considers it "the most Francisco, el Hombre album of all", hence the inclusion of a reference to their name in the title.

The quintet compared it with their first album La Pachanga!, seeing it as more "mature" and saying that their debut was about announcing that they were "setting off to the world" and Casa Francisco was about announcing their return to home.

== Background and promotion ==
The album came after a period in which members invested in solo projects (Sebastianismos, by Sebastián Piracés-Ugarte; Lazúli, by Juliana Strassacapa; and Baby, by Mateo Piracés-Ugarte). Part of the songs had already been written for some time, but the group wouldn't feel ready to release them; a total of 50-60 songs were created.

The effort was financed with help from a grant by the São Paulo City Hall.

The first single to be released was "Nada Conterá a Primavera", which mixes rhythms of salsa, mambo and Latin jazz and references MST. The second single, "Olha a Chuva", came out on 30 September, featuring Dona Onete. The song was written in five minutes in an otherwise unproductive day in which a sudden rain caused the band to rush to take their clothes off the washing line. The idea of inviting Dona Onete came from the fact that she was born in Marajó Island, in which it rains every day.

The third single, "Se Nâo Fosse Por Ontem", features Rubel and speaks about the "hardships humanity has to go through in order to get here". The short track "Pele Velha", which reprises part of "Loucura", would originally close the album, but became an interlude. "Ocê" is a tribute to Andrei Martinez Kozyreff's lover.

== Critical reception ==
Professional ratings
Review scores
Source	Rating
Tenho Mais Discos Que Amigos!	positive

Tony Aiex, from Tenho Mais Discos Que Amigos!, considered that, in the album, the genres with which Francisco, el Hombre, works "were fused in an uniform and linear way in order to disclose the band's unique sound, an identity which has never been in such good shape."

== Track listing ==
All tracks are written by Juliana Strassacapa, Sebastian Piracés Ugarte, Andrei Martinez Kozyreff and Mateo Piracés Ugarte

Casa Francisco tracks
No.	Title	Length
1.	"Loucura" (Craziness)	4:16
2.	"Coração Acorda" ((The) Heart Awakens; featuring Josyara)	2:39
3.	"Ocê" (U (Note: "Ocê" is a more informal way of saying "você" (you); it also sounds like "o C" (the [letter] C).))	2:58
4.	"Olha a Chuva" (Look at the Rain; featuring Dona Onete)	3:20
5.	"Pele Velha" (Old Skin)	0:53
6.	"Arbolito" (Little Tree)	3:16
7.	"Se Não Fosse por Ontem" (If It Weren't for Yesterday; featuring Rubel)	3:28
8.	"Arrasta" (Drag (it); featuring Céu)	2:32
9.	"Solo Muere El Que Se Olvida" (Only dies who is forgotten; featuring La Pegatina)	2:39
10.	"Nada Conterá a Primavera" (Nothing Will Contain Spring)	3:57
Total length:		29:58

== Personnel ==
Francisco, el Hombre

- Mateo Piracés Ugarte — vocals, acoustic guitar, Pro Tools
- Sebastián Piracés Ugarte — vocals, drums
- Juliana Strassacapa — vocals, percussion
- Andrei Martinez Kozyreff — guitar
- Helena Papini — bass

Guest/session musicians

- Josyara — vocals
- Dona Onete — vocals
- Rubel — vocals
- Céu — vocals
- Isabella Salvego de Souza — ukulele
- Maicon Faquim Araki — percussion
- Giovani Alves Loner — trombone
- Douglas William Rodrigues dos Santos — trumpet
- Mariana Marinelli de Oliveira — saxophone, transversal flute
- Max Matta — Pro Tools

Technical personnel

- Mateo Piracés Ugarte — editing
- Max Matta — recording technician and editing
- Caíque Neri Chaves — brass/wind recording technician at Estúdio Toca do Ouriço
- Pedro Garcia — mixing
- Carlos Freitas (ClassicMaster) — mastering
- Helena Papini, Juliana Strassacapa, Sebastian Piracés Ugarte, Andrei Martinez Kozyreff, Mateo Piracés Ugarte, Giovani Loner — arrangements
