= Amazônia Groove =

2018 Brazilian documentary film

- Promotional release poster
- Directed by: Bruno Murtinho
- Written by: Leonardo Gudel; Bruno Murtinho
- Produced by: Leonardo Edde
- Starring: Dona Onete; Manoel Cordeiro; Sebastião Tapajós; Albery Albuquerque; Mestre Damasceno; Waldo Squash; Paulo André Barata; MG Calibre; Gina Lobrista
- Cinematography: Jacques Cheuiche
- Production company: Urca Filmes
- Distributed by: Pagu Pictures
- Release dates: November 2018 (Festival do Rio); 6 June 2019 (Brazil)
- Running time: 85 minutes
- Country: Brazil
- Language: Portuguese

Amazônia Groove is a 2018 Brazilian documentary film about the music of northern Brazil and the Amazon region of South America. Directed and co-written by Bruno Murtinho, the film premiered at the Rio de Janeiro International Film Festival (Festival do Rio) in November 2018. It was released theatrically in Brazil on 6 June 2019.

== Synopsis ==
Amazônia Groove showcases musicians living in northern Brazil—including the state of Pará—in and around the region known as the Amazon basin, in South America. Among the musicians featured are singer and composer Dona Onete; rapper MG Caliber; guitarist Manoel Cordeiro; singer-songwriter Mestre Damasceno; singer Gina Lobrista; DJ and musician Waldo Squash; and guitarist Sebastião Tapajós.

== Production ==
According to director Bruno Murtinho, Amazônia Groove was conceived by a South American music producer who sent Murtinho MP3 files of music originating from the Amazon region. A fan of music videos produced by Murtinho, the music producer suggested that Murtinho write and direct a documentary about musicians in and around Brazil.

== Release and reception ==
Amazônia Groove had its premiere at the Rio de Janeiro International Film Festival (Festival do Rio) in November 2018. In March 2019, it screened at the South by Southwest Film Festival in Austin, Texas, United States, where it won the ZEISS Cinematography Award.

Amazônia Groove received a theatrical release in Brazil on 6 June 2019.

Sérgio Alpendre of Folha de S.Paulo gave the film a score of three out of five stars. Michael King of The Austin Chronicle commended the range of genres showcased in the film; he wrote that, "the various performances are brief but often magical," and that Murtinho's "vivid recapitulation of a few evocative musical genres of the region inevitably leaves a viewer thirsting for more."
