= No Lo Había Dicho =

Studio album by Pepe Aguilar
- Released: June 27, 2016
- Recorded: 2015–16 at the: Audito Studios in Los Angeles; Neo Audio Studios in Mexico City; Studio@Sarras Deli in Mexico City; Village Studios in Los Angeles
- Genre: Pop rock; Latin pop
- Length: 40:00
- Language: Spanish
- Label: Equinoccio; Sony
- Producer: Pepe Aguilar; Yamil Rezc; Francisco Durán; Mauricio Durán

Pepe Aguilar chronology
Interpreta a Joan Sebastian (2015)	No Lo Había Dicho (2016)	Fue Un Placer Conocerte: Gracias Juan Gabriel, Vol. 1 (2019)

Singles from No Lo Había Dicho
- 1. "María" Released: February 12, 2016; 2. "Cuestión de Esperar" Released: June 22, 2016

No Lo Había Dicho (I Hadn't Said It) is the twenty-sixth studio album by Mexican-American singer-songwriter Pepe Aguilar on June 27, 2016 by Equinoccio Records and distributed by Sony Music. It was produced by Yamil Rezc, Francisco Durán, Mauricio Durán, and Aguilar.

No Lo Había Dicho reached number three on the Billboard Top Latin Albums chart and number one on the Billboard Latin Pop Albums chart in the United States. It peaked at number 33 on Mexico Top 100 chart and was certified gold in Mexico. Thom Jurek of Allmusic gave the album a positive review and called the performances "flawless".

Two singles were released from the album: "María" and "Cuestión de Esperar". "María" debuted at number one on the Mexican pop chart and "Cuestión de Esperar" was nominated for Record of the Year at the 17th Annual Latin Grammy Awards in 2016.

== Background ==
Although Pepe Aguilar's discography has been dominated by ranchera and banda styles of Mexican music, he was no stranger to trying new things. Aguilar has recorded a few pop/rock songs throughout his career. Songwriter Enrique Guzman Yanez, also credited as, "Fato", has previously worked with Aguilar experimenting outside of regional Mexican music, specifically his 2004 album No Soy de Nadie and his 2011 EP, Negociaré con la pena. Guzman wrote or co-wrote six out of the ten songs on the album, including the two lead singles.

== Reception ==
Professional ratings
Review scores
Source	Rating
AllMusic	4/5 stars

Thom Jurek of Allmusic gave the album four stars; he described it as "wildly ambitious" and "flawless". He praised the singing, the songwriting, and the instrumentation of the album. "Cuestión de Esperar" was nominated for Record of the Year at the 17th Annual Latin Grammy Awards in 2016.

== Commercial release ==
=== Album ===
The recording debuted at number 45 on the Asociación Mexicana de Productores de Fonogramas y Videogramas Mexican Album Chart in June 2016 and peaked at number 33 a few weeks later. No Lo Había Dicho was certified gold in Mexico for sales of 30,000 units. On July 9, 2016, the album debuted at number three on the Billboard Top Latin Albums chart and number one on the Billboard Latin Pop Albums chart in the United States.

=== Singles ===
On February 12, 2016, "María" was released in Mexico and United States as the lead single from the album. It peaked at number one on the Mexican pop singles chart. On June 22, 2016, "Cuestión de Esperar", was released as the second single from the album.

== Track listing ==
No.	Title	Writer(s)	Length
1.	"Jamás Me Fui"	Enrique Guzmán Yáñez	4:01
2.	"Lo Que Siente un Corazón (Maldito Amor)"	José Antonio Aguilar Jiménez and Francisco Durán	4:25
3.	"Mi Lindo Pueblo"	Enrique Guzmán Yáñez	3:45
4.	"Cuestión de Esperar"	Enrique Guzmán Yáñez	4:52
5.	"Volver a Mi Casa"	Felipe Botello	3:53
6.	"María"	Mark Tovar and Enrique Guzmán Yáñez	3:33
7.	"Y Tú y Tú"	Enrique Guzmán Yáñez	4:06
8.	"Punto Final"	José Antonio Aguilar Jiménez and Francisco Durán	4:46
9.	"Pa' Que Te Convenzas"	José Antonio Aguilar Jiménez and Francisco Durán	4:36
10.	"No Lo Había Dicho"	Enrique Guzmán Yáñez	6:03
Total length:			44:00

== Charts ==
Chart (2016)	Peak position
Mexico (Top 100 Mexico)	33
US Top Latin Albums (Billboard)	3
US Latin Pop Albums (Billboard)	1

== Certifications ==
Region	Certification	Certified units/sales
Mexico (AMPROFON)	Gold	30,000^{^}
^{^} Shipments figures based on certification alone.

== See also ==
- 2016 in Latin music
