= Rasgacabeza =

Studio album by Francisco, el Hombre
- Released: March 15, 2019
- Length: 26:52
- Language: Portuguese, Spanish
- Label: Independent

Francisco, el Hombre chronology
Soltasbruxa (2016)	Rasgacabeza (2019)	Casa Francisco (2021)

Singles from RASGACABEZA
- 1. "O TEMPO É SUA MORADA :: celebrar" Released: 2 November 2018; 2. "CHAMA ADRENALINA :: gasolina" Released: 13 February 2019

Rasgacabeza (stylized as RASGACABEZA) is the second album by Brazilian band Francisco, el Hombre, released on 15 March 2019. It features Capilé e DBL.

The videos for "O Tempo é Sua Morada" and "Chama Adrenalina" were released in November 2018 and February 2019, respectively. According to the band, all of the album's songs would receive videos.

It is the last album featuring Rafael Gomes on bass.

== Background and composition ==
The album marks a shift in the band's sound. About this change and the need for it, they said it was "a different album from the others. It accumulates all the things we felt last year to turn the attitude we want to have in 2019. In RASGACABEZA ideia is fuel, moment is spark and attitude is fire."

One of the sources of inspiration for the change was producer Carlos Eduardo Miranda, who, according to the band, though their previous album Soltasbruxa was "afraid to be bold". He asked the band not to be afraid to dare on their next album. Following his death, the band decided to self-produce it and follow his advice.

The band, which always liked to make political commentary in their songs, saw an opportunity to address their frustrations and anxieties in the Brazilian 2018 election and the country's steering towards conservative values. According to them, the album is "a total breakup with the predecessor because we need the breakup to grow. We need to re-think our methods in order not to stay stuck in the past."

In the beginning, the album was done in several places amidst their debut album's tour, which included Chile, Goiânia and even a plane trip. Then, the band created the album in their studio. Besides that, in order to give the work an industrial tone, the band sampled instruments from videos with very few views on YouTube.

== Song information ==
"O Tempo é sua Morada", the first song to be released, was based on their experiences on the Day of the Dead in Mexico, and works as a celebration and a farewell to Soltasbruxa.

"Chão Teto Parede" criticizes Brazil's situation around the time of the album. Its electronic elements and the idea that everything is on fire are meant to encourage the listener to take action.

== Track listing ==
Rasgacabeza track listing
No.	Title	Length
1.	"CHAMA ADRENALINA :: gasolina" ("CHAMA ADRENALINA" can mean "[IT] CALLS ADRENALINE", "[IT] CALLS FOR ADRENALINE" or "[IT IS] CALLED ADRENALINE"; "gasolina" means "gasoline".)	2:31
2.	"CHÃO TETO PAREDE :: pegando fogo" (FLOOR CEILING WALL :: on fire; featuring Capilé)	3:43
3.	"TRAVOU :: tela azul" ([IT] FROZE :: blue screen)	2:11
4.	"ENCALDEIRANDO :: aqui dentro tá quente" (BOILERING :: it's hot in here; featuring DBL)	3:30
5.	"PARAFUSO SOLTO :: ponto morto" (LOOSE SCREW :: neutral)	4:02
6.	"O TEMPO É SUA MORADA :: celebrar" (TIME IS YOUR RESIDENCE :: celebrate)	3:50
7.	"MANDA BALA FOGO :: não preciso de você" (SHOOT FIRE :: [I] don't need you)	3:21
8.	"SE HOJE TÁ ASSIM :: imagina o amanhã" (If Today Is Like This :: imagine tomorrow)	3:44
Total length:		26:52
