= Amiga (album) =

Studio album by Álex Anwandter
- Released: April 8, 2016
- Recorded: 2015–16
- Genre: Latin alternative, pop rock
- Length: 41:48
- Language: Spanish
- Label: Nacional Records

Álex Anwandter chronology
Álex & Daniel (2013)	Amiga (2016)	Latinoamericana (2018)

Singles from Amiga
- 1. "Siempre Es Viernes En Mi Corazón" Released: January 27, 2016

Amiga (English: Female friend or English: Girl friend) is the third solo studio album by Chilean Latin alternative singer Álex Anwandter. It was released through Nacional Records on April 8, 2016. The album peaked at number eighteen on the United States Billboard Latin Pop Albums chart; his first entry on a national music chart. It won the Pulsar Award for Album of the Year.

== Background ==
The lead single "Siempre Es Viernes En Mi Corazón" was released on January 27, 2016. Judy Cantor-Navas of Billboard called Anwandter's songs as being a combination of "a feeling of almost giddy abandon with sobering social themes." She called the song as being a "dual spirit" to his 2011 single "Cómo Puedes Vivir Contigo Mismo", which became a gay anthem for young LGBT people who faced discrimination in his home country of Chile. In a Billboard interview, Anwandter explained that the track drew inspiration from alienation: "the product of non-stop work and living in what is sometimes an oppressive society" and called the song a dance pop recording that "both ignores and embraces those feelings [of alienation]." The song also features vocals from Argentine electropop band Miranda!.

MTV.com called the album "goregous" and called it to be "more lyrically up front than its predecessor". MTV found the lead single to deal with societal issues such as negative attitudes of homosexuality and Roman Catholicism and "deeper truths" on the working life in Chile. The track "Manifiesto" is a "heavy, romantic piano ballad" and finds the singer declaring himself as a woman who becomes the "village fag" in the eyes of his community. The song is a tongue-in-cheek title of manifesto that does not have any political stance.

== Track listing ==
1. "Siempre Es Viernes en Mi Corazón"
2. "Cordillera"
3. "Traición"
4. "Amiga"
5. "Mujer"
6. "Manifiesto"
7. "Intentarlo Todo de Nuevo"
8. "El Sonido de los Corazones Que Se Quiebran"
9. "Caminando a la Fábrica"
10. "Qué Será de Ti Mañana?"
11. "Te Enamoraste"

== Charts ==
Chart (2016)	Peak position
US Latin Pop Albums (Billboard)	18

== See also ==
- 2016 in Latin music
- Latin American music in the United States
