= Besos y Copas Desde Hollywood =

Live album by Jenni Rivera
- Released: September 12, 2006
- Recorded: 2005
- Genres: Regional Mexican, Latin pop
- Label: Fonovisa
- Producer: Jenni Rivera

Jenni Rivera chronology
En Vivo Desde Hollywood (2006)	Besos y Copas Desde Hollywood (2006)	Mi vida Loca (2007)

Professional ratings
Review scores
Source	Rating
Allmusic	4.5/5 stars

Besos y Copas Desde Hollywood is a live album released by Regional Mexican singer Jenni Rivera on September 12, 2006. It was recorded in Los Angeles, California.

== Track listing ==
1. Por un Amor/Cucurrucucu Paloma
2. Juro Que Nunca Volvere
3. Querida Socia
4. Soy Madre Soltera (Madre Soltera)
5. La Tequilera
6. Homenaje a Mi Madre
7. Cuando Yo Queria Ser Grande
8. Las Mismas Costumbres
9. Amiga Si Lo Ves
10. Que Se Te Olvido
11. Que Me Vas a Dar
12. Besos y Copas
13. Mil Heridas

== Chart performance ==
Chart (2006)	Peak position
US Billboard Top Latin Albums	19
US Billboard Regional Mexican Albums	5
