= Soltasbruxa =

Studio album by Francisco, el Hombre
- Released: September 2, 2016
- Genre: Latin music, MPB, rock, carnival marchinha
- Length: 38:18
- Label: Independent
- Producer: Zé Nigro and Francisco, el Hombre from December 2015 to July 2016 at Estúdio Navegantes in São Paulo, São Paulo

Francisco, el Hombre chronology
La Pachanga! (2015)	Soltasbruxa (2016)	'Rasgacabeza' (2019)

Singles from Soltasbruxa
- 1. "Calor da Rua" Released: 6 June 2016

Soltasbruxa (stilized as SOLTASBRUXA or #SOLTASBRUXA, can be translated as "Lethewitchesout") is the debut album by Brazilian band Francisco, el Hombre, released 2 September 2016. It was almost entirely produced by Zé Nigro and the band itself at Estúdio Navegantes in São Paulo, São Paulo. The single "Calor da Rua" was produced by Curumin, who introduced the band to Nigro. The album features guest performances of Liniker and Apanhador Só.

The album release party was held at Audio, in São Paulo, at a show with Argentinian band Onda Vaga. the album features lyrics with political and social commentary, besides a more rock-oriented instrumentation compared to the folk of La Pachanga!. The band intends to release it as CD and vinyl eventually.

== Concept and composition ==
About the shift in the lyrical themes in comparison with 2015's La Pachanga! EP, vocalist and percussion Sebastián Piracés-Ugarte says:

La Pachanga! paints this image that we are a cute, dancing, almost inoffensive band, you know? And we're far from it. Actually, we are much more than that. We are exploring the plurality of what we are and observe in society. It's intense, aggressive, angry and sad. honestly, I think nobody expect we follow that path. Instead of attempting to give it a timeless look, we decided to face the now. And politics is part of who we are, but on La Pachanga! it was kept hidden. We consider ourselves to be left-wingers and we don't agree with much of what PT has done. However, in light of the right-wing moves, one can't be condescending, specially regarding the Impeachment.

Vocalist and percussionist Juliana Strassacapa echoed such words in another interview. Vocalist, acoustic guitarist and Sebastián's brother, Mateo, also said:

[...] if we are to make an album, let's imagine that it is a final album. Let's pretend it is the last album. Not because we are going to end the band afterwards, but because, if there's no tomorrow, what do we want to represent? What did we live? What do we want to feel if, in a road, an oncoming truck hits us, we die... what do we have here?

For the members, there has always been an intention by the band of expressing messages with a political view, but they still hadn't found a way nor a moment for it. About the album title, Mateo said "we have a political thing, we are Third World, we are born losing, but we are born to shot, that's why the album is called Soltasbruxa, we want people to explode during the show, not just to have fun". In another interview, he added:

There's also this quote, by Eduardo Galeano in Open Veins of Latin America, in which he says international division of labor consists of some countries specializing in winning and other specializing in losing. We are Latin America, we specialized in losing. In handing our every richness for them to process our richness, in having an absurd external debt, you name it... we specialized in losing, so, somebody has to specialize in shouting. The album somehow is a shout. That's why it's SOLTASBRUXA. In the show, I don't want people to dance and get happy. I want people to explode, to set themselves free..

Some of the songs were created from zero by all members together, like "Triste, Louca ou Má", "Bolso Nada" and "Tá Com Dólar, Tá Com Deus". The majority of them is totally sung in Portuguese, except for "Como una Flor", "Primavera" and "Sincero", with Spanish-language sections. When asked about the reason to focus on the Portuguese language,Mateo explained:

Our biggest audience is in Brazil and I want to be understood. Singing in Spanish was a contesting to the imperialistic logic of singing in English in our continent. [...] However, even Spanish did not expressed the message we wanted to convey when we sung by the Mamanguape River, in Paraíba, to a group of fishermen. Or to a family in the countryside of Joinville who invited us to their birthday. Or to the people who were passing by the soundcheck in a festival in Uberlândia.

For a future vinyl release, the band already released Soltasbruxa divided in A and B sides at SoundCloud. According to Sebastián, the division was made so that the album had "a tight, heavy, dense start, which transforms into something lighter as we naturalize what we learn, but with a strong ending to remind us that there is still much for us to learn".

== Song information ==
Some tracks deal with topics related to feminism, like the single "Calor da Rua", which talks about the domestic violence deep-rooted in society; and "Triste, Louca ou Má", which questions the roles of women in society and features Salma Jô (Carne Doce), Helena Macedo, Larissa Baq and Renata Éssis. Strassacapa, the group's only woman, said that, with this line-up, "it is necessary to bring to our everyday discussions about sexism and gender violence". Both received promotional videos. "Triste, Louca ou Má" was featured at the soundtrack of Rede Globo's telenovela O Outro Lado do Paraíso, being used as the ending theme for the second episode, in which protagonist Clara (Bianca Bin) is raped by her own husband Gael (Sérgio Guizé) in their first night as a married couple. The song was nominated for the 2017 Latin Grammy Award for Best Portuguese Language Song.

"Bolso Nada", featuring Liniker e os Caramelows, criticizes congressman Jair Bolsonaro, without citing him explicitly. Less specifically speaking, the band intend to criticize "these politicians who think that a good criminal is a dead criminal (Note: The idiom "[a] good criminal is [a] dead criminal" is a common idea defended by Brazilian people in favor of capital punishment.) and that there is a gay cure".

"Tá Com Dólar, Tá Com Deus" is a satire of the "aggregated everyday values". In a carnival marchinha rhythm, the track deals with the economical crisis Brazil was facing by the time of the album release and the "devaluing of life next to the money valuing". The song features the band Apanhador Só, which the quintet hosted in Campinas during a tour. According to Sebastián, the track was composed in less than 30 minutes based on a chorus they already sung in early 2015 rehearsals.

== Track listing ==
No.	Title	Length
1.	"Soltasbruxa (Note: Soltasbruxa is a combination of the words "solta as bruxas", which can be translated as "Let the Witches Out".)" (featuring Salma Jô e Rodrigo Qowasi)	1:41
2.	"Calor da Rua" (Street Heat)	3:21
3.	"Bolso Nada (Note: Literally "Pocket Nothing", an intentional alternate spelling of "Bolsonaro", the name of the aforementioned congressman)" (featuring Liniker e os Caramelows)	4:26
4.	"Primavera" (Spring)	3:34
5.	"Não Vou Descansar" (I Won't Rest)	1:16
6.	"Triste, Louca ou Má" (Sad, Crazy or Bad (featuring Salma Jô, Helena Macedo, Larissa Baq e Renata Éssis))	4:25
7.	"..."	0:52
8.	"Tá Com Dólar, Tá Com Deus (Note: Literally "If You've Got Dollar[s], You're With God". It is an adaptation of the Brazilian expression "Tá Comigo, Tá Com Deus", which translates as "If You're With Me, You're With God", which is another way of saying "You Can Trust Me".)" (com Apanhador Só))	2:51
9.	"Como Una Flor" (Like a Flower)	3:59
10.	"Sincero" (Sincere)	4:02
11.	"Lobolobolobo!" (Wolfwolfwolf!)	0:25
12.	"Axé e Auê Sem Fuzuê" (Axé and Confusion Without Mayhem)	3:59
13.	"Muro em Branco" (Unwritten Wall)	3:21
Total length:		38:18

== Personnel ==
Francisco, el Hombre

- Sebastián Piracés-Ugarte – vocals, percussion and acoustic guitar
- Mateo Piracés-Ugarte – vocals and acoustic guitar
- Juliana Strassacapa – vocals and percussion
- Andrei Martinez Kozyreff – guitar
- Rafael Gomes – bass, backing vocals

Session musician

- Giovani Loner, Danilo Ciolfi, Anderson Menezes – wind instruments

Technical personnel

- Zé Nigro and Francisco, el Hombre – production
- Gustavo Lenza – mixing
- Felipe Tichauer – mastering
- Curumin – production on "Calor da Rua"
- Fernando Narcizo – mixing on "Calor da Rua"
- Amanda Paschoal – art
