= Francisco, el Hombre =

Brazilian rock/Latin music/MPB band

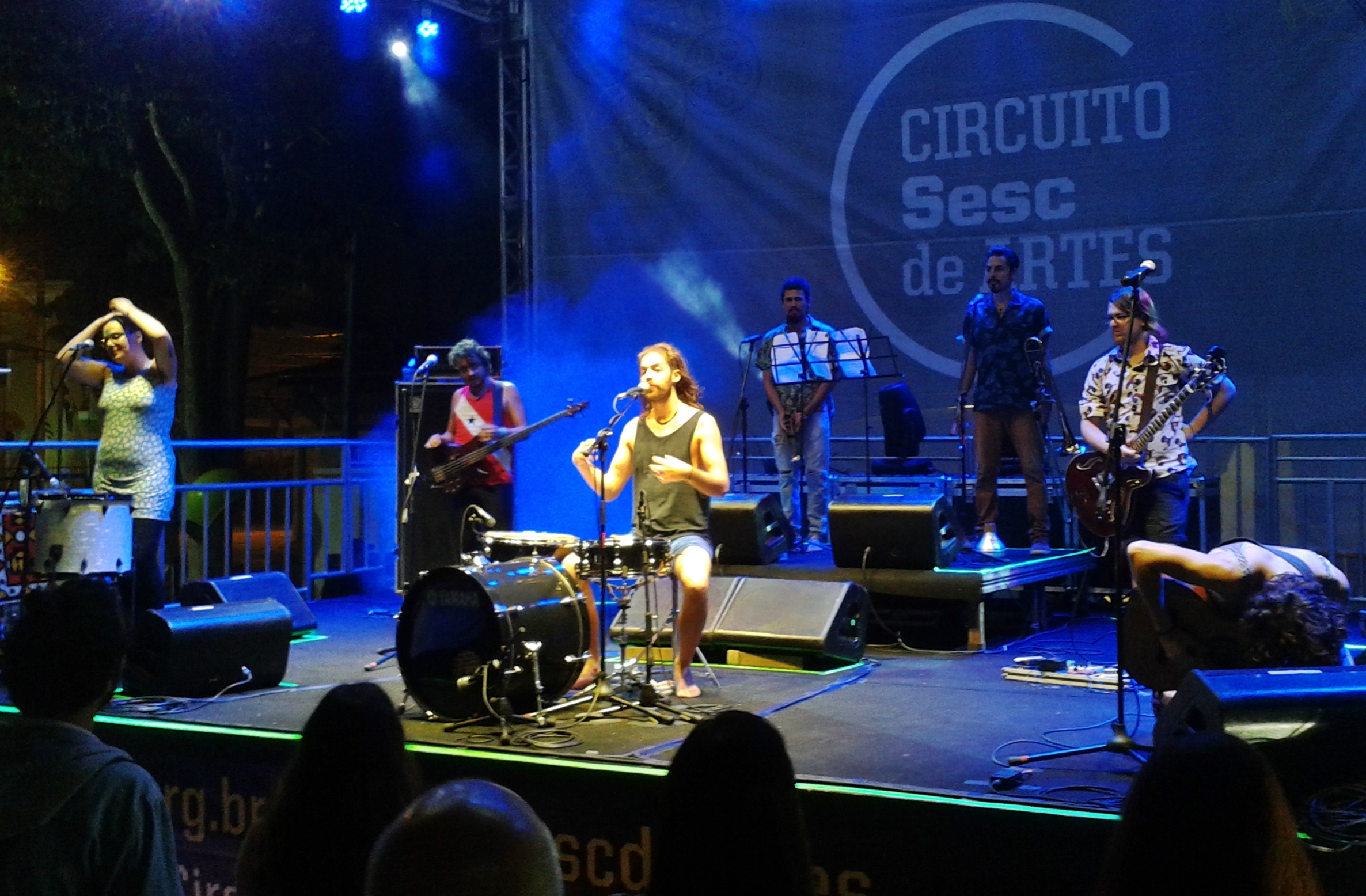
- Francisco, el Hombre, live in Cotia in April 2016. From left to right: Juliana Strassacapa, Rafael Gomes, Sebastián Piracés-Ugarte, two unknown touring musicians, Andrei Martinez Kozyreff and Mateo Piracés-Ugarte.

Background information
- Origin: Campinas, São Paulo
- Genres: Pop rock, Mexican music, folk music, MPB
- Years active: 2013–present
- Label: Independent
- Members: Sebastián Piracés-Ugarte; Mateo Piracés-Ugarte; Andrei Martinez Kozyreff; Juliana Strassacapa; Helena Papini
- Past members: Rafael Gomes; Erin O'Connor; Victor V-B
- Website: www.facebook.com/franciscoelhombreOFICIAL

Francisco, el Hombre is a Brazilian rock, Mexican, Brazilian and Latin American music band formed in 2013 by Mexican-born Brazilian brothers Sebastián and Mateo Piracés-Ugarte in the city of Campinas, São Paulo.

With three other Brazilian-born members, the group mixes musical elements from both countries and others from Latin America, based on continental trips by the brothers, resulting in music sung in Spanish, Portuguese and English. They are self-defined as a "pachanga folk" band. Rolling Stone Brasil described them as a mixture of Manu Chao and Nação Zumbi.

Their initial Latin American tours were self-financed, improvised, and often began with few scheduled shows. They performed in streets, hostels, bars and at birthday parties.

Their 2017 song "Triste, Louca ou Má" (Sad, Crazy or Bad) was nominated for the 2017 Latin Grammy award for Best Portuguese Language Song.

== History ==
After traveling around the world with their instruments, Mexican brothers Sebastián and Mateo Piracés-Ugarte moved to Brazil in the mid-2000s, naturalized themselves, and settled in the district of Barão Geraldo in Campinas, São Paulo. The band was formed with the objective of "quitting jobs, college and every 'bond with society'". The name of the group was inspired by a figure of the same name of Colombian folklore, known for his street performances with the accordion.

By 2015, the group had completed two South-America tours, the second being called "Mochilazo" In the beginning of that year, after a show in Mendoza, Argentina, they were robbed and lost all their belongings, including instruments and documents. They returned to Brazil with funds raised through an online campaign, help from friends and the local community, and public performances with borrowed instruments.

In April 2015, they released their EP La Pachanga!, with six original tracks. The release event took place at the Centro Cultural São Paulo on 7 May, where they also recorded a video for the track "Dicen" (They Say), featuring Chilean singer Francisca Valenzuela in the studio version. According to the founding brothers, the track was created so they could talk to their young nephews about dictatorship. The EP also features a track written completely in Portuguese, "Minha Casa" (My House), which was written in Africa.

In 2016, they started the campaign #VaiPraCuba (#GoToCuba), through which they planned to finance a documentary about culture on the communist island, while on tour in the country to take part in the project "El Sur Suena", at the festival "AMPM – América por Su Música" in Havana. In the middle of that year, they did another Latin America tour.

In June 2016, they released a video for the track "Calor da Rua", produced by Curumin and Zé Nigro, which deals with domestic violence and would be part of their debut album. The album, titled Soltasbruxa, was released on 2 September. It was produced by Zé Nigro and it featured guest performances of Liniker and Apanhador Só, besides political lyrics with social commentary.

In March 2019, they released their second studio album, Rasgacabeza. In June 2020, they used a new single, "Despedida" (Farewell) to announce the departure of bassist Rafael Gomes, who had been with them for 6,5 years. He was replaced in the same year by Helena Papini, a name suggested by Gomes himself.

In October 2021, following a period of isolation, the band released their third studio album, Casa Francisco.

== Members ==
=== Current ===
- Sebastián Piracés-Ugarte – vocals, percussion and acoustic guitar (2013—present)
- Mateo Piracés-Ugarte – vocals and acoustic guitar (2013—present)
- Juliana Strassacapa – vocals and percussion (2013—present)
- Andrei Martinez Kozyreff – guitar (2013—present)
- Helena Papini – bass (2020—present)

=== Former members ===
- Rafael Gomes – bass, backing vocals (2013–2020)
- Erin O'Connor – vocals
- Victor V-B – drums (2013—?)

== Discography ==
=== EPs ===
- Nudez (2013)
- La Pachanga! (2015)

=== Albums ===
- Soltasbruxa (2016)
- Rasgacabeza (2019)
- Casa Francisco (2021)

=== Singles ===
- "Triste, Louca ou Má" (2016)
- "Despedida" (2020)
- 2021 – "Nada Conterá a Primavera"
- 2021 – "Olha a Chuva"
- 2021 – "Se Não Fosse por Ontem"
