= En Vivo Desde Hollywood =

Live album by Jenni Rivera
- Released: April 4, 2006
- Recorded: 2005
- Genre: Regional Mexican
- Label: Fonovisa

Jenni Rivera chronology
Parrandera, Rebelde y Atrevida (2005)	En Vivo Desde Hollywood (2006)	Besos y Copas Desde Hollywood (2006)

En Vivo Desde Hollywood (Eng.: "Live from Hollywood") is a live album by regional Mexican singer Jenni Rivera, released on April 4, 2006. It was recorded in Los Angeles, California.

== Track listing ==
No.	Title	Length
1.	"Parrandera, Rebelde y Atrevida"	03:07
2.	"La Chacalosa"	03:47
3.	"Popurrí: Reyna de Reynas/Rosita Alvírez/Mi Vida Loca"	05:02
4.	"Las Malandrinas"	03:06
5.	"Popurrí: Como Tú Decidas/Cuando Yo Quiera Has de Volver"	02:26
6.	"Popurrí: Wasted Days and Wasted Nights/Angel Baby"	04:12
7.	"Chicana Jalisciense"	02:54
8.	"Se Marchó"	02:37
9.	"Se Las Voy a Dar a Otro"	06:53
10.	"Cuando Abras los Ojos"	05:01
11.	"El Nopal"	06:16
12.	"Popurri: A Escondidas/Hacer él Amor con Otro"	04:57

== Chart performance ==
Chart (2006)	Peak position
US Billboard Top Latin Albums	39
US Billboard Regional Mexican Albums	13
