= Zayda y los Culpables =

- Genres: Regional Mexican, Norteño, Tejano
- Years active: 1996 - 2007
- Labels: Musart Records; Balboa Records

Zayda y los Culpables (English: Zayda and the Guilty Ones) were a regional Mexican band. They were famous for their romantic cumbias and ballads about love and loss. The song "Tiro de Gracia" (Coup de Grâce), describing a failed relationship, was one of their most popular songs. The song "De Contrabando" was first recorded by the band and years later became a hit record for Mexican-American singer Jenni Rivera.

== Death of Zayda Peña Arjona ==
Zayda Peña Arjona (March 5, 1981–December 1, 2007) was the lead singer of Zayda y los Culpables.

Shortly before midnight on December 1, 2007, an unknown gunman shot Peña in the back at Mónaco Motel in Matamoros, Tamaulipas, across the U.S.-Mexico border from Brownsville, Texas. Two other people — Ana Bertha González, a friend of Peña, and Leonardo Sánchez, a motel employee — were also shot. Both died at the scene. Paramedics took Zayda to Alfredo Pumarejo Hospital in Matamoros, where doctors determined that her injuries were not fatal. Physicians placed Peña in emergency surgery in order to remove the bullet.

The next day, several assailants entered the hospital, roaming the corridors. Once they found Zayda, they shot her again in the chest at point blank range to ensure her death. The Dallas Morning News stated that the fatal bullet pierced her back; The Independent and Reuters stated that the fatal bullet hit her face. She was 26 years old.

Her mother, Blanca Aidé Arjona, worked in the office of a public prosecutor, as of 2007.

The death of Peña, who had no known connections to traffickers or any criminal activity, and did not write or perform songs about traffickers, instilled fear and great concern in many Mexican performers.

== Discography ==
All of the albums are under the Discos Musart label.

- Enamorada (1996) (As Zayda y Su Grupo, First album)
- Como Mariposa (1997) (As Zayda y Los Culpables)
- Sola (1998)
- Atrévete (1999)
- Estoy Enamorada (2001) (As only Zayda with mariachi)
- Sensible (2002)
- El Amor es Así (2004)
- Caída Libre (2005) (As only Zayda with mariachi)
- Me Muero Por Estar Contigo (2006) (Last album recorded)

== Greatest hits albums ==
- Como Mariposa (2002)
- Para Enamorados (2004)
- Coleccion de Oro: La Sentimental (2005)
- Recordando a Zayda y Los Culpables (2007)
- Grandes Exitos (2008)
