= El diablo en el cuerpo =

- Digital cover

Studio album by Álex Anwandter
- Released: May 26, 2023
- Studio: 5 AM Studios (New York City)
- Genre: Disco
- Length: 65:22
- Language: Spanish
- Label: 5 AM
- Producer: Álex Anwandter

Álex Anwandter chronology
Latinoamericana (2018)	El diablo en el cuerpo (2023)	Dime Precioso (2024)

Singles from El diablo en el cuerpo
- 1. "Maricoteca" Released: November 9, 2022; 2. "Qué piensas hacer sin mi amor?" Released: February 27, 2023; 3. "Precipicio" Released: March 29, 2023; 4. "Mi vida en llamas" Released: April 24, 2023; 5. "Uno de nosotros" Released: May 5, 2023

The album is a bit abstract, but it's also about the way we communicate with the body. And it's a lot about desire as well and pursuing desire and the effects of pursuing desire and societal norms around pursuing desire. So I think when I'm saying I have the devil in my body, what I'm saying is I want to communicate my desire through my body. And I don't care if that goes against certain social grain or whatever.

— Anwandter on themes on El diablo en el cuerpo

El diablo en el cuerpo (lit. 'The Devil in the Body') is a 2023 studio album by Chilean pop musician Álex Anwandter. The album has received positive reviews from critics.

== Reception ==
Editors at AllMusic rated this album 4 out of 5 stars, with critic Tim Sendra writing that "Anwandter pulls off a neat trick on" this album by "meld[ing] classic sounds from multiple genres and eras into a thoroughly updated take on pop music that's inclusive and just the right mix of sleek and heartfelt". Editors at AllMusic included this on their list of favorite pop albums of 2023, writing that "elements of disco, '80s pop and soft rock, along with a very 2020s anything-goes sonic approach, combine for a thrilling, emotion-packed listening experience". Critics at NPR's All Songs Considered included this on their long list of the best albums of the week. Editors at Teen Vogue included this among the 15 best non-English albums of the year, calling it "the perfect LGBTQ+ disco night soundtrack".

The album was nominated for Best Pop/Rock album at the Latin Grammys, losing to Vida Cotidiana by Colombian musician Juanes.

== Track listing ==
1. "Maricoteca" (lit. 'Queer Club') – 3:43
2. "Qué piensas hacer sin mi amor?" (lit. 'What Will You Do Without My Love?') – 4:08
3. "Precipicio" (lit. 'Precipice') – 4:07
4. "Prediciendo la ruina" (lit. 'Predicting Ruin') – 3:52
5. "Mi vida en llamas" (lit. 'My Life on Fire'; featuring Buscabulla) – 4:49
6. "Unx de nosotrxs" (lit. 'One of Us'; featuring Javiera Mena) – 4:10
7. "Ahora somos dos" (lit. 'Now There are Two of Us') – 3:38
8. "Pueblo fantasma" (lit. 'Ghost Town') – 3:51
9. "Toda la noche" (lit. 'All Night Long') – 4:51
10. "Tienes una idea muy antigua del amor" (lit. 'Your Conception of Love Is So Dated'; featuring Julieta Venegas) – 4:27
11. "Balada de la impunidad" (lit. 'Impunity Ballad') – 2:54
12. "El diablo en el cuerpo" (lit. 'The Devil in the Body') – 3:46
13. "Vamos de nuevo" (lit. 'Let's Go Again') – 4:07
14. "Nuestra vida juntos" (lit. 'Our Life Together') – 4:38
15. "Despertando" (lit. 'Awakening') – 3:29
16. "Tengo una confesión" (lit. 'I Have a Confession'; featuring Christina Rosenvinge) – 4:53

== Personnel ==
- Álex Anwandter – instrumentation, vocals, production
- Buscabulla – vocals on "Mi vida en llamas"
- Javiera Mena – vocals on "Unx de nostrxs"
- Christina Rosenvinge – vocals on "Tengo una confesión"
- Julieta Venegas – duet vocals on "Tienes una idea muy antigua del amor"

== See also ==
- List of 2023 albums
