= Dona Onete =

Brazilian singer and composer (born 1939)

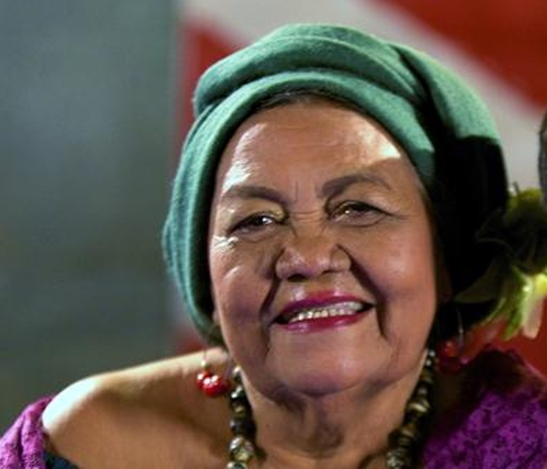

Background information
- Born: Ionete da Silveira Gama; June 18, 1939 (age 87); Cachoeira do Arari, Pará, Brazil
- Genres: Carimbó
- Occupations: Singer, composer

Dona Onete (born June 18, 1939) is a Brazilian singer and composer. She has been referred to as the "Queen of Carimbó".

== Career ==
She was born Ionete da Silveira Gama in Cachoeira do Arari and grew up in Igarapé-Miri. By the time that she was fifteen, she was singing songs from traditional music genres such as sambas, quadrilles and boi bumba. She taught history and Amazonian studies in Igarapé-Mir and conducted research into rhythms, dances and traditions of the region. She helped establish music and dance groups which preserved traditional music and customs. From 1993 to 1996, she served as secretary of culture for the municipality.

Onete recorded her first album Feitiço Caboclo when she was 73. She developed her own hybrid genre of music carimbó chamegado. After she retired to Pedreira, she continued to perform. Together with a local band, she has performed throughout Brazil as well as in the United Kingdom, France, Portugal, Germany and New York City.

In 2013, a biography of Onete Menina Onete - Travessias & Travessuras was published by anthropologist Antônio Maria de Souza Santos and educator Josivana de Castro Rodrigues.

In 2017, she was named to the Brazilian Ordem do Mérito Cultural.

In 2018, Onete appeared in the documentary film Amazônia Groove.

Her album Rebujo was considered one of the 25 best Brazilian albums of the first half of 2019 by the São Paulo Association of Art Critics.
