= Candita Batista =

- Born: October 3, 1916; Camagüey
- Origin: Cuba
- Died: April 1, 2016 (aged 99); Camagüey
- Genres: Afro-Caribbean music
- Occupation: Singer
- Formerly of: Nat King Cole, Charles Aznavour, Lola Flores

Candita Batista (October 3, 1916 – April 1, 2016) was a Cuban singer, known internationally as an exponent of Afro-Caribbean music. In the course of her career she travelled worldwide and appeared with Nat King Cole, Charles Aznavour, Lola Flores and other stars.

== Career ==
She was born in Camagüey, and began her musical career in 1932, aged 16, becoming the first woman in the city to join a male band; in 1937, she moved to Havana. In 1941, she travelled with her band to Mexico City, where she appeared at the Teatro Lirico. In 1948, she toured Latin America as part of a group, visiting Nicaragua, Guatemala, Honduras, Panama and Colombia. During this period she had to struggle against racism.

In 1959 she toured Europe, appearing in front of King Farouk of Egypt in a concert in Rome. She spent eleven years in Europe before returning to Cuba. She continued to sing professionally up to the age of 94. Towards the end of her career, she founded the Mokekeré Orchestra.

She won numerous awards, including Hija Ilustre de la Provincia de Camagüey (Illustrious Daughter of the Province of Camagüey, the Alejo Carpentier Medal, and the Distinción por la Cultura Nacional. In 2011, she received a special award for lifetime achievement from the Association of Musicians of the National Union of Writers and Artists of Cuba (UNEAC). She died in hospital in her home town of Camagüey, aged 99.

In 2003, she was the subject of a short documentary film, Candita Batista, la vedette negra de Cuba (26 minutes), made by Manuel Jorge Pérez
