= De Contrabando =

Single by Jenni Rivera

from the album Parrandera, Rebelde y Atrevida
- Released: 2006
- Recorded: 2005
- Genre: Banda ballad
- Length: 3:02
- Label: Fonovisa
- Songwriter: Joan Sebastian

Jenni Rivera singles chronology
"Qué Me Vas a Dar" (2005)	"De Contrabando" (2006)	"No Vas a Creer" (2006)

"De Contrabando" ("Smuggled") is a song written by Joan Sebastian. It was first performed by Mexican singer Imelda, and included on her album Aparentemente, released in 1991. Six years later, was performed by fellow Mexican singer Zayda y los Culpables and released by Musart Records as the second single from her self-titled album in 1997. Mexican-American singer Jenni Rivera recorded a cover version for her studio album Parrandera, Rebelde y Atrevida. "De Contrabando" was released as the second single from the album in 2006. In the United States, the song peaked at number fourteen on the Billboard Hot Latin Songs chart and number one on the Billboard Regional Mexican Songs chart. The song was nominated for a Lo Nuestro Award for Regional Mexican Song of the Year at the 2007 Lo Nuestro Awards. Rivera was also recognized for Regional Mexican Female Artist of the Year. Rivera was also awarded Regional Mexican Airplay Song of the Year for at the 2007 Latin Billboard Music Awards.

== Chart performance ==
Chart (2006)	Peak position
US Hot Latin Tracks (Billboard)	14
US Regional Mexican Songs (Billboard)	1
