= Álex Anwandter =

Chilean singer songwriter

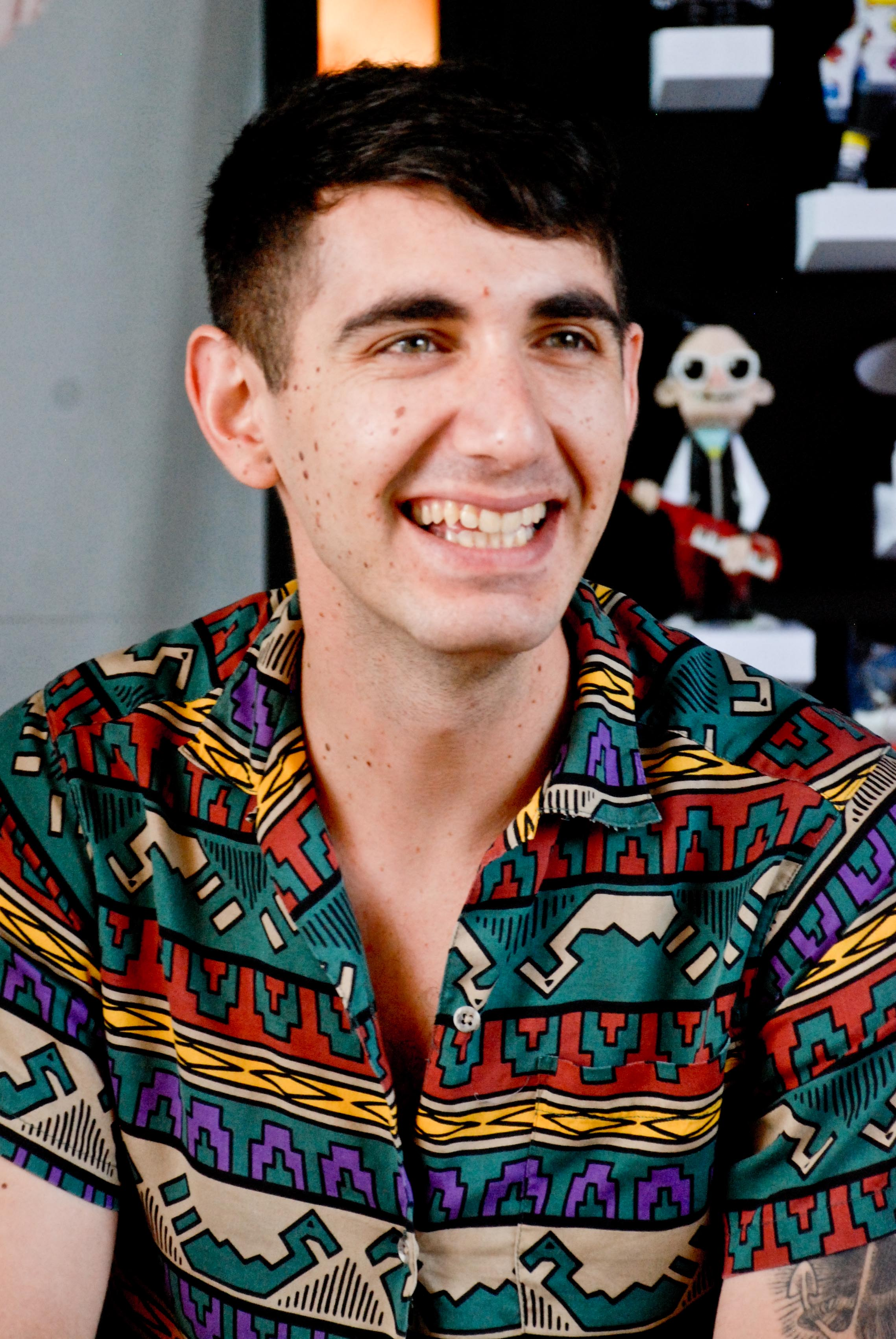
- Anwandter in 2011.
- Born: Álex Anwandter Donoso; March 24, 1983 (age 43); Santiago, Chile
- Occupations: Singer-songwriter; composer; director
- Years active: 2005–present

Álex Anwandter Donoso (born March 24, 1983, in Santiago) is a Chilean singer-songwriter, musician, and film and music video director. He became popular as the vocalist for the band Teleradio Donoso (2005–2009). In 2010, he began work as a soloist. Anwandter has two nominations for the Latin Grammy for Best New Artist and Best Short Form Music Video.

== Biography ==
Anwandter's Chilean family history goes back to the German Carlos Anwandter, who emigrated to Chile in 1850 and became one of the leaders of the German colonization of Valdivia. Álex's father, Paul Anwandter, lived a large part of his life in Brazil before moving to Chile at the age of 26.

As a child, Anwandter took violin lessons. He went to school at Santiago College, and later he began studying psychology at university, but abandoned it shortly thereafter. He was also temporarily a student at the Escuela Moderna de Música but didn't show much interest in music theory.

Anwandter identifies as queer, is a vegetarian, and resides in Los Angeles as of 2018.

== Discography ==
- Odisea (2010)
- Rebeldes (2011)
- Álex & Daniel (2013, with Gepe)
- Amiga (2016)
- Latinoamericana (2018)
- El diablo en el cuerpo (2023)
- Dime Precioso (2024)

With Teleradio Donoso

- Teleradio Donoso EP (2005)
- Gran Santiago (2007)
- Bailar y Llorar (2008)

Production discography

- No soy uno (Fother Muckers, 2007)
- Bailar y Llorar (Teleradio Donoso, 2008)
- Odisea (2010)
- Rebeldes (2011)
- Éxito Mundial (Adrianigual, 2011)
- Álex & Daniel (with Gepe, 2013)
- Odio (Planeta No, 2015)
- Prenda (Francisco Victoria, 2018)
- Tu Historia (Julieta Venegas, 2022)
- Maquillada en la Cama (Juliana Gattas, 2024)
- Rápido Mamá (María Wolff, 2025)

== Videography ==
- 2007: Pitica – Teleradio Donoso
- 2007: Gran Santiago – Teleradio Donoso
- 2007: Eras mi persona favorita – Teleradio Donoso
- 2007: Máquinas – Teleradio Donoso
- 2007: Tres caras largas – Fother Muckers
- 2008: Un día te vas – Teleradio Donoso
- 2008: Amar en el campo – Teleradio Donoso
- 2008: Bailar y llorar – Teleradio Donoso
- 2009: Eramos todos felices – Teleradio Donoso
- 2009: Cama de clavos – Teleradio Donoso
- 2010: Cabros – Odisea
- 2010: Casa latina – Odisea
- 2012: Tatuaje – Álex Anwandter
- 2012: ¿Cómo puedes vivir contigo mismo? – Álex Anwandter
- 2013: Tormenta – Álex Anwandter
- 2014: Rebeldes – Álex Anwandter
- 2016: Siempre es viernes en mi corazón – Álex Anwandter
- 2017: Cordillera – Álex Anwandter
- 2018: Locura – Álex Anwandter

=== Director ===
- 2009: Éramos todos felices – Teleradio Donoso
- 2009: Cama de clavos – Teleradio Donoso
- 2010: Cabros – Odisea
- 2010: Hasta la verdad – Javiera Mena
- 2010: Casa Latina – Odisea
- 2012: Tatuaje – Álex Anwandter
- 2016: Siempre es viernes en mi corazón – Álex Anwandter
- 2018: Locura – Álex Anwandter

== Filmography ==
- 2016: Nunca vas a estar solo
