= Yango-Asker =

Yango-Asker Янго-Аскер
- Selo
- Location within Astrakhan Oblast Location within Russia
- Coordinates: 46°15′N 47°38′E
- Country: Russia
- Region: Astrakhan Oblast
- District: Narimanovsky District
- Time zone: UTC+4:00

Yango-Asker (Russian: Янго-Аскер, Tatar: Yaña Äskär) is a rural locality (a selo) in Lineyninsky Selsoviet, Narimanovsky District, Astrakhan Oblast, Russia. The population was 226 as of 2010. There are 2 streets.

== Geography ==
Yango-Asker is located 71 km southwest of Narimanov (the district's administrative centre) by road. Krasnye Barrikady is the nearest rural locality.
