= List of number-one songs of 2016 (Colombia) =

This is a list of the National-Report Top 100 Nacional number-one songs of 2016. Chart rankings are based on radio play and are issued weekly. The data is compiled monitoring radio stations through an automated system in real-time.

== Number ones by week ==
Key
†	Song of the year

Week	Issue date	Song	Artist(s)	Ref.
1	January 1	"Desde el día en que te fuiste"	ChocQuibTown	
2	January 8	"Desde el día en que te fuiste"	ChocQuibTown	
3	January 15	"Desde el día en que te fuiste"	ChocQuibTown	
4	January 22	"Desde el día en que te fuiste"	ChocQuibTown	
5	January 29	"Ginza"	J Balvin	
6	February 5	"Vestirse de Amor (La Flor)"	Felipe Pelaez	
7	February 12	"Vestirse de Amor (La Flor)"	Felipe Pelaez	
8	February 19	"Vestirse de Amor (La Flor)"	Felipe Pelaez	
9	February 26	"Vestirse de Amor (La Flor)"	Felipe Pelaez	
10	March 4	"Vestirse de Amor (La Flor)"	Felipe Pelaez	
11	March 11	"Vestirse de Amor (La Flor)"	Felipe Pelaez	
12	March 18	"Hasta el Amanecer"	Nicky Jam	
13	March 25	"Vestirse de Amor (La Flor)"	Felipe Pelaez	
14	April 1	"Vestirse de Amor (La Flor)"	Felipe Pelaez	
15	April 8	"Vestirse de Amor (La Flor)"	Felipe Pelaez	
16	April 15	"Vestirse de Amor (La Flor)"	Felipe Pelaez	
17	April 22	"El Perdedor"	Maluma	
18	April 29	"El Perdedor"	Maluma	
19	May 6	"El Perdedor"	Maluma	
20	May 13	"El Perdedor"	Maluma	
21	May 20	"El Perdedor"	Maluma	
22	May 27	"La Bicicleta"†	Carlos Vives with Shakira	
23	June 3	"La Bicicleta"†	Carlos Vives with Shakira	
24	June 10	"La Bicicleta"†	Carlos Vives with Shakira	
25	June 17	"La Bicicleta"†	Carlos Vives with Shakira	
26	June 24	"La Bicicleta"†	Carlos Vives with Shakira	
27	July 1	"La Bicicleta"†	Carlos Vives with Shakira	
28	July 8	"La Bicicleta"†	Carlos Vives with Shakira	
29	July 15	"La Bicicleta"†	Carlos Vives with Shakira	
30	July 22	"La Bicicleta"†	Carlos Vives with Shakira	
31	July 29	"La Bicicleta"†	Carlos Vives with Shakira	
32	August 5	"La Bicicleta"†	Carlos Vives with Shakira	
33	August 12	"La Bicicleta"†	Carlos Vives with Shakira	
34	August 19	"La Bicicleta"†	Carlos Vives with Shakira	
35	August 26	"La Bicicleta"†	Carlos Vives with Shakira	
36	September 2	"La Bicicleta"†	Carlos Vives with Shakira	
37	September 9	"La Bicicleta"†	Carlos Vives with Shakira	
38	September 16	"La Bicicleta"†	Carlos Vives with Shakira	
39	September 23	"La Bicicleta"†	Carlos Vives with Shakira	
40	September 30	"La Bicicleta"†	Carlos Vives with Shakira	
41	October 7	"Fuego"	Juanes	
42	October 14	"Fuego"	Juanes	
43	October 21	"Traicionera"	Sebastian Yatra	
44	October 28	"Traicionera"	Sebastian Yatra	
45	November 4	"Traicionera"	Sebastian Yatra	
46	November 11	"Traicionera"	Sebastian Yatra	
47	November 18	"Ya no me duele mas"	Silvestre Dangond	
48	November 25	"Traicionera"	Sebastian Yatra	
49	December 2	"Traicionera"	Sebastian Yatra	
50	December 9	"Ya no me duele mas"	Silvestre Dangond	
51	December 16	"Ya no me duele mas"	Silvestre Dangond	
52	December 23	"Ya no me duele mas"	Silvestre Dangond	
