= Lendakaris Muertos =

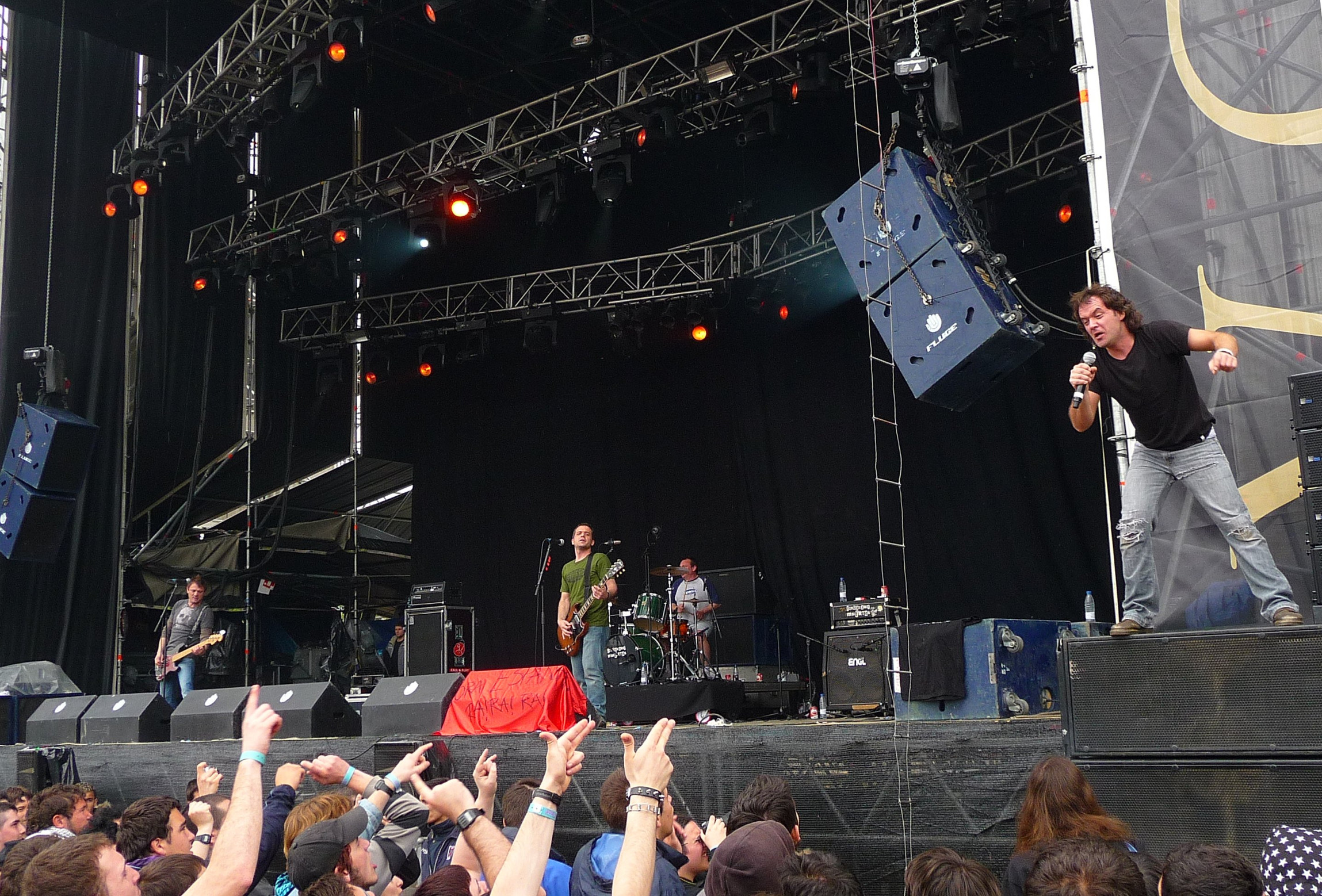
- Lendakaris Muertos performing in Mérida in 2009

Background information
- Origin: Pamplona, Navarre, Spain
- Genres: Punk
- Years active: 2004-present
- Label: Gor Diskak
- Members: Aitor Ibarretxe; Joxemi Urkullu; Jokin Garaikoetxea; Potxeta Ardanza
- Website: www.lendakaris.com

Lendakaris Muertos are a punk rock band formed in Pamplona, Spain in 2004. The band is known for their orthodox punk, with fast and short tunes, usually dealing in an ironic way about the social problems in the Basque Country and Spain. The band's name (Dead Lendakaris in Spanish) is inspired by the American band Dead Kennedys.

== Members ==
- Aitor Ibarretxe - Vocals
- Asier Aguirre - Guitar and backing vocals
- Txema Garaikoetxea - Bass and backing vocals
- Potxeta Ardanza - Drums

== Discography ==
Albums

- Lendakaris Muertos (2005)
- Se habla español (2006)
- Vine, vi y me vendí (2008)
- Crucificados por el antisistema (2012)
- Cicatriz en la matrix (2016)
- Podrán Cortar la Droga Pero No la Primavera (2017)

Live albums

- Directo a los güevos (2009)

Tapes

- Lendakaris Muertos (2004)
