= Entre Colegas =

Studio album by Andy González
- Released: 2016
- Genre: Latin Jazz

Entre Colegas is an album by Andy González. It earned González a Grammy Award nomination for Best Latin Jazz Album.
