= Betsy Pecanins =

Mexican singer and composer (1954–2016)

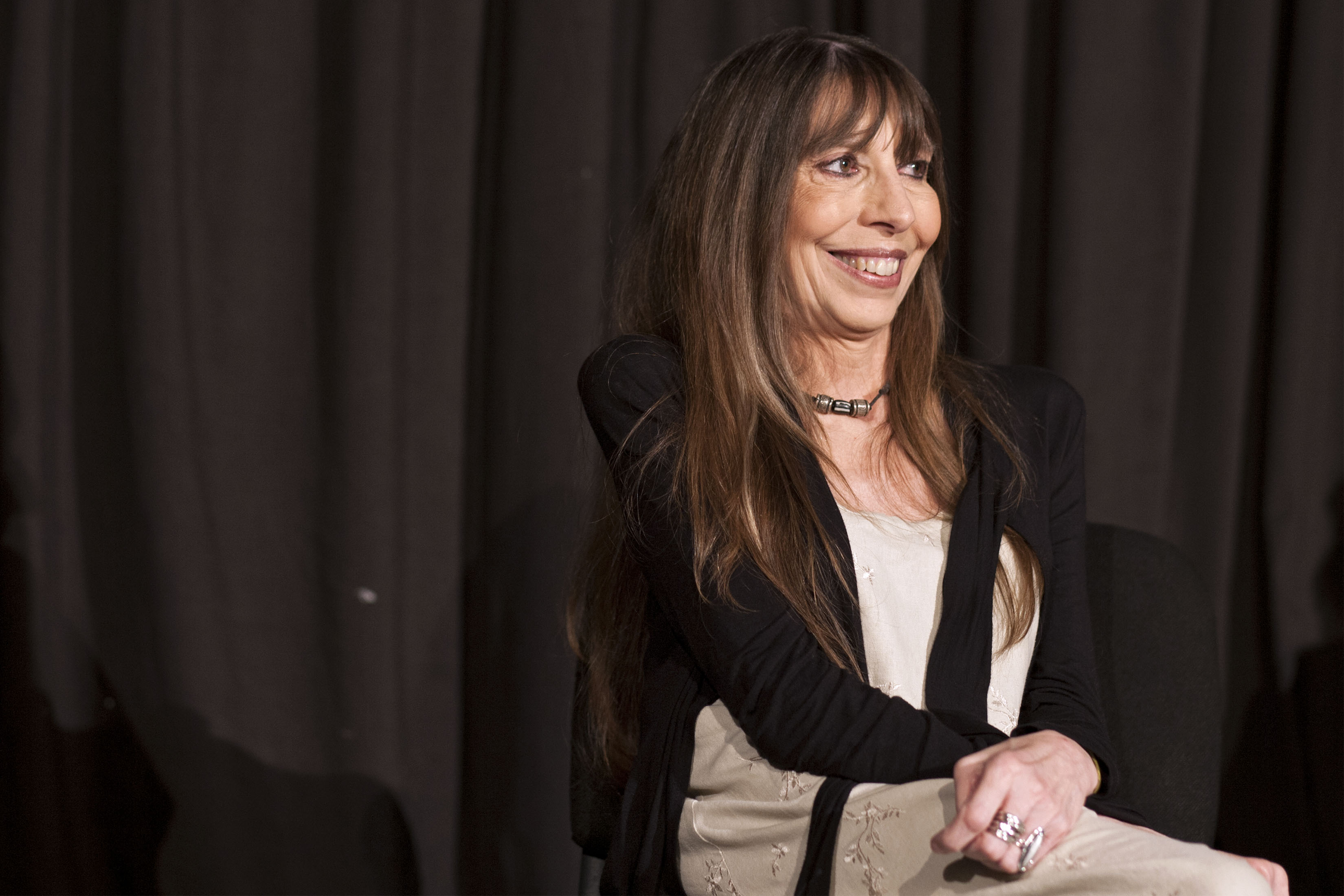
Betsy Pecanins (2015).

Elizabeth Taylor Pecanins (1954 – December 13, 2016) was an American-born Mexican singer, songwriter and record producer. Known in Mexico as Queen of the Blues

== Biography ==
Betsy Pecanins was born to a Catalan mother and an American father and grew up in an art-conscious family. For example, her mother Ana María Pecanins and her aunt Teresa founded the Galería Pecanins art gallery in Mexico City and Barcelona. She spent her first years in Phoenix, Arizona, United States. In 1977 she emigrated to Mexico to pursue her artistic career, where she settled. In 1980 she recorded her first album, Viendo tus ojos. Throughout her career she suffered the consequences of the culture of machismo prevalent in Mexico, and the lack of belief in a woman being able to be a credible musician in her own right.

The musical style of Pecanins was described by blues singer Papa John Creach as "unique. You must have black blood hidden in your body," he commented to her. Her music was employed in such films as; La reina de la noche (about the singer Lucha Reyes, where she performed the soundtrack), Hasta morir, Dos crímenes, Cilantro y perejil and Asesino en serio.

On August 29, 2015, she received a tribute to her artistic career at Teatro de la Ciudad Esperanza Iris in Mexico City, where singers such as Iraida Noriega and Regina Orozco participated, among others. Pecanins had stayed away from the stages until that date due to complications caused by the spasmodic dysphonia affecting her vocal cords.

Pecanins died of a stroke at the age of 62 on December 13, 2016.

== Discography ==
- Viendo tus ojos (Discos Pentagrama, 1980)
- Vent amb veus (Discos Pentagrama, 1981)
- Canta blues (1985)
- El sabor de mis palabras (1987)
- La reina de la noche (1994)
- "Nada Que Perder" ( Discos Milan 1994 ) Betsy Pecanins • Guillermo Briseno
- El efecto tequila (Discos Milán, 1995)
- Sólo Beatles (Discos Milán, 1996)
- Recuento (1997)
- Esta que habita mi cuerpo (1999)
- Tequila azul y batuta (2003)
- Lara (2004)
- Blues en el alma (2006)
- Sones (2009)

After Sones (2009), she released no further albums.
