= Apanhador Só =

Brazilian rock band

Apahandor Só
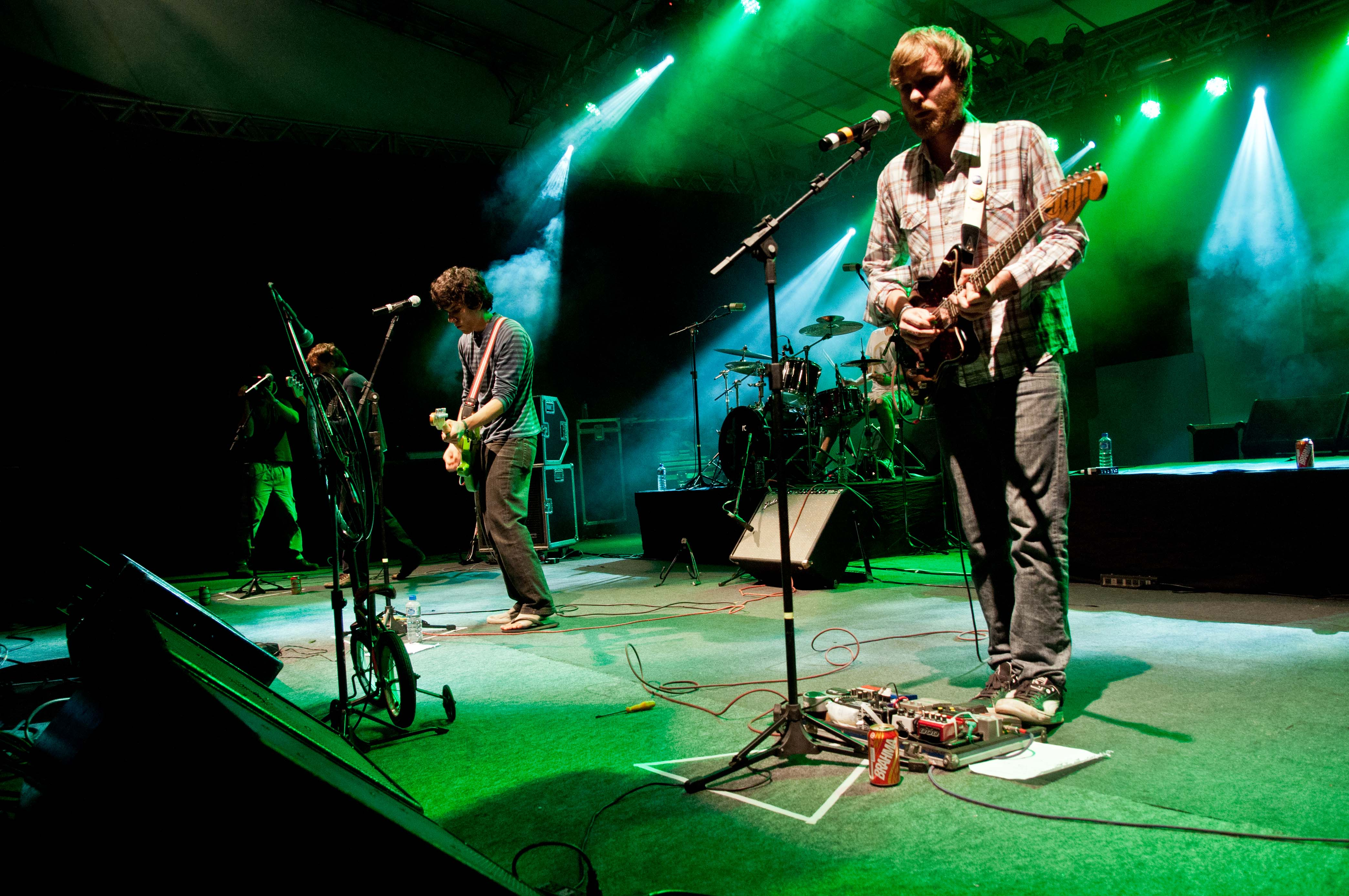
- Apanhador Só performing in live in Parque Municipal, Belo Horizonte, 2012.

Background information
- Origin: Porto Alegre, Rio Grande do Sul, Brazil
- Genres: Alternative rock, experimental rock, indie rock
- Years active: 2003–2017
- Label: Independent
- Members: Alexandre Kumpinski; Felipe Zancanaro; Fernão Agra
- Website: apanhadorso.com

Apanhador Só is a Brazilian rock band formed in 2003 by Alexandre Kumpinski (vocals and guitar), Felipe Zancanaro (guitar) and Fernão Agra (bass guitar).

== Members ==
=== Current members ===
- Alexandre Kumpinski – vocals and guitar
- Felipe Zancanaro guitar
- Fernão Agra – bass guitar

== Discography ==
=== Studio albums ===
- 2010: "Apanhador Só"
- 2013: "Antes Que Tu Conte Outra"
- 2017: "Meio que tudo é um"

=== EPs ===
- 2006 – "Embrulho pra levar"
- 2012 – "Paraquedas"

=== Live albums ===
- 2011 – "Acústico-Sucateiro"
