= Yangos =

Yangos is a quartet of instrumental music formed in 2005. Integrated for the following musicians: César Casara, Cristiano Klein, Rafael Scopel and Tomás Savaris, it has a strong influence of contemporary Latin American and regional music. it has a strong influence of contemporary Latin American and regional music. The quartet is known for spreading regional Gaucho music in a contemporary way.

Established in the Serra Gaúcha in South of Brazil, it brought instrumental music from Rio Grande do Sul to all of Brazil and also to Latin America through live shows and TV programs. In Brazil, Yangos has already released five albums in CD and one in DVD, they are: Tangos y Milongas (2009), À Pampas (2013), Pampa: Pátria de Todos (2016), recorded in partnership with Argentine singer Dante Ramon Ledesma, Chamamé (2017) and Brasil Sim Senhor (2018). The album Chamamé was nominated in the Best Album category for Roots Music at Latin Grammy Award 2017 in Las Vegas, United States. In 2018 it was selected for FIMPRO-2018 in Guadalajara, Mexico, one of the biggest music fairs in Latin America.

The actual work Brasil Sim Senhor was released by the label Natura Musical: Brasil, Sim Senhor!. The album reflects the band experience playing in several stages throughout in Brazil and in different countries of America. It is a result of the mixture of sounds coming from southern Brazil; from the heat of a tropical country, and from the cultural plurality acquired in international experiences.

Among the influences of the Yangos Instrumental Quartet, one can cite Astor Piazzolla with a new tango, Richard Galliano changing the French traditional music to the new musette, Lucio Yanel who introduced Chamamé in Rio Grande do Sul, Raul Barboza and Nini Flores who plays the Chamamé to the whole world.

== Discography ==
Yangos has released four studio albums and one live album as recorded CD and DVD, all with independent labels:

=== Studio albums ===
- Tangos y Milongas (2009)
- Às Pampas (2013)
- Chamamé (2016)
- Brasil, Sim Senhor (2018)

=== Live albums ===
- Pampa: Pátria de Todos (2016) live in Caxias do Sul with Dante Ramon Ledesma

=== Live DVD ===
- Pampa: Pátria de Todos (2016) live in Caxias do Sul with Dante Ramon Ledesma

== Awards and nominations ==
Yangos received three nominations in the Açorianos Prize of Music in 2016:

- Best Regional Album;
- Best DVD;
- Best Regional Interpreter (winner).

It has also received a nomination at the 18th Annual Latin GRAMMY Awards:

- Best Brazilian Roots Album.
