= Mon Laferte discography =

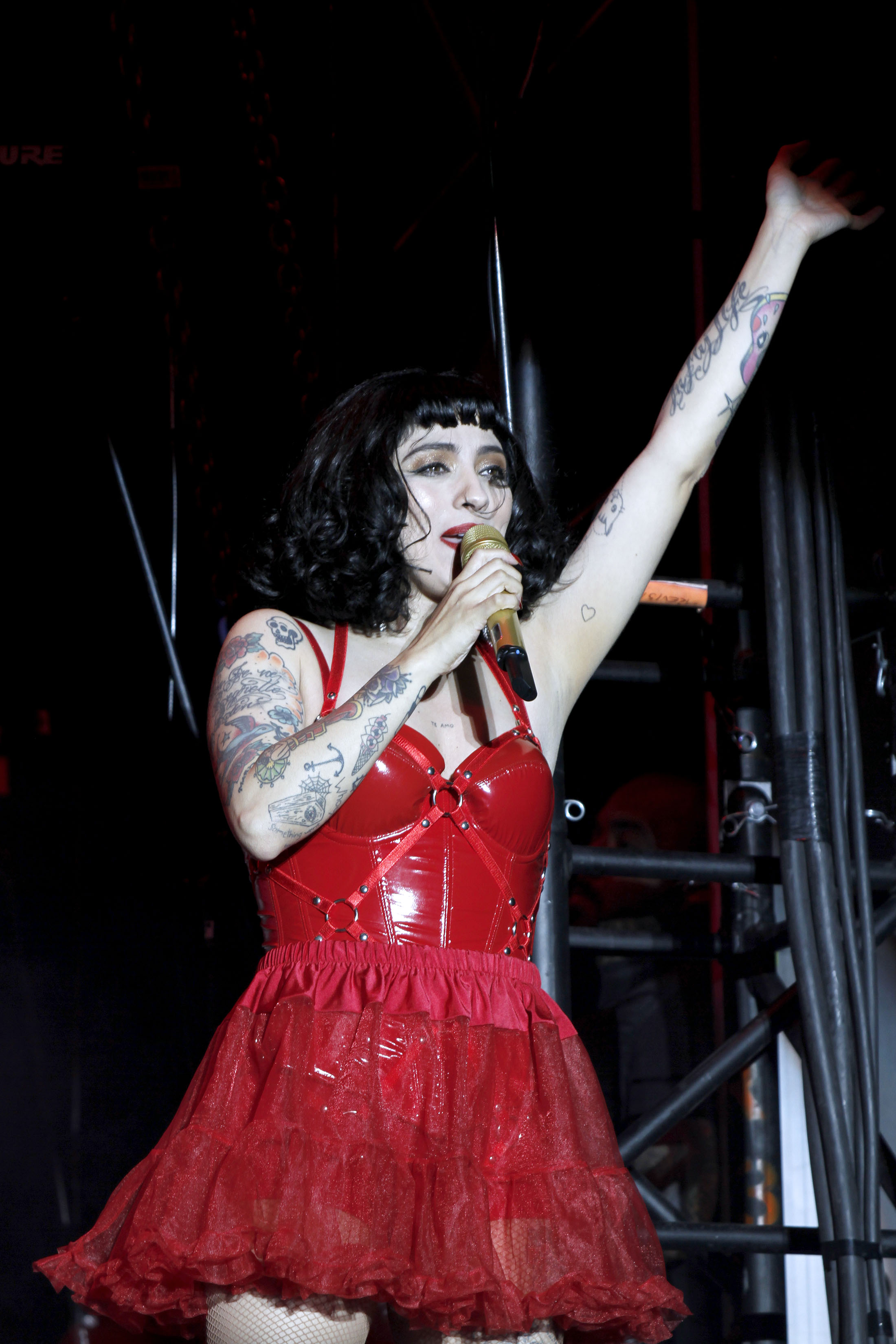
- Laferte performing in 2020
- Studio albums: 11
- Singles: 41
- Promotional singles: 3

Chilean Mexican singer-songwriter Mon Laferte has released 11 studio albums, 41 singles and three promotional singles.

Laferte released her first studio album, La Chica de Rojo, in 2003. In 2007, Laferte decided to start a new chapter in her musical career by moving to Mexico City from Chile, recording an album in 2009, which was released two years later titled Desechable. In 2013, she released her third album, Tornasol. She received attention in 2015 with her single "Tu Falta De Querer" from the album Mon Laferte, Vol. 1. Laferte released her fifth album La Trenza, her most acclaimed album to date, in 2017. Her single with Colombian rock star Juanes, "Amárrame" won the Best Alternative Song award at the 18th Latin GRAMMYs. During the year 2018, Mon worked on her sixth studio album, Norma, which was recorded in a single session in studio A of Capitol Studios of Los Angeles, California, United States. In 2021 she released her albums Seis and 1940 Carmen, the former receiving Mon Laferte's first Grammy nomination.

In 2023, the film Migration was released, in which she sang a spanglish cover of the song Survivor. This same year, on November 10, 2023, she released Autopoiética, along with the singles "Tenochtitlán" and "NO+SAD." The album received a Grammy nomination for Best Latin Rock or Alternative Album and won the Latin Grammy for Best Alternative Music Album. Later, in 2024 Mon Laferte released "Obra de Dios" and collaborated with Gepe on the track "Bolero Libra", which won the Pulsar Award for Song of the Year. In 2025, Mon Laferte released her ninth studio album, Femme Fatale, which was met with great public acclaim and critical praise. It reached number 10 on the Top Latin Pop Albums chart. It was preceded by the single "Otra Noche de Llorar," released in March of the same year.

== Albums ==
=== Studio albums ===
List of studio albums, with release date, label, selected chart positions, and certifications shown
Title	Details	Peak chart positions						Certifications
Title	Details	CHI	MEX	ARG	SPA	US LAT	US LAT POP	Certifications
La Chica de Rojo (Note: as Monserrat Bustamante)	Released: 12 July 2003; Label: Warner Music Chile; Formats: CD, cassette	—	—	—	—	—	—	IFPI Chile: Platinum + Gold
Desechable	Released: 30 June 2011; Label: Self-released; Formats: Digital download, streaming, CD	—	—	—	—	—	—	
Tornasol	Released: 7 January 2013; Label: Self-released; Formats: Digital download, streaming, CD	—	—	—	—	—	—	
Mon Laferte, Vol. 1	Released: 31 January 2015 · 21 August 2015 (re-released); Label: Universal Music México; Formats: Digital download, streaming, CD + DVD, LP, CD	1	4	—	—	—	23	IFPI Chile: 16× Platinum; AMPROFON: Diamond + Gold; UNIMPRO: Platinum
La Trenza	Released: 28 April 2017; Label: Universal Music México; Formats: Digital download, streaming, CD + DVD, LP, CD	24	1	—	76	12	4	IFPI Chile: 12× Platinum; AMPROFON: Diamond + Gold; ASINCOL: Gold; CAPIF: Gold; UNIMPRO: 2× Platinum; IFPI Ecuador: Gold
Norma	Released: 9 November 2018; Label: Universal; Formats: Digital download, streaming, CD, LP	9	2	11	67	24	9	IFPI Chile: 2x Platinum; AMPROFON: 2x Platinum + Gold
Seis	Released: 8 April 2021; Label: Universal; Formats: Digital download, streaming, CD, LP	6	12	14	23	—	—	
1940 Carmen	Released: 29 October 2021; Label: Universal; Formats: Digital download, streaming, CD, LP	6	14	15	49	78	—	
Autopoiética	Released: 10 November 2023; Label: Universal; Formats: Digital download, streaming, CD, 2×LP	12	21	27	79	86	—	
Femme Fatale	Released: 24 October 2025; Label: Sony Latin; Formats: Digital download, streaming, CD, 2xLP	4	4	7	20	16	10	AMPROFON: Gold
Femme Fatale Vol. 2	Released: 12 June 2026; Label: Sony Latin; Formats: Digital download, streaming, LP	—	—	—	—	—	—	
"—" denotes a recording that did not chart or was not released in that territory.

=== Live albums ===
List of live albums, with release date and label shown
Title	Details	Peak chart positions	
Title	Details	SPA	MEX
Sola Con Mis Monstruos	Released: 31 January 2020; Label: Universal Music; Formats: CD+DVD, digital download, streaming	88	3

== Singles ==
=== As lead artist ===
List of singles, with year released, selected chart positions, certifications, and album name shown
Title	Year	Peak chart positions										Certifications	Album
Title	Year	CHI	CHI Pop	ARG	ECU	MEX	MEX Pop	MEX Air	MEX Esp Air	US Latin	US Latin Pop	Certifications	Album
"Lo Mismo que Yo" (Note: It was released as a single from an album that was never released because the singer suffered from thyroid cancer. For this reason, the single was later withdrawn and remains unreleased.)	2009	—	—	—	—	—	—	—	—	—	—		Non-album single
"Soy"	2011	—	—	—	—	—	—	—	—	—	—		Desechable
"Depresión"	2011	—	—	—	—	—	—	—	—	—	—		Desechable
"Tóxico"	2011	—	—	—	—	—	—	—	—	—	—		Desechable
"Desechable"	2012	—	—	—	—	—	—	—	—	—	—		Desechable
"Un Solo Hombre No Puedo Tener"	2012	—	—	—	—	—	—	—	—	—	—		Desechable
"Ángel Negro"	2013	—	—	—	—	—	—	—	—	—	—		Tornasol
"Hey Hey"	2013	—	—	—	—	—	—	—	—	—	—		Tornasol
"Tornasol" (ft. Renne Mooi)	2013	—	—	—	—	—	—	—	—	—	—		Tornasol
"Lo Que Pido"	2014	—	—	—	—	—	—	—	—	—	—		Tornasol
"Orgasmo Para Dos"	2014	—	—	—	—	—	—	—	—	—	—		Tornasol
"Tormento"	2015	16	—	—	—	—	—	—	—	—	—	AMPROFON: Platinum + Gold	Mon Laferte, Vol. 1
"Amor Completo"	2015	3	3	—	—	—	14	—	—	—	—	AMPROFON: 4× Platinum + Gold	Mon Laferte, Vol. 1
"Tu Falta De Querer"	2015	15	12	93	40	20	4	—	—	—	—	AMPROFON: 3× Diamond + Gold; PROMUSICAE: Gold	Mon Laferte, Vol. 1
"Si Tú Me Quisieras"	2016	7	14	—	—	16	4	—	—	—	—	AMPROFON: 2× Platinum + Gold	Mon Laferte, Vol. 1
"Tírate"	2016	69	—	—	—	—	—	—	—	—	—		Non-album single
"Amárrame" (ft. Juanes)	2017	2	2	—	89	2	2	12	4	—	—	IFPI Chile: Platinum (Streaming); AMPROFON: Diamond + 2x Platinum + Gold; ASINCOL: Platinum; UNIMPRO: Gold	La Trenza
"Mi Buen Amor" (ft. Enrique Bunbury)	2017	2	—	2	63	11	2	—	—	—	—	AMPROFON: Diamond + Platinum	La Trenza
"Primaveral"	2017	16	— (Note: "Primaveral" did not enter the Top 20 Mexico Pop Chart but did peak number 14 on the Top 20 México Nacional.)	—	—	9	1	—	—	—	—	AMPROFON: Platinum	La Trenza
"Antes de Ti"	2018	19	13	—	31	13	2	30	9	—	—	AMPROFON: 3× Platinum + Gold	Non-album single
"Invéntame"	2018	6	—	—	76	—	4	—	—	—	—		Todos somos MAS
"El Beso"	2018	1	1	71	61	1	1	5	2	—	—	AMPROFON: 3× Platinum	Norma
"Por Qué Me Fui a Enamorar de Ti"	2018	— (Note: "Por Qué Me Fui a Enamorar de Ti" did not chart the Top 20 México General Chart but did peak at number 14 on the Top 20 México Nacional.)	—	—	—	—	—	—	—	—	—	AMPROFON: 2× Platinum	Norma
"El Mambo"	2018	80	—	—	—	—	—	—	—	—	—	AMPROFON: 2× Platinum	Norma
"Caderas Blancas"	2018	48	55	—	—	—	5	—	—	—	—	AMPROFON: 2× Platinum + Gold	Norma
"Funeral"	2019	—	—	—	—	15	—	—	—	—	—	AMPROFON: 2× Platinum	Norma
"Cumbia Para Olvidar"	2019	—	—	—	—	—	—	—	—	—	—	AMPROFON: 2× Platinum	Norma
"Chilango Blues"	2019	56	—	—	—	—	—	—	27	—	—		Non-album singles
"Canción de Mierda"	2019	97	—	—	—	—	—	—	—	—	—		Non-album singles
"Paisaje Japonés"	2019	—	—	—	—	20	—	—	—	—	—		Non-album singles
"Plata Ta Tá" (ft. Guaynaa)	2019	13	— (Note: "Plata Ta Tá" did not enter the Top 20 Chile General but did peak at number 1 on the Top 20 Chile Nacional and the Top 20 Chile Urbano.)	—	91	—	16	—	—	—	—	AMPROFON: Gold	Non-album singles
"Biutiful"	2020	1	—	—	—	—	—	—	—	—	—		Non-album singles
"Love" (Note: Cover of Zoé.)	2020	—	—	—	—	—	—	—	—	—	—		Non-album singles
"Que Se Sepa Nuestro Amor" (ft. Alejandro Fernández)	2020	19	— (Note: "Que Se Sepa Nuestro Amor" did not enter on the Top 20 Chile Pop Chart but did peak at number 1 on the Top 20 Chile Nacional.)	—	—	3	—	38	15	—	—		SEIS
"Se Me Va a Quemar El Corazón"	2021	50	— (Note: "Se Me Va a Quemar El Corazón" did not enter on the Top 20 Chile Pop Chart but did peak at number 1 on the Top 20 Chile Popular. and number 9 on the Top 20 Chile Nacional.)	—	—	6	—	—	—	—	—		SEIS
"La Mujer" (ft. Gloria Trevi)	2021	58	—	—	—	8	13	46	8	—	—		SEIS
"Amado Mío"	2021	—	—	—	—	—	—	—	—	—	—		SEIS
"Amigos Simplemente"	2021	—	—	—	—	—	—	—	—	—	—		SEIS
"Algo es mejor"	2021	10	1	—	—	4	2	9	4	—	—		1940 Carmen
"Placer Hollywood"	2022	—	—	—	—	10	1	—	—	—	—		1940 Carmen
"Aunque Te Mueras por Volver"	2022	73	—	—	—	11	12	—	—	—	—		SEIS
"Tenochtitlán"	2023	— (Note: "Tenochtitlán" did not enter the Top 20 Chile General Chart but did peak at number 12 on the Top 20 Chile Nacional Chart.)	14	—	—	—	—	—	—	—	—		Autopoiética
"NO+SAD"	2023	—	12	—	—	—	—	—	—	—	—		Autopoiética
"Obra de Dios"	2024	—	—	—	—	—	—	—	—	—	—		Non-album single
"Callejón de los Secretos" (ft. Rauw Alejandro)	2024	—	—	—	—	—	—	—	—	50	—		Cosa Nuestra: Capítulo 0
"Otra Noche de Llorar"	2025	— (Note: "Otra Noche de Llorar" did not enter the Top 20 Chile General Chart but did peak at number 5 on the Top 20 Chile Nacional Chart.)	10	—	—	—	7	—	—	—	—	AMPROFON: Platinum; RIAA (Latin): Gold	Femme Fatale
"Esto es Amor" (ft. Conociendo Rusia)	2025	— (Note: "Esto es Amor" did not chart on the Top 20 Chile General Chart but did peak at number 4 on the Top 20 Chile Nacional Chart.)	4	—	—	—	—	—	—	—	—		Femme Fatale
"La Tirana" (ft. Nathy Peluso)	2025	—	15	—	—	—	—	—	—	—	—		Femme Fatale
"Melancolía"	2025	15	—	—	—	—	11	—	—	— (Note: "Melancolía" did not enter on the Hot Latin Songs chart but did peak at number 22 on the Latin Pop Airplay Chart.)	25	AMPROFON: Gold	Femme Fatale
"Streetfigther" (ft. GRTSCH)	2026	—	—	—	—	—	—	—	—	—	—		Non-album single
"Nuestra Casa"	2026	—	—	—	—	—	—	—	—	—	—		La Casa de Los Espiritus (soundtrack)
"Femme Fatale"	2026	—	—	—	—	—	—	—	—	—	—		Femme Fatale
"Incondicional" (ft. Kidd Voodoo)	2026	2	7	—	—	—	—	—	—	—	—		Euforia
"A Pesar de Ti y de Mí"	2026	— (Note: "A Pesar de Ti y de Mí" did not enter the Top 20 Chile General but did peak at number 10 on the Top 20 Chile Nacional.)	14	—	—	—	—	—	—	—	23		Femme Fatale Vol. 2
"—" denotes items which were not released in that country or failed to chart.

=== As featured artist ===
List of singles, with selected chart positions, showing year released and album name
Title	Year	Peak chart positions					Certifications	Album
Title	Year	CHI	CHI Pop	ARG	MEX Pop	PAR	Certifications	Album
"You Better" (MICO featuring Mon Laferte)	2013	—	—	—	—	—		Non-album single
"Palmar" (Caloncho featuring Mon Laferte)	2015	45	—	67	—	—		Fruta, Vol. II
"Palabras Tristes" (Los Yonic's featuring Mon Laferte)	2016	—	—	—	—	—		Así Te Quiero Yo
"Lo Nuestro" (Bambi featuring Mon Laferte)	2018	—	—	—	—	—		El Encuentro
"Amor" (Los Auténticos Decadentes featuring Mon Laferte)	2018	6	3	1	—	11	AMPROFON: Gold	Fiesta Nacional (MTV Unplugged)
"Madera de Deriva" (António Zambujo featuring Mon Laferte)	2019	—	—	—	—	—		Do Veso
"Dispara Lentamente" (Manuel Carrasco featuring Mon Laferte)	2020	—	—	—	2	—	PROMUSICAE: Gold	Non-album single
"La Danza de las Libélulas" (Manuel García featuring Mon Laferte)	2020	9	—	—	—	—		El Caminante
"Canción sin Miedo" (Vivir Quintana featuring Mon Laferte)	2020	—	—	—	—	—		Te Mereces un Amor
"Que Nadie Sepa Mi Sufrir" (La Sonora Dinamita featuring Mon Laferte)	2020	—	—	—	—	—		Transformando la Cumbia
"Hoy No" (Daniel, Me Estas Matando featuring Mon Laferte)	2021	—	—	—	—	—		Non-album single
"Pensamos" (Nicki Nicole featuring Mon Laferte)	2021	—	—	—	—	87		Parte de Mí
"Dispara" (Rulo featuring Mon Laferte)	2021	—	—	—	—	—		Precipicio
"Traguito" (iLe featuring Mon Laferte)	2022	—	—	—	—	—		Nacarite
"Aline" (Adan Jodorowsky featuring Mon Laferte)	2022	—	—	—	—	—		Mis Grandes Éxitos
"El Perdón" (Pascuala Ilabaca y Fauna featuring Mon Laferte)	2023	—	—	—	—	—		Porteña
"Bolero Libra" (Gepe featuring Mon Laferte)	2024	—	—	—	—	—		Undesastre
"Quiero Dormir Cansado" (Note: cover of the singer Emmanuel, from his album Íntimamente.) (Los Bunkers featuring Mon Laferte)	2024	—	—	—	—	—		Los Bunkers MTV Unplugged
"—" denotes items which were not released in that country or failed to chart.

=== Promotional Singles ===
List of promotional singles, with release year, certifications, and associated album
Title	Year	Certifications	Album
"Vuelve por Favor"	2013		Tornasol
"El Diablo"	2015	AMPROFON: Gold	Mon Laferte, Vol. 1
"Yo Te Qui"	2017	AMPROFON: Gold	La Trenza
"La Trenza"	2017		La Trenza
"No Te Fumes Mi Mariguana"	2018		La Trenza
"Supermercado"	2022		1940 Carmen
"Te juro que volveré"	2023		Autopoiética
"40 y MM"	2023		Autopoiética

== Other charted and certified songs ==
List of other charted songs, with release year, chart positions, and associated album
Title	Year	Peak chart positions	Certifications	Album
Title	Year	CHI	Certifications	Album
"El Cristal"	2015	—	AMPROFON: Gold	Mon Laferte, Vol. 1
"Bonita"	2016	—	AMPROFON: Gold	Mon Laferte, Vol. 1 (Deluxe Edition)
"Pa' Donde Se Fue"	2017	12	AMPROFON: Gold	La Trenza
"Flaco"	2017	13	AMPROFON: Platinum + Gold	La Trenza
"No Me Quites de Acá"	2018	—	AMPROFON: 2x Platinum	Norma
"Quédate esta Noche"	2018	—	AMPROFON: 2x Platinum	Norma
"Ronroneo"	2018	—	AMPROFON: 2x Platinum	Norma
"Si Alguna Vez"	2018	—	AMPROFON: 2x Platinum	Norma
"A Crying Diamond"	2021	13		1940 Carmen
"Niña"	2021	8		1940 Carmen
"No Soy Para Ti"	2021	16		1940 Carmen
"My One and Only Love" (ft. Silvana Estrada & Natalia Lafourcade)	2025	—	AMPROFON: Gold; RIAA (Latin): Gold	Femme Fatale
"—" denotes items which were not released in that country or failed to chart.

== Other appearances ==
List of singles, showing year released and album name
Title	Year	Artist(s)	Album
"Pistola que No Mata"	2013	elClubo	Non-album single
"Busco a alguien"	2015	Flor Amargo	Espejo Cristal, Vol. 1
"Está Bien Ser Lo Peor"	2015	(Me Llamo) Sebastián	La Belleza
"Celos"	2015	José María Napoleón	Vive
"Nunca Jamás"	2016	San Pascualito Rey	Non-album single
"Todos Quieren Ser Un Gato Jazz" (Note: In this album, some singers perform songs taken from other films, this one being taken from the film The Aristocats.)	2016	Caloncho and Esteman	We Love Disney (Latino)
"Asilo"	2017	Jorge Drexler	Salvavidas de Hielo
"Funcional"	2017	Okills	Funcional
"Que He Sacado con Quererte"	2017	Inti-Illimani	El Canto de Todos
"Peligrosa"	2017	Lila Downs	Salón, Lágrimas y Deseo
"Ingrata"	2017	La Santa Cecilia	Amar y Vivir
"Feliz Navidad"	2018	Gwen Stefani	You Make It Feel Like Christmas (2018 Deluxe Edition)
"El Derecho de Vivir en Paz"	2019	Various Artists	Non-album single
"la/SANDIA"	2019	Le Butcherettes	bi/MENTAL
"Amiga"	2020	Rozalén	El Árbol y el Bosque
"Frente a Frente"	2020	Raphael	Raphael 6.0
"Se Portaba Mal"	2020	Kany García	Mesa Para Dos
"Tantas Veces"	2021	Andrés Calamaro	Dios los cría
"La Trenza / Amor Completo"	2021	Natalia Lafourcade	Un Canto por México, Vol. 2
"He Venido a Pedirte Perdón"	2022	Juan Gabriel	Los Dúo 3
"Sasha, Sissí y el Círculo de Baba"	2023	Fito Páez	EADDA9223
"Agua y Sal"	2024	Rosario Flores	Universo de Ley
"Tiempos Violentos"	2025	St. Vincent	Todos Nacen Gritando
"Vuelve"	2026	Juanes	JuanesTeban
"Jangadero (La Jangada)"	2026	Milo J	La Jangada

== Music videos ==
List of music videos, showing year released and director
Title	Year	Director	Ref.
"Yo Sin Tu Amor"	2003	Álvaro Ceppi	
"Lo Mismo que Yo"	2009	Sebastián Soto Chacón	
"Soy"	2011	Sebastián Soto Chacón	
"Depresión"	2011	Sebastián Soto Chacón	
"Tóxico"	2011	Ana María Calva & Mon Laferte	
"Desechable"	2012	Sebastián Soto Chacón	
"Un Solo Hombre No Puedo Tener"	2012	Sebastián Soto Chacón	
"Vuelve por Favor"	2012	Sandro Ventura	
"Ángel Negro"	2013	Sebastián Soto Chacón	
"Hey Hey"	2013	Sebastián Soto Chacón	
"Tornasol"	2013	Sebastián Soto Chacón	
"Depresión" (Note: for the film An Odd Evening in April)	2014	Sebastián Soto Chacón	
"Cielito de Abril"	2014	Sebastián Soto Chacón	
"Lo Que Pido"	2014	Sebastián Soto Chacón	
"Orgasmo para Dos"	2014	Alberto HV	
"Tormento"	2015	Carolina Dagach	
"Amor Completo"	2015	Carolina Dagach	
"Tu Falta de Querer"	2015	Gamaliel de Santiago Ruvalcaba	
"Si Tú Me Quisieras"	2016	Gamaliel de Santiago Ruvalcaba	
"Amarramé" (ft. Juanes)	2017	Gamaliel de Santiago Ruvalcaba	
"Mi Buen Amor" (ft. Enrique Bunbury)	2017	Gamaliel de Santiago Ruvalcaba	
"Primaveral"	2017	Gamaliel de Santiago Ruvalcaba	
"Antes de Ti"	2018	Mon Laferte	
"Invéntame"	2018	Gamaliel de Santiago	
"El Beso"	2018	Sebastián Soto Chacón	
"Por Qué Me Fui a Enamorar de Ti"	2018	Sebastián Soto Chacón	
"El Mambo"	2018	Sebastián Soto Chacón	
"Caderas Blancas"	2018	Sebastián Soto Chacón	
"Funeral"	2019	Sebastián Soto Chacón	
"Cumbia para Olvidar"	2019	Sebastián Soto Chacón	
"Chilango Blues"	2019	Alfredo Altamirano & Mon Laferte	
"Canción de Mierda"	2019	Alfredo Altamirano & Mon Laferte	
"Paisaje Japonés"	2019	Alfredo Altamirano & Mon Laferte	
"Plata Ta Tá" (ft. Guaynaa)	2019	The Broducers	
"Biutiful"	2020	Mon Laferte	
"Que Se Sepa Nuestro Amor"	2020	Rodrigo Robles	
"Se Me Va a Quemar El Corazón"	2021	Rodrigo Robles	
"Se Me Va a Quemar El Corazón" (ft. La Arrolladora Banda El Limón)	2021	Rodrigo Robles	
"La Mujer" (ft. Gloria Trevi)	2021	Rodrigo Robles	
"Amado Mío"	2021	Joel Orta Oviedo	
"Amigos Simplemente"	2021	Alfredo Altamirano	
"Algo es Mejor"	2021	Alfredo Altamirano	
"Aunque Te Mueras por Volver"	2022	Camila Grandi	
"Tenochtitlán"	2023	Camila Grandi	
"NO+SAD"	2023	Camila Grandi	
"Autopoiética"	2023	Camila Grandi	
"Metamorfosis"	2024	Camila Grandi	
"Casta Diva"	2024	Camila Grandi	
"Préndele Fuego"	2024	Camila Grandi	
"Levítico 20:9"	2024	Camila Grandi	
"Obra de Dios"	2024	Camila Grandi	
"Otra Noche de Llorar"	2025	Camila Grandi	
"Esto es Amor" (ft. Conociendo Rusia)	2025	Camila Grandi	
"La Tirana" (ft. Nathy Peluso)	2025	Camila Grandi	
"Melancolía"	2025	Camila Grandi	
"Femme Fatale"	2026	Camila Grandi	
"Incondicional" (ft. Kidd Voodoo)	2026	Camila Grandi	
"A Pesar de Ti y de Mi"	2026	Camila Grandi	
