= Claudia Miranda =

Chilean dancer (born 1968)

- Born: Claudia Marjorie Miranda Rojas; 7 June 1968 (age 58); Santiago, Chile
- Occupation: Dancer

Claudia Marjorie Miranda Rojas (born 7 June 1968) is a Chilean professional dancer.

== Career ==
Claudia Miranda began her television career in Hugo Urrutia's ballet Huganzas, where she shared the stage, among others, with fellow dancer and actor Claudio Moreno, on programs such as Festival de la una, broadcast on the state channel Televisión Nacional de Chile (TVN). A year later, she was hired for the Viña del Mar Song Festival. She participated in commercials for products such as Cheldiz jeans, and appeared on the program Bailando con Claudia, also on the state network.

She experienced a difficult situation while she was on Martes 13, an iconic show on Chilean television in the 1980s and 1990s, broadcast on Canal 13. While dancing for the program's guest, Spanish singer Raphael, he touched her buttock, a moment that was captured by photojournalists and appeared in newspapers the next day.

In the mid-1990s, Miranda joined the TVN morning magazine Buenos Días a Todos.

In 2006, she won the first season of El Baile en TVN. In 2007, she returned to the Viña Festival as an official choreographer. She continued as a juror and dancer of El baile on TVN until 2008.

In the 2010s, she was a choreographer and juror of various talent shows on Chilean television: Mi nombre es… (Canal 13, 2011–2014), Baila Fanta (Canal 13, 2013–2015), The Voice Chile (Canal 13, 2015–2016), Bailando (Canal 13, 2016 ), Rojo (TVN, 2019), and Sigamos de largo (Canal 13, 2019). She also participated, along with her daughter Amanda, in a commercial for the "Yo Tomo, Yo Como" campaign to promote the consumption of dairy products, and had a brief appearance on the telenovela Veinteañero a los 40 (Canal 13, 2016).

In 2019, in addition to her work on Rojo and Sigamos de largo, Miranda participated as a juror on the pilot episode of the dance program El duelo.

== Personal life ==
Claudia Miranda is the daughter of Baltazar Miranda Pérez and Flor Eulogia Rojas Grez. She has been married to Argentine producer Alejandro Omar Costella since 25 February 1999. They met in a nightclub when she was 25. They were together for only three weeks because he accepted a job in Spain, and they maintained a long-distance relationship for eight months. Later, they married and had two children.

== Filmography ==
Year	Program	Role	Notes	Channel	Ref.
1987–1988	Festival de la una	Dancer		TVN	
1989	30th Viña del Mar International Song Festival	Dancer		TVN	
1989	Bailando con Claudia	Dancer		TVN	
1992	Martes 13	Dancer		Universidad Católica de Chile Televisión	
1996	Buenos Días a Todos	Dancer		TVN	
2006-2008	El Baile en TVN	Dancer		TVN	
2007	48th Viña del Mar International Song Festival	Choreographer		Canal 13/TVN	
2011–2014	Mi nombre es…	Dance teacher		Canal 13	
2015–2016	The Voice Chile	Choreographer		Canal 13	
2015–2016	Baila Fanta	Juror		Canal 13	
2016	Bailando	Choreographer; Juror		Canal 13	
2016	Veinteañero a los 40	Herself		Canal 13	
2019	No culpes a la noche	Guest		TVN	
2019	Rojo, el color del talento	Interviewee; Juror		TVN	
2019	Juego contra fuego	Juror		Canal 13	
2019	Había una vez	Dancer	Archive footage from Festival de la una	TVN	
2019	Sigamos de largo	Juror	Only on Fridays	Canal 13	
