= Seis (album) =

Studio album by Mon Laferte
- Released: 8 April 2021
- Genre: Latin pop; bolero; salsa; música mexicana
- Length: 51:34
- Language: Spanish
- Label: Universal
- Producer: Manú Jalil; Sebastián Aracena

Mon Laferte chronology
Norma (2018)	Seis (2021)	1940 Carmen (2021)

Singles from Seis
- 1. "Que Se Sepa Nuestro Amor" Released: 17 September 2020; 2. "Se Me Va a Quemar El Corazón" Released: 21 January 21, 2021; 3. "La Mujer" Released: 7 April 2021

Seis is the seventh studio album by Chilean Mexican singer-songwriter Mon Laferte. It was released on 8 April 2021 through Universal Music México. It was produced by Manu Jalil, who also produced La Trenza, and Sebastián Aracena, and featured collaborations with Mexican singers Gloria Trevi and Alejandro Fernández, and Mexican bandas La Arrolladora Banda El Limón de René Camacho and Mujeres del Viento Florido.

At the 22nd Annual Latin Grammy Awards, the album won Best Singer-Songwriter Album, the song "Que Se Sepa Nuestro Amor" was nominated for Song of the Year and Best Regional Song and the song "La Mujer" was nominated for Best Pop Song. At the 64th Annual Grammy Awards, the album was nominated for Best Regional Mexican Music Album (including Tejano), being Laferte's first Grammy award nomination.

== Background ==
Laferte found inspiration for the album from Regional Mexican music and also after watching the documentary Chavela about Costa Rican-born Mexican singer Chavela Vargas, with whom she felt a connection due to both having the life story of coming to Mexico as an immigrant and living in Tepoztlán. The album explores themes of power, desire and womanhood in song such as "Se Me Va la Vida" ("My Life is Running Out") alongside the banda Mujeres del Viento Florido, which is about Chilean women prisoners and "La Mujer" ("The Woman") with Gloria Trevi, which according to Laferte, started as a "toxic" song but was re-written afterwards and turned into a song about "ending a relationship and the survival instinct", describing it as a "healing process".

The album title, Seis (six in Spanish), refers to the fact that the album is her sixth under the name Mon Laferte; however, it is actually her seventh album overall since her first studio album, La Chica de Rojo (2003), was released under her legal name, Monserrat Bustamante.

== Singles ==
The first single was "Que Se Sepa Nuestro Amor" with Alejandro Fernández, released on 17 September 2020. The second single, "Se Me Va A Quemar El Corazón", was released on 21 January 2021. "La Mujer", a collaboration with Gloria Trevi was released on 7 April 2021 as the third single.

== Critical reception ==
Professional ratings
Review scores
Source	Rating
AllMusic	4/5 stars

Thom Jurek from AllMusic gave the album four out of five stars, naming the album a "milestone" alongside Norma in Laferte's career, he also wrote that "each track is delivered with the consistency, care, honesty, and obsessive attention to detail that Laferte's poetic lyrics and melodies require", ending the review with "the humble presentation here contrasts with her songwriting ambition in what amounts to a truly visionary work of popular art".

Seis was ranked at number 14 in the list for "The 35 Best Spanish-Language and Bilingual Albums of 2021" by the American magazine Rolling Stone, calling it "impressively textured".

== Track listing ==
All tracks are produced by Manú Jalil and Sebastián Aracena.

Seis track listing
No.	Title	Writer(s)	Length
1.	"Se Me Va a Quemar El Corazón"	Mon Laferte	3:58
2.	"Amigos Simplemente"	Laferte; David Aguilar	3:02
3.	"No Lo Vi Venir"	Laferte	3:02
4.	"Amado Mío"	Laferte; Sebastián Aracena	4:08
5.	"Canción Feliz"	Laferte; Aracena	4:24
6.	"La Mujer" (featuring Gloria Trevi)	Laferte	3:08
7.	"Calaveras"	Laferte; Aracena	4:11
8.	"Aunque Te Mueras Por Volver"	Laferte	4:10
9.	"La Democracia"	Laferte	3:25
10.	"Esta Morra No Se Vende"	Laferte	2:42
11.	"Que Se Sepa Nuestro Amor" (featuring Alejandro Fernández)	Laferte; Aguilar	3:00
12.	"Te Vi"	Laferte; Kany García	3:36
13.	"Se Va La Vida" (with the Banda Regional Femenil "Mujeres del Viento Florido")	Laferte	4:32
14.	"Se Me Va a Quemar El Corazón" (with La Arrolladora Banda El Limón de René Camacho)	Laferte	4:12
Total length:			51:34
