= Seis (disambiguation) =

Seis may refer to:

- Seis, a type of Puerto Rican dance music
- Seis am Schlern, a village in Tyrol, Italy
- Seis, a locality in Lutzhorn, Germany

SEIS may refer to:

- On-Line Encyclopedia of Integer Sequences
- Seed Enterprise Investment Scheme
- Seismic Experiment for Interior Structure, a scientific instrument on board the InSight Mars lander
- SEIS (album), by Mon Laferte (2021); see Mon Laferte discography

== See also ==
- Sei (disambiguation)
- Seix
