= Femme Fatale (Mon Laferte album) =

Studio album by Mon Laferte
- Released: 24 October 2025
- Genres: Jazz; bolero; Latin soul
- Length: 52:09
- Languages: Spanish; English
- Label: Sony Music Latin
- Producers: Mon Laferte; Manú Jalil

Mon Laferte chronology
Autopoiética (2023)	Femme Fatale (2025)	Femme Fatale Vol. 2 (2026)

Singles from Femme Fatale
- 1. "Otra Noche de Llorar" Released: 27 March 2025; 2. "Esto Es Amor" Released: 24 July 2025; 3. "La Tirana" Released: 18 September 2025; 4. "Melancolía" Released: 15 November 2025; 5. "Femme Fatale" Released: 14 May 2026

Femme Fatale is the tenth studio album by Chilean Mexican singer-songwriter Mon Laferte, released on 24 October 2025 through Sony Music Latin. It was her first album released through the label and was produced by Laferte and longtime collaborator Manú Jalil.

The album incorporates jazz, bolero, and Latin soul, among others. Its fourteen tracks explore love, heartbreak, sexuality, abuse, trauma, loneliness, aging and Laferte's relationship with the femme fatale archetype. It features collaborations with Conociendo Rusia, Nathy Peluso, Tiago Iorc, Natalia Lafourcade and Silvana Estrada. The album was followed by Femme Fatale Vol. 2 in 2026.

== Background ==
Following the release of Autopoiética in 2023, Laferte ended her nearly decade-long relationship with Universal Music México. In February 2024, she released the song "Obra de Dios" independently before beginning her association with Sony Music Latin.

Laferte developed Femme Fatale while listening extensively to jazz musicians including Charlie Parker and Miles Davis. She initially conceived the project as a jazz album, although it later expanded to incorporate pop, Latin music, bolero and orchestral arrangements. Laferte described the record as calmer, darker and more personal than her previous work, adding that several of its songs were sufficiently intimate that she felt uncomfortable listening to them in the presence of other people. "Veracruz" was written about the same person who inspired her 2014 song "Tu falta de querer", approximately a decade after the earlier composition.

The album's musical and visual direction was partly influenced by Laferte's performance as Sally Bowles in a Mexico City production of the 2025 musical Cabaret. Laferte interpreted the femme fatale archetype as representing women who were historically regarded as dangerous because they were independent, sexually liberated and unwilling to conform to expectations concerning marriage and domestic life.

== Promotion ==
=== Singles ===
"Otra Noche de Llorar" was released as the album's lead single on 27 March 2025. Its accompanying music video was directed by Camila Grandi and depicts Laferte painting while adopting an image influenced by classic Hollywood performers.

"Esto Es Amor", a collaboration with Argentine musician Conociendo Rusia, was released as the second single on 24 July 2025. The song combines soul and orchestral pop and was accompanied by a music video.

"La Tirana", featuring Argentine singer Nathy Peluso, followed on 18 September 2025. The song was written by Laferte and Peluso as a tribute to Cuban singer La Lupe. Its music video, directed by Grandi, incorporates imagery influenced by cabaret, vaudeville and the film Gentlemen Prefer Blondes.

"Melancolía" was released as the fourth single on 15 November 2025. Its music video, filmed in Valparaíso, features Chilean actor Francisco Reyes.

The title track was released as the fifth single on 14 May 2026. Its accompanying music video was filmed in New York City during the album's promotional campaign.

=== Tour ===
Laferte supported the album with the Femme Fatale Tour, which began in Latin America in 2026. On 24 March 2026, she announced an initial 28-date North American leg covering the United States and Canada.

The North American leg was scheduled to begin on 24 July 2026 at Place Bell in Laval, Quebec, and initially conclude on 7 November at the Kia Forum in Inglewood, California. A second Kia Forum concert was subsequently added for 8 November.

== Critical reception ==
Professional ratings
Review scores
Source	Rating
AllMusic	4.5/5 stars
Jenesaispop	8/10
The Needle Drop	8/10
Pitchfork	7.6/10

Femme Fatale received positive reviews from music critics, who praised Laferte's vocal performances, orchestral arrangements and combination of jazz, bolero, soul and cabaret influences.

Thom Jurek of AllMusic interpreted the album as a feminist reclamation of the femme fatale archetype. He praised its autobiographical songwriting, cultural references and elaborate arrangements, describing it as one of Laferte's most sophisticated and adventurous recordings.

Fernando García of Jenesaispop described the album as a return to a more traditional version of Laferte following the stylistic experimentation of Autopoiética. He interpreted the record as a character study encompassing desire, jealousy, sexuality, melancholy and everyday life.

Pitchfork writer Stefanie Fernández praised Laferte's ability to move between restrained singing, theatrical phrasing and vocal extremes. Fernández highlighted "1:30" for disrupting the album's slower bolero and ballad structure with free jazz and spoken word and described "La Tirana" as transforming romantic suffering into celebration.

Anthony Fantano, reviewing the album for The Needle Drop, praised its vocal performances and instrumentation. He considered the record an impressive interpretation of jazz, soul and traditional pop, although he felt that Laferte could have experimented further with the styles explored on the album.

== Track listing ==
All tracks are written by Mon Laferte, except where noted.

Femme Fatale track listing
No.	Title	Writer(s)	Length
1.	"Femme Fatale"		4:10
2.	"Mi Hombre"	Maurice Yvain; Jacques Charles; Albert Willemetz	3:17
3.	"Otra Noche de Llorar"		3:39
4.	"Esto Es Amor" (with Conociendo Rusia)	Laferte; Mateo Sujatovich	4:33
5.	"Veracruz"		4:22
6.	"El Gran Señor"		3:23
7.	"Las Flores Que Dejaste en la Mesa"		3:29
8.	"1:30"	Laferte; Emilio Reyna; Aarón Cruz; Gabriel Puentes	2:40
9.	"La Tirana" (with Nathy Peluso)	Laferte; Peluso	4:04
10.	"Hasta Que Nos Despierte la Soledad" (with Tiago Iorc)	Laferte; Iorc	3:47
11.	"Melancolía"		3:50
12.	"Ocupa Mi Piel"		3:45
13.	"My One and Only Love" (with Natalia Lafourcade and Silvana Estrada)		3:01
14.	"Vida Normal"		4:09
Total length:			52:09

== Certifications ==
Certifications for "Femme Fatale"
Region	Certification	Certified units/sales
Mexico (AMPROFON)	Gold	70,000^{‡}
^{‡} Sales+streaming figures based on certification alone.
