= Autopoiética Tour =

2024 concert tour by Mon Laferte

- Concert by Mon Laferte
- Promotional poster for the tour
- Location: North America; South America; Central America; Europe
- Associated album: Autopoiética
- Start date: February 29, 2024
- End date: November 23, 2024
- Legs: 7
- No. of shows: 54
- Supporting act: Ximena Sariñana

Mon Laferte concert chronology
- Mon Laferte: Gira Mundial (2022); Autopoiética Tour (2024); Femme Fatale Tour (2026)

The Autopoiética Tour was a concert tour by Chilean-Mexican singer-songwriter Mon Laferte in support of her eight studio album, Autopoiética (2023). It began on February 29, 2024, in Puebla, Mexico, with shows across the Americas and Europe, and concluded in Viña del Mar, Chile, on November 23, after 54 shows.

== Setlist ==
The following set list was obtained from the concert held on March 21, 2024, at the Palacio de los Deportes in Mexico City, Mexico. It does not represent all concerts for the duration of the tour.

Act I

1. "Tenochtitlán"
2. "Te juro que volveré"
3. "Obra de Dios"

Act II

4. "No + Sad"
5. "Metamorfosis"
6. "Autopoiética"

Act III

7. "Tormento"
8. "Aunque te mueras por volver"
9. "Antes de ti"
10. "Flaco"
11. "Mi buen amor"

Act IV

12. "Quédate esta noche"
13. "Préndele fuego"
14. "40 y MM"
15. "Pornocracia"
16. "Calaveras"
17. "La mujer"
18. "Por qué me fui a enamorar de ti"
19. "Amantes suicidas"
20. "El mambo"

Act V

21. "Se me va a quemar el corazón"
22. "Funeral"
23. "El cristal"
24. "La trenza"
25. "Si tú me quisieras"
26. "Pa’ dónde se fue"
27. "Primaveral"

Act VI

28. "Cumbia para olvidar"
29. "El beso"
30. "Amárrame"

Act VII

31. "Block 16"
32. "Men shiny"
33. "A crying diamond"
34. "Amor completo"
35. "Tu falta de querer"

Encore

36. "Casta diva"

== Tour dates ==
List of 2024 concerts, showing date, city, country, venue, attendance and gross revenue
Date (2024)	City	Country	Venue	Opening act	Attendance	Revenue
February 29	Puebla	Mexico	Auditorio GNP Seguros	—N/a	—N/a	—N/a
March 3	Toluca	Mexico	Teatro Morelos	—N/a	—N/a	—N/a
March 6	Querétaro	Mexico	Auditorio Josefa Ortiz De Domínguez	—N/a	—N/a	—N/a
March 8	Monterrey	Mexico	Auditorio Citibanamex	—N/a	—N/a	—N/a
March 10	Tijuana	Mexico	Audiorama El Trompo	—N/a	—N/a	—N/a
March 15	Mérida	Mexico	Foro GNP Seguros	—N/a	—N/a	—N/a
March 20	Guadalajara	Mexico	Auditorio Telmex	—N/a	—N/a	—N/a
March 21	Mexico City	Mexico	Palacio de los Deportes	—N/a	—N/a	—N/a
April 2	Montevideo	Uruguay	Antel Arena	—N/a	—N/a	—N/a
April 4	Buenos Aires	Argentina	Movistar Arena	—N/a	—N/a	—N/a
April 6	Rosario	Argentina	Metropolitano Rosario	—N/a	—N/a	—N/a
April 8	Antofagasta	Chile	Estadio Sokol	—N/a	—N/a	—N/a
April 10	Santiago	Chile	Movistar Arena	—N/a	—N/a	—N/a
April 12	Concepción	Chile	Suractivo	—N/a	—N/a	—N/a
April 18	Quito	Ecuador	Coliseo General Rumiñahui	—N/a	—N/a	—N/a
April 20	Bogotá	Colombia	Movistar Arena	—N/a	—N/a	—N/a
April 21	Medellín	Colombia	Teatro Metropolitano José Gutiérrez Gómez	—N/a	—N/a	—N/a
April 23	San José	Costa Rica	Estadio Nacional	—N/a	—N/a	—N/a
April 25	Tegucigalpa	Honduras	Nacional De Ingenieros Coliseum	—N/a	—N/a	—N/a
April 27	Guatemala City	Guatemala	Forum Majadas	—N/a	—N/a	—N/a
April 30	Managua	Nicaragua	Polideportivo Alexis Argüello	—N/a	—N/a	—N/a
May 2	Rosemont (Note: Billed as Chicago.)	United States	Rosemont Theatre	Ximena Sariñana	—N/a	—N/a
May 5	Boston	United States	Orpheum Theatre	Ximena Sariñana	—N/a	—N/a
May 7	New York City	United States	The Theater at Madison Square Garden	Ximena Sariñana	—N/a	—N/a
May 9	Cumberland (Note: Billed as Atlanta.)	United States	Coca-Cola Roxy	Ximena Sariñana	—N/a	—N/a
May 10	Lake Buena Vista	United States	House of Blues	Ximena Sariñana	—N/a	—N/a
May 12	Miami Beach (Note: Billed as Miami.)	United States	The Fillmore Miami Beach	Ximena Sariñana	—N/a	—N/a
May 15	McAllen	United States	McAllen Performing Arts Center	Ximena Sariñana	—N/a	—N/a
May 16	Austin	United States	Moody Amphitheater	Ximena Sariñana	—N/a	—N/a
May 17	Sugar Land (Note: Billed as Hidalgo.)	United States	Smart Financial Centre	Ximena Sariñana	—N/a	—N/a
May 19	Irving	United States	The Pavilion at Toyota Music Factory	Ximena Sariñana	—N/a	—N/a
May 22	El Paso	United States	El Paso County Coliseum	Ximena Sariñana	—N/a	—N/a
May 24	Inglewood	United States	Kia Forum	Ximena Sariñana	—N/a	—N/a
May 25	San Francisco	United States	SF Masonic Auditorium	Ximena Sariñana	—N/a	—N/a
May 26	San Diego	United States	Gallagher Square	Ximena Sariñana	—N/a	—N/a
May 28	Phoenix	United States	Arizona Financial Theatre	Ximena Sariñana	—N/a	—N/a
May 31	Seattle	United States	Paramount Theatre	Ximena Sariñana	—N/a	—N/a
June 2 (Note: The concert in Napa on June 2, 2024, is part of La Onda Music Festival.)	Napa	United States	Napa Valley Expo	—N/a	—N/a	—N/a
July 6 (Note: The concert in Santiago de Compostela on July 6, 2024, is part of O Gozo Festival.)	Santiago de Compostela	Spain	Auditorio Monte do Gozo	—N/a	—N/a	—N/a
July 8	Berlin	Germany	Theater des Westens	—N/a	—N/a	—N/a
July 10	Paris	France	L'Olympia	—N/a	—N/a	—N/a
July 11	Amsterdam	Netherlands	Melkweg	—N/a	—N/a	—N/a
July 12	London	England	Electric Brixton	—N/a	—N/a	—N/a
July 15	Zurich	Switzerland	Kaufleuten	—N/a	—N/a	—N/a
July 18	Stockholm	Sweden	Bems	—N/a	—N/a	—N/a
July 21	Fuengirola	Spain	Marenostrum Castle Park	—N/a	—N/a	—N/a
July 23	Barcelona	Spain	Razzmatazz	—N/a	—N/a	—N/a
July 25	Madrid	Spain	La Riviera	—N/a	—N/a	—N/a
July 26	Madrid	Spain	La Riviera	—N/a	—N/a	—N/a
July 28	Lanuza	Spain	Auditorio Natural	—N/a	—N/a	—N/a
July 29	Valencia	Spain	Jardins de Vivers	—N/a	—N/a	—N/a
October 5	Ciudad Juárez	Mexico	Hipódromo Ciudad Juárez	—N/a	—N/a	—N/a
October 23	Mexico City	Mexico	Auditorio Nacional	—N/a	—N/a	—N/a
November 23 (Note: The concert in Viña del Mar on November 23 was originally scheduled to take place on April 13, 2024, but it was rescheduled due to logistical issues.)	Viña Del Mar	Chile	Quinta Vergara Amphitheater	—N/a	—N/a	—N/a
