= 1940 Carmen =

Studio album by Mon Laferte
- Released: 29 October 2021
- Recorded: March–July 2021
- Genre: Latin pop; alternative rock
- Length: 39:51
- Language: Spanish; English
- Label: Universal
- Producer: Mon Laferte

Mon Laferte chronology
Seis (2021)	1940 Carmen (2021)	Autopoiética (2023)

Singles from 1940 Carmen
- 1. "Algo es Mejor" Released: 1 October 2021

1940 Carmen is the eighth studio album by Chilean Mexican singer-songwriter Mon Laferte, released on 29 October 2021 through Universal Music México. It was produced by Laferte herself and includes songs both in Spanish and English.

The album was conceived during Laferte's pregnancy and was composed in Los Angeles, United States at an Airbnb where she lived at the time, the name of the album is the address of the apartment where she lived while the cover art is a close-up selfie taken by Laferte in front of a mirror. It received a nomination for Best Latin Rock or Alternative Album at the 65th Annual Grammy Awards, becoming Laferte's second nomination in the ceremony.

== Background ==
Following the release of "Algo es Mejor" in October 2021, the first single of the album, Laferte announced 1940 Carmen as her next project set to be released later in the year. The album was released on 29 October 2021, being her second project released on 2021 after SEIS, released on April. From March 2021 to July of the same year, Laferte lived at an Airbnb in Los Angeles, United States, where she learnt she was pregnant and recorded the album.

Laferte had been trying to get pregnant for a year and found out that when she had undergone radiation for thyroid cancer in 2009, her ovaries had been affected, she started taking hormones as part of her fertility treatment which impacted on her songwriting for the album. Laferte said that "it was a daily shot of hormones and I was very sensitive. Everything I've written or done doesn't really have much of a plan, it was explosive of me to want to make a record".

== Music and lyrics ==
1940 Carmen was composed and produced by Laferte herself during the four months she lived in Los Angeles and was influenced by the treatment she was going through in order to get pregnant. It features a more minimalistic sound compared to her previous album, the Mexican music-inspired Seis, and has more introspective and intimate lyrics. The instrumentation is also more acoustic that her previous projects with the guitar as the main instrument for many of the songs. The album draws influences from American music like 1960s pop music in "Placer Hollywood", folk rock in "Good Boy" and country-blues in "A Crying Diamond". It also includes songs in English like "Good Boy", "A Crying Diamond" and "Beautiful Sadness".

It deals with themes of love, change and maternity, being an "autobiographic" album, the song "Supermercado" ("Supermarket") was inspired in an argument that Laferte had with her partner in a supermarket while the songs "Algo es Mejor" ("Something is Better") and "Niña" ("Girl") deal with her longing to become a mother; both songs were written before she was pregnant, the former song was conceived while Laferte was driving through Malibu and thought for her desires to become pregnant. The song "A Crying Diamond" deals with the experience of abuse Laferte suffered when she was a teenager which, according to her, the hormones she was taking allowed her to write about more intimate topics. She additionally said that "it's something that I think I would never have dared to make a song or tell about, but I was so hypersensitive that I wrote that song".

== Promotion ==
The song "Algo es Mejor" was released as a single on 1 October 2021, alongside a music video. On 9 June 2022, a music video for "Supermercado", directed by Camila Grandi, was also released to promote the album. Additionally, several live performance videos were released for different songs from the album like "A Crying Diamond", which featured backing vocals and instrumentation from musicians Renee, arroba nat, Bratty and Cancamusa.

== Critical reception ==
Professional ratings
Review scores
Source	Rating
AllMusic	4/5 stars
Indie Rocks!	7/10
Mondo Sonoro	7/10 stars

Thom Jurek from AllMusic gave the album four out of five stars, writing that "it reflects Laferte's particular gifts as a songwriter capable of juxtaposing conflicting, even contradictory emotions and psychological states as well as imbuing physical landscapes and personal interactions, no matter how brief and/or casual, with profound implications", he also commented that "though a 180-degree turn from the Mexican regional music employed on Seis, 1940 Carmen is every bit its equal in creativity, emotional depth, and execution".

Rodrigo Derbez from Indie Rocks! gave the album a seven out of ten, writing that while it has high points like "Supermercado" and "A Crying Diamond", the album was not as innovative or fresh as Seis, he finished the review with "1940 Carmen is an experience that feels well prepared, much more with a commercial intention than an artistic one, although it doesn't mean that there isn't any heart in this album either, it just feels so clean it's sterile".

== Track listing ==
All tracks are written and produced by Mon Laferte

1940 Carmen track listing
No.	Title	Length
1.	"Placer Hollywood"	3:39
2.	"Algo es Mejor"	4:00
3.	"Good Boy"	5:16
4.	"Supermercado"	3:34
5.	"Niña"	4:23
6.	"Beautiful Sadness"	3:21
7.	"Química Mayor"	3:51
8.	"A Crying Diamond"	4:36
9.	"No Soy Para Ti"	3:31
10.	"Zombie"	3:35
Total length:		39:51
