= Plata Ta Tá =

2019 song by Mon Laferte and Guaynaa

Single by Mon Laferte and Guaynaa
- Language: Spanish
- Released: 15 November 2019
- Recorded: 2019
- Genre: Reggaeton
- Length: 4:15
- Label: Universal Music Mexico
- Songwriters: Mon Laferte; Guaynaa
- Producer: Manu Jalil

Mon Laferte singles chronology
"Paisaje Japonés" (2019)	"Plata Ta Tá" (2019)

Music video
- "Plata Ta Tá" on YouTube

"Plata Ta Tá" is a protest song by Chilean Mexican singer-songwriter Mon Laferte and Puerto Rican rapper Guaynaa written as a response to repression by government at the 2019-2020 Chilean protests. It was released on 15 November 2019 through Universal Music Group as a non-single album. The song was written by Laferte and Guaynaa, and it was produced by Manu Jalil. A music video was released on 5 December 2019, featuring Guaynaa and Mexican actress Yalitza Aparicio.

== Background ==
Mon Laferte announced the release of "Plata Ta Tá" on 14 November 2019, the same day the 20th Annual Latin Grammy Awards were celebrated and her album Norma won in the category Best Alternative Music Album. Laferte uncovered her breast with the phrase "En Chile torturan, violan y matan" (In Chile they torture, rape and kill) in response to the repression to Chilean protesters by the government.

Rolling Stone said that the song title, "Plata Ta Tá", "is a play on the sounds of a "cacerolazo", or a Latin American style of protest in which people bang on pots and pans", calling the song a "perreo combativo".

The single cover shows Laferte topless, wearing only a kerchief (similar to her topless at the Grammy Awards) with the hashtag #AbortoLegalYa (Legal Abort Now), supporting the feminist movement.

== Composition and lyrics ==
"Plata Ta Tá" is a reggaeton song, written and performed by Mon Laferte and Guaynaa. The track runs at 95 BPM and is in the key of E minor. Its production was handled by Manu Jalil and it runs at four minutes and fifteen seconds.

The song is about "Latin America enormous inequality in the distribution of wealth and the pauperization of the middle and lower classes". In the lines "¿Pa’ qué? Si tú me lo quitaste", Laferte refers to Chilean President Sebastián Piñera. Lyrics also contain references to Mapuche community, feminist community, Shakira's "La Tortura", and US President Donald Trump, also including profanity.

== Music video ==
The music video for "Plata Ta Tá" was premiered on 5 December 2019, it was recorded in Pachuca, Hidalgo, Mexico, and directed by The Broducers. The clip features Mon Laferte, Guaynaa and Mexican actress Yalitza Aparicio walking down the streets of Pachuca, wearing colorful clothes and dancing at the rhythm of reggaeton.

The music video is dedicated to the 2019-2020 Chilean protests.

== Personnel ==
Credits adapted from "Plata Ta Tá" liner notes.

Vocals

- Mon Laferte – lead vocals
- Guaynaa – lead vocals

Musicians

- Rulo – percussion, bass guitar
- Manu Jalil – percussion, vocal arrangements, synthesizer
- Sebastián Aracena – charango
- Pachi Gutierrez – percussion
- Omar Rafla – clarinet, saxophone
- Ignacio Sánchez "El Mulu" – vocal arrangements

Production

- Manu Jalil – production, recording, programming
- Pepe Navarro – mastering, mixing
- Herman Araujo – recording

== Charts ==
Weekly chart performance for "Plata Ta Tá"
Chart (2019)	Peak position
Chile Nacional (Monitor Latino)	10
Mexico Pop (Monitor Latino)	18
