= Amor (Los Auténticos Decadentes song) =

2018 song by Los Auténticos Decadentes

Single by Los Auténticos Decadentes featuring Mon Laferte

from the album Fiesta Nacional (MTV Unplugged)
- Language: Spanish
- Released: 20 July 2018
- Recorded: 2014
- Genre: Pop rock; Latin pop
- Length: 5:12
- Label: PopArt
- Songwriter: Jorge Serrano
- Producers: Los Auténticos Decadentes; Gustavo Borner; Moska Lorenzo; Mariano Franceschelli

Mon Laferte singles chronology
"Invéntame" (2018)	"Amor" (2018)	"El Beso" (2018)

Music video
- "Amor" on YouTube

"Amor" is a song by Argentine band Los Auténticos Decadentes, originally released in 2000 as part of their seventh studio album Hoy trasnoche. In 2018 they released a single featuring Chilean Mexican singer-songwriter Mon Laferte, which was released on 20 July 2018 through PopArt as part of Los Auténticos Decadentes live album Fiesta Nacional (MTV Unplugged). The song was written by Jorge Serrano and produced by Los Auténticos Decadentes, Gustavo Borner, Moska Lorenzo and Mariano Franceschelli.

== Personnel ==
Credits adapted from "Amor" liner notes.

Vocals

- Mon Laferte – lead vocals

Los Auténticos Decadentes

- Gustavo "Cucho" Parisi – vocals
- Jorge Serrano – guitars, vocals, choirs and pinkillo
- Diego Demarco – guitars, vocals, choirs
- Nito Montecchia – guitars, choirs
- Gastón "Francés" Bernardou – percussion, effects and synthesisers
- Martín "La Mosca" Lorenzo – percussion and choirs
- Daniel Zimbello – trombone
- Pablo Armesto – bass guitar and choirs
- Pablo Rodriguez – saxophone, flute and pincullo
- Eduardo Tripodi – percussion and choirs
- Mariano Franceschelli – drums, bass guitar, percussion and choirs
- Guillermo "Capanga" Eijo – trumpet and choirs

Production

- Los Auténticos Decadentes – production
- Gustavo Borner – production
- Moska Lorenzo – production
- Mariano Franceschelli – production

== Charts ==
=== Weekly charts ===
Weekly chart performance for "Amor"
Chart (2018)	Peak position
Argentina (Monitor Latino)	1
Chile (Monitor Latino)	6
Chile Pop (Monitor Latino)	3

=== Year-end charts ===
2018 year-end chart performance for "Amor"
Chart (2018)	Position
Argentina (Monitor Latino)	21
Chile (Monitor Latino)	91
Chile Pop (Monitor Latino)	34
Uruguay (Monitor Latino)	93
Uruguay Pop (Monitor Latino)	12

2019 year-end chart performance for "Amor"
Chart (2019)	Position
Argentina (Monitor Latino)	9
Bolivia (Monitor Latino)	81
Chile Pop (Monitor Latino)	48
Uruguay (Monitor Latino)	86
Uruguay Pop (Monitor Latino)	13
