= Amárrame =

2017 song by Mon Laferte

Single by Mon Laferte featuring Juanes

from the album La Trenza
- Language: Spanish
- Released: 10 February 2017
- Recorded: 2016
- Genre: Cumbia; Latin pop
- Length: 3:25
- Label: Universal
- Songwriter: Mon Laferte
- Producers: Mon Laferte; Manuel Soto

Mon Laferte singles chronology
| "Yo Te Qui" (2017) | "Amárrame" (2017) | "Mi Buen Amor" (2017) |

Music video
- "Amárrame" on YouTube

"Amárrame" (English: Tie Me Up) is a song by Chilean Mexican singer-songwriter Mon Laferte featuring Colombian singer Juanes. It released on 10 February 2017 through Universal Music Group as part of Laferte's fifth studio album La Trenza. The song was written by Laferte, produced by herself and Manuel Soto.

The song reached number two in Chile, only after Luis Fonsi's "Despacito", becoming her second best-ranking song after "El Beso", and also reached number two in Mexico, becoming her best-ranking song on that chart. It also became a success in Latin American pop charts. "Amárrame" won the Latin Grammy Award for Best Alternative Song in 2017. It was also nominated for Record of the Year and Song of the Year.

== Background ==
The song originally was written in 2015 originally for her previous album Mon Laferte Vol. 1, but she decided not to include it because she felt the album was complete. When she was recording her fifth studio album, La Trenza, she decided to put "Amárrame" in it. and when Universal Music asked her if she wanted to sing it alone or with someone, Laferte said she would like to record the song with Juanes. Then, Laferte went to Miami to meet Juanes and they decided to record the song and music video in that city.

The song was released as single on 10 February 2017, publishing the music video on MTV and later on the platform VEVO. Simultaneously, the song "Yo Te Qui" was released, available on download format and streaming platforms.

The single cover is featured on the first shots of the song's music video.

== Composition ==
"Amárrame" is a song written by Mon Laferte and interpreted by herself featuring Juanes, being described as a cumbia and Latin pop song, with elements of Andean music. The track runs at 180 BPM and is in the key of F minor. It runs at three minutes and 27 seconds.

== Critical reception ==
Marisa Arbona-Ruiz of NPR referred to "Amárrame" as a "crazy-sexy song", adding that it "barely reflects the full range of her voice or the diverse artistry that runs throughout this delicious album".

== Commercial performance ==
On the day of its release the single debuted as the best-selling iTunes song in Mexico, Chile, Costa Rica, Ecuador, Colombia and Bolivia. In addition, prior to the release "Amárrame" became in a few hours on Trending Topic on the Twitter platform and then on YouTube Trend on her native country.

"Amárrame" made her the first Chilean artist to place a single among the top five trends in Spotify World and parallel to this at number 1 in Spotify Mexico and Chile simultaneously, as well as number 1 and 4 on YouTube Chile and Mexico respectively with more than six million reproductions in less than two weeks.

On 14 April 2017, the song was the most played Chilean song on radio stations in the country since its launch, with a total of 4,135 executions according to data from the SCD (Chilean Copyright Society). Moreover, from March to date, the song in collaboration with Juanes was in second place in the general ranking, which considers both Chilean and foreign music.

"Amárrame" was the most listened to Chilean song both on the radio and on Spotify in Chile during 2017.

== Accolades ==
Accolades for "Amárrame"
| Year | Organization | Award | Result | Ref. |
|---|---|---|---|---|
| 2017 | Latin Grammy Award | Best Alternative Song | Won | |
| 2017 | Latin Grammy Award | Record of the Year | Nominated | |
| 2017 | Latin Grammy Award | Song of the Year | Nominated | |

== Music video ==
A music video recorded in Miami, Florida was uploaded on February 10, 2017, showing Laferte and Juanes interpreting the song in the city streets; it features choreographies and colorful landscapes from Miami. The music video reached over 300 million views on YouTube as February 2020.

== Live performances ==
Laferte performed "Amárrame" for the first time on 2017 Viña del Mar International Song Festival on February 25. Then she performed along with Juanes on the 2017 Vive Latino Festival on March 19.

== Personnel ==
Credits adapted from La Trenza liner notes.

Vocals

- Mon Laferte – lead vocals
- Juanes – lead vocals
- Esván Lemus – background vocals
- Jerry Velásquez – background vocals
- René Mooi – background vocals

Musicians

- Fermín Fortiz – bass guitar
- Ram – clarinet
- Enrique Lara – guitar
- Juanes – guitar
- Manuel Soto – guitar, organ
- Juan Molina – percussion
- Felipe Sanabria – saxophone
- Erick Rodríguez – trombone
- Humberto Sanabria – trumpet

Production

- Manuel Soto – production
- Eduardo del Águila – mixing, recording
- Alan Ortiz – recording
- Chalo González – recording
- Dave Poler – recording

== Charts ==
=== Weekly charts ===
Weekly chart performance for "Amárrame"
| Chart (2017) | Peak position |
|---|---|
| Chile (Monitor Latino) | 2 |
| Mexico (Monitor Latino) | 2 |
| Mexico Airplay (Billboard) | 12 |
| Mexico Pop Español Airplay (Billboard) | 4 |
| Mexico Pop (Monitor Latino) | 2 |

=== Year-end charts ===
2017 year-end chart performance for "Amárrame"
| Chart (2017) | Position |
|---|---|
| Bolivia (Monitor Latino) | 70 |
| Chile (Monitor Latino) | 2 |
| Chile Pop (Monitor Latino) | 2 |
| Guatemala Pop (Monitor Latino) | 73 |
| México (Monitor Latino) | 15 |
| México Pop (Monitor Latino) | 9 |
| Nicaragua Pop (Monitor Latino) | 85 |
| Panama Pop (Monitor Latino) | 66 |
| Perú (Monitor Latino) | 81 |
| Venezuela Pop (Monitor Latino) | 72 |

2018 year-end chart performance for "Amárrame"
| Chart (2018) | Position |
|---|---|
| Chile (Monitor Latino) | 22 |
| Chile Pop (Monitor Latino) | 11 |

2019 year-end chart performance for "Amárrame"
| Chart (2019) | Position |
|---|---|
| Chile (Monitor Latino) | 57 |
| Chile Pop (Monitor Latino) | 25 |

== Certifications ==
Certifications for "Amárrame"
| Region | Certification | Certified units/sales |
|---|---|---|
| Mexico (AMPROFON) | Diamond+2× Platinum+Gold | 450,000^{‡} |
Streaming
| Chile (Profovi) | Platinum | 8,000,000 |
^{‡} Sales+streaming figures based on certification alone.
