= El Beso (Mon Laferte song) =

2018 song by Mon Laferte

Single by Mon Laferte

from the album Norma
- Released: 7 September 2018
- Recorded: 2018
- Studio: Capitol Studios (Los Angeles, California)
- Genre: Salsa; cumbia; Latin pop
- Length: 2:59
- Label: Universal
- Songwriters: Mon Laferte; Héctor Lavoe; Willie Colón
- Producer: Omar Rodríguez-López

Mon Laferte singles chronology
"Amor" (2018)	"El Beso" (2018)	"Por Qué Me Fui a Enamorar de Ti" (2018)

Music video
- "El Beso" on YouTube

"El Beso" is a song by Chilean Mexican singer-songwriter Mon Laferte released on 7 September 2018 through Universal Music Group as part of her fifth studio album Norma. The song was written by Laferte, Héctor Lavoe and Willie Colón and produced by Omar Rodríguez-López. It was a success in Chile and Mexico, topped the Chile Monitor Latino chart, becoming her first number one and best-ranking song on the chart, and also reached number 6 in Mexico in Monitor Latino chart, becoming her second best-ranking song on that chart, after "Amárrame".

== Background ==
"El Beso" is a salsa song mixed with other Latin American rhythms, it was released on September 7, publishing the music video on her VEVO platform. On the day of its release, the single debuted in the best-selling iTunes tracks in several Latin American countries, in addition to reaching the number one trend in both Chile and Mexico.

The recording of "El Beso" was made in a single shot, in the legendary studios of the Capitol Records Building, in Los Angeles, California. The production of "El Beso" has been carried out by Omar Rodríguez-López. The recording of "El Beso" was reinforced with the participation of a section of 5 metals, two percussions, drums, two guitars, keyboard and bass, in addition to the personal voice of Mon Laferte.

"El Beso" became the first song of Mon Laferte to reach number one on the radio charts of Mexico and Chile, in addition to becoming his first single to enter the popularity charts of Argentina at number 71.

== Composition and lyrics ==
"El Beso" has been described as a cumbia, mambo and salsa song. The track runs at 103 BPM and is in the key of E minor. It runs at two minutes and 58 seconds.

The lyrics address the situation of a couple in which she asks the object of her affection for a complete and totalizing kiss, which, according to the lyrics of the song, encompasses all the sensations that such a contact can cause in the beloved, regardless of whether it is parting.

== Music video ==
The music video was directed by Sebastián Soto Chacón was recorded in Mexico and features the participation of Mexican actor Diego Luna where it shows a satire to which the painting of The Last Supper refers to where a Mon Laferte dancing to Diego on a table, accompanied by a series of dancers while they kiss and dance different Latin American rhythms.

"El Beso" music video won in the MTV Latin America Awards in the category "Video of the year".

== Personnel ==
Credits adapted from Norma liner notes.

Vocals

- Mon Laferte – lead vocals
- Sebastián Aracena – background vocals

Musicians

- David Aguilar – guitar
- Sebastián Aracena – guitar
- Francesco Marcocci – bass guitar
- Leo Genovese – organ, piano
- Daniel Rotem – flute, saxophone
- Enrique Sánchez – trumpet
- Cameron Johnson – trumpet
- Jonah Levine – trombone
- Henry Solomon – saxophone, flute
- Willy Rodríguez – percussion, drums
- Daniel Díaz – percussion
- Etienne Rivera Cabello – percussion

Production

- Omar Rodríguez-López – production, recording arrangements, programming
- Bruce Botnick – recording
- Jon Debaun – recording
- Rich Costey – mixing

Recording

- Recorded at Capitol Studios, Los Angeles, California

== Charts ==
=== Weekly charts ===
Weekly chart performance for "El Beso"
Chart (2018)	Peak position
Argentina (Argentina Hot 100)	71
Chile (Monitor Latino)	1
Chile Pop (Monitor Latino)	1
Mexico (Monitor Latino)	6
Mexico Pop (Monitor Latino)	1
Mexico Airplay (Billboard)	5
Mexico Pop Español Airplay (Billboard)	2

=== Year-end charts ===
2018 year-end chart performance for "El Beso"
Chart (2018)	Position
Chile (Monitor Latino)	58
Chile Pop (Monitor Latino)	25
Mexico Pop (Monitor Latino)	56

2019 year-end chart performance for "El Beso"
Chart (2019)	Position
Chile (Monitor Latino)	7
Chile Pop (Monitor Latino)	4
