= Femme Fatale Vol. 2 =

Studio album by Mon Laferte
- Released: 12 June 2026
- Genres: Art pop; folk; dream pop; alternative rock
- Length: 73:36
- Languages: Spanish; English
- Label: Sony Music Latin
- Producers: Mon Laferte; Manú Jalil; Rick Nowels; Joel Orta Oviedo

Mon Laferte chronology
| Femme Fatale (2025) | Femme Fatale Vol. 2 (2026) |

Singles from Femme Fatale Vol. 2
- 1. "A Pesar De Ti y De Mi" Released: 8 June 2026

Femme Fatale Vol. 2 is the eleventh studio album by Chilean Mexican singer-songwriter Mon Laferte, released on 12 June 2026 through Sony Music Latin. The followup to Femme Fatale (2025), it consists of twenty songs written during the same process as it.

The album was primarily produced by Laferte and Manú Jalil, with additional production by Rick Nowels and Joel Orta Oviedo. In contrast to the jazz and cabaret orientation of the first volume, Femme Fatale Vol. 2 incorporates art pop, alternative rock, blues, folk, punk, dream pop, and psychedelic genres and themes.

Its lyrics address emotional dependency, romantic separation, trauma, fame, motherhood, and Laferte's public and private identities. The album features collaborations with St. Vincent, Javiera Electra and GRTSCH.

== Background ==
During the creation of Femme Fatale, Laferte reviewed several years of unfinished compositions, poems, diary entries, voice recordings and notes stored on her telephone and computer. She assembled approximately fifty to sixty potential songs, including material dating to around 2016.

Fourteen songs with a stronger connection to jazz and cabaret were selected for the first volume. Laferte felt that many of the remaining compositions belonged to the same emotional and conceptual project but inhabited a different musical environment, leading her to develop them as Femme Fatale Vol. 2.

Laferte described the second volume as more eclectic, minimalist and rooted in the tradition of the singer-songwriter than its predecessor. Although the two records follow different musical paths, she considered them a complete body of work united by vulnerability, darkness and an unplanned feminist perspective.

The album introduces several recurring female archetypes, including a bride, a beauty queen, a diva and a mysterious woman. Laferte used the figures as variations of an evolving identity shaped by desire, social expectations and inherited ideas concerning femininity.

"For Your Consideration" originated from unfinished phrases and notes about Laferte's frustration with fame and the music industry. Its lyrics address capitalism, overwork and her discomfort with recognizing herself as a commercial product.

"Hello Monserrat" is structured as a conversation with Laferte's private self and discusses medication, cosmetic procedures, taxes, self-esteem and her relationship with her mother. "Por la Gracia de Dios" concerns women who have been condemned after defending themselves while travelling aboard La Bestia, the network of freight trains used by migrants travelling through Mexico.

The closing track, "Gigante", was written when Laferte was approximately 26 years old after undergoing thyroid surgery that placed her singing voice at risk. She described recovering the song years later as a healing experience and considered it an appropriate conclusion to the Femme Fatale project.

== Promotion ==
=== Singles ===
"A Pesar De Ti y De Mi" was released as the album's lead single on 8 June 2026, four days before the album. The song concerns the acceptance of a relationship's end despite the continuing love between its participants.

Its accompanying music video places Laferte in a beauty pageant whose contestants represent ideals including purity, tradition, virginity, femininity and nationalism. The narrative depicts the protagonist returning to a competition she once dominated but confronting a system that prioritizes youth and physical appearance.

=== Tour ===
The album was released during the Latin American portion of the Femme Fatale Tour. Laferte incorporated the emotional and visual world of both volumes into the production, which combined cabaret staging, theatrical performance and cinematic visual elements.

The tour's North American leg was scheduled to begin on 24 July 2026 at Place Bell in Laval, Quebec, and visit the United States and Canada.

== Critical reception ==
Femme Fatale Vol. 2 received positive reviews from music critics, who praised its stylistic range, vocal performances and distinction from the first volume.

Felipe Retamal of La Tercera praised the album's refusal to organize its twenty songs around a single genre. He highlighted the atmospheric progression of "No Le Regales Tu Corazón", the punk performance of "Tal Vez Yo Soy El Problema" and Laferte's collaborations with St. Vincent and Javiera Electra. Retamal called it a very good album and compared its artistic boldness to Autopoiética.

Fernando García of Jenesaispop noted the album abandons the first volume's combination of jazz and Latin popular song in favor of art pop and alternative rock. García praised Laferte's vocal versatility and described the record as a cohesive work with its own identity rather than a collection of discarded songs.

Dany Mireles of The Luna Collective described the album as an emotionally rich exploration of acceptance, identity, family wounds and the need to leave certain forms of love behind. Mireles particularly praised the record's willingness to embrace contradiction and considered it one of Laferte's most intimate works.

NPR Music's Alt.Latino dedicated an episode to the record titled "Mon Laferte's captivating coda". Presenter Felix Contreras described Laferte as being amid one of the most remarkable creative periods he had witnessed.

== Track listing ==
All tracks are written by Mon Laferte, except where noted. All tracks are produced by Laferte and Manú Jalil, except where noted.

Femme Fatale Vol. 2 track listing
| No. | Title | Writer(s) | Producer(s) | Length |
|---|---|---|---|---|
| 1. | "For Your Consideration" | | | 3:01 |
| 2. | "A Pesar De Ti y De Mi" | | | 4:09 |
| 3. | "No Le Regales Tu Corazón" | | | 9:31 |
| 4. | "Sunset Boulevard" | | | 3:44 |
| 5. | "While I'll Keep Writing Songs for You" (with St. Vincent) | | | 2:59 |
| 6. | "Hello Monserrat" | | | 4:07 |
| 7. | "Irracional Cervical" | | | 3:51 |
| 8. | "Tal Vez Yo Soy El Problema" | | Laferte; Joel Orta Oviedo | 1:15 |
| 9. | "Eterno Resplandor De Una Mente Sin Recuerdos" (featuring Javiera Electra) | | | 2:40 |
| 10. | "Por La Gracia De Dios" | | | 4:58 |
| 11. | "Vuelve A Casa" | | | 3:25 |
| 12. | "Estoy Llorando De Tanta Belleza" | | | 3:16 |
| 13. | "Yo Te Amo Y Tú Lo Intentas" | Laferte; Rick Nowels | Laferte; Nowels | 3:18 |
| 14. | "Reino De Amor" | Laferte; Nowels | Laferte; Nowels | 3:14 |
| 15. | "Quién Soy Yo Cuando No Estoy Contigo" (featuring GRTSCH) | Laferte; GRTSCH | | 3:19 |
| 16. | "Es Tan Sabio Nuestro Amor" | Laferte; Linda Perry | | 3:42 |
| 17. | "Racimos y Glaciares" | | | 2:49 |
| 18. | "Vi Un Poema En Su Locura" | | | 3:31 |
| 19. | "Mary" | Laferte; Perry | | 2:45 |
| 20. | "Gigante" | | | 4:02 |
| Total length: | | | | 73:36 |
