= Desechable =

2011 studio album by Mon Laferte

Studio album by Mon Laferte
- Released: 23 June 2011
- Recorded: 2009–2011
- Genre: Latin pop; pop rock; Latin ballad
- Length: 34:49
- Language: Spanish
- Label: Independent
- Producer: César Ceja

Mon Laferte chronology
La Chica de Rojo (2003)	Desechable (2011)	Tornasol (2013)

Singles from Desechable
- 1. "Soy" Released: 31 May 2011; 2. "Depresión" Released: 22 July 2011; 3. "Tóxico" Released: 1 November 2011; 4. "Desechable" Released: 24 February 2012; 5. "Un Solo Hombre No Puedo Tener" Released: 18 July 2012

Desechable is the second studio album by Chilean Mexican singer-songwriter Mon Laferte, released on 23 June 2011. It was released eight years after her debut album La Chica de Rojo in 2003. The album was published independently by Laferte after two years of recording in Mexico.

== Background ==
After the release of her first album, La Chica de Rojo, under the name Monserrat Bustamante, she moved in 2007 to Mexico City where she began singing in nightclubs and recording cover songs. In 2009, she released a single titled "Lo Mismo Que Yo", which was to be the lead single from an upcoming album. The same year, Laferte was diagnosed with thyroid cancer, effectively putting a halt to her album.

Around the time of her battle with cancer, she abandoned her original stage name and introduced the world to Mon Laferte, expressing that the name represented a new beginning for her: "My name change is not for wanting to be another person, it is that the circumstances of life have led me to change a lot and I felt that I had to start from scratch". In late 2010, two years later, she returned with the recording of her second album, Desechable, which was released on 23 June 2011 digitally. The album was recorded in Testa Estudio, León, Guanajuato with producer César Ceja.

== Track listing ==
All tracks are written by Mon Laferte and César Ceja, except where noted.

Desechable track listing
No.	Title	Length
1.	"Soy"	3:28
2.	"Un Solo Hombre No Puedo Tener"	3:09
3.	"Depresión"	3:58
4.	"Culpable" (duet with Sol Ange)	2:49
5.	"Te Vas"	4:15
6.	"No"	3:16
7.	"Desechable" (Mon Laferte, César Ceja, Michelle Álvarez, Ángela Dávalos)	3:48
8.	"Tóxico"	3:25
9.	"Te Quiero"	3:39
10.	"Él" (Laferte)	3:21
Total length:		34:49
