= Norma (album) =

2018 studio album by Mon Laferte

Studio album by Mon Laferte
- Released: 9 November 2018
- Recorded: 16 June 2018
- Studio: Capitol (Hollywood)
- Genre: Latin pop; salsa; Latin ballad
- Length: 36:40
- Language: Spanish
- Label: Universal
- Producer: Omar Rodríguez-López

Mon Laferte chronology
La Trenza (2017)	Norma (2018)	Seis (2021)

Singles from Norma
- 1. "El Beso" Released: 7 September 2018; 2. "Por Qué Me Fui a Enamorar de Ti" Released: 5 October 2018; 3. "El Mambo" Released: 10 November 2018; 4. "Caderas Blancas" Released: 17 December 2018; 5. "Funeral" Released: 26 February 2019; 6. "Cumbia Para Olvidar" Released: 24 April 2019

Norma is the sixth studio album by Chilean Mexican singer-songwriter Mon Laferte. It was released on 9 November 2018 through Universal Music México.

At the 20th Annual Latin Grammy Awards, Norma won in the category Best Alternative Music Album. It also won the Pulsar Award for Album of the Year.

== Background and recording ==
Norma is a concept album that explores the different stages of love, with each song telling part of a story of the relationship. The title for Norma comes from the artist's first name (Norma Monserrat Bustamante Laferte), which she disliked but used it to show that in her love life always follows the same "norma" (norm).

Norma was recorded in a single session at Studio A of Capitol Studios in Los Angeles, California, on 16 June 2018. The recording was made in a single shot, without using the overdubbing technique of layers of audio. Still, all the instruments were played simultaneously to give the material the sensation of live recording. 13 musicians participated in this recording. Omar Rodríguez-López was in charge of production, while the recording engineer was Bruce Botnick.

== Track listing ==
All tracks are written by Mon Laferte, except where noted.

Norma track listing
No.	Title	Writer(s)	Length
1.	"Ronroneo"		3:07
2.	"No Te Me Quites de Acá"	Laferte; El David Aguilar	3:04
3.	"Por Qué Me Fui a Enamorar de Ti"		4:20
4.	"Quédate Esta Noche"		3:50
5.	"Caderas Blancas"		3:45
6.	"El Mambo"	Laferte; Dámaso Pérez Prado; Aguilar	3:47
7.	"El Beso"	Laferte; Héctor Lavoe; Willie Colón	2:58
8.	"Cumbia Para Olvidar"		3:29
9.	"Funeral"		4:28
10.	"Si Alguna Vez" (with El David Aguilar)	Laferte; Aguilar	3:52
Total length:			36:40

== Personnel ==
Credits adapted from the liner notes of Norma.

Vocals

- Mon Laferte – lead vocals
- David Aguilar – background vocals, lead vocals (track 10)
- Sebastián Aracena – background vocals

Musicians

- David Aguilar – guitar
- Sebastián Aracena – guitar
- Francesco Marcocci – bass guitar
- Leo Genovese – organ, piano
- Daniel Rotem – flute, saxophone
- Enrique Sánchez – trumpet
- Cameron Johnson – trumpet
- Jonah Levine – trombone
- Henry Solomon – saxophone, flute
- Willy Rodríguez – percussion, drums
- Daniel Díaz – percussion
- Etienne Rivera Cabello – percussion

Production

- Omar Rodríguez-López – production, recording arrangements, programming
- Bruce Botnick – recording
- Jon Debaun – recording
- Rich Costey – mixing
- Howie Weinberg – mastering

Recording

- Recorded at Capitol Studios, Los Angeles, California

== Charts ==
=== Weekly charts ===
Weekly chart performance for Norma
Chart (2018)	Peak position
Argentine Albums (CAPIF)	12
Spanish Albums (PROMUSICAE)	67
Mexican Albums (AMPROFON)	2
US Latin Albums Sales (Billboard)	1
US Latin Pop Albums (Billboard)	9
US Top Latin Albums (Billboard)	24

=== Year-end charts ===
Year-end chart performance for Norma
Chart (2018)	Position
Mexican Albums (AMPROFON)	54

== Certifications ==
Certifications for Norma
Region	Certification	Certified units/sales
Chile (IFPI Chile)	2× Platinum	10 000*
Mexico (AMPROFON)	2× Platinum+Gold	150,000^{‡}
^{‡} Sales+streaming figures based on certification alone.
