= La Chica de Rojo =

2003 studio album by Mon Laferte

Studio album by Monserrat Bustamante
- Released: Late 2003
- Recorded: September 2003
- Studio: Estudios Sonus (Santiago de Chile)
- Genres: Latin pop; pop rock; Latin ballad
- Length: 34:21
- Language: Spanish
- Label: Warner Music Chile
- Producers: Gáspar Domínguez; Jaime Román; Gige Vidal; Walter Romero; Carolina Scipioni; Cristina Nunez; Cecilia Tassara

Monserrat Bustamante chronology
La Chica de Rojo (2003)	Desechable (2011)

Singles from La Chica de Rojo
- 1. "Corazón Bandido" Released: 2003; 2. "Yo Sin Tu Amor" Released: 2003; 3. "Maldita Ignorancia" Released: 2004; 4. "Cuerpo y Alma" Released: 2004

La Chica de Rojo is the debut studio album by Chilean Mexican singer-songwriter Mon Laferte, released on 12 July 2003 through Warner Music Chile. Some of the hits included in the album are: "Corazón Bandido", "Yo sin tu amor", "Dos locos" and "Maldita Ignorancia". The album was number one in Chile and was certified Platinum + Gold in Chile just a month after its release.

== Background ==
The album was released due to the TV series Rojo: Fama Contrafama, which was intended to satisfy her followers with these cover songs. La Chica de Rojo raised Bustamante popularity throughout Chile, reaching number one in albums sales in Chile and being certified Platinum + Gold in Chile just a month after its release.

== Track listing ==
La Chica de Rojo track listing
No.	Title	Writer(s)	Length
1.	"Corazón Bandido"	N. Marcelo	3:02
2.	"Yo Sin Tu Amor"	Felipe Bojalil Garza	3:42
3.	"Maldita Ignorancia"	Gaitán, Mulet, Ortega	2:44
4.	"Tú Me Completas"	Rudy Pérez	3:20
5.	"Dos Locos" (with Santos Chavez)	Alejandro Martínez R.	4:16
6.	"Si Tú Te Vas"	Luigui Giraldo, Quintanilla	2:51
7.	"Suéltalo"	Rafael Pérez Botija	4:08
8.	"Entre El Delirio y La Locura"	Gustavo Santander, Kike Santander	3:44
9.	"Dicen" (with Juan David Rodríguez)	Reily Barba, Luis Carlos Monroy	2:43
10.	"Cuerpo y Alma"	Pérez Botija García Rafael	3:52
Total length:			34:21

== Personnel ==
Credits adapted from La Chica de Rojo notes.

Vocals

- Monserrat Bustamante – lead vocals
- Santos Chavez – lead vocals (track 5)
- Juan David Rodríguez – lead vocals (track 9)
- Marcela Trujillo – background vocals
- Daniel Donoso – background vocals

Musicians

- Carlos Figueroa – drums
- C. Villagra – drums (track 8)
- Cristián Gálvez – bass guitar (track 1, 2, 3, 5, 6, 9)
- Leo Ahumada – bass guitar (track 4, 7, 8, 10)
- Gige Vidal – arrangement, piano, keyboards
- Claudio Prado – piano, keyboards (track 3)

Design

- Carolina Escobar Moragas – design

Production

- Gáspar Domínguez – executive production
- Jaime Román – production, mixing
- Gige Vidal – production
- Walter Romero – production, recording, mixing
- Carolina Scipioni – production, coordination
- Cristina Nunez – production, coordination
- Cecilia Tassara – production, coordination
- José Manuel Salinas M. – recording assistance
- Ximena Montenegro C. – recording assistance, mixing assistance
- Miguel Bahamonde – mastering

Recording

- Recorded at Estudios Sonus, Santiago de Chile

== Certifications ==
Certifications for La Chica de Rojo
Region	Certification
Chile	Platinum
