= Tornasol =

2013 studio album by Mon Laferte

Studio album by Mon Laferte
- Released: 7 January 2013
- Recorded: 2012
- Genre: Pop rock; reggae; Latin ballad; Hard rock
- Length: 51:00
- Language: Spanish
- Label: Independent
- Producer: César Ceja; Mon Laferte

Mon Laferte chronology
Desechable (2011)	Tornasol (2013)	Mon Laferte Vol.1 (2015)

Singles from Tornasol
- 1. "Ángel Negro" Released: 11 February 2013; 2. "Hey, Hey" Released: 10 April 2013; 3. "Tornasol Acústico" Released: 8 August 2013; 4. "Tornasol" Released: 19 August 2013; 5. "Lo Que Pido" Released: 4 March 2014; 6. "Orgasmo Para Dos" Released: 20 September 2014

Tornasol is the third studio album by Chilean Mexican singer-songwriter Mon Laferte. It released on 7 January 2013.

== Background ==
In January 2013, Mon Laferte launched her third album Tornasol. The album features fourteen tracks, which include collaborations from different artists like Renee Mooi and Chilean musicians like Paz Quintana (Tizana), Mariel Villagra (Mariel Mariel), Sebastián Soto (El Viaje de Seth) and Pamela Sepúlveda (Fakuta); the album explores a variety of genres, including rock, reggae, pop, electronic, ballad, among others, in which it leaves a clear and remarkable artistic growth and personal stamp. On this occasion, Mon Laferte debuts as a producer, work made in joint with Mexican musician Mr. Cesar Ceja and the track Conexión Espiritual under the direction of Ernesto Kong (ex Ráza). The first single was Ángel Negro.

In addition to being the first single, "Ángel Negro" opens to production that shows the maturity and the professionalism of the singer. The song has distinct passages, and collaborations with artists such as Mariel Mariel, Fakuta, and El Viaje de Seth.

The album can be listened to for free through Mon Laferte's official SoundCloud.

== Promotion ==
=== Singles ===
- "Ángel Negro": The first single was launched in 2013, through iTunes and on Mon Laferte's official website, and YouTube published the corresponding video. The clip is quite rhythmic but with some dark tones, Mon comes out dancing in different angles or with different effects in a park of some kind, or forest at night.
- Hey Hey": The second single was launched in April 2013, through iTunes and on Mon Laferte's official website, and YouTube published the corresponding video. In it we can see Mon showing a bit of what occurs off-stage and the environment that goes on at her concerts, a super typical style used in artists as popular as Paramore for example.
- "Tornasol": The third single was launched in August 2013, through iTunes and on Mon Laferte's official website, and YouTube published the corresponding video where Mon Laferte and Renee Mooi appear in a forest wearing colorful body paint reminiscent of the album cover.

== Track listing ==
All tracks are written by Mon Laferte, except where noted.

Tornasol track listing
No.	Title	Length
1.	"Ángel Negro"	3:15
2.	"Tornasol" (featuring Renee Mooi)	4:18
3.	"Lo Que Pido"	3:55
4.	"Orgasmo Para Dos"	4:03
5.	"Vuelve Por Favor"	4:16
6.	"Trátame Bien"	3:35
7.	"Flor De Amapola" (featuring Mariel Mariel)	4:12
8.	"Muerte En El Ring"	3:43
9.	"Hospital"	2:49
10.	"Hey Hey"	2:54
11.	"Nubes En Mis Pies"	3:34
12.	"Calma" (featuring El Viaje de Seth) (Laferte, El Viaje de Seth)	3:10
13.	"Estado Natural"	3:12
14.	"Igual Que Yo" (featuring Paz Quintana)	4:21
15.	"Tornasol" (Acústico)	4:22
Total length:		55:45
