= El Baile en TVN =

Television show in Chile

Based on the format of the program Strictly Come Dancing and part of the Dancing with the Stars franchise, El Baile en TVN ("The Ball on TVN") has aired in Chile since 16 October 2006. The hosts are Rafael Araneda and Karen Doggenweiler.

== Season 1 ==
Since October 16, 2006. The winners of this season were Juvenal Olmos and Claudia Miranda.

- Patricio Laguna (Model, partnered by Viví Rodríguez)
- Sigrid Alegría (Actress, partnered by Mario Méndez)
- Raquel Argandoña (TV personality, partnered by Alfredo Araya)
- Juanita Parra (Musician, partnered by Diego Heilig)
- Quique Neira (Musician, partnered by Verónica Lobos)
- Pilar Cox (TV host, partnered by Andrés Niérez)
- Horacio de la Peña (Former Tennis player, partnered by María Isabel Sobarzo)

== Season 2 ==
Since 5 March 2007. The winners of this season were Cristian Arriagada and Paz Bustos.

== Season 3 ==
Since 22 August 2007. The winners of this season were Francisco Reyes and Irene Bustamante.

- Carolina "Pampita" Ardohain (Argentine top model, partnered by Diego Heilig)
- Maria Eugenia Larrain "Kenita Larrain" (Chilean top model, partnered by Rodrigo Escobar)
- Amaya Forch (Chilean singer and actress, partnered by William Orrock)
- Catalina Palacios (entertainer in children's TV programs, partnered by Darwin Ruz)
- Adrea Tessa (Chilean singer, partnered by Alfredo Araya)
- Gianella Marengo (ex-reality show participant, partnered by Emilio Retamal)
- Leandro Martínez (Chilean singer and member of the TV program Rojo Fama Contrafama, partnered by Maria Isabel Sobarzo)
- Francisco Reyes (Chilean actor of the national television network TVN, partnered by Irene Bustamante)
- Juan Pablo Matulic (ex-reality show participant, partnered by Francini Amaral)
- Eliseo Salazar (Chilean former Formula One racing driver, partnered by Claudia Miranda)
- Hotuiti Teao (Chilean model from Easter Island, partnered by Monica Valenzuela)
- Carlos von Mühlenbrock (Chilean chef and entertainer of Chilean TV programs, partnered by Viví Rodriguez)

== Season 4 ==
The winners of this season were Fernando Godoy and Paz Bustos. The contestants of this season were :

- Sebastian Ferrer (Stylist & panelist of the TV show Pollo en conserva)
- Mario Guerrero (Singer)
- Sandra O Ryan (Actress)
- Reinaldo González (Military instructor of reality show Pelotón)
- Cristian Riquelme (Actor)
- Denisse Malebrán (Singer)
- Fernando Godoy (Actor, comediant & TV host)
- Mariana Derderian (Actress, singer & TV host)
- Sergio Vargas (Ex football player)
- Paola Camaggi (Model & TV host)
- Raquel "KEL" Calderón (Young actress, singer, model & panelist of TV shows)
- Iván Torres ("The Weather man")
- Rosita Parsons (Model)
