= Dios los cría =

Dios los cría may refer to:

- ...And God Created Them, a 1979 Puerto Rican comedy film
- God Created Them, a 1953 Mexican comedy film
