= Autopoiética =

Studio album by Mon Laferte
- Released: 10 November 2023
- Recorded: 2023
- Length: 45:59
- Language: Spanish
- Label: Universal
- Producers: Mon Laferte; Manu Jalil; Jorge Valdes; Paola Zozaya; Dano Martínez; Magicnelbeat; Nicolás Chávez Alzaga

Mon Laferte chronology
| 1940 Carmen (2021) | Autopoiética (2023) | Femme Fatale (2025) |

Singles from Autopoiética
- 1. "Tenochtitlán" Released: 25 August 2023; 2. "No+Sad" Released: 19 October 2023

Autopoiética is the ninth studio album by Chilean Mexican singer-songwriter Mon Laferte, released on 10 November 2023, through Universal Music México. It was her final release with Universal, following her departure in 2025 and signing with Sony Music Latin.

The album won Best Alternative Music Album at the 2024 Latin Grammy Awards. At the 2025 Grammy Awards, it was nominated for Best Latin Rock or Alternative Album, marking Laferte's third Grammy nomination.

== Background ==
Following the release of "Te juro que volveré" in August 2023, the first promotional single from the album, Laferte announced that she had an upcoming album set to be released later in the year. Laferte released "Tenochtitlán" as the first single for the album in August 2023, without an official announcement yet, but giving clues about the artistic direction of the record. Laferte said that "I loved this new creative work, I wanted to try new things from previous albums. I'm really excited, I feel that this is my best album yet".

Later in October, Laferte announced the name of the album as Autopoiética, a term that comes from "autopoiesis", coined by the Chilean biologist Humberto Maturana. Laferte explained the concept as "Our cells create themselves. In other words, life creates life. Everything in the end is cyclical. So, I loved that idea and I took it to a poetic sense: we are all autopoietic beings, I am autopoietic, I have the ability to recreate myself all the time, to create this universe, my personal mythology".

== Promotion ==
=== Singles ===
The song "Te juro que volveré" was released as a promotional single on 18 August 2023, alongside a visualizer. On August 25, 2023, "Tenochtitlán" was released as the first single from the album, alongside a music video directed by Camila Grandi. On 6 October 2023, "40 y MM" was released as a promotional single, alongside the album announcement. "No+Sad" was also released as single prior the album release on October 19, 2023, alongside a music video directed by Camila Grandi.

=== Tour ===
On December 4, 2023, Laferte announced her Autopoiética Tour. The tour started on February 29, 2024, in Puebla, Mexico, and included North America, and South America.

== Critical reception ==
Professional ratings
Review scores
| Source | Rating |
|---|---|
| AllMusic | 4/5 stars |
| Pitchfork | 7.5/10 |

Thom Jurek from AllMusic gave the album four out of five stars, writing that "Laferte's only recording to deliberately borrow ideas from her catalog. Titled after the term "autopoiesis," coined by the Chilean biologist Humberto Maturan, it's defined as "a being able to self-create or re-create itself". Laferte claimed it as a metaphor for herself and humanity: We have the ability to re-create ourselves at any time, creating new universes and personal mythologies in that process."

Pitchfork writer Isabelia Herrera defined the album as "The endlessly adaptable Chilean star flexes her versatility across synthy bossa nova, breezy trip hop, pummeling dance-punk, and dirty perreo."

== Track listing ==
All tracks are written by Mon Laferte, except where noted. All tracks are produced by Mon Laferte, Manu Jalil, Jorge Valdes, Paola Zozaya, except where noted.

Autopoiética track listing
| No. | Title | Writer(s) | Producer(s) | Length |
|---|---|---|---|---|
| 1. | "Tenochtitlán" | | Mon Laferte; Manu Jalil | 4:13 |
| 2. | "Te juro que volveré" | | Laferte; Jalil | 3:30 |
| 3. | "Préndele Fuego" | | | 4:00 |
| 4. | "No+Sad" | | Laferte; Jalil; Valdes; Zozaya; Dano Martínez; Magicnelbeat; Nicolás Chávez | 2:54 |
| 5. | "Metamorfosis" | Laferte; Esther Barria; Javiera Opazo; Manuel Alejandro Soto | | 3:10 |
| 6. | "Autopoiética" | Laferte; Soto | | 2:32 |
| 7. | "Block 16" | | | 0:42 |
| 8. | "Levítico 20:9" | | | 3:48 |
| 9. | "40 y MM" | | | 3:22 |
| 10. | "Pornocracia" | Laferte; Soto | | 4:23 |
| 11. | "Amantes Suicidas" | Laferte; Manu Jalil | | 3:58 |
| 12. | "Artículo 123" | | | 0:33 |
| 13. | "Mew Shiny" | | | 3:54 |
| 14. | "Casta Diva" | Laferte; Vincenzo Bellini | | 4:44 |
| Total length: | | | | 45:49 |
