= Rojo (TV series) =

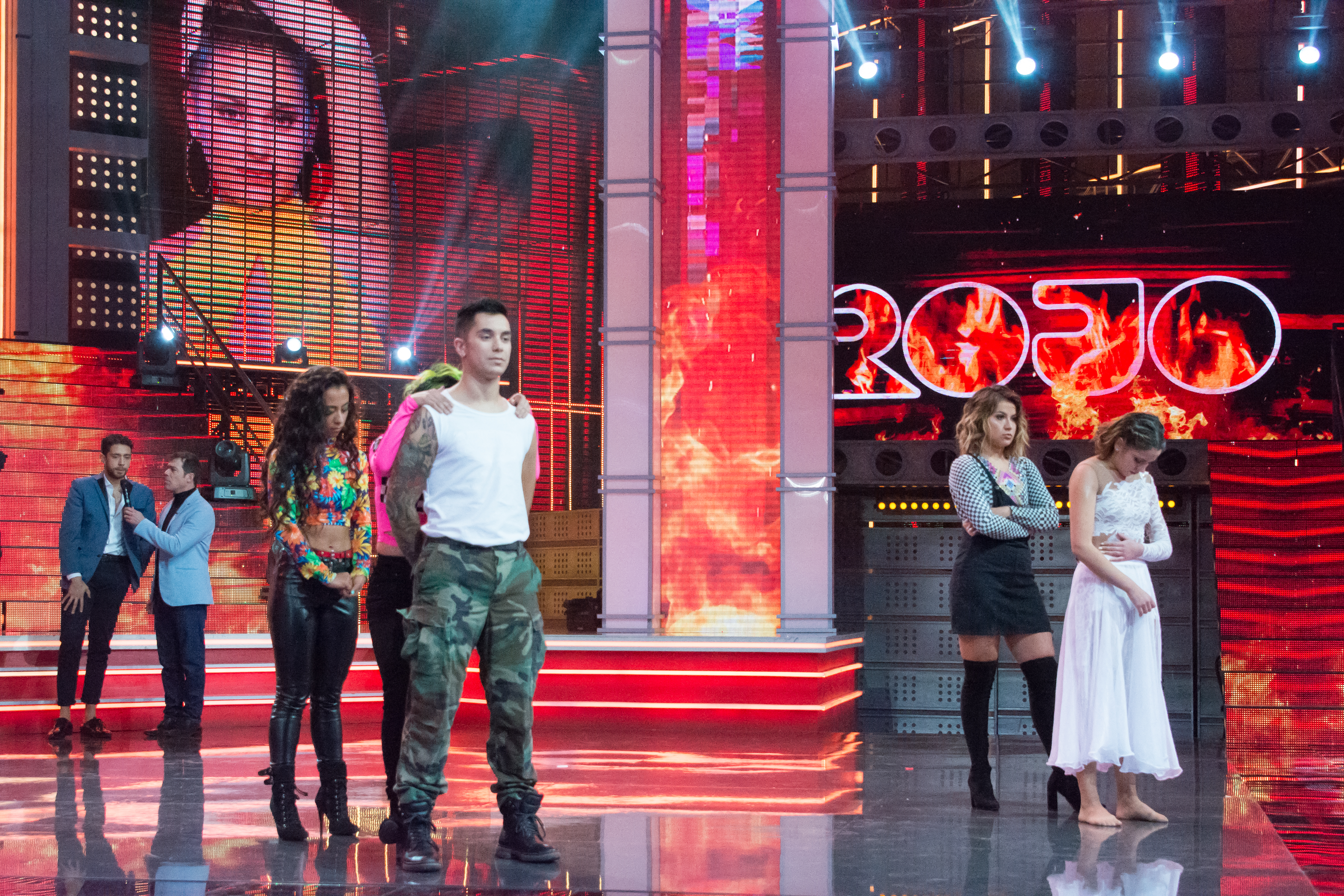
Elimination row, Rojo, Televisión Nacional de Chile, Santiago, Chile.

Rojo was a Chilean series of reality television competition series that started in 2002 and continued with various formats until 2008, allowing new talents in music and dance a chance for exposure with the public. Rafael Araneda was the host from 2002 to 2007. The last season in 2008 was hosted by Martín Cárcamo. The series was broadcast on Televisión Nacional de Chile known as TVN. The series was produced by Jorge Soissa and Roberto Apud and directed by Eduardo Domínguez (executive director) and Mariana Krumm (general director). In 2018 the show continued for 2 seasons until 2019, conducted by Álvaro Escobar.

A feature film based on Rojo was released called Rojo le pelicula with great box office success. An offshoot of Rojo (meaning red) was broadcast in Paraguay called ed Rojo Paraguay between 2004 and 2007 on "Channel 13 Paraguay".

== Series / Winners ==
Title	Year	Winner(s)
Primera Generación	2002–2003	Dancers: (Chile) Rodrigo Díaz; Singers: (Argentina) María Jimena Pereyra
Símbolo Rojo 1 and 2	2003	Símbolo Rojo 1: (Argentina) María Jimena Pereyra; Símbolo Rojo 2: (Chile) Maura Rivera
Segunda Generación	2003	Dancers: (Chile) María Isabel Sobarzo; Singers: (Chile) Mario Guerrero
Tercera Generación	2003	Dancers: (Chile) Christian Ocaranza; Singers: (Chile) Juan David Rodríguez
Gran Rojo Primera Temporada	2003–2004	Dancers: (Chile) Christian Ocaranza; Singers: (Chile) Carolina Soto
Rojo de Chile	2004	Dancers: (Chile) Pamela Lozano; Singers: (Chile) Bárbara Muñoz
Rojo, la Revancha	2004	Dancers: (Chile) Paulina López; Singers: (Chile) Juan David Rodríguez
Gran Rojo Segunda Temporada	2004 (Final)	Dancers: (Chile) Claudio Puebla; Singers: (Cuba) Sandier Ante
Rojo Internacional	2005	Dancers: (Mexico) Miryam Martínez; Singers: (Cuba) Orlando Oliva
Rojo Internacional II	2005	Dancers: (Chile) Paulina López; Singers: (Chile) Gabriel Suárez
Gran Final Internacional	2005	Dancers: (Chile) Leticia Zamorano; Singers: (Chile) Carolina Soto
Rojito	2005	Dancers: (Chile) Michael Pavez; Singers: (Chile) César Morales
Rojo VIP	2005	(Chile) Buddy Richard
Rojo, La Nueva Generación	2006	Dancers: (Chile) Mónica Ferrada; Singers: (Chile) Francisca Silva
Rojo, La Nueva Generación II	2006	Dancers: (Argentina) Diego Gómez; Singers: (Chile) Arturo Domínguez
Rojo, La Nueva Generación (Final)	2006	Dancers: (Chile) Iván Schmied (draw); Singers: (Chile) Rodrigo Tapia
Símbolo Rojo 3	2006	Dancers: (Chile) Paulina López; Singers: (Venezuela) Simoney Romero
Rojo, El más popular	2006	(Chile) Yamna Lobos
Rojito 2	2007	Singers: (Chile) Joane Carrasco; Dancers: (Chile) Karla Orellana
Rojo En Grupos	2007	Dancers: (Chile) Conny y Mauro; Singers: (Chile) Entreparentesis
Rojo II 2007	2007	Dancers: (Chile) Nicolás Cancino; Singers: (Chile) Paolo Ramírez
Final Rojo 2007	2007	Dancers: (Chile) Nía y Francisco; Singers: (Chile) Kbala
Rojo 2008	2008	Dancers: (Chile) Rodrigo Silva; Singers: (Argentina) (Chile) Carolina Mestrovic

== Discography ==
Rojo series releases

Album	Certification	Album	Certification
Rojo, Emociones y Canciones	5× Platinum	Singles de Rojo	Gold
Rojo 2, en Vivo	Platinum	Rojo N Roll	Platinum
Rojo, el Color del Amor	3× Platinum	Rojo, de Gala	2× Platinum
Rojo, el color del Amor 2	Gold	Rojo, de Culto	---
México, Rojo y Querido	Gold	Ragga Rojo	---
Blanco, Azul y Rojo	Gold	Cuatro Amantes	Gold
Fiesta al Rojo Vivo	Platinum	Rojo Rock Latino	---
Rojo, lo Mejor del Tour	Platinum	Rojo de Navidad	---
A Mover el Esqueleto	---	Clan Rojo en Verano	Platino
Rojo de Vacaciones	Gold	Rojo, la Película	---
El perreo de Yamna	---		

Solo artists

Artist	Title	Certification
María José Quintanilla	México, Lindo y Querido; Canta América; El Mago De Oz; Amores; Tu Corazón; Hoja en Blanco; 20 Grandes Éxitos de María José	9× Platinum; 2x Platino; ---; ---; ---; Gold; ---
María Jimena Pereyra	Dedicado; Esa Luz; Jimena y Más; Por Dejar que Pasar el Amor	3× Platinum; Platinum; ---; Gold
Mario Guerrero	Mario Guerrero; Te llevo En El Alma; Huellas de un Ayer; Te Amaré	2× Platinum; Gold; ---; ---
Daniela Castillo	Daniela Castillo; Obsesión; La Historia de Daniela Castillo, Todos sus Éxitos; Invencible	2x Platino; Gold; ---; ---
Leandro Martínez	Todo Lo Que Soy; El Deseo De Amar; Nostalgia; Mi Presente	Platinum; Gold; ---; ---
Mon Laferte	La Chica De Rojo; Desechable; Tornasol; Mon Laferte Vol.1; La Trenza; Norma	Gold; ---; ---; Platinum x 4 (Chile), Platinum x3 + Gold (Mexico); Platinum x 4 (Chile), Platinum x3 + Gold (Mexico), Platinum x 2 (Peru), Gold (Colombia), Gold (Ecuador); ---
Katherine Orellana	En Ella; Sigo Viva	Gold; ---
Christell	Christell; La Fiesta Continua; Ponte las Pilas; Canta y Baila Con Christell, Karaoke	8× Platinum; 2× Platinum; Gold; ---
Carolina Soto	Deseo; Debajo de la Piel	Gold; ---
Juan David Rodríguez	Cuatro Amantes (with others); Chocolate; Vida	Gold; Platinum; ---
Simoney Romero	Simoney	---
Luis Pedraza	Vamos Pa'elante	---
Bárbara Muñoz	Amanecer; Bárbara	---; ---
Gianina Ramos; Later as Gianina D'Angelo	Esencias; Ha Nacido Un Maestro (as Gianina D'Angelo)	---; ---
Miguel Garcés	Cuatro Amantes (with others)	Gold

== Offshoots ==
- Paraguayan "Channel 13" bought the concept from Chilean television and broadcast its own series called Rojo Paraguay for seasons 2004 to 2007.
- It was also later revived by Paraguayan "Canal 4 Telefuturo" in 2012 as Rojo Paraguay 2012
- Chilean television also negotiated franchise series in Mexico, Costa Rica, Ecuador and the United States
- Upon the success of Rojos in Chile, María José Quintanilla presented a children's series with the same format entitled Rojito. Two series were broadcast in 2005 and 2007
- Also Rafael Araneda hosted a series entitled Rojo VIP with contestants Miguel Piñera, Alejandro De Rosas, Juan Carlos Duque, Peter Rock, Pancho Puelma, Óscar Andrade, Catalina Telias, Cristóbal, Rodolfo Navech, Mónica De Calixto, Eduardo Valenzuela, Patricia Frías, Luis Dimas, Patricio Renán, Álvaro Scaramelli, Florcita Motuda, Irene Llano, Miguelo and Buddy Richard with Buddy Richard winning this special series.
- In 2006, owing to the success and popularity of the program and its contestants, the feature film Rojo, le pelicula (Rojo, the film) was released with huge box office success. Taking part, amongst others were María José Quintanilla, Mon Laferte, Daniela Castillo, Mario Guerrero, María Jimena Pereyra, and singers and dancers like Yamna Lobos, Rodrigo Díaz, Nelson Mauricio Pacheco and Christian Ocaranza and others.
- Rojo also became part of a pan-Latin American series in 2007 called Rojo Idol with a jury travelling to many countries to pick their best representatives. the final five from Chile were Ruben Álvarez, Licetty Alfaro, Francisca Silva, Daniela Ceballos and Rodrigo Tapia. The series was broadcast in 2007–2008.
- Clan rojo was a program that selected dancers and singers from various series of Rojo encompassing names from Primera Generación (first generation) with 10 contestants, Segunda Generación (second generation) and Tercera Generación (third generation) all from 2002 and 2003 seasons. The number was reduced to Final 8 who competed in official Clan Rojo. In later years, as new series of Rojo ran, with new winning names replacing some of the existing Clan members and this continuously until 2008 when the series was discontinued.
