= Tu Falta De Querer =

2015 song by Mon Laferte

Single by Mon Laferte

from the album Mon Laferte Vol.1
- Language: Spanish
- Released: 14 October 2015
- Recorded: 2014
- Genre: Latin ballad; pop rock; Latin alternative
- Length: 4:39
- Label: Universal
- Songwriters: Mon Laferte; Manuel Soto
- Producer: Mon Laferte

Mon Laferte singles chronology
"Amor Completo" (2015)	"Tu Falta De Querer" (2015)	"Si tú me quisieras" (2016)

Music video
- "Tu falta de querer" on YouTube

"Tu Falta De Querer" (Spanish for Your Lack of Love) is a song by Chilean Mexican singer-songwriter Mon Laferte, released as a single in 2015 through Universal Music Group. The track appears on her third studio album, Mon Laferte Vol.1, and was both written and produced by Laferte. A poignant Latin ballad blending pop rock and alternative influences, the song became a commercial breakthrough for the artist, achieving massive streaming success and establishing Laferte as a major voice in Latin American music.

== Background and composition ==
"Tu Falta De Querer" emerged from a period of profound personal crisis for Laferte. Following a difficult romantic breakup, she experienced severe depression and suicidal thoughts. The song was written during this time as a raw, emotional outlet. As she later explained in an interview, "I wrote about how I felt and the melody just spun in my head."

The song's journey to popularity began modestly. On 30 August 2014, Laferte uploaded a lo-fi, acoustic performance of the song to her YouTube channel, filmed by friends in her living room with a phone camera. When a friend asked for permission to post it online, Laferte reportedly responded, "go ahead, it's not like anyone will see it." Contrary to her expectations, the video gained traction and became the most popular content on her channel. This initial version has amassed over 513 million views.

The official studio version was included on Mon Laferte Vol. 1, released on 31 January 2015. When Universal Music relaunched the remastered album on 21 August 2015, a new version was featured, distinguished by replacing the original guitar solo with a piano arrangement.

== Commercial performance ==
The song became a major hit throughout Latin America, particularly in Mexico where it reached number 4 on radio charts and remained in the iTunes Top 100 for over six months.

In Laferte's native Chile, the song initially achieved moderate success, peaking at number 17 in 2015. It experienced a dramatic resurgence in 2017 following Laferte's high-profile role as a judge and performer at the Viña del Mar Song Festival. The song re-entered the charts, reaching the top 10 and peaking at number 9 during the week of 25 February 2017. After her acclaimed and controversial final-night performance at the festival, the song saw a substantial increase in digital sales, doubled its streaming numbers, and climbed to number 3 on the Chilean Singles Chart.

"Tu Falta De Querer" ranks among the most streamed songs by a Chilean artist on Spotify, holding the number two position behind "Una noche en Medellín" by Cris MJ.

== Music video ==
The official music video, released on 14 October 2015 through Laferte's VEVO channel, quickly became a viral sensation and one of the most-viewed videos by a Chilean artist. It received VEVO Certified status and had accumulated over 320 million views on YouTube by January 2020.

Directed with striking visual symbolism, the video juxtaposes wedding and funeral imagery. Laferte appears dressed as a bride accompanied by a funeral march through the Cerro de San Pedro in San Luis Potosí, Mexico. The narrative culminates with her effigy being burned as she sings the final chorus in tears, powerfully visualizing the song's themes of love and loss.

== Legacy and cover versions ==
"Tu Falta De Querer" has become a standard in contemporary Latin music, inspiring numerous cover versions across genres and countries:

- In Argentina, tropical and cuarteto group Banda XXI created a cumbia rendition performed as a duet with Peruvian singer Johana Rodríguez. Argentine singer Karina "La Princesita" also performed the song on the talent show Showmatch: La Academia.
- Peruvian cumbia and salsa groups Orquesta Candela and Son Tentación have incorporated the song into their repertoires.
- In the United States, Mexican singer Kika Edgar performed the song on the second season of Univision's imitation show Tu cara me suena.
- Mexican singer Carolina Ross's YouTube cover has gained significant attention online.
- During the Radical Optimism Tour, on her first night in Santiago, Chile, on November 11, 2025, Dua Lipa performed her version of the song.

== Awards and nominations ==
Year	Award	Category	Result
2016	MTV Millennial Awards	Latin Video of the Year	Won

== Credits and personnel ==
Credits adapted from Mon Laferte Vol.1 liner notes.

Vocals

- Mon Laferte – lead vocals

Musicians

- Manuel Soto – piano, synthesizer
- Daniel Martínez – drums
- David Rodríguez – saxophone
- Santiago Lara – guitar
- Jimmy Frazier – bass
- Patricio García Portius – electric guitar
- Néstor Varela – trombone
- Joe D'Ettiene – trumpet

Production

- Mon Laferte – production
- Benjamín Castro – mixing

== Charts ==
=== Weekly charts ===
Weekly chart performance for "Tu Falta De Querer"
Chart (2016–2017)	Peak position
Chile (Monitor Latino)	15
Chile Pop (Monitor Latino)	8
Mexico (Monitor Latino)	20
Mexico Pop (Monitor Latino)	5
Argentina Hot 100 (Billboard)	93

=== Year-end charts ===
2017 year-end chart performance for "Tu Falta De Querer"
Chart (2017)	Position
Chile (Monitor Latino)	33
Chile Pop (Monitor Latino)	12
Nicaragua Pop (Monitor Latino)	36

2018 year-end chart performance for "Tu Falta De Querer"
Chart (2018)	Position
Chile (Monitor Latino)	63
Chile Pop (Monitor Latino)	26

== Certifications ==
Certifications for "Tu Falta De Querer"
Region	Certification	Certified units/sales
Mexico (AMPROFON)	3× Diamond+Gold	930,000^{‡}
Spain (Promusicae)	Gold	30,000
^{‡} Sales+streaming figures based on certification alone.
