= Mon Laferte =

Chilean–Mexican singer-songwriter (born 1983)

- Laferte at the 2026 Latin Grammy Awards
- Born: Norma Montserrat Bustamante Laferte; 2 May 1983 (age 43); Viña del Mar, Chile
- Citizenship: Chile; Mexico
- Occupation: Singer-songwriter
- Years active: 2003–present
- Musical career
- Genres: Música cebolla; Latin alternative; Latin jazz; Latin soul; indie pop; bolero; alternative rock
- Instruments: Vocals; guitar
- Labels: Warner Chile; Universal Mexico; Sony Latin

Norma Montserrat Bustamante Laferte (born 2 May 1983), known professionally as Mon Laferte, is a Chilean and Mexican singer-songwriter. Recognized for her versatility, her musical style spans a wide array of genres, including pop, alternative, bolero, cumbia, and salsa. She rose to international prominence in the 2010s, particularly for her melodramatic vocals and theatrical stage presence. In 2025, Billboard named her one of the greatest female Latin pop artists of all time.

With over 4.8 million album-equivalent units sold in Mexico, Laferte is the best-selling Chilean artist of the digital era. Her most successful releases, including the albums Mon Laferte, Vol. 1 (2015) and La Trenza (2017), and the singles "Tu Falta De Querer", "Amárrame", and "Mi Buen Amor," were certified diamond or higher by AMPROFON. Her accolades include five Latin Grammy Awards—the most for any Chilean performer—a Musa Award, two MTV Europe Music Awards, and three Grammy Award nominations.

== Early life and education ==
Laferte grew up with her mother Myriam Laferte Herrera, her maternal grandmother Norma, and her younger sister Solange, in their hometown of Viña del Mar, a port town in Chile near the capital of Santiago. In 1992, at the age of nine, she won first prize in a contest organized by Orlando Peña Carvajal school. She was given a guitar, with which she first began to compose her own songs. At the age of thirteen she got a scholarship to study music for a year and a half at the conservatory in her hometown, although she preferred the self-taught path to the academic one. She honed her skills by playing in bars in Viña del Mar and Valparaiso.

In August 2007, Laferte emigrated to Mexico. In 2008, she began performing in Veracruz and Mexico City as Mon Laferte. On 30 November 2022, after living and working in Mexico for more than 15 years, Laferte was granted Mexican citizenship.

== Career ==
=== 2003–2009: La Chica de Rojo and move to Mexico ===
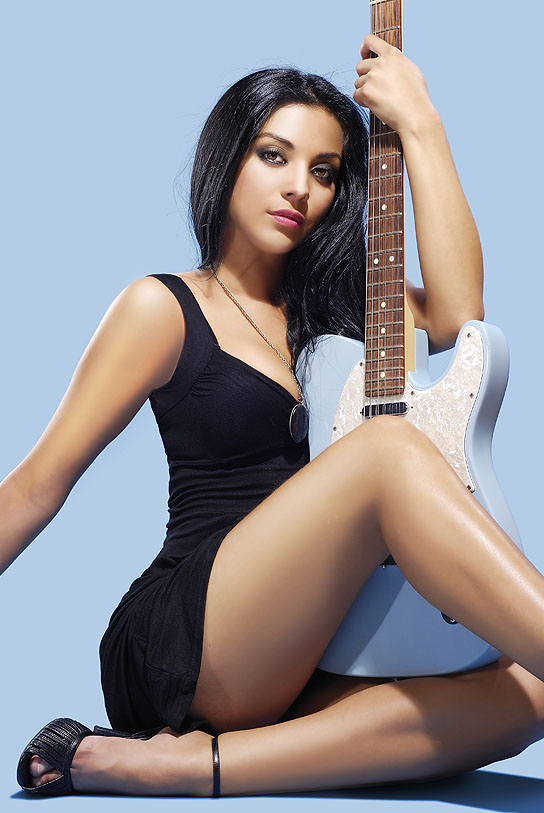
Laferte in 2008

In 2003, Laferte, then known as Monserrat Bustamante, entered the Chilean reality competition series Rojo. That same year, she released her first studio album, La Chica de Rojo. The album had great success in Chile, receiving Gold and Platinum certifications. She became part of the Clan Rojo and was on the television series for four seasons.

Laferte decided to start a new chapter in her musical career by moving from Chile to Mexico City in 2007, where she began singing in nightclubs and recording cover songs. In 2009, she released a single titled "Lo mismo que yo", which was to be the lead single for an upcoming album. The same year, Laferte was diagnosed with thyroid cancer, effectively putting a halt to her album. Around the time of her battle with cancer, she abandoned her original stage name and took on the name Mon Laferte, expressing that the name represented a new beginning for her:

"Mi cambio de nombre no es por querer ser otra persona, es que las circunstancias de la vida me han llevado a cambiar mucho y sentí que tenía que empezar de cero."

=== 2010–2012: Desechable and television projects ===
Laferte decided to scrap the album she was recording in 2009, and returned two years later with her second studio album, titled Desechable. The next year, in 2012, she was invited to judge the second season of the Chilean version of The X Factor, called Factor X, along with Karen Doggenweiler, Tito Beltrán and José Luis Rodríguez. It was also around this time, in early 2012, that she appeared as a vocalist for the Mexican all-female heavy metal band Mystica Girls, with whom in February 2014 she recorded the album titled Gates of Hell.

=== 2013–2017: Tornasol, eponymous album and La Trenza ===
In 2013, she released her third album, Tornasol. She received media attention in 2015 with her single "Tu Falta De Querer" from the album Mon Laferte, Vol.1. In 2016, she won a MTV Millennial Award for the "Latin Video of the Year" and receiving two nominations on the Latin Grammy Awards of 2016 for Best New Artist and Best Alternative Music Album.

Laferte released her fifth album La Trenza, her most acclaimed album to date, in 2017. Her single with Colombian rock star Juanes, "Amárrame", won the Best Alternative Song award at the 18th Latin GRAMMYs, in which she was also nominated for Best Alternative Music Album, Song of the Year, Album of the Year, and Record of the Year. She also wins the category "Best North Latin Artist" in the 2017 MTV Europe Music Awards.

=== 2018–2021: Norma, Seis and 1940 Carmen ===
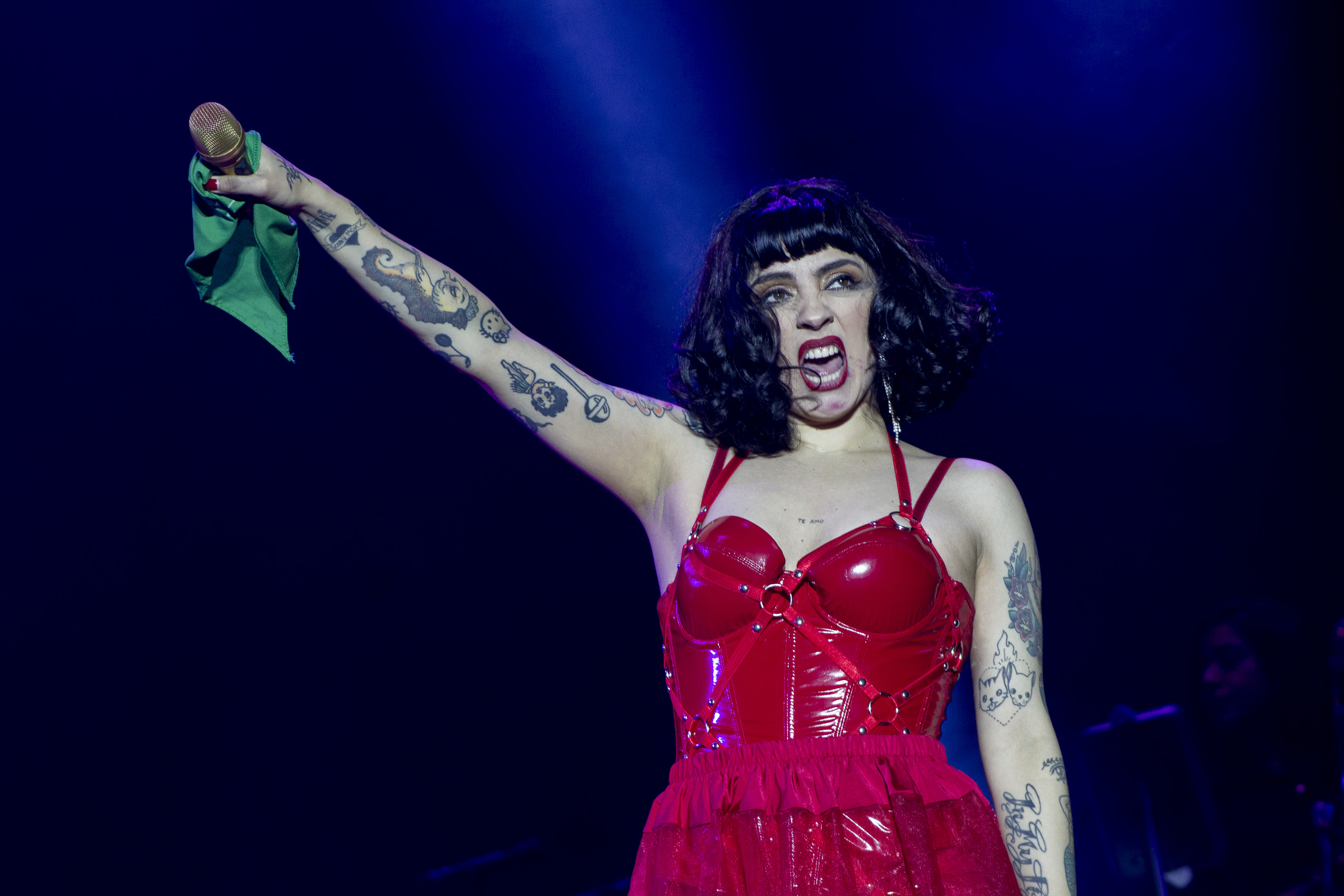
Laferte performing in 2020

In February 2018 she released the single "Antes de Ti" that was nominated to the 19th Annual Latin Grammy Awards as "Song of the Year". The video for the single was also Mon Laferte's directorial debut. In June 2018, she co-hosted the 2018 MTV Millennial Awards in Mexico City at the Mexico City Arena along with the Venezuelan YouTube personality La Divaza. During the year 2018, Mon worked on her sixth studio album, Norma , which was recorded in a single session in studio A of Capitol Studios of Los Angeles, the recording was made in one shot, without using the overdubbing technique of audio layers, but all the instruments playing simultaneously to give the material the feeling of live recording. In this recording 13 musicians participated. Omar Rodríguez-López was in charge of the album's production and the recording engineer was Bruce Botnick. The album was released on 9 November 2018.

On 26 October 2018, she collaborated with American singer Gwen Stefani on her new Christmas album on a cover of the song "Feliz Navidad" by the Puerto Rican singer-songwriter José Feliciano. At the end of 2018, the international television network HTV nominated Mon Laferte in the "Best Southern Artist" category of the Heat Latin Music Awards 2019.

In January 2019, she was announced to participate in the American Music Festival Coachella. In February 2019, Mon Laferte received her first nomination at the Billboard Latin Music Awards in the Top Latin Albums Artist of the Year category, Female. Also the Album Norma received a Gold record in Mexico for 30,000 copies sold. In May 2019, the singer announced her U.S. tour, under the headline "La Gira de Norma". The tour started on 10 August 2019, in Seattle's Neptune Theatre, following a European tour that same Summer. On 14 November 2019, Mon Laferte made headlines with her act of political protest, exposing her breasts at the Latin Grammys to display the message "En Chile Torturan Violan y Matan" (English translation: In Chile they torture, rape and kill) on her bare chest.

On 19 November 2019, Laferte was interviewed by Patricia Janiot from Univision. In that interview, Mon Laferte justified the looting and burning of numerous supermarkets and other buildings by saying that "they were only material goods". When asked if she condemned violence, she said, "I do not approve of any kind of violence. Now, if you ask me personally, if I have to go burn down a supermarket that has robbed from me my entire life to demand the basic rights I feel I deserve, I will do it!" She accused the police and armed forces of burning the dozens of subway stations that were burnt by rioters on 18 October 2019.

Laferte was subpoenaed on 30 November 2019, by Chilean prosecutors to provide a statement regarding any evidence she may have had to support her accusation that Chilean police and armed forces actively participated in the burning of subway stations. Chilean police stated that, depending on her testimony, they might pursue criminal charges against her. The charges were later dropped.

In 2021, Laferte contributed a cover of the Metallica song "Nothing Else Matters" to the charity tribute album The Metallica Blacklist. In June 2022, she announced her Mexican citizenship during a press conference stating "Llevo 15 años en México, tengo un hijo mexicano, mi pareja es mexicana. Pero esto es hermoso, es la cereza del pastel!" The now Chilean Mexican singer stated that she was happy to have her new nationality since she has called Mexico her home for the past 15 years. During which time she built up and created her career as the persona we now know as Mon Laferte.

=== 2023–present: Autopoiética and Femme Fatale ===
She sang a Spanglish cover of the song "Survivor" for the 2023 animated film Migration.

=== Visual arts ===
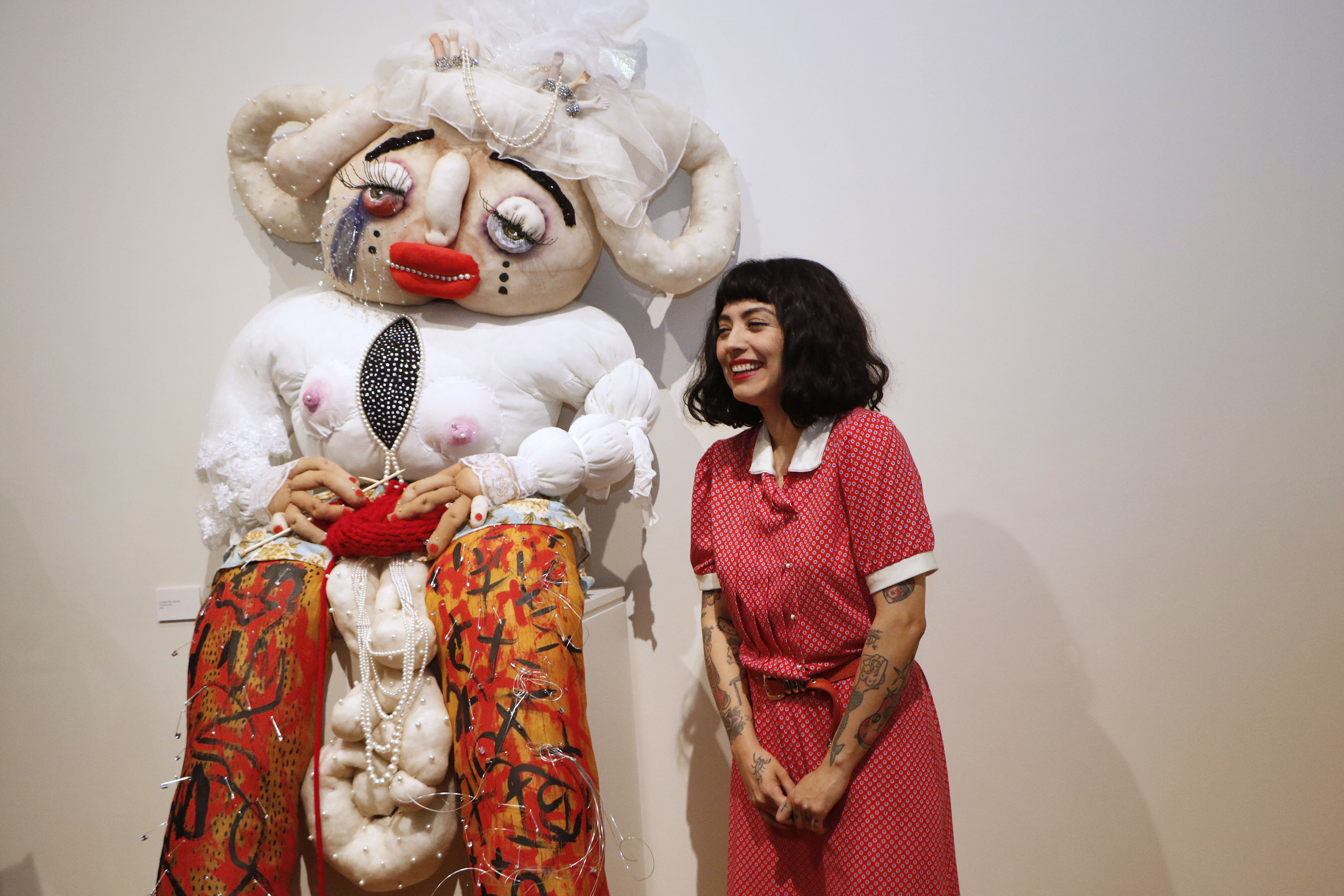
Laferte at her Gestos visual art exhibit, 2020

On 11 March 2020, she debuted as a visual artist in the solo exhibit entitled Gestos at the Museum of the City of Mexico, containing 76 art pieces. Laferte commented she had painted for ten years as a self-taught artist with some lessons from her father, a painter himself.

In January 2023, she performed for the first time at the Olmué Huaso Festival, returning to the Patagual stage, where she had performed when she was little. On the occasion she was accompanied by the traditional Oaxacan female group Mujeres del Viento Florido in the entirety of her show, playing her greatest hits. At the concert she invited the singer Chabelita Fuentes, with whom she sang "La Enagüita", a classical Chilean tune. She also took the opportunity to sing "Canción sin miedo" by the Mexican singer Vivir Quintana, provoking the admiration of the public.

== Personal life ==
She resided briefly in Los Angeles, CA in 2021. Her husband is Joel Orta, a musician who is a guitarist for the Mexican rock band, Celofán. She and Orta married in October 2022, eight months after the birth of their son. Due to the radiation treatment she received in 2009 for thyroid cancer, she underwent fertility treatments in California to conceive her son. Although there are some English-language songs on her album, 1940 Carmen, she does not speak English fluently and instead used Google Translate to write them. She is a vegan, feminist and an LGBTQ+ rights activist.

== Discography ==
Studio albums

- La Chica de Rojo (2003)
- Desechable (2011)
- Tornasol (2013)
- Mon Laferte, Vol. 1 (2015)
- La Trenza (2017)
- Norma (2018)
- Seis (2021)
- 1940 Carmen (2021)
- Autopoiética (2023)
- Femme Fatale (2025)
- Femme Fatale Vol. 2 (2026)

== Awards and nominations ==
Award	Year	Category	Nominated work	Result	Ref.
Billboard Latin Music Awards	2019	Top Latin Albums Artist of the Year, Female	Mon Laferte	Nominated	
Copihue de Oro	2007	Female Artist	Mon Laferte	Won	
Copihue de Oro	2017	Popular/Tropical Group or Singer	Mon Laferte	Won	
Copihue de Oro	2017	Revelation	Mon Laferte	Nominated	
Copihue de Oro	2021	Artist of the Decade	Mon Laferte	Won	
Grammy Awards	2022	Best Regional Mexican Music Album (including Tejano)	Seis	Nominated	
Grammy Awards	2023	Best Latin Rock or Alternative Album	1940 Carmen	Nominated	
Grammy Awards	2025	Best Latin Rock or Alternative Album	Autopoiética	Nominated	
Heat Latin Music Awards	2019	Best Artist Southern Region	Mon Laferte	Nominated	
Heat Latin Music Awards	2020	Best Artist Southern Region	Mon Laferte	Nominated	
Heat Latin Music Awards	2020	Best Rock Artist	Mon Laferte	Nominated	
Heat Latin Music Awards	2021	Best Rock Artist	Mon Laferte	Nominated	
Latin Grammy Awards	2016	Best New Artist	Mon Laferte	Nominated	
Latin Grammy Awards	2016	Best Alternative Music Album	Mon Laferte Vol.1	Nominated	
Latin Grammy Awards	2017	Album of the Year	La Trenza	Nominated	
Latin Grammy Awards	2017	Best Alternative Music Album	La Trenza	Nominated	
Latin Grammy Awards	2017	Record of the Year	"Amárrame" (with Juanes)	Nominated	
Latin Grammy Awards	2017	Song of the Year	"Amárrame" (with Juanes)	Nominated	
Latin Grammy Awards	2017	Best Alternative Song	"Amárrame" (with Juanes)	Won	
Latin Grammy Awards	2018	Song of the Year	"Antes de Ti"	Nominated	
Latin Grammy Awards	2019	Best Alternative Music Album	Norma	Won	
Latin Grammy Awards	2020	Best Alternative Song	"Chilango Blues"	Nominated	
Latin Grammy Awards	2020	Best Rock Song	"Biutiful"	Won	
Latin Grammy Awards	2021	Song of the Year	"Que Se Sepa Nuestro Amor" (with Alejandro Fernández)	Nominated	
Latin Grammy Awards	2021	Best Regional Song	"Que Se Sepa Nuestro Amor" (with Alejandro Fernández)	Nominated	
Latin Grammy Awards	2021	Best Pop Song	"La Mujer"	Nominated	
Latin Grammy Awards	2021	Best Singer-Songwriter Album	Seis	Won	
Latin Grammy Awards	2022	Song of the Year	"Algo es Mejor"	Nominated	
Latin Grammy Awards	2023	Best Alternative Song	"Traguito" (with iLe)	Nominated	
Latin Grammy Awards	2024	Album of the Year	Autopoiética	Nominated	
Latin Grammy Awards	2024	Best Alternative Music Album	Autopoiética	Won	
Latin Grammy Awards	2024	Record of the Year	"Tenochtitlán"	Nominated	
Latin Grammy Awards	2025	Song of the Year	"Otra Noche de Llorar"	Nominated	
Latin Grammy Awards	2025	Best Long Form Music Video	Mon Laferte, Te Amo	Nominated	
Latin Grammy Awards	2026	Album of the Year	Femme Fatale	Pending	
Latin Grammy Awards	2026	Best Singer-Songwriter Album	Femme Fatale	Nominated	
Latin Grammy Awards	2026	Record of the Year	"Femme Fatale"	Pending	
Latin Grammy Awards	2026	Song of the Year	"Femme Fatale"	Pending	
Latin Grammy Awards	2026	Best Pop Song	"Melancolía"	Nominated	
Latin Grammy Awards	2026	Best Alternative Song	"1:30"	Nominated	
Latin Recording Academy	2023	Leading Ladies of Entertainment	Mon Laferte	Won	
Luces Awards	2019	Concert of the Year	Mon Laferte	Nominated	
MTV Europe Music Awards	2016	Best Latin America North Act	Mon Laferte	Nominated	
MTV Europe Music Awards	2017	Best Latin America North Act	Mon Laferte	Won	
MTV Europe Music Awards	2018	Best Latin America North Act	Mon Laferte	Nominated	
MTV Europe Music Awards	2019	Best Latin America North Act	Mon Laferte	Won	
Musa Awards	2020	Artist of the Year	Mon Laferte	Won	
Musa Awards	2020	Song of the Year	"Plata Ta Tá"	Nominated	
Musa Awards	2020	Collaboration of the Year	"La Danza de las Libélulas" (with Manuel García)	Nominated	
Musa Awards	2020	Collaboration of the Year	"Que Se Sepa Nuestro Amor" (with Alejandro Fernández)	Nominated	
Musa Awards	2021	Album of the Year	Seis	Nominated	
Musa Awards	2021	Collaboration of the Year	"La Mujer" (with Gloria Trevi)	Nominated	
Musa Awards	2023	Video of the Year	"Tenochtitlán"	Nominated	
Natida Awards	2019	Chileno de las Artes	Mon Laferte	Won	
Premios Gardel	2019	Collaboration of the Year	"Amor (En Vivo)" (with Los Auténticos Decadentes)	Nominated	
Premios Juventud	2021	Best Regional Mexican Fusion	"Que Se Sepa Nuestro Amor" (with Alejandro Fernández)	Nominated	
Premios Juventud	2021	Girl Power	"La Mujer" (with Gloria Trevi)	Nominated	
Premios Juventud	2021	Girl Power	"Se Portaba Mal" (with Kany García)	Nominated	
Premios Lo Nuestro	2022	Pop Artist of the Year	Mon Laferte	Nominated	
Premios Pulsar	2018	Artist of the Year	La Trenza	Nominated	
Premios Pulsar	2018	Album of the Year	La Trenza	Nominated	
Premios Pulsar	2018	Best Pop Artist	La Trenza	Won	
Premios Pulsar	2018	Song of the Year	"Amárrame"	Won	
Premios Pulsar	2018	Most Listened Song on Chilean Radios	"Amárrame"	Won	
Premios Pulsar	2019	Artist of the Year	Norma	Nominated	
Premios Pulsar	2019	Album of the Year	Norma	Won	
Premios Pulsar	2019	Best Pop Artist	Norma	Nominated	
Premios Pulsar	2019	Song of the Year	"El Beso"	Won	
Premios Pulsar	2019	Most Listened Song on Chilean Radios	"Amárrame"	Won	
Premios Pulsar	2020	Most Listened Song on Chilean Radios	"El Beso"	Won	
Premios Pulsar	2022	Album of the Year	Seis	Nominated	
Premios Pulsar	2022	Best Singer-Songwriter	Seis	Nominated	
Premios Pulsar	2022	Best Pop Artist	1940 Carmen	Nominated	
Premios Pulsar	2022	Artist of the Year	Mon Laferte	Nominated	
Premios Pulsar	2022	Most Listened Song on Chilean Radios	"Tu Falta De Querer"	Won	
Premios Pulsar	2024	Album of the Year	Autopoiética	Won	
Premios Pulsar	2024	Best Singer-Songwriter	Autopoiética	Nominated	
Premios Pulsar	2024	Song of the Year	"Tenochtitlán"	Nominated	
Premios Pulsar	2024	Artist of the Year	Mon Laferte	Nominated	
SHOCK Awards	2016	Best New Artist or Group	Mon Laferte	Won	
Spotify Awards	2020	Most Listened Pop Artist	Mon Laferte	Nominated	
Telehit Awards	2016	Best Rock Artist	Mon Laferte	Won	
Telehit Awards	2017	Best Pop/Rock Artist	Mon Laferte	Won	
Telehit Awards	2017	Best Act	Mon Laferte	Won	
MTV MIAW Awards	2016	Buzz Artist	Mon Laferte	Won	
MTV MIAW Awards	2016	Collaboration of the Year	"Palmar" (with Caloncho)	Nominated	
MTV MIAW Awards	2016	Video of the Year	"Tu Falta De Querer"	Won	
MTV MIAW Awards	2017	Mexican Artist	Mon Laferte	Won	
MTV MIAW Awards	2017	#Instacrush	Mon Laferte	Nominated	
MTV MIAW Awards	2017	Collaboration of the Year	"Amárrame" (with Juanes)	Nominated	
MTV MIAW Awards	2017	Video of the Year	"Amárrame" (with Juanes)	Nominated	
MTV MIAW Awards	2018	Video of the Year	"Antes de Ti"	Nominated	
MTV MIAW Awards	2018	Mexican Artist	Mon Laferte	Nominated	
MTV MIAW Awards	2019	UP WOMEN!	Mon Laferte	Nominated	
MTV MIAW Awards	2019	Mexican Artist	Mon Laferte	Nominated	
MTV MIAW Awards	2019	Video of the Year	"El Beso"	Won	
MTV MIAW Awards	2019	Music Ship	"Amor" (with Los Auténticos Decadentes)	Nominated	
MTV MIAW Awards	2021	Mexican Artist	Mon Laferte	Nominated	

== Filmography ==
Films
Year	Film	Role	Notes
2006	Rojo, La Pelicula	Belén	Chilean film
2013	Japy Ending	Eli	Peruvian film
2024	Mon Laferte, te amo	Self	Documentary

Television
Year	TV series	Role
2003–2007	Rojo Fama Contrafama	Contestant
2006–2007	El Baile en TVN	Singer
2012	Factor X	Judge and mentor
