= Mon Laferte, Vol. 1 =

Mon Laferte Vol.1

Studio album by Mon Laferte
- Released: 31 January 2015
- Recorded: 2014–2015
- Genre: Latin alternative; Latin ballad; pop rock
- Length: 41:59
- Language: Spanish
- Label: Universal Music México
- Producer: Mon Laferte

Mon Laferte chronology
Tornasol (2013)	Mon Laferte Vol.1 (2015)	La Trenza (2017)

Singles from Mon Laferte Vol.1
- 1. "Tormento" Released: 3 January 2015; 2. "Amor completo" Released: 31 July 2015; 3. "Tu falta de querer" Released: 14 October 2015; 4. "Si tú me quisieras" Released: 8 May 2016

Mon Laferte Vol.1 is the fourth studio album by Chilean Mexican singer-songwriter Mon Laferte, released on 21 August 2015.

== Promotion ==
=== Singles ===
The first single from the album was "Tormento", whose official video, launched on Vevo, was inspired by Serbian artist Marina Abramović. The second single was the ballad "Amor completo", which Laferte wrote at a time when she was in love. The video was recorded in Mexico City and is made up of scenes showing a romantic day out with the actor playing Mon's love interest. The third single, and her biggest hit up to that time, was "Tu falta de querer". Laferte wrote this song at a difficult time when she had just broken up with her boyfriend, which plunged her into a deep depression. The fourth single is a song with a Mexican flavour, "Si tu me quisieras". This song was included in the re-release of the Vol. 1 album when it was picked up by the label Universal Music Mexico.

== Track listing ==
All tracks are written by Mon Laferte, except where noted.

Mon Laferte, Vol. 1 track listing
No.	Title	Length
1.	"Tormento" (Laferte, Cesar Ceja)	4:36
2.	"El Cristal"	3:00
3.	"El Diablo" (Laferte, Jose Manuel Soto)	4:02
4.	"La Visita"	3:46
5.	"Amor Completo"	4:01
6.	"Un Alma En Pena"	2:22
7.	"Tu Falta de Querer" (Laferte, Soto)	4:38
8.	"Salvador"	3:20
9.	"Si Tu Me Quisieras"	3:22
10.	"Malagradecido"	3:07
11.	"La Noche Del Dia Que Llovio en Verano" (Laferte, Carolina Dagach)	0:56
12.	"Bonita" (bonus track)	3:40
Total length:		41:59

== Personnel ==
Credits adapted from Mon Laferte Vol.1 liner notes.

Vocals

- Mon Laferte – lead vocals

Musicians

- Manuel Soto – piano, synthesizer
- Daniel Martinez – drums
- David Rodríguez – saxophone
- Santiago Lara – guitar
- Jimmy Frazier – bass
- Patricio Garcia Portius – electric guitar
- Néstor Varela – trombone
- Joe D'Ettiene – trumpet

Production

- Mon Laferte – production
- Benjamín Castro – mixing

== Charts ==
Year-end chart performance for Mon Laferte, Vol. 1
Chart	Year	Position
Mexican Albums (AMPROFON)	2015	5
Mexican Albums (AMPROFON)	2016	4
Mexican Albums (AMPROFON)	2017	27

== Certifications ==
=== Album ===
Certifications for Mon Laferte, Vol. 1
Region	Certification	Certified units/sales
Chile (IFPI)	4× Platinum	40,000
Mexico (AMPROFON)	Diamond+Gold	330,000^{‡}
^{‡} Sales+streaming figures based on certification alone.

=== Singles ===
Certifications for singles from Mon Laferte, Vol. 1
Country	Title	Certificacation	Certified units/Sales	Ref.
Mexico (AMPROFON)	"Tu falta de querer"	Diamond	300,000	
Mexico (AMPROFON)	"Amor completo"	Platinum	60,000	
Mexico (AMPROFON)	"Si tú me quisieras"	Platinum	60,000	
Mexico (AMPROFON)	"Tormento"	Gold	30,000	
