= Universal Music México =

Mexican subsidiary of Universal Music Group

Universal Music Group México
- Logo in use since January 2020
- Formerly: Dusa Discos Universales S.A. (1963–1971); Polydor S.A. de C.V. (1971–1977); PolyGram Discos S.A. de C.V. (1977–1999); Universal Music México S.A. de C.V. (1999–2021)
- Company type: Subsidiary
- Industry: Music; Entertainment
- Founded: 1963; 63 years ago
- Headquarters: Cuauhtémoc, Mexico City, Mexico
- Key people: Alfredo Delgadillo (CEO)
- Products: Music and entertainment
- Revenue: See Universal Music Group
- Parent: Universal Music Group
- Subsidiaries: Raw Talent; Universal Music Publishing México; Fonovisa Records
- Website: udiscover.mx

Universal Music Group México S.A. de C.V. (often referred to as just UMG México) is a Mexican subsidiary of the Universal Music Group founded in 1963. It was founded as Dusa Discos Universales in 1963, undergoing several name changes over the years, first being first acquired by Gramophon-Philips Group (PolyGram) in 1971. It has been known as Universal Music México since 1999, following PolyGram's merger with UMG through the acquisition of Seagram.

== History ==
Philips logo, used throughout the Philips–PolyGram era.

=== Dusa, Philips and PolyGram (1963–1999) ===
The company was founded in 1963, under the name Dusa Discos Universales, during the 1960s it signed and launched talents such as Los Bonys, Gabriel Gaytán y Los Leos, Los Portorriqueños, Alvaro Zermeño, Rocío Durcal, among others. Dusa also distributed artists on record labels of the then Philips Phonographische Industries (such as Polydor and Mercury Records). They also released the famous compilation albums "Jugo de Hits".

Dusa was eventually purchased by Grammophon-Philips Group in 1971, briefly called Polydor (Mexico) from 1971 to 1977. Due to the name change from Grammophon-Philips to PolyGram, the Mexican subsidiary was renamed PolyGram Discos in 1977. During the Philips-PolyGram years, the company continued doing the same as Dusa, launching national artists and distributing global PolyGram artists in Mexico.

In 1982, A&M Records' Mexican sublabel, titled AyM Discos, was also briefly established in Mexico City before being acquired by PolyGram in 1989.

=== Universal Music México (1999–present) ===
Due to Seagram's acquisition of PolyGram in 1998, PolyGram was merged with Universal Music Group (previously Decca and MCA), and its Mexican office was renamed as Universal Music México.

Another important imprint and catalog of UMG México is Fonovisa Records, which was founded in Mexico in 1984 by Televisa; It had artists such as Los Tigres del Norte, Los Humildes, Los Bukis, Los Caminantes, Rigo Tovar, Timbiriche, Flans, Lucero, Thalía, Cristian Castro and Enrique Iglesias. In 2002, Televisa sold it to Univision Music Group, which would later be purchased by Universal Music Group (UMG) in 2008. Since then, Fonovisa acts as a mutual subsidiary between Universal Music México and Universal Music Latino.

== EMI Music Mexico ==
The origins of EMI in Mexico arose in 1965, when Capitol Records arrived in Mexico under the name of Discos Capitol de México to form a local company with the aim of distributing the music of Capitol artists in Mexico. On July 1, 1970, the company, due to circumstances, became managed by Capitol Records' parent conglomerate, Electric & Musical Industries (EMI). After this change in management, the company became known as EMI Capitol de México.

In 1994, it was renamed EMI Music México again. After the purchase of EMI by Universal Music Group, the company and the catalog became part of Universal Music México the same year. UMG México currently uses the EMI logo as imprint.

== Labels ==
- Fonovisa Records
- Virgin Music México
