= La Voz Kids (Spanish TV series) season 11 =

La Voz Kids
- Season 11
- Promotional poster featuring coaches Edurne, Fonsi, Mena, and Orozco
- Hosted by: Eva González; El Monaguillo (backstage host)
- Coaches: Luis Fonsi; Edurne; Ana Mena; Antonio Orozco
- Winner: Eduardo Sánchez
- Winning coach: Antonio Orozco
- Runner-up: Lourdes Evolett

Release
- Original network: Antena 3
- Original release: 9 May – 25 July 2026

Season chronology
- ← Previous; Season 10

The eleventh season of La Voz Kids premiered on 9 May 2026 on Antena 3. This season, only Edurne reprised her role as a coach from the previous season. Antonio Orozco returned after a six-season hiatus, replacing David Bisbal. Former La Voz coach Luis Fonsi and Ana Mena joined as new coaches this season, replacing Manuel Turizo and Lola Índigo, respectively.

Eva González remained as the main host of the program, while El Monaguillo replaced Juanra Bonet as the backstage host.

On 25 July, Eduardo Sánchez was announced as the winner of this season, marking Antonio Orozco's second win as a coach. With Sánchez's win, Orozco became the third coach on La Voz Kids to win twice, following Melendi and Bisbal.

== Coaches and Hosts ==
La Voz Kids Season 11 Coaches and Hosts

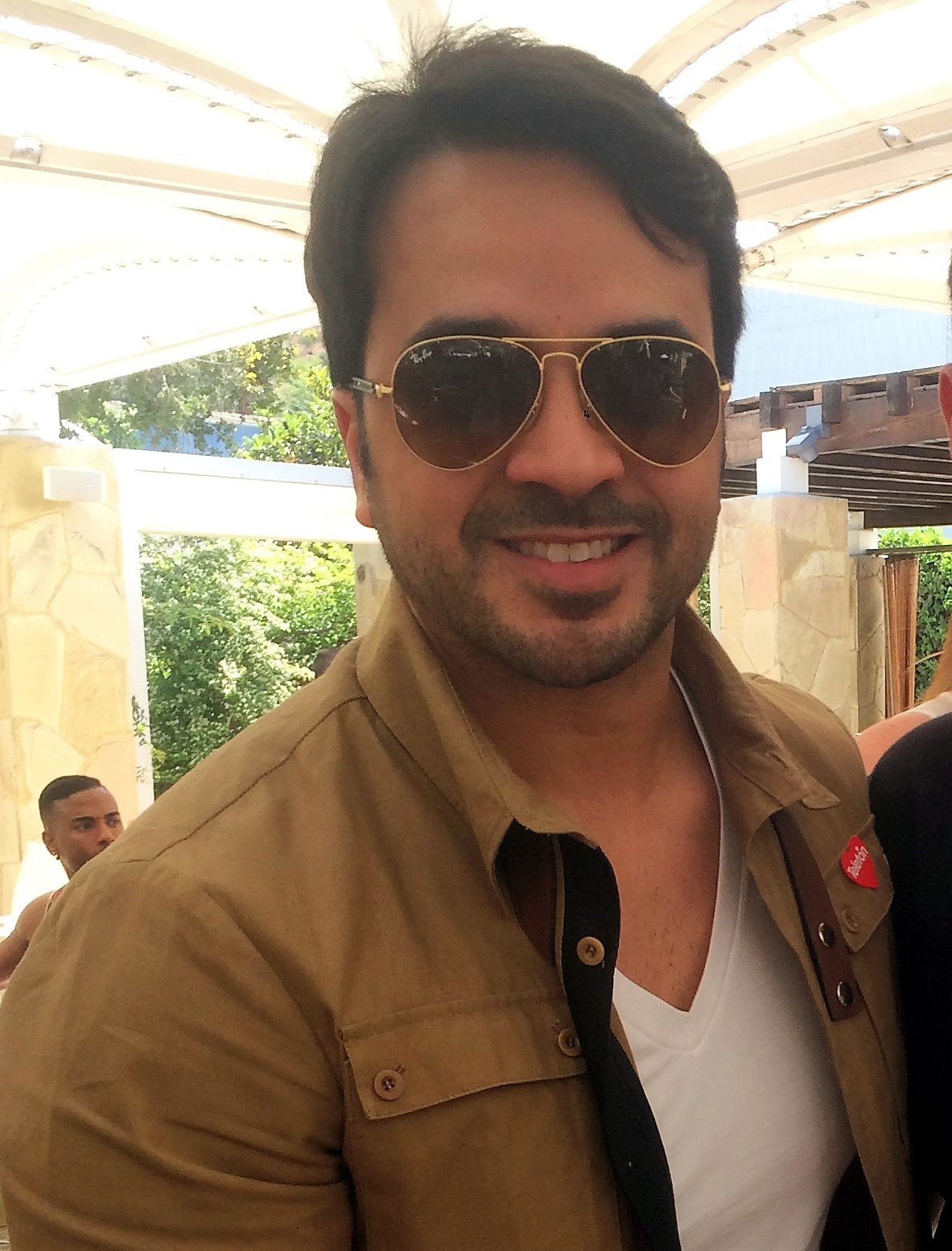
Luis Fonsi

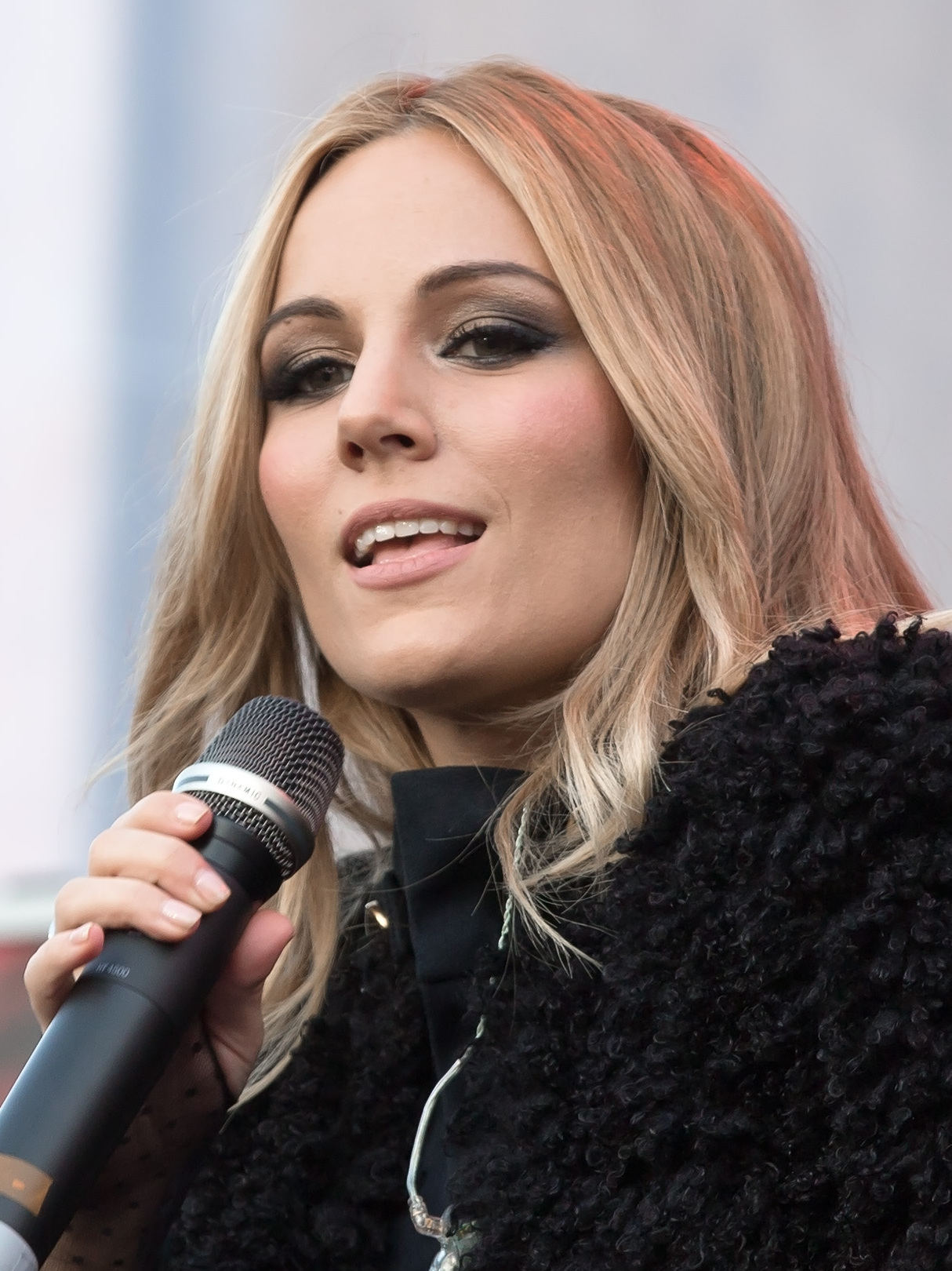
Edurne

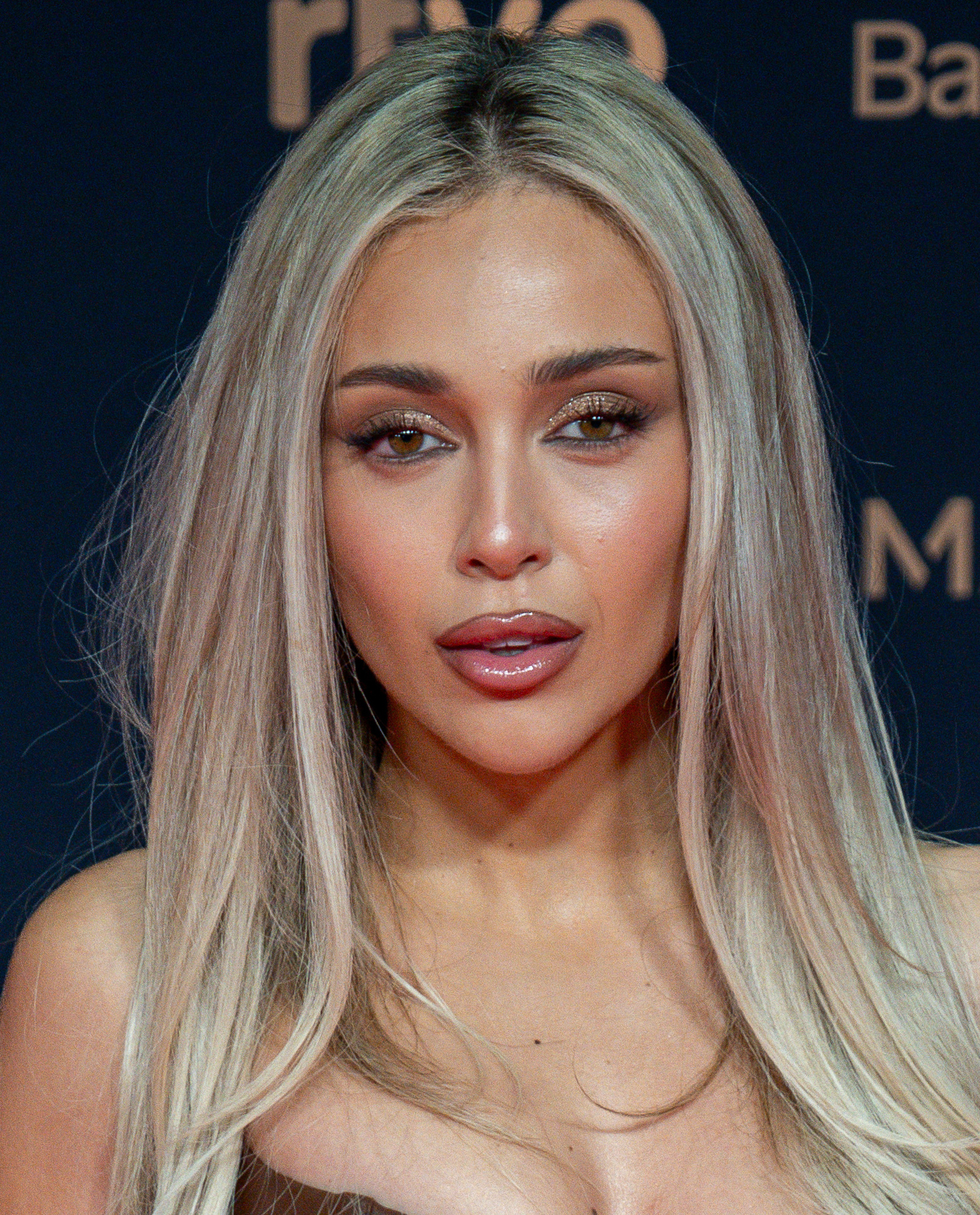
Ana Mena

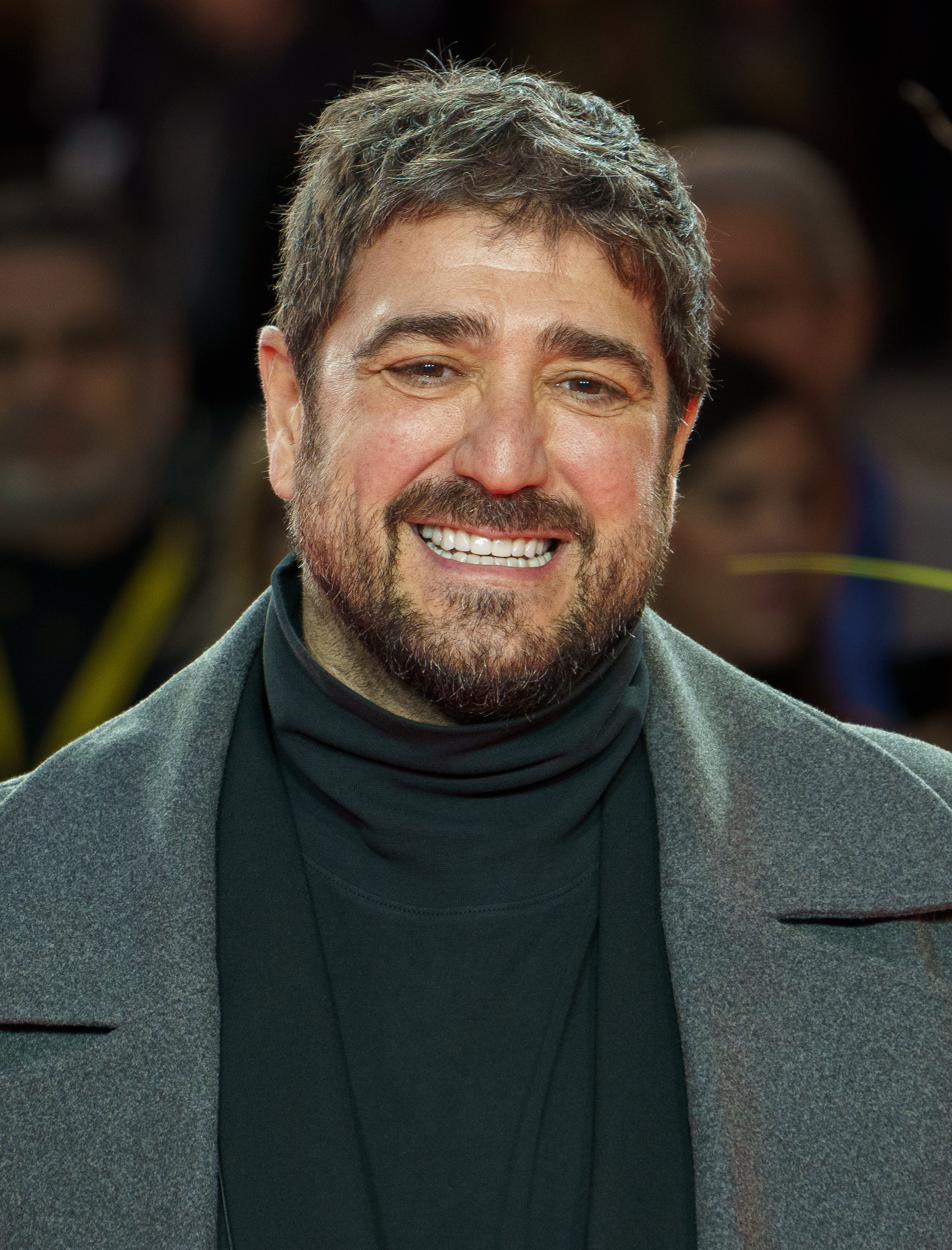
Antonio Orozco

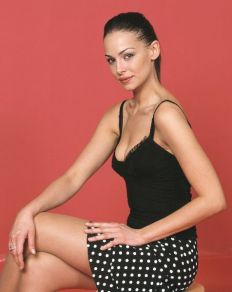
Eva González

El Monaguillo

Of the coaches in the previous season, only Edurne returned, marking her second season as a coach; David Bisbal, Lola Índigo, and Manuel Turizo all departed the panel this season. Former coach Antonio Orozco returned for his third season after last coaching in the fourth season. Meanwhile, former La Voz coach Luis Fonsi and Ana Mena debuted as coaches this season.

== Teams ==
- Winner
- Runner-up
- Third Place
- Fourth Place
- Eliminated in the Finale
- Eliminated in the Semi-final
- Eliminated in the Phase 2 of the Knockouts
- Stolen in Phase 1 of the Knockouts
- Eliminated in Phase 1 of the Knockouts
- Eliminated in the Battles

Coaches	Top 56 Artists				
Luis Fonsi					
Luis Fonsi	Lourdes Evolett	Triana Castillejo	Dani Escrig	Mila Lo Coco	Lola López
Luis Fonsi	~~Erick Sucilla~~	Valeria Palomares	Enzo Rodríguez	Candela Camaño	Martina Castells
Luis Fonsi	Victoria Fortes	Sofía Hernández	Claudia Moreno	Rocío Querencio	Sergio Rodríguez
Edurne					
Edurne	Martina Pérez	Mia Arias	Lucía Arias	Sophia Isabella	Lucía Salazar
Edurne	~~Skabum~~	Valeria Gonzalez	Sara Segura	Miranda Andrea	Judith Corbella
Edurne	Aitor Ibañez	Hugo Marrero	Hattie Rose	Valentina Valcárcel	Marcos Zorrilla
Ana Mena					
Ana Mena	Marco Lahoz	Erick Sucilla	Sol	Leo Ainstein	Marta Thomas
Ana Mena	~~Triana Castillejo~~	Deyerid Díaz	Lola Pérez	Oriol Aldabó	Leyre Blasco
Ana Mena	Antonella Cantero	Jimena Franco	Juliette Livia	Lúa López	Carmen Prado
Antonio Orozco					
Antonio Orozco	Eduardo Sánchez	Leire Cornejo	Skabum	Diego Gómez	Celia León
Antonio Orozco	~~Lucía Arias~~	Isabel Castilla	Tomás Marín	Mar Asuar	Ainhoa Baeza
Antonio Orozco	Ángela Expósito	Luis Francisco	Elsa Galán	Darío Gil	Mariam Zubashvili
Note: Italicized names are stolen contestants (names struck through within former teams).

== Blind Auditions ==
The show began with the Blind Auditions on 9 May 2026. In each audition, an artist sings their piece in front of the coaches, whose chairs face the audience. If a coach is interested in working with the artist, they may press their button to face the artist. If only one coach presses the button, the artist automatically becomes part of their team.

The "block" buttons return, with each coach being given three blocks. When a coach presses the block button during a performance, the blocked coach's chair does not turn around. The "superblock" button also returns being used after the performance is complete, and the coaches are pitching for the artist. The superblocked coach's chair turns back to the audience. Each coach has 3 superblocks each. Two coaches can be blocked in one audition. At the end of the blind auditions, Fonsi only used one superblock, Edurne did not use her second block or her third superblock, and Ana did not use her third superblock.

This season, two new features were introduced; both were featured on the twelfth season of La Voz. Firstly, the "megablock" feature was added. First introduced on The Voice Kids Italy, this feature, given once to each coach, allows a coach to block every other coach, automatically defaulting the artist to their team. Additionally, each coach receives one "botón del arrepentimiento" (repentance button) to use. The concept, introduced on the 26th season of The Voice USA, allows a coach to acquire an originally eliminated artist (the artist did not receive a turn in the duration of their performance) and save that artist once all the chairs have spun around. At the end of the blind auditions, Edurne did not use her "mega block" or her "botón del arrepentimiento".

Blind auditions color key
✔	Coach pressed their "QUIERO TU VOZ" button
	Artist selected a coach's team
	Artist defaulted to a coach's team
	Artist was eliminated
	Artist was originally eliminated, but a coach pressed the "Botón del Arrepentimiento"
✘	Coach pressed their "QUIERO TU VOZ" button, but was blocked by another coach from getting the artist
✘	Coach pressed their "QUIERO TU VOZ" button, but was superblocked by another coach from getting the artist
✘	Coach pressed their "QUIERO TU VOZ" button, but was megablocked by another coach from getting the artist
	Blocked by Fonsi; Blocked by Edurne; Blocked by Ana; Blocked by Antonio

Blind auditions result
Episode	Order	Artist	Age	Song	Coach's and artist's choices			
Episode	Order	Artist	Age	Song	Fonsi	Edurne	Ana	Antonio
Episode 1 (9 May)	1	Triana Castillejo	7	"Señora"	✔	✔	✔	✔
Episode 1 (9 May)	2	Celia León	13	"Memory"	✘	✘	✘	✔
Episode 1 (9 May)	3	Lourdes Evolett	14	"En cambio no"	✔	✔	—	✔
Episode 1 (9 May)	4	Leo Ainstein	13	"Defying Gravity"	✘	✘	✔	✔
Episode 1 (9 May)	5	Isabel Castilla	14	"Lose Control"	—	—	—	✔
Episode 1 (9 May)	6	Lucía Salazar	9	"Estando contigo"	✔	✔	—	—
Episode 1 (9 May)	7	Elsa Galán	9	"La Gata Bajo la Lluvia"	—	✔	—	✔
Episode 1 (9 May)	8	José Romero	11	"Letras por bulerías"	—	—	—	—
Episode 1 (9 May)	9	Valeria Palomares	12	"Girl on Fire"	✔	✔	—	—
Episode 1 (9 May)	10	Claudia Perez	12	"Di mi nombre"	—	—	—	—
Episode 1 (9 May)	11	Mia Arias	10	"Unstoppable"	✘	✔	✔	✔
Episode 2 (16 May)	1	Eduardo Sánchez	13	"Tangos caleteros"	✔	✔	✔	✔
Episode 2 (16 May)	2	Victoria Fortes	11	"I See Red"	✔	✘	✘	✘
Episode 2 (16 May)	3	Oriol Aldabó	15	"Jealous"	—	—	✔	—
Episode 2 (16 May)	4	Tomás Marín	8	"No hay nadie más"	✘	✘	—	✔
Episode 2 (16 May)	5	Skabum	8–12	"Sweet Dreams"	✔	✔	✔	✔
Episode 2 (16 May)	6	Carmen Prado	10	"No callaré"	✔	—	✔	✔
Episode 2 (16 May)	7	Lucía Arias	11	"Confieso"	✔	✔	✘	✔
Episode 2 (16 May)	8	Carla Luaña	14	"People Help the People"	—	—	—	—
Episode 2 (16 May)	9	Jimena Franco	12	"Cómo han pasado los años"	—	—	✔	—
Episode 2 (16 May)	10	Enzo Rodríguez	10	"Roma"	✔	—	—	✔
Episode 2 (16 May)	11	Inés Pineros	12	"Je Vole"	—	—	—	—
Episode 2 (16 May)	12	Aitor Ibañez	12	"Amanecer"	—	✔	—	✔
Episode 3 (23 May)	1	Lola López	9	"Blanco y negro"	✔	—	—	—
Episode 3 (23 May)	2	Martina Pérez	11	"Que hablen de mi"	✔	✔	✘	✘
Episode 3 (23 May)	3	Lola Pérez	14	"La Mudanza"	—	✔	✔	✘
Episode 3 (23 May)	4	Diego Gómez	11	"Pena penita pena"	—	—	—	—
Episode 3 (23 May)	5	Leire Cornejo	15	"Highway to Hell"	✔	✔	—	✔
Episode 3 (23 May)	6	Miranda Andrea	11	"Angels like You"	—	✔	—	—
Episode 3 (23 May)	7	Sergio Rodríguez	15	"Stay"	✔	✔	✔	✘
Episode 3 (23 May)	8	Darío Gil	14	"La Despedida"	—	—	—	✔
Episode 3 (23 May)	9	Sofía Hernández	14	"Hymne a L´amour"	✔	—	✔	—
Episode 3 (23 May)	10	Mar Asuar	13	"Te juro que no hay un segundo que no piense en ti"	—	✔	—	✔
Episode 3 (23 May)	11	María Romero	9	"La rosa"	—	—	—	—
Episode 3 (23 May)	12	Juliette Livia	12	"Vampire"	—	✔	✔	✔
Episode 4 (30 May)	1	Marta Thomas	15	"Fingers Crossed"	—	✔	✔	—
Episode 4 (30 May)	2	Valentina Valcárcel	9	"Somewhere Over the Rainbow"	✔	✔	✔	✔
Episode 4 (30 May)	3	Marco Lahoz	15	"In the Stars"	✔	✔	✔	—
Episode 4 (30 May)	4	Aitana Mejías	10	"Popular"	—	—	—	—
Episode 4 (30 May)	5	Hugo Marrero	8	"El Sol No Regresa"	✘	✔	—	✔
Episode 4 (30 May)	6	Luis Francisco	13	"Cuando Nadie Me Ve"	✔	—	—	✔
Episode 4 (30 May)	7	Isabel Sánchez	15	"Rise Up"	—	—	—	—
Episode 4 (30 May)	8	Candela Camaño	13	"Dernière danse"	✔	✔	—	—
Episode 4 (30 May)	9	Judith Corbella	13	"El Amor de Mi Vida"	✘	✔	✔	✔
Episode 4 (30 May)	10	Dani Escrig	10	"Never Enough"	✔	—	—	—
Episode 4 (30 May)	11	Mar Lázaro	12	"Deja huella"	—	—	—	—
Episode 4 (30 May)	12	Marcos Zorrilla	11	"Beautiful Things"	—	✔	—	✔
Episode 5 (6 June)	1	Martina Castells	13	"Drivers License"	✔	✔	—	✔
Episode 5 (6 June)	2	Diego Gómez	11	"Limosna de amores"	✔	✔	✔	✔
Episode 5 (6 June)	3	Ángela Expósito	15	"90 minutos"	—	—	—	✔
Episode 5 (6 June)	4	Mila Lo Coco	7	"Un mundo ideal"	✔	✔	✘	✔
Episode 5 (6 June)	5	Álvaro González	15	"Si tus piernas	—	—	—	—
Episode 5 (6 June)	6	Valeria Gonzalez	14	"Someone You Loved"	✔	✔	—	—
Episode 5 (6 June)	7	Claudia Moreno	12	"Contar mentiras"	✔	—	—	✘
Episode 5 (6 June)	8	Lúa López	12	"Diamonds"	✔	—	✔	✔
Episode 5 (6 June)	9	Ainhoa Baeza	11	"Mi héroe"	—	—	—	✔
Episode 5 (6 June)	10	Sol	15	"The Ghost of You"	—	—	✔	✔
Episode 5 (6 June)	11	Daniela Sánchez Arévalo	10	"Journey to the Past"	—	—	—	—
Episode 5 (6 June)	12	Mariam Zubashvili	14	"My All"	✔	✔	—	✔
Episode 6 (13 June)	1	Leyre Blasco	10	"Set Fire to the Rain"	✔	✘	✔	Team full
Episode 6 (13 June)	2	Leo González	11	"Die with a Smile"	—	—	—	Team full
Episode 6 (13 June)	3	Deyerid Díaz	13	"Amor eterno"	✘	✘	✔	Team full
Episode 6 (13 June)	4	Rocío Querencio	13	"Hoy te quiero decir"	✔	—	✔	Team full
Episode 6 (13 June)	5	Martina Fernández	12	"Miedo"	—	—	—	Team full
Episode 6 (13 June)	6	Sara Segura	12	"Voilà"	✘	✔	✘	Team full
Episode 6 (13 June)	7	Martina Soler	10	"Y ahora"	—	—	—	Team full
Episode 6 (13 June)	8	Erick Sucilla	11	"Volver a amar"	✔	✘	✔	Team full
Episode 6 (13 June)	9	Sophia Isabella	12	"Antes de Ti"	Team full	✔	✘	Team full
Episode 6 (13 June)	10	Lucía Reguera	14	"Creo en mí"	Team full	—	—	Team full
Episode 6 (13 June)	11	Hattie Rose	10	"All I Want"	Team full	✔	✘	Team full
Episode 6 (13 June)	12	Antonella Cantero	11	"Wildflower"	Team full	Team full	✔	Team full

== Great Battles ==
The great battles aired on 20 June 2026. Like the previous season, the artists are placed in groups of four or five. Decisions are made following all battles from that respective team, with each coach electing seven total artists to advance to the knockouts. Like the previous two seasons, there are no steals in this round. In addition, coaches' advisors help them on deciding who will be advancing to the next round; Melody for Team Fonsi, Leire Martínez for Team Edurne, Becky G for Team Ana, and Antoñito Molina for Team Antonio.

Battles color key
Artist was chosen by his/her coach to advance to the Knockouts
Artist was eliminated

=== Episode 7 (20 June) ===
Seventh episode's results
Order	Coach	Winner	Songs	Losers
1	Antonio Orozco	Diego Gómez	"No es lo mismo"	Ainhoa Baeza
1	Antonio Orozco	Eduardo Sánchez	"No es lo mismo"	Ángela Expósito
1	Antonio Orozco	Eduardo Sánchez	"No es lo mismo"	Luis Francisco
2	Antonio Orozco	Celia León	"Cuando hables con él"	Mar Asuar
2	Antonio Orozco	Tomás Marín	"Cuando hables con él"	Darío Gil
2	Antonio Orozco	Lucía Arias	"Cuando hables con él"	Darío Gil
3	Antonio Orozco	Isabel Castilla	"What Other People Say"	Elsa Galán
3	Antonio Orozco	Leire Cornejo	"What Other People Say"	Mariam Zubashvili
4	Luis Fonsi	Enzo Rodríguez	"Tightrope"	N/A
4	Luis Fonsi	Lola López	"Tightrope"	N/A
4	Luis Fonsi	Mila Lo Coco	"Tightrope"	N/A
4	Luis Fonsi	Dani Escrig	"Tightrope"	N/A
5	Luis Fonsi	Valeria Palomares	"Confident"	Candela Camaño
5	Luis Fonsi	Valeria Palomares	"Confident"	Martina Castells
5	Luis Fonsi	Valeria Palomares	"Confident"	Victoria Fortes
5	Luis Fonsi	Valeria Palomares	"Confident"	Sofía Hernández
6	Luis Fonsi	Lourdes Evolett	"Ciego"	Claudia Moreno
6	Luis Fonsi	Erick Sucilla	"Ciego"	Rocío Querencio
6	Luis Fonsi	Erick Sucilla	"Ciego"	Sergio Rodríguez
7	Edurne	Mia Arias	"Locked Out of Heaven"	Aitor Ibañez
7	Edurne	Skabum	"Locked Out of Heaven"	Hugo Marrero
7	Edurne	Skabum	"Locked Out of Heaven"	Marcos Zorrilla
8	Edurne	Lucía Salazar	"Lady Marmalade"	Judith Corbella
8	Edurne	Martina Pérez	"Lady Marmalade"	Judith Corbella
8	Edurne	Valeria Gonzalez	"Lady Marmalade"	Judith Corbella
8	Edurne	Sophia Isabella	"Lady Marmalade"	Judith Corbella
9	Edurne	Sara Segura	"Best Part"	Miranda Andrea
9	Edurne	Sara Segura	"Best Part"	Hattie Rose
9	Edurne	Sara Segura	"Best Part"	Valentina Valcárcel
10	Ana Mena	Triana Castillejo	"Respirar"	Carmen Prado
10	Ana Mena	Lola Pérez	"Respirar"	Jimena Franco
10	Ana Mena	Deyerid Díaz	"Respirar"	Jimena Franco
11	Ana Mena	Leo Ainstein	"Pray"	Lúa López
11	Ana Mena	Leo Ainstein	"Pray"	Leyre Blasco
11	Ana Mena	Leo Ainstein	"Pray"	Juliette Livia
11	Ana Mena	Leo Ainstein	"Pray"	Antonella Cantero
12	Ana Mena	Marta Thomas	"Blame's on Me"	Oriol Aldabó
12	Ana Mena	Sol	"Blame's on Me"	Oriol Aldabó
12	Ana Mena	Marco Lahoz	"Blame's on Me"	Oriol Aldabó

== Knockouts ==
=== Phase 1 ===
Phase 1 of the Knockouts aired on 27 June and 4 July.

In the first phase, the seven artists on each team will perform one by one, singing their blind audition song. One artist will receive the 'Fast-Pass (Pase Directo)' and directly advance to the semi-final. Three artists will be put in the 'Danger Zone' where they will compete for one remaining spot in the second phase. In addition, each coach was given a 'Steal' to get an artist from another team to advance to the Lives. Once an artist is announced to be put into the 'Danger Zone', the coach whose 'Steal' is still available will have the chance to steal the artist. Artists who got stolen will automatically advance to the semi-final. After an artist got stolen, the coach of the team then chooses another artist for the 'Danger Zone'. This procedure comes to an end once there are three artists officially in the 'Danger Zone'. The remaining artists will be eliminated in this round and won't have the chance to compete next week. Additionally, the advisors from the battles were present in the round and helped the coaches with decisions.

The first episode of the Knockouts features Team Ana and Team Edurne. Ana Mena and her advisor Becky G performed "Dreaming of You" and "El beso del final". Edurne and her advisor Leire Martínez took the stage with "Mi nombre".

The second episode of the Knockouts features Team Fonsi and Team Antonio. Luis Fonsi and his advisor Melody performed "Aquí Estoy Yo". Antonio Orozco and his advisor Antoñito Molina performed "Entre sobras y sobras me faltas".

Knockouts (Phase 1) color key
Artist got a 'Fast-Pass' and advanced to the semi-final
Artist was stolen by another coach and advanced to the semi-final
Artist put in the 'Danger Zone' and entered Phase 2
Artist was eliminated

Knockouts Results
Episode	Coach	Order	Artist	Song	Results
Episode 8 (27 June)	Ana Mena	1	Triana Castillejo	"Señora"	Stolen by Fonsi
Episode 8 (27 June)	Ana Mena	2	Leo Ainstein	"Defying Gravity"	Danger Zone
Episode 8 (27 June)	Ana Mena	3	Marco Lahoz	"In the Stars"	Fast-Pass
Episode 8 (27 June)	Ana Mena	4	Sol	"The Ghost of You"	Danger Zone
Episode 8 (27 June)	Ana Mena	5	Deyerid Díaz	"Amor eterno"	Eliminated
Episode 8 (27 June)	Ana Mena	6	Lola Pérez	"La Mudanza"	Eliminated
Episode 8 (27 June)	Ana Mena	7	Marta Thomas	"Fingers Crossed"	Danger Zone
Episode 8 (27 June)	Edurne	8	Skabum	"Sweet Dreams"	Stolen by Antonio
Episode 8 (27 June)	Edurne	9	Martina Pérez	"Que hablen de mi"	Danger Zone
Episode 8 (27 June)	Edurne	10	Lucía Salazar	"Estando contigo"	Danger Zone
Episode 8 (27 June)	Edurne	11	Sophia Isabella	"Antes de Ti"	Danger Zone
Episode 8 (27 June)	Edurne	12	Valeria Gonzalez	"Someone You Loved"	Eliminated
Episode 8 (27 June)	Edurne	13	Sara Segura	"Voilà"	Eliminated
Episode 8 (27 June)	Edurne	14	Mia Arias	"Unstoppable"	Fast-Pass
Episode 9 (4 July)	Luis Fonsi	1	Lourdes Evolett	"En cambio no"	Danger Zone
Episode 9 (4 July)	Luis Fonsi	2	Erick Sucilla	"Volver a amar"	Stolen by Ana
Episode 9 (4 July)	Luis Fonsi	3	Valeria Palomares	"Girl on Fire"	Eliminated
Episode 9 (4 July)	Luis Fonsi	4	Mila Lo Coco	"Un mundo ideal"	Danger Zone
Episode 9 (4 July)	Luis Fonsi	5	Enzo Rodríguez	"Roma"	Eliminated
Episode 9 (4 July)	Luis Fonsi	6	Lola López	"Blanco y negro"	Danger Zone
Episode 9 (4 July)	Luis Fonsi	7	Dani Escrig	"Never Enough"	Fast-Pass
Episode 9 (4 July)	Antonio Orozco	8	Eduardo Sánchez	"Tangos caleteros"	Danger Zone
Episode 9 (4 July)	Antonio Orozco	9	Celia León	"Memory"	Danger Zone
Episode 9 (4 July)	Antonio Orozco	10	Leire Cornejo	"Highway to Hell"	Fast-Pass
Episode 9 (4 July)	Antonio Orozco	11	Diego Gómez	"Limosna de amores"	Danger Zone
Episode 9 (4 July)	Antonio Orozco	12	Tomás Marín	"No hay nadie más"	Eliminated
Episode 9 (4 July)	Antonio Orozco	13	Isabel Castilla	"Lose Control"	Eliminated
Episode 9 (4 July)	Antonio Orozco	14	Lucía Arias	"Confieso"	Stolen by Edurne

=== Phase 2 ===
Phase 2 of the Knockouts aired on 11 July.

In the second phase, the remaining three artists on each team that were placed in the 'Danger Zone' in the first phase perform individually for the final spot left on their coaches' team in the semi-final. At the end of the round, only one artist moves on and the other two are eliminated from the competition from the studio audience vote. The coaches' advisors once again were present.

Knockouts (Phase 2) color key
Artist was saved by studio audience and advanced to the semi-final
Artist was eliminated

Final Knockouts Results
Episode	Coach	Order	Artist	Song	Result
Episode 10 (11 July)	Edurne	1	Lucía Salazar	"Por fin ya veo la luz"	Eliminated
Episode 10 (11 July)	Edurne	2	Sophia Isabella	"Ya Te Olvidé"	Eliminated
Episode 10 (11 July)	Edurne	3	Martina Pérez	"The Power of Love"	Audience's vote
Episode 10 (11 July)	Ana Mena	4	Marta Thomas	"Say Something"	Eliminated
Episode 10 (11 July)	Ana Mena	5	Leo Ainstein	"Before You Go"	Eliminated
Episode 10 (11 July)	Ana Mena	6	Sol	"Hallelujah"	Audience's vote
Episode 10 (11 July)	Luis Fonsi	7	Lola López	"El mundo"	Eliminated
Episode 10 (11 July)	Luis Fonsi	8	Lourdes Evolett	"Víveme"	Audience's vote
Episode 10 (11 July)	Luis Fonsi	9	Mila Lo Coco	"When You Wish Upon a Star"	Eliminated
Episode 10 (11 July)	Antonio Orozco	10	Diego Gómez	"Como te imaginé"	Eliminated
Episode 10 (11 July)	Antonio Orozco	11	Celia León	"Piensa en mí"	Eliminated
Episode 10 (11 July)	Antonio Orozco	12	Eduardo Sánchez	"La Niña de Fuego"	Audience's vote

== Final phase ==
The final phase aired on 24 and 25 July. In the semi-final round, the top twelve artists perform for eight spots in the finale. One artist from each team moves on from the public vote and the other is selected by his/her coach. In the finale, the round is divided into two parts. In round one, the two artists remaining on each team sing solo and with their team's advisor. Then, each coach selects one of the two artists remaining on his/her team to move on the grand finale. The top four artists perform with their coaches, and, following this, the public votes for the winner of the season.

=== Night 1: Semi-final (24 July) ===
At the beginning of the episode, the three artists on each team performed a song to their respective coach with David Bustamante. During the episode, Abraham Mateo performed "A media luz" with Teams Fonsi and Ana, while Rosario Flores performed "Sabor, sabor" with Teams Antonio and Edurne. At the end of the show, La La Love You performed "El fin del mundo" with the eight finalists.

Semi-final color key
Artist was chosen by the public to advance to the Finale
Artist was chosen by his/her coach to advance to the Finale
Artist was eliminated

Order	Coach	Artist	Song	Result
1	Luis Fonsi	Triana Castillejo	"Hoy quiero confesar"	Fonsi's Choice
2	Luis Fonsi	Dani Escrig	"A Million Dreams"	Eliminated
3	Luis Fonsi	Lourdes Evolett	"Mi vida sin tu amor"	Advanced
4	Ana Mena	Marco Lahoz	"Car's Outside"	Ana's Choice
5	Ana Mena	Sol	"Wrecking Ball"	Eliminated
6	Ana Mena	Erick Sucilla	"No sé vivir si no es contigo"	Advanced
7	Antonio Orozco	Eduardo Sánchez	"Soy minero"	Advanced
8	Antonio Orozco	Skabum	"Everybody"	Eliminated
9	Antonio Orozco	Leire Cornejo	"Sweet Child o' Mine"	Antonio's Choice
10	Edurne	Lucía Arias	"Mientes"	Eliminated
11	Edurne	Martina Pérez	"Hero"	Edurne's Choice
12	Edurne	Mia Arias	"Symphony"	Advanced

=== Night 2: Finale (25 July) ===
==== Round one ====
At the beginning of the episode, former coach Pablo López performed "Como soy" with all ten previous winners of the show. During the episode, Manuel Turizo performed "Mírame ahora" with previous season's winner, Lucas Paulano.

Finale color key
Artist was chosen by his/her coach to advance to round two
Artist was eliminated

Order	Coach	Artist	Song	Duet with team advisor	Result
1	Luis Fonsi	Triana Castillejo	"La Gata Bajo la Lluvia"	"Mujer loba" (with Melody)	Eliminated
2	Luis Fonsi	Lourdes Evolett	"Ángel caído"	"Mujer loba" (with Melody)	Fonsi's Choice
3	Ana Mena	Marco Lahoz	"Talking to the Moon"	"Ahora que estoy bien" (with Belén Aguilera)	Ana's Choice
4	Ana Mena	Erick Sucilla	"Se nos rompió el amor"	"Ahora que estoy bien" (with Belén Aguilera)	Eliminated
5	Edurne	Martina Pérez	"Sola otra vez"	"Jueves" (with Leire Martínez)	Edurne's Choice
6	Edurne	Mia Arias	"Golden"	"Jueves" (with Leire Martínez)	Eliminated
7	Antonio Orozco	Leire Cornejo	"The Show Must Go On"	"Me prometo" (with Antoñito Molina)	Eliminated
8	Antonio Orozco	Eduardo Sánchez	"Alfileres de colores"	"Me prometo" (with Antoñito Molina)	Antonio's Choice

- Note: Becky G, the advisor for Team Ana, was not present in the episode and Ana's team instead performed with Belén Aguilera.

==== Round two ====
At the end of the show, Eduardo Sánchez from Team Antonio was crowned the winner of the season. Orozco became the third coach to win La Voz Kids twice, following Melendi and David Bisbal.

Order	Coach	Artist	Duet with coach	Result
1	Edurne	Martina Peréz	"La mala costumbre"	Fourth place
2	Ana Mena	Marco Lahoz	"Quiero decirte"	Third place
3	Antonio Orozco	Eduardo Sánchez	"Pedacitos de ti"	Winner
4	Luis Fonsi	Lourdes Evolett	"No me doy por vencido"	Runner-up

=== Overall ===
Color key
Artist's info

- Team Fonsi
- Team Edurne
- Team Ana
- Team Antonio

Result details

- Winner
- Runner-up
- Third Place
- Fourth Place
- Saved by the public
- Saved by the coach
- Eliminated

Live Show Results per week
Artists	Semifinal, Top 12	Grand finale	
Eduardo Sánchez	Safe	Safe	Winner
Lourdes Evolett	Safe	Safe	Runner-up
Marco Lahoz	Safe	Safe	Third place
Martina Pérez	Safe	Safe	Fourth place
Mia Arias	Safe	Eliminated	Eliminated (Round One)
Triana Castillejo	Safe	Eliminated	Eliminated (Round One)
Leire Cornejo	Safe	Eliminated	Eliminated (Round One)
Erick Sucilla	Safe	Eliminated	Eliminated (Round One)
Lucía Arias	Eliminated	Eliminated (Semifinal)	
Dani Escrig	Eliminated	Eliminated (Semifinal)	
Skabum	Eliminated	Eliminated (Semifinal)	
Sol	Eliminated	Eliminated (Semifinal)	
