= List of works performed by American Ballet Theatre =

This is an alphabetical list of works performed by American Ballet Theatre, a classical ballet company based at the Metropolitan Opera House, New York City.

Title	Choreographer	Composer	Designer	ABT premiere
Adagio for Strings	John Meehan	Samuel Barber		8 May 1980
Afternoon of a Faun	Jerome Robbins	Claude Debussy		19 October 2005
Afternoon of a Faun	Vaslav Nijinsky	Claude Debussy	Nicholas Georgiadis	4 November 1941
Airs	Paul Taylor	George Frideric Handel		8 May 1980
Aleko	Léonide Massine	Pyotr Ilyich Tchaikovsky	Marc Chagall	12 July 1968
Allegro Brillante	John Meehan	Samuel Barber		8 May 1980
Amazed in Burning Dreams	Kirk Peterson	Philip Glass	Kirk Peterson, Larae Hascall	31 October 2001
Americans We	Twyla Tharp	Donald Hunsberger	Santo Loquasto	1 May 1995
Amnon V'Tamar	Martine van Hamel	George Calusdian	Theoni V. Aldredge	8 January 1984
L'Amour at son Amour	Jean Babilée	César Franck	Jean Cocteau	17 April 1951
Anastasia	Sir Kenneth MacMillan	Pyotr Ilyich Tchaikovsky	Bob Crowley	3 June 1999
Angrismene	William Dollar	Igor Stravinsky		21 April 1958
Annabel Lee	George Skibine	Byron Schiffman		6 May 1957
Apollo	George Balanchine	Igor Stravinsky		27 April 1937
Appalachian Spring	Martha Graham	Aaron Copland	Martha Graham	1 June 1989
Artemis	Lar Lubovitch	Christopher Theofanidis	Ann Hould-Ward	20 May 2003
At Midnight	Eliot Feld	Gustav Mahler	Stanley Simmons	1 December 1967
Awakening	Robert Weiss	Craig Steven Shuler	Susan Tammany	30 December 1975
The Awakening Pas de deux	Frederick Ashton	Pyotr Ilyich Tchaikovsky	Lila De Nobili	17 May 2010
Bach Partita	Twyla Tharp	Johann Sebastian Bach	Santo Loquasto	9 December 1983
Le Baiser de la Fee	John Neumeier	Igor Stravinsky, Pyotr Ilyich Tchaikovsky	Jürgen Rosen	18 July 1984
Baker's Dozen	Twyla Tharp	Willie "The Lion" Smith	Santo Loquasto	30 August 2007
Le Bal	Robert Joffrey	Emmanuel Chabrier		20 May 1957
Baladen der Liebe	Enrique Martinez	Max Bruch	Robert Davison	23 September 1965
Ballet Imperial	George Balanchine	Pyotr Ilyich Tchaikovsky	Rouben Ter-Arutunian	10 February 1988
Ballo Della Regina	George Balanchine	Giuseppe Verdi	Dale Wibben	23 October 2007
Barn Dance	Catherine Littlefield	David Guion, John Powell, Louis Gottschalk	Salvatore Pinto	9 May 1944
Baroque Game	Robert Hill	Dmitry Polischuk	Santo Loquasto	28 October 1999
La Bayadère	Natalia Makarova	Ludwig Minkus, John Lanchbery	Theoni V. Aldredge	21 May 1980
Beatrice	Richard Wagner	Ralph Vaughan Williams		11 May 1964
The Beloved	Bronislava Nijinska, Darius Mihaud	Franz Schubert, Franz Liszt	Nicolas de Molas	24 October 1941
Billy the Kid	Eugene Loring	Aaron Copland	Jared French	8 December 1940
Birthday Offering	Sir Frederick Ashton	Alexander Glazunov	Andre Levasseur	25 October 1989
Bitter Rainbow	Fernand Nault	Nelson Keyes	Ming Tyler Dick	11 May 1964
Black Ritual (Obeah)	Agnes de Mille	Darius Milhaud	Nicholas de Molas	22 January 1940
Black Tuesday		Giuseppe Verdi	Santo Loquasto	10 April 2001
Blood Wedding	Alfred Rodrigues	Denis Aplvor	Dale Wibben	6 May 1957
Bluebeard	Michel Fokine	Jacques Offenbach	Marcel Vertès	27 October 1941
Bolero (Solo)	Maurice Ravel	Anton Dolin		6 December 1932
Boléro	Maurice Ravel	La Argentinita, Pilar López Júlvez	Federico Rey	7 April 1943
Bourree Fantasque	George Balanchine	Emmanuel Chabrier	Karinska	8 December 1981
Brahms Quintet	Dennis Nahat	Johannes Brahms	Willa Kim	10 December 1969
A Brahms Symphony	Lar Lubovitch	Johannes Brahms		3 March 1995
The Brahms-Haydn Variations	Twyla Tharp	Johannes Brahms	Santo Loquasto	21 March 2000
Brief Fling	Twyla Tharp	Michel Colombier, Percy Grainger	Isaac Mizrahi	28 February 1990
The Bright Stream	Alexei Ratmansky	Dmitri Shostakovich	Elena Markovskaya	21 January 2011
Bruch Violin Concerto No. 1	Clark Tippet	Max Bruch	Dain Marcus	1 December 1987
The Bull's Dancer	Lawrence Gradus	Jacques Ibert		17 December 1963
Bum's Rush	Twyla Tharp	Dick Hyman	Santo Loquasto	9 February 1989
C. to C. (Close to Chuck)	Jorma Elo	Philip Glass	Ralph Rucci	27 October 2007
The Capital of the World	Eugene Loring	George Antheil	Esteban Frances	27 December 1953
Carmen	Roland Petit	Georges Bizet	Antoni Clavé	15 December 1981
Cinderella	Frederick Ashton	Sergei Prokofiev		9 June 2014
Company B	Paul Taylor	The Andrews Sisters	Santo Loquasto	17 October 2008
Coppélia	Enrique Martinez	Léo Delibes	William Pitkin	12 December 1968
Le Corsaire	Konstantin Sergeyev	Adolphe Adam, Cesare Pugni, Léo Delibes, Riccardo Drigo, Prince Oldenbourg	Irina Tibilova, Robert Perdziola	19 June 1998
Cruel World	James Kudelka	Pyotr Ilyich Tchaikovsky	Carmen Alie, Denis Lavoie	29 April 1994
Facsimile	Jerome Robbins	Leonard Bernstein	Irene Sharaff	24& October 1946
Fair at Sorochinsk	David Lichine	Modest Mussorgsky	Nicholas Remisoff	14 October 1943
Fall River Legend	Agnes de Mille	Morton Gould	Miles White	22 April 1948
Fancy Free	Jerome Robbins	Leonard Bernstein	Kermit Love	18 April 1944
Fandango	Antony Tudor	Antonio Soler	Hugh Laing	26 March 1963
Fantaisie Serieuse	Lorca Massine	Erik Satie	Ramonda Gaetani	7 May 1980
La Fille Mal Gardée	Frederick Ashton	Ferdinand Hérold		31 May 2002
Firebird	Michel Fokine	Igor Stravinsky	Marc Chagall	24 October 1945
Firebird	Alexei Ratmansky	Igor Stravinsky	Galina Solovyeva	29 March 2012
Giselle	Jean Coralli, Jules Perrot, Marius Petipa	Adolphe Adam	Anna Anni	12 January 1940
Lady of the Camellias	John Neumeier	Frédéric Chopin	Jürgen Rose	25 May 2010
On The Dnieper	Alexei Ratmansky	Sergei Prokofiev	Galina Solovyeva	1 June 2009
Onegin	John Cranko	Pyotr Ilyich Tchaikovsky	Jürgen Rose	1 June 2001
Othello	Lar Lubovitch	Elliot B. Goldenthal	Ann Hould-Ward	23 May 1997
Paquita	Rudolf Nureyev	Ludwig Minkus	Freddy Wittop	6 July 1971
Les Sylphides	Michel Fokine	Frédéric Chopin, orchestration: Benjamin Britten		13 February 1941
Theme and Variations	George Balanchine	Pyotr Ilyich Tchaikovsky	Theoni V. Aldredge	5 May 1986
Thirteen Diversions	Christopher Wheeldon	Benjamin Britten	Bob Crowley	24 May 2011
This Property is Condemned	Donald Saddler	Genevieve Pitot	Stanley Simmons	13 May 1957
Three-Cornered Hat	Léonide Massine	Manuel de Falla	Pablo Picasso	11 April 1943
Undertow	Antony Tudor	William Schuman	Raymond Breinin	10 April 1945
Unfinished Symphony	Peter van Dijk	Franz Schubert	Kalinowski	18 July 1972
Us	Keith Lee	Gustav Mahler	Marcos Paredes	6 May 1970
Variations on 'America'	Eliot Feld	Charles Ives, William Schuman	Willa Kim	9 January 1982
Variations for Four	Anton Dolin	Marguerite Keogh	Tom Lingwood	25 September 1958
La Ventana	August Bournonville	Hans Christian Lumbye		28 July 1975
Waltz Masquerade	Alexei Ratmansky	Aram Khachaturian	Natia Sirbiladze	18 May 2009
