= Boisvenu =

Boisvenu may refer to:

- Pierre-Hugues Boisvenu (born 1949), Canadian politician
- Sonia Boisvenu (Sonia del Rio) (1940–2023), Canadian classical dancer
