= Sonia del Rio =

Spanish classical dancer (1940–2023)

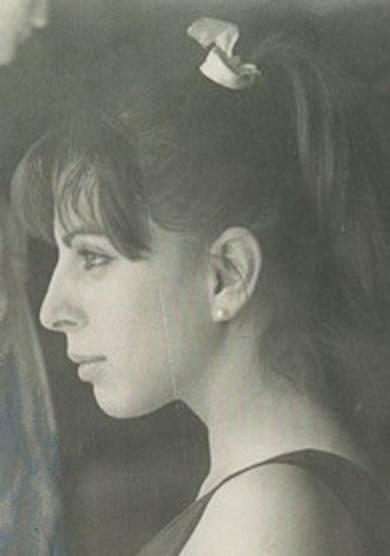
- Sonia del Rio in 1968
- Born: 29 January 1940; Rouyn-Noranda, Quebec, Canada
- Died: 13 October 2023 (aged 83)
- Education: Real Conservatorio de Arte Dramático y Danza de Madrid
- Occupations: Classical dancer, teacher and choreographer
- Title: Teacher and Choreographer, École supérieure de danse
- Website: www.fflam.orgrio

Sonia Del Rio (29 January 1940 – 13 October 2023) was a Spanish classical dancer from Canada. She was the daughter of Émile Boisvenu and Thérèse Jacques.

== Biography ==
Sonia Del Rio was the daughter of Émile Boisvenu and Thérèse Jacques. At age 20 she went to study dance in Europe, first in Paris and then in Spain where she adopted the stage name "del Rio". This name was based on one of her ancestors named "Larivière" which she adapted from French into Spanish.

Her talent was quickly noticed and she evolved in Europe with the prestigious companies Ballet by Pilar López, José de la Vega (National Choreography Prize), José Greco, Mariemma, Pilar de Oro y Alfredo Gil, Rafael Aguilar and, finally, the Antonio ballet. She was also a soloist at the La Scala Opera Theatre in Milan and danced for four years at the Le Châtelet Theatre in Paris, with Luis Mariano. Back home, Mrs. Ludmilla Chiriaeff, founder of Les Grands Ballets Canadiens, asked her to join the École supérieure de danse du Québec. She held the positions of teacher and choreographer there for several years.

She had also shone as a choreographer and principal dancer with the Opéra de Montréal, the Orchestre Symphonique de Montréal and the Orchestre Symphonique de Québec. In 1975, she created the Sonia Del Rio School of Spanish and Flamenco Dance. In the same year she married Claude Normand, a Radio Canada photography director and cameraman, with whom she had one son (Sebastien). Her husband survived her at her death in 2023.

In 1997, hired by Skate Canada, she collaborated on a Spanish choreography with gold medalist Paul Duchesnay for the Junior Figure Skating Team of Quebec. In the summer of the same year, she presented a concert at the Château de Dampierre-sur-Boutonne. The rave reviews from the press earned her a second invitation in July 2000.

Her ultimate award came on 14 October 1998, in the name of His Majesty King Juan Carlos of Spain, the Order of Isabella the Catholic, the highest distinction granted to a foreign artist. In August 1999, Sonia del Rio was named godmother of the Féria de Montréal at the Olympic Stadium, in addition to being a dancer-choreographer of the Great Portuguese Corrida Taurine.

The year 2000 was flamboyant for Sonia del Rio. Among other things, she was invited to set a choreography at the Théâtre du Rideau Vert in Montreal, in a play by Ionesco. In March, she was appointed artistic director of the Muestra Cultural Ibero-latinoamericana in Montreal. On 6 April and 7, she danced Carmen by Georges Bizet, with the Orchestre symphonique de la Montérégie.

In June, she danced the Capriccio Espagnol, by Rimsky-Korsakov, with the Orchestre symphonique de Laval. In July and August, Sonia del Rio made a European tour where she danced, in Barcelona, within the framework of a conference illustrated by the famous dancer José de La Vega, telling the career of the flamenco dance icon of the 1920s and 1930s, Vicente Escudero. Sonia del Rio embodied the role of the partner of the latter, Carmita García.

A grant holder from the Conseil des arts et des lettres du Québec, Sonia del Rio returned to Spain to revitalize her art. Lucía Real and Merche Esmeralda were her teachers. In the summer of 2001, Sonia del Rio bowed out in Spain, in Madrid, as a guest artist at the Coracera Castle Dance Festival on 23 June 2001, with the participation of the Canadian Embassy. She celebrated that evening her forty years of artistic life. Her professional debut dated back to 1961 with the famous Spanish ballet of Pilar López.

Returning to Quebec, the grand lady of Flamenco opened a dance school in Trois-Rivières in September 2001. In the spring of 2002, at the request of actress Sophie Faucher, she performed choreography for the theatre play Apasionada, telling the story of the life of Frida Kahlo, directed by Robert Lepage. Between 2000 and 2010 Sonia del Rio divided her time between France, Spain and Quebec.

In 2008, Sonia del Rio danced at the International Festival of Montguyon in France. Also in 2008, as part of the 400th anniversary celebrations of the founding of Quebec City, she presented, accompanied by actress France Desjarlais and flautist Jean Dury, the evolution of ties between France and Quebec through four hundred years of history.

Between 2005 and 2011, Sonia del Rio occupied the Quebec stages by presenting her conferences. Sonia del Rio illustrated by dancing the historical journey of this production entitled From Île d'Orléans to the Contrescarpe. The show gets great press reviews in France in Le Journal du Sud-Ouest. Flamenco lived, told and danced, by Sonia del Rio among others, at the "Belles Soirées" of the University of Montreal.

Anthology of Spanish Dance was presented at the Château Ramesay with guitarist Serge Beauchemin, at the Château Dufresne with Kristin Molnar on violin and Serge Beauchemin, and at the Chapelle Historique with pianist Marie-Andrée Ostiguy and actress Christine Lamer, without forgetting the musicians Caroline Plante, Dominique Soulard (guitarists) and the singer El Chele (Jose Lumbrera). The 7th Autumn Festival "Organs and Colors" invited Sonia del Rio, accompanied by the organist Régis Rousseau, to present dances from the Spanish Renaissance.

The Montérégie Symphony Orchestra, under the direction of Marc David, presented the concert version of Georges Bizet's opera Carmen. The actor Edgar Fruitier told the story written by Prosper Mérimée, Sonia del Rio danced some excerpts from the famous opera. Trois-Rivières, Terrebonne, Repentigny, Magog and Joliette applauded Sonia del Rio in various concerts.

In December 2010, Sonia Del Rio appeared in the art book El Flamenco que vivi written by José de la Vega. The only Canadian to appear in this book, she rubs shoulders with the greats: Antonio Gades, Ismael Galván, Merche Esmeralda and Maria Pages.

== Awards ==
- 1978 "Artist of the Year" prize awarded by the newspaper Le Soleil of the city of Chateauguay
- 24 June 1998: on the occasion of the National Day of Spain, Mrs. Sonia del Rio (Boisvenu) was decorated IN THE NAME OF HIS MAJESTY KING JUAN CARLOS 1st (q.D.g.) of the Lazo de Dama de la Orden de Isabel la Católica, the highest distinction awarded to a foreign artist for her entire career and services rendered to Spain. Sonia del Rio was ennobled with an honorary title under her civil status name (Iltma. SRA. Dama. Sonia Boisvenu) The Consul General of Spain in Montreal, Mr. Castroviejo, had the honour of decorating Dame Sonia Boisvenu ( del Rio).
- 29 November 1998, the largest daily newspaper in French America, the newspaper La Presse, named Sonia del Rio "Personality of the week".
- 1999: Sonia del Rio was named Godmother of the Feria de Montréal.
- 2000: Sonia del Rio received the prize from the Société du Patrimoine d’Expression du Québec (SPEQ) (Hélène-Baillargeon prize).
- 2000: Journalists from the Spanish community of Montreal from La Voz newspaper named Sonia del Rio “Greater Montreal Artist of the Year”.
- 2016: the Festuval Flamenco de Montréal paid tribute to Sonia del Rio at Théâtre Outremont. The mayor of Montreal, Mr. Denis Coderre, was very proud to contribute to this festival which showcases the diversity of Montreal's culture, its richness and its creativity in the presence of the Consul General of Spain Don Antonio Bullon and his wife. Mr. Bullon took floor to honour Sonia del Rio.
