= Acuario =

2012 solo album by Manuel García

Studio album by Manuel García
- Released: June 12, 2012
- Genre: Electric pop
- Length: 41:20
- Language: Spanish
- Label: Oveja Negra

Manuel García chronology
S/T (2010)	Acuario (2012)	Retrato iluminado (2014)

Acuario is the fourth solo album by Chilean singer-songwriter Manuel García. It was released on July 12, 2012, under the Oveja Negra record label. This is the second album the Arica-born singer has released with this label.

Before the album's release, several activities were carried out for promotion, as well as three shows at the Caupolicán Theater in Santiago after its release.

== Track listing ==
All tracks are written by Manuel García, except where indicated.

No.	Title	Writer(s)	Length
1.	"Madera"	Manuel García, Mauricio Durán	3:31
2.	"Carcelero"	Manuel García, Francisco Durán, Mauricio Durán	3:33
3.	"Un rey y un diez"		2:36
4.	"Acuario"	Manuel García, Mario Villalobos	5:09
5.	"Sueños"		3:51
6.	"Tan dulce, tan triste"		3:44
7.	"Hombre al precipicio"	Francisco Durán, Mauricio Durán	3:47
8.	"El miedo"		3:33
9.	"Caprica"		4:13
10.	"Como partir"		4:16
11.	"La hora nueve"		3:07
Total length:			41:20
