= Flowers (Lauren Spencer-Smith song) =

2022 single by Lauren Spencer-Smith

Single by Lauren Spencer-Smith

from the album Mirror
- Released: April 14, 2022
- Length: 2:37
- Label: Three Name; Island; Republic
- Songwriters: Lauren Spencer-Smith; Cian Ducrot
- Producer: Cian Ducrot

Lauren Spencer-Smith singles chronology
"Fingers Crossed" (2022)	"Flowers" (2022)	"Narcissist" (2022)

Music video
- "Flowers" on YouTube

"Flowers" is a song by Canadian singer-songwriter Lauren Spencer-Smith, released as a single on April 14, 2022. It was co-written and produced by Cian Ducrot. The song charted in various countries and is Spencer-Smith's second highest-charting song after "Fingers Crossed".

== Background ==
"Flowers" is a follow-up to Spencer-Smith's breakthrough hit "Fingers Crossed". She called the song a "contrast" from the "Fingers Crossed", saying that "'Fingers Crossed' was angry. 'Flowers' is sad." The inspiration of the title came from her realization that her previous relationship was unhealthy when her current boyfriend did nice things for her, such as buying flowers for her, which made her cry; before that she only received flowers as an apology. She also said of the song, "'Flowers' is about looking at a past experience and knowing I deserved more. I want people to be able to contemplate their own situations, and learn from them and heal if they need to. You aren't alone and it gets better."

== Composition ==
The song is a "heartbreak ballad", consisting of "intimate" lyrics accompanied by soft piano. Lyrically, Spencer-Smith details how she realized the toxic state of her last relationship upon transitioning to a healthy, new one.

== Guitar version ==
On June 3, 2022, Spencer-Smith released a guitar version of the song.

== Charts ==
Chart performance for "Flowers"
Chart (2022)	Peak position
Australia (ARIA)	26
Canada (Canadian Hot 100)	17
Denmark (Tracklisten)	38
Global 200 (Billboard)	37
Ireland (IRMA)	13
Lebanon (Lebanese Top 20)	15
Netherlands (Single Top 100)	69
New Zealand (Recorded Music NZ)	27
Norway (VG-lista)	11
Portugal (AFP)	66
Sweden (Sverigetopplistan)	48
Switzerland (Schweizer Hitparade)	94
UK Singles (Official Charts)	17
US Billboard Hot 100	55
US Pop Airplay (Billboard)	28

== Certifications ==
Certifications for "Flowers"
Region	Certification	Certified units/sales
Australia (ARIA)	Platinum	70,000^{‡}
Brazil (Pro-Música Brasil)	Gold	20,000^{‡}
Canada (Music Canada)	Platinum	80,000^{‡}
Denmark (IFPI Danmark)	Gold	45,000^{‡}
New Zealand (RMNZ)	Platinum	30,000^{‡}
United Kingdom (BPI)	Platinum	600,000^{‡}
United States (RIAA)	2× Platinum	2,000,000^{‡}
^{‡} Sales+streaming figures based on certification alone.
