= Primaveral =

2017 song by Mon Laferte

Single by Mon Laferte

from the album La Trenza
- Language: Spanish
- Released: October 16, 2017
- Recorded: 2016
- Genre: Pop rock; Latin pop
- Length: 3:51
- Label: Universal
- Songwriter: Mon Laferte
- Producers: Mon Laferte; Manuel Soto

Mon Laferte singles chronology
"Mi Buen Amor" (2017)	"Primaveral" (2017)	"No Te Fumes Mi Mariguana" (2018)

Music video
- "Primaveral" on YouTube

"Primaveral" is a song by Chilean Mexican singer-songwriter Mon Laferte released on 16 October 2017 through Universal Music Group as part of her fourth studio album La Trenza. The song was written by Laferte, produced by herself and Manuel Soto.

== Background ==
This song, according to a publication of La Tercera that reviews the album La Trenza: " [it's] a different theme within the vintage tonic of La Trenza, pop rock with some acoustic tones in half time. 'I'm unstable but you know I love you', ends in the choir that connects with the formula of international pop in the late 60s".

== Music video ==
The music video was directed by Gamaliel de Santiago, it was recorded for two days in Mexican locations such as Condesa, Insurgente and La Marquesa. The clip shows Mon Laferte next to a wooden or cardboard figure as her boyfriend, which is different from she and very fragile, to the point that she can raise it like a comet or break it without wanting an arm, symbolizing in this way the fragile of human relationships, says the artist about it: "The idea of the video was how fragile they are relationships, and in the end we all make mistakes, we hurt, sometimes not wanting to".

The video and the song are a favorite of the Chilean artist, stating: "It's my favorite video of a lifetime. I think it's the most beautiful video we've made. It's beautiful. And the song I think is also my favorite of La Trenza".

== Personnel ==
Credits adapted from La Trenza liner notes.

Vocals

- Mon Laferte – lead vocals
- Juanes – lead vocals
- Esván Lemus – background vocals
- Jerry Velásquez – background vocals
- René Mooi – background vocals

Musicians

- Fermín Fortiz – bass guitar
- Ram – clarinet
- Enrique Lara – guitar
- Juanes – guitar
- Manuel Soto – guitar, organ
- Juan Molina – percussion
- Felipe Sanabria – saxophone
- Erick Rodríguez – trombone
- Humberto Sanabria – trumpet

Production

- Manuel Soto – production
- Eduardo del Águila – mixing, recording
- Alan Ortiz – recording
- Chalo González – recording
- Dave Poler – recording

== Charts ==
=== Weekly charts ===
Weekly chart performance for "Primaveral"
Chart (2017)	Peak position
Mexico (Monitor Latino)	9
Mexico Pop (Monitor Latino)	1

=== Year-end charts ===
Year-end chart performance for "Primaveral"
Chart (2018)	Position
Mexico Pop (Monitor Latino)	69
