= Antes de Ti =

2018 song by Mon Laferte

Single by Mon Laferte
- Language: Spanish
- B-side: "Antes de Ti" (Japanese version)
- Released: 2 February 2018
- Recorded: 2018
- Genre: Latin ballad
- Length: 4:02
- Label: Universal Music Group
- Songwriters: Mon Laferte; Manuel Soto
- Producers: Mon Laferte; Manuel Soto

Mon Laferte singles chronology
"No Te Fumes Mi Mariguana" (2018)	"Antes de Ti" (2018)	"Invéntame" (2018)

Music video
- "Antes de Ti" on YouTube

"Antes de Ti" is a song by Chilean Mexican singer-songwriter Mon Laferte released on 2 February 2018 through Universal Music Group as a non-album single. The song was written and produced by Laferte and Manuel Soto. A Japanese version of "Antes de Ti" was released on 4 May 2018 and both versions were released in vinyl format on 23 May 2018. It received a Latin Grammy nomination for Song of the Year.

== Background ==
The song was written and produced by Mon Laferte and Manú Jalil. The song was born during the Amárrame Tour in Chile, during 2017, as a product of an improvisation between the two authors. Laferte took as inspiration for the song the 1973 Japanese film Lady Snowblood. The film tells the story of a hero who seeks her destiny. Laferte explains: "Suddenly a melody like a soundtrack, very cinematic, with violins came to my mind... And the song has a lot of that, of movie music. I visualized it like this". "Antes de Ti" was also inspired by Juan Gabriel, Cecilia and Raphael; Laferte said: "If you ask me personally, I think it is a rather personal search to need someone by your side to be happy, and it's something that I understood many years ago, but I still like this romantic idea of saying 'I was sad until I met you'. Juan Gabriel said it the other way around in his song ‘I was happy until I met you’, I love that emotional blackmail which is beautiful, which is an exaggeration to”.

The song was presented live in the concerts at the Teatro Caupolicán, of the aforementioned Amárrame Tour on 20 June and 21 July 2017, along with another unpublished song "Cuenda Era Flor", the latter being included in the deluxe version of the album La Trenza.

Although «Antes de Ti» was not included in the album La Trenza, only being released as a non-album single, the artist considered its release as the last track of this album.

In May 2018, she published a Japanese version of the song, which comes with a video with the letters in Japanese alphabet and hepburn, fulfilling one of her dreams of singing in that language.

== Music video ==
The music video for "Antes de Ti" was published on 1 February 2019, and was directed by Laferte with Catina Alfredo Altamirano as director of photography. The clip features Japanese aesthetics. As January 2020, the music video has over 100 million views on YouTube.

== Track listing ==
All tracks are written by Mon Laferte and Manuel Soto.

7" single B0028044-01, Japanese version
No.	Title	Length
1.	"Antes de Ti"	4:02
2.	"Antes de Ti" (Japanese version)	4:02
Total length:		8:04

Original version
No.	Title	Length
1.	"Antes de Ti"	4:02
Total length:		4:02

== Personnel ==
Credits adapted from "Antes de Ti" liner notes.

Vocals

- Mon Laferte – lead vocals

Musicians

- Manuel Soto – glockenspiel, xylophone
- Santiago Lara – guitar
- Angel Víquez – trumpet
- Néstor Varela – trombone
- José Huerta – saxophone
- Fermín Fortiz – bass guitar
- Vinicio Toledo – drums

Production

- Mon Laferte – production
- Manuel Soto – production, recording arrangements
- Eduardo del Águila – mixing, recording
- Alan Ortiz – recording

== Charts ==
=== Weekly charts ===
Weekly chart performance for "Antes de Ti"
Chart (2018)	Peak position
Mexico (Monitor Latino)	13
Mexico Airplay (Billboard)	30
Mexico Pop Español Airplay (Billboard)	9
Mexico Pop (Monitor Latino)	13

=== Year-end charts ===
Year-end chart performance for "Antes de Ti"
Chart (2018)	Position
Chile (Monitor Latino)	94
Chile Pop (Monitor Latino)	35
México Pop (Monitor Latino)	35

== Release history ==
Release history and formats for "Antes de Ti"
Region	Date	Format	Version	Label	Ref.
Various	2 February 2018	Digital download	Original	Universal Music Mexico	
Various	4 May 2018	Digital download	Japanese version; Original	Universal Music Mexico	
United States	23 May 2018	7"	Original; Japanese version	Universal Music Latin Entertainment	
