= Mirror (Lauren Spencer-Smith album) =

Studio album by Lauren Spencer Smith
- Released: July 14, 2023
- Genre: Pop
- Length: 44:06
- Labels: Three Name Productions; Island; Republic
- Producers: Nick Ruth; Geena Fontanella; David Burris; Jakke Erixson; Jason Evigan; Greg Kurstin; Hazey Eyes; OAK; Alex Niceforo; Keith Sorrells; Gordon Groothedde; Cian Ducrot; T.I Jakke; Christian Fiore; Ryan Marrone

Lauren Spencer Smith chronology
Mixed Emotions (2020)	Mirror (2023)	The Art of Being a Mess (2025)

Singles from Mirror
- 1. "Fingers Crossed" Released: January 15, 2022; 2. "Flowers" Released: April 14, 2022; 3. "Narcissist" Released: July 29, 2022; 4. "28" Released: February 8, 2023; 5. "Best Friend Breakup" Released: February 10, 2023; 6. "Fantasy" Released: April 14, 2023; 7. "That Part" Released: May 25, 2023

Mirror is the debut studio album by Canadian singer-songwriter Lauren Spencer Smith. The album was released on July 14, 2023 through Three Name Productions, Island Records and Republic Records. The album was inspired by the singer's breakup and described as "a story filled with autobiographical ups and downs".

== Critical reception ==
Mirror ratings
Review scores
Source	Rating
The Guardian	3/5 stars
Dork	3/5 stars

Michael Cragg of The Guardian rated the album 3 out of 5 stars, complementing Spencer-Smith's "big voice" and the album's "few frayed edges", but felt that the album "plays the emotional bloodletting a little too safe". Writing for Dork, Martin Young noted that the "run of ballads and sky scraping anthems including towering highlight 'That Part' [is] hugely impressive" but felt the album "could do with a little bit more dynamism to lighten the heavy atmosphere just a touch".

== Track listing ==
Mirror – Standard edition
No.	Title	Writer(s)	Producer(s)	Length
1.	"Never Been in Love"	Lauren Spencer-Smith; Geena Fontanella; Thomas Daniel Bracciale	Nick Ruth; Fontanella	3:07
2.	"Love Is an Overstatement"	Spencer-Smith; David Burris; Fontanella; Violet Skies	Burris; Fontanella	3:14
3.	"Fingers Crossed"	Spencer-Smith; Jake Erixson; Fransisca Hall	Erixson	2:55
4.	"Fantasy" (with Gayle and Em Beihold)	Spencer-Smith; Gayle; Em Beihold; Jason Evigan; Sean Douglas	Ruth; Evigan	2:55
5.	"Narcissist"	Spencer-Smith; Kyle Burns; Greg Kurstin; Hall	Kurstin	2:52
6.	"Bigger Person"	Spencer-Smith; Fontanella; Bracciale	Ruth; Fontanella	2:41
7.	"Aftermath"	Spencer-Smith; Erixson; Hall	Erixson	2:35
8.	"28"	Spencer-Smith; Fontanella; Thomas Michel	Hazey Eyes; Fontanella	2:44
9.	"Best Friend Breakup"	Spencer-Smith; OAK; Alex Niceforo; Keith Sorrells; Fontanella; Douglas; Daniel	OAK; Niceforo; Sorrells	2:21
10.	"Too Hurt to Fall in Love"	Spencer-Smith; Gordon Groothedde; Jacqueline Govaert	Groothedde	2:33
11.	"Hey"	Spencer-Smith; Cian Ducrot	Ducrot	3:03
12.	"Flowers"	Spencer-Smith; Ducrot	Ducrot	2:37
13.	"That Part"	Spencer-Smith; T.I Jakke; Fontanella; Jake Torrey	Ruth; Jakke	2:54
14.	"Ily"	Spencer-Smith; Fontanella	Fontanella; Christian Fiore	3:07
15.	"Do It All Again"	Spencer-Smith; Durcot; Fontanella	Durcot; Fontanella; Ryan Marrone	4:28
Total length:				44:06

Mirror – Digital deluxe edition
No.	Title	Writer(s)	Producer(s)	Length
1.	"Sad Forever"	Spencer-Smith; Jack Rochon; Amy Allen; Steph Jones	Rochon	2:56
Total length:				47:02

== Charts ==
Chart performance for Mirror
Chart (2023)	Peak position
Australian Albums (ARIA)	24
Belgian Albums (Ultratop Flanders)	42
Canadian Albums (Billboard)	45
Dutch Albums (Album Top 100)	16
Irish Albums (IRMA)	36
New Zealand Albums (RMNZ)	14
Norwegian Albums (VG-lista)	18
Scottish Albums (Official Charts)	37
UK Albums (Official Charts)	11
US Billboard 200	49

== Certifications ==
Certifications for Mirror
Region	Certification	Certified units/sales
Canada (Music Canada)	Gold	40,000^{‡}
Denmark (IFPI Danmark)	Gold	10,000^{‡}
New Zealand (RMNZ)	Gold	7,500^{‡}
United Kingdom (BPI)	Gold	100,000^{‡}
^{‡} Sales+streaming figures based on certification alone.

== Release history ==
Release dates and formats for Mirror
Region	Date	Format(s)	Edition	Label	Ref.
Various	July 14, 2023	CD; digital download; LP; streaming	Standard	Republic	
Various	October 13, 2023	Digital download; streaming	Deluxe	Republic	
