= La Trenza =

Studio album by Mon Laferte
- Released: 28 April 2017
- Recorded: 2016–2017
- Studio: Valenzo Studios, Estudio 13, Honky Tonk Studios (Mexico City); CHT Studios (Santiago)
- Genre: Indie pop; pop rock; Latin ballad; Latin pop
- Length: 40:36
- Language: Spanish
- Label: Universal Music México; Universal Music Perú
- Producer: Mon Laferte; Manú Jalil

Mon Laferte chronology
Mon Laferte, Vol. 1 (2015)	La Trenza (2017)	Norma (2018)

Alternative cover
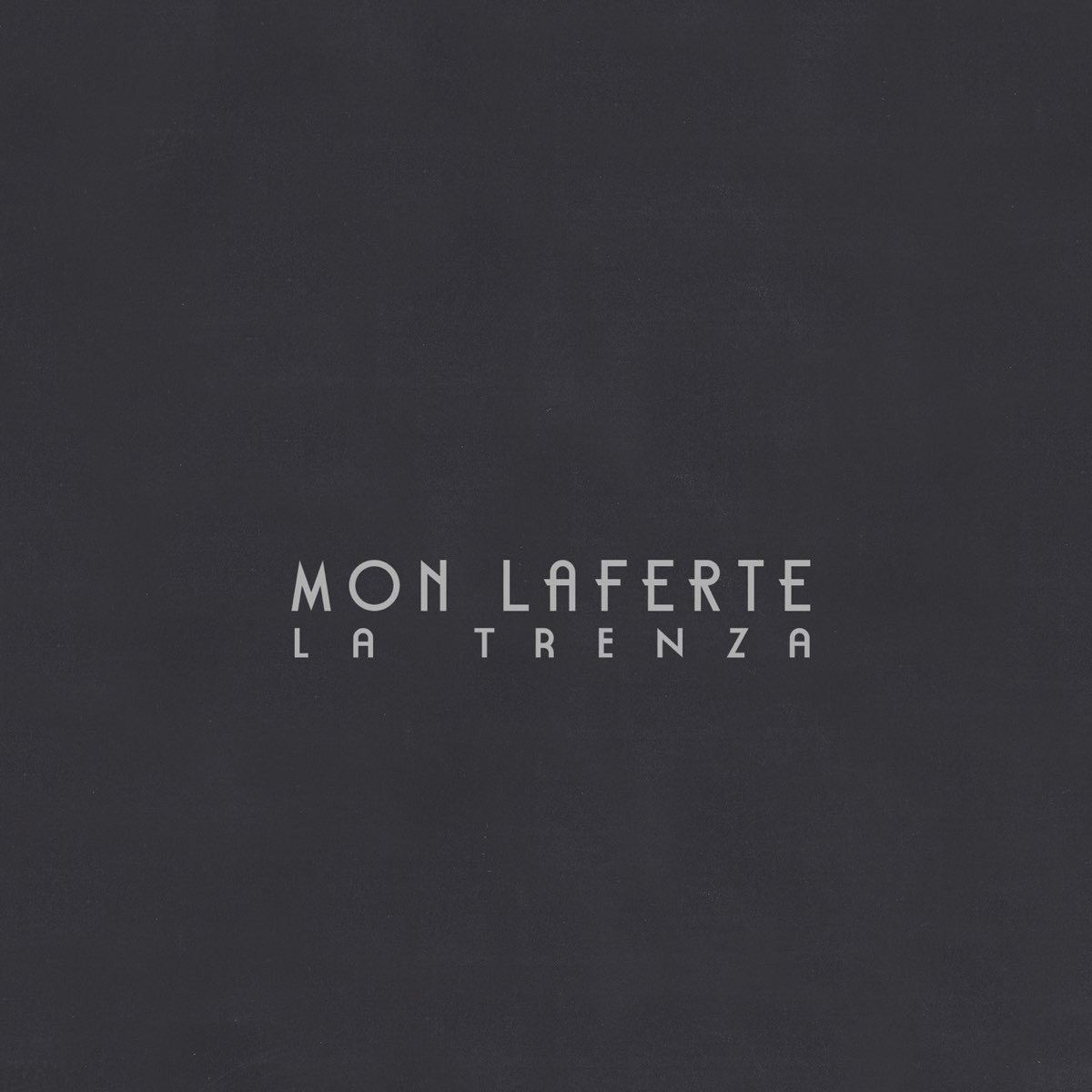
- Deluxe edition cover

Singles from La Trenza
- 1. "Amárrame" Released: 10 February 2017; 2. "Mi Buen Amor" Released: 8 August 2017; 3. "Primaveral" Released: 16 October 2017

La Trenza is the fifth studio album by Chilean Mexican singer-songwriter Mon Laferte, released on 28 April 2017, through Universal Music México. The album was produced by Laferte alongside Manú Jalil, and features collaborations with Enrique Bunbury, Juanes and Manuel García. A deluxe version of the album was released on 10 November 2017, with four new songs including a collaboration with Caloncho.

At the 18th Annual Latin Grammy Awards, the album was nominated for Album of the Year and Best Alternative Music Album while the album's lead single "Amárrame" received three nominations, Song of the Year, Record of the Year and Best Alternative Song, winning the later, this one being the Laferte's first Latin Grammy win. With five Latin Grammy nominations received in 2017, Laferte became the most nominated Chilean artist in one ceremony as well as the first Chilean artist to be nominated for Album of the Year as the main artist.

Commercially, La Trenza is Laferte's most successful album peaking at numbers twelve and four at the Top Latin Albums and Latin Pop Albums charts, respectively, being her first and highest appearances on both lists. It was also certified diamond in Mexico, platinum in both Chile and Peru, and gold in Colombia and Ecuador.

== Background ==
La Trenza followed the success Laferte achieved with her previous album Mon Laferte, Vol. 1 (2015), which allowed her to enter the Latin American scene, specially with the commercial success of "Tu Falta de Querer", unlike her previous effort, which was recorded independently, La Trenza was recorded at different studios in both Mexico (Valenzo Studios, Estudio 13 and Honky Town) and Chile (CHT Studios). After the release of the first single "Amárrame", Laferte announced the release of the album sharing its name and cover via her Instagram account in April 2017, as well as posting snippets of songs such as "Flaco", "Cielito de Abril" (previously featured in the 2014 film Loco cielo de abril), "No te Fumes mi Marihuana" and "Ana" (cover of a song by Peruvian band Los Saicos), among others. She also shared videos telling her inspirations for some of the songs of the album like "La Trenza", which according to her "it is literally the story of how my grandmother saw the life of her granddaughter, of me, how she dreamed this girl would be and I only wrote what I remembered my grandmother saying".

Sonically, the album features a wide variety of genres of Latin American music like mariachi in "La trenza", andean folklore in "Pa' Donde se Fue", bolero in "Flaco", cumbia in "Amárrame" and peruvian waltz in "Yo Te Qui". The album also includes collaborations with Colombian singer Juanes in "Amárrame", Spanish singer Enrique Bunbury in "Mi Buen Amor" and Chilean singer Manuel García in "Cielito de Abril". On November 10, 2017, she released a deluxe version of the album with four unreleased songs, "Alelí" featuring Mexican singer Caloncho, "Vendaval", "Palomita" and "Cuando era Flor", to accompany the deluxe version, she also released a DVD composed of live performances from the concerts she gave in Santiago during the promotion of the album.

== Promotion ==
=== Singles ===
The first single was "Amárrame" featuring Juanes, released on 10 February 2017. The song peaked at number two in both Chile and Mexico, and finished the year as the most played song by a Chilean artist in Chilean radio stations, being played over 37,000 times during 2017. A music video for the song was filmed in Miami, Florida and had over 360 million views in YouTube as of 2022.

The second single was "Mi Buen Amor" featuring Spanish singer Enrique Bunbury, released on 8 August 2017. The third single was "Primaveral", released on 16 October 2017, the music video for the song was filmed in Mexico and was directed by Gamaliel de Santiago, who also directed the videos for "Si Tú Me Quisieras", "Tu Falta de Querer" and "Amárrame". Both "Amárrame" and "Mi Buen Amor" were certified diamond in Mexico, with the former selling over 450,000 copies, additionally, four more songs from the album were also certified in the country, platinum for "Primaveral" and "Flaco", and gold for "Pa' Donde Se Fue" and "Yo Te Qui".

=== Touring and performances ===
Prior to the release of the album, Laferte performed at the 2017 Viña del Mar International Song Festival, including the songs "Amárrame", "No Te Fumes Mi Marihuana" and "Yo Te Qui" in the setlist, this was her first performance at the Chilean festival. During 2017, she embarked on the Amárrame Tour which started on February 11, 2017, at the Centro Cultural Universitario in Tlaxcala, Mexico and spanned through several cities of Mexico, United States, Spain and Peru, it also included eleven performances through various cities of Chile with two concerts at Teatro Caupolicán in Santiago.

== Critical reception ==
Professional ratings
Review scores
Source	Rating
AllMusic	4/5 stars
Indie Rocks!	8/10

La Trenza received positive reviews from critics upon release, being listed by several magazines as one of the best albums of both Chile and Latin American music of 2017. American magazine Billboard placed the album at number seven on their list of Top 20 Best Latin Albums of 2017 calling it "an album that announces the arrival of an artist with range and staying power" while Chilean media outlets La Tercera and Publimetro named the album as one of the most important Chilean releases of the year. Additionally, the title track was placed at number five by Billboard at their list for The 20 Best Latin Songs of 2017 writing that "with a feminist message for girls braided into an old school bolero, Mon Laferte makes a beautiful song all the more powerful".

Mariano Prunes from AllMusic gave the album four out of five stars, he said about her music that "she partially switches her attention from her adoptive homeland to the sounds she heard while growing up in Chile", also noticing Laferte "is more interested in offering something for everyone than heading in a completely new direction, as the album smartly mixes North Andean rhythms, vals peruano, cumbia, and a Los Saicos cover (a highly influential Peruvian band from the '60s), with bolero, ska, ranchera, pop, and ballads", and considered Laferte "a powerhouse melodramatic singer able to emote without sounding strident". Adriana Cartagena from Mexican magazine Indie Rocks! gave the album an eight out of ten writing that "La Trenza reveals a relaxed Laferte, with nothing to prove and with a bigger budget to add more instruments and better arrangements", she also mentioned the collaborations "Mi Buen Amor" and "Cielito de Abril" as being high points in the album.

=== Accolades ===
Accolades for La Trenza
Publication	Country	Accolade	Rank	Ref.
Billboard	United States	20 Best Latin Albums of 2017	7	

== Track listing ==
La Trenza track listing
No.	Title	Writer(s)	Length
1.	"Pa' Donde Se Fue"	Mon Laferte	4:09
2.	"Que Sí"	Laferte; Gamaliel de Santiago	3:23
3.	"Mi Buen Amor" (featuring Enrique Bunbury)	Laferte	3:47
4.	"Ana"	Rolando Carpio; Erwin Flores	2:45
5.	"Amárrame" (featuring Juanes)	Laferte	3:27
6.	"Yo Te Qui"	Laferte	2:46
7.	"Primaveral"	Laferte	3:51
8.	"No Te Fumes Mi Mariguana"	Laferte; Manú Jalil	4:30
9.	"Cielito de Abril" (featuring Manuel García)	Laferte; César Ceja	2:54
10.	"Flaco"	Laferte	4:16
11.	"La Trenza"	Laferte	3:48
Total length:			40:36

Deluxe edition bonus tracks
No.	Title	Writer(s)	Length
11.	"Alelí" (featuring Caloncho)	Laferte; César Ceja	3:12
12.	"Vendaval"	Laferte	3:34
13.	"Palomita"	Laferte	4:16
14.	"Cuando Era Flor"	Laferte	4:41
Total length:			56:19

== Charts ==
=== Weekly charts ===
Weekly chart performance for La Trenza
Chart (2017)	Peak position
Mexico (AMPROFON)	1
Spain (PROMUSICAE)	76
US Top Latin Albums (Billboard)	12
US Latin Pop Albums (Billboard)	4

=== Year-end charts ===
Year-end chart performance for La Trenza
Chart (2017)	Position
US (Billboard Top Latin Albums)	91

== Certifications ==
Certifications for La Trenza
Region	Certification	Certified units/sales
Chile (IFPI)	4× Platinum	40,000
Colombia (ASINCOL)	Gold	10,000
Ecuador (IFPI)	Gold	3,000
Mexico (AMPROFON)	Diamond+Gold	330,000^{‡}
Peru (UNIMPRO)	2× Platinum	12,000
^{‡} Sales+streaming figures based on certification alone.
