= Mi Buen Amor (Mon Laferte song) =

2017 song by Mon Laferte

Single by Mon Laferte featuring Enrique Bunbury

from the album La Trenza
- Language: Spanish
- Released: 8 August 2017
- Recorded: 2016
- Genre: Soft rock; Latin ballad; Latin pop
- Length: 3:47
- Label: Universal
- Songwriter: Mon Laferte
- Producers: Mon Laferte; Manuel Soto

Mon Laferte singles chronology
"Amárrame" (2017)	"Mi Buen Amor" (2017)	"Primaveral" (2017)

Music video
- "Mi Buen Amor" on YouTube

"Mi Buen Amor" is a song by Chilean Mexican singer-songwriter Mon Laferte featuring Spanish singer Enrique Bunbury. It was released on 8 August 2017 through Universal Music Group as part of Laferte's fifth studio album La Trenza. The song was written by Laferte, produced by herself and Manuel Soto.

== Background ==
The song originally created by Mon Laferte for band Los Ángeles Negros, but since they could not record it for reasons of time and given the work it had taken to create this song, Laferte decided to record it and had the collaboration of the Spanish singer Enrique Bunbury.

== Music video ==
The music video shows Laferte in shots of her Amárrame Tour, especially as she passes through South America, through Chile, Argentina, Peru and Colombia, and is dedicated to her fans, as expressed by the artist herself on her Facebook Live: "We were recording shots of this tour, especially from South America, we visited Colombia, we went to Chile, Peru, Argentina. And the most shots that appear in this video are from that tour, from South America, and for me it is very nice to be able to thank you for all the love you have given us, how you have received us in each place. That's why we wanted to make this video like that. It is a gift for you and a way to thank you for everything you have given us". As January 2020, the music video has over 289 million views on YouTube.

== Personnel ==
Credits adapted from La Trenza liner notes.

Vocals

- Mon Laferte – lead vocals
- Juanes – lead vocals
- Esván Lemus – background vocals
- Jerry Velásquez – background vocals
- René Mooi – background vocals

Musicians

- Fermín Fortiz – bass guitar
- Ram – clarinet
- Enrique Lara – guitar
- Juanes – guitar
- Manuel Soto – guitar, organ
- Juan Molina – percussion
- Felipe Sanabria – saxophone
- Erick Rodríguez – trombone
- Humberto Sanabria – trumpet

Production

- Manuel Soto – production
- Eduardo del Águila – mixing, recording
- Alan Ortiz – recording
- Chalo González – recording
- Dave Poler – recording

== Charts ==
=== Weekly charts ===
Weekly chart performance for "Mi Buen Amor"
Chart (2017)	Peak position
Mexico (Monitor Latino)	11
Mexico Pop (Monitor Latino)	2

=== Year-end charts ===
Year-end chart performance for "Mi Buen Amor"
Chart (2017)	Position
México (Monitor Latino)	49
México Pop (Monitor Latino)	12

== Certifications ==
Certifications for "Mi Buen Amor"
Region	Certification	Certified units/sales
Mexico (AMPROFON)	Diamond+Platinum	360,000^{‡}
^{‡} Sales+streaming figures based on certification alone.
