= Caroline Planté =

Canadian flamenco guitarist and composer (born 1975)

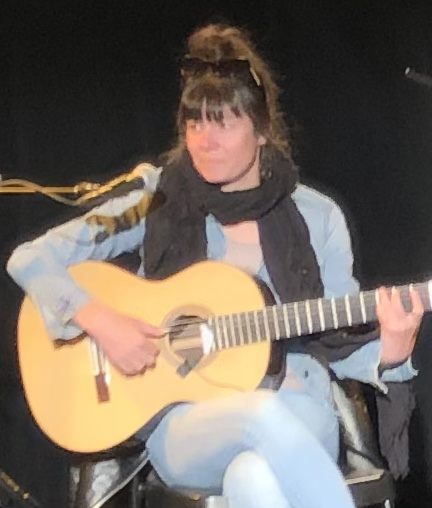
Caroline Planté

Caroline Planté (born in Montreal in 1975) is a Canadian flamenco guitarist and composer. Her 2010 flamenco album 8REFLEXIONES was the first to be composed and performed by a woman guitarist.

The daughter of Marcel Planté, also a flamenco guitarist, she was born in Montreal, Quebec. She studied flamenco guitar and piano there. With financial assistance from the Canada Council for the Arts and the Conseil des arts et des lettres du Québec, she was able to pursue further studies in Seville and Madrid.

Her album of flamenco music was chosen as one of the five best world music albums of 2010 by Le Devoir. Two of her compositions were used as the soundtrack for the short film Invernadero which received third prize at the Flamenco Short-Films Festival in Madrid. She was invited to perform as a soloist at the second Festival Sangre Nueva Jóvenes Flamencos held in Madrid. She has been director for the Festival Flamenco Montréal since 2010. She was included in Alicia Cifredo's documentary Tocaoras. In 2017, she received the Prix Accès Culture from the 30th edition of the Bourse Rideau.

Planté has been musical director for Madrid's Cruceta Flamenco company since 2005, composing and directing the music for their productions. She has collaborated with the La Otra Orilla dance company, the OktoEcho ensemble and the Esmeralda Enrique Spanish Dance Company of Toronto.
