= Lauren Spencer Smith =

Canadian singer-songwriter (born 2003)

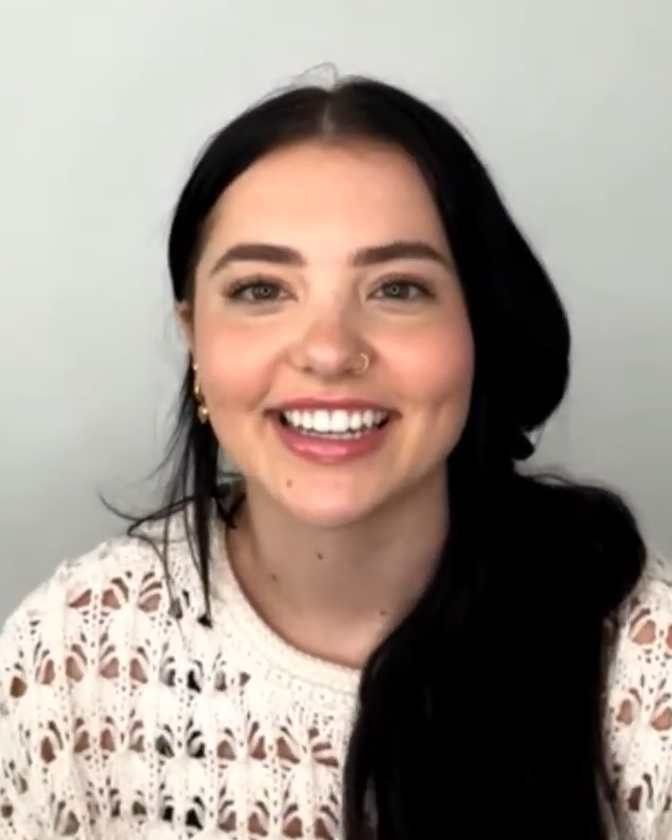
- Spencer-Smith in 2023

Background information
- Born: September 28, 2003 (age 23); Portsmouth, England
- Origin: Port Alberni, British Columbia, Canada
- Genre: Pop
- Occupation: Singer-songwriter
- Instruments: Vocals; guitar
- Years active: 2019–present
- Labels: Three Name; Island; Republic
- Website: laurenspencersmith.com

Lauren Spencer Smith (Note: Her last names, Spencer and Smith, are sometimes hyphenated as Spencer-Smith.) (born September 28, 2003) is a Canadian singer-songwriter from Port Alberni, British Columbia. Her 2019 live album Unplugged, Vol. 1 was a Juno Award nominee for Adult Contemporary Album of the Year at the Juno Awards of 2020, but lost to Shine a Light by Bryan Adams. She then appeared as a contestant on the eighteenth season of American Idol in 2020, placing in the top 20 in the competition.

In 2022, Spencer-Smith became more known internationally when her self-released song "Fingers Crossed" reached the top 20 in numerous countries, including the US and making the top 10 of the charts in numerous countries including Australia, New Zealand and the UK. This was on the back of a demo of the song which had gone viral on TikTok. In this way, her rise to popularity and success on social media has sometimes been compared to that of American singer-songwriter Olivia Rodrigo. Spencer-Smith also released the single "Flowers" in the same year, which charted in several countries. Both songs ended up on her 2023 debut studio album, Mirror.

== Early and personal life ==
Spencer-Smith was born in Portsmouth, England, on September 28, 2003. She moved to Canada at the age of three with her British parents and older brother. She lived in Port Alberni, British Columbia for 10 years and had moved to Nanaimo by the time she was 15. She developed her passion for music around the time of her move to Canada; she said that she had been singing since she could talk. She first performed in front of her school at the age of six and started participating in competitions when she turned eight.

== Career ==
=== YouTube ===
Spencer-Smith joined YouTube in 2014 where she posted her contest audition, won and got a life changing opportunity to perform on stage with Keith Urban. After this, she knew she'd sing forever and she started posting covers. In 2019, she made a cover of "Always Remember Us This Way" that caught Steve Harvey's attention who invited her to his show.

=== American Idol ===
In 2020, she competed in the eighteenth season of American Idol, where she was eliminated from the competition during the Top 20 round. Spencer-Smith performed from her father's home in Port Alberni with a view of Sproat Lake in her background. It was after this that her social media following grew.

Episode	Theme	Song Choice	Original Artist	Order #	Result
Audition	Auditioner's Choice	"What About Us"	Pink	N/A	Advanced
Audition	Auditioner's Choice	"Always Remember Us This Way"	Lady Gaga	N/A	Advanced
Hollywood Round, Round 1	Contestant's Choice	"Because of You"	Kelly Clarkson	N/A	Advanced
Hollywood Round, Round 2	Group Performance	"Set Fire to the Rain"	Adele	N/A	Advanced
Hollywood Round, Round 3	Contestant's Choice	"The Joke"	Brandi Carlile	N/A	Advanced
Showcase Round / Top 40	Contestant's Choice	"Respect"	Aretha Franklin	N/A	Advanced
Top 20	Contestant's Choice	"Mamma Knows Best"	Jessie J	10	Eliminated

=== Post-Idol ===
Spencer-Smith went viral on TikTok in January 2022, when she released her first single, "Fingers Crossed", which received over 30 million views before it was released, and 10 to 15 million streams within 12 hours of its release. She followed it up in April with her song "Flowers". Spencer-Smith chose contrasting titles. "Flowers"' title was a trauma response she had after transitioning to a healthy relationship where her then boyfriend bought her flowers randomly whereas she was used to receiving them as an apology. She told People magazine that "Flowers" was one of her favourite songs to write. The album, Mirror, contains 15 tracks.

== Discography ==
=== Studio albums ===
List of studio albums, with selected details and chart positions
Title	Details	Peak chart positions						Certifications
Title	Details	CAN	AUS	IRE	NZ	UK	US	Certifications
Mirror	Released: July 14, 2023; Label: Three Name Productions, Island, Republic; Formats: CD, LP, digital download, streaming	45	24	36	14	11	49	MC: Gold; BPI: Gold; RMNZ: Gold
The Art of Being a Mess	Released: June 27, 2025; Label: Three Name Productions, Island, Republic; Formats: CD, LP, digital download, streaming	—	95	—	—	— (Note: "The Art of Being a Mess" did not enter the UK Albums Chart, but peaked at number 49 on the UK Albums Sales Chart.)	—	
"—" denotes a recording that did not chart or was not released in that territory.

=== Live albums ===
- Unplugged, Vol. 1 (2019)
- Unplugged, Vol. 2 (2019)

=== Extended play ===
- Mixed Emotions (2020)

=== Singles ===
List of singles, with selected details
Title	Year	Peak chart positions										Certifications	Album
Title	Year	CAN	AUS	DEN	IRE	NOR	NZ	SWE	UK	US	WW	Certifications	Album
"Always Remember Us This Way"	2019	—	—	—	—	—	—	—	—	—	—		Non-album singles
"Someone You Loved"	2019	—	—	—	—	—	—	—	—	—	—		Non-album singles
"Crazy"	2020	—	—	—	—	—	—	—	—	—	—		Mixed Emotions
"Back to Friends"	2021	—	—	—	96	—	—	—	— (Note: "Back to Friends" did not enter the UK Singles Chart, but peaked at number 11 on the UK Independent Singles Breakers Chart.)	—	—		Non-album singles
"For Granted"	2021	—	—	—	—	—	—	—	—	—	—		Non-album singles
"Fingers Crossed"	2022	8	8	4	1	1	3	18	4	19	13	MC: 3× Platinum; ARIA: 2× Platinum; BPI: Platinum; IFPI DEN: Platinum; RIAA: 2× Platinum; RMNZ: 2× Platinum	Mirror
"Flowers"	2022	17	26	38	13	11	27	48	17	55	37	MC: Platinum; ARIA: Platinum; BPI: Platinum; IFPI DEN: Gold; RIAA: 2× Platinum; RMNZ: Platinum	Mirror
"Narcissist"	2022	98	—	—	71	—	— (Note: "Narcissist" did not enter the NZ Top 40 Singles Chart, but peaked at number 16 on the NZ Hot Singles Chart.)	—	54	—	—	MC: Gold; ARIA: Gold; BPI: Silver; RIAA: Gold	Mirror
"Single on the 25th"	2022	—	—	—	—	—	—	—	—	—	—		Non-album singles
"Last Christmas"	2022	—	—	—	—	—	—	—	70	72	—		Non-album singles
"28"	2023	—	—	—	—	—	—	—	—	—	—		Mirror
"Best Friend Breakup"	2023	—	—	—	—	—	— (Note: "Best Friend Breakup" did not enter the NZ Top 40 Singles Chart, but peaked at number 34 on the NZ Hot Singles Chart.)	—	—	—	—		Mirror
"Fantasy" (with Gayle and Em Beihold)	2023	—	—	—	—	—	— (Note: "Fantasy" did not enter the NZ Top 40 Singles Chart, but peaked at number 12 on the NZ Hot Singles Chart.)	—	—	—	—		Mirror
"That Part"	2023	—	—	—	86	—	— (Note: "That Part" did not enter the NZ Top 40 Singles Chart, but peaked at number seven on the NZ Hot Singles Chart.)	—	— (Note: "That Part" did not enter the UK Singles Chart, but peaked at number 73 on the UK Singles Sales Chart.)	—	—	MC: Gold; ARIA: Gold; BPI: Silver; RIAA: Gold	Mirror
"Small"	2024	—	—	—	—	—	— (Note: "Small" did not enter the NZ Top 40 Singles Chart, but peaked at number 31 on the NZ Hot Singles Chart.)	—	—	—	—		Non-album single
"Pray"	2025	—	—	—	—	—	— (Note: "Pray" did not enter the NZ Top 40 Singles Chart, but peaked at number 18 on the NZ Hot Singles Chart.)	—	— (Note: "Pray" did not enter the UK Singles Chart, but peaked at number 40 on the UK Singles Sales Chart.)	—	—		The Art of Being a Mess
"If Karma Doesn't Get You (I Will)"	2025	—	—	—	—	—	— (Note: "If Karma Doesn't Get You (I Will)" did not enter the Official New Zealand Music Chart, but peaked at number 15 on the New Zealand Hot Singles chart.)	—	— (Note: "If Karma Doesn't Get You (I Will)" did not enter the UK Singles Chart, but peaked at number 51 on the UK Singles Sales Chart.)	—	—		The Art of Being a Mess
"Bridesmaid"	2025	—	—	—	—	—	—	—	—	—	—		The Art of Being a Mess
"Friends Don't" (with Alexander Stewart)	2025	—	—	—	—	—	—	—	—	—	—		What If?
"Last First Christmas"	2025	—	—	—	—	—	— (Note: "Last First Christmas" did not enter the NZ Top 40 Singles Chart, but peaked at number 19 on the NZ Hot Singles Chart.)	—	—	—	—		Non-album single
"Natural Disaster"	2026	—	—	—	—	—	—	—	—	—	—		TBA
"Stay"	2026	—	—	—	—	—	—	—	—	—	—		TBA
"Birthdays and Christmas"	2026	—	—	—	—	—	—	—	—	—	—		TBA
"—" denotes a recording that did not chart or was not released in that territory.

=== Other charted songs ===
List of other charted songs, with selected details
Title	Year	Peak chart positions		Certifications	Album
Title	Year	NZ Hot	UK	Certifications	Album
"Bigger Person"	2023	11	92	ARIA: Gold	Mirror

== Tour ==
=== Mirror Tour ===
Date	City	Country	Venue
North America
July 19, 2023	Boston	United States	Paradise Rock Club
July 21, 2023	Philadelphia	United States	Theatre of Living Arts
July 22, 2023	Silver Spring	United States	The Fillmore Silver Spring
July 25, 2023	New York City	United States	Irving Plaza
July 26, 2023	New York City	United States	Irving Plaza
July 28, 2023	Atlanta	United States	Buckhead Theatre
July 29, 2023	Lake Buena Vista	United States	House of Blues Orlando
July 31, 2023	Austin	United States	Emo's
August 2, 2023	Dallas	United States	House of Blues Dallas
August 4, 2023	Phoenix	United States	Crescent Ballroom
August 5, 2023	San Diego	United States	Observatory North Park
August 8, 2023	Los Angeles	United States	The Fonda Theatre
August 11, 2023	Santa Ana	United States	Observatory
August 12, 2023	San Francisco	United States	August Hall
August 14, 2023	Portland	United States	Crystal Ballroom
August 15 2023	Seattle	United States	The Showbox
August 17, 2023	Vancouver	Canada	Queen Elizabeth Theatre
Europe
September 6, 2023	Vienna	Austria	Flex
September 7, 2023	Warsaw	Poland	Palladium
September 10, 2023	Hamburg	Germany	Docks
September 13, 2023	Copenhagen	Denmark	Vega
September 14, 2023	Stockholm	Sweden	Nalen
September 17, 2023	Amsterdam	Netherlands	Melkweg
September 18, 2023	Amsterdam	Netherlands	Melkweg
September 20, 2023	Cologne	Germany	Die Kantine
September 21, 2023	Brussels	Belgium	Ancienne Belgique
September 23, 2023	Bern	Switzerland	Bierhübeli
September 24, 2023	Milan	Italy	Gate
September 26, 2023	Paris	France	Le Trabendo
September 28, 2023	Manchester	England	O2 Ritz
September 29, 2023	Leeds	England	Leeds Beckett Students Union
October 1, 2023	Glasgow	Scotland	SWG3 Galvanisers
October 2, 2023	Birmingham	England	O2 Institute
October 4, 2023	Dublin	Ireland	The Academy
October 5, 2023	Dublin	Ireland	The Academy
October 7, 2023	Bristol	England	SWX
October 9, 2023	London	England	O2 Forum Kentish Town
October 10, 2023	London	England	O2 Forum Kentish Town
Oceania
October 27, 2023	Melbourne	Australia	Palais Theatre
October 29, 2023	Sydney	Australia	Enmore Theatre
November 1, 2023	Brisbane	Australia	The Tivoli
November 4, 2023	Auckland	New Zealand	The Powerstation

=== The Art of Being a Mess world tour ===
Date	City	Country	Venue
Europe
September 3, 2025	Madrid	Spain	Sala La Riviera
September 4, 2025	Barcelona	Spain	Razmatazz
September 6, 2025	Brussels	Belgium	Ancienne Belgique
September 7, 2025	Brussels	Belgium	Ancienne Belgique
September 9, 2025	Amsterdam	Netherlands	AFAS Live
September 10, 2025	Hamburg	Germany	Inselpark Arena
September 12, 2025	Stockholm	Sweden	Fållan
September 13, 2025	Copenhagen	Denmark	KB Hallen
September 14, 2025	Oslo	Norway	Sentrum Scene
September 17, 2025	Berlin	Germany	Columbiahalle
September 19, 2025	Prague	Czechia	SaSaZu
September 20, 2025	Vienna	Austria	Gasometer
September 22, 2025	Munich	Germany	Tonhalle
September 23, 2025	Zürich	Switzerland	X-Tra
September 25, 2025	Oberhausen	Germany	Turbinenhalle 1
September 26, 2025	Paris	France	Bataclan
September 29, 2023	Dublin	Ireland	National Stadium
September 30, 2025	Belfast	United Kingdom	Ulster Hall
October 2, 2025	London	United Kingdom	Eventim Apollo
October 3, 2025	Liverpool	United Kingdom	Olympia
October 5, 2025	Glasgow	United Kingdom	O2 Academy
October 6, 2025	Glasgow	United Kingdom	O2 Academy
October 8, 2025	Manchester	United Kingdom	Victoria Warehouse
October 9, 2025	Leeds	United Kingdom	O2 Academy
October 10, 2025	Newcastle upon Tyne	United Kingdom	O2 City Hall
October 12, 2025	Birmingham	United Kingdom	O2 Academy
October 13, 2025	Bristol	United Kingdom	Beacon
Oceania
October 28, 2025	Wollongong	Australia	Anita's Theatre
October 31, 2025	Brisbane	Australia	Fortitude Music Hall
November 2, 2025	Auckland	New Zealand	Town Hall
November 4, 2025	Sydney	Australia	Hordern Pavilion
November 6, 2025	Fortitude Valley	Australia	The Fortitude Music Hall
November 7, 2025	Melbourne	Australia	Festival Hall
November 8, 2025	Adelaide	Australia	Hindley Street Music Hall
November 10, 2025	Perth	Australia	Astor Theatre
November 11, 2025	Perth	Australia	Astor Theatre
North America
February 4, 2026	Nashville	United States	Ryman Auditorium
February 6, 2026	Dallas	United States	South Side Ballroom
February 7, 2026	Austin	United States	ACL Live, Moody Theatre
February 9, 2026	Houston	United States	House of Blues
February 10, 2026	New Orleans	United States	The Fillmore
February 12, 2026	Orlando	United States	House of Blues
February 13, 2026	Atlanta	United States	The Tabernacle
February 14, 2026	Charlotte	United States	The Fillmore
February 17, 2026	Silver Spring	United States	The Fillmore
February 18, 2026	Philadelphia	United States	The Fillmore
February 20, 2026	New York City	United States	Brooklyn Paramount
February 21, 2026	Boston	United States	House of Blues
February 22, 2026	Ottawa	Canada	Bronson Centre
February 24, 2026	Montreal	Canada	MTELUS
February 25, 2026	Toronto	Canada	History
February 26, 2026	Toronto	Canada	History
February 28, 2026	Detroit	United States	The Fillmore
March 2, 2026	Indianapolis	United States	Egyptian Room @ Old National Centre
March 3, 2026	Chicago	United States	Byline Bank Aragon Ballroom
March 4, 2026	Madison	United States	The Sylvee
March 6, 2026	Kansas City	United States	Uptown Theatre
March 7, 2026	Minneapolis	United States	The Fillmore
March 10, 2026	Denver	United States	The Fillmore
March 11, 2026	Salt Lake City	United States	The Union
March 13, 2026	Phoenix	United States	The Van Buren
March 14, 2026	Anaheim	United States	House of Blues
March 17, 2026	Los Angeles	United States	The Wiltern
March 18, 2026	San Francisco	United States	The Masonic
March 19 2026	Sacramento	United States	Ace of Spades
March 21, 2026	Portland	United States	Roseland Theatre
March 22, 2026	Vancouver	Canada	The Orpheum
March 23, 2026	Seattle	United States	The Moore Theatre
