= La Argentinita =

Spanish-Argentine flamenco dancer and singer (1898–1945)

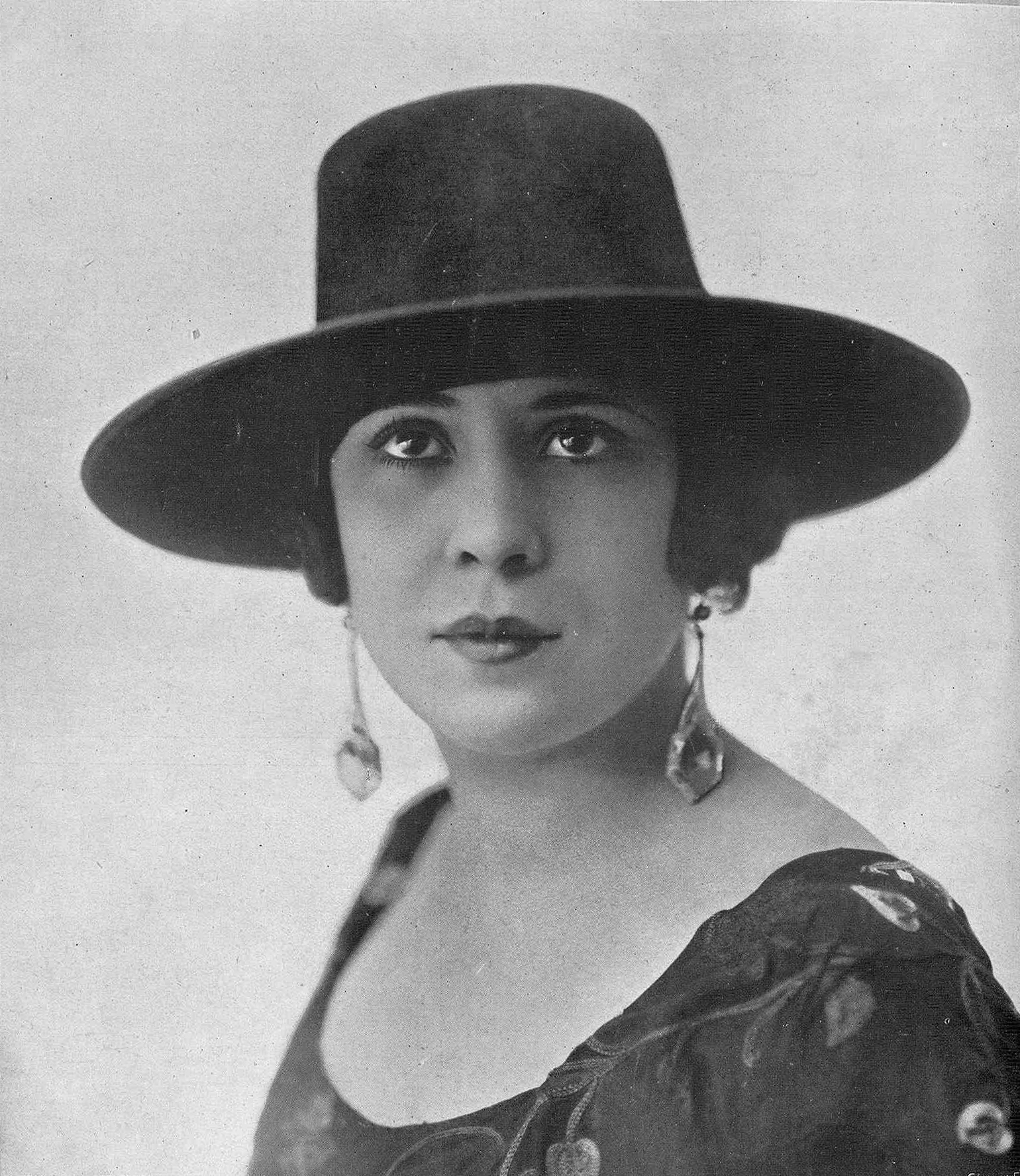
- La Argentinita in 1926
- Born: Encarnación López Júlvez; 3 March 1898; Buenos Aires, Argentina
- Died: 24 September 1945 (aged 47); New York City, U.S.
- Resting place: Madrid
- Occupations: Flamenco singer; Flamenco dancer; Choreographer
- Partner: Ignacio Sánchez Mejías (1927–1934)
- Musical career
- Genre: Flamenco
- Instruments: Vocals; castanets; taconeo

Encarnación López Júlvez (March 3, 1898 – September 24, 1945), better known by her stage name, La Argentinita, was a Spanish-Argentine flamenco dancer, choreographer and singer. La Argentinita was considered one of the highest expressions of this art form during her time.

== Life ==
Encarnación López Júlvez was born on March 3, 1898, in Buenos Aires, Argentina. López Júlvez was the daughter of Spanish immigrants in Argentina, where her father had a fabric business. While living there, two of her siblings died in a scarlet fever epidemic. Consequently, she was brought to the north coast of Spain in 1901, where she began to learn Spanish regional dances.

When she was only four years old, she started learning flamenco from Julia Castelao. Her first public performance was at the age of eight at the Teatro-Circo de San Sebastián, in the Basque Country. She chose the name "La Argentinita" in deference to the famous flamenco dancer Antonia Mercé (La Argentina).

After travelling throughout Spain as a child prodigy, she settled in Madrid to perform at Teatro La Latina, Teatro de la Comedia, Teatro de La Princesa, Teatro Apolo and Teatro Príncipe Alfonso. Her success led her to tour in Barcelona, Portugal and Paris, and then Latin America. In the early 1920s, she returned to Spain, where she worked in Madrid. Among her early performances was the 1920 premiere of Federico García Lorca's musical play El maleficio de la mariposa as "the Butterfly". She announced her retirement in 1926, but would quickly return to the show business as part of the artistic renewal that led her to the Generation of ‘27, in which she combined flamenco, tango, bulerías and boleros. She danced to the compositions of Manuel de Falla, Joaquín Turina, Isaac Albéniz, Enrique Granados and Maurice Ravel. She helped in the development of Ballet Español.

Adapting pieces to popular tradition, she toured Europe, triumphing in Paris and Berlin and participating in the artistic movements of that time along with Spanish poets such as Rafael Alberti, Federico García Lorca, Edgar Neville and Ignacio Sánchez Mejías. Sánchez Mejías, an intellectual and bullfighter, was a married man and her lover. La Argentinita retired a second time to maintain her clandestine relationship with him. However, she would return to the stage with the aid of Sánchez Mejías, who participated in the search and employment of interpreters for her subsequent performances.

In 1931, López Júlvez and García Lorca recorded five gramophone slate records, which were accompanied by García Lorca's piano. The selection of songs was prepared, adapted and titled Colección de Canciones Populares Españolas by García Lorca. Among the ten songs were "Los cuatro muleros", "Zorongo gitano", "Anda Jaleo" and "En el Café de Chinitas".

With the beginning of the Second Spanish Republic, López Júlvez formed her own ballet company called Bailes Españoles de la Argentinita together with her sister, Pilar López Júlvez, and García Lorca. López Júlvez staged several flamenco theatrical shows, including an adaption of Falla's El amor brujo (Love, the Magician) in 1933, and Las Calles de Cádiz (lit. 'the streets of Cádiz') in 1933 and 1940. She travelled through Spain and Paris, where she was recognized as one of the most important flamenco artists of her time. Her company included the flamenco figures Juana la Macarrona, La Malena, Fernanda Antúnez, Rafael Ortega and Antonio de Triana, who was her first dancing partner until the 1940s.

At the end of her tour around Spain, her lover Sánchez Mejías was gored to death in 1934 in the Manzanares bullring. She sought refuge in her work and moved to Buenos Aires to dance at the Teatro Colón; from there she embarked on a long American tour. In 1936 she achieved success in New York. Afterwards, she returned to Spain but was forced to flee the country shortly before the outbreak of the Spanish Civil War. She travelled through Morocco, France, the UK, the Netherlands, Belgium and the US, where she remained in exile in New York. From then until her death in 1945, she developed her career and became one of the biggest stars of international dance, and even participated in movies.

In 1943, she presented the flamenco troupe El Café de Chinitas at the Metropolitan Opera House in New York, with her own choreography, texts by García Lorca, scenery by Salvador Dalí and the orchestra directed by José Iturbi. In addition, she performed at the Washington DC Watergate complex with her sister.

On May 28, 1945, she gave her last performance at the Metropolitan of the orchestral work El Capricho Español, composed in 1887 by Nikolai Rimsky-Korsakov and based on Spanish melodies. At the end of the event, she had to be admitted to a hospital, where she died on September 24 from a tumor in her abdomen. She did not want to have it operated on because she did not wish to abandon dancing. Her body was repatriated to Spain in December and buried in the Spanish capital. That same year, the company of Bailes Españoles de la Argentinita was dissolved.

Among the honours she received after her death was a plaque consecrated at the Metropolitan Opera House, positioned among the medals of Alfonso X El Sabio and La Orden de Isabel la Católica to honour her merits in the field of culture.

== Discography ==
Encarnación López Júlvez was the composer of two works and participated in another 27 recordings.

=== Own works ===
- Duende y figura is a remastering released in Madrid in 1994 by Sonifolk.
- La Argentinita was released in Barcelona in 1958 by Compañía del Gramófono Odeón.

=== Participation in other works ===
- Consuelo la Alegría is a tango composed by Manuel Font de Anta that was released in Barcelona in 1929 by Compañía del Gramófono. La Argentinita plays the castanets with orchestral accompaniment.
- El gaucho was a play based on the dramatic song "Cancionera" composed by Osmán Pérez Freire and released in Barcelona in 1929 by Compañía del Gramófono. La Argentinita performs as part of the orchestral accompaniment.
- Colección de Canciones Populares Españolas is a set of old popular songs transcribed and harmonized by García Lorca in cooperation with La Argentinita. It was released in Barcelona in 1932 by Compañía Compañía del Gramófono. It consists of 12 tracks, including "Sevillanas del Siglo XVIII" and "En el Café de Chinitas".
- Goyescas is a play with a dance number composed by Enrique Granados and released in Barcelona in 1941 by Compañía del Gramófono Odeón. La Argentinita performs a castanet solo with orchestra accompaniment.
- El amor brujo is a play that belongs to the Colección de Danzas Clásicas y Españolas composed by Manuel de Falla in 1944. It was published in Madrid in 1996 by the publishing house Sonifolk. La Argentinita provides an orchestral accompaniment with castanets and tapping heels.

== Tributes ==
=== Portrait in the Julio Romero de Torres Museum ===
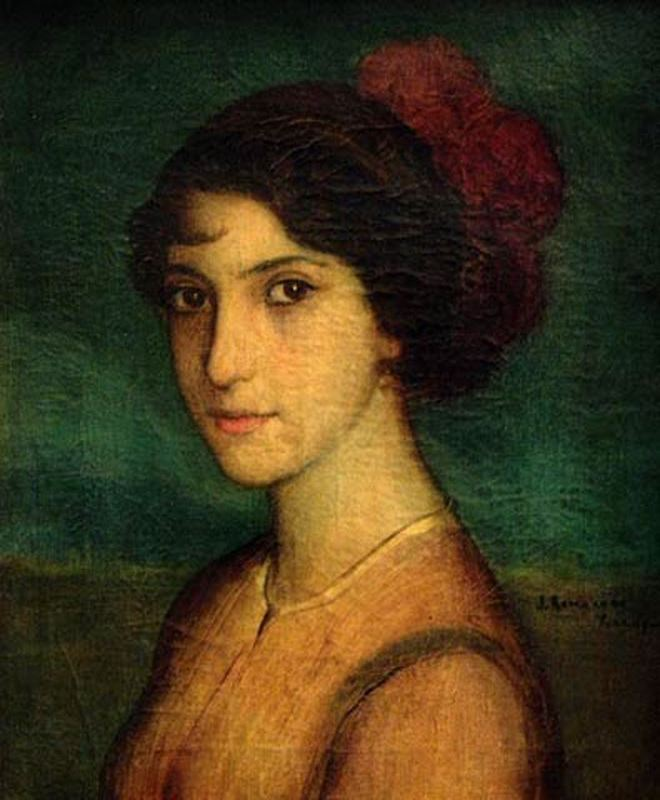
La Argentinita by Julio Romero de Torres

The Julio Romero de Torres Museum in Cordoba (Andalusia) has portrait of López Júlvez. The portrait, painted in 1915 by Julio Romero de Torres, was from a period in which his brushstroke and colour were influenced by the French Impressionist movement. The expression of La Argentinita is displaced to a second plane in order to highlight the relevance of colour, which is the focus of the painting.

=== Compañía de Bailes Españoles. Argentinita y Pilar López exhibition ===
A Segovian exhibition honoured Encarnación and Pilar López Júlvez. It was an initiative of their family, who for the first time displayed the artists' dresses for the public. This display consisted of 17 original costumes that the dancers wore in some of their most notable performances, including "La cosecha" by Enrique Granados and "El Café de Chinitas" by Federico García Lorca. It also included journalistic and artistic documentation, paintings, drawings and posters to promote the shows and contemporary portraits.

== See also ==
- Canciones españolas antiguas
