= Fingers Crossed (Lauren Spencer-Smith song) =

2022 single by Lauren Spencer-Smith

Single by Lauren Spencer-Smith

from the album Mirror
- Released: January 5, 2022
- Genre: Alt-pop
- Length: 2:55
- Label: Self-released
- Songwriters: Lauren Spencer-Smith; Fransisca Hall; Jakke Erixson
- Producer: Jakke Erixson

Lauren Spencer-Smith singles chronology
"For Granted" (2021)	"Fingers Crossed" (2022)	"Flowers" (2022)

Music video
- "Fingers Crossed" on YouTube

"Fingers Crossed" is a song by Canadian singer-songwriter Lauren Spencer-Smith, self-released as a single on January 5, 2022. It was written by Spencer-Smith, Fransisca Hall and Jakke Erixson, and produced by Erixson. The song went viral on TikTok and charted in various countries, reaching number one in Ireland and Norway.

== Background ==
Lauren Spencer-Smith is a Canadian singer-songwriter from Vancouver Island who competed on season 18 of American Idol in 2020, where she made it to the top 20 but was eliminated during the first week of remote shows. In November 2021, she posted a 47-second clip of herself to TikTok relaxing in the studio while listening to the demo of the song, which received more than 23 million views. Its success as well as comments from viewers helped convince her to release a studio version of the song.

== Composition ==
According to its digital sheet music, "Fingers Crossed" is written and composed in the key of F major, it is built of the chord progression F–Dm–Gm–C and is set in the time signature of 12/8 with a tempo of 109 beats per minute. Spencer-Smith's vocal range spans from F_{3} to C_{5}.

== Critical reception ==
Steve Holden of Newsbeat called it a "classic heartbreak anthem with lyrics about 'taking back the tears I've cried' and trying to fix an ex's 'daddy issues'". George Griffiths of the Official Charts Company described the track as a "gut-wrenching breakup track with hyper-specific lyrics", writing that it is "taken straight from the Taylor Swift songbook" and "diaristic in form".

== Charts ==
=== Weekly charts ===
Weekly chart performance for "Fingers Crossed"
Chart (2022)	Peak position
Australia (ARIA)	8
Austria (Ö3 Austria Top 40)	17
Belgium (Ultratop 50 Flanders)	5
Belgium (Ultratop 50 Wallonia)	8
Canada (Canadian Hot 100)	8
Canada AC (Billboard)	26
Canada CHR/Top 40 (Billboard)	10
Canada Hot AC (Billboard)	32
Croatia International (HRT)	51
Czech Republic Airplay (ČNS IFPI)	19
Denmark (Tracklisten)	4
Finland (Suomen virallinen lista)	16
Germany (GfK)	99
Global 200 (Billboard)	13
Greece International (IFPI)	34
Iceland (Tónlistinn)	4
Ireland (IRMA)	1
Lebanon (Lebanese Top 20)	4
Lithuania (AGATA)	41
Netherlands (Dutch Top 40)	10
Netherlands (Single Top 100)	8
New Zealand (Recorded Music NZ)	3
Norway (VG-lista)	1
Portugal (AFP)	66
South Africa Streaming (TOSAC)	51
Sweden (Sverigetopplistan)	18
Switzerland (Schweizer Hitparade)	24
UK Singles (Official Charts)	4
UK Indie (Official Charts)	1
US Billboard Hot 100	19
US Adult Contemporary (Billboard)	27
US Adult Pop Airplay (Billboard)	10
US Pop Airplay (Billboard)	10

=== Year-end charts ===
2022 year-end chart performance for "Fingers Crossed"
Chart (2022)	Position
Australia (ARIA)	63
Belgium (Ultratop 50 Flanders)	12
Belgium (Ultratop 50 Wallonia)	55
Canada (Canadian Hot 100)	53
Denmark (Tracklisten)	48
Global 200 (Billboard)	165
Netherlands (Dutch Top 40)	27
Netherlands (Single Top 100)	46
UK Singles (OCC)	61
US Billboard Hot 100	75
US Adult Top 40 (Billboard)	34
US Mainstream Top 40 (Billboard)	31

== Certifications ==
Certifications for "Fingers Crossed"
Region	Certification	Certified units/sales
Australia (ARIA)	2× Platinum	140,000^{‡}
Belgium (BRMA)	Gold	20,000^{‡}
Brazil (Pro-Música Brasil)	Gold	20,000^{‡}
Canada (Music Canada)	3× Platinum	240,000^{‡}
Denmark (IFPI Danmark)	Platinum	90,000^{‡}
Netherlands (NVPI)	Gold	40,000^{‡}
New Zealand (RMNZ)	2× Platinum	60,000^{‡}
United Kingdom (BPI)	Platinum	600,000^{‡}
United States (RIAA)	2× Platinum	2,000,000^{‡}
^{‡} Sales+streaming figures based on certification alone.

== Release history ==
Release history for "Fingers Crossed"
Region	Date	Format	Label	Ref.
Various	January 5, 2022	Digital download; streaming	Self-released	
United States	January 31, 2022	Adult contemporary radio	TuneCore	
