= Canciones españolas antiguas =

Canciones españolas antiguas ("Old Spanish Songs") is a collection of traditional Spanish folk songs arranged by the Spanish poet and playwright Federico García Lorca (1898–1936).

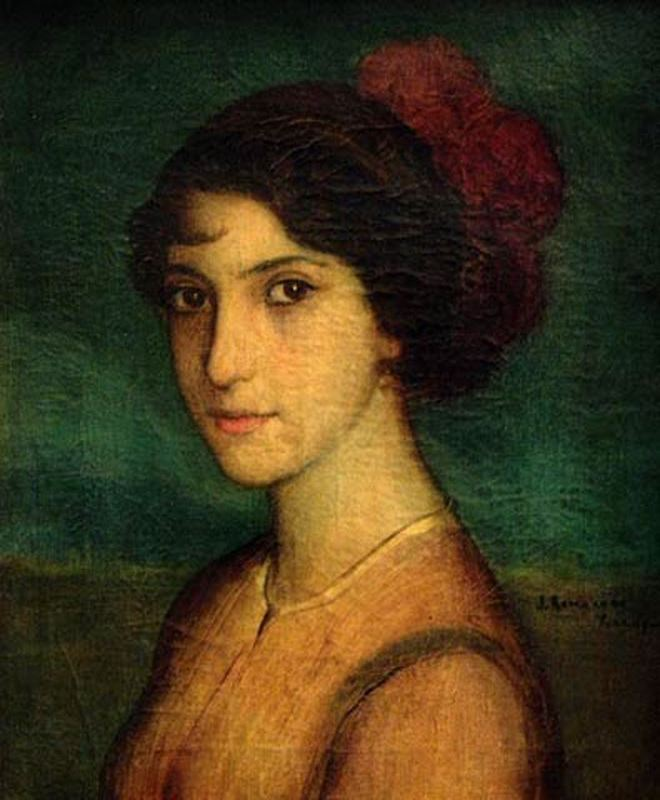
La Argentinita, painted by Julio Romero de Torres, 1915

A part of the songs was recorded in 1931 by the Spanish dancer and singer La Argentinita (Encarnación López Júlvez), with García Lorca accompanying her on the piano. The recordings were released on gramophone records. The songs are traditional Spanish folk songs from various regions. Lorca arranged and harmonized them, and provided piano accompaniments for the material.

== Background ==
Lorca had a longstanding interest in Spanish folk music, particularly the musical traditions of Andalusia. With Canciones españolas antiguas, he arranged and harmonized a selection of traditional songs from various regions of Spain, preserving their original melodies while providing piano accompaniments. The collection includes songs drawn from Andalusian and other regional Spanish traditions.

The critic Adolfo Salazar wrote about the recordings:

Cantadas por La Argentinita de un modo llano y natural, muy en el estilo de una mocita del pueblo, y acompañadas par García Lorca al piano de un modo curioso que hace de este instrumento el típico piano del salón familiar (…), la interpretación tiene una gracia especialísima. (……) Son deliciosas páginas de música inocente y candorosa que se dirigen a los limpios de corazón (…) (Adolfo Salazar, El Sol, March 13 1931)

Sung by La Argentinita in a plain and natural manner, very much in the style of a young girl from the village, and accompanied by García Lorca at the piano in a curious way that turns the instrument into the typical piano of the family salon (…), the performance has a most special charm. (…) They are delightful pages of innocent and artless music directed toward the pure of heart.

The songs became popular and a commercial success. La Argentinita incorporated them into her repertoire and regularly performed them at her concerts. Federico García Lorca included some of them in several of his plays. Together, they performed the songs in 1933 at a conference on Spanish folk poetry at the Teatro Español in Madrid. During the Spanish Civil War, Anda jaleo and Los cuatro muleres became popular songs among the Republican troops. After the war, some of the songs were partially suppressed under the Francoist regime.

In 1994, Audivis released a new recording of all ten songs, sung by Carmen Linares.

== Songs ==
The 13 songs (originally 12) included in the collection are (IMSLP):

1. Anda, jaleo
2. Los cuatro muleros
3. Las tres hojas
4. Los mozos de Monléon
5. Las morillas de Jaén
6. Sevillanas del siglo XVIII
7. El Café de Chinitas
8. Nana de Sevilla
9. Los pelegrinitos
10. Zorongo
11. Romance de Don Boyso
12. Los reyes de la baraja

== Legacy ==
The 1931 recordings by La Argentinita and Federico García Lorca are considered an important documentation of early 20th-century interpretations of Spanish traditional music. Several of the songs have since become part of the standard repertoire of Spanish classical and folk performers.

The Lorca Suite (2003) by José María Gallardo Del Rey f.e. is a tribute to the poet, incorporating new harmonisations and freely composed link passages that fuse classical and flamenco techniques.

== See also ==
- Siete canciones populares españolas (Manuel da Falla)
- Songs of the Spanish Civil War

== Bibliography ==
- José Luis Navarro García: Historia del Baile Flamenco. Vol. II. 2008
