= Manuel García (singer-songwriter) =

Chilean singer-songwriter (born 1970)

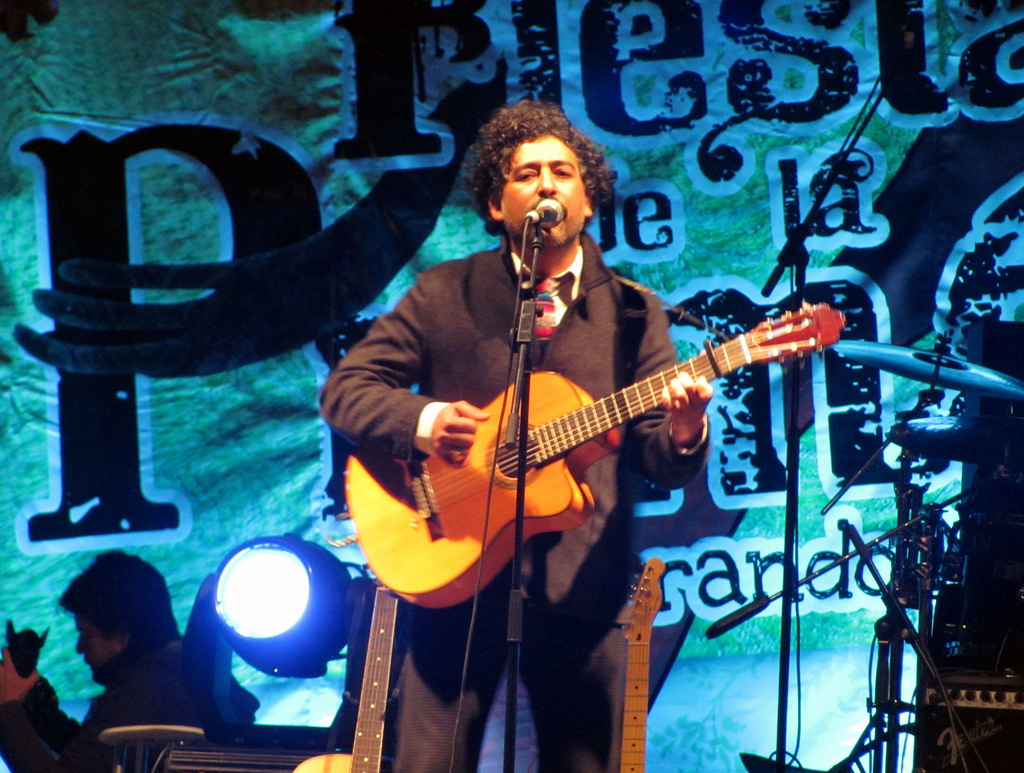

Background information
- Born: Manuel Javier García Herrera; March 1, 1970 (age 56)
- Origin: Arica, Chile
- Genres: Folk, trova, acoustic
- Years active: 1995–present
- Website: Web

Manuel Javier García Herrera (born 1 March 1970) is a folk-pop Chilean singer-songwriter and guitarist. He has won several awards and has twice received the Chilean National Music Prize, awarded by the Chilean Government (in 2008 and 2012).

== Early life ==
García studied History and Geography Education at the University of Tarapacá in Arica and then moved to Santiago in 1994 to study professional guitar performance ("interpretación superior en guitarra") at the Pontifical Catholic University of Chile with fellow musician Luis Orlandini. His professional career began in 1995 when he founded the band Coré (which also included later members of Chilean band Inti Illimani). However, he left Coré in 1997 and formed his new band Mecánica Popular with Diego Álvarez, Marco Chávez and fellow Coré member Mario Villalobos.

== Musical career ==
Mecánica Popular mixed rock and trova styles and were influenced by the "nueva canción chilena", trova, rock and even poetry. They released three studio albums between 1999 and 2003 and now, though formally disbanded, they often support Manuel García in his solo performances.

=== Solo ===
Since 2003, García has worked on several solo projects, one of the first of which was a documentary about the life of Argentinian musician Atahualpa Yupanqui (2003). The same year he was invited to open the festival Mercat de Música Viva de Vic in Barcelona, Spain.

In 2005, he released his first album, Pánico (Panic) in collaboration with two members of Mecánica Popular, Christian Bravo y Diego Álvarez. The album received good reviews in the national Chilean media

García's second solo album, Témpera, was released in 2008 with a sound closer to trova, and rock, with references to Violeta Parra and Atahualpa Yupanqui. His raw guitar sound recalls fellow Chilean musician Chinoy, with whom he has shared a stage on several occasions.

His third album was called S/T (2010). Its electric sound (including guitar solos) reveals a variety of influences, though it is considered a simpler album, free of the complex arrangements seen in the previous two.

His final record to date, Acuario, used electric sounds similar to Gepe or Javiera Mena. Acuario has been called a well-accomplished twist on García's signature style, without losing the heart that comes through in his lyrics.

Manuel Garcia is part of the line-up for the third edition of Lollapalooza Chile taking place in Santiago in April 2013.

== Discography ==
=== Studio albums ===
- 2005 – Pánico
- 2008 – Témpera
- 2010 – S/T (Altazor Awards winner).
- 2012 – Acuario
- 2014 – Retrato Iluminado
- 2016 – Harmony Lane

=== With Mario Rojas ===
- 1997 – Musi-cachi-lena

=== DVD ===
- 2011–En vivo (Live at the) Teatro Caupolicá

=== With Mecánica Popular ===
- 1999 – Mecánica Popular
- 2000 – La casa de Asterión (nominated for an Altazor Award)
- 2003 – Fata Morgana
- 2005 – En plena luz
- 2009 – Mecánica Popular en vivo

=== Other appearances ===
- 2008 – Víctor Jara sinfónico (with Concepción University Orchestra)
- 2008 – eXile (Festival Mercat de música Viva de Vic, Barcelona)
- 2010 – Música libre, Los Bunkers

=== Soundtracks ===
- 1998 – Fantasmas de fierro
- 2003 – Las condenadas

=== Documentary ===
- Roberto Parra
- La cueca brava de Nano Núñez, Mario Rojas documentary about Los Chileneros.
- La ciudad de los fotógrafos
- Catalejo
- Las horas del día
- El mar mi alma
