= Pilar López Júlvez =

Pilar López Júlvez (4 June 1912, San Sebastián – 25 March 2008, Madrid) was a Spanish choreographer and ballerina (bailaora). Encarnación López Júlvez (1898-1945), known as La Argentinita, was her older sister.

Pilar López was admired for her Ballet Español. She had become famous as a flamenco dancer, among her extensive performance credits: the 1933 flamenco-inspired staging of Falla's ballet El Amor Brujo, and the 1952 film Duende y misterio del flamenco. The 1933 choreography for Falla's ballet, according to Antonio de Triana, was "achieved through a mingling of ideas and improvisations" in which Pilar joined her sister and others its creation. The innovative film had no plot, but featured fourteen segments each focused on a flamenco cante or palo. Here Pilar López danced with Alejandro Vega, doing la caña.

After her sister's early death, Pilar formed her own flamenco dance company and mounted theatrical shows. She realized a continuing success. Many came to enjoy the well-crafted performances. Yet during this era of ópera flamenco such shows seemed to direct their attention to audiences unfamiliar with flamenco. Accordingly, this era was also critiqued by some aficionados whose claim was their savoring of the fine points of the art.

"Pilar's dancing is feminine and quietly moving". She also possessed a "talent for forming fine male dancers in her company". In the 1940s her dancers on tour included José Greco, before he formed his own company. Later she "strongly influenced the formation of... Antonio Gades" who, starting at age fifteen, toured with her troupe for eight years. In 1962 he was "appointed the first maestro and choreographer in the Scala of Milan". Acclaimed through "years of artistic success" Pilar and her husband Tomás Ríos, a musician and composer, resided in Madrid where they later retired.
