= Dignity (TV series) =

- Genre: Thriller; Crime; Drama
- Created by: María Elena Wood; Patricio Pereira
- Directed by: Julio Jorquera Arriagada
- Starring: Devid Striesow; Götz Otto; Marcel Rodriguez; Nils Rovira-Muñoz; Antonia Zegers; Jennifer Ulrich; Martina Klier; Julieta Figueroa
- Opening theme: "Kein schöner Land" by Manuel Oyanadel
- Composers: José Miguel Miranda; José Miguel Tobar
- Countries of origin: Chile; Germany
- Original languages: Spanish; German
- No. of seasons: 1
- No. of episodes: 8

Production
- Executive producers: María Elena Wood; Matías Cardone; Macarena Cardone; Patricio Pereira; Andrés Wood; Andreas Gutzeit; Jens Freels; Bo Stehmeier; Alex Fraser; Lisa Fidyka; Patricia Bazán; Jaime Sepúlveda; Steve Blank; Thomas Münzner
- Producers: Miggel Schwickerath; Jana Cisar
- Cinematography: Sergio Armstrong; Cristián Petit-Laurent
- Editors: Álvaro Solar; Valeria Valenzuela
- Running time: 50 minutes
- Production companies: Invercine & Wood; Story House Pictures

Original release
- Network: Mega (Chile); Joyn (Germany)
- Release: December 19, 2019 – January 9, 2020

Dignity is a Chilean-German thriller television series that first released on the German OTT streaming platform Joyn on December 19, 2019.

== Plot ==
At the center of the story is the young state's attorney Leo Ramírez, who lives in Santiago and leads the investigation against Paul Schäfer at the request of Judge Jiménez. The leader of the settlement of the German sect Colonia Dignidad, founded in Parral, is accused of obstruction of justice, kidnapping and child abuse.

The crime detective for sexual assault Pamela Rodríguez is the only one of few who supports Ramírez, since most of the residents of Parral, such as the criminal police chief Martínez, as well as political actors from Santiago, such as the Senator Ríos and the German ambassador Sattelberger, Schäfer's social support, such as the hospital, in which poor citizens of Parrals are treated free of charge or the boarding school, in which children from poorer families are given education, is highly recognized. Therefore, the investigation is difficult from several sides. This also includes Leo Ramírez's own life and family history.

For one, Leo Ramírez attended the boarding school with his brother Pedro and lived in the settlement. Schäfer also financed his law studies in Germany. On the other hand, he himself was sexually abused there, and his brother was killed or declared dead in the settlement in summer 1976. The dead turns out to be untrue. However, his wife Caro and crime detective Pamela Rodríguez initially don't know of Leo Ramírez's experiences in the settlement.

The investigation is also difficult because Schäfer is in hiding and the settlement doctor Bernard Hausmann and the assistant Schäfer's Ava cover him. Hausmann was arrested a short time later for falsifying documents and covering up a crime, but was get out shortly thereafter. Pamela Rodríguez made important evidence disappear as her family was threatened by Joel Carrillo, an assistant of Senator Ríos. Meanwhile, Anke Meier, the friend of Klaus alias Pedro Ramírez, tries to flee from the settlement.

The series takes place on two time domains: In the present, 1997, which deal with the investigation in Parral and Santiago, and in the past, 1976, which deal with the events at that time in the settlement.

== Cast and characters ==
=== Main characters ===
The actors who play a leading role are listed below, sorted according to the names of the actors in the opening credits. In addition, the child actors of the main roles were added after the adult actors.

Character	Year	Description	Actor	Episodes
Bernard Hausmann	1997, 1976	doctor in the settlement	Devid Striesow	1–8
Paul Schäfer	1997, 1976	sect leader	Götz Otto	1–8
Leonardo "Leo" Rafael Ramírez Soto	1997	state's attorney in Santiago	Marcel Rodiguez	1–8
Leonardo "Leo" Rafael Ramírez Soto	1976	settlement inhabitant	Ignacio Gómez (Note: Doesn't appear as a main actor, but acts as the child actor of the main character.)	1–4, 7–8
Klaus Becker alias Pedro Alberto Ramírez Soto	1997	settlement inhabitant who has fled	Nils Rovira-Muñoz	1–8
Klaus Becker alias Pedro Alberto Ramírez Soto	1976	settlement inhabitant, Pedro declared dead in summer 1976, after that named Klaus Becker	Lucas Morales	1–5, 8
Pamela Rodríguez	1997	crime detective for sexual assault in Parral	Antonia Zegers	1–8
Anke Meier	1997	nurse in the settlement	Jennifer Ulrich	1–8
Anke Meier	1976	settlement inhabitant	Mariana Coghlan	1–3, 5–6, 8
Caroline "Caro" Ramírez Scheck	1997	employee of the German embassy in Santiago, Wife of Leo Ramírez	Martina Klier	1–8
Ava	1997	assistant of Paul Schäfer	Julieta Figueroa	1–8
Ava	1976	settlement inhabitant	Maria Tapia	6

=== Recurring characters ===
In the following, actors are listed who play a recurring supporting role. Sorted by episode appearance.

Character	Year	Description	Actor	Episodes
Carmen Ramírez Soto	1997	sister of Leo Ramírez, lives in Parral	Paola Giannini (es)	1–8
Joel Carrillo	1997	employee of Senator Ríos	Felipe Ríos (es)	1–5
Mister Martínez	1997	criminal police chief in Parral	Daniel Antivillo	1–4, 7
Hannelore Harms	1997	employee of the German Embassy in Santiago	Amaya Forch	1–3, 5–7
Mister Jiménez	1997	judge in Santiago de Chile	Alejandro Trejo	1–2, 4–5, 8
Hartmut Sattelberger	1997	Head of the German Embassy in Santiago	Carlos Kaspar (es)	1–2, 5–8
Mister Ríos	1997	senator at National Congress of Chile	Hernán Vallejo	1–2
Ínes Hausmann	1997	nurse in the settlement, wife of Bernard Hausmann	Heidrun María Breier (es)	2–7
Manuel Contreras	1976	chief of Pinochet's Secret police	Sergio Piña	2–4
Mister Mertins	1976	friend of Sattelberger	Gerardo Ebert	2–4
Pablo Jenga	1997	Ex-husband of Pamela Rodríguez, head of a special unit	Iván Álvarez de Araya (es)	5–8
German Ambassador	1997	Ambassador of the German Embassy in Santiago	Stephan Behrend Blendowski (es)	6, 8

== Production ==
Created by María Elena Wood and Patricio Pereira, the series is written by Andreas Gutzeit, Swantje Oppermann, Paula del Fierro and Enrique Videla. Parts of the filming took place in the real Colonia Dignidad (now called Villa Baviera), including in Schäfer’s house.

== Release ==
Logos of the two series clients

Chilean Mega ...

...and German Joyn

The first excerpts of Dignity were published already at the television trade fair MIPCOM in Cannes on October 14, 2019. Several leading actors were also present.

The first release took place two months later on December 19, 2019 on the German OTT streaming platform Joyn. However, it is only available in the paid area Joyn Plus+. Two new episodes were released weekly.

In Chile, the eight-part series is broadcast on Mega from November 14, 2020 at 3:30 a.m. weekly. In Latin America including Chile Amazon Prime Video published all eight episodes at the same time on November 13, 2020.

== Episodes ==
On December 19, 2019, the first two episodes were released on Joyn in Germany. Two more episodes followed each week.

No.	Title	Directed by	Written by	Original release date
1	"Folge 1" "Episode 1"	Julio Jorquera Arriagada	Andreas Gutzeit (Headwriter), Swantje Oppermann, Paula del Fierro, Enrique Videla	December 19, 2019
2	"Folge 2" "Episode 2"	Julio Jorquera Arriagada	Andreas Gutzeit (Headwriter), Swantje Oppermann, Paula del Fierro, Enrique Videla	December 19, 2019
3	"Folge 3" "Episode 3"	Julio Jorquera Arriagada	Andreas Gutzeit (Headwriter), Swantje Oppermann, Paula del Fierro, Enrique Videla	December 26, 2019
4	"Folge 4" "Episode 4"	Julio Jorquera Arriagada	Andreas Gutzeit (Headwriter), Swantje Oppermann, Paula del Fierro, Enrique Videla	December 26, 2019
5	"Folge 5" "Episode 5"	Julio Jorquera Arriagada	Andreas Gutzeit (Headwriter), Swantje Oppermann, Paula del Fierro, Enrique Videla	January 2, 2020
6	"Folge 6" "Episode 6"	Julio Jorquera Arriagada	Andreas Gutzeit (Headwriter), Swantje Oppermann, Paula del Fierro, Enrique Videla	January 2, 2020
7	"Folge 7" "Episode 7"	Julio Jorquera Arriagada	Andreas Gutzeit (Headwriter), Swantje Oppermann, Paula del Fierro, Enrique Videla	January 9, 2020
8	"Folge 8" "Episode 8"	Julio Jorquera Arriagada	Andreas Gutzeit (Headwriter), Swantje Oppermann, Paula del Fierro, Enrique Videla	January 9, 2020

== International broadcast ==
- HBO Nordic (August 1, 2020)
  - Denmark, Finland, Norway, Sweden: Dignity
- HBO Portugal (August 1, 2020)
  - Portugal: Dignity
- HBO España (August 1, 2020)
  - Spain: Dignity
- HBO Go (August 14, 2020)
  - Bosnia and Herzegovina, Croatia, Montenegro, Serbia, Slovenia: Dostojanstvo
  - Bulgaria: Достойнство (romanized: Dostoynstvo)
  - Czech Republic, Slovakia: Kolonie Dignidad
  - Hungary: Méltóság
  - North Macedonia: Достоинство (romanized: Dostoinstvo)
  - Poland: Godność
  - Romania: Demnitate

== Awards and nominations ==
Year	Association	Category	Nominee(s)	Result	Ref.
2020	Canneseries	–	–	Nominated	
2021	Grimme-Preis	Fiktion (fiction)	–	Nominated	
