= Friedrich Vogel (politician) =

German politician (1929–2005)

- Friedrich Vogel in 1986

Minister of State to the Federal Chancellor
- In office 4 October 1982 – 12 March 1987
- Chancellor: Helmut Kohl

Minister of Justice of North Rhine-Westphalia
- In office 5 October 1966 – 8 December 1966
- Premier: Franz Meyers

Member of the Bundestag
- In office 1969–1994

Member of the Bundestag
- In office 1965 – 6 October 1966

Personal details
- Born: 2 June 1929 Hahnenknoop, Province of Hanover, Germany
- Died: 9 December 2005 (aged 76) Warendorf, North Rhine-Westphalia, Germany
- Party: Christian Democratic Union
- Children: 5
- Education: University of Münster
- Occupation: Judge, lawyer, notary, politician

Friedrich Vogel (2 June 1929 – 9 December 2005) was a German judge and politician of the Christian Democratic Union (CDU). He was a member of the Bundestag from 1965 to 1966 and from 1969 to 1994. He was Minister of Justice of North Rhine-Westphalia in 1966 and Minister of State to the Federal Chancellor from 1982 to 1987.

== Early life and education ==
Vogel was born in Hahnenknoop, then in the district of Wesermünde and now part of Loxstedt in Lower Saxony. His father was an estate manager and later the farm manager at Handorf airfield near Münster. At the end of the Second World War, aged 15, Vogel served with a Luftwaffe unit in Denmark.

He attended the Ratsgymnasium in Münster and, from 1945, the Gymnasium Laurentianum in Warendorf, where he completed his Abitur in 1949. From 1949 to 1952 he studied law and political science at the University of Münster. He passed the first state law examination in 1952 and the second in 1956.

== Legal career ==
Vogel became a judge in July 1956. In April 1960 he was appointed Landgerichtsrat at the regional court (Landgericht) in Münster. He was a member of the Deutscher Richterbund, the German association of judges. From 1977 he practised as a lawyer in Warendorf, and from 1980 also as a notary.

== Political career ==
Vogel joined the Junge Union in 1952 and the CDU in 1953. He was deputy federal chairman of the Junge Union from 1963 to 1967. He was a co-opted member of the federal board of the CDU/CSU association for local politics and deputy regional chairman of the party's Protestant Working Group (Evangelischer Arbeitskreis) in Westphalia-Lippe. He was deputy federal chairman of the Protestant Working Group from 1978 to 1993. From 1956 to 1972 he was a member of the Warendorf town council.

From 1970 to 1986 he chaired the Federal Working Group of Christian Democratic Lawyers (Bundesarbeitskreis Christlich-Demokratischer Juristen, BACDJ). During this period the group held legal policy congresses in Karlsruhe under the title Recht sichert die Freiheit ("Law secures freedom") in 1975, 1978, 1983 and 1986.

=== Minister of Justice of North Rhine-Westphalia ===
On 5 October 1966 Minister-President Franz Meyers appointed Vogel Minister of Justice of North Rhine-Westphalia. After the coalition between the CDU and the FDP ended, the FDP and the SPD elected Heinz Kühn Minister-President. Vogel left office on 8 December 1966.

=== Member of the Bundestag ===
Vogel was elected to the Bundestag in the 1965 federal election. He left parliament on 6 October 1966 on joining the state government of North Rhine-Westphalia. He was elected again in 1969 and remained a member until 1994. He entered the Bundestag each time through the CDU state list in North Rhine-Westphalia and stood as the party's candidate in the Ennepe-Ruhr-Kreis. Bundestag records list him as "Vogel (Ennepetal)".

From 1968 to 1969 he was a member of the commission under the Article 10 Act, which oversees restrictions on the privacy of correspondence and telecommunications. From 1971 to 1977 he chaired the CDU/CSU parliamentary group's working group on home affairs and legal policy.

From 1977 to 1982 he chaired the Mediation Committee of the Bundestag and Bundesrat. As chairman he signed the committee's notices to the President of the Bundestag, including those on an amendment to the law on public assemblies in September 1978 and on the Tax Amendment Act 1979 in November 1978. He presented the committee's recommendations to the plenary.

=== Minister of State to the Federal Chancellor ===
Following the election of Helmut Kohl as Chancellor, Vogel was appointed Minister of State to the Federal Chancellor on 4 October 1982. He was responsible for the government's relations with the Bundesrat. He left office on 12 March 1987, after the 1987 federal election.

=== Human rights subcommittee ===
From 1987 to 1994 Vogel chaired the Subcommittee on Human Rights and Humanitarian Aid of the Bundestag's Foreign Affairs Committee. On 22 February 1988 the subcommittee held a public hearing on whether German citizens were held against their will and under conditions violating human rights in Colonia Dignidad in Chile. Former members of the colony, their relatives and the colony's doctor Hartmut Hopp took part. The hearing was not a committee of inquiry, and those invited did not appear as witnesses. The public prosecutor's office in Bonn investigated Hopp from at least the time of the hearing.

=== Committee of inquiry on Kommerzielle Koordinierung ===
In the 12th Bundestag (1990–1994) Vogel chaired the first committee of inquiry, which examined the Kommerzielle Koordinierung (KoKo), the East German foreign-currency organisation headed by Alexander Schalck-Golodkowski. The committee issued interim reports in 1992, a final report in May 1994 and a supplementary report in November 1994. He did not stand in the 1994 federal election.

== Personal life ==
Vogel was a Protestant. He was married and had five children. He died in Warendorf on 9 December 2005. His papers are held by the Archive for Christian Democratic Policy in Sankt Augustin.

== Selected works ==
- "Wie geht die Politik der Erneuerung weiter? Außen-, Sicherheits- und Deutschlandpolitik". In: Evangelischer Arbeitskreis der CDU und CSU (ed.): Politik der Erneuerung. Bonn 1986, pp. 26–44.
- (ed., with Hartmut Bühl): Wehrdienst aus Gewissensgründen. Zur politischen und ethischen Legitimation der Verteidigung. Herford 1987.
- "Möglichkeiten und Grenzen 'christlicher Politik' unter der Geltung des Grundgesetzes der Bundesrepublik Deutschland". In: Stefan Smid, Norbert Fehl (eds.): Recht und Pluralismus. Hans-Martin Pawlowski zum 65. Geburtstag. Berlin 1997, pp. 77–94.
