= I Was at Home, But =

2019 film

- Film poster
- Directed by: Angela Schanelec
- Written by: Angela Schanelec
- Starring: Franz Rogowski
- Cinematography: Ivan Marković
- Release date: 12 February 2019 (Berlin)
- Countries: Germany, Serbia
- Language: German
- Box office: $14,026

I Was at Home, But (German: Ich war zuhause, aber) is a 2019 German-Serbian drama film directed by Angela Schanelec. It was selected to compete for the Golden Bear at the 69th Berlin International Film Festival. At Berlin, Schanelec won the Silver Bear for Best Director. The film also competed at the 34th Mar del Plata International Film Festival, where Schanelec was awarded with the Silver Ástor for Best Director.

== Plot ==
The film follows the existential conflict between a mother and her 14-year-old son's teachers after the boy returns home after being missing for a week.

== Cast ==
- Maren Eggert as Astrid
- Clara Möller as Flo
- Jakob Lassalle as Phillip
- Franz Rogowski as Lars
- Alan Williams as Herr Meisner
- Devid Striesow as Gertjan
- Lilith Stangenberg as Claudia

== Reception ==
On review aggregator website Rotten Tomatoes, the film holds an approval rating of 88% based on 32 reviews. The site's critical consensus reads, "I Was at Home, But... withholds easy gratification, but viewers who settle into its austere rhythms will be rewarded with a story rich with meaning." Metacritic, which uses a weighted average, assigned the film a score of 67 out of 100, based on 12 critics, indicating "generally favorable" reviews.
