= A Decent Man =

A Decent Man may refer to:

- A Decent Man (2015 Swiss film) by Micha Lewinsky
- A Decent Man (2015 French film) by Emmanuel Finkiel
