= Gian-Piero Ringel =

German producer (born 1976)

Gian-Piero Ringel (born 1976 in Göppingen) is a German film producer. He was nominated for an Academy Award and a BAFTA for the documentary Pina, which won the German and the European Film Award in 2011.

== Career ==
Ringel studied film production at the Deutsche Film- und Fernsehakademie Berlin (dffb) under the direction of Reinhard Hauff. In 2006, he co-founded the production company Neue Road Movies GmbH with Wim Wenders. In 2011, he founded Ringel Film GmbH, which he has led as sole owner and managing director since 2016.

He produced the 3D documentary Pina about the choreographer Pina Bausch, as well as Every Thing Will Be Fine, starring James Franco, Charlotte Gainsbourg and Rachel McAdams. He also served as co-producer on Jim Jarmusch’s Only Lovers Left Alive. Ringel has produced and co-produced films by directors including Wim Wenders, Angela Schanelec, Sven Bohse, Michael Glawogger, Robert Redford, Jim Jarmusch, Karim Aïnouz, Michael Madsen, Margreth Olin, Erik Skjoldbjærg, Bobbie Peers, and Emily Atef.

His first production, Das Maß der Dinge directed by Sven Bohse, was nominated for a Student Academy Awards. In 2010, Angela Schanelec’s Orly premiered at the Berlin International Film Festival. In 2012, Pina received nominations for both the Academy Award and the BAFTA, and won the German and European Film Awards in 2011. The film was co-produced with Claudie Ossard (Eurowide Film, Paris).

A member of the German, British, and European Film Academies, he served on the board of PROG Producers of Germany (formerly Produzentenverband) from 2019 to 2021, where he was responsible for innovation initiatives. He is also a co-founder of the FilmTech Office, a co-working space for creatives and entrepreneurs operating at the intersection of film, storytelling, and technology.

== Filmography (selection) ==
- 2004: The Measure of Things
- 2007: Afternoon
- 2008: The Palermo Shooting
- 2010: Orly
- 2011: Pina
- 2011: Unfair World (co-producer)
- 2013: Lupu (co-producer)
- 2013: Only Lovers Left Alive (co-producer)
- 2014: Cathedrals of Culture
- 2015: Dirk Ohm: The Disappearing Illusionist (co-producer)
- 2015: Every Thing Will Be Fine
- 2016: The Beautiful Days of Aranjuez (co-producer)
- 2016: Pyromaniac (co-producer)
- 2026: Call Me Queen (post-production)

== Honors ==
- 2006: Student Academy Awards – nomination for The Measure of Things
- 2010: Filmkunstpreis, Festival of German Film – Best Film for Orly
- 2011: Deutscher Filmpreis – Best Documentary for Pina
- 2011: European Film Award – Best Documentary for Pina
- 2012: Academy Award nomination – Best Documentary for Pina
- 2012: BAFTA nomination – Best Film Not in the English Language for Pina
