= Juan Maino =

Photographer and political activist

- Born: Juan Bosco Maino Canales; 19 February 1949; Santiago, Chile
- Disappeared: 26 May 1976; Ñuñoa, Chile
- Status: Missing for 50 years, 1 month and 16 days
- Education: Universidad Técnica del Estado
- Occupations: Photographer; mechanical engineer; political activist
- Political party: Popular Unitary Action Movement
- Partner: Gloria Evangelina Torres Ávila (1973–)
- Mother: Filma Canales

Juan Bosco Maino Canales (19 February 1949 – disappeared 26 May 1976) was a Chilean-Italian photographer, mechanical engineer, political activist and member and leader of the Popular Unitary Action Movement (MAPU). On 26 May 1976 Maino was arrested by DINA agents and subsequently forcibly disappeared.

== Early life ==
Juan Bosco Maino Canales was born 18 February 1949 in Santiago, Chile. Maino's mother, Filma Canales (1923–2014), was a documentary filmmaker, film critic and professor at the Pontifical Catholic University of Chile Film Institute. Maino's father (–1967), a diary company manager, was a first generation Italian Chilean. Through his parents Maino held both Chilean and Italian citizenship. Maino was one of five children.

Educated at Colegio Seminario Pontificio Menor and Patrocinio San José, Maino went on to study mechanical engineering at Universidad Técnica del Estado. It's assumed that Maino joined MAPU whilst at university.

== Career ==
=== Photography ===
Between 1973 and 1976, Maino worked as a photographer for the Center for Educational Research and Development (CIDE). Maino also worked as a photographer for the Committee of Cooperation for Peace in Chile and the Asociación Cristiana Evangélica (AEC).

=== Political activism ===
From 1974, Maino worked directly alongside the MAPU Secretary General Carlos Montes Cisternas. Maino was trusted with knowing the location of Montes and his wife Gloria Cruz Domínguez.

== Arrest ==
In the spring of 1976, Maino was working on his thesis with classmate Antonio Elizondo Ormaechea, a graduate engineering student and fellow member of MAPU. Maino often visited and stayed at the Ñuñoa home Elizondo shared with his wife Elizabeth Rekas Urra, a social worker, Santiago Metro worker and member of MAPU. A few days before his arrest on the 26 May, Maino visited the home of partner Gloria Evangelina Torres Ávila, a human rights lawyer and member of MAPU. Maino informed Torres about the arrest of several MAPU members and his belief that he was being followed by DINA agents.

On 22 May, Andrés Constantino Rekas Urra, the brother of Elizabeth Rekas Urra, was informed by his neighbours that plain clothes DINA agents were asking about him, his activities and where he worked. On 23 May the same DINA agents returned to neighbourhood, and began asking about Elizondo and Elizabeth. On 24 May at around 3 pm, Andrés was arrested in public by DINA agents and taken to Villa Grimaldi. Andrés was tortured and interrogated by DINA agents about the activities and whereabouts of his sister, brother-in-law and Maino. On the 25 May, Andrés was taken from Villa Grimaldi and forced to verify his sisters and brother-in-law's identities before being returned to the torture centre.

On 26 May around 6:30 pm, Elizondo was arrested in downtown Santiago. At approximately 10 pm, Maino and Elizabeth Rekas Urra, who was four months pregnant, were arrested at the Elizondo Rekas home. Andrés was released the same day, but no trace of Antonio Elizondo, Elizabeth Rekas and Juan Maino has been found since then. It's believed that Maino died during torture. Days after his disappearance, Maino's mother presented a habeas corpus to the 8th Criminal Tribunal of Santiago. The court refused to investigate the case. In the Chilean criminal system, investigating, prosecuting, and judging were all then done by only one person, the criminal judge, according to Judge Juan Guzmán's autobiography, released in 2005.

== Investigation ==
In 2005, Paul Schäfer, the former leader the enclave of Colonia Dignidad, Chile, was charged with involvement in his "disappearance" after two cars owned by Maino were found inside Colonia Dignidad.

== Personal life ==
In 1973, Maino met Gloria Evangelina Torres Ávila and soon became engaged.
