= Friedrich Vogel =

Friedrich Vogel may refer to:

- Friedrich Vogel (human geneticist) (1925–2006), human geneticist
- Friedrich Vogel (politician) (1929–2005), German politician
- Friedrich Vogel (publisher) (1902–1976), German publisher (Handelsblatt)
- Friedrich Vogel, more commonly known as Frederick Vogel, an American tanner and businessman from Milwaukee, Wisconsin
