= Every Thing Will Be Fine =

- Theatrical release poster
- Directed by: Wim Wenders
- Written by: Bjørn Olaf Johannessen
- Produced by: Gian-Piero Ringel
- Starring: James Franco; Charlotte Gainsbourg; Marie-Josée Croze; Robert Naylor; Patrick Bauchau; Peter Stormare; Rachel McAdams
- Cinematography: Benoît Debie
- Edited by: Toni Froschhammer
- Music by: Alexandre Desplat
- Production companies: Neue Road Movies; Montauk Productions; Göta Film; Film i Väst
- Distributed by: Warner Bros. Pictures (Germany); IFC Films (United States)
- Release dates: February 10, 2015 (Berlin); April 2, 2015 (Germany); December 4, 2015 (United States)
- Running time: 118 minutes
- Countries: Germany; France; Sweden; Norway; Canada
- Language: English
- Box office: $473,965

Every Thing Will Be Fine is a 2015 drama film directed by Wim Wenders, written by Bjørn Olaf Johannessen and produced in 3D. It is Wenders’ first full-length dramatic feature in seven years. The film stars James Franco, Charlotte Gainsbourg, Rachel McAdams and Marie-Josée Croze. It premiered out of competition on February 10, 2015 at the 65th Berlin International Film Festival. The film made its North American premiere at the Toronto International Film Festival on September 11, 2015. It was released in the United States in a limited release and through video on demand by IFC Films on December 4, 2015.

== Plot ==
Tomas Eldan is a novelist, living with Sara in a rural area of Quebec. Their relationship is strained, as she wants marriage and children while he just wants to focus on his writing. Tomas is driving home on a wintery rural road when a toboggan carrying brothers Christopher and Nicholas slides into the path of his vehicle, resulting in Nicholas' death but causing no physical damage to five-year-old Christopher.

Tomas breaks up with Sara a short time after the tragic accident, then he briefly spirals into alcohol and drugs before ending up in hospital after a suicide attempt. He tries to get together with Sara again but it doesn't work. He turns his focus back to his writing, gaining success while still troubled by the effect of the tragedy on his life. He maintains fleeting contact with Kate, the mother of Nicholas and Christopher, who struggles with her own guilt and loss. Tomas later marries Ann, an employee of his publishing house, adopting her daughter Mina.

Eleven years after the accident, a winner of the Giller Prize for his latest novel, Tomas receives a letter from now 16-year-old Christopher. Christopher is a self-proclaimed "problem child", whose school psychologist has suggested reaching out to Tomas. Their contacts are troubling but end with Tomas and Christopher eventually helping each other get a calmer handle on their lives.

== Cast ==
- James Franco as Tomas Eldan
- Charlotte Gainsbourg as Kate
- Marie-Josée Croze as Ann
- Robert Naylor as Christopher
  - Jack Fulton as Christopher 5–8 years old
  - Philippe Vanasse-Paquet as 12-year-old Christopher
- Patrick Bauchau as Dad
- Peter Stormare as Editor
- Rachel McAdams as Sara
- Julia Sarah Stone as Mina
  - Lilah Fitzgerald as Young Mina

== Production ==
Producer Gian-Piero Ringel, through his company Neue Road Movies, produced the film to which HanWay Films has worldwide distribution rights. Belgian Benoît Debie was the director of photography. It was released by Warner Bros. in Germany and by Mongrel Media in Canada. One week before the film's premiere at the Berlin Film Festival, French composer Alexandre Desplat recorded the score with the Gothenburg Symphony Orchestra in Sweden.

=== Casting ===
On May 7, 2013, James Franco joined the cast of the film as lead actor, playing Tomas Eldan, a writer who accidentally causes the death of a child. The day before shooting began, it was announced that the cast would include Charlotte Gainsbourg and Marie-Josée Croze; with Gainsbourg set to play the female lead role.

=== Filming ===
Director Wim Wenders began shooting the film in Montreal, Quebec on August 13, 2013. After a break, shooting resumed in Winter 2014.

== Release ==
The film had its world premiere at the Berlin International Film Festival on February 10, 2015. The film was released in Germany on April 2, 2015 and in France on April 22, 2015. The film had its North American premiere at the Toronto International Film Festival, on September 11, 2015. Prior to the premiere, IFC Films acquired U.S. distribution rights to the film. The film was released in a limited release and through video on demand on December 4, 2015.

== Reception ==
The film received generally negative reviews, holding a 28% rating on the review aggregator website Rotten Tomatoes, based on 40 reviews, with an average rating of 4.8/10. The site's critical consensus states: "Every Thing Will Be Fine finds director Wim Wenders in not-so-fine form, delivering a film of moral quandary that never leaps off the screen despite its 3-D stylization." Metacritic assigns a rating of 32 out of 100, based on thirteen critics' reviews, indicating "generally unfavorable reviews".
