= Marseille (2004 film) =

2004 film

- Film poster
- Directed by: Angela Schanelec
- Written by: Angela Schanelec
- Produced by: Florian Koerner von Gustorf; Michael Weber
- Starring: Maren Eggert
- Cinematography: Reinhold Vorschneider
- Edited by: Bettina Böhler
- Release date: 23 September 2004
- Running time: 95 minutes
- Country: Germany
- Language: German

Marseille is a 2004 German drama film directed by Angela Schanelec. It was screened in the Un Certain Regard section at the 2004 Cannes Film Festival.

== Synopsis ==
Sophie, a young photographer, does an apartment swap with Zelda from Marseille in February, so she can get away from Berlin. While Marseille appears harsh and closed in the bright sun, she starts photographing the city. In a car repair garage, she meets Pierre, a young mechanic who lends her his car, and she drives around. They meet again that night and spend the evening in a bar, fascinated by the lightness of not knowing about each other until one of Pierre's acquaintances comes. The next night, Sophie joins Pierre and his friends to go dancing. One very sharp cut later, Sophie is back in Berlin and her old life. There is her best friend Hanna, who is an actress, Ivan, Hanna's husband who is also a photographer, and their son Anton. No one yet knows Sophie's love for Ivan. Soon after, she finds herself in Marseille again.

== Cast ==
- Maren Eggert as Sophie
- Alexis Loret as Pierre
- Marie-Lou Sellem as Hanna
- Devid Striesow as Ivan
- Louis Schanelec as Anton
- Emily Atef as Zelda
