= Paul Schäfer =

German criminal and founder of a sect in Chile (1921–2010)

- Born: 4 December 1921; Bonn, Weimar Republic
- Died: 24 April 2010 (aged 88); Santiago, Chile
- Occupation: Christian minister
- Known for: Cult leader of Colonia Dignidad
- Criminal charges: Rape and indecent assault; aggravated homicide; weapons offenses; infliction of bodily injury (torture)
- Criminal penalty: 20 years imprisonment; additional years added by latter convictions
- Criminal status: Died in prison

Paul Schäfer Schneider (Note: German pronunciation: [paʊl ˈʃɛːfɐ ˈʃnaɪdɐ], Spanish pronunciation: [pol ˈtʃefeɾ (e)sˈnajðeɾ].) (4 December 1921 – 24 April 2010) was a German-Chilean Christian minister, convicted sexual offender, and the founder and leader of a sect and agricultural commune of 300 German immigrants called Colonia Dignidad ("Dignity Colony", later renamed Villa Baviera) located in Parral in southern Chile, about 340 km (210 miles) south of Santiago from 1961 to 2005. Schäfer was strongly influenced by the teachings of William Branham.

Aside from human rights abuses against members of Colonia Dignidad, including rape and sexual and physical abuse (including torture) of young children, Schäfer maintained a relationship with Pinochet's military dictatorship (1973–1990) and was involved in weapons smuggling and the torture and extrajudicial killings of political dissidents. After the end of Pinochet's government, increased public awareness of the activities of Colonia Dignidad, following testimony from former victims, led to the issuance of a warrant for Schäfer's arrest. He fled Chile and lived underground in Argentina for eight years. Following extradition back to Chile and a conviction for sexual abuse, he spent the last five years of his life in prison in Chile. He was convicted of homicide and other felonies in several trials that followed his initial conviction.

== Early life and education ==
Schäfer was born in Bonn as the third child of Jakob and Anna (née Schneider; later Schmitz) Schäfer. He was raised Lutheran in the Ortschaft Spich, part of Troisdorf. At age six, Schäfer accidentally stabbed his right eye with a fork while attempting to undo a knot in his shoelace. The eye had to be removed and was replaced with a glass eye. Already the target of frequent bullying, he acquired the nickname "Glass Eye" (German: Glasauge) following the accident. Schäfer's parents divorced in 1932, after which he never saw his father again. He grew resentful of his mother for her remarriage the following year to Peter Schmitz. During his school years, he was described as a poor and clumsy student who had to repeat two grades in a row. In 1933, when Schäfer was eleven or twelve years old, he joined the Eichenkreuz, a German YMCA sports group. He refused to attend mandatory Hitler Youth meetings. Schäfer left school at age 14 while still in the sixth grade and began an apprenticeship at a munitions factory operated by Dynamit Nobel AG. At 18, Schäfer moved to Siegburg, near Bonn.

=== World War II ===
In October 1940, he was conscripted into the Reich Labour Service. On 6 February 1941, he was drafted for military service in the Replacement Army, with duty as a medic. Due to his impaired sight, he was not deployed to the front lines. He received basic nurse training in Münster and spent the majority of his service carrying wounded soldiers on stretchers in a German field hospital in occupied France. Schäfer claimed later in life that his glass eye was the result of a war wound and that he believed his father and two older brothers were killed in action while serving in the Wehrmacht. Researchers have investigated Schäfer's potential involvement in German war crimes, specifically possible stationing at forced labour camps for Dynamit Nobel in Troisdorf or at a HASAG-run subcamp of Buchenwald concentration camp, but none could be confirmed by government records.

=== Postwar life ===
After the end of the war, Schäfer moved back with his mother and stepfather. He was frequently unemployed and found occasional work as a carnival worker through a former classmate. In 1946, he was named the leader of the youth group "Leubelfing" in Troisdorf, as the previous head, Schäfer's brother Walter, was killed during World War II. He expanded greatly on the choir and theatre projects of the group and by the end of the year, Schäfer made contact with the Evangelical Free Church at a YMCA convention. Between 1947 and 1949, Schäfer lived in Benroth, near Waldbröl, on the grounds of an Evangelical bible school, owned by Friedrich Baron von der Ropp. According to later investigations, Schäfer may have committed his first known acts of child molestation at the school, where he was known to invite boys into his living quarters for what he called "private prayer".

== Cult leader ==
=== Early preaching and religious leadership ===
Schäfer relocated to Gartow, where he worked at a Diakonie-run retirement home and as a youth warden at the St. George Church, but was terminated from both positions for "negative influence on youths and cult-like behaviour". One father complained that his 13-year-old son had lost a considerable amount of weight. He further alleged that they would sneak out of the house in the evening and return at 4:00 in the morning, claiming to have prayed and sung hymns with Schäfer and other youths in the forest. Following his dismissal, Schäfer reportedly spent several days living in the forest, later claiming to have encountered Jesus there. He subsequently founded and ran his own Christian youth clubs in Gartow as a lay preacher, occasionally speaking at Pentecostal events in the area, until leaving the area in the summer of 1952. For the next two years, while continuing to operate his own groups, Schäfer worked as a youth leader for several Christian organizations in Heidenheim, Brilon, and Mönchengladbach. All eventually expelled him, officially because of his teaching methods, although by this point local church communities were also circulating allegations of child sexual abuse, which were never reported to police.

Willi Georg, who frequently attended Schäfer's night-time sermons as a child, recalled that Schäfer once declared, "We serve the Lord Jesus. The Lord Jesus is me." According to Georg, Schäfer was occasionally accompanied by other adult preachers. Schäfer instructed the boys to obey his teachings and encouraged them to report disloyalty, which was punished by beatings carried out by the older boys. Schäfer openly talked about his misogynist views, saying that "women have nothing to say and ought to keep silent", and describing relationships with women as "lust of the flesh" and "devil's stuff". Romantic relationships and other forms of disobedience were severely punished. Punishments included forced medication with psychiatric drugs, electric shocks, and group beatings to "drive out the devil", as well as multi-day fasts.

=== Influence of William Branham ===
During the 1950s, Schäfer became a follower and promoter of the teachings of American preacher William M. Branham, one of the founders of the post-World War II healing revival. Branham was also an early influence on Jim Jones. Branham held multiple revival campaigns across Europe during the early 1950s. Schäfer had followed Branham's ministry from Germany and was eager to meet Branham when he visited the country in 1955. Schäfer and other members of his church served as Branham's personal security detail on his 1955 European tour. Branham's teachings promoted a return to what he viewed as a more pristine age of religious and racial purity. He advocated strict adherence to the Bible, taught that wives should obey their husbands, and promoted apocalyptic visions, including the prediction that Los Angeles would sink into the ocean.

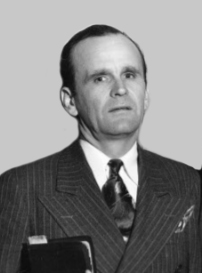
During the 1950s, Paul Schäfer became a follower of the teachings of William Branham (pictured in 1947).

Strong ties developed among Schäfer, Branham, and Ewald Frank during Branham's time in Germany. Schäfer was deeply impressed by Branham, not only because of his reported healing abilities, but also because he regarded the Latter Rain doctrine, a central theme in Branham's preaching, as conveying a totalitarian, misogynistic, and apocalyptic message that he believed could strongly influence followers. A sermon preached by Branham during his visit to Karlsruhe on the Pool of Bethesda left a deep impression on Schäfer. In it, Branham taught that all illness and sin were demons entrenched in people's bodies. Schäfer claimed to have experienced a healing during the meeting and afterward began to preach the doctrine that both sin and illness were the result of demonic possession.

Following the 1955 meetings with Branham, Schäfer increasingly put Branham's doctrines into practice within his group and insisted that his followers were the only people truly faithful to Branham's teachings.

=== Creation of religious community and sexual abuse charges ===
By 1952, Schäfer had gathered a number of followers and in 1953 set up a children's home and orphanage. Schäfer's early followers consisted largely of war widows and their children who had fled Soviet-occupied East Prussia. In 1954, Schäfer and others created the Private Social Mission, as an evangelical free church community based out of Siegburg, Gronau, and Hamburg. In 1959, Schäfer was charged with sexually abusing two young boys. A warrant was issued for his arrest by authorities in Siegburg, prompting him to flee the area. Accompanied by several followers, Schäfer undertook an extensive journey through Spain, North Africa, the Middle East, and Turkey while exploring possible destinations for the emigration of his sect. After returning to West Germany, he came into contact with the Chilean ambassador, who, unaware of the criminal charges against Schäfer, invited him to settle in Chile.

== Colonia Dignidad ==
=== Early years ===
In January 1961, Schäfer and a small group of followers migrated to Chile, where the government at the time, led by conservative President Jorge Alessandri, had granted him permission to create the "Dignidad Beneficent Society" on a farm outside of Parral. Schäfer purchased a 3,062-hectare (7,566-acre) ranch, which he and ten followers began preparing for the arrival of the rest of the congregation. This would become the core of Colonia Dignidad, which would grow larger in later years with additional land purchases. In 1963, 230 members of his congregation traveled to Chile in the first wave of immigrants. Another 15 families immigrated in two more waves in 1966 and 1973. Schäfer may have been influenced to move to South America by prophecies of William Branham, who repeatedly predicted an imminent nuclear war that would devastate Western nations.

According to Colonia Dignidad researcher Friedrich Paul Heller, with only a few exceptions, members of the cult came from limited educational backgrounds, which Heller argued made them less likely to question Schäfer's teachings. Schäfer kept children away from their parents in a children's house, sometimes relocating them entirely under the guise of a choir trip. He said, "The problems in child education aren't the children; they are always the parents because the parents are responsible for the sins of the children."

Proceeds from the sale of the cult's property in Germany financed the purchase of a stone crusher, which Schäfer exported to Chile and used for quarrying. The quarry proved profitable through business with local Chileans. Within six years, the colony harvested its first wheat crop, converted its barracks into houses, and built a hospital. Successful treatment of Chilean children at the hospital brought Schäfer considerable local prestige.

Schäfer was treated in a Santiago hospital for several months following a gunshot accident during a nighttime hunting expedition. Upon his return to the colony, he forbade all festivities, and separated men from women and boys from girls.

In 1966, Wolfgang Kneese, a teenager who had fled from Colonia Dignidad, took refuge in the West German embassy in Santiago and later spoke to the press. A lawyer representing the colony subsequently initiated defamation proceedings against him. Schäfer induced another teenager named Hartmut Hopp to accuse Kneese of sexual misconduct. Fearing that he would fall into Schäfer's hands again, Kneese ultimately fled across the Andes to Argentina before returning to Germany. (Kneese's conviction was overturned by the Supreme Court of Chile in 2017.) Schäfer rewarded Hopp by financing his medical education, which also provided a much-needed physician for the colony's hospital.

=== Relationship with the Allende and Pinochet governments ===
After the election of Salvador Allende in 1970, Schäfer turned the compound into a fortress, fearing that the new socialist government would expropriate the colony's property. Knowing that containers for his charitable organization were not checked by customs, Schäfer began smuggling weapons from Germany, including machine guns, which were soon copied in the colony's machine shop. He invited right-wing dissidents including Roberto Thieme, the leader of the neo-fascist group Patria y Libertad, to Colonia Dignidad and offered the colony as a base from which to plan a coup against Allende. During this time, Schäfer also began punishing children with electric shocks to their bodies, including to their genitalia, to keep them in line.

Following the 1973 coup that brought the military regime of Augusto Pinochet to power, Colonia Dignidad was used as a clandestine detention, torture, and execution center for DINA (Dirección de Inteligencia Nacional), the Chilean secret police during the military dictatorship in Chile. In 1974, Pinochet visited Schäfer at Colonia Dignidad and was given a Mercedes-Benz 600 Pullman limousine.

After the US arms embargo against Chile, Schäfer dealt with German arms dealer Gerhard Mertins, who supplied Pinochet with weapons including rockets, tanks, and equipment to produce biological weapons. In 1976, Amnesty International published evidence about torture at Colonia Dignidad (later verified in the 1991 Chilean National Commission for Truth and Reconciliation Report). The West German embassy dispatched a delegation to investigate the allegations, but subsequently stated that it had found no evidence supporting them. A delegation from the CSU also visited the colony and was welcomed with a program that included Bavarian folk dances. During a 1986 visit to Chile, German Member of the Bundestag Norbert Blüm requested permission to visit Colonia Dignidad to investigate reports of human rights violations there, but was denied entry. He later called the colony "a model farm of contempt for mankind". In 1988, the German Public Prosecutor General started proceedings against members of the colony.

=== After Pinochet ===
In 1990, after Pinochet had stepped down, Patricio Aylwin cut off state funding for Schäfer's hospital, revoking its nonprofit and charitable status and auditing the colony's businesses. In 1991, Schäfer privatized his various enterprises. When German Chancellor Helmut Kohl visited Chile, he stated that the colony should be opened to outside scrutiny, but took no further action. Schäfer then mobilized the local residents to demonstrate against the closing of his hospital until the Chilean government reopened it.

Chilean children were admitted to the colony because the settlement's own members had no children. Schäfer began molesting Chilean boys at the colony; if they resisted, he used sedatives prescribed by Hartmut Hopp, the colony's physician, to facilitate the assaults.

== Criminal investigation and imprisonment ==
=== Investigation and flight from Chile ===
In 1996, a judge in Santiago issued a warrant for Schäfer's arrest after 26 children who had attended the colony's free clinic and school reported their abuse. Police could not find him on the compound. Schäfer turned teary-eyed departures into propaganda to prove his innocence. He then staged a farewell ceremony and disappeared into the network of tunnels and bunkers beneath Colonia Dignidad. He disappeared on 20 May 1997, after Chilean authorities under President Eduardo Frei Ruiz-Tagle filed charges of child sexual abuse against him.

Several local farming families reported that Schäfer had also molested children outside his community. Children continued to attend the boarding school, but support from local parents dwindled. In July 1997, two boys fled to the German embassy; one of them, Tobias Müller, was flown out to Germany. In 2004, Schäfer was tried in absentia and found guilty by a Chilean court.

As of 2005, he was under investigation in connection with human rights abuses at Colonia Dignidad and the disappearance of Russian mathematician Boris Weisfeiler, who was last seen hiking near the colony in 1985. Schäfer was also wanted in Germany and France in connection with earlier child abuse allegations.

=== Arrest and trials ===
In March 2005, Schäfer was found in Argentina nearly eight years after his flight from Chile, hiding in a gated community in the city of Tortuguitas, near Buenos Aires. After two days of negotiations between Chilean and Argentine authorities, Schäfer was extradited to Chile to face a court hearing. He was subsequently investigated for alleged involvement in the 1976 disappearance of political activist Juan Maino. In July 2005, police uncovered Schäfer's buried cache of military weapons, much of it dating from World War II but also including automatic weapons and grenades produced in the colony's own facilities.

On 24 May 2006, Schäfer was sentenced to 20 years' imprisonment for 20 counts of indecent assault and 5 counts of forced sodomy committed on 25 minors at Colonia Dignidad between 1993 and 1997. He was also ordered to pay 770 million pesos (approximately US$1.5 million) in civil damages to 11 victims whose representatives had filed claims against Schäfer.

From 2006 to 2008, Schäfer was convicted of a series of other crimes in three further trials, adding to his prison sentence. The additional convictions included:

- A sentence of 7 years for the aggravated homicide of Miguel Ángel Becerra Hidalgo (a DINA agent stationed at Colonia Dignidad who had attempted to leave the agency);
- A sentence of 3 years and one day for causing bodily harm arising from the torture of five former colony residents;
- A sentence of 3 years and 300 days for unlawful weapons possession, stemming from the extensive weapons cache found at Colonia Dignidad in 2005.

Schäfer was also the subject of three investigations for kidnapping at the time of his death in 2010.

== Death ==
On 24 April 2010, Schäfer died from heart failure at the prison infirmary of the Centro de Detención Preventiva Santiago Sur in Santiago. He was 88. It was later reported that he was suffering from a severe cardiac illness.

== In popular culture ==
Actor Mikael Nyqvist portrays Schäfer in the 2015 film Colonia.
