= Amaya Forch =

Chilean actress and pop singer

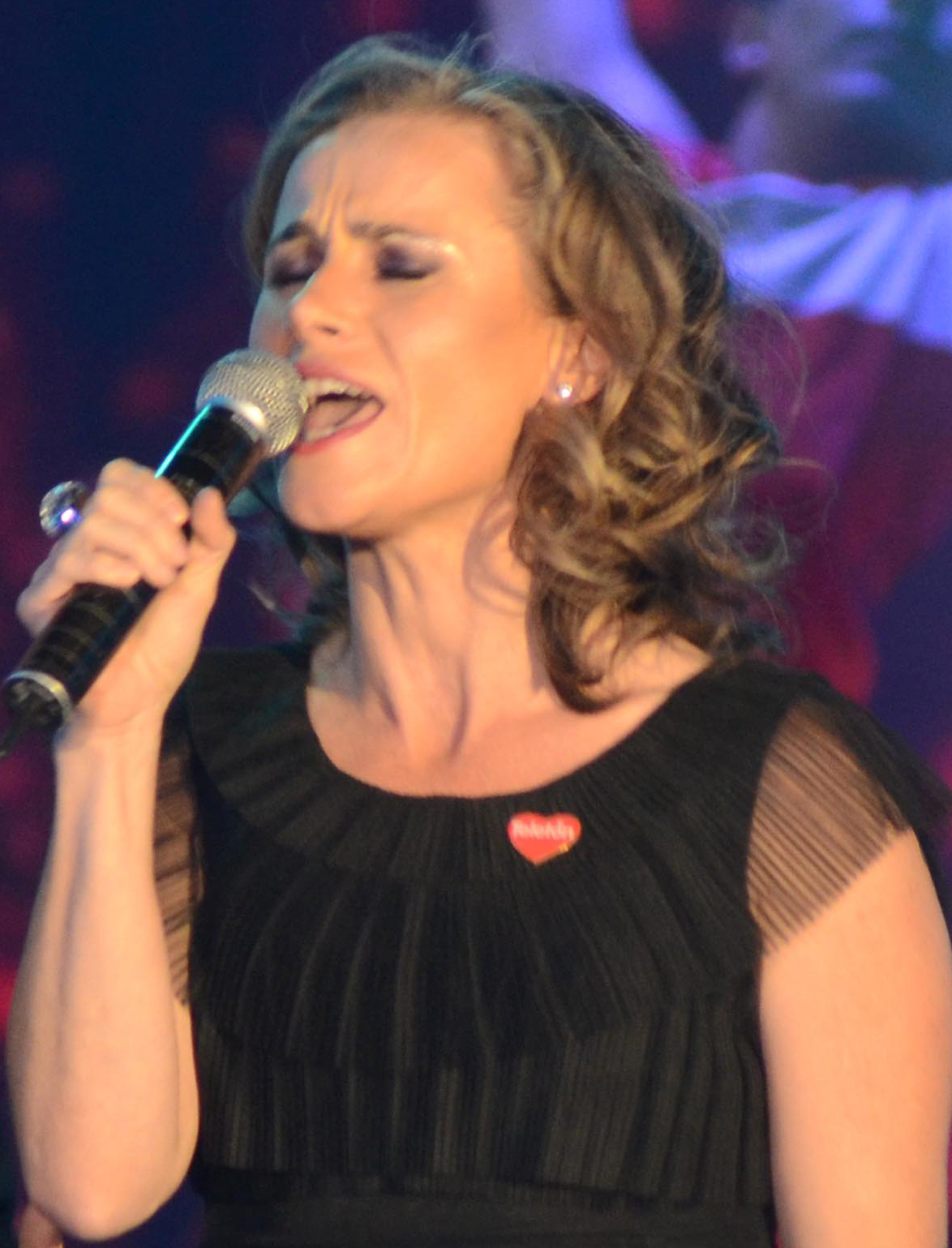
- Amaya Forch in 2014
- Born: Amaya Vivienne Forch Barry; 5 March 1972 (age 54)
- Occupations: Singer, actress
- Years active: Since 1973
- Spouse: Amaro Gómez-Pablos (divorced)

Amaya Forch Barry (born 5 March 1972) is a Chilean actress and pop singer known for making appearances on various Chilean television programs.

After playing in a number of television and theatre productions, Forch began to venture into singing. At the Viña del Mar International Song Festival, she sang alongside David Hasselhoff. In 2002, Forch played Carmela in a production of La pérgola de las flores and also joined the talent show Rojo as a judge. In 2004, she played in the Televisión Nacional de Chile (TVN) telenovela Ídolos and a production of Man of La Mancha in 2009. That same year, she appeared on TVN's El Baile en TVN, the Chilean version of Dancing with the Stars. In 2019–20, she played in the Chilean-German thriller television series Dignity a recurring character.

In 2010, Forch and Valentín Trujillo recorded a collaboration song for an album featuring numerous Chilean artists to raise relief funds for the 2010 earthquakes in Chile and Haiti.

In 2006, Forch married journalist Amaro Gómez-Pablos and their marriage would end a decade later in 2014 over several months. After the divorce, she returned to acting and singing with the seventh season of Los 80.
