= Maren Eggert =

German actress (born 1974)

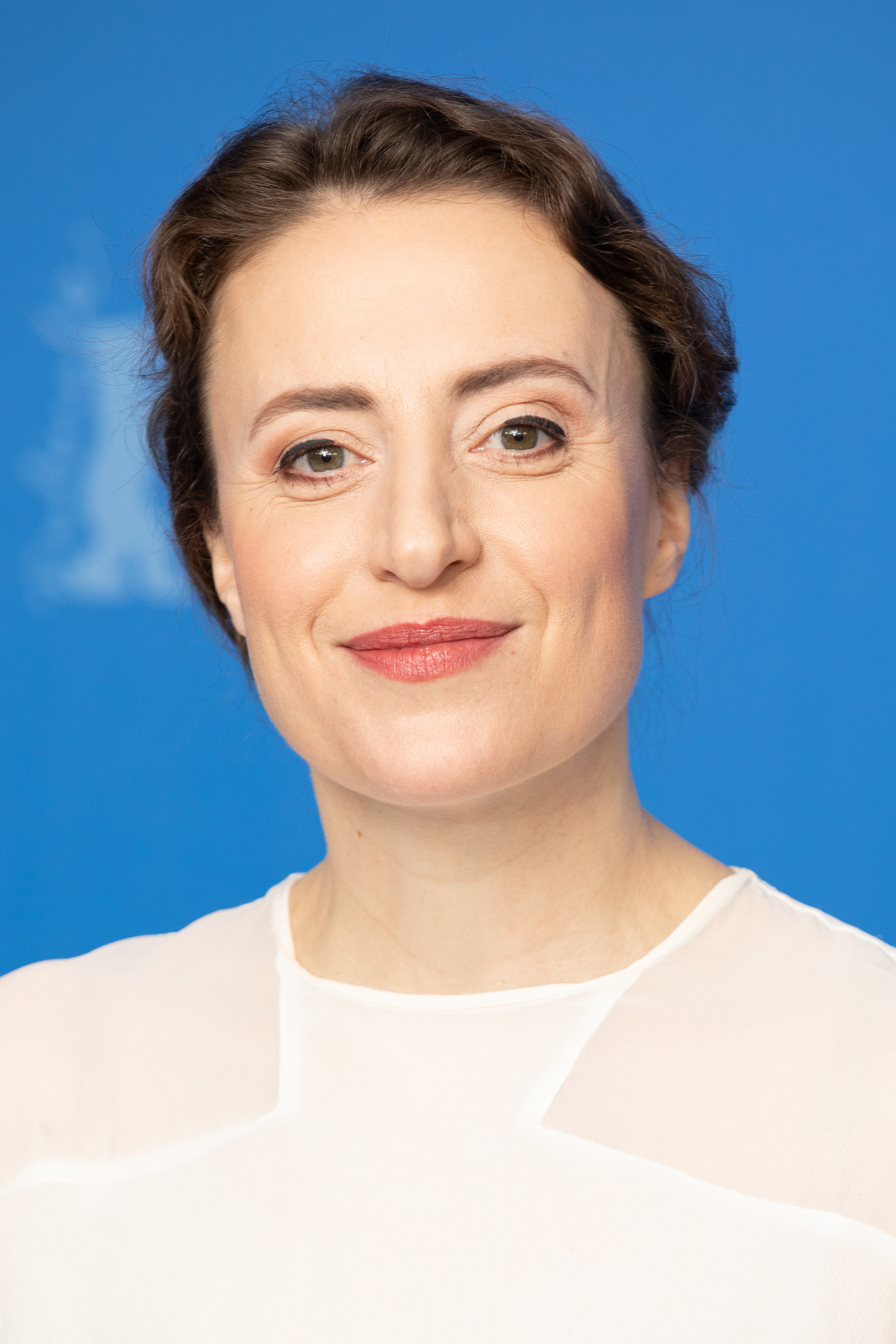
- Eggert in 2019
- Born: 30 January 1974 (age 52); Hamburg, West Germany
- Occupation: Actress
- Years active: 1997–present

Maren Eggert (born 30 January 1974) is a German actress. She is best known for playing the role of Frieda Jung in the German TV series Tatort. Another notable appearance of her is the role of Dora in the 2001 film Das Experiment, opposite Moritz Bleibtreu. She starred in the film Marseille which was screened in the Un Certain Regard section at the 2004 Cannes Film Festival. Besides this she performs at the Thalia theatre in Hamburg.

In 2021, she became the first recipient of the newly created Silver Bear for Best Leading Performance award at the 71st Berlin International Film Festival, for her role in I'm Your Man.

== Film ==
| Year | Title | Role | Notes |
|---|---|---|---|
| 1997 | The Pharmacist | Student | |
| 2001 | The Experiment | Dora | |
| 2004 | Marseille | Sophie | |
| 2008 | Was wenn der Tod uns scheidet? | Lillis Mutter | |
| 2010 | Orly | Sabine | |
| 2013 | Eltern | Julie | |
| 2015 | A Decent Man | Martina | |
| 2016 | The Dreamed Path | Ariane | |
| 2019 | I Was at Home, But... | Mutter Astrid | |
| 2019 | Giraffe | Käthe | |
| 2021 | I'm Your Man | Alma | |
| 2023 | Not a Word | Nina | |
| 2024 | The Sparrow in the Chimney | Karen | |
| 2025 | Gavagai | Maja Tervooren | |
