= Places in Cities =

1998 film

- Theatrical release poster
- Directed by: Angela Schanelec
- Written by: Angela Schanelec
- Produced by: Florian Koerner von Gustorf; Michael Weber
- Starring: Sophie Aigner
- Cinematography: Reinhold Vorschneider
- Edited by: Bettina Böhler; Angela Schanelec
- Release date: 28 September 1998
- Running time: 117 minutes
- Country: Germany
- Language: German

Places in Cities (German: Plätze in Städten) is a 1998 German drama film directed by Angela Schanelec. It was screened in the Un Certain Regard section at the 1998 Cannes Film Festival.

== Cast ==
In alphabetical order

- Sophie Aigner as Mimmi
- Vincent Branchet as Yves
- Katharina Eckerfeld as Mimmi's Girlfriend (as Katie Eckerfeld)
- Martin Jackowski as Christoph
- Friederike Kammer as Mimmi's Mother
- Tobias Langhoff
- Jérôme Robart as Nicolas
- Marie-Lou Sellem
- Michael Sideris as The Man (as Mischa Sideris)
