= Hartmut Hopp =

German minister

Hartmut Wilhelm Hopp (born May 24, 1944, in Western Pomerania) was the doctor of the religious sect and commune called Colonia Dignidad in Chile and the right hand of its leader Paul Schäfer, and follower of the teachings of William Branham. Hopp was sentenced by a Chilean court to five years in prison for complicity in child abuse committed by Paul Schäfer, but he fled the country for Germany and, as a German citizen, was not extradited to Chile by the Federal Republic.

== Colonia Dignidad ==
Hartmut Hopp joined the Private Sociale Mission e. V. in Lohmar-Heide near Siegburg, the community of the later Colonia Dignidad founder Paul Schäfer. In 1961, at the age of 17, he went to Chile with Schäfer, where he set up the Colonia Dignidad. The heavily fenced settlement is located about 350 kilometers south of Santiago de Chile in a rural area. During the military dictatorship under Augusto Pinochet, political prisoners were tortured and murdered in the settlement by the DINA secret service and settlement members. Many people "disappeared" in the Colonia Dignidad and have not appeared to this day. Some of their corpses were buried, some were later exhumed and cremated on Pinochet's orders. The DINA secret service maintained its only other base in Colonia Dignidad besides the headquarters in Santiago, Chile.

Hopp is also said to have been abused by Paul Schäfer as a teenager. Schäfer and some of his advisors instrumentalized Hopp in a false testimony against Wolfgang Kneese, who had fled the colony and reported in the Chilean press about Schäfer's sexual abuse of children. In return, Schäfer denounced Kneese for alleged abuse of Hopp, which Hopp falsely confirmed in court; Kneese was then convicted, but was able to flee to Argentina. Hopp was rewarded and was one of only three members of the group who were allowed to leave the Colonia for their training. He studied medicine at the University of Davis in the USA, as well as piano and singing, and returned in 1977 to complete his medical studies at the Pontificia Universidad Católica de Chile. In the Colonia he married the ten years older nurse Esther Dorothea Witthahn (born September 13, 1934). A little later he was sentenced to a suspended sentence for violating the Chilean weapons law. Human rights activists say that from this point on, Hopp was active as "Foreign Minister" for Colonia Dignidad. Hopp himself denies this.

The human rights organization ECCHR describes the management structure of Colonia Dignidad in its dossier on Hopp. Accordingly, this initially consisted of Paul Schäfer at the top and a group of leaders who were often referred to as Jerarcas ("hierarchs"). The Jerarcas had different functions to fulfill internally or externally. In the early years this group was made up of Gerd Seewald, Kurt Schnellenkamp, Gerhard Mücke, Dorothea Hopp, and Gisela Seewald, among others. The representative in Germany included Alfred Schaak until his death in 1985. After his return from the US, Hopp rose to the Jerarcas in the mid-1970s. In 1977 it appeared for the first time in the national press and in the files of the German embassy in Santiago. Since the 1980s he acted for journalists and ambassadors as the "de facto foreign minister" of the Colonia Dignidad and number 2 at the head of the sect.

In 1978 Hopp became head of the Colonia Dignidad hospital. In the hospital of the settlement people were tortured. Settlers who defied the rules of leader Paul Schäfer were shocked with electric batons and given high doses of psychotropic drugs and Valium against their will. The German doctor Gisela Seewald, a former colleague of Hartmut Hopps, confirmed these measures in a Chilean court. It is unclear what Hopp, as head of the clinic, knew about the practices.

After two families had managed to escape from Colonia Dignidad to the Federal Republic of Germany in 1984, they reported on the conditions in the settlement. The Investigative Committee for Human Rights of the Bundestag heard Hopp on 22 February 1988. It should provide information about whether German involuntarily were in the Colonia Dignidad. However, he remained vague in his statements and was able to return to Chile.

In 1990 the Pinochet dictatorship ended in Chile. In 1991 the democratically elected President Patricio Aylwin dissolved the Colonia Dignidad, while Paul Schäfer continued to fight for his "life's work". From 1995 the Chilean police and judiciary began investigations into the Colonia Dignidad. The following year, Schäfer was sued by Chilean parents. During this time Hartmut Hopp negotiated with the police to get the Colonia.

According to journalist Friedrich Paul Heller, Hartmut Hopp was the one who had close ties to Pinochet and its DINA secret service throughout the entire period. He assumes that Hopp also has knowledge of the accounts that still exist with the assets of the Colonia Dignidad. Hopp himself claimed to the Rheinische Post in 2011: "As far as community or society funds are concerned, I myself have neither ever had them nor had powers of attorney."

== Condemnation and escape ==
In 1997 Paul Schäfer went into hiding in a place that Hopp and his wife arranged for him in Argentina. In 2005, Schäfer was tracked down and arrested. After a heart attack, he was transferred from his cell to the hospital. The Chilean judiciary charged Hopp with aiding and abetting child abuse for bringing children to Schäfer. He and other former members of the Colonia Dignidad have already been sentenced in the first instance to five years in prison for sexual abuse of children and deprivation of liberty. Hopp then fled to Germany.

From August 2011 he was wanted by Interpol. In January 2013, the ruling was upheld by the Chilean Supreme Court in Santiago. Several convicts reported to go to prison in February 2013, but not Hopp. The Supreme Court of Chile decided unanimously in July 2014 to apply for the execution of the detention in Germany.

== Hopp in Germany ==
Hopp and his wife settled in Krefeld because the preacher Ewald Frank runs his Free People's Mission there. Hopp's adopted son and daughter-in-law had already moved to Krefeld, as had Hopp's brother and other families from Colonia Dignidad. There is evidence that Hopp sent a fax to the media from the Free People's Mission. After Ewald Frank had initiated a legal dispute to prevent connections between former colonists and the people's mission from being publicly named, this fax also served the Düsseldorf district court as proof that there is definitely a connection between Hopp and the people's mission.

In 2012, the Krefeld public prosecutor's office started investigations against Hopp for aiding and abetting sexual abuse and assault. "The investigation is also very difficult because many victims are not interested in clarification. One of the principles of the Colonia Dignidad was that everyone should forgive everyone. This principle applies to many former members to this day,” said the investigating officer in 2013 about the Hopp case.

In 2015, the proceedings against Hartmut Hopp in Germany took another hurdle. The Chilean government agreed that Hopp would be tried in Germany and sent a comprehensive response letter to the Federal Ministry of Justice in May 2015 . On this basis, the Chilean judgment could have been enforced in Germany as part of an exequatur procedure.

One of the victims of these practices, Gudrun Müller, said in 2014 about Hopp's role in Colonia: "Yes, he [claims he] is like us: a victim. He never was, not even when he was young. He was never a victim."

On July 4, 2017, ARD reported again in the TV magazine Fakt about Colonia Dignidad and Hopp, who continues to live in Krefeld.

On November 21, 2017, Fakt accused Hartmut Hopp of wrongly receiving social assistance from the Krefeld social welfare office because he owned a valuable piece of land of over 10,000 square meters in Chile. The questioned Hopp was not ready to comment.

At the end of September 2018, the 3rd Criminal Senate of the Düsseldorf Higher Regional Court decided, as the last instance, with a view to the 2017 decision of the Krefeld Regional Court that the Chilean judgment against Hopp was not enforceable in Germany. It is not sufficient to establish criminal liability under German law. The Chilean judgment included aiding and abetting rape of minors in four cases. Hopp had therefore been sentenced to a little over five years in prison.

In May 2019 it became known that the Krefeld public prosecutor had closed the investigation against Hopp. She said that numerous witnesses (some in Chile) had been heard and that all promising investigative approaches had been exhausted. Those affected stated that their confidence in the German judiciary had been shaken.

Petra Schlagenhauf, a lawyer for the victims, criticized that many of the witnesses she had named had never been heard. In January 2021, she therefore filed an application for enforcement proceedings with the Düsseldorf Higher Regional Court. The European Center for Constitutional and Human Rights (ECCHR) filed supervisory complaints with the North Rhine-Westphalian Ministry of Justice in February 2021 to clear the way for further investigations.

== Public ==
After Hopp and other responsible persons escaped, human rights organizations drew attention to the fugitives and their actions. In a press conference of the human rights organization European Center for Constitutional and Human Rights, the lawyer Petra Schlagenhauf reported on the evidence she had given about abuse, murders and mass executions on the grounds of Colonia Dignidad. In 2011, ECCHR was able to report three murders in which the acts of violence could largely be proven. With the complaint, the lawyers wanted to increase the pressure on the German authorities to take action. For this purpose, ECCHR created a 30-page dossier on Hartmut Hopp and the Colonia Dignidad. The first criminal complaint that ECCHR filed in this complex was directed against Hopp. In the dossier, the ECCHR authors go into detail about Hopp's leadership role and his responsibility as head of the Colonia Dignidad hospital from 1978 onwards.

== Literature ==
- Friedrich Paul Heller : Colonia Dignidad. From the psycho sect to the torture camp. Butterfly, Stuttgart 1993, ISBN 3-926369-99-X .
- Friedrich Paul Heller: Lederhosen, bun and poison gas. The background of the Colonia Dignidad. Butterfly, Stuttgart 2011, 4th expanded edition, ISBN 3-89657-096-X .
- Klaus Schnellenkamp: Born in the shadow of fear: I survived the Colonia Dignidad . Herbig Verlag, Munich 2007, ISBN 978-3-7766-2505-9
- Colonia Dignidad, ECCHR statement on Hopp, October 6, 2011
