= Orly (film) =

- Theatrical Release Poster
- Directed by: Angela Schanelec
- Written by: Angela Schanelec
- Produced by: Christophe Delsaux; Céline Maugis; Gian-Piero Ringel; Angela Schanelec
- Starring: Natacha Régnier; Bruno Todeschini; Maren Eggert; Josse De Pauw; Mireille Perrier; Émile Berling; Jirka Zett; Lina Phyllis Falconer
- Cinematography: Reinhold Vorschneider
- Edited by: Mathilde Bonnefoy
- Distributed by: Piffl Medien and Baba Yaga Distribution
- Release date: February 13, 2010
- Running time: 84 min
- Countries: Germany, France
- Languages: German, French, English

Orly is a 2010 German and French film on location in Orly Airport directed by Angela Schanelec. The film had its world premiere at the Berlin International Film Festival on February 13, 2010 and went to screen at the Los Angeles Film Festival later that year. During production, the film's working title was Orly, Poem 1-4. Just a week after the theatrical release of Germany 09, a compilation film about the state of the nation in which Schanelec contributed one of the 13 short films, production began on location at the Orly Airport on January 4, 2009 and lasted through the end of the month.

== Plot ==
Composed as two hours in the life of the Orly Airport, Orly follows four characters who are waiting for their respective flights in the same terminal. On the way home to her husband, a young woman named Juliette falls in love with a stranger named Vincent. An unnamed mother accompanies her son to the funeral of his father as they share intimate secrets about their lives in the ambient bustle of the terminal. A young couple on their first big trip sees the fabric of their relationship begin to fray as bodies move around them. Meanwhile, Sabine dares only in the anonymity of the public to read the farewell letter of her husband, Theo.

== Cast ==
- Natacha Régnier : Juliette
- Bruno Todeschini : Vincent
- Mireille Perrier : Mother
- Émile Berling : Son
- Jirka Zett : Young Man
- Lina Phyllis Falconer : His Girlfriend
- Maren Eggert : Sabine
- Josse De Pauw : Theo

== Reception ==
Following the release of the film, Orly gained a generally positive response from critics. In Libération, Gérard Lefort wrote, "Jacques Tati said: 'I never get bored while waiting for a plane in an airport.' Angela Schanelec has taken up this conviction on her own by installing her new film at Orly Airport," while in Filmdienst, Horst Peter Koll warmly regarded it, "With impressive stylistic certainty, poetic, unobtrusive, full of sympathy for the characters." Though by 2017, opinions seemed to have shifted, as Blake Williams noted in CinemaScope Magazine, "Schanelec’s Orly—a film that seems to have been taken up as the consensus pick for her weakest effort—feels more like a schematic exercise than a major work."
