= Devid Striesow =

German actor (born 1973)

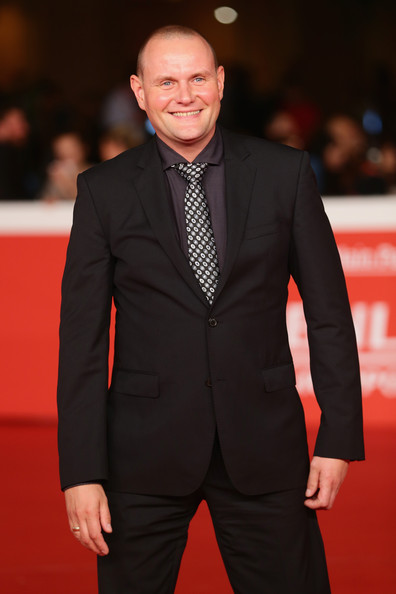
Devid Striesow

Devid Striesow (born 1 October 1973 in Bergen auf Rügen, East Germany) is a German actor.

After his school education, he moved to Berlin to start an apprenticeship as a goldsmith but the goldsmith's business went bankrupt before Striesow could start. The fall of the Berlin Wall in 1989 changed his life plans, so he went back to school to take his Abitur. Initially, he studied jazz guitar. He then applied to the Ernst Busch Academy of Dramatic Arts, Berlin. His graduating class of 1999 included Nina Hoss and Fritzi Haberlandt.

He performs in theatre, film (since 2000) and television (since 1999). He starred as "Sturmbannführer Herzog" (Bernhard Krüger) in Stefan Ruzowitzky's 2007 film The Counterfeiters, which was awarded the Academy Award for Best Foreign Language Film for that year. Striesow is also a speaker for audiobooks.

Striesow has been married to his manager Ines Ganzberger since 2018. They are parents to a son (born 2016) and live in Berlin. His son Ludwig Simon (born 1996) from a previous relationship with actress Maria Simon is also an actor. There are three other children from a previous marriage.

== Selected filmography ==
Film
Year	Title	Role	Notes
2001	Ende der Saison	Marius Wahls	TV film
2001	What to Do in Case of Fire?	Henkel	
2002	Bungalow	Max	
2003	Distant Lights	Ingo	
2004	Marseille	Ivan	
2004	Before the Fall	Feldwebel	
2004	Downfall	Fritz Tornow	
2005	I Am Guilty	Matin Steeb, Jr.	
2006	Windows on Monday	Fenstermacher	
2006	Eden	Xaver	
2007	Yella	Philipp	
2007	The Counterfeiters	Sturmbannführer Herzog	
2007	Ein verlockendes Angebot	Jan Werther	TV film
2007	Head Under Water	Richard Sammer	
2007	Copacabana	Mark Schubert	TV film
2007	The Heart Is a Dark Forest	Thomas	
2009	I've Never Been Happier	Frank Knöpfel	
2009	12 Paces Without a Head	Simon of Utrecht	
2009	Vision	Frederick Barbarossa	
2009	This Is Love	Roland	
2010	Relations	Philipp Schneider	TV film
2010	Three	Adam	
2011	A Good Summer	Wilfried Gross	TV film
2011	Ein mörderisches Geschäft	Tom Winkler	TV film
2012	Foreign Deployment	Herbert Glowalla	TV film
2013	The Woman from the Past	Frank	TV film
2014	Age of Cannibals	Frank Öllers	
2014	Divine Sparks	Matthias Fabian	TV film
2014	Kafka's The Burrow	Handwerker	
2014	We Are Young. We Are Strong	Martin	
2014	Till Eulenspiegel	Klaas Wüllenwever	TV film
2015	A Decent Man	Thomas	
2015	I'm Off Then	Hape Kerkeling	
2017	Luther and I	Martin Luther	TV film
2017	Mademoiselle Paradis (Licht)	Franz Mesmer	
2022	All Quiet on the Western Front	General Friedrichs	
2023	When Will It Be Again Like It Never Was Before	Richard Meyerhoff	
2026	Fatherland		
2026	Eat Pray Bark		

TV-Series
Year	Title	Role	Notes
1999–2000	Für alle Fälle Stefanie		Two episodes
2008	Dr. Psycho – Die Bösen, die Bullen, meine Frau und ich		Episode: "Der doppelte Psycho"
2011	Der Kriminalist		Episode: "Der Beschützer"
2011	Schloss Einstein		One episode
2011, 2014	The Old Fox		Two episodes
2013	Großstadtrevier		Episode: "Wer einmal zahlt, zahlt immer"
2015	Schuld nach Ferdinand von Schirach		Episode: "Der Andere"
2019–20	Dignity	Bernard Hausmann	Main role
