= Colonia Dignidad =

Secretive colony founded by Germans in Chile, formerly torture center

- Sect's operation space, with overlapping use as concentration and torture camp by DINA
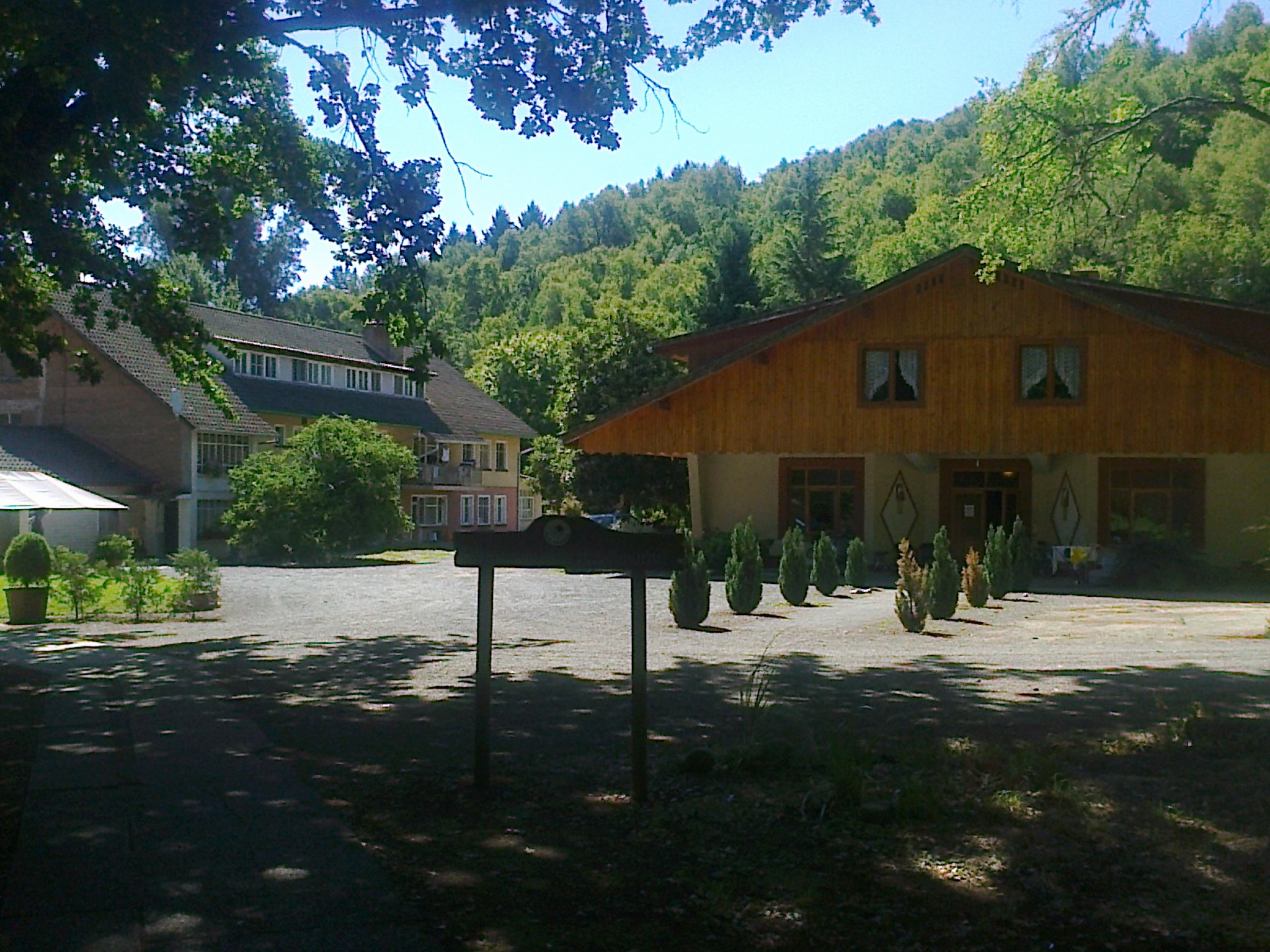
- Hotel Villa Baviera in February 2014

- Location of Colonia Dignidad (now Villa Baviera) in Chile
- Coordinates: 36°23′13″S 71°35′17″W
- Other names: Villa Baviera
- Known for: Internment and murder of dissidents during Pinochet's military dictatorship
- Location: 35 km east of Parral, Linares Province, Maule Region, Chile
- Built by: Paul Schäfer's sect
- Operated by: Paul Schäfer
- Commandant: Paul Schäfer
- First built: 1961
- Operational: 1961–2007 (as sect's operation place); 1973–1985 (as concentration camp of Pinochet's dissidents)
- Killed: unknown
- Notable inmates: Boris Weisfeiler (alleged)
- Notable books: Das Blendwerk: Von der "Colonia Dignidad" zur "Villa Baviera"

Colonia Dignidad (Spanish pronunciation: [koˈlonja ðiɣniˈðað]; lit. 'Dignity Colony') was an isolated colony established in post-World War II Chile by emigrant Germans which became notorious for the internment, torture, and murder of dissidents during the military dictatorship of General Augusto Pinochet in the 1970s while under the leadership of German emigrant preacher Paul Schäfer. Colonia Dignidad has been described as a "state within a state".

Schäfer and members of the colony were deeply religious and followed the teachings of William Branham. The main legal economic activity of the colony was agriculture; at various periods it also was home to a school, a hospital, two airstrips, a restaurant, and a power station.

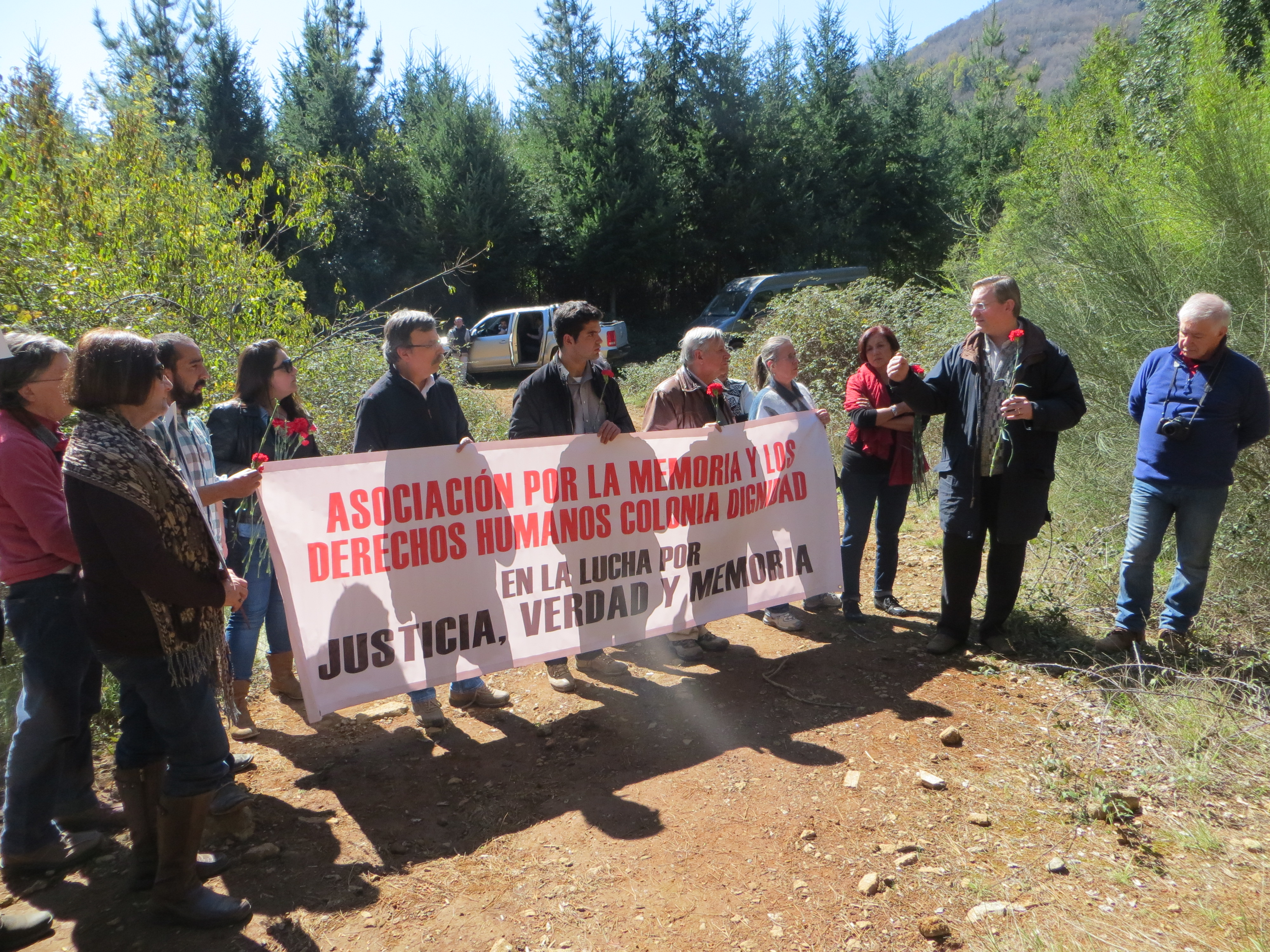
Protesters asking for justice in 2015

Colonia Dignidad's longest continuous leader, Paul Schäfer, arrived in the colony in 1961. Schäfer was a fugitive, accused of child molestation in West Germany. The organization he led in Chile was described, alternatively, as a cult or as a group of "harmless eccentrics". The organization was secretive, and the Colonia was surrounded by barbed wire fences, featured a watchtower and searchlights, and was later reported to contain secret weapon caches. External investigations, including efforts by the Chilean government, uncovered a history of criminal activity in the enclave, including child sexual abuse. Reports from Chile's National Commission for Truth and Reconciliation indicate that a small set of the many individuals abducted by Pinochet's Dirección de Inteligencia Nacional during his rule were held as prisoners at Colonia Dignidad, most of whom were subjected to torture, and often to extrajudicial execution as well. Several members of Colonia's leadership of the time, including Schäfer, were participants in the atrocities.

In 1991, the name of the settlement was changed to Villa Baviera. After Schäfer fled to Argentina in 1996 to escape child molestation charges in Chile, control over residents loosened. Residents of the colony are now free to leave, and the site is open for tourism.

== Location ==
Located in a remote area in the Maule Region of central Chile, Colonia Dignidad was located in the commune of Parral, in a rural area on the north bank of the Perquilauquén River, about 35 km southeast of the town of Parral. The full name of the colony from the 1960s was Sociedad Benefactora y Educacional Dignidad ("Charitable and Educational Society 'Dignity' "). Starting with the purchase of a 3,062-hectare (7,566-acre) ranch in 1961, Colonia Dignidad would eventually grow to about 13,700 hectares (33,900 acres) and, at its largest, was home to some three hundred German and Chilean residents.

== History ==
The first inhabitants of Colonia Dignidad arrived in 1961, brought by German citizen Paul Schäfer. Born in 1921 in the town of Troisdorf, Schäfer's first employment in Germany was as a welfare worker for children in an institution of the local church. He was fired from that post at the end of the 1940s and faced accusations of sexual abuse against children in his care. While these first reports led to his dismissal, no criminal proceedings were initiated.

Schäfer had been following the ministry of William Branham from Germany, and was very excited when Branham made a personal visit to Germany in 1955. Schäfer and other members of his church served as William Branham's personal security detail on his 1955 European tour. One sermon, during his visit to Karlsruhe, left a deep impression on Schäfer. Schäfer claimed to experience a healing in the meeting, and thereafter began to strongly teach some of Branham's key doctrines. Following the 1955 meetings with Branham, Schäfer began to put more of William Branham's doctrines into practice in his group, and began to insist to his followers that they were the "only faithful ones" to William Branham's teachings.

"Strong ties were forged" between Schäfer, William Branham, and Ewald Frank during Branham's time in Germany. Schäfer may have been influenced to move to Chile by Branham's doomsday prophesies that predicted the imminent destruction of western democracies. Schäfer continued to promote Branham's teaching throughout his life, and many escapees and the current members of Colonia are still affiliated with the teachings of Branham.

Ewald Frank was a key figure in helping Colonia establish its weapons factories by contracting with German arms producers to assist the colony in setting up their operations. Frank also played a role in assisting in the sale and transport of the materials and supplies for the operations in Colonia. When investigations were launched into Colonia in later years, many members of the colony fled back to Germany where they found refuge with Frank. Schäfer maintained connections to Branham until the latter's death in a car accident in 1965.

=== Allegations against the colony ===
To the outside world, the colony portrayed itself as an example of German efficiency, cleanliness and communal work. The profitable agricultural production and an attached charity hospital helped preserve this image for a long time. The colony had its own press operations, which recorded and broadcast videos showing their happy residents amid celebrations, men doing farm work, and women and girls embroidering and preparing butter. In 1981, a Chilean film crew was invited by Schäfer to record what life at the colony was supposedly like for a newsreel, which included footage of happy working citizens and musical performances. Diplomats at the German embassy ignored reports of the violence and crime and praised it as a “model colony”.

However, Schäfer's propaganda efforts were again and again overshadowed by allegations of people escaping from the colony and obtaining asylum in Germany. The earliest known example was Wolfgang Müller, who fled in 1966 and first exposed the atrocities that occurred within the colony. Müller obtained German citizenship and worked for a newspaper, soon becoming an activist in Germany against the leaders of Colonia Dignidad. He eventually became the president of a foundation dedicated to the support of Schäfer's victims in Chile.

In 1967, Schäfer freed another inhabitant of the colony, Heinz Kuhn, who confirmed the allegations previously made by Müller, and provided more information on abuses. However, these first allegations were rejected by politicians and were emphatically denied due to their ties with the management of the Colony in their preparation of the military coup of September 11, 1973, as demonstrated later in Chilean court cases.

In 1988, Georg and Lotti Packmor escaped and testified in a parliamentary hearing in Bonn, Germany, that German citizens were forced to live in the enclave against their will.

=== Secret detention camp ===
Before officially moving his organization to Chile, Paul Schäfer requested that the Chilean government exempt him from paying taxes and grant him asylum as long as he helped with gaining political intelligence. Several years later, the Rettig Commission noted a wealth of information supporting the accusations of the use of the land owned by Colonia Dignidad for detention and torture of political detainees during Pinochet's military dictatorship. Among these sources are spokesmen for the Government of the Federal Republic of Germany, and the Working Group on Enforced or Involuntary Disappearances. The Rettig Commission ultimately based its conclusions on evidence that it examined directly.

In these underground prisons, the captives were tortured in numerous ways, including mutilation from dogs and electric shocks. Some torture victims allege that Schäfer was directly involved in their torture. There is speculation that the extent of Schäfer's involvement with Pinochet has not yet been fully disclosed. Schäfer's 2005 arrest saw more than 500 government files of missing detainees hidden in the bodega de las papas (potato cellar in English). Each of these files contained details of severe human rights violations committed under Schäfer's supervision in collaboration with Pinochet. In the late 1970s, Pinochet allegedly ordered the mass graves containing hundreds of murdered detainees to be unearthed and the bodies either thrown into the sea or burned.

=== Claims of German Intelligence Service assistance ===
Journalist John Dinges has suggested that there was some degree of cooperation between the German Intelligence Service, German arms dealer Gerhard Mertins, and Colonia Dignidad, including creation of bunkers, tunnels, a hospital, and runways for the decentralized production of armaments in modules (parts produced in one place, other parts in another). This subject was proactively hidden, because of the problems experienced at the time associated with Argentina.

=== Army base ===
Because of Colonia Dignidad's close association with the Chilean military and strategic proximity to the Argentina–Chile border, the Colonia served as a base for the Chilean military during the 1978 Beagle conflict between Chile and Argentina. The hospital at Colonia Dignidad also served as a laboratory for the manufacture of weaponized sarin as part of the Pinochet government's Project Andrea.

=== Democratic transition ===
Chile turned to democracy in 1990 after 17 years of dictatorship, but Colonia Dignidad remained unchanged. Allegations of abuses and humiliations that occurred inside the colony increased. National and international pressure intensified, but each time the police tried to conduct an investigation at the site they were greeted with a wall of silence. Colonia Dignidad authorities remained powerful and also had allies in the army and among the Chilean far right, who would warn them in advance when the police were preparing to visit the site.

Slowly, Chilean public awareness began to change, creating a growing feeling of resentment towards the place, which many began to perceive as an independent state, or an enclave within Chile.

== Life under Schäfer’s leadership ==
Before coming to Chile, Schäfer had attempted to start an orphanage in Germany, but two mothers living there accused him of molesting their children, so to escape judicial consequences, he fled to Chile. Schäfer arrived in Chile in 1961 with around 70 followers, and a number of kidnapped children. The colony continued to 'import' children from Germany and the surrounding areas until the end of Schäfer's leadership. Colonia Dignidad grew to have about 350 people, including around 100 children. Those on the side of the colony said that it was a harmless organization, but those against it described it as tyrannical in structure and highly restrictive in terms of interaction between genders and in expression of sexuality, with a reportedly aging population. The perimeter of the colony was made up of barbed wire, searchlights, and a watchtower. Today the colony is not as isolated as it was under Schäfer's leadership; Schäfer made great efforts to keep the colony as isolated as he could. The road to the colony cut through farmland and forest, and brought the traveler to a large barbed-wire fence that was generally heavily protected. Inside, however, the colony seemed fairly normal, though a bit old-fashioned:

The village had modern apartment complexes, two schools, a chapel, several meetinghouses, and a bakery that produced fresh cakes, breads, and cheeses. There were numerous animal stables, two landing strips, at least one airplane, a hydroelectric power station, and mills and factories of various kinds, including a highly profitable gravel mill that supplied raw materials for numerous road-building projects throughout Chile. On the north side of the village was a hospital, where the Germans provided free care to thousands of patients in one of the country's poorest areas.

Schäfer, despite living in Chile for most of his adult life, spoke little Spanish, as only German was spoken inside the colony. He was described as having a very serious demeanor, and rarely smiled, but was considered to be quite charismatic nonetheless. He made great efforts to illustrate Colonia Dignidad as a utopian paradise, seemingly frozen in a time before World War II. In reality, Schäfer ran a fear-based colony where members were barred from interacting with the world outside the community, and a few were armed to protect the community against possible outside attacks. The inhabitants lived under an abnormal authoritarian system, where in addition to minimal contact with the outside, Schäfer ordered the division of families (children did not talk to their parents, or did not know their siblings). It prohibited all kinds of relations, sentimental or conjugal, among adult women and men, and segregated the living quarters by sex. Schäfer sexually abused children and some were tortured, as is clear from the statements of the German Dr. Gisela Seewald, who admitted the use of electroshock therapy and sedatives that her boss had claimed were placebos. Members were often encouraged to confess to Schäfer both their own sins and the sins of others that they had witnessed. Supposed sinners were often publicly outed and shamed during gathering times and meals. Women were thought to be inherently sinful, plagued by sexuality, which was the justification behind separating the men from the women.

Schäfer often dictated the formation of romantic relationships, such as deciding when people could get married and have children. Most of the time, however, conceptions of the family inside the colony were based not on genetics, but on loyalty to Schäfer, who self-identified as "The Permanent Uncle." When children were born, they would be raised by nurses in groups segregated by sex rather than their biological parents. Males would initially be placed in a group called "The Babies", then advance to "The Wedges" by age 6, "The Army of Salvation" by 15, "The Elder Servants" by the mid-30s, and lastly, "The Comalos" by 50. Females were divided into "The Dragons," "The Field Mice," "The Women's Group," and "The Grannies" at the same respective ages. This was done in an effort to give everyone an exact role in the colony's order. Group members shared living spaces of about six to one room, and all wore similar German 30s-style clothing. Each person would work 12+ hours a day, receiving no payment, but doing so rather for the sake of Colonia Dignidad.

The colony had a school and hospital in the enclave which offered support to rural families through free education and health services. This would, ultimately, create support in case the colony was attacked. However, there are many cases uncovered in recent years that refer to illegal adoptions of children from families residing in the surrounding areas by the German hierarchy in order to deliver on the promise of free education. Locals around the colony generally knew Colonia Dignidad to be made up of hygienic, hard-working individuals who led a very structured life.

== Atrocities ==
=== Sexual abuse ===
In 1996, Schäfer fled child sex abuse charges in Chile, escaping arrest until 2005. The previous year, in his absence, a Chilean court had convicted him of child abuse, together with 26 other cult members. In 2006, he was sentenced to 20 years in prison. He died in prison of a heart ailment, on 24 April 2010, at the age of 88. At the time of his death, he was still under investigation for the 1985 disappearance of mathematician Boris Weisfeiler, an American citizen who went missing while hiking near Colonia Dignidad.

=== Torture and murder ===
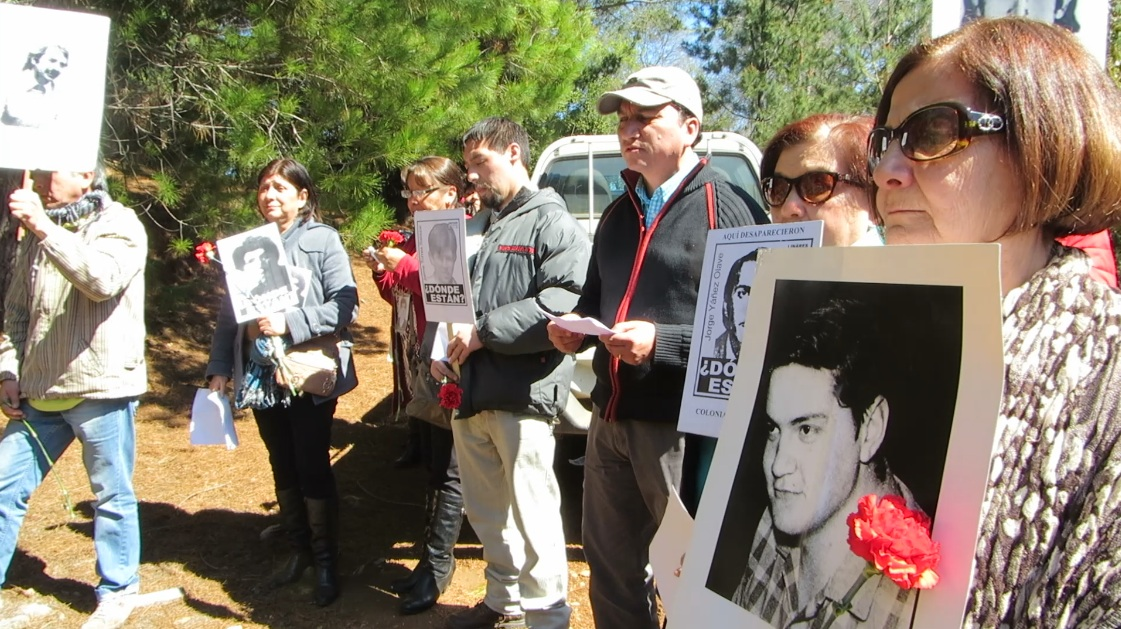
Families of disappeared people

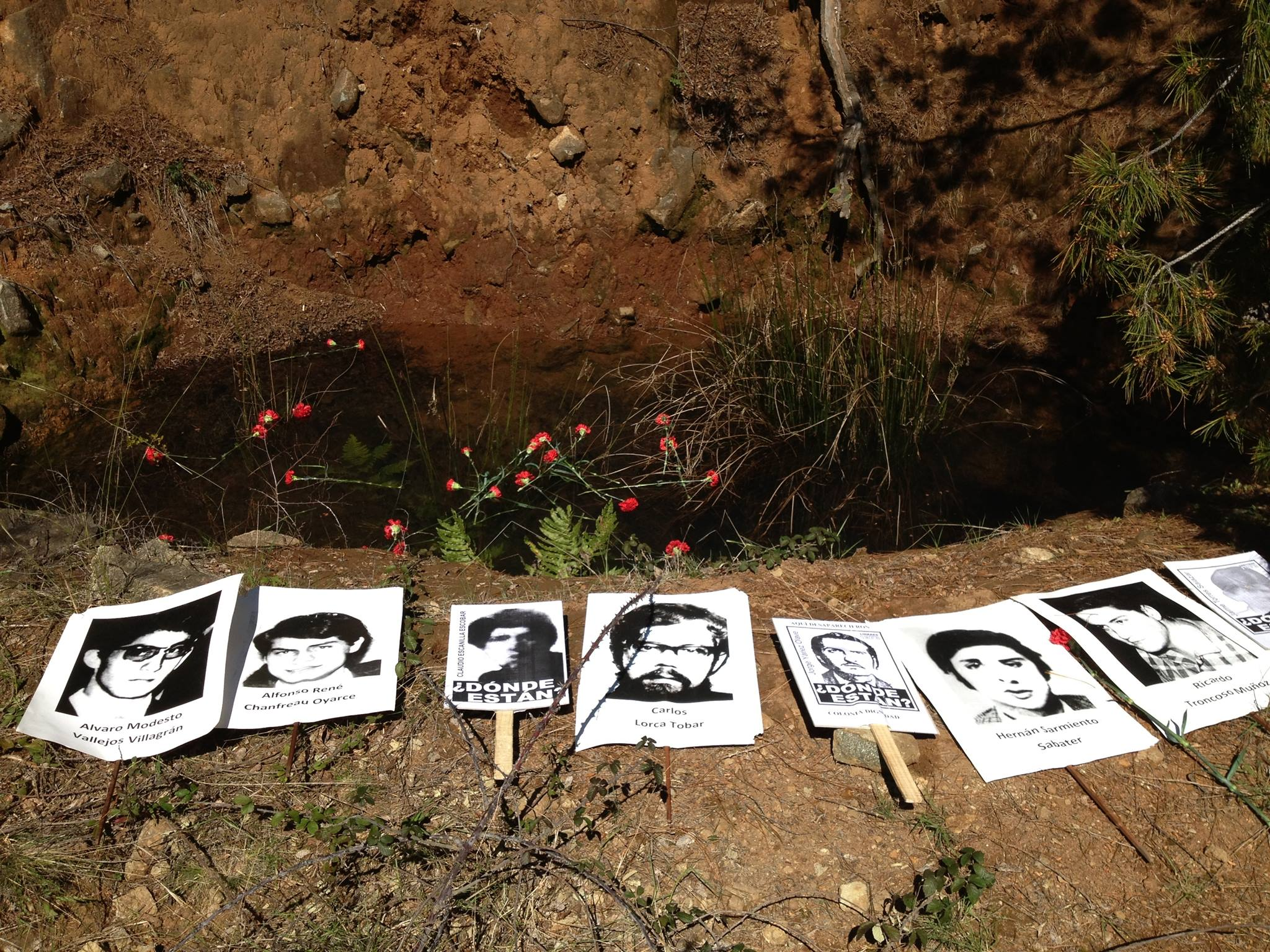
The grave where the bodies of murdered detainees were buried and later exhumed from

During the military dictatorship of Augusto Pinochet, from 1973 to 1990, Colonia Dignidad served as a special torture center. In 1991, Chile's Rettig Report concluded that a number of people apprehended by the DINA were held at Colonia Dignidad, and that some of the colony's residents actively helped the DINA torture some of the captives. Colonia Dignidad's involvement came to light as early as an October 1976 report from the United Nations Ad Hoc Working Group on Chile, as referenced in a March 1977 Amnesty International report, "Disappeared Prisoners in Chile", with the latter report describing the evidence in this way:

Another DINA detention center described in the [U.N.] document, in which it is alleged that experiments in torture are carried out, is Colonia Dignidad, near the town of Parral…

Prisoners being tortured in the tunnels under Colonia Dignidad were each interrogated to gain an understanding of their personality in order to gauge the appropriate torture technique. These techniques led to a number of afflictions lasting indeterminate periods of time. As many as 100 of the citizens taken to Colonia Dignidad by the DINA were murdered at the colony.

There are more than 1,100 desaparecidos (disappeared people) in Chile, some taken to the Colony where they were tortured and killed. One of them is a U.S. citizen, Boris Weisfeiler, a Soviet-born mathematics professor at Pennsylvania State University. Weisfeiler, then 43 years old, vanished while on a hiking trip near the border between Chile and Argentina in the early part of January 1985. It is presumed that Weisfeiler had been kidnapped and taken to the Colony where he was tortured and killed. In 2012, a judge in Chile ordered the arrest of eight former police and army officials over the kidnapping of Weisfeiler during the Pinochet years, citing evidence from declassified US files. In 2016, the case was closed and the men were freed when a judge ruled that Weisfeiler had indeed been abducted, but that it was only a common crime, long past the statute of limitations, instead of a human rights violation.

=== Member abuse ===
Some defectors from the colony have portrayed it as a cult in which the leader Paul Schäfer held the ultimate power. They claim that the residents were never allowed to leave the colony, and that they were strictly segregated by gender. Television, telephones and calendars were banned. Residents worked wearing Bavarian peasant garb and sang German folk songs. Sex was banned, with some residents forced to take drugs to reduce their desires. Drugs were also administered as a form of sedation, mostly to young girls, but to males as well. Severe discipline in the forms of beatings and torture was commonplace: Schäfer insisted that discipline was spiritually enriching. One of the first instances of abuse allegations was in 1966 from escapee Wolfgang Müller, who had been sixteen when he came to the colony. He claimed that he was forced into slave labor, received regular harsh beatings, and was molested by Schäfer on multiple occasions. Müller said that former Nazis were part of the colony as well.

=== Weapons violations ===
In June and July 2005, Chilean police found two large illegal arms caches in or around the colony. The first, within the colony itself, included three containers with machine guns, automatic rifles, rocket launchers, and large quantities of ammunition, some as many as forty years old but with evidence of recent maintenance. This cache was described as the largest arsenal ever found in private hands in Chile. The second cache, outside a restaurant operated by the colony, included rocket launchers and grenades.

In January 2005, former Chilean secret police operative Michael Townley, then living in the United States under a witness-protection program, acknowledged to agents of Interpol Chile links between DINA and Colonia Dignidad. Townley also revealed information about Colonia Dignidad and the army's Laboratory on Bacteriological Warfare. This last laboratory would have replaced the old DINA laboratory at Vía Naranja de Lo Curro hill, where Townley worked with the chemist Eugenio Berríos. Townley also gave proof of biological experiments, related to the two aforementioned laboratories, on political prisoners at Colonia Dignidad.

=== Nazi ties ===
The Central Intelligence Agency and Simon Wiesenthal claim that Josef Mengele, the infamous Nazi concentration camp doctor, known as the "Angel of Death" for his lethal experiments on human subjects, was present at the colony. The colony itself rejected the accusation when Wiesenthal published it in 1997 in the Chilean press. Around that same time (in 2001), the German government stated that there was "no evidence to support or invalidate Wiesenthal's claim or the more general allegation that the Colonia Dignidad or its legal successors was a place of refuge for Nazi criminals.”

The Nazi underground in South America was established some time before World War II. Juan Perón provided shelter to some escaped Nazi criminals. Nazi sympathy in South America decreased until Pinochet took power.

The high concentration of Germans in Chile shaped the country's overall attitude towards subjects like education and military. A few of the Germans who immigrated to Chile in the 1960s were former Nazis led by Paul Schäfer. Colonia Dignidad was a “Nazi stronghold protected by the Chilean government[...].” Former members of the SS and Gestapo had the job of demonstrating Nazi torture methods to the secret police of Chile. Many of Schäfer's followers who had Nazi pasts joined him to escape post-World War II war crime investigations. The presence of Colonia Dignidad had an effect on the general political opinion of the surrounding areas, and the government as well because of this, considering the political ties between Colonia Dignidad and the Chilean government.

== Legal proceedings ==
In 2004, a Chilean court convicted Schäfer and 26 other cult members of child abuse. In 2006, Schäfer was sentenced to 20 years in prison.

In early 2011, Hartmut Hopp, considered to be Schäfer's "right-hand-man" at Colonia Dignidad, was placed under house arrest in Chile while awaiting trial for human rights crimes. In May 2011, Hopp fled Chile on board a helicopter, later making his way to Germany. In June 2016, prosecutors in Germany petitioned a court to enforce a 5-year prison sentence that Hopp was sentenced to in absentia in Chile. In May 2019, German prosecutors announced that they had dropped their investigation into Hopp and Reinhard Döring. In January 2020, a lawyer for the victims, Petra Schlagenhauf, lodged a complaint seeking to have the investigation reopened.

Hopp and other alleged accomplices in Schäfer's crimes who were charged and awaiting trial took refuge in Ewald Frank's church in Germany, where they were protected from extradition. Frank is a leader of William Branham's followers in Germany. German protestors picketed in front of Frank's church to protest his actions. The government of Chile banned Ewald Frank from entering the country after finding he had been visiting and holding revival meetings with Schäfer's followers at Colonia. Schäfer's followers speculated to news reporters that Frank and Schäfer had known each other since the 1950s when they were both at Branham's European campaign meetings together.

At the time that Hopp fled Chile, 10 other cult members were out on bail awaiting trial on various charges. Fearing that they would also flee the country, their bail was immediately revoked and they were taken into custody.

In 2010, Chilean authorities opened an investigation into the events occurring in the colony during the 1990s, resulting 19 months later in the Supreme Court issuing a unanimous ruling to prosecute 16 Chilean and German members of the colony. On 28 January 2013, six former leaders of the colony were sentenced to prison, while the remaining 10 were found guilty of lesser crimes and given probationary sentences.

In March 2017, the German Bundestag officially acknowledged the responsibility of Germany and the failure of the German foreign policy regarding the Colonia Dignidad and members of all the parties in the German parliament passed a resolution giving the government a year to come up with plans to investigate the history of the colony, establish a memorial, and offer assistance to victims and family members.

== Villa Baviera era ==
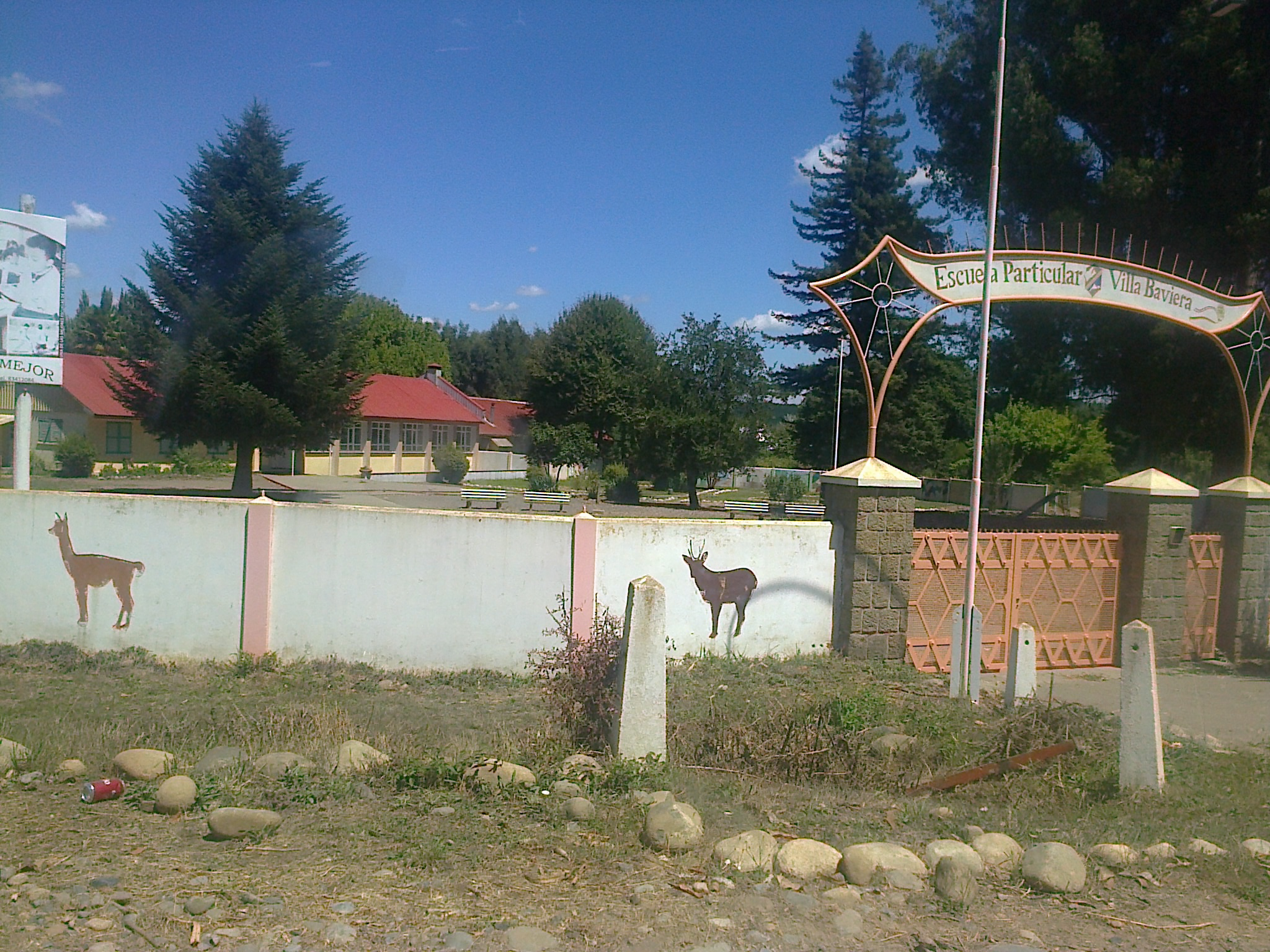
School

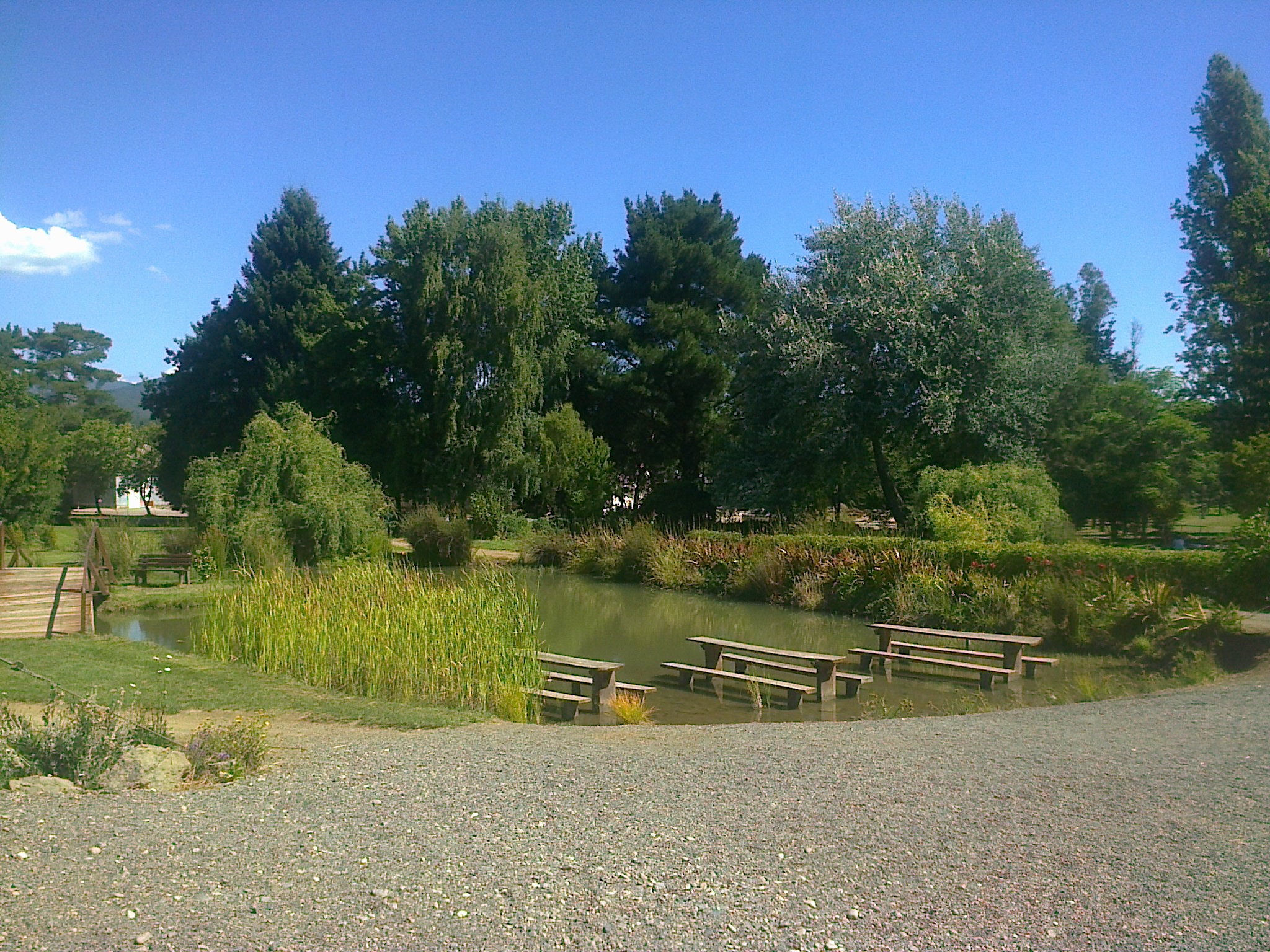
Laguna

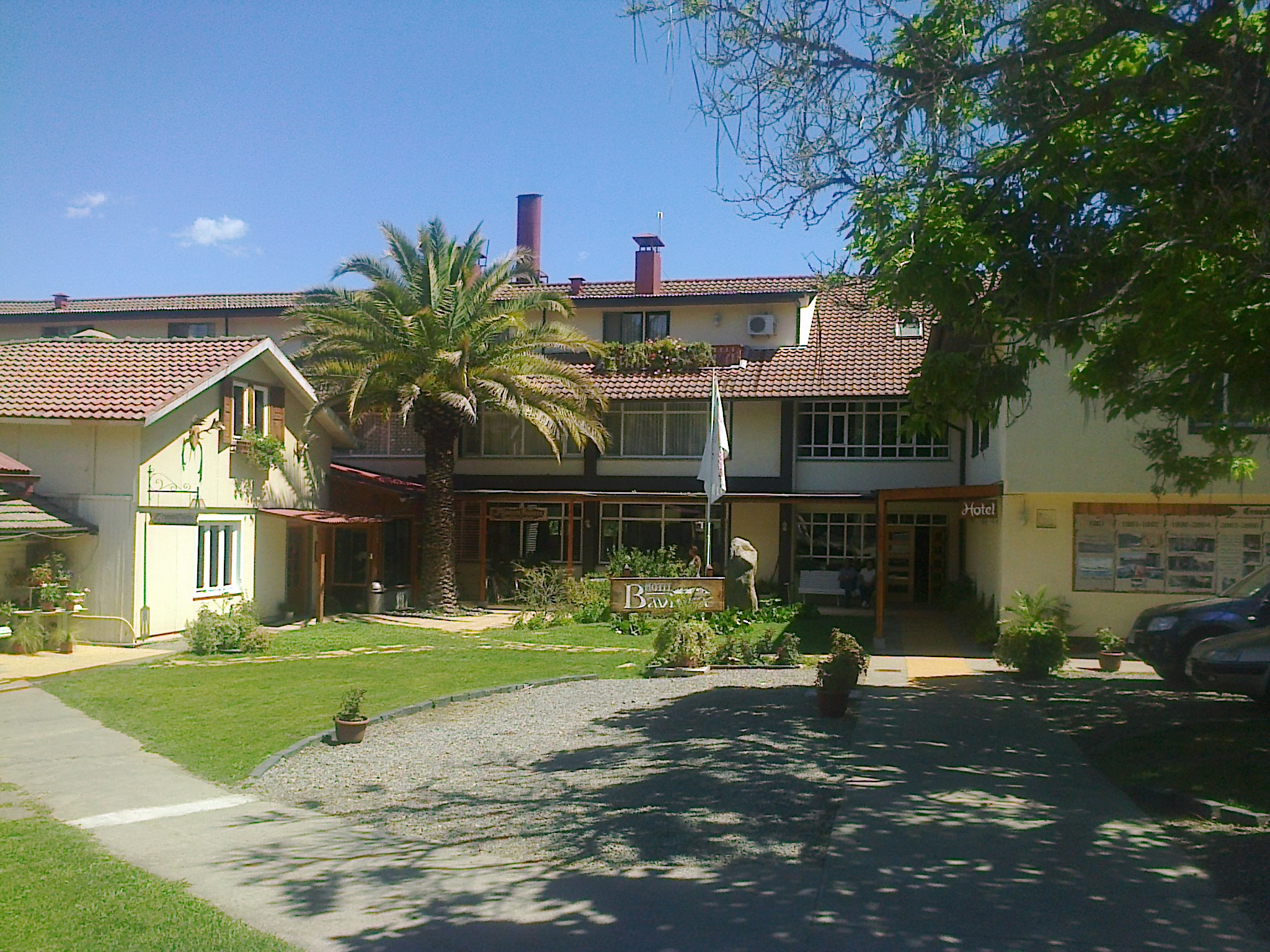
Hotel

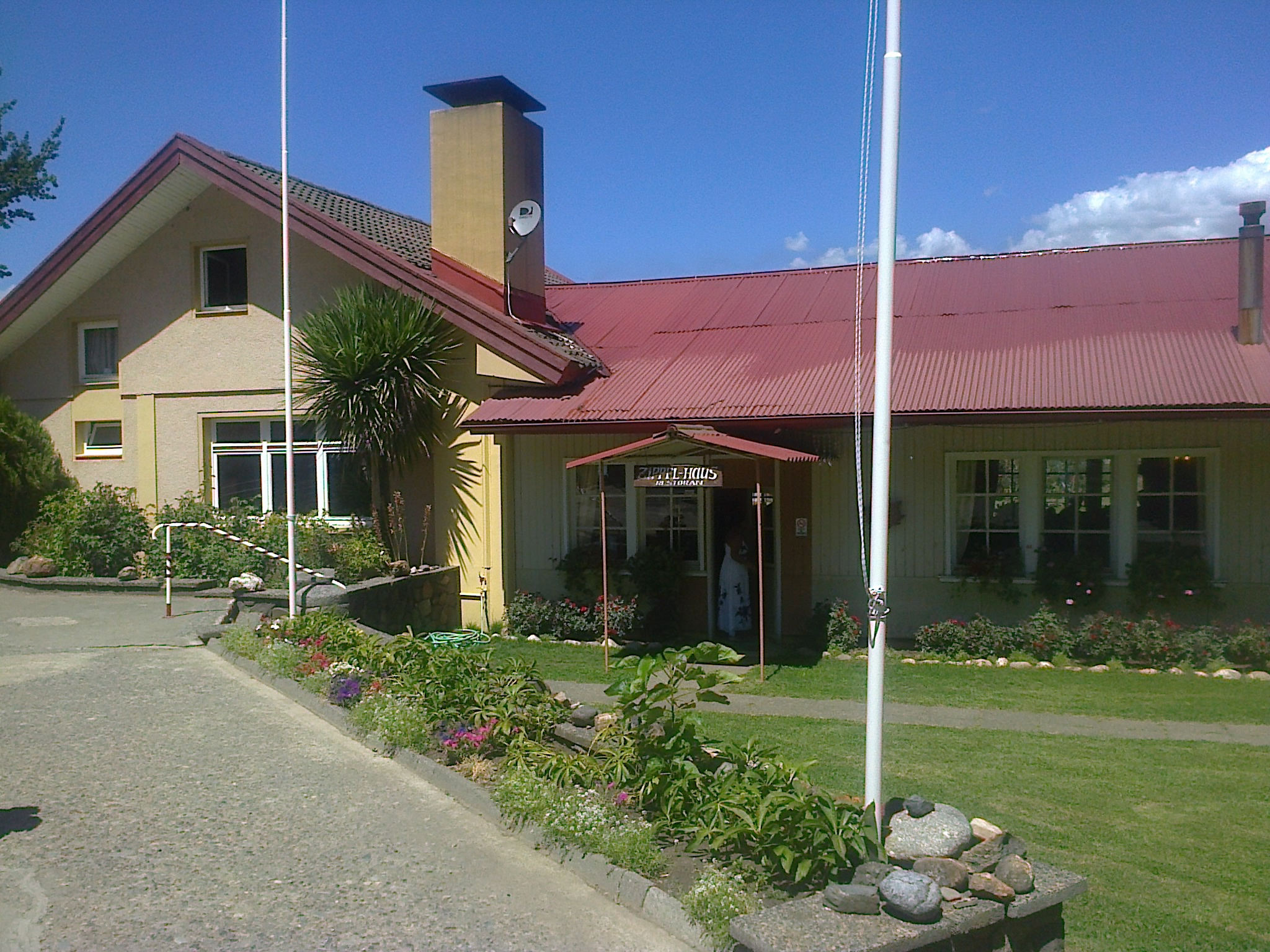
Restaurant

In 1991, the name of the settlement was changed to "Villa Baviera". Residents of the colony are now allowed free ingress and egress, and some study at university. As of 2019 Villa Baviera is operated as a tourist resort, something that has been the subject of controversy from human rights activists.

When the transition of the colony first started, many of the former victims protested in front of the "Villa Baviera", attached photos of the murdered and disappeared on the fence and compared the use of the former torture site to "installing a McDonald's in Auschwitz".

In October 2005, the Chilean government sent a team of coordinators to the colony whose task it was to make sure the inhabitants would be fully integrated into Chilean society. Their main advice was to modernize the estate, so the inhabitants could gain their livelihood within the premises. One of the ideas was to turn the facilities into a "wellness-farm with hot springs and organic yoghurt production".

== Memorial ==
Survivors and a majority of German and Chilenian citizens were positive about a memorial and a memorial center to display the crimes of Colognia Dignidad at the former ground. This memorial has been the subject of controversy for years.

In 2025, the Chilenian Ministry of Justice announced plans to expropriate approximately 116 hectares for this purpose. In 2026 Chile's right-wing government under President José Antonio Kast intends to halt the planned expropriation of land for a memorial on the grounds of the former German sect Colonia Dignidad. The project was intended to commemorate the victims of serious crimes. Housing Minister Iván Poduje said the decision should be reversed. Critics, however, see this as a political decision at the expense of coming to terms with the past.

== Films and television ==
- A Place Called Dignity, a 2021 film concerning Colonia Dignidad.
- Colonia, a 2015 film set primarily in Colonia Dignidad.
- Colonia Dignidad: Aus dem Innern einer deutschen Sekte, a 2019 documentary miniseries by Annette Baumeister und Wilfried Huismann. English language version released by Netflix in 2021 as A Sinister Sect: Colonia Dignidad.
- Dignity, Chilean-German thriller television series about the investigation against Paul Schäfer.
- Hunting Hitler, season 2 episode 8 "Nazi Colony".
- The Tunnel, whose second season involves past Colonia Dignidad crimes.
- The Wolf House, Chilean animated film about a young woman who escaped from Colonia Dignidad.

== See also ==
- Cândido Godói, similar expatriate German settlement in Brazil with reputed ties to Josef Mengele
