= Angela Schanelec =

German actress

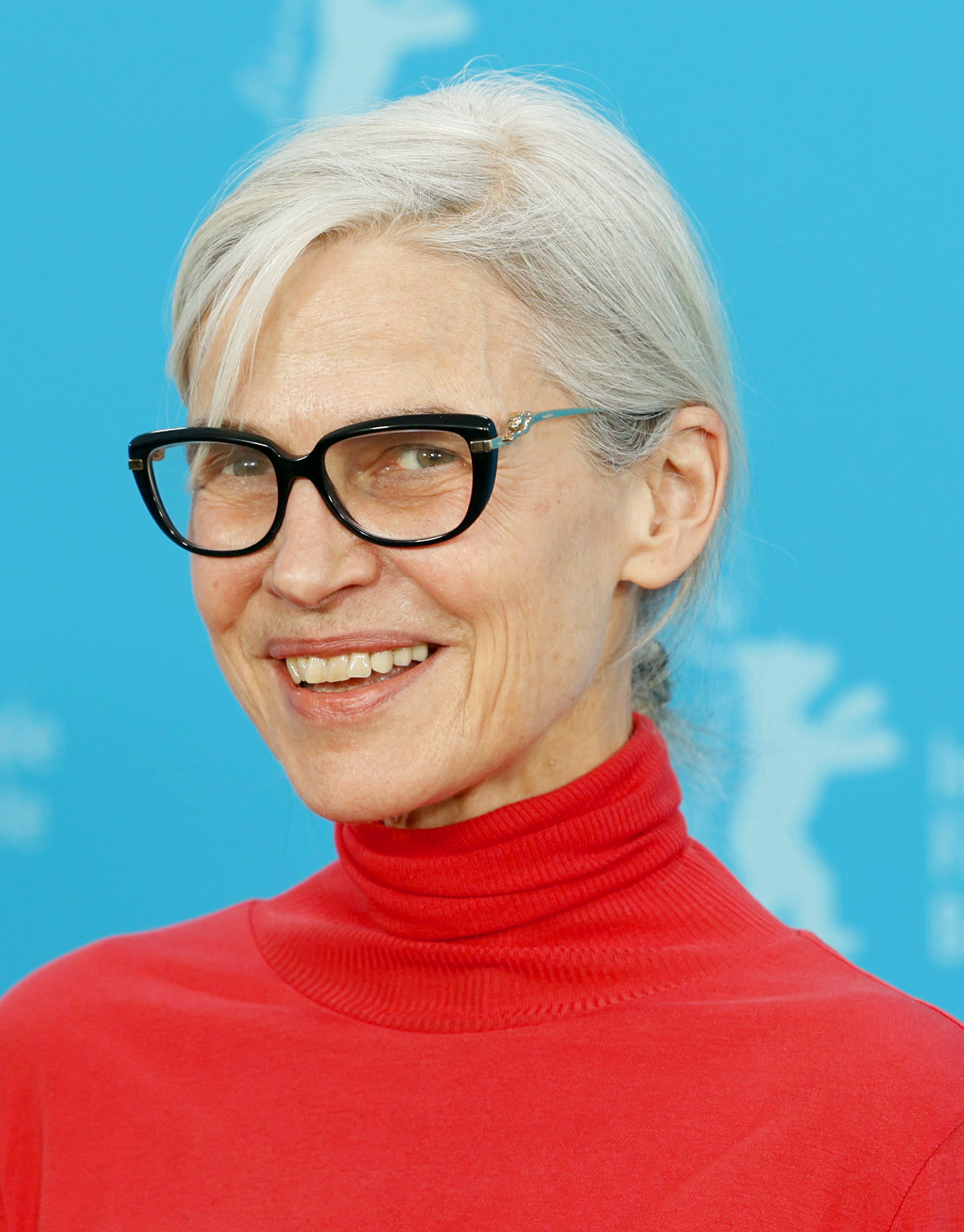
- Schanelec in 2026
- Born: 14 February 1962 (age 64); Aalen, Baden-Württemberg, West Germany
- Occupations: Actress, film director, screenwriter
- Years active: 1985–present

Angela Schanelec (German: [aŋˈɡeːla ˈʃaːnəlɛk]; born 14 February 1962) is a German actress, film director, screenwriter, and translator.

Her film Places in Cities was screened in the Un Certain Regard section at the 1998 Cannes Film Festival. In 2019, Schanelec won the Silver Bear for Best Director, for her film I Was at Home, But, at the 69th Berlin International Film Festival. During the 73rd Berlin International Film Festival, in 2023, Schanelec won the Silver Bear for Best Screenplay, for Music.

== Biography ==
Schanelec was born in Aalen, Baden-Württemberg, in Germany. Her artistic career began as an actress onstage.

Today she is best known for her career as a filmmaker, which began during her time at the Berlin Film and Television Academy (dffb). There, she studied under Harun Farocki and Hartmut Bitomsky. She met Christian Petzold and Thomas Arslan, with whom she has comprised the so-called first wave of the Berlin School. During this time, she produced her thesis film, I Stayed in Berlin All Summer, a 47-minute featurette.

Schanelec, Petzold and Arslan found support in the budding artistic scene of post-reunification Berlin, and in the production company Schramm Film, operated by Michael Weber and Florian Koerner von Gustorf. Since graduating from dffb, she has written and directed nine features and contributed segments to the anthology films Bridges of Sarajevo and Germany 09.

== Critical reception ==
Schanelec's films have premiered at numerous renowned film festivals, including the Cannes Film Festival, the Berlin International Film Festival, and the Toronto International Film Festival. Critics have generally embraced her cinematic style, which almost exclusively employs lengthy, static shots with little action and ambiguous emotional content, tenuously connected by a narrative. Marco Abel, a scholar of the Berlin School, argues that her films function through "affective images" which reach the viewer primarily through their visual content, mostly without requiring narrative context. She is frequently compared to several European avant-garde filmmakers, such as Chantal Akerman, Michelangelo Antonioni, and Robert Bresson, whom she has cited as an important influence. However, Derek Elley, writing for Variety, called Places in Cities a "joyless snoozer" and remarked that Schanelec's films "throw out no emotional lifelines for the viewer."

An image from Schanelec's film Afternoon appears on the cover of the book Cinemas of Therapeutic Activism: Depression and the Politics of Existence (Amsterdam University Press, 2020).

== Filmography ==
=== Feature films ===
Year	English Title	Original Title	Notes
1995	My Sister's Good Fortune	Das Glück meiner Schwester	
1998	Places in Cities	Plätze in Städten	
2001	Passing Summer	Mein langsames Leben	
2004	Marseille		
2007	Afternoon	Nachmittag	
2010	Orly		
2016	The Dreamed Path	Der traumhafte Weg	
2019	I Was at Home, But	Ich war zuhause, aber	Silver Bear for Best Director
2023	Music		Silver Bear for Best Screenplay
2026	My Wife Cries	Meine Frau weint	

=== Short films ===
- 1991 - Lovely Yellow Color
- 1992 - Far Away
- 1992 - Prague, March '92 (short documentary)
- 1992 - Über das Entgegenkommen
- 1994 - I Stayed in Berlin All Summer
- 2009 - Germany 09: 13 Short Films About The State Of The Nation (segment: First Day)
- 2014 - Bridges of Sarajevo (segment: Principe, texte)

=== As actress ===
- 1984 - Die Familie oder Schroffenstein (TV movie), as Agnes
- 1985 - The Death of the White Stallion, as Anna
- 1994 - I Stayed in Berlin All Summer, as Nadine
- 1995 - My Sister's Good Fortune, as Isabel
- 1997 - Daily Chicken, as Frau Rötting
- 1999 - Dealer, as Eva
- 1999 - Dragonland (TV movie), as Mother
- 2001 - Passing Summer, as Thomas' geschiedene Frau
- 2007 - Afternoon, as Irene
- 2014 - A House in Berlin, as Käthe Blacher
- 2015 - Take What You Can Carry (short), as Angela

== Accolades ==
- 2019 - Silver Bear for Best Director, for I Was at Home, But
- 2023 - Silver Bear for Best Screenplay, for Music
