= Ewald Frank =

German preacher (1933–2024)

Missionary Ewald Frank

Personal details
- Born: 24 December 1933 Free City of Danzig
- Died: 8 June 2024 (aged 90)
- Residence: Krefeld

Ewald Frank (24 December 1933 – 8 June 2024) was a German preacher, founder and director of the center, Freie Volksmission (Free People's Mission), a free church in Krefeld.

== Biography ==
Ewald Frank was born in 1933 in the Danzig region. He lived in West Germany after the end of World War II. Until 1955, he devoted himself to personal study of the Bible. After large demonstrations by the American preacher William M. Branham and others in Karlsruhe, a small circle of followers formed in Krefeld, of which Frank became the leader. From 1956 to 1959, he stayed in the United States and Canada.

The beginning of the Freie Volksmission dates back to New Year's Eve 1959, when Frank invited 14 people to a meeting in his private apartment in Krefeld. At the end of this meeting, the people gathered formed a closer group which became the seed of the future church.

On 2 April 1962 Frank heard, according to his own testimony, the all-commanding voice of the Lord in German: "My servant, your time for this city will soon be over. I will send you to other cities to preach my Word". Since then, he felt called to "spiritual service". He was initially active in Pentecostal churches, but since Branham's death, he saw himself as continuing his end-times message.

Frank died on 8 June 2024, at the age of 90.

== Foundation of the religious congregation ==
Ewald Frank rented a small hall in Krefeld and began his popular mission work. In 1964, the Freie Volksmission Krefeld, founded by Frank, was recognized as a public benefit association. It then had 250 members. In the same year, Frank traveled to India for the first time to preach about and share his faith. In October 2014, he left for his 25th mission to India.

Frank undertook numerous missionary journeys. In 2001, his church had approximately 3000 members. In addition to a 550-seat church, the mission's printing and publishing house is located at the headquarters in Krefeld. The Freie Volksmission has full-time employees in 2014 and is mainly financed by donations. According to the Idea Agency, around 300 people gather for church. On 5 and 6 April 2014, the 50th anniversary services attracted 1,200 guests.

== Theology ==
According to the website of the Freie Volksmission, Frank's theology was based on the Bible as "the only source and complete foundation of our faith, the only guideline in teaching and life". The objective of Frank for the Freie Volksmission was the "complete return to the teaching and practice of the church at the time of the apostles". The church rejects the Nicene Creed and the Trinity, which unite major Christian churches, practices water baptism according to the apostolic pattern and suggests that followers leave their former religious communities.

Frank was a follower of the controversial preacher William M. Branham and advocated his particular doctrine in speech and writing.

== Controversy ==
Frank was presumed to be the spiritual successor of Paul Schäfer, the former leader of the sectarian cult colony Colonia Dignidad in Chile according to Westdeutsche Zeitung on 21 December 2011, citing a declaration from the regional court of Düsseldorf. The Freie Volksmission has, however, distanced itself from Colonia Dignidad.

== Publications ==
- Baptism, Lord's Supper, Foot Washing. Krefeld: Freie Volksmission. 1986.
- Das Konzil Gottes [The Council of God] (in German). Marburg: Rathmann. 1964. OCLC 844931016.
- God and His Plan with Humanity. Krefeld: Freie Volksmission. 1982.
- Only Believe the "Thus Saith the Lord". Krefeld: Freie Volksmission. 1966. OCLC 1175993954.
- Revelation: a book with seven seals?. Krefeld: Freie Volksmission. 1995. OCLC 51620244.
- The Challenge of Christian Theology and more... Krefeld: Freie Volksmission. 1999.
- Traditional Christianity – truth or deception?. Krefeld: Freie Volksmission. 1993. OCLC 1056583221.
- Was sagt die Heilige Schrift? Die christlichen Grundlehren auf dem Prüfstand [What does Holy Scripture say? Christian fundamentals put to the test.] (in German). Overath: QuickPrinter. 2006.
- William Branham, ein Prophet von Gott gesandt [William Branham, a prophet sent by God] (in German). Krefeld: Freie Volksmission. OCLC 1437594808. (after 1969)
