= A Decent Man (2015 Swiss film) =

- Film poster
- Directed by: Micha Lewinsky
- Written by: Micha Lewinsky
- Produced by: H. C. Vogel
- Starring: Devid Striesow; Maren Eggert; Lotte Becker
- Cinematography: Pierre Mennel
- Edited by: Gion-Reto Killias
- Music by: Marcel Blatti
- Production companies: Plan B Film GmbH; SRF Schweizer Radio und Fernsehen; Teleclub AG; SRG SSR
- Distributed by: Filmcoopi Zürich AG
- Release dates: 26 September 2015 (Zurich); 11 February 2016 (Germany)
- Running time: 92 minutes
- Country: Switzerland
- Language: German

A Decent Man (German: Nichts passiert, lit. “No harm done”) is a 2015 Swiss film written and directed by Micha Lewinsky. It follows a family holiday disrupted by a serious incident. The film premiered at the 2015 Zurich Film Festival and won Best Screenplay at the 2016 Swiss Film Awards.

== Synopsis ==
During a ski holiday in the Swiss Alps, Thomas hopes for a peaceful break with his family, even after Sarah, the daughter of his boss, joins them. When the two teenagers get into trouble with local youths, Thomas avoids confronting the situation. His efforts to keep everything calm instead deepen the family’s difficulties and draw him further into deception.

== Cast ==
The cast includes:

- Devid Striesow as Thomas Engel
- Maren Eggert as Martina Engel
- Lotte Becker as Jenny Engel
- Annina Walt as Sarah Orlov
- Stéphane Maeder as Ruedi

== Background ==
Lewinsky described the film as a personal project and said he wanted it to prompt discussion about sexual abuse and the responsibility of witnesses to act. He said he was particularly interested in the question of where culpability begins and at what point a witness becomes complicit by failing to intervene. In preparing the film, he consulted the victim support centre Schlupfhuus.

== Reception ==
=== Awards and nominations ===
In 2015, the film won the award for best screenplay at Kinofest Lünen. In 2016, it won best actor and the special prize for young actress at the Open Air International Film Festival in Saranda. At the 2016 Swiss Film Awards, it was nominated for Best Fiction Film and Best Actress, and won Best Screenplay.

=== Critical response ===
Filmdienst praised the film’s screenplay and casting. It described it as a black comedy and a portrait of a man who avoids conflict. SRF wrote that the film starts as a comedy but becomes darker as Thomas tries to keep peace in the family and tells more lies. It praised Devid Striesow in the lead role and also priased the rest of the cast.

== Festival screenings ==
The film premiered at the Zurich Film Festival in September 2015. It was later screened at festivals including the Guadalajara International Film Festival, the Minneapolis St. Paul International Film Festival, the Shanghai International Film Festival, and the Locarno Film Festival in 2016.
