= Gerhard Mertins =

German Intelligence operative (1919–1993)

Gerhard Georg Mertins
- Born: 30 December 1919; Berlin, Germany
- Died: 19 March 1993 (aged 73); Florida, United States
- Military career
- Allegiance: (Nazi Germany) Germany (1940-1945); Iran (1976)
- Branch: Luftwaffe
- Rank: Hauptmann
- Commands: Fallschirm-Pionier-Bataillon 5
- Conflicts: World War II: Operation Mercury; Eastern Front; Operation Greif
- Awards: Knight's Cross of the Iron Cross
- Other work: Businessman; Arms dealer; Intelligence operative

Gerhard Georg Mertins (30 December 1919 – 19 March 1993) was a German paratrooper, post-war arms dealer and German Intelligence operative. In 1943, he participated in the Gran Sasso raid rescuing Benito Mussolini from prison. According to Manuel Contreras, he allegedly supplied the Pinochet regime with arms and helicopters. In 1976, he and Manuel Contreras traveled to Tehran to offer the Shah regime help in killing Carlos the Jackal.

== Awards ==
- Knight's Cross of the Iron Cross on 6 December 1944 as Hauptmann and leader of Fallschirm-Pionier-Bataillon 5
