= Factor X (Chilean TV series) season 1 =

Factor X
- Season 1
- Hosted by: Julián Elfenbein
- Judges: Tito Beltrán; Zeta Bosio; Karen Doggenweiler; Nydia Caro
- Winner: Sergio Járlaz
- Runner-up: Stanley Weissohn

Release
- Original network: TVN
- Original release: March 3 – May 10, 2011

Factor X is a Chilean television music competition show, to find new singing talent; the winner of which receives a recording contract with a record label. The first season of the show debuted on March 3, 2011, and will be aired on Thursday and Sunday. The auditions were in January 2011 and where more than 10.000 people arrived throughout the process. It will be hosted by Julián Elfenbein, the same host of the other recent successful talent show Talento Chileno, the Chilean versión of the Got Talent franchise. It will be the second version of this format made in Latin America after the Colombian El factor X shows, but the first to meet the new requirements of the franchise in the level of production. The judges for this season are Zeta Bosio, Karen Doggenweiler and Tito Beltrán, with Nydia Caro as guest judge.

== Selection process ==
=== Auditions ===
In January 2011 massive auditions started in search of contestants including casting in Santiago and various regions. Initial auditions were held in Concepción which is known as "The Chilean capital of rock" and is home to many artists and La Serena, a city that brings large crowds of people in summer season.

The casting process was formally launched with the release of the application forms on the official website of the competition, released on December 10, 2010. The website announced four categories of participants, soloists, duos, trios and vocal groups and the age limit to join the program was set at 14 years. For groups, a maximum of six members would be allowed.

The initial auditions would be held in front of the producers, and a certain number of them would qualify to sing in front of the judges. Auditions would be held in the Mall Plaza chain of shopping malls in three cities and will begin at 10:30 and running each day until 21:30. In each of the three cities where auditions will be held, with the presence of three permanent judges in addition to a different guest judge in each city, well known nationally or internationally. In Concepción, after applicant sang to the producers at the local Mall Plaza chain, they moved to the stage before the judges at Marina del Sol Theatre on 13 and 14 January 2011, making also their first recordings for the program. The permanent jury was composed of Zeta Bosio, Karen Doggenweiler, Tito Beltran whereas Nydia Caro served as guest judge. More than 3,000 people applied. After round for casting in front of the production team, there was a pre-selected round for appearing in front of specialists, including the "vocal couch" during the implementation of the program. In this phase, 200 applicants were selected for new hearings held on January 13, where between 80 and 100 of them would be finally presented to the permanent jury end of the same week. On January 18, 2011, the casting was seeking for people selected to audition in Santiago, the site reached more than 5,000 people, of which about 500 spent the night in tents outside the place. The stage of auditions in front of the judges was between 20—22 January at the installations of Televisión Nacional de Chile. On January 26, made the selection process at La Serena, where 2,000 people came. The auditions in front of the judges in the city of La Serena were performed in the historic city Centennial Theatre.

Dates

City	Stage	Date	Venue	Guest Judge
Concepción	Producers' auditions	January 12, 2011	Mall Plaza Trébol	Nydia Caro
Concepción	Judges' auditions	January 14–15, 2011	Marina del Sol Theatre	Nydia Caro
Santiago	Producers' auditions	January 18, 2011	Mall Plaza Oeste	Nydia Caro
Santiago	Judges' auditions	January 20–22, 2011	Televisión Nacional de Chile	Nydia Caro
La Serena	Producers' auditions	January 26, 2011	Mall Plaza La Serena	Nydia Caro
La Serena	Judges' auditions	January 28–29, 2011	Centennial Theatre	Nydia Caro

=== Bootcamp ===
The workshop phase is the second phase of the program to be broadcast in two chapters, these chapters will gather all people classified in the stage of hearings in Santiago to face a series of tests within the workshops and work to prepare a particular song and choreography, this is where they were also presented to the contestants the task force, composed by the choreographer, vocal coach and music producer in this part they work and divided into categories.

In these so-called "workshops", the nominees of the casting mass, which border the 150 people, will be presented to the jury again, but this time without an audience, where it will become an important selection of 24 participants to leave once they finish "Workshops" will be eight per category.

=== Judges' houses ===
Thereafter come two emissions that are called "Judges' houses", when the participants will sing in a house where they will receive each juror who already has that category, that is, at that moment learn that the jury will be your advocate and will work with them as a mentor, adding that each juror is inviting another famous, i.e. a special guest to help the jury to decide and there auditioning for and the last eight of each category are only four. Being a total of 12 selected, which will be part of the gala live.

The twelve eliminated acts were:

- 14-24s: Constanza Despouy, Dominique Leiva, Giezy Carrasco, Vannia Aguilar
- Over 25s: Joaquín Aguilar, Gianfranco Malinconi, Matthew Wiggan, Liliana Olivos
- Groups: Galaxia, Cómplices, Our Dream, Deep Skin

== Contestants ==
– Winner
– Runner-up
– Third Place

Category (mentor)	Acts			
14–24s (Bosio)	Tania Giordano	Paolo Ramirez	Stanley Weissohn	Jennifer López
Over 25s (Beltrán)	Héctor Núñez	Madriela Marchant	María Paz Duarte	Sergio Járlaz
Groups (Doggenweiler)	Dulce Tabú	Agnus	Aduana	MB & J

== Live shows ==
There will be ten live broadcast episodes in which participants must present songs with various themes. There will also be daily presentations by guest artists. There will also be weekly eliminations according to public vote and judges' decisions.

=== Results summary ===
Colour key

–	Contestant was in the bottom two/three and had to sing again in the final showdown
–	Contestant was finished in Third place
–	Contestant received the fewest public votes and was immediately eliminated (no final showdown)
–	Contestant received the most public votes

Table showing weekly results, indicating which contestants were eliminated or safe, how each judge voted, and positions in each week's public vote.
	Show 1	Show 2	Show 3	Show 4	Show 5	Show 6	Show 7	Show 8	Show 9	Final
Sergio Járlaz	Safe	Safe	Safe	Safe	Safe	Safe	Safe	Safe	Safe	Winner
Stanley Weissohn	Safe	Safe	Safe	Safe	Safe	Safe	Safe	Safe	Safe	Runner-Up
Madriela Marchant	Safe	Safe	Safe	Safe	Safe	Safe	Safe	Safe	Safe	3rd
MB & J	Safe	Safe	Safe	Bottom two	Safe	Safe	Bottom two	Safe	4th	Eliminated (Live Show 9)
Paolo Ramirez	Safe	Safe	Safe	Safe	Safe	Bottom two	Safe	5th	Eliminated (Live Show 8)	
Héctor Núñez	Safe	Safe	Safe	Safe	Safe	Safe	Bottom two	Eliminated (Live Show 7)		
Dulce Tabú	Safe	Bottom two	Bottom two	Safe	Bottom two	Bottom two	Eliminated (Live Show 6)			
Agnus	Safe	Safe	Safe	Safe	Bottom two	Eliminated (Live Show 5)				
Tania Giordano	Safe	Safe	Safe	Bottom two	Eliminated (Live Show 4)					
Jeniffer López	Bottom two	Safe	Bottom two	Eliminated (Live Show 3)						
Aduana	Safe	Bottom two	Eliminated (Live Show 2)							
María Paz Duarte	Bottom two	Eliminated (Live Show 1)								
Final showdown	Jeniffer López, María Paz Duarte	Dulce Tabú, Aduana	Jeniffer López, Dulce Tabú	Tania Giordano, MB & J	Agnus, Dulce Tabú	Paolo Ramírez, Dulce Tabú	Héctor Nuñez, MB & J	No final showdown or judges' vote: results are based on public votes alone		
Judges voted to	Eliminate							No final showdown or judges' vote: results are based on public votes alone		
Beltrán's vote	Jeniffer López	Aduana	Jeniffer López	Tania Giordano	Dulce Tabú	Dulce Tabú	MB & J	No final showdown or judges' vote: results are based on public votes alone		
Doggenweiler's vote	María Paz Duarte	Aduana	Jeniffer López	Tania Giordano	Agnus	Paolo Ramírez	Héctor Nuñez	No final showdown or judges' vote: results are based on public votes alone		
Bosio's vote	María Paz Duarte	Dulce Tabú	Dulce Tabú	MB & J	Agnus	Dulce Tabú	Héctor Nuñez	No final showdown or judges' vote: results are based on public votes alone		
Eliminated	María Paz Duarte; 2 of 3 votes Majority	Aduana; 2 of 3 votes Majority	Jeniffer López; 2 of 3 votes Majority	Tania Giordano; 2 of 3 votes Majority	Agnus; 2 of 3 votes Majority	Dulce Tabú; 2 of 3 votes Majority	Héctor Nuñez; 2 of 3 votes Majority	Paolo Ramírez	MB & J	—

=== Live show details ===
==== Live Show 1 (7 April) ====
- Theme: Contestant's choice
- Celebrity performers: None

A summary of the contestants' performances on the first live show and results show, along with the results.
Act	Order	Song	Resul
Paolo Ramirez	1	"Superstition"	Safe
Madriela Marchant	2	"Estrechez de Corazón"	Safe
Aduana	3	"The Way You Make Me Feel"	Safe
Sergio Jarlaz	4	"Mentira"	Safe
Jennifer López	5	"Poker Face"	Bottom two
María Paz Duarte	6	"Big Girls Don't Cry"	Bottom two
Stanley Weissohn	7	"Baby"	Safe
Dulce Tabú	8	"Single Ladies (Put a Ring on It)"	Safe
Agnus	9	"Desde Que Te Vi"	Safe
Héctor Núñez	10	"Pégate"	Safe
MB & J	11	"Danza Kuduro"	Safe
Tania Giordano	12	"De Que Manera Te Olvido"	Safe
Final showdown details
María Paz Duarte	1	"True Colors"	Eliminated
Jennifer López	2	"I'm Like a Bird"	Safe

Judge's vote to eliminate

- Bosio: María Paz Duarte
- Doggenweiler: María Paz Duarte
- Beltrán: Jennifer López

==== Live Show 2 (11 April) ====
- Theme: Top 20s Hits from all time
- Celebrity performers: None

A summary of the contestants' performances on the second live show and results show, along with the results.
Act	Order	Song	Resul
Héctor Nuñez	1	"Quién Te Quiere Como Yo"	Safe
Agnus	2	"Bésame"	Safe
Stanley Weissohn	3	"DJ Got Us Fallin' In Love"	Safe
Madriela Marchant	4	"La Masa"	Safe
Dulce Tabú	5	"Falsas Esperanzas"	Bottom two
Jeniffer López	6	"Loca"	Safe
Sergio Jarlaz	7	"Yo Te Amo"	Safe
MB & J	8	"El Amor"	Safe
Tania Giordano	9	"El Último Adiós"	Safe
Aduana	10	"I Gotta Feeling"	Bottom two
Paolo Ramírez	11	"Rock with You"	Safe
Final showdown details
Dulce Tabú	1	"You've Got a Friend"	Safe
Aduana	2	"Don't Speak"	Eliminated

Judge's vote to eliminate

- Bosio: Dulce Tabú
- Doggenweiler: Aduana
- Beltrán: Aduana

==== Live Show 3 (14 April) ====
- Theme: Dance songs
- Celebrity performers: None

A summary of the contestants' performances on the third live show and results show, along with the results.
Act	Order	Song	Result
Dulce Tabú	1	"Free Your Mind"	Bottom two
Paolo Ramírez	2	"Paradise City"	Safe
Sergio Jarlaz	3	"Sube a Nacer Conmigo Hermano"	Safe
MB & J	4	"Te Amo Con Locura"	Safe
Jeniffer López	5	"Corazón Prohibido"	Bottom two
Madriela Marchant	6	"Aquí"	Safe
Tania Giordano	7	"Yo Canto"	Safe
Stanley Weissohn	8	"Inolvidable"	Safe
Agnus	9	"Loca"	Safe
Hector Núñez	10	"Las Avispas"	Safe
Final showdown details
Jeniffer López	1	"Sola Otra Vez"	Eliminated
Dulce Tabú	2	"Killing Me Softly with His Song"	Safe

Judge's vote to eliminate

- Bosio: Dulce Tabú
- Doggenweiler: Jeniffer López
- Beltrán: Jeniffer López

==== Live Show 4 (18 April) ====
- Theme: Greatest Hits from All Time
- Celebrity performers: None

A summary of the contestants' performances on the fourth live show and results show, along with the results.
Act	Order	Song	Result
Stanley Weissohn	1	"Complicated"	Safe
Madriela Marchant	2	"Volver, Volver"	Safe
Agnus	3	"La Joya del Pacífico"	Safe
Héctor Nuñez	4	"¿Quién Me Iba a Decir?"	Safe
Dulce Tabú	5	"Yo No Soy Esa Mujer"	Safe
Paolo Ramírez	6	"Aquí Estoy Yo"	Safe
MB & J	7	"Ella Me Levantó"	Bottom two
Sergio Jarlaz	8	"Dueño De Nada"	Safe
Tania Giordano	9	"No Me Enseñaste"	Bottom two
Final showdown details
MB & J	1	"Noche de Entierro (Nuestro Amor)"	Safe
Tania Giordano	2	"Tan Enamorados"	Eliminated

Judge's vote to eliminate

- Bosio: MB & J
- Doggenweiler: Tania Giordano
- Beltrán: Tania Giordano

==== Live Show 5 (21 April) ====
- Theme: Free
- Celebrity performers: None

A summary of the contestants' performances on the fifth live show and results show, along with the results.
Act	Order	Song	Result
Paolo Ramírez	1	"Kiss"	Safe
Madriela Marchant	2	"Me Dediqué a Perderte"	Safe
Dulce Tabú	3	"Proud Mary"	Bottom two
Sergio Jarlaz	4	"Escándalo"	Safe
MB & J	5	"Obsesión"	Safe
Stanley Weissohn	6	"Everybody (Backstreet's Back)"	Safe
Agnus	7	"Bailar Pegados"	Bottom two
Héctor Nuñez	8	"Devórame Otra Vez"	Safe
Final showdown details
Dulce Tabú	1	"Lady Marmalade"	Safe
Agnus	2	"Estoy Enamorado"	Eliminated

Judge's vote to eliminate

- Bosio: Agnus
- Doggenweiler: Agnus
- Beltrán: Dulce Tabú

==== Live Show 6 (25 April) ====
- Theme: 80's Songs
- Celebrity performers: Heather Kunst ("Sweet Dreams (Are Made of This)")

A summary of the contestants' performances on the sixth live show and results show, along with the results.
Act	Order	Song	Result
Paolo Ramírez	1	"Persiana Americana"	Bottom two
Sergio Jarlaz	2	"Te Amaré"	Safe
MB & J	3	"Cuando Seas Grande"	Safe
Stanley Weissohn	4	"Creo que te Quiero"	Safe
Dulce Tabú	5	"Like a Virgin"	Bottom two
Héctor Nuñez	6	"Daniela"	Safe
Madriela Marchant	7	"Yo Vengo a Ofrecer mi Corazón"	Safe
Final showdown details
Dulce Tabú	1	"Toxic"	Eliminated
Paolo Ramírez	2	"Desnudate Mujer"	Safe

Judge's vote to eliminate

- Bosio: Dulce Tabú
- Doggenweiler: Paolo Ramírez
- Beltrán: Dulce Tabú

==== Live Show 7 (28 April) ====
- Theme: Viña del Mar International Song Festival
- Celebrity performers: Liliana Olivos ("Baño de Mar a Medianoche")

A summary of the contestants' performances on the seventh live show and results show, along with the results.
Act	Order	Song	Result
MB & J	1	"Llamado de Emergencia"	Bottom two
Staley Weissohn	2	"Sirena"	Safe
Sergio Jarlaz	3	"Bella Sin Alma"	Safe
Paolo Ramírez	4	"Every Little Thing She Does is Magic"	Safe
Madriela Marchant	5	"Piensa en Mi"	Safe
Héctor Nuñez	6	"Nadie Como Ella"	Bottom two
Final showdown details
MB & J	1	"Ahora Es"	Safe
Héctor Nuñez	2	"Kimbara"	Eliminated

Judge's vote to eliminate

- Bosio: Héctor Nuñez
- Doggenweiler: Héctor Nuñez
- Beltrán: MB & J

==== Live Show 8 (2 May) ====
- Theme: Free
- Celebrity performers: None

A summary of the contestants' performances on the eighth live show and results show, along with the results.
Act	Order	Song	Result
Stanley Weissohn	1	"The Only Exception"	Safe
Madriela Marchant	2	"Y Volveré"	Safe
MB & J	3	"Mi Cama Huele a Ti"	Safe
Paolo Ramírez	4	"Play That Funky Music"	Eliminated
Sergio Jarlaz	5	"Carusso"	Safe

- For the first time in the series, there was no final showdown and the act that received the fewest public votes was automatically eliminated. This was Paolo Ramírez.

==== Live Show 9 (5 May) ====
- Theme: Free
- Celebrity performers: Aleks Syntek ("Duele el Amor" / "Más de 1000 Años")

A summary of the contestants' performances on the eighth live show and results show, along with the results.
Act	Order	Song	Order	Song	Result
MB & J	1	"La Despedida"	5	"Taboo"	Eliminated
Sergio Jarlaz	2	"Melancolía"	6	"Como Todos"	Safe
Stanley Weissohn	3	"The Lazy Song"	7	"Déjame Gritar"	Safe
Madriela Marchant	4	"Gracias a la Vida"	8	"Si Nos Dejan"	Safe

There was, again, no final showdown, and MB & J was eliminated having received the fewest votes.

==== Live Show 10 (10 May) ====
- Theme: Mentor's favourite performance from the competition; celebrity duet; contestant's choice.
- Group performance: "Looking for Paradise" (performed by all 12 finalists)

Celebrity duet performers:

  - Natalino with Madriela Marchant
  - Andrés de León with Stanley Weissohn
  - Amaya Forch with Sergio Jarlaz

A summary of the contestants' performances on the eighth live show and results show, along with the results.
Act	Order	Song(Mentor's favourite performance)	Order	Song(Celebrity duet)	Order	Song(Constant's choice)	Result
Madriela Marchant	1	"Piensa En Mi"	4	"Si Hablo de Ti, Hablo de Mi" (con Natalino)	N/A	N/A	Third place
Stanley Weissohn	2	"DJ Got Us Fallin' In Love"	5	"Y Llegaste Tú" (con Andrés de León)	8	"Hoy ya me voy"	Runner-up
Sergio Jarlaz	3	"Como Yo Te Amo"	6	"Sueño Imposible" (con Amaya Forch)	7	"Yo Te Amo"	Winner

== Reception ==
=== Ratings ===
Episode	Date	Audience	Daily rank	Weekly rank	Rating (%)
Auditions 1	3 March	2.3 million	1	2	22.8
Auditions 2	8 March	1.7 million	2	11	17.3
Auditions 3	10 March	2.3 million	2	5	22.5
Auditions 4	13 March	2.1 million	2	8	20.6
Auditions 5	17 March	2.4 million	1	2	23.7
Auditions 6	21 March	1.7 million	4	18	17.1
Bootcamp	24 March	1.9 million	2	6	18.8
Bootcamp	28 March	1.7 million	4	18	16.8
Judges' Houses	31 March	1.5 million	4	25	14.9
Judges' Houses	4 April	1.6 million	4	24	15.5
Live Show 1	7 April	1.7 million	2	14	17.2
Live Show 2	11 April	1.7 million	6	14	16.9
Live Show 3	14 April	1.8 million	4	23	17.9
Live Show 4	18 April	1.7 million	5	19	16.5
Live Show 5	21 April	2.0 million	1	4	19.8
Live Show 6	25 April	1.8 million	3	11	17.9
Live Show 7	28 April	1.6 million	7	32	15.6
Live Show 8	2 May	1.8 million	1	3	18.3
Live Show 9	5 May	1.6 million	6	23	16.4
Live Show 10	9 May	2.1 million	1	2	21.3
