= Factor X (Chilean TV series) =

Chilean version of X Factor TV show

- Created by: Simon Cowell
- Creative director: Sebastián Raponi
- Presented by: Julián Elfenbein
- Judges: Tito Beltrán; Karen Doggenweiler; Mon Laferte (2012); José Luis Rodríguez (2012); Zeta Bosio (2011)
- Country of origin: Chile
- Original language: Spanish

Production
- Producers: FremantleMedia; Promofilm

Original release
- Network: TVN
- Release: March 3, 2011 – June 15, 2012

Related
- The X Factor

Factor X Chile is a television show, adapted from the original British show as part of The X Factor franchise. The auditions were in January 2011. The first season of the Chilean version was premiered on television on March 3, 2011. It will be hosted by Julian Elfenbein, the same host of the other recent successful talent show Talento Chileno, the Chilean versión of the Got Talent franchise. It is the second version of this format made in Latin America, but the first to meet the new requirements of the franchise in the level of production. The judges for the first series of the show are Zeta Bosio, Karen Doggenweiler, and Tito Beltrán, with various guest judges. The first season aired on Thursday and Sunday, starting on March 3, 2011, in TVN.

== Format ==

The format used is based on the original idea of Simon Cowell. The judging panel consists of three judges who know the musical and artistic environment will mentor and train the participants alongside guest artists. Soloists, duos, trios or groups can take part. The winner will get a contract with a record label to record and produce their debut album, in addition to obtaining a cash award.

There are five stages to Factor X competition:

- Stage 1: Producers' auditions (these auditions decide who will sing in front of the judges)
- Stage 2: Judges' auditions
- Stage 3: Boot camp
- Stage 4: Visits to judges' houses
- Stage 5: Live shows (finals)

== Show summary ==
"Tito Beltran"
"Karen Doggenweiler"
"Zeta Bosio"
"Mon Laferte"
"El Puma"

Season	Air date	Winner	Runner-up	Third Place	Fourth Place	Winning Mentor	Host(s)	Main Judges	Guest Judges
1	March 3, 2011 — May 9, 2011	Sergio Járlaz	Stanley Weissohn	Madriela Marchant	MB & J	Tito Beltrán	Julián Elfenbein	Tito Beltrán; Zeta Bosio; Karen Doggenweiler	Nydia Caro
2	March 7, 2012 — June 15, 2012	Juan Gabriel Valenzuela	Francisca Barrera	Grey Cerro	Dos Segundos	José Luis Rodríguez	Julián Elfenbein	Tito Beltrán; Karen Doggenweiler; Mon Laferte; José Luis Rodríguez	—N/a

== Development ==
From August 2010 that the production group Promofilm (led by Sebastian Raponi and Alicia de las Casas) was working on the project in parallel to the Talk show A/Z. Raponi and De las Casas, are renowned for their work in the production of successful projects in Canal 13 like La Granja VIP and Hit, La Fiebre del Karaoke, among other prime time shows of that network. The producers initially thought assigning hosting to Rafael Araneda, but his move to Chilevisión put an end to that plan.

On November 21, 2010, the launching of the X Factor format was officially announced by Televisión Nacional de Chile Channel known as TVN. This was the a first Chilean television. the station had previously worked with other British licenses like Dancing with the Stars, and their expertise was recognized in respect of organizing the new X Factor format.

The show marks the start of the new state television programming for the 2011 season, and will be hosted by Julián Elfenbein who joined TVN, after leaving Chilevisión and successful projects such as Fiebre de Baile and Talento Chileno. The big success of these shows encouraged TVN to buy the rights for The X Factor license. Elfenbein officially joined the channel in January 2011 and immediately become involved in the production work that was in charge of the team's executive producer, Sebastian Raponi.

=== Production ===
On December 10, 2010, debuted on television the first promotional spot. X Factor Chile debut in March 2011 and there is competition for the audience in prime time with Chilevisión's Talento Chileno (Chilean's Got Talent), which premiered the second season in the same half of the year, however, by both FremantleMedia Productions can not be broadcast during the same time in different channels, according to the license purchase agreement by which the production of CHV will be the second season of Talento Chileno May 2011. Sheila Aguirre, chief executive of FremantleMedia told to El Mercurio that producers of the original version of The X Factor UK will visit Chile periodically to certify that the version of the program is held to govern the parameters set by the license, in addition to being present during the auditions of January.

During the last week of November 2010, Chris O'Dell executive producer FremantleMedia met with the team led by Sebastián Raponi to start working on the preproduction of space, being the priority to December 2010 found the group of judges will have a role to evaluate and guide the participants themselves, so they need to understand music and the market, the four members of the jury will be revealed during the first weeks of January 2011.

The team production of the show will define the three judges of the program during the week of January 3, 2011, also will be a promotional activity on January 5 in the city of Concepción, led by Julián Elfenbein, this is the Elfenbein first public appearance as one of the faces of Televisión Nacional de Chile, in this event is expected to be revealed the names of the judges, as well as promote what will be the first date of auditions in that city on January 12, 2011. Elfenbein made an appearance on the talk show Animal Nocturno on January 6, to promote the TV show.

"The production of "Factor X" will be incredible. Never seen before in Chile. We are staging the 7th version, which is the latest English version that just ended ... is spectacular. We will have three judges and a fourth guest judge in the auditions, which may be international artist or surprises."

— Julián Elfenbein on Factor X

As of January 9, 2011, the program's website registered more than four thousand join contestants. The production is already in talks with record labels, to involve the guest artists that will be performing during the final presentations, among them, would be confirmed Colombian singer Juanes.

=== Judges ===
The judges consist of four judges during auditions, but three permanent judges during the final shows. During auditions, the three permanent judges will be joined by a special guest that will be different for each city where auditions are held. On December 1, 2010, there was media speculation about the possible involvement of Italo Passalacqua, a music, film and television critic and commentator for the Viña del Mar International Song Festival. However the negotiations did not reach a positive outcome and he was dropped. Another nogeciation was revealed in December 2010, was the participation of Jordi Castell in the judges panel, but it was denied. There were negotiations with Francisca García-Huidobro for joining as a judge but her contractual engagements with Chilevisión came in the way. The producers explained that the names of the three judges will be finalized on week of January 3, 2011.

On January 9, 2011, Zeta Bosio, a former member of the band Soda Stereo and presently a DJ and music producer of emerging bands was confirmed as the first of the three judges for the first season. During the negotiation with the musician, Bosio was reportedly enthusiastic about the project. Puerto Rican singer and actress Nydia Caro will participate as guest judge at the auditions in Concepción. Later on, producers announced that the TV presenter Karen Doggenweiler and Chilean-Swedish tenor Tito Beltrán would join as permanent judges for the series.

=== Judges' categories and their finalists ===
In each season, each judge is allocated a category to mentor and chooses three acts to progress to the live shows. This table shows, for each season, which category each judge was allocated and which acts he or she put through to the live shows.

Key:

– Winning judge/category. Winners are in bold, eliminated contestants in small font.

Season	Tito Beltrán	Zeta Bosio	Karen Doggenweiler	N/A
**One**	**Over 25s** **Sergio Jarlaz**; Madriela Marchant; Héctor Núñez; María Paz Duarte	**Under 25s** Stanley Weissohn; Paolo Ramirez; Tania Giordano; Jenifer Lopez	**Groups**; MB & J Dulce Tabu; Agnus; Aduana	N/A
Season	Tito Beltrán	Karen Doggenweiler	Mon Laferte	José Luis "El Puma" Rodríguez
**Two**	**Over 25s** Francisca Barrera; Loreto Canales; Timothy Jones	**Girls**; Grey Cerro; Valentina Marinkovic; Pelussa Eder	**Groups**; Dos segundos Pacto Latino; Divas	**Boys**; **Juan Gabriel Valenzuela**; Daniel Parraguez; Alejandro Zapata; Nicolás Durán

=== Auditions ===
In January 2011 starts the process of massive auditions in search of contestants for the first season, this process will fulfilled by doing castings across the country including Santiago and regions, starting with Concepción which is known as "The Chilean capital of rock" and home to many artists and La Serena, a city that summer brings large crowds of people. The casting process began formally with the release of the application form the official website of the program, released on December 10, 2010, were announced here the four categories of participantes, soloists, duos, trios and vocal groups and the age limit to join the program is 14 of age, in addition to the groups can not be more than six.

The first stage of auditions is the presentation in front the producers, these auditions decide who will sing in front of the judges, this will be held in the Mall Plaza shopping malls in three cities and will begin at 10:30. and will run each day until 21:30. In the three cities where auditions will be held, will attend the three stable members of the jury, plus a guest national or international judge. In Concepción, after the presentation for the show's production team in the Mall Plaza chain, will move to the stage before the judges to be held at Marina del Sol Theatre during the 13 and 14 January 2011, during those days made the first recordings of the program.

=== Bootcamp ===
The bootcamp phase is the second phase of the program to be broadcast in two chapters, these chapters will gather all people classified in the stage of hearings in Santiago to face a series of tests within the workshops and work to prepare a particular song and choreography, this is where they were also presented to the contestants the task force, composed by the choreographer, vocal coach and music producer in this part they work and divided into categories.

In these so-called "workshops", the nominees of the casting mass, which border the 150 people, will be presented to the jury again, but this time without an audience, where it will become an important selection of 24 participants to leave once they finish "Workshops" will be eight per category.

=== Judges' houses ===
Thereafter come two emissions that are called "House of the judges, "at which participants will sing in a house where they will receive each juror who already has this category, in that moment where they find What jury is going to be your advocate and will work with them as a mentor, adding that each juror is inviting another famous, i.e. a special guest to help the jury to decide and there auditioning for the last time of eight of each category are only four. Being a total of 12 selected, which will be part of the live gala.
