= German Cornejo & Gisela Galeassi =

Argentine tango dance duo

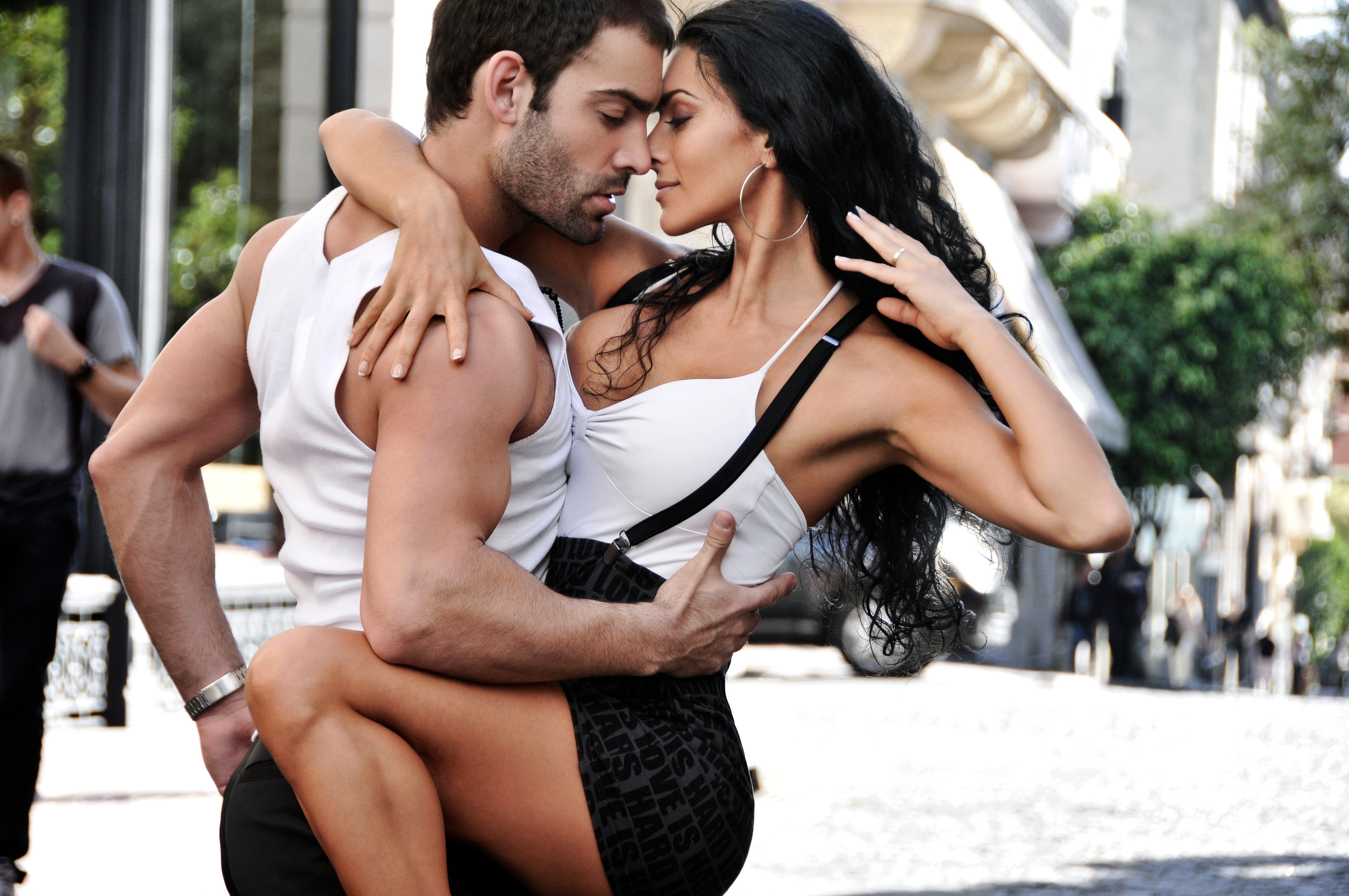
German Cornejo & Gisela Galeassi. Photo: Fuentes/Fernandez

German Cornejo & Gisela Galeassi are an Argentine tango dance duo. They have been dancing together since early 2011, currently dancing for German Cornejo's Dance Company (GCDC), performing as lead dancers for the company. , Gisela and German won the title of World Tango Champions in 2003 and 2005, respectively, at the Campeonato Mundial de Baile de Tango (in English: World tango dance tournament). Both German & Gisela have appeared in numerous TV shows, Films and have toured extensively throughout the world. They have been judges in regional tango championships in Chile, Spain, Italy, Colombia and Japan. The duo is mostly known to Anglo-speaking audiences for their appearance in the American reality television show ¡Q'Viva!: The Chosen. and recently in America's Got Talent. They were winning finalists in Jennifer Lopez & Marc Anthony's TV show Q Viva culminating in the Las Vegas stage show of the same name in May 2012, at the Mandalay Bay Arena. In June 2012 they were JLO's special guest artists at her first-ever concert in Buenos Aires.

== German Cornejo ==
=== 1986–2001: Early life ===
German Cornejo was born in Zárate, Buenos Aires Province on 31 May 1986. At the early age of 10, he started studying tango and at 15, he obtained a degree from Gatell Conservatory of Dance with the honorable title of Master of Tango.

In the following years German broadened his skills by learning classical and contemporary ballet, jazz and acrobatic techniques and studying the career of Choreographic Composition at the Instituto Universitario Nacional del Arte (National University of the Arts).

German studied under several teachers. However, the most important was Nelida Rodriguez, whom he refers to as his “Artistic Godmother”. She imparted to him not only her knowledge of dance but also the yeites (this word comes from the early 20th-century language of Tango known as Lunfardo, meaning “the secrets of the Tango steps”).

=== 1999–2013: Awards and artistic career ===
German won the “Gold New Talent” prize and the “Competition of Gold Dance” in the well known TV show Susana Giménez hosted by the popular Argentine star and broadcast by TELEFE and after seven gold medals obtained in a series of Contests for Youth in Buenos Aires Province, and more than 20 first prizes at national level, German became World Tango Champion in 2005. He has performed at many famous Tango houses in Buenos Aires including Mambo, Chiquin Buenos Aires and El Viejo Almacén. German has conducted dance demonstrations at some of the most important milongas in Buenos Aires: La Viruta, Porteño and Bailarín, Parakultural and Confitería Ideal.

German has been choreographer for the show Mission Tango under the musical direction of Lisandro Adrover and performed in Brazil in El Viejo Almacén - On Tour (with Ariel Spandrio´s Orchestra). In 2004, German performed with his dance company for the President of Vietnam in that moment, during his visit to Argentina.

In 2006 he traveled Japan extensively performing Buenos Tangos (with Fabio Hager's Sexteto) and in 2008 once more but with Tango Dance Premium (with the Fernando Marzán´s Orchestra). After years of touring extensively around the world, in 2008 German was paid homage to, in the show Evocación at the Coliseum Theatre by the Department of Culture of Zárate, his home town, for his outstanding achievements.

He performed in renowned theaters as Shanghai Oriental Arts Center (Shanghai), Petronas Philharmonic Hall (Malaysia), Badminton Theatre (Athens), The Joyce Theatre (New York), Peacock Theatre (London), The Esplanade Theatre (Singapore), Walt Disney Concert Hall (Los Angeles), Luna Park Arena (Buenos Aires), Bolshoi Theater (Moscow), GEBA Arena (Buenos Aires) and Mandalay Bay Arena (Las Vegas).

He was part of productions such as Bien de Tango (with the Orchestra El Arranque), Vamos al Tango (with the renowned Argentine pianist Osvaldo Berlingeri), Tango por La Igualdad, Tango Inferno: The Fire Within and since 2006 he has performed in Tango Fire: Flames of Desire. Currently he is Artistic Director and Choreographer of the following productions: Tango After Dark, Break The Tango, Immortal Tango and Tango Fire.".

German is regarded as one of the best teachers of Show Tango in Buenos Aires with many of his students reaching top positions in the finals in the Tango World Championship in 2006, 2007, 2008, 2009, 2010, 2011 and 2012. In 2011 German's students Max Van de Voorde & Solange Acosta won the World Championships with his other students coming 2nd, 4th & 5th place getters.

In November of the same year, German won a place in Jennifer Lopez & Marc Antony's TV reality show Q Viva broadcast on FOX TV in the US, becoming winning finalist and participating in the live stage show in Las Vegas in May 2012. In June 2012 he was invited to be JLO's special guest artist at her first concert in Buenos Aires Argentina.

In December 2012, German was choreographer and tango coach for one of the couples in the Argentine equivalent of Dancing With the Stars: Bailando 2012.

Since 2013, he has been part of the original cast of M!longa, directed by Sidi Larbi Cherkaoui.

In 2017 he participated with German Cornejo's Dance Company in the American reality show America's Got Talent hosted by Tyra Banks, where they got standing ovations and four yeses from Heidi Klum, Simon Cowell, Mel B and Howie Mandel.

In 2019, he appeared dancing with Gisela in a Durex commercial campaign of its newest product, Maraton, and in the same year he was invited to perform at the memorial of the late designer Karl Lagerfeld, organized by Chanel, Fendi and Karl Lagerfeld's brand.

He has toured the United States, Canada, Brazil, Colombia, Chile, France, Spain, Portugal, Greece, Netherland, Switzerland, China, Japan, Korea, Australia, New Zealand, Hong Kong, Thailand, Taiwan, Philippines, Turkey, Singapore, Philippines, Malaysia, England, Scotland, Norway, Serbia, Luxembourg, Russia, Austria, Germany, Portugal, Monaco, Italy, and South Africa to the highest acclaim by the international press.

=== Popular media ===
German has performed on top rating TV shows in South America: Susana Giménez, Showmatch, La Noche del 10 (hosted by Diego A. Maradona), Por el Mundo, Desayuno, Por Siempre Tango, Mp3 Musica del Tercer Milenio, Afectos Especiales, Bailando, La Hora Del Tango, Programa do Jó (Brazil), Espejo Publico (Madrid), Sky News (London), Sunday Brunch (London), Good Morning New York (New York), the reality show Q 'Viva-The Chosen (USA, Canada and Latin America), and America's Got Talent (USA).

== Gisela Galeassi ==
=== 1983–1999: Early life ===
Gisela Galeassi was born in the city of Carlos Paz, Córdoba in 1983. Since childhood was linked to art: began studying dance at school at 3 years old. At age 16, she obtained the title of Professor of Classical Dance and Spanish, and in the same year she ventures into tango dance studying with some of the best teachers from Argentina.

=== 1999–2013: Awards and artistic career ===
Gisela won several national and international awards in classical dance and tango, among which include Breakthrough Artist in 1999 in the Latin American Competition of Dance, and Tango World Champion 2003, definitely the latter, an achievement that consecrate her career.

In 2004, and because of her talent that took her to represent Argentina in the world she was declared Cultural Ambassador of the City of Buenos Aires. She worked in several of the most important shows of Argentina: El Viejo Almacen, Esquina Homero Manzi", "Cátulo and at the luxurious Faena Hotel + Universe. Gisela has conducted exhibitions in the most famous milongas in Buenos Aires: Salon Canning, La Viruta, La Estrella, El Beso and Parakultural. She has performed with major orchestras: Los Reyes del Tango, Sexteto Mayor, Color Tango, Orchestra of Buenos Aires, El Arranque and Victor Lavallén Orchestra, and she acted in renowned theaters as Colon Opera Theatre, Gran Rex, San Martin, Teatro Argentino de la Plata, GEBA Arena, Luna Park Arena, Sydney Opera House (Sydney), Chaillot Theatre (Paris) and Mandalay Bay Arena (Las Vegas) among others.

Among the films she has participated can highlight her performances in the films: Abrazos (Argentina), Buenos Aires. Mundo Lejano y Maravilloso (Japan), 12 Tangos (Germany), and as a soloist for the filming of the special DVD Rubén Juárez-Tango Live at Teatro Argentino de la Plata. Also, she starred in teaching videos like Tango Lesson (I and II) and in the film Tango Lessons with the World's Champions along with Gaspar Godoy.

Since 2003 she has been the face of successive campaigns for the dress brand Mimi Pinzon.

Gisela participated in the shows Buenos Tangos-Japan Tour with the musical direction of Fabio Hager and in One Night in Buenos Aires (Australia). She joined Tango Passion Company under the musical direction of renowned Sexteto Mayor, Tango Seduction and she was part of the cast for the remake of the legendary Tango Argentino. Since 2011 she integrates Tango Fire. She also performs regularly with Tango After Dark, Break The Tango and Immortal Tango.

In November of the same year, Gisela won a place in Jennifer Lopez & Marc Antony's TV reality show Q Viva broadcast on FOX TV in the US, becoming winning finalist and participating in the live stage show in Las Vegas in May 2012. In June 2012 she was invited to be JLO's special guest artist at her first concert in Buenos Aires Argentina.

In December 2012, Gisela was choreographer and tango coach for one of the couples in the Argentine equivalent of Dancing With the Stars: Bailando 2012.

Throughout her career she has toured Europe, Latin America, North America and Oceania, becoming one of the most renowned dancers in Japan, visiting this country in fourteen opportunities.

=== Popular media ===
She participated several times in the TV programs most important and highest-rated in Argentina as Susana Giménez, Almorzando con Mirtha Legrand, Showmatch, La Noche del 10, Bailando, Mañanas Informales, La Hora Del Tango, Dancing With The Stars (Australia), Sunday Brunch (London), the reality show Q 'Viva-The Chosen (USA, Canada and Latin America), and America's Got Talent (USA).

== Q' Viva!: The Chosen ==
German Cornejo & Gisela Galeassi's American debut together came in 2012 when the duo performed in front of actress, singer Jennifer Lopez and director, choreographer Jamie King in the reality television show ¡Q'Viva!: The Chosen. The duo were invited to audition again in Los Angeles in order to be a part of the Q'Viva live show in Las Vegas. Finally, they becoming winning finalists and participating in the live stage show Q'Viva in Las Vegas in May 2012.
