= Sergio Járlaz =

Chilean singer (born 1985)

- Born: Sergio Járlaz; 1 May 1988 (age 37)
- Origin: Santiago de Chile, Chile
- Occupation: Singer
- Instrument: Vocals
- Years active: 2009–present
- Label: Sony Music Chile
- Website: sergiojarlaz.cl

Sergio Járlaz (born 1 May 1988 in Santiago de Chile) is a Chilean singer. On 9 May 2011, he won the first ever series of Chilean edition of The X Factor broadcast on Chile's Televisión Nacional de Chile (TVN). He competed in "Over 25s" category and was mentored by judge Tito Beltrán. Stanley Weissohn became runner-up. As a reward, he will be signed to Sony Music and release an album.

== Beginnings ==
He comes from a musical family who encouraged him to sing. After winning "Beca por Talento de Gratuidad Total", he earned a scholarship to go to an arts school where the director Patricio Prieto López gave him the name Pavarotti, encouraging him to study opera. At 14 he became main vocalist for the polyphonic choir of the Pentecostal Methodist Church of Maipú. After graduating at 18, he took part in a number of musical events in Chile and in other Latin American venues. In October 2007, he sang "Nessun Dorma" and the then mayor of Alberto Undurraga promised financial aid, and based upon that, he applied to the Faculty of Arts at the University of Chile, majoring in Classical Singing supervised by Chilean soprano Lucía Gana.

He released his own independent album Sueños in April 2009.

== Participation in Chilean Factor X ==
In 2011, he applied to take part in the Chilean Factor X. He sang the following songs

Program	Date of broadcast	Song and artist	Result
Gala 1	7 April 2011	"Mentira" of Yuridia	Safe
Gala 2	11 April 2011	"Yo te Amo" of Sandro	Safe
Gala 3	14 April 2011	"Sube a nacer conmigo hermano" of Los Jaivas	Safe
Gala 4	18 April 2011	"Dueño De Nada" of José Luis Rodríguez	Safe
Gala 5	21 April 2011	"Escandalo" of Raphael	Safe
Gala 6	25 April 2011	"Te Amaré" of Miguel Bosé	Safe
Gala 7	28 April 2011	"Bella Sin Alma" of Riccardo Cocciante	Safe
Gala 8	2 May 2011	"Carusso" of Andrea Bocelli	Safe
Gala 9	5 May 2011	"Melancolía" of Camilo Sesto "Como Todos" of Nino Bravo	Finalist
Final	10 May 2011	"Como Yo Te Amo" of Raphael "Sueño Imposible" of Don Quijote de la Mancha (with Amaya Forch) "Labios de Rubí" of Sandro	Winner

He won the competition on 9 May 2011.

== Discography ==
=== Albums ===
- 2009: Sueños
