= ¡Q'Viva! The Chosen Live =

Stage show in Las Vegas on May 26, 2012

- Company: AEG Live
- Date of premiere: May 26, 2012
- Location: Mandalay Bay, Paradise, Nevada

Creative team
- Show Creator: Jamie King
- Featuring: Marc Anthony; Jennifer Lopez
- Musical Director: David Cabrera
- Supervising Choreographer: Liz Imperio

Other information
- Related: Q'Viva! The Chosen
- Official website

¡Q'Viva! The Chosen Live was a live stage show that was held May 26, 2012 on the Las Vegas Strip in The Mandalay Bay Events Center. The live show was created by director and choreographer Jamie King, singer-songwriter Marc Anthony and entertainer Jennifer Lopez.

== Background ==
A press release issued by Simon Fuller's production company XIX Entertainment stated that the live show would be "...a spectacular live Las Vegas show that will be the greatest celebration of Latin music and performance arts that the world has ever seen."

== Performers ==
During an episode of ¡Q'Viva!: The Chosen, Jamie King stated that the number of performers auditioning needed to be reduced to 46, hinting at the number of performers and acts expected at the live show. The final performer's names were revealed during the last episode of ¡Q'Viva!: The Chosen which aired April 7, 2012 on FOX. The performers are all from Latin American such as "Grupo Capoeira Topázio" from Brazil, "Malambos" from Argentina, and "Swing Latino" from Colombia. On April 1, 2012 in their YouTube promotional video, Jennifer Lopez and Marc Anthony revealed they would also perform on ¡Q'Viva! The Chosen LIVE.

== Premiere ==
According to NPR "the end product of Q'Viva will be a Las Vegas spectacular [King] is producing in April or May, just after the series ends." The live show was held at The Mandalay Bay events center on May 26, 2012.

== Creative team ==
Liz Imperio was the supervising choreographer of the live show. Liz Imperio has previously worked with Jamie King, twice during his Madonna tours. Grammy Award winner David Cabrera was the musical director and Carla Kama was the associate director. Carla Kama has worked with Jamie King for over 18 years on many of his touring shows.

== Box office score date ==
| Venue | City | Tickets Sold / Available | Gross Revenue |
|---|---|---|---|
| Mandalay Bay Events Center | Las Vegas | 8,571 / 8,571 (100%) | $729,940 |
