= Q'Viva! The Chosen =

American reality television series

- Title card
- Genre: Reality
- Created by: Simon Fuller
- Developed by: XIX Entertainment
- Starring: Jennifer Lopez; Marc Anthony; Jamie King
- Country of origin: United States
- Original languages: English; Spanish; Portuguese
- No. of seasons: 1
- No. of episodes: 12

Production
- Executive producers: Simon Fuller; Jennifer Lopez; Marc Anthony; Jamie King
- Production locations: Los Angeles, California
- Running time: 60 minutes
- Production companies: Nuyorican Productions; Marc Anthony Productions; King Productions

Original release
- Network: Univision
- Release: January 28 – April 28, 2012

¡Q'Viva! The Chosen is an American reality television series. It premiered on January 28, 2012 in the United States in its Spanish-language version on Univision with a one-hour premiere and the first season concluded on April 28, 2012. It made its United States English language debut on FOX on March 3, 2012. ¡Q'Viva! The Chosen Live was the live stage show that was held in Las Vegas on May 26, 2012 as a culmination of the series.

== Premise ==
The series follows superstars Jennifer Lopez and Marc Anthony as they travel throughout Latin America, along with director and choreographer, Jamie King, to discover the most authentic, genuine and talented entertainers and recruit them for their Las Vegas production of "the greatest Latin show ever". The talent that the trio are auditioning includes dancers, acrobats, singers, musicians among others.

== Broadcast ==
=== North American broadcast ===
Q'Viva premiered on January 28, 2012 in the United States in its Spanish-language version on Univision and composed of 12 one-hour episodes, concluded on April 28, 2012. The television show made its United States English-language debut on FOX on March 3, 2012 and was going to be aired in six with two-hour episodes, However, it had been cut from two-hour episodes to 90-minute episodes due to the show moving to late night. Then it was cancelled by Fox on May 14, 2012 after 6 episodes.

== Reception ==
"!Q’Viva! The Chosen" the reality competition show for Univision, was watched by 2.2 million viewers on its debut according to Nielsen estimates. That represents a 37% increase over what the network has averaged the previous three Saturday nights, according to network statisticians. Critics were enthusiastic that the show lacked the dramatic back stories and public humiliations that characterize other shows in the genre. Its English-language debut was not as well received. It got the same 2.2 million viewers, but lost to ABC, NBC and CBS in the time slot. Over 30 million people over the world watched Q'Viva.

== Chosen talents / acts ==
List of artists that have appeared in Q’Viva The Chosen.

Artist(s) Name	Country	Field of Talent	Invited by	Present Status^{Fox}
Sergio Rivera	Guatemala	Fire Juggler	Marc Anthony	Invited to attend auditions in Los Angeles.
Música Maya AJ	Guatemala	Mayan Music	Marc Anthony	Invited to attend auditions in Los Angeles. Invited to stay at the Q’Viva compound after auditioning.
Jesús Briones	Mexico	Mariachi Singer	Marc Anthony	Invited to attend auditions in Los Angeles. Eliminated after auditioning.
Impacto Malambo	Argentina	Malambo	Jennifer Lopez	Invited to attend auditions in Los Angeles. Two members of the group invited to stay at the Q’Viva compound after auditioning. The remaining members eliminated after auditioning.
Remolino Malambo	Argentina	Malambo	Jennifer Lopez	Invited to attend auditions in Los Angeles. All group members were invited to stay at the Q’Viva compound after auditioning.
Swing latino	Colombia	Salsa Dancers	Marc Anthony	Invited to attend auditions in Los Angeles. Invited to stay at the Q’Viva compound after auditioning.
Pablo Peña	Chile	Guitarist	Jennifer Lopez	Invited to attend auditions in Los Angeles. Invited to stay at the Q’Viva compound after auditioning.
Christian Nieves	Puerto Rico	Cuatro Guitarist	Marc Anthony	Invited to attend auditions in Los Angeles. Invited to stay at the Q’Viva compound after auditioning.
Angely Carucci	Venezuela	Salsa Dancer	Jennifer Lopez	Given a second chance and invited to attend auditions in Los Angeles. Invited to stay at the Q’Viva compound after auditioning.
Luís Miguel Guaidó	Venezuela	singer	Jennifer Lopez	Invited to attend auditions in Los Angeles.
Son Bata	Colombia	Colombian Street Band	Marc Anthony	All band members were invited to audition in Los Angeles. Lead singer was invited to stay at the Q’Viva compound after auditioning. The rest of the band was eliminated after auditioning.
Capoeira Topazio	Brazil	Capoeira	Jennifer Lopez	Invited to attend auditions in Los Angeles. Invited to stay at the Q’Viva compound after auditioning.
Odalia Fernández	Nicaragua	Singer		Not invited to audition in Los Angeles.
Paolo Ramírez	Chile	Singer	Jennifer Lopez	Invited to attend auditions in Los; Angeles after an improv audition. Invited to stay at the Q’Viva compound after auditioning.
Guillermo & Alicia Castro	Mexico	Acrobatic Quebradita	Marc Anthony	Invited to attend auditions in Los Angeles. Invited to stay at the Q’Viva compound after auditioning.
German Cornejo & Gisela Galeassi	Argentina	Tango Dancers	Jennifer Lopez; Jamie King	Invited to attend auditions in Los Angeles.
Yarishna Nicole & Karishna Ayala	Puerto Rico	Salsa Dancers	Marc Anthony	Invited to attend auditions in Los Angeles. Eliminated after auditioning.
José Febres	Puerto Rico	Conga Percussionist	Marc Anthony	Invited to attend auditions in Los Angeles. Invited to stay at the Q’Viva compound after auditioning.
Roxana Puente	Mexico	Vocalist	Marc Anthony	Invited to attend auditions in Los Angeles. Eliminated after auditioning.
Leonardo Sandoval	Brazil	Tap dancer	Jennifer Lopez	Invited to attend auditions in Los Angeles. Invited to stay at the Q’Viva compound after auditioning.
Marco Reberts & Louise Malucelli	Argentina	Tango Dancers	Jennifer Lopez; Jamie King	Only Marco Reberts was invited to attend auditions in Los Angeles.
Jose Fernández & Martina Waldman	Argentina	Tango Dancers	Jennifer Lopez; Jamie King	Only Martina Waldman was invited to attend auditions in Los Angeles.
Meleika	Panama	Dancer	Marc Anthony	Invited to attend auditions in Los Angeles. Eliminated after auditioning.
Claudio Valdés	Chile	Singer	Jennifer Lopez	Invited to attend auditions in Los Angeles.
El Balcon De; Los Artistas	Colombia	Salsa Dancers	Marc Anthony	All group members were invited to audition in Los Angeles. Only 3 dancing couples were invited to stay at the Q’Viva compound after auditioning.
Uncredited; Performers	Peru	Scissor Dance	Jennifer Lopez	Invited to attend auditions in Los Angeles. Eliminated after auditioning.
Heverton Castro	Brazil	Singer	Jennifer Lopez	Invited to attend auditions in Los Angeles. Invited to stay at the Q’Viva compound after auditioning.
Ashanti Crisanto	Honduras	Garífuna Folclórico	Marc Anthony	All group members were invited to audition in Los Angeles. Only lead performer was invited to stay at the Q’Viva compound after auditioning.
Bárbara Muñoz & Tamara Muñoz	Chile	Singers	Jennifer Lopez	Only Bárbara Muñoz was invited to attend auditions in Los Angeles. Invited to stay at the Q’Viva compound after auditioning.
Éktor Rivera	Puerto Rico	Singer	Jennifer Lopez	Invited to attend auditions in Los Angeles. Invited to stay at the Q’Viva compound after auditioning.
Nahuel Arrieta	Argentina	Murga	Jamie King	Six group members were invited to audition in Los Angeles. Eliminated after auditioning.
Victor & Gaby	Mexico	Dancers	Marc Anthony	Not invited to audition in Los Angeles.
Raul Peralta & Gabriel Peralta (Power Paralta)	Chile	Latin hip hop Dancers	Jennifer Lopez	Invited to attend auditions in Los Angeles. Invited to stay at the Q’Viva compound after auditioning.
Martin Alvear	Ecuador	Freestyle Soccer	Jennifer Lopez	Not invited to audition in Los Angeles.
Tina Aldaña	United States	Singer	Marc Anthony	Invited to attend auditions in Los Angeles. Invited to stay at the Q’Viva compound after auditioning.
Junior & Emily	United States	Dancers	Marc Anthony	Invited to attend auditions in Los Angeles. Eliminated after auditioning.
Lucciano Pizzichini	Argentina	Singer Guitarist	Jennifer Lopez	Invited to attend auditions in Los Angeles.
Diego Monge	Mexico	Fire Juggler	Marc Anthony	Invited to attend auditions in Los Angeles.
Tatita	Uruguay	Candombe; Percussionist	Jennifer Lopez	Some group members were invited to audition in Los Angeles. Eliminated after auditioning.
Little Flex Crew	Mexico	Dancers	Marc Anthony	Invited to attend auditions in Los Angeles.
Luciana Suarez	Brazil	Samba Dancer	Jennifer Lopez	Invited to attend auditions in Los Angeles. Eliminated after auditioning.
Impacto Crew	Mexico	Street Performers	Marc Anthony	Invited to attend auditions in Los Angeles. Eliminated after auditioning.
Nicolás Arnicho	Uruguay	Percussionist	Jennifer Lopez	Invited to attend auditions in Los Angeles. Invited to stay at the Q’Viva compound after auditioning.
Diana Teran	Mexico	Singer	Unknown	Invited to attend auditions in Los Angeles. Eliminated after auditioning.
Da Boom	Chile	Percussionist Group	Jennifer Lopez	Invited to attend auditions in Los Angeles.

== ¡Q'Viva! The Chosen Live ==
¡Q'Viva! The Chosen Live was a live stage show that was held May 26, 2012 on the Las Vegas Strip in The Mandalay Bay Events Center at Mandalay Bay Resort and Casino in Las Vegas, Nevada.

== Lawsuit ==
In 2013, John Jacobs filed a $25 million lawsuit against both Lopez and Anthony, claiming that the two had stolen his idea for a reality show after he had pitched it to both of their production companies in 2007.
