= Paolo Ramírez =

Chilean singer (born 1992)

Paolo Ramirez
- Born: Paolo Alberto Ramirez González; October 6, 1992 (age 32); Quilpué, Chile
- Occupation: Singer/ Vocalist
- Website: www.paoloramirez.cl

Paolo Ramírez (born Paolo Alberto Ramírez González on October 6, 1992) is a Chilean singer/vocalist from the city of Quilpué, Marga Marga Province of Chile. He won the Chilean competition Rojo II 2007 of the series Rojo Fama Contrafama and in 2011, he came fifth in Chilean Factor X.

== Biography ==
=== Rojo fama contrafama ===
Paolo Ramírez born in 1992 in Quilpué first entered the public eye at the age of 14 when he participated in the Chilean television show Rojo fama contrafama, English: ("Red: Fame Against Fame"). It was in the series Rojo II 2007 where he was mentored by Argentinean Rock musician Zeta Bosio, former member of Soda Stereo.

Ramírez won first place in the Singers category on the same day of his 15th birthday.

=== X Factor (Chile) ===
At 18, Ramírez entered yet another competition, this time in the bigger Televisión Nacional de Chile (TVN) production Factor X in its first season launched in March 2011, where he was a finalist in the "Under 25" (14–24 years) category.

His various interpretations during the competition were:

- 7 April 2011 (Gala 1 -- Personal choice): "Superstition" from Stevie Wonder (safe)
- 11 April 2011 (Gala 2 -- Top 20 songs): "Rock with You" from Michael Jackson (safe)
- 14 April 2011 (Gala 3 -- Dance music): "Paradise City" from Guns N' Roses (safe)
- 18 April 2011 (Gala 4 -- Greatest hits of all time): "Aquí estoy yo" from Luis Fonsi (safe)
- 21 April 2011 (Gala 5 -- Free choice): "Kiss" from Prince and The Revolution (safe)
- 25 April 2011 (Gala 6 -- Songs from the 1980s): "Persiana americana" by Soda Stereo (Bottom 2, saved)
- 28 April 2011 (Gala 7 -- Songs from Viña del Mar International Song Festival): "Every Little Thing She Does Is Magic" by The Police (safe)
- 2 May 2011 (Gala 8 -- Ballads): "Play That Funky Music" by Robert Parissi (Eliminated by public vote)

He finished 5th overall in the competition.

=== American Television: Q'Viva! The Chosen ===
To American audiences, Ramirez is best known for having performed an improv audition just outside Jennifer Lopez's vehicle in the 2012 reality television series Q'Viva! The Chosen, during her visit to Santiago, Chile in search of local talent for that show.

He performed for Jennifer Lopez, Marc Anthony and Jamie King in order to win a permanent place at the Q'Viva live show in Las Vegas. At the time he sang "Te Recuerdo Amanda", composed and popularized by Víctor Jara.

In the Los Angeles audition, he sang "Volver a Amar", a song by Cristian Castro.
