= Julián Elfenbein =

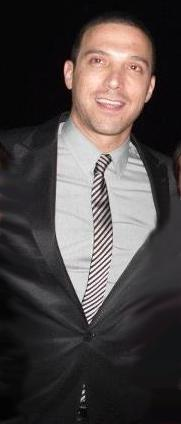

Background information
- Born: Julián Eduardo Elfenbein Kaufmann; July 24, 1972 (age 53)
- Origin: Santiago, Chile
- Occupations: Television presenter, Radio presenter, Journalist
- Years active: 2000–present
- Notable shows: Pase lo que Pase, Noche de Juegos, Primer Plano, Allá tú, Fiebre de baile, Talento Chileno; Factor X Chile

Julián Eduardo Elfenbein Kaufmann (born in Santiago, Chile on July 24, 1972) is a Chilean journalist, radio broadcaster and television presenter.

== Career ==
Julián Elfenbein studied journalism at the Universidad Diego Portales and upon graduation, had a long career in television programs most notably at Televisión Nacional de Chile (TVN), most notably with the entertainment program Pase lo que Pase, as comedian in Ponce Candidato and in Noche de Juegos.

In 2008, he became a co-presenter with Karen Doggenweiler on the reality show Tocando las estrellas (meaning No matter what happens) on Chile's Channel 13. After a break from TV for medical treatment, he returned to sign a deal with Chilevisión (CHV), with successful programs like Primer Plano, Allá tú, Fiebre de baile (Dance Fever), El Poder del 10 and Talento Chileno (Chilean Talent). In 2010, Televisión Nacional de Chile (TVN) announced that he would return to the network as host of the first-ever series of Chilean version Factor X of the international The X Factor, and host of Un minuto para ganar, the local version of Minute to Win It.

Television programs

| Year | Program | Role | Channel |
|---|---|---|---|
| 1999 | Extra jóvenes | Reporter | Chilevisión |
| 2003 | Pase lo que pase | Host | Televisión Nacional de Chile (TVN) |
| 2003 | Noche de Juegos | Comedian | Televisión Nacional de Chile (TVN) |
| 2003 | La gran sorpresa | Co-presenter | Televisión Nacional de Chile (TVN) |
| 2003 | Tocando las estrellas | Host | Televisión Nacional de Chile (TVN) |
| 2006 | Acoso textual | Host | Canal 13 |
| 2006–2008 | Primer plano | Host | Chilevisión |
| 2007 | Allá tú | Host | Chilevisión |
| 2007–2010 | Gente como tú | Host | Chilevisión |
| 2008 | El diario de Eva | Host | Chilevisión |
| 2008 | El poder del 10 | Host | Chilevisión |
| 2009–2010 | Fiebre de baile | Host | Chilevisión |
| 2010 | Talento Chileno | Host | Chilevisión |
| 2011 | Factor X | Host | Televisión Nacional de Chile (TVN) |
| 2011 | Dime por qué? | Host | Televisión Nacional de Chile (TVN) |
| 2011 | Un minuto para ganar | Host | Televisión Nacional de Chile (TVN) |
| 2011 | Buenos Días a Todos | Host | Televisión Nacional de Chile (TVN) |

== Personal life ==
Julián Elfenbein is a personality of Jewish descent. In mid-1996, Elfenbein suffered a car accident that killed his girlfriend Soledad Araiza. He lost his father in February 2010. In August 2010, a casual fall during filming of Acoso Textual, he had another serious health issue when he was diagnosed with a brain tumor that required urgent surgery. He has recovered with a return to television amid an outburst of great public support.

Elfenbein was married to Daniela Kirberg and is father of three children, Benjamin, Sarah and Rafaela.

== Awards ==
- In 2010, Julián Elfenbein won the "best TV presenter" award at the Premios Fotech 2010, with the program he presents Talento Chileno winning "Programme of the Year" at the same event.
