= Desde Que Te Vi =

Studio album by Natalino
- Released: August 2008
- Recorded: 2007
- Genre: pop rock
- Label: Audionativa Records
- Producers: H&D Producciones

Desde Que Te Vi is the debut album by Chilean pop rock band Natalino, released in August 2008.

== Track listing ==
1. Ángel Del Pasado
2. ¿Y Qué Será?
3. Y Es Por Eso
4. Desde Que Te Vi
5. Si Hablo De Ti, Hablo De Mí
6. Cuando Me Hablan
7. Desahogo
8. En Aquella Tarde
9. Me Volveré A Caer
10. Maldición
