= Natalino (Chilean band) =

Chilean band

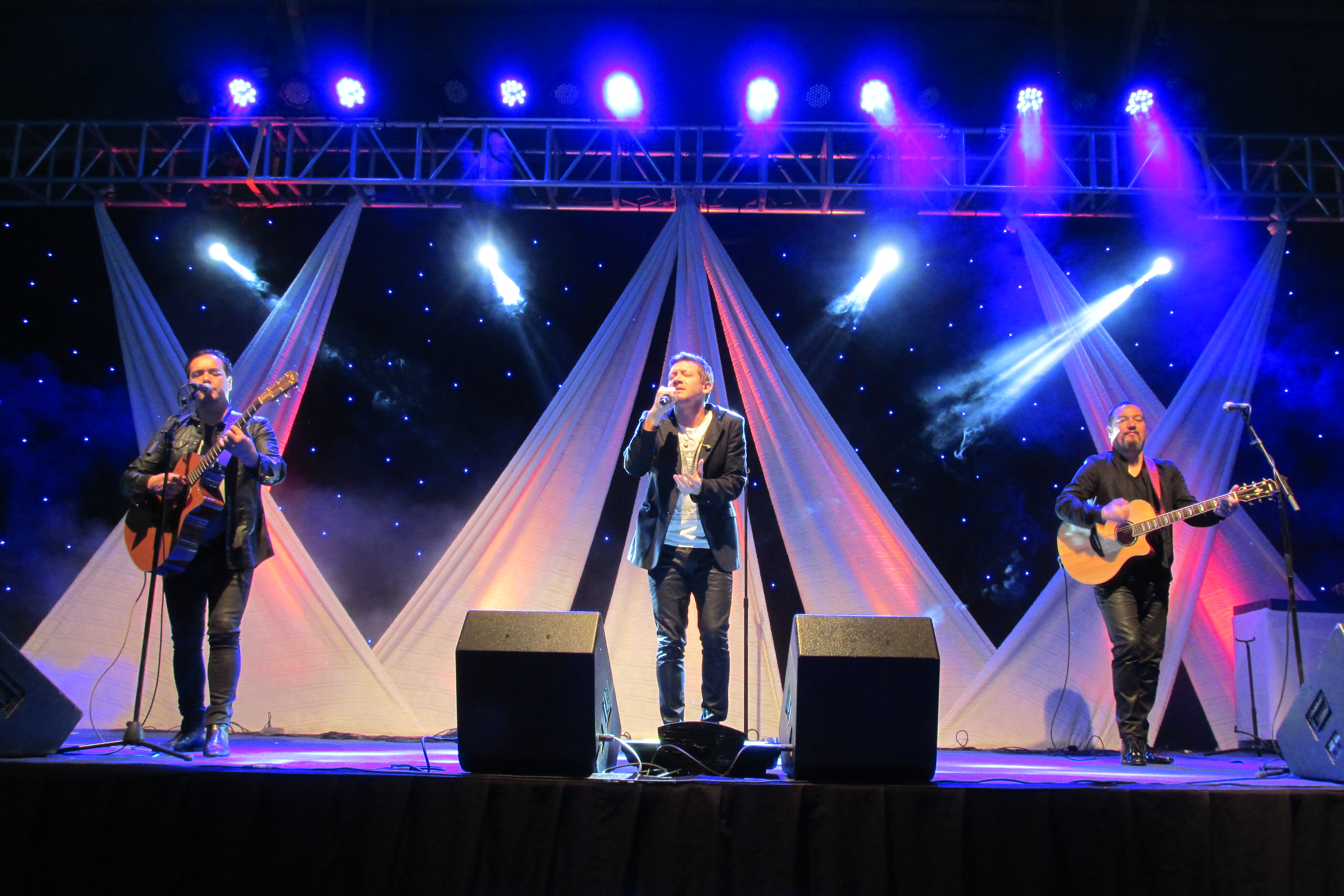
- Natalino in 2015

Background information
- Origin: Chile
- Genres: Acoustic music • Pop rock • Ballad
- Years active: 1996–present
- Labels: Audionativa Records
- Members: Cristián Natalino; Hugo Manzi; Eduardo Manzi
- Website: natalino.cl

Natalino is a Chilean pop rock band formed in 1996, under the name of "La Pé". They started enjoying mainstream success until the release of the band's first major studio album "Desde Que Te Vi" in 2007, which gone gold status in 2008, and then platinum in 2009, selling over 15,000 copies in their country. Since the beginning of the group it has been formed by Cristián Natalino, Eduardo Manzi, and Hugo Manzi as members, creating and projecting a solid musical career in various markets. Although the initially started as "La Pé", Natalino became famous in 2008 for their debut "Desde Que Te Vi", which swept the national radio and placed it in the first four places top selling discs in Chile. They were performing at Festival de Viña del Mar 2009, in which they received Silver Torch and Golden Torch. They also performed in stage the same day as Marc Anthony. Their style has been compared with bands such as Maná and Sin Bandera.

== History ==
=== "La Pé", Early years (1996-2006) ===
The band originally formed by the name of "La Pé" in 1996, with all of it current members. La Pé recorded 3 albums, the last one signed to Warner Music, and from which their cover of De Amor Ya No Se Muere (originally by Gianni Bella) had some airplay success.

=== Desde Que Te Vi and mainstream success (2007-present) ===
In 2006, the band signed to Audionativa Records, and began recording Desde Que Te Vi, the album was released in 2008, and is one of the best-selling albums of the year in Chile. The album gone gold in 2008, platinum in 2009, and spawned 3 hit singles: "Desde Que Te Vi", "Angel del Pasado", "Si Hablo de Tí, Hablo de Mi". They were also getting airplay success with "Desde Que Te Vi" in Spain, Ecuador and Uruguay, in those countries they were often compared with the Mexican rock band Maná. The international success of Desde Que Te Vi was due to the inclusion of this song in the soundtrack of Chilean soap opera Machos, which didn't enjoyed much worldwide success, but the song was recognized immediately.

== Discography ==
=== Albums ===
- Desde Que Te Vi (2008), PLATINUM Chile + 15000

=== Singles ===
Year	Song	Album
2001	"De Amor Ya No Se Muere"	Single-only release
2008	"Desde Que Te Vi"	Desde Que Te Vi
2008	"Ángel Del Pasado"	Desde Que Te Vi
2009	"Si Hablo De Ti, Hablo De Mí"	Desde Que Te Vi
2009	"¿Y Qué Será?"	Desde Que Te Vi
2010	"Cuando Estás"	Nena
2011	"Ventanillas"	Nena
2011	"Por Ti"	Nena
2013	"Ángel Del Pasado (Mexico version)"	Por Ti
2014	"Ya No Quiero Estar Sin Ti"	Por Ti
2023	"Si Dices Que Te Vas"	Natalianissimo
2024	"Felicidad"	Natalianissimo
