= Nydia Caro =

American singer

- Born: New York City, U.S.
- Genres: Pop; new-age; latin pop
- Occupations: Singer; actress
- Instrument: Vocals
- Years active: 1967–present
- Label: Alhambra

Nydia Caro is an American singer and actress.

== Early years ==
Caro was born in New York City to parents from Rincón, Puerto Rico, and initiated her career in the arts at a very young age while living in New York. She attended James Monroe High School. where she graduated in 1964. After completing high school, she enrolled in the New York High School of Performing Arts in singing, dancing, and acting classes.

== Music and acting career ==
Caro made her debut in show business acting at an NBC television show, and in 1964, released a Christmas-themed single on the Roulette Records label, "Ask Me What I Want for Christmas". In 1967, shortly after her father died, she moved to Puerto Rico and released her first album titled Dimelo tu. She has released 20 internationally acclaimed albums and CDs ever since. Caro enrolled at the University of Puerto Rico in literature to enhance her Spanish skills. She was hired immediately to co-host a popular teen show by channel 2 ("Show Coca-Cola").

The decade of the 1970s was very successful for Caro. In 1970, she won the Festival de la Canción in Ibagué, Colombia, with the songs "Hermano tengo frío", composed by Karmen Mercado, the niece of actor and astrologer Walter Mercado, and "Pongo el Mundo en las Manos de un Niño" composed by Raoul Gonzalez.

In 1972, she went to Tokyo, Japan, where she sang "La Borinqueña" before the world heavyweight boxing championship fight between George Foreman and José Roman. Ring En Español remarked that her singing of the Puerto Rican national anthem probably lasted longer than the fight itself. That same year, she made an appearance on Sesame Street with fellow Puerto Rican entertainers Raúl Juliá and Sonia Manzano.

In 1973, she participated in the Benidorm Song Festival in Benidorm, Spain, with the song "Vete ya", composed by Julio Iglesias for her.

In 1974, she won the third edition of the OTI Festival representing Puerto Rico in the OTI Festival with a song named "Hoy Canto Por Cantar". The song, composed by Caro and Riccardo Cerratto, caused some controversy in Puerto Rico for being the "anti-protest" song in that decade. Despite that, the song helped Caro further extend her popularity built on prior hit songs such as "Cuéntale", "Duerme", "Charly", "Copos de nieve" and "No Pudo Ser".

She released her self titled album in 1978 to critical acclaim, with Cash Box writing "she stands out in every song. Arrangements by E. Leiva and R. Arusa are superb. The best cuts are "Un Pueblo Es", "A Quien Vas Enganar", "Precisamente Tu", "Oye Guitara Mia"and "Sugar Me". Should go high on the Latin American charts" which it subsequently did.

She also hosted her own television program, El Show de Nydia Caro, on Puerto Rican television. Moreover, her reputation was helped by strong concert performances in prestigious venues; such as, Club Caribe and Club Tropicoro in San Juan, Carnegie Hall, the Lincoln Center in New York and many others around the world in countries throughout South America, Spain, Australia, Mexico, and Japan. Besides Puerto Rico, Caro's relevance as a cultural icon is strongest in Chile, a country in which she has performed regularly since her 1974 appearance at the Viña del Mar International Song Festival. She has appeared in Chilean telenovelas and has spent regular seasons living in the country.

In 1998, Caro released her album De amores luminosos to critical acclaim. The album was produced by the Chilean producer Joakin Bello. It features musical themes such as the song "Buscando Mis Amores", from the poems of Saint Teresa of Jesus, Luis de León and John of the Cross. It blends musical instruments native to distant countries; such as, Tibet and India, together with instruments from Puerto Rico and South America. The effort sets her apart from other artists in Puerto Rico, as the first exponent of "alternative" or "new age" music, and was named as one of the 20 best recordings in 1999 by the National Foundation for Popular Culture in Puerto Rico.

== Image ==
Caro has a reputation for her lasting beauty, her complexion has very few expression lines and gives the public the impression of her not aging with time (Caro became a grandmother in 2004). She claims she has had no plastic surgery and affirms her lasting youthful appearance is a result of minimizing exposure to sun as much as possible. At one time, she was the spokesperson for Oil of Olay products in Puerto Rico.

Caro also has a reputation for being "classy", or elegantly sophisticated. She parodied this image by appearing in an advertisement campaign run by the Banco Popular, where she reportedly sells her house to Puerto Rican rapper Tego Calderón, the contrast in their public images played upon for comic effect. Another Puerto Rican rapper, Residente from Calle 13, remarks about Caro's lasting sex appeal on the band's song "La Era de la Copiaera" ("The Age of -Copycat- Copying").

== Film ==
As an actress, Caro appeared in 1970's Un amante anda suelto. In 2000, she made her Hollywood debut, playing Isabelle in Under Suspicion, starring Gene Hackman and Morgan Freeman.

== Personal life ==
Caro married Spanish producer Gabriel Suau and they had two children, Christian (currently a film director) and Gabriela. The couple divorced after a few years of marriage, but remain on good terms. During her marriage, she continued her professional singing career, releasing over 20 albums to date.

In 2019, Caro officiated the wedding of two homosexual close friends of hers and said it was one of the most meaningful things she's ever done.

== Discography ==
- Dímelo tú (1967)
- Los Durísimos y yo (1969)
- Hermano, tengo frío (1970)
- Grandes Éxitos - Volumen Uno (1973)
- "Cuéntale" (1973) RIAA: Gold (Latin)
- Grandes Éxitos - Volumen Dos (1974)
- "Hoy canto por cantar" (1974) RIAA: (Latin) Platinum, won best song at the OTI Festival
- Contigo fui mujer (1975)
- Palabras de amor (1976)
- El amor entre tú y yo (1977) RIAA: (Latin) Gold
- Oye, guitarra mía (1977) RIAA: (Latin) Gold
- Arlequín (1978)
- Suavemente/Sugar Me (1978)
- Isadora/Keep On Movin'12" (1978)
- A quién vas a seducir (1979)
- Intimidades (1982) RIAA: (Latin) Gold
- Prepárate (1983)
- Papá de domingos (1984)
- Soledad (1985)
- Hija de la Luna (1988)
- Para valientes nada más (1991)
- De amores luminosos (1998)
- Las noches de Nydia (2003)
- Bienvenidos (2003)
- Claroscuro (2012)

Collaborations

- Cantaré, cantarás/Hermanos del Tercer Mundo (1985)
- Somos el prójimo/Aristada puertorriquena (1985)
- Al compás de un sentimiento, Así canta Puerto Rico (1991)
- Ocho puertas (2003)

== See also ==
- List of Puerto Ricans
- French immigration to Puerto Rico
- History of women in Puerto Rico
