= Tito Beltrán =

Chilean musician

Ernesto Beltrán Aguilar (born 1 July 1965), better known as Tito Beltrán, is a Chilean-born Swedish tenor. In October 2008, an appellate court in Sweden sentenced Beltrán to 2.5 years in prison for rape and sexual molestation of an underage child. Beltrán was released from prison in Sweden on 25 February 2010 and served the rest of his sentence under electronic surveillance at home.

Upon completing his sentence, he returned to Chile where he has made some public performances, also taking part in a number of public events and festivals. Late 2010, he was assigned as one of the judges for first-ever series of the Chilean X Factor.

== Musical career ==
Beltrán was born in Punta Arenas, Chile, but moved to Sweden in 1986. He studied singing with Otto Kern and Robin Stapleton at the Music Academy at University of Gothenburg, studying tenor specialized in Italian opera tradition. He has performed at various opera houses around the world, and also widely at different scenes and TV shows in Sweden. In 2007, he performed at the Royal Swedish Opera in Stockholm, where he took part in the operas La Traviata and Tosca. He has also performed popular music, among others, with Robert Wells at the annual Rhapsody in Rock with high Swedish attendance records of 43,000 people at Ullevi in an 8 August 2003 show. He was signed to Silva Screen Records.

== Legal troubles ==
In a 2004 court case, Beltrán was convicted for reckless endangerment after having driven his car with his neighbour on the hood.

In February 2008, Beltrán was sentenced to two years' imprisonment for the rape of the 18-year-old nanny of actress Maria Lundqvist while he was on tour in Sweden in 1999. The rape took place at Nötesjö Wärdshus inn immediately following a concert of the star-studded Rhapsody in Rock tour. During the trial, as Beltrán's former friend Robert Wells made his witness statement, Beltrán collapsed and had to be taken to hospital by ambulance. In October 2008, a Swedish Court of Appeal found Beltrán guilty of rape. He was also found guilty in another case, one of sexual abuse of a child and of interference in a judicial matter, where he had been acquitted by a District Court.

Beltrán has harshly criticized the trial. He is also disappointed with the level of support he has received from Chilean authorities, particularly from the Chilean ambassador to Sweden, Ovid Harasich. Beltrán accused Harasich of "lying to him" after having guaranteed "political action" to aid Beltrán in his case. After the verdict Beltrán considered of filing a case at the European Court of Human Rights. He then was arrested by police. On 12 December 2008, the Swedish Supreme Court said it would not take up the case, and thus established Court of Appeal judgement against him. Beltrán returned again to court in August 2009 for the allegation of threatening a fellow inmate. A video was released showing Tito lashing out and flipping over a table. On 31 August, Beltrán was convicted for these threats in the District Court, but no sentence was added as it was a minor offence in relation to the sentence that he had already been given for the rape. On 15 January 2010, the unlawful threat conviction was overturned in the Court of Appeals and he was declared not guilty. He returned to Chile after serving his sentence in Sweden.

== Personal life ==
In 2015, Beltrán divorced his wife Jenny Katarina (born 1979) with whom he has one son. He later married a Chilean woman with whom he had a son in 2016. Beltrán has five children from previous relationships.
