= Jamie King =

American theater director and producer (born 1972)

- Born: 1972 (age 52–53); Verona, Wisconsin, U.S.
- Occupation(s): Creative director, choreographer, writer, producer
- Agent: McDonald Selznick Associates
- Website: www.jamiekingofficial.com

Jamie King (born 1972) is an American creative director, choreographer, and producer. His work directing concert tours for pop stars has grossed over $2 billion as of 2011.

== Early career ==
King started his career in entertainment as a dancer. He appeared on the Cher video for "Love And Understanding" and went on tour with Michael Jackson on his Dangerous World Tour in 1992. Afterwards he worked as a director and choreographer in Prince's Glam Slam West nightclub in Los Angeles. While there, King created a new show every week using songs that Prince was unable to commercially release due to legal obligations to Warner Bros. Records. It was during this time that King learned staging. After seeing a performance by Prince at the American Music Awards of 1995 (that King directed and choreographed), Madonna called King to talk about the two of them working together. The first time they worked together was when he choreographed her 1995 music video "Human Nature".

== Fitness ventures ==
In 2004, King teamed up with Nike to create the Nike Rockstar Workout for use in Crunch Fitness gyms across the United States. In 2007, he released his Rock Your Body fitness DVD which sold 100,000 copies.

== Cirque du Soleil, Super Bowl, and Q'Viva ==
In 2011 King wrote and directed a touring show by Cirque du Soleil dedicated to Michael Jackson called Michael Jackson: The Immortal World Tour. In 2012, he co-created the boy band IM5 with Perez Hilton and Simon Fuller and directed Madonna's Super Bowl XLVI halftime performance. This performance marked the third time he appeared at Super Bowl for work. His first appearance was in 1993 as a dancer in Michael Jackson's performance at Super Bowl XXVII. He returned in 1996 as a choreographer for Diana Ross' performance at Super Bowl XXX.

Also in 2012, he produced the Latin-themed entertainment show Q'Viva! The Chosen with Simon Fuller, Marc Anthony, and Jennifer Lopez. The show was King's first experience working in television rather than stage; however, the singers, instrumentalists, and dancers scouted from the show did give a one-time sold-out performance at the Mandalay Bay Events Center which King also directed. King was the producer for Madonna's 2012 MDNA Tour which marked the first time since Madonna's 2001 Drowned World Tour that he had not been her tour's creative director.

In 2013, King directed another Cirque Du Soleil Michael Jackson-themed show called Michael Jackson: One. Unlike the touring show Immortal, Michael Jackson: One is a resident stage show housed at the Mandalay Bay Resort and Casino. Later in the year, King was the creative director for the third season of The X Factor.

In 2014, King directed Bruno Mars' Super Bowl XLVIII halftime performance which marked the fourth time he had appeared at Super Bowl for work.

== Tours ==
King was the director for the following tours/productions:

- 1996: Take Me Higher: A Celebration of 30 years of the Super Bowl halftime show - Diana Ross
- 1997: Soft & Gentle 'No Sweat' Tour – Louise Redknapp
- 1999-2000: Livin' la Vida Loca Tour – Ricky Martin
- 2000-2001: Oops!... I Did It Again World Tour – Britney Spears
- 2001: Drowned World Tour – Madonna
- 2003: Stripped World Tour – Christina Aguilera
- 2004: Re-Invention World Tour – Madonna
- 2006: Confessions Tour – Madonna
- 2006-2007: Rain's Coming World Tour – Rain
- 2006-2007: Back to Basics Tour – Christina Aguilera
- 2007: Ricky Martin Live: Black and White Tour – Ricky Martin
- 2007-2008: The Return of the Spice Girls – Spice Girls
- 2008: The Best Damn Tour – Avril Lavigne
- 2008-2009: Taking Chances World Tour – Celine Dion
- 2008: Hard Candy Promo Tour – Madonna
- 2008-2009: Sticky & Sweet Tour – Madonna
- 2009: The Circus Starring Britney Spears – Britney Spears
- 2010: Last Girl on Earth Tour – Rihanna
- 2011: Loud Tour – Rihanna
- 2011: Femme Fatale Tour – Britney Spears
- 2011: Michael Jackson: The Immortal World Tour – Cirque du Soleil
- 2012: ¡Q'Viva! The Chosen Live – Reality Show: Los Angeles, Las Vegas & Tour of Latin America
- 2012: Super Bowl XLVI halftime show – Madonna
- 2012: Dance Again World Tour - Jennifer Lopez
- 2012: Summer Tour 2012 - Jennifer Lopez and Enrique Iglesias
- 2013: Michael Jackson: One – Cirque du Soleil
- 2014: Super Bowl XLVIII Halftime Show – Bruno Mars
- 2014-2015: Japan Dome Tour "X" – Big Bang
- 2015-2016: Rebel Heart Tour - Madonna
- 2018: Liberation Tour - Christina Aguilera
- 2019: The Nicki Wrld Tour - Nicki Minaj
- 2019-2020: Madame X Tour - Madonna (credited as a creative producer)
- 2023: The Celebration Tour - Madonna
